= Garden Island Naval Chapel =

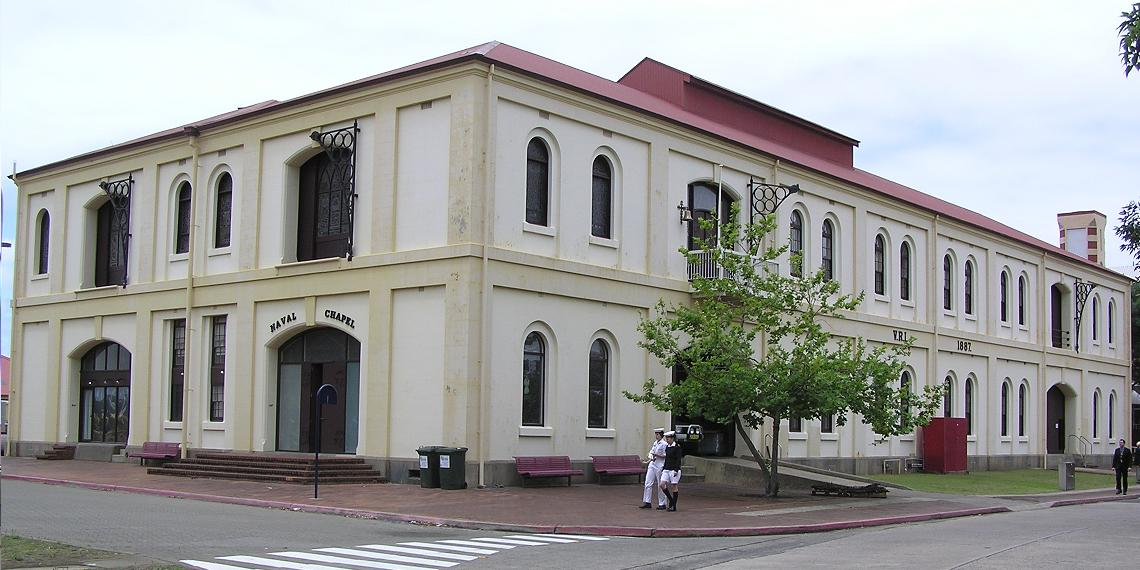
- The Naval Chapel at Garden Island

- Location in Sydney
- 33°51′44.5″S 151°13′40.8″E
- Location: Cowper Wharf Roadway, Garden Island, Sydney, New South Wales
- Country: Australia
- Denomination: Non-denominational

History
- Status: Chapel
- Founded: 1902

Architecture
- Functional status: Active
- Architect: James Barnet
- Architectural type: Chapel
- Style: Victorian Italianate
- Years built: 1886–1887 (building); 1902 (converted to a chapel)

Commonwealth Heritage List
- Official name: Rigging Shed and Chapel, Riggers La, Garden Island, NSW, Australia
- Type: Historic listed place
- Designated: 22 June 2004
- Reference no.: 105288

Register of the National Estate
- Official name: Rigging Shed and Chapel, Riggers La, Garden Island, NSW, Australia
- Type: Historic (defunct register)
- Designated: 21 October 1980
- Delisted: Defunct register
- Reference no.: 2173

New South Wales Heritage Register
- Official name: Sydney Harbour Naval Precinct
- Type: State heritage (landscape, built)
- Designated: 12 November 2004
- Reference no.: 5055190

The Garden Island Naval Chapel is a heritage-listed non-denominational Christian chapel located in the heritage-listed Garden Island Naval Precinct that comprises a naval base and dockyard in the inner eastern Sydney suburb of Garden Island, Sydney, New South Wales, Australia.

Housed in a building designed by James Barnet and built between 1886 and 1887, the chapel was established in 1902 after conversion from the former sail loft and is the oldest Christian chapel of the Royal Australian Navy (RAN) and has stained glass windows and plaques from that era to the present. The chapel was added to the Commonwealth Heritage List on 22 June 2004 and the New South Wales State Heritage Register on 12 November 2004.

The building is the oldest on Garden Island, two-storey, built of stuccoed brick with stone sills, arches and columns. The original loft floor of timber remains, caulked with oakum and bitumen.

== Setting ==
Garden Island is on the southern shore of Port Jackson, the proper name for the harbour at Sydney, Australia. It is second promontory east of the Sydney Harbour Bridge.

The Royal Navy used the island from February 1788, just a month after Australia's colonisation by the First Fleet, as a garden for provisioning first HMS Sirius and later the fleet based in the port. During the nineteenth century, the island became the support base for the fleet and various buildings were established including houses for senior staff.

The stone and brick Rigging building was built in 1887, on the shoreside shelf at the northern end of the island, in which the chapel was later established. The building bears the dedication "VRI 1887", alluding to its construction during the reign of Queen Victoria of the United Kingdom ("Victoria Regina Imperatrix"). The building now sits at the north-eastern end of the Captain Cook Dry Dock, which was constructed in the channel between the island and the mainland and connected the island to the mainland shore at Potts Point. The building has been restored, including the wrought iron swing cranes adjacent to each major upper doorway which were formerly used to get rigging to and from the upper floor. These doorways in the chapel are now stained glass windows. The main entrance is from the northern side.

== Features ==
=== Entrance ===
The entrance from street level leads to the winding wooden staircase to the main chapel (right) and Chapel of Remembrance (left).

At the entrance are three stained glass windows representing:

- the Royal Australian Navy fleet and battle honours (around the main entrance doors);
- the Women's Royal Australian Naval Service (WRANS);
- HMAS Yarra

On the wall opposite the entrance doors, midway on the stairs, is a map showing the places where RAN Honours have been won, with at each side the current and former White Ensigns of the RAN.

=== Main Chapel ===
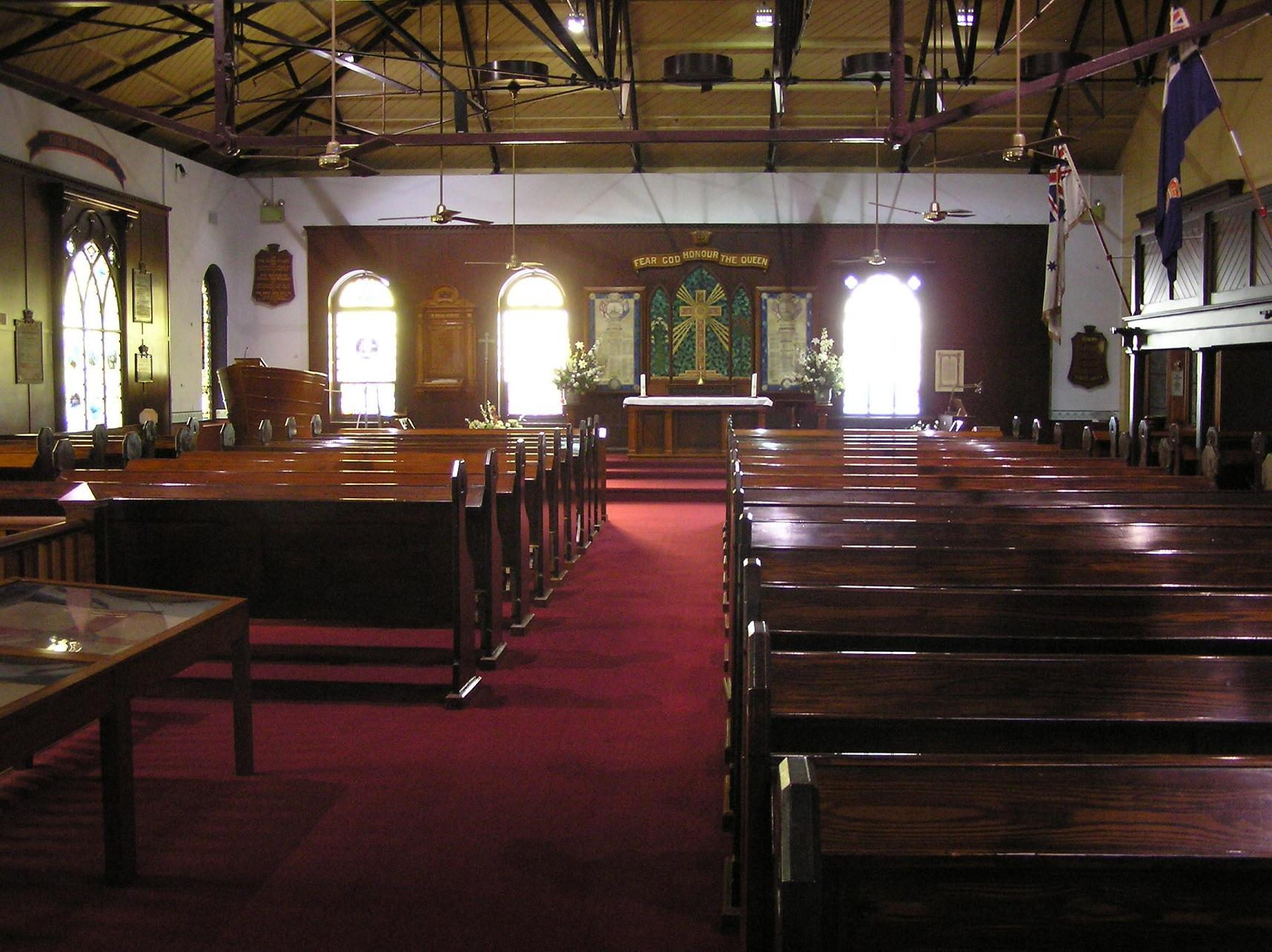
Naval Chapel at Garden Island, looking to the altar. Boat-shaped pulpit at front-left.

The main chapel is on the upper level of the building, accessed by a winding staircase from the main entrance. The layout was formerly with two equal lines of pews, until the modernisation when the Chapel of Remembrance was constructed. At that time the original stairs were removed and a staircase was erected from the new entrance. The Chapel of Remembrance could also be incorporated into the overall design of the space.

The pulpit is shaped like the bow of a boat.

==== Colours ====
The chapel houses the laid up or decommissioned fleet monarch's colours (standards) received by the RAN since its formation in 1911, from:

- George V
- Elizabeth II (two colours – pre-1967 and post-1967)

The current fleet colour is held at Fleet Headquarters, HMAS Kuttabul, whilst the location of the colour presented during the reign of King George VI is unknown.

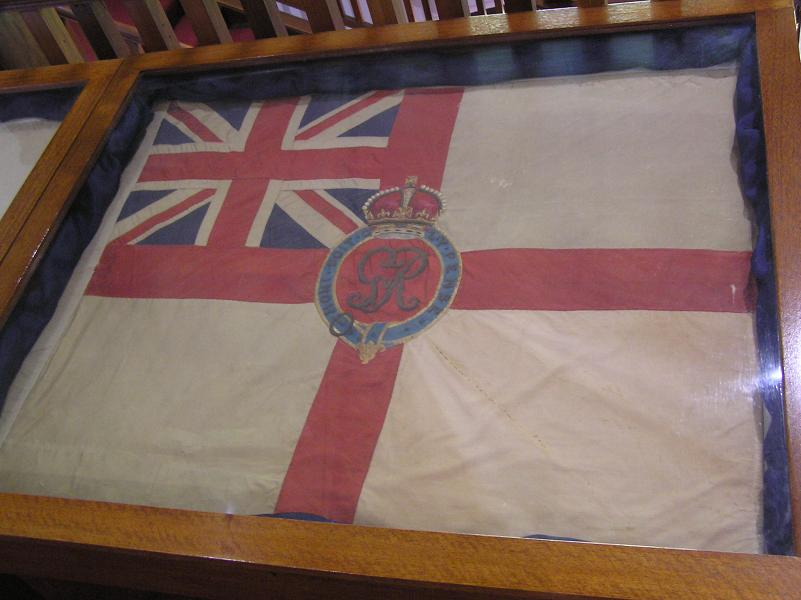
RAN Colour of George V

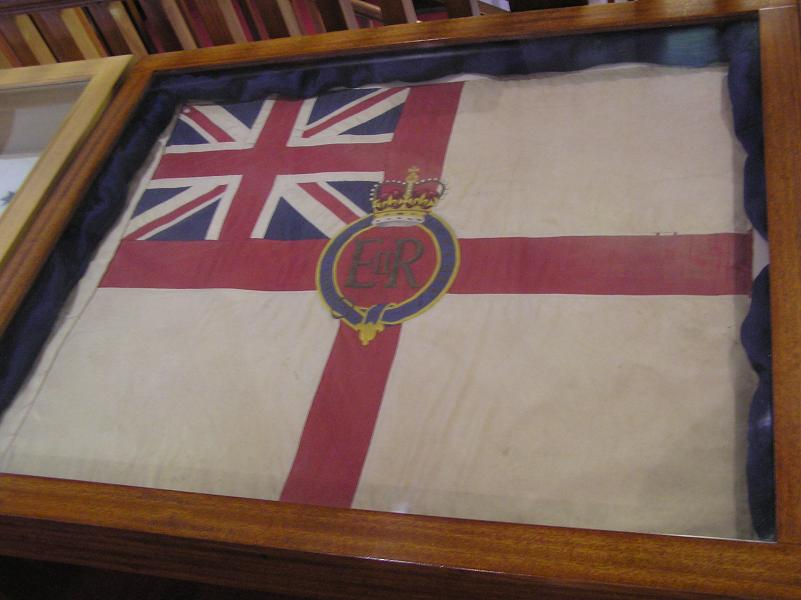
RAN Colour (first) of Elizabeth II

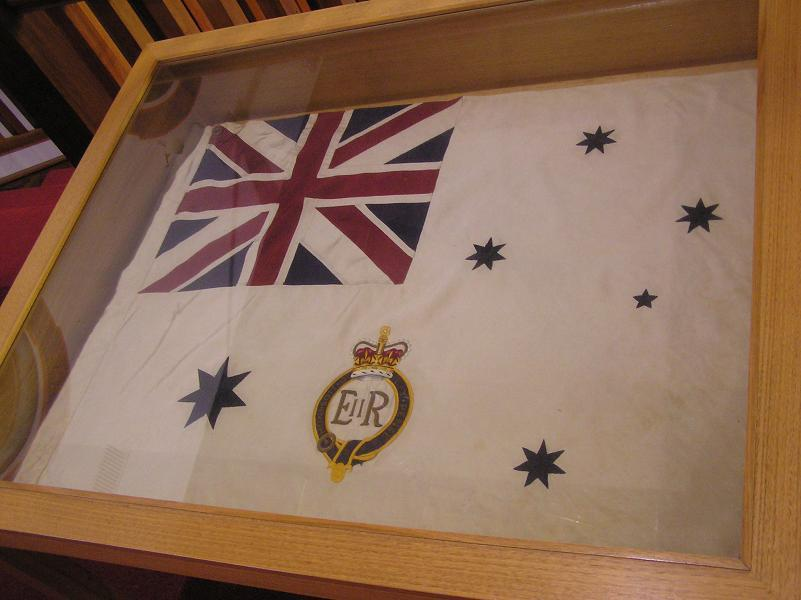
RAN Colour (second) of Elizabeth II

==== Windows ====
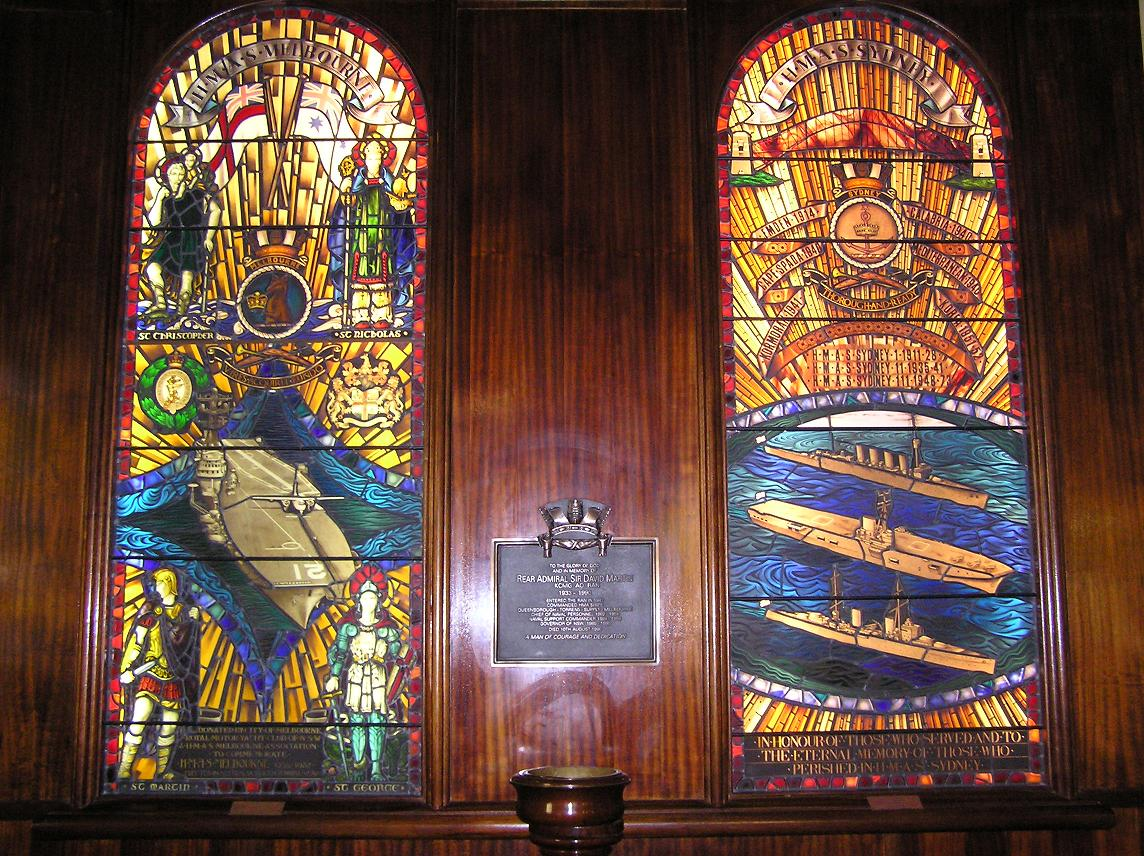
Memorial windows for the aircraft carrier HMAS Melbourne and the first three warships named HMAS Sydney. Between them is the commemorative plaque for Rear Admiral Sir David Martin KCMG AO RAN, Governor of New South Wales.

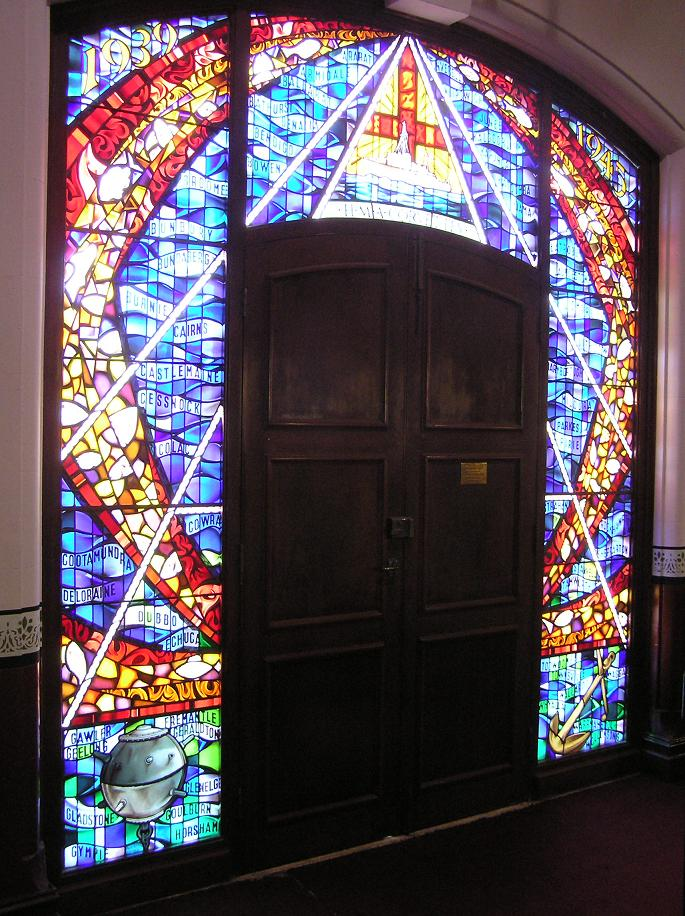
Bathurst-class corvette window; Alpha and Omega symbols; names of the ships.

The main chapel has various stained glass windows, some naturally lit and others in cases with back-lights. This list circles the chapel to the right from the altar.

Right of altar:

- Australian Submarine Flotilla (World War I): HMAS AE1 and HMAS AE2

Right wall:

- the aircraft carrier HMAS Melbourne and the first three warships named HMAS Sydney with adjacent baptismal font

Back wall & door:

- The Bathurst-class corvettes
  - The door opens to a balcony with a bell to call worshipers

Left side:

- The World War II cruisers HMAS Shropshire and HMAS Canberra
- Cruisers and small craft – Australia, Africa, and South Seas; World War I: HMAS Pioneer, HMAS Encounter, HMAS Psyche, HMAS Fantome, HMAS Protector, HMAS Una.
- Town-class cruiser: HMAS Melbourne and HMAS Brisbane
- HM Australian Destroyer Flotilla 1914–1918: HMA Ships Yarra, Parramatta, Warrego, Huon, Swan, Torrens

Behind the pulpit:

- Chaplain Vivian Ward Thompson BA, died 9 January 1943
- Australian Naval Reserve, WWI : RAN Reserve & RAN Volunteer Reserve – "Australia's first losses in the Great War were RANR personnel at Kaba Kaul, New Britain, 11 Sep 1914"

Left of altar

- HMAS Australia

==== Plaques ====
Plaques adorn the main Chapel in great number. Several poignant plaques are:

- 1987 plaque by four sons remembering their fathers:
  - Fathers:
    - Captain Emile F.V. Dechaineux, DSC, RAN (b. 1902, d. of wounds Battle of Leyte Gulf, 21 October 1944);
    - Commander Vincent E. Kennedy, OBE, RAN (b. 1901, d. 25 March 1981);
    - Commander William H. Martin, RAN (b. 1903, d. killed in action Battle of Sunda Strait 28 February 1942);
    - Commander John F. Rayment, DSC, RAN (b. 1900, d. of wounds Battle of Leyte Gulf, 21 October 1944) MID;
  - Sons:
    - Commodore P.G.V Dechaineux, AM, RAN
    - Rear Admiral P.G.V. Kennedy, AO, RAN
    - Rear Admiral D.J. Martin, AO, RAN
    - Commodore M.B. Rayment, AM, RAN
- Reverend Thomas H.D. Morgan BA
  - First chaplain to the Mission to Seamen Australia, 1895–1908
  - Chaplain (non-Naval) to the Royal Naval Station Garden Island 1900–1908
- Captain Engineer J.W.N Bull, RAN
  - d. 12 December 1956 while serving as general manager, Garden Island Dockyard
- Captain R.G. Parker, OBE, RAN (d. 6 July 1985)
  - general manager, Garden Island Dockyard 1957–1959
  - managing director, Cockatoo Island Dockyard 1962–1971
- Tablet, erected by members of the NSW Naval Forces:
  - Surgeon Lieutenant J. Steel
  - Able Seamen E. Rose, A.J. Bennet, J. Hamilton
  - Privates T.J. Rogers, C.W. Smart
    - late of the NSW Contingent, lost their lives on active service in China 1900–1901 (Boxer Rebellion)
- Captain Francis Dixson, RN
  - Founded the NSW Naval Brigade in 1863, which he commanded until 1901
  - Raised and commanded the Naval Forces which served in China 1900
- chief petty officerRodney K. Jackson (24 November 1950 – 3 August 1979)
  - Lost overboard in Bass Strait
- William J. Danahay (24 March 1902 – 24 August 1976)
  - Born on Garden Island

==== Side chapels ====
Two side chapels lead off the main chapel, at the right, one each for Protestant and Catholic worship. Both have access only from the main Chapel; the Catholic chapel is at the rear, the Protestant near the front. A door connects the two, and also gives access to a small robing room that is shared with the main chapel. Each chapel has seating for about 20 people with an altar and lectern.

=== Chapel of Remembrance ===
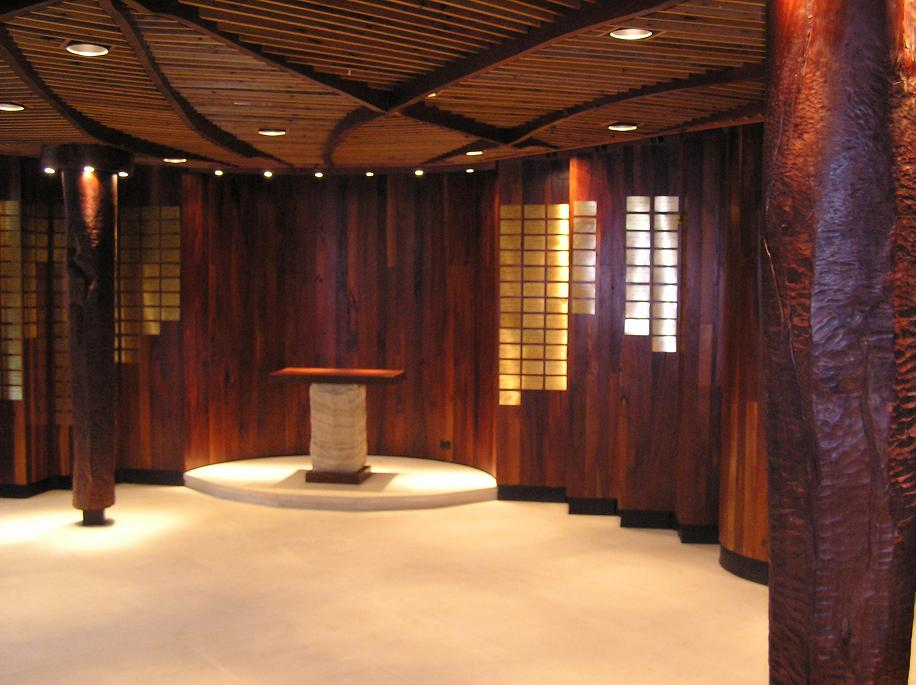
Chapel of Remembrance

The Chapel of Remembrance is accessed from the main entrance and then by several steps down, and occupies a portion of the area under the main chapel. It was officially opened on 25 August 1996 by Rear Admiral David Campbell, AM RAN, Flag Officer Naval Support Command, and dedicated by Principal Chaplains Michael Holtz AM RANR and Gareth Clayton RAN and Chaplain J.F.B. Connelly RAN.

The front wall is faceted to allow plaques to be placed on the wooden screens. Two rough-hewn posts stand in the body of the chapel. The altar is a simple wooden block of a sandstone plinth, standing on a raised area at the front wall.

==== Features ====
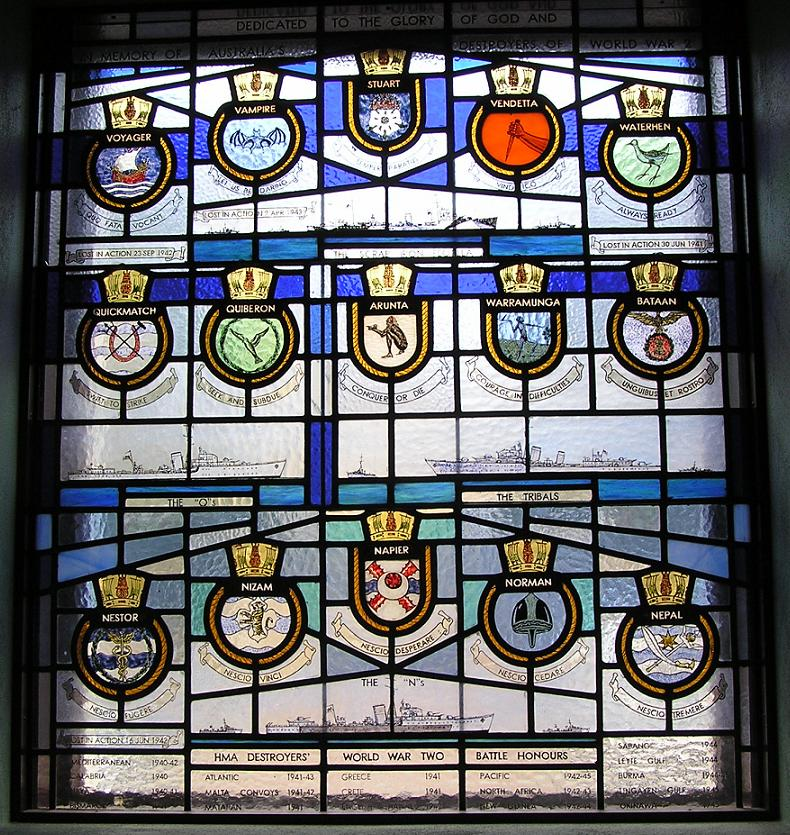
Australian Destroyers, World War II, including the Scrap Iron Flotilla.

Three windows are on the left wall:

- a modern rendition of John 15:13, "The greatest love you can have for your friends is to give your life for them."
- a stylised, back-lit rendition of the naval ensigns
- Australian Destroyers, World War II:
  - HMA Ships Voyager, Vampire, Stuart, Vendetta, HMAS Waterhen (D22) – the Scrap Iron Flotilla
  - HMA Ships Quickmatch, Quiberon, Arunta, Warramunga, Bataan – Q class and Tribal class
  - HMA Ships Nestor, Nizam, Napier, Norman, Nepal – N class
- A bas-relief in bronze of the family members of naval personnel on sandstone is by the arch door.

== See also ==
- Garden Island Naval Precinct
- List of chapels in Sydney
