= Australia in the Allied intervention in the Russian Civil War =

Intervention in Russian Civil War

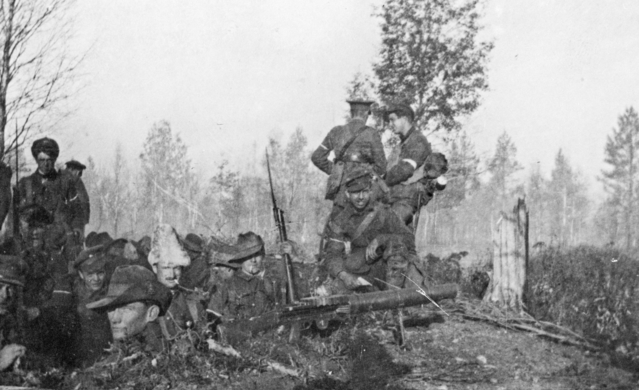
Australian Fusiliers of the 45th Battalion in Russia, 1919

The Russian Civil War (1917–1921) began after the provisional government collapsed and the Bolshevik party assumed power in October 1917. The principal fighting occurred between the Bolshevik Red Army and the forces of the White Army, a group of loosely allied anti-Bolshevik forces. During the war several foreign armies took part, mostly fighting against the Red Army—including the Western allies—and many foreign volunteers fought for both sides. Other nationalist and regional political groups also participated in the war, including the Ukrainian nationalist Green Army, the Ukrainian anarchist Insurgent Army and Black Guards, and warlords such as Ungern von Sternberg. Despite some pressure from Britain, the Australian Prime Minister, William Hughes, had refused to commit forces to Russia following the end of World War I in 1918.

Although no Australian units were engaged in operations, many individuals did become involved through service with the British Army during the North Russia Campaign. They served in many roles, including as advisors to White Russian units as part of the North Russian Expeditionary Force (NREF). About 150 men of the Australian Imperial Force who were still in England awaiting repatriation following the end of World War I enlisted as infantry in the North Russia Relief Force (NRRF), where they were involved in several sharp battles. The Royal Australian Navy was also involved, the destroyer HMAS Swan being briefly engaged in an intelligence-gathering mission in the Black Sea in late 1918 on behalf of the British military mission then advising the White Russian general, Anton Denikin. Several Australians acted as advisers to this mission as well, and others served as advisers with Admiral Aleksandr Kolchak in Siberia.

Later, another small group of Australian volunteers served on operations in Mesopotamia as part of Dunsterforce and the Malleson Mission, although these missions were mainly aimed at preventing Turkish access to the Middle East and India, and the men did little fighting.

== Background ==
In 1917, Russia had been in political turmoil with support for the war and the Tsar dwindling. Under intense pressure Tsar Nicholas II abdicated in March and a provisional government formed under Alexander Kerensky, pledging to continue fighting the Germans on the Eastern Front. The Western allies had been shipping supplies to Russia since the beginning of the war, through the ports of Archangel Arkhangelsk, Murmansk and Vladivostok. Following the entry of the United States into World War I in 1917, the Americans also began providing support. Political and social unrest increased, and the revolutionary Bolsheviks gained widespread support. During the July Offensive, the Russian Army was soundly defeated by the German and Austro-Hungarians, leading to the collapse of the Eastern Front. The Russian Army was on the verge of mutiny and most soldiers had deserted the front lines. Kerensky's government was overthrown in October 1917, and the Bolsheviks assumed power. The Russian Civil War began in the wake of the collapse of the provisional government. The principal fighting occurred between the Bolshevik Red Army and the forces of the White Army, being a group of loosely allied anti-Bolshevik forces. Foreign armies also took part, mostly fighting against the Red Army, and many foreign volunteers fought for both sides. Other nationalist and regional political groups also participated in the war, including the Ukrainian nationalist Green Army, the Ukrainian anarchist Insurgent Army and Black Guards, and warlords such as Ungern von Sternberg.

Meanwhile, on 2 December 1917 an armistice was signed between Russia and the Central Powers at Brest-Litovsk and peace talks began. The newly formed Russian Soviet Federative Socialist Republic signed the Treaty of Brest-Litovsk with the Germans on 3 March 1918, formally ending the war on the Eastern Front and permitting the redeployment of German forces to the Western Front, altering the balance of power. The treaty also permitted the occupation of large areas of European Russia, and within these territories were large stocks of military equipment previously supplied by the allies. In particular, there were large stocks of such supplies in the northern ports of Murmansk and Archangel Arkhangelsk . The Allied intervention involved fourteen nations and was conducted over a vast expanse of territory. The initial goals of the Western powers had been to rescue the Czechoslovak Legion which had been fighting the Central Powers on the Eastern Front and had later fought the Bolsheviks, as well as to secure the supplies of munitions and armaments in Russian ports to prevent their capture by German forces, and possibly also to re-establish the Eastern Front. With the end of World War I and fearful of Bolshevism, the Allies openly, if only half-heartedly, intervened in the Russian Civil War, giving support to the pro-tsarist anti-Bolshevik White forces as part of the North Russia Campaign. Opposition for the ongoing campaign became widespread, mostly due to a combination of a lack of public support and war-weariness; while divided objectives and a lack of an overarching strategy also hampered the effort. These factors, together with the evacuation of the Czechoslovak Legion and the deteriorating military situation, compelled the Allies to withdraw by 1920. With the end of allied support, the Red Army soon defeated the remaining White government forces, leading to their eventual collapse.

== North Russian Expeditionary Force (NREF), 1918–1919 ==
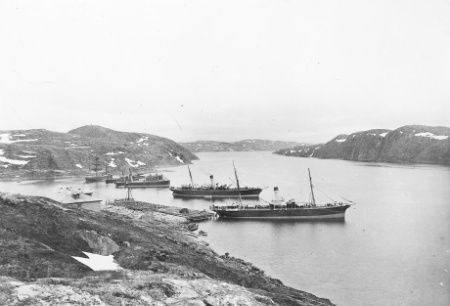
NREF arrives in Murmansk, 1918.

Following the collapse of the Russian war effort in the wake of the Revolution in 1917, the British raised and dispatched a force to Northern Russia, known as the North Russian Expeditionary Force (NREF), under the command of Major General Edmund Ironside. Its purpose was to train a White Russian force in preparation for the creation of a new Eastern Front against the Central Powers, as well as to ensure that large quantities of military supplies shipped there to equip the Russian Army under Tsar Nicholas did not fall into German hands. The NREF numbered 70 officers and 500 enlisted men, and was chosen from men who had volunteered in Britain for "a secret mission and were not told until their ship had left Newcastle where they were headed." The force was broken into two groups—Syren Force (Murmansk) and Elope Force (Archangel)—Murmansk was reached on 24 June 1918, while Elope Force subsequently sailed on to Archangel.

Included were nine Australians—three officers and six sergeants—who had been selected by AIF Headquarters in April 1918. All were experienced soldiers, three having served at Gallipoli as well as in France. Sailing on the SS City of Marseilles on 17 June 1918 the Australians arrived in Murmansk and most were immediately sent out on patrol. Later they were switched to the Archangel section. The men were then broken into small advisory groups and attached to White Russian and White Finnish units, being engaged in a range of administrative, instructional and advisory tasks. Due to their isolation, it is difficult to make generalisations about the nature of service experienced by the Australians at this time. Captain P.F. Lohan served in a variety of administrative positions both in Murmansk and Archangel, whilst Sergeant R.L. Graham was commissioned in the field and became railway transport officer on the Archangel-Vologda railway. Several other sergeants were involved in training roles, while Captain Allan Brown was attached to the North Russian Rifles based at Onega—a White Russian battalion.

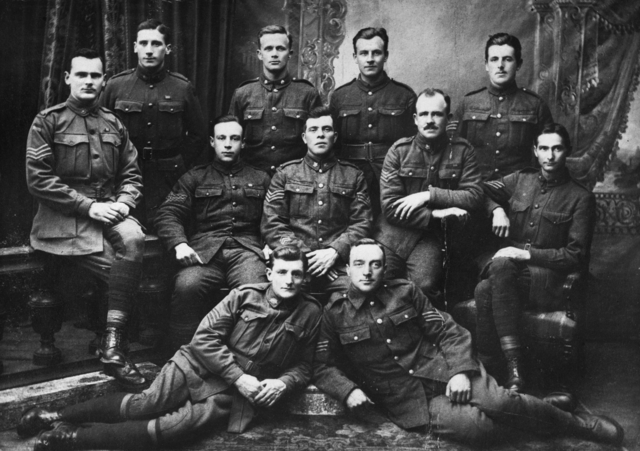
Australians of Elope Force

Not only were the advisers in danger from the enemy, but also from the men they commanded or advised. On 20 July 1919, Brown was murdered by his men when they mutinied and went over to the Bolsheviks. He was the only Australian to be killed, but there was at least one other major mutiny among the White forces during this period, and several other Australians had narrow escapes. With these incidents becoming increasingly common, and with the ineffectiveness of such a small force in influencing the outcome of the civil war, in March 1919 the decision was made to withdraw the force. As all faith had been lost in the reliability of locally raised units, this could only be safely completed with the provision of a covering force, and until this could be raised the NREF was condemned to endure the harsh Russian winter.

== North Russia Relief Force (NRRF), 1919 ==
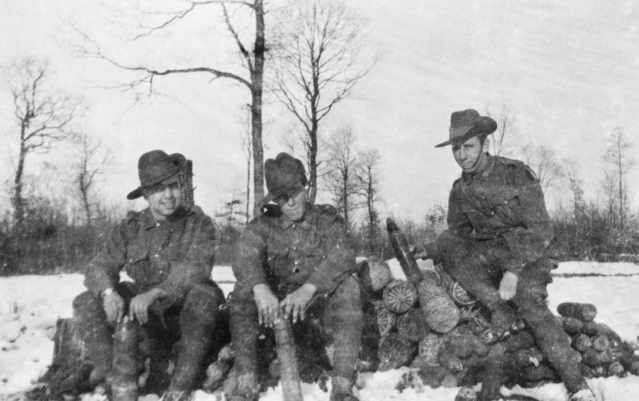
Australian soldiers from NRRF in Russia, 1919

Recruiting for the relief force began immediately in England on a voluntary basis and would ultimately include men from every regiment of the British Army, and all the dominions. The North Russian Relief Force (NRRF) subsequently formed two brigades—one under the command of Brigadier General Lionel Sadlier-Jackson, and the other under Brigadier General George Grogan, and both under the overall command of Major General Edmund Ironside. Sadlier-Jackson's brigade included over 4,000 men, including the 45th and 46th Battalions, the Royal Fusiliers, supporting machine gunners from the 201st Machine Gun Battalion, as well as artillery, signallers and engineers. Grogan's brigade was primarily drawn from battalions of the Worcestershire Regiment.

Due to the high regard held for dominion troops as a result of their exploits in France during the war they were specifically targeted for recruitment. Indeed, some 400 to 500 men of the Australian Imperial Force (AIF)—who were in England awaiting repatriation to Australia following the end of the war—initially indicated a willingness to join, but nowhere near as many actually enlisted. All Australians who volunteered were discharged from the AIF and re-enlisted in the British army as private soldiers for a period of one year. This was necessary because the dominions had already indicated that they were not interested in providing forces for the intervention. Ultimately about 150 Australians enlisted to serve in the NRRF, most of them recruited by Major Harry Harcourt. The Australians mainly served in the 45th Battalion and the 201st Machine Gun Battalion under Sadlier-Jackson, although some may also have served in the 46th Battalion. (Note: There is some conjecture on the total numbers of Australians that enlisted (figures cited include between 100 and 200), while the units they served in is also uncertain. Challinger lists the names of 136 AIF members identified as having joined the force.) Despite being enlisted in the British Army the Australians wore uniforms of the AIF and were formed into two mainly Australian companies in the 45th Battalion.

The AIF relinquished control over the men and responsibility for them while they were part of the NRRF, but undertook to repatriate them to Australia after they returned from Russia. Their motivations for joining were diverse, although few seemed have been political. Some had arrived in Britain as reinforcements too late to see any fighting during the war, and wanted to experience active service before returning to Australia. Others were decorated veterans and may have been motivated by a desire to see Russia, whilst some may have been unable to settle down after their wartime experiences, and could have viewed service as a means of postponing their return to civilian life.

=== Arrival and early deployments, June 1919 ===
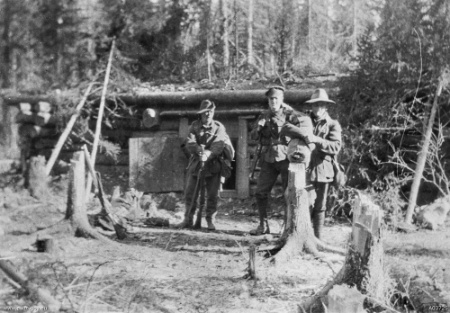
Bolshevik blockhouse, 1919

The NRRF arrived in Archangel on 5 June 1919 aboard the SS Porto and SS Stephen and almost immediately moved up the Dvina River to a camp at Osinova. There they began training for an offensive up the rail and river systems of the Dvina. This offensive was designed to push the Bolshevik forces of the Red Army back while the Allies withdrew without interference. A secondary aim was to leave the White Russian forces in a better military position, in the optimistic hope they could subsequently hold their own. Meanwhile, with the arrival of the NRRF, the survivors of the earlier NREF were subsequently evacuated. Activity during this period also included small-scale patrol and ambush operations around Troitska to the south in an attempt to keep the Bolsheviks off balance, as well as to provide the White Russian forces with the motivation to fight. Both sides had a small air arm, and the British established a makeshift airfield at Bakaritsa, near Archangel. Later in the campaign Sopwiths from France were used from a strip at Obozerskaya. The allies soon established air superiority, shooting down several Bolshevik aircraft. At least one Australian—Ira Jones—is known to have served with the Royal Air Force in North Russia.

=== August offensives of 1919 ===
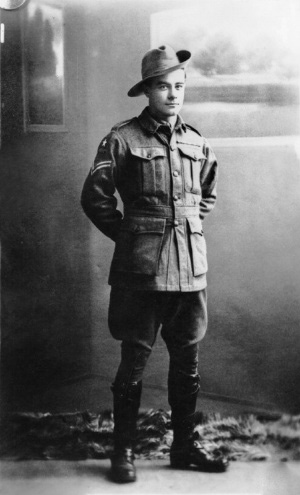
Corporal Arthur Sullivan (VC)

In early August, Major General Ironside launched his offensive against the 6th Red Army, the British force subsequently inflicting heavy casualties and taking many prisoners for relatively little loss to themselves. The offensive was mainly fought through thick pine forest and swamp which provided little terrain for manoeuvre and although hugely successful, may have been unnecessary. Indeed, the Bolshevik forces in the region perhaps numbered only 6,000 men, and was probably engaged in holding operations only. It has been suggested that they probably had no intention of interrupting the Allied evacuation, and may have been caught unprepared by the sudden offensive. The main Red Army activity in early August was on the Siberian front, where Kolchak's White armies were falling back in disarray.

During this time the Australians were prominent in several actions, taking part in at least four major actions—at Troitsa (Sergeevskaya) on 7 July, at Obozerskaya (Обозерский) between 20 and 23 July, at Seltsoe (Сельцо) on 10 August and at Emtsa (Емца) on 29 August. Meanwhile, the first significant engagement occurred on 23 July 1919 when Ironside had gone to investigate a meeting of White Russian forces at Obozerskaya. The Australian's subsequently repulsed a Bolshevik attack on a railway in the area surprising the enemy during a relief of their forward blockhouses. They attacked with their bayonets, perhaps killing 30 and wounding many more before setting fire to the blockhouses and withdrawing.

On 10 August 1919, one of the largest engagements of the intervention occurred, taking place at Seltso and the surrounding villages along the Dvina. In a confused battle through the marshy swamps Sadlier-Jackson's brigade battled a large Bolshevik force, with the Fusiliers—including the two Australian companies of the 45th Battalion—fighting their way through with their bayonets and re-occupying Seltso. Perhaps as many as 1,000 prisoners were taken and 19 field guns captured. Due to the terrain the Fusiliers had been unable to manoeuvre their mountain guns through the swamp, whilst Sadlier-Jackson had to use an observation balloon for situational awareness. During this battle an Australian, Corporal Arthur Sullivan, won the Victoria Cross (VC) for saving a group of drowning men while under fire.

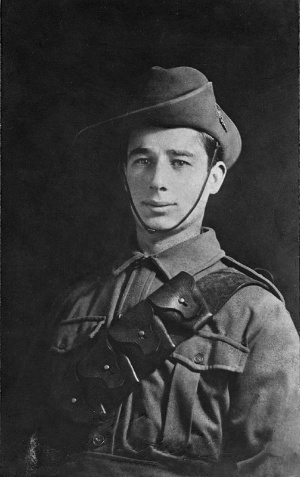
Sergeant Samuel Pearse (VC)

On 29 August 1919, the last British offensive along the railway occurred at Emtsa. The assault on Emsta was a planned attack, in which a White Russian unit was to make a frontal attack on the positions of the 155th Regiment of the Red Army. Attached were the Australians, on their right, and before the assault they moved under the cover of darkness to within 70 yards (64 m) of the Bolshevik positions. During the ensuing fighting an Australian, Sergeant Samuel Pearse, cut his way through the barbed wire entanglements under heavy enemy fire, clearing a way for others to enter. With the fire from blockhouses causing casualties among the assaulting troops, Pearse then charged the blockhouses single-handedly with his Lewis gun, killing the occupants with bombs before being killed by machine-gun fire himself soon after. For his actions he was later awarded the second Victoria Cross of the campaign. The furious engagement then ended with the surrender of the Bolshevik forces.

=== Withdrawal, September–October 1919 ===
The victories of 10 and 29 August allowed the allies the space they needed to withdraw. Following the August offensive minor patrol activity continued throughout September to provide a screen whilst forward positions were evacuated and stores either removed or destroyed. By the night of 26–27 September the Allies had subsequently withdrawn from Archangel, and Murmansk was evacuated on 12 October aboard a flotilla of troopships and escorts which sailed for Britain. This thereby ended Australian involvement in North Russia.

== Other Australian involvement in the Russian Civil War ==
As well as those who served in North Russia, Australians were involved on the periphery of the Russian Civil War. Vessels of the Royal Australian Navy briefly operated in the Black Sea in late 1918, and individuals served in Mesopotamia as part of Dunsterforce and the Malleson Mission. Some Australians also served as advisers with the British Military Mission to Admiral Aleksandr Kolchak in Siberia and others in South Russia supporting the White Russian General Anton Denikin.

=== HMAS Swan in the Black Sea, 1918–1919 ===
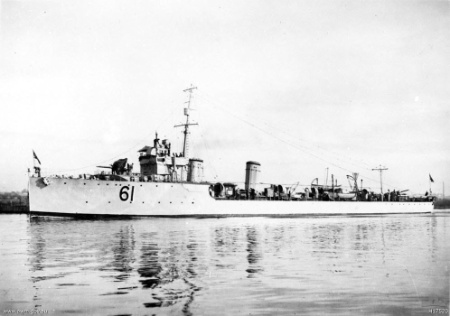
HMAS Swan, c. 1916–18

An Australian naval vessel, HMAS Swan, under the command of Commander Arthur Bond (RN), conducted a reconnaissance and intelligence gathering mission in the Black Sea and territory of the Don Cossacks in December 1918, in conjunction with the French destroyer Bisson. The mission, conducted on behalf of the British military mission then advising the White Russian forces under General Denikin, was detailed to report to the true state of the Cossack forces and was carefully circumscribed by the British Foreign Office. Indeed, although the Cossacks fêted Commander Bond as a comrade-in-arms he had to explain to them that they were purely on an information gathering mission with the Australian vessel in no way intended to render military or naval aid to the Cossacks. After inspecting anti-Bolshevik forces in the area, as well as military facilities and factories, Swan subsequently carried out anti-Bolshevik guard duties in Sevastopol, the ship's guns helping protect the railway station at the head of the Inkerman valley. These duties were completed without incident and Swan subsequently sailed for Plymouth on 3 January 1919.

Further RAN involvement included HMAS Yarra and HMAS Torrens who were both also involved in the Black Sea area, being the first two destroyers on station at Novorossiisk and Batum. HMAS Parramatta carried despatches and mail between Constantinople and Sebastopol from the time of the Turkish surrender until early January 1919. Parramatta also escorted a group of Russian warships, which were handed over to the anti-Bolshevik forces at Sebastopol in late November 1918. All these operations appear to have been free of incident.

Other Australian involvement in South Russia included several Australians acting as advisers with mission to assist General Denikin, including one of who commanded a company of the 7th Battalion, the Royal Berkshire Regiment. Ultimately the British Military Mission remained in South Russia and was only evacuated in March 1920 after Denikin's forces were routed by a Red Army offensive, and the collapse of the White cause seemed imminent.

=== Dunsterforce and the Malleson Mission in Mesopotamia, 1918–1919 ===
Dunsterforce fought in Mesopotamia in an attempt to keep the Turks and the Bolsheviks out of Persia and Transcaucasia by rearming and leading those elements of the old Russian imperial army that were still prepared to fight following its collapse. The mission was set up by Major General Lionel Dunsterville in 1918 with the purpose of organising the forces of the Transcaucasian Democratic Federative Republic comprising—Armenia, Azerbaijan and Georgia—to enable them to withstand a Turkish attack. Their task was often impeded by civil war, and in May 1918, Armenia, Azerbaijan and Georgia separately declared their independence. Dunsterforce assumed a more direct military role when Baku was threatened by Turkish attack at the Battle of Baku. In August 1918 it was reinforced by about 1,000 British infantry and occupied the town to prevent the port and nearby oil-fields from falling. Despite initial success Baku was evacuated the following month, due to the vastly superior numbers of the Turkish force. The British returned after the armistice, and remained as an occupying force until September 1919. 48 Australian officers and NCOs were attached to Dunsterforce.

Meanwhile, Australians were involved in the Malleson Mission under Major General (Sir) Wilfrid Malleson in Turkestan during 1918–1919, but they also saw little fighting. Malleson's aim was to block possible German-Turkish thrusts towards India and Afghanistan, but instead his soldiers became involved in fighting the Bolsheviks around Merv. The force withdrew by April 1919.

== Assessment ==
Although the motivations of those Australians that volunteered to serve in Russia can really only be guessed at, they seem unlikely to have been political. Possibly, as one historian has suggested, "a few had not seen enough fighting, or perhaps had seen too much". They confirmed the Australians' reputation for audacity and courage, winning the only two Victoria Crosses of the land campaign. (Note: Three other VCs were awarded to members of the Royal Navy for actions at Kronstadt, during the British campaign in the Baltic (1918–1919). See List of Victoria Cross recipients by campaign.) As the Australian government had refused flatly to supply forces for the intervention, their involvement was limited. Australia's participation was barely noticed at home. Ultimately it made no difference to the outcome of the Russian Civil War, perhaps other than to help confirm the Bolshevik's mistrust of the Western powers. Total Australian casualties included 10 killed and 40 wounded, most deaths being from disease during the Mesopotamian operations.

== See also ==
- List of states and regions involved in the Russian Civil War
- Bibliography of the Russian Revolution and Civil War
- Outline of the Russian Revolution and Civil War
