= SS Esturia (1910) =

Oil tanker

History
- Name: Esturia (1910-1928); Loukia (1928-1937)
- Builder: Armstrong Whitworth & Company, Walker
- Yard number: 826
- Launched: 23 Aug 1910
- Completed: Oct 1910
- Identification: UK Official Number: 129151
- Fate: Sank after hitting a mine in 1937

General characteristics
- Tonnage: 2,143 GRT
- Length: 275 feet (84 m)
- Beam: 39 feet (12 m)
- Draught: 28.8 feet (8.8 m)

Esturia was a 2,143 gross register ton oiler, built by Armstrong Whitworth & Company, Walker in 1910. She operated as an oil tanker for the Burmah Oil Company, before being chartered by the Royal Australian Navy on 11 September 1914, during the First World War, as an oiler and stores ship. She served as the destroyer depot ship for HMAS Swan, Huon, and Torrens in Australian and Malayan waters. After being dispatched to Port Said, Egypt with the destroyers, she was transferred to the Admiralty.

After serving with the Admiralty, she was sold in 1918 to Shell Tankers UK, who operated her until 1928 when she was sold to the Greek company Mavris Bros Piraeus and renamed Loukia.

== Fate ==
Loukia was lost on 4 March 1937, during a storm, after hitting a mine off Cape San Sebastian, Catalonia, Spain, during the Spanish Civil War. Loukia exploded, killing 23 of the 24 crew.
