= D79 =

D79 may refer to:

- D. 79, Wind Nonet in E♭ minor by Franz Schubert, Eine kleine Trauermusik (composed in 1813)
- HMAS Yarra (D79), River-class torpedo-boat destroyer of the Royal Australian Navy (RAN)
- HMCS Saguenay (D79), River-class destroyer that served in the Royal Canadian Navy (RCN) from 1931 to 1945
- HMS Cadiz (D79), Battle-class destroyer of the Royal Navy
- HMS Puncher (D79), Bogue-class escort carrier built during World War II for the United States Navy
