= SS Esturia =

SS Esturia may refer to a number of ships;

- SS Esturia (1910), a 2,143-ton oil tanker, built in 1910, renamed Loukia in 1928 and lost after hitting a mine in 1937, during the Spanish Civil War.
- SS Esturia (1914), a 6,968-ton oil tanker, built in 1914 as La Habra, renamed Apache in 1936 and Esturia in 1937.
