= River-class torpedo-boat destroyer =

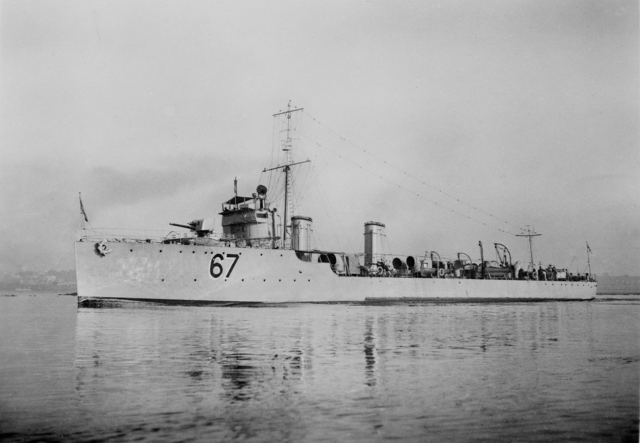
- HMAS Torrens

Class overview
- Name: River-class torpedo-boat destroyer
- Operators: Royal Australian Navy
- In commission: 1910–1930
- Completed: 6

General characteristics
- Type: Torpedo-boat destroyer
- Displacement: 750 tons
- Length: 246 ft (75 m) overall (first three); 250 ft 9 in (76.43 m) overall (second three)
- Beam: 24 ft 3.75 in (7.4105 m)
- Draught: 8 ft 6 in (2.59 m)
- Propulsion: 3 x Yarrow boilers, Parsons turbines, 10,000 hp (7,500 kW), 3 shafts
- Speed: 26 knots (48 km/h; 30 mph)
- Range: 2,690 nautical miles (4,980 km; 3,100 mi) at 11.5 knots (21.3 km/h; 13.2 mph)
- Complement: 66–73
- Armament: 1 × BL 4-inch (100 mm) Mk VIII gun; 3 × QF 12 pounder 12 cwt naval guns; 3 × 18-inch (450mm) torpedo tubes

The River class was a class of six torpedo-boat destroyers operated by the Royal Australian Navy (RAN). The design was based on a modified version of the British River-class destroyer, 13 of which were planned under the 1904 Naval Estimates, but were cancelled before orders were placed. The first batch of three ships was ordered for the Commonwealth Naval Forces in 1909, followed later by a second batch of three a few years later. All six vessels are named after Australian rivers.

The Rivers saw service during World War I. Ships of the class participated in the Australian Naval and Military Expeditionary Force capture of German New Guinea, and performed patrols in Australian and Malayan waters. In 1917, the class was deployed as a single unit to the Mediterranean, and assigned to anti-submarine patrols of the Adriatic. The destroyers returned to Australia in 1919, and were placed in reserve.

All six ships of the class were disposed of by the 1930s. Three were sold for use as accommodation hulks (two to the NSW Penal Department, the third to Cockatoo Island Dockyard) and later sank. The other three were sunk as target ships. The bow and stern sections of HMAS Parramatta were recovered in 1973 and are preserved as memorials.

== Design and construction ==
In October 1905 the newly appointed Naval Officer Commanding the Commonwealth Naval Forces (the post-Federation amalgamation of the Australian colonial navies), Captain William Creswell, proposed a navy of three large cruiser-destroyers (capable of dealing with commerce raiders), plus 16 smaller destroyers and 15 torpedo boats for local defence. The first instalment of the ambitious plan was the River-class, bids for which were received from British shipbuilders on 24 July 1907. A consortium of Fairfields and Dennys was chosen as the prime contractors, and the design was drawn by Prof. John H. Biles^{(GE)} of Glasgow University, based on HMS Teviot, Yarrow's variant of the RN River Class.

The destroyers of this class had a displacement of 750 tons. The first three had a length overall of 246 feet (75 m), while the second three were longer at 250 feet 9 inches (76.43 m). They were powered by three oil-burning Yarrow boilers connected to Parsons turbines, which delivered 10,000 shaft horsepower (7,500 kW) to three propeller shafts. Cruising speed was 11.5 knots (21.3 km/h; 13.2 mph), giving the ship a range of 2,690 nautical miles (4,980 km; 3,100 mi), and maximum speed was 26 knots (48 km/h; 30 mph). Each ship's company consisted of between 66 and 73 personnel, including five officers. The destroyers' main armament consisted of a single BL 4-inch Mark VIII naval gun, supplemented by three QF 12 pounder 12 cwt naval guns. They were also fitted with three .303-inch machine guns and three single 18-inch torpedo tubes.

The first three ships, Parramatta, Yarra and Warrego, were ordered on 6 February 1909. Another three ships, Huon, Swan, and Torrens, were ordered later. On the advice of the British Admiralty, the ships were named after Australian rivers (one from each state), although the original intention of using rivers with Aboriginal name origins did not carry through to the second batch. Senator George Pearce requested that they instead be named after famous navigators, but was overruled by Prime Minister Alfred Deakin. Huon was originally to be named Derwent, but this was changed before launch to avoid confusion with the British E-class (formerly River-class) destroyer HMS Derwent.

Parramatta and Yarra were the first new ships launched for the Australian navy. After completion, the two vessels were temporarily commissioned into the Royal Navy for the delivery voyage to Australia, although they reverted to the control of the Commonwealth Naval Forces on arrival in Broome. Warrego, however, was built up to launch condition, then disassembled, transported to Australia by ship, and rebuilt at Cockatoo Island Dockyard: the reasoning behind this was to raise the standard of the Australian shipbuilding industry by giving Cockatoo Island hands-on experience in warship construction. The second batch of three warships were all built at Cockatoo Island.

== Operational history ==
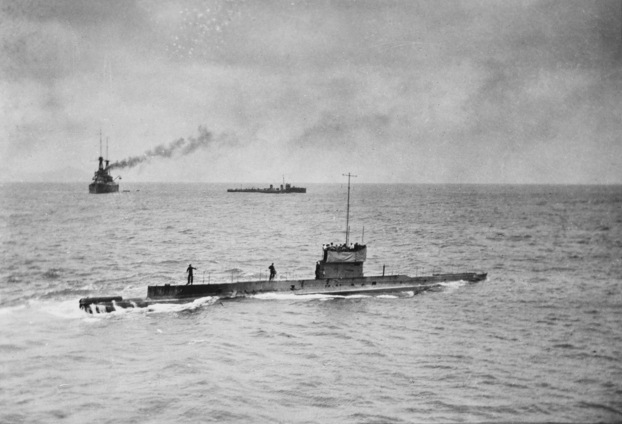
The battlecruiser Australia and a River-class destroyer (background) rendezvous with the submarine AE1 (foreground) in September 1914

The first three destroyers were operating with the Australian fleet at the start of World War I. The three ships were assigned to the Australian Naval and Military Expeditionary Force, and participated in the capture of German New Guinea. After the conclusion of the campaign, the destroyers were assigned to home waters for a short period, then assigned to Malayan and surrounding waters until late 1916. During August and September, the second group of River-class destroyers began relieving the ships of the first group from Malayan patrols, with Parramatta, Yarra, and Warrego returning to Australia.

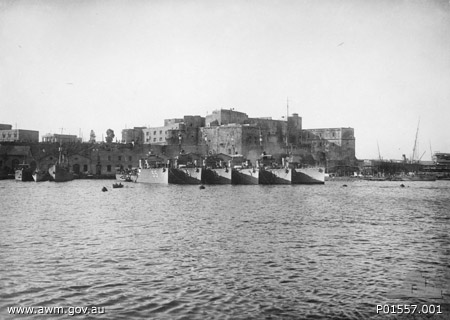
Five River-class ships with a British destroyer at Brindisi in 1917

In July 1917, all six ships rendezvoused off the Cocos Islands: the first time the entire class had been in one location. From there, the River-class destroyers proceeded to the Mediterranean. On arrival at Malta, they were immediately deployed as escorts for a convoy. After this, the destroyers were modified for anti-submarine warfare: the aftmost torpedo tube was removed and replaced with depth charge rails. From August 1917, the six destroyers were based at Brindisi, Italy, assigned to patrol the Adriatic and prevent enemy submarines using it as a route to the Mediterranean.

After a brief refit and leave period in England after the war's end, and the re-installation of their torpedo tubes at Malta, the six destroyers returned to Australian waters in March 1919. They were placed in reserve, and had all been disposed of by the 1930s.

== Decommissioning and fate ==
After decommissioning, Parramatta and Swan were stripped down and sold to the NSW Penal Department for use as prisoner accommodation on the Hawkesbury River. The two hulks were then sold into private hands; after plans to use them as fishers' accommodation, they were used to transport metal to islands along the river. In 1934, Swan and Parramatta were being towed along the river to the ship breakers when heavy weather caused the hulks to break free of their towing vessel; Swan sank, and Parramatta ran aground. The two ships were abandoned, although in 1973, the bow and stern of Parramatta were salvaged for use as memorials.

Warrego was used as accommodation at Cockatoo Island. She sank at her berth, and was later demolished. Yarra, Torrens, and Huon were all scuttled outside Sydney Heads after being used as target ships.

== Ships of the class ==
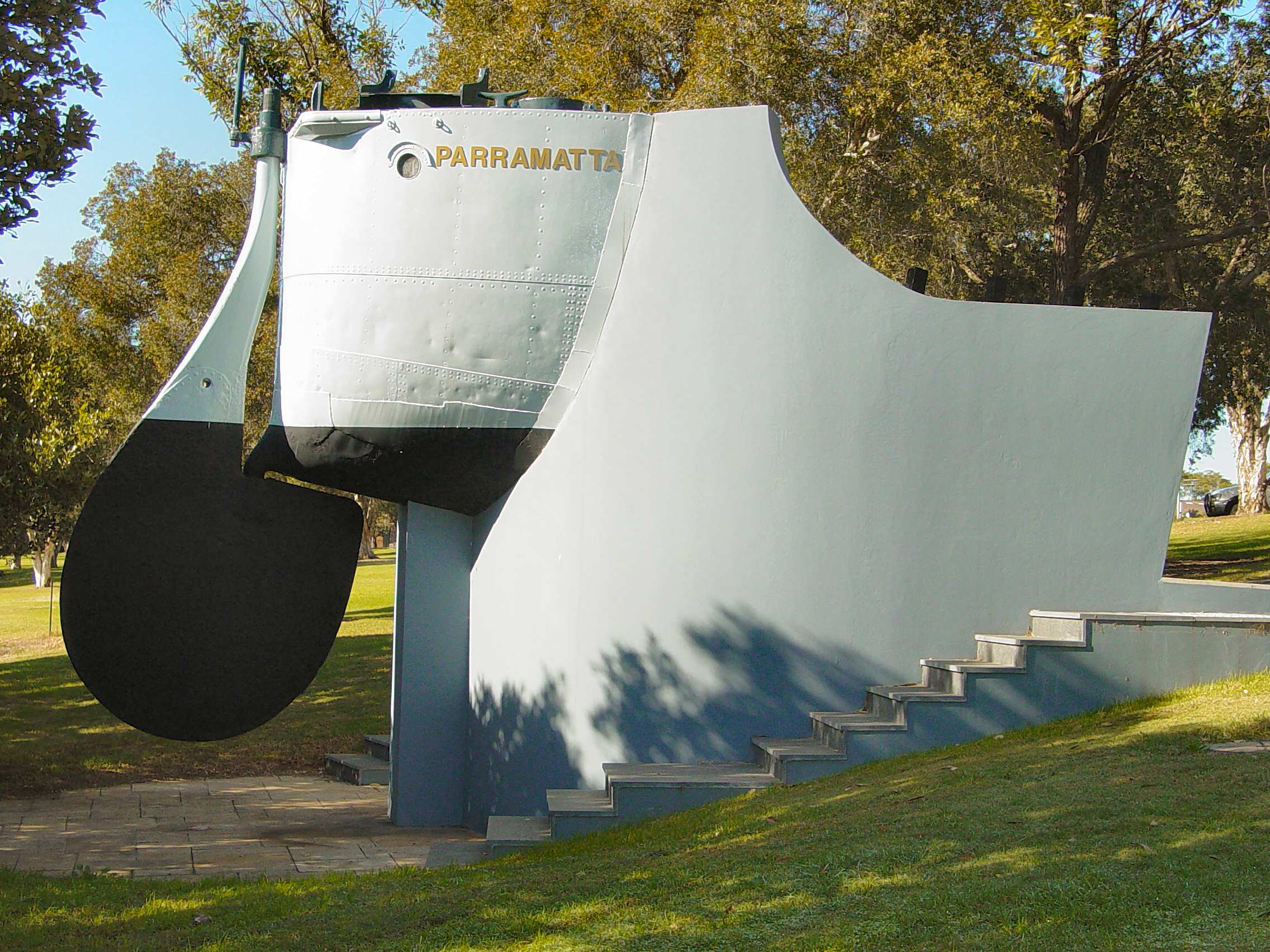
The stern of HMAS Parramatta, preserved as the HMAS Parramatta Memorial in Parramatta, New South Wales

Name	Ship Builder	Laid down	Launched	Commissioned	Decommissioned	Fate
First group
Parramatta	Fairfield Shipbuilding and Engineering Company Limited, Govan, Glasgow	17 March 1909	9 February 1910	10 September 1910	20 April 1928	Hulk sold into private service, ran aground in 1934. Sections later salvaged for memorials.
Yarra	William Denny & Brothers, Dumbarton	1909	9 April 1910	1 March 1911	10 May 1928	Broken up, hulk sunk as target in 1929
Warrego	Laid down: Fairfield Shipbuilding and Engineering Company Limited, Govan; Reconstructed from parts: Cockatoo Dockyard, Sydney	December 1910 (Cockatoo)	4 April 1911	1 June 1912	19 April 1928	Used as accommodation at Cockatoo Island, sank in 1931
Second group
Huon	Cockatoo Dockyard, Sydney	25 January 1913	19 December 1914	14 December 1915	7 June 1928	Broken up, hulk sunk as target in 1931
Swan	Cockatoo Dockyard, Sydney	22 January 1913	11 December 1915	16 August 1916	15 May 1928	Hulk sold into private service, Sank under tow in 1934
Torrens	Cockatoo Dockyard, Sydney	25 January 1913	28 August 1915	3 July 1916	19 July 1920 (to reserve)	Broken up, hulk sunk as target in 1930
