= HMAS Huon (D50) =

River-class torpedo-boat destroyer of the Royal Australian Navy

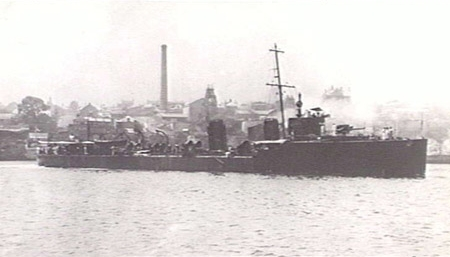
- HMAS Huon during her trials in December 1915

History

Australia
- Namesake: Huon River
- Builder: Cockatoo Docks and Engineering Company
- Laid down: 25 January 1913
- Launched: 19 December 1914
- Completed: 4 February 1916
- Commissioned: 14 December 1915
- Decommissioned: 7 June 1928
- Honours and awards: Battle honour: Adriatic 1917–18
- Fate: Scuttled 10 April 1931

General characteristics
- Class & type: River-class torpedo-boat destroyer
- Displacement: 700 tons
- Length: 259 ft 9 in (79.17 m) length overall; 245 ft (75 m) between perpendiculars
- Beam: 24 ft 3.375 in (7.40093 m)
- Draught: 8 ft 10 in (2.69 m)
- Propulsion: 3 Yarrow boilers, Parsons geared turbines, 10,000 SHP, 3 propellers
- Speed: 26 knots (48 km/h; 30 mph) designed; 25.775 knots (47.735 km/h; 29.661 mph) mean trial speed; 10 knots (19 km/h; 12 mph) economical
- Complement: 5 officers and 60 sailors
- Armament: 1 × 4-inch Mark VIII gun; 3 × 12-pounder guns; 1 × .303-inch Maxim gun; 2 × .303-inch Lewis guns; 3 × torpedo tubes for 18-inch torpedoes (1 removed 1918); 4 × depth charge chutes (installed 1917, 2 removed 1919); 2 × depth charge throwers (installed 1918)

HMAS Huon (D50), named after the Huon River, was a River-class torpedo-boat destroyer of the Royal Australian Navy (RAN). Originally to be named after the River Derwent, the ship was renamed before her 1914 launch because of a naming conflict with a Royal Navy vessel.

Huon was commissioned into the RAN in late 1915, and after completion was deployed to the Far East. In mid-1917, Huon and her five sister ships were transferred to the Mediterranean. Huon served as a convoy escort and anti-submarine patrol ship until a collision with sister ship HMAS Yarra in August 1918 saw Huon drydocked for the rest of World War I. After a refit in England, Huon returned to Australia in 1919.

The destroyer spent several periods alternating between commissioned and reserve status over the next nine years, with the last three spent as a reservist training ship. Huon was decommissioned for the final time in 1928, and was scuttled in 1931 after being used as a target ship.

== Design and construction ==
Huon was one of the second batch of River-class torpedo-boat destroyers ordered for the RAN. She had a displacement of 700 tons, was 259 feet 9 inches (79.17 m) long overall and 245 feet (75 m) long between perpendiculars, had a beam of 24 feet 3.375 inches (7.40093 m), and a maximum draught of 8 feet 10 inches (2.69 m). Propulsion was provided by three Yarrow-made boilers connected to Parsons geared turbines, which supplied 10,000 shaft horsepower to the three propellers. Although designed to reach speeds of 26 knots (48 km/h; 30 mph), the destroyer could only achieve a mean speed of 25.775 knots (47.735 km/h; 29.661 mph) during high-speed trials. Her economical cruising speed was 10 knots (19 km/h; 12 mph). The ship's company consisted of 5 officers and 60 sailors.

At launch, the ship's armament consisted of a single 4-inch Mark VIII gun, three 12-pounder guns, a .303-inch Maxim gun, two .303-inch Lewis guns, and three revolving torpedo tubes for 18-inch torpedoes. Four depth charge chutes were installed in 1917, although two were later removed in 1919. Two depth charge throwers were added during a 1918 refit; at the same time, one of the torpedo tubes was removed.

The ship was laid down at Cockatoo Island Dockyard on 25 January 1913. She was launched on 19 December 1914 by the wife of federal politician Jens Jensen. Huon was commissioned into the RAN on 14 December 1915, and completed on 4 February 1916. The ship was originally to be named HMAS Derwent, after the Derwent River, but this was changed after the British Admiralty complained that there would be easy confusion with the Royal Navy destroyer HMS Derwent.

== Operational history ==
Huon first served with the British Far East Patrol, based at Sandakan, then later Singapore, from June 1916 to May 1917. On 7 July 1917, Huon met her five sister ships off the Cocos Islands, with the six vessels sailing to the Mediterranean via Diego Garcia. Huon joined the escort of a convoy from Port Said to Malta, and arrived on 20 August, after which the destroyer was docked for a month-long refit.

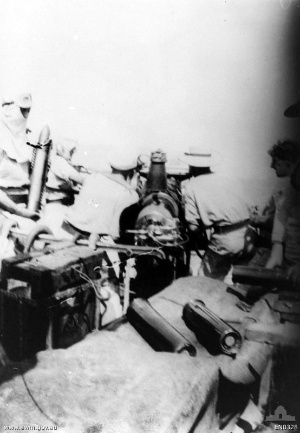
Huon in action with a 12-pounder gun in the Adriatic Sea, circa. 1917 – 1918

From October 1917 until April 1918, Huon was based at Brindisi to patrol for Austrian submarines. From 17 April to 16 May, the ship underwent another refit in Malta, then returned to Brisindi. On 9 August 1918, while operating in the Straits of Otranto, Huon collided with sister ship HMAS Yarra. Huon was sent to Genoa for repairs. While in drydock, the ship was hit by the 1918 flu pandemic: four stokers and a lieutenant died from influenza between late October and early November. Huon left dockyard hands a day before World War I ended. The six River-class ships made for Portsmouth, with Huon docking for refit on 14 January 1919. Released on 28 February, Huon joined her sister ships and the cruiser HMAS Melbourne for the voyage to Australia. The ships reached Sydney on 21 May. Although not recognised at the time, an overhaul of the RAN battle honours system in 2010 recognised Huon's wartime service with the honour "Adriatic 1917–18".

Huon recommissioned at Sydney on 1 August 1919, and operated in local waters over the course of the next year, including a stint escorting the battlecruiser HMS Renown during the visit of Edward, Prince of Wales in early 1920. The destroyer was placed in reserve in August 1920. Huon was reactivated on 22 April 1921. On 9 February 1922, the destroyer was holed below the waterline in a collision with the submarine HMAS J4. Repairs were successful, but Huon returned to reserve on 31 May. The destroyer was recommissioned on 29 August 1925, and served as a reservist training ship at Hobart until 26 May 1928, when she returned to Sydney.

== Decommissioning and fate ==
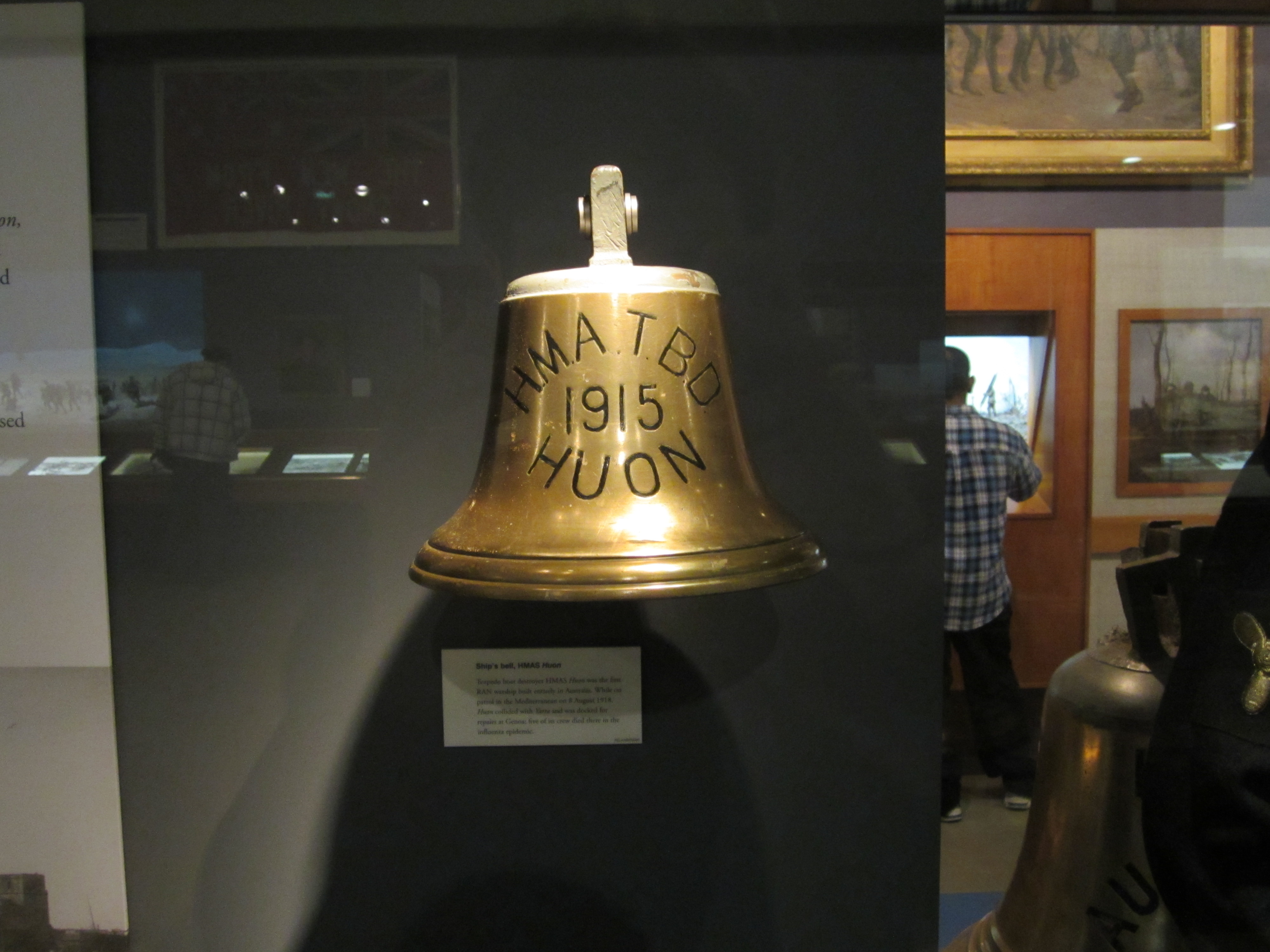
HMAS Huon's bell on display at the Australian War Memorial in August 2012

Huon was decommissioned for the final time on 7 June 1928. On 10 April 1931, the destroyer was towed out to sea off Sydney, and was used as a gunnery target ship by Australia, Canberra, Anzac, and Albatross, before being scuttled in 33°58′S 151°36′E. Her bell currently resides at the Australian War Memorial.
