= HMAS Parramatta (D55) =

River-class torpedo-boat destroyer of the Royal Australian Navy

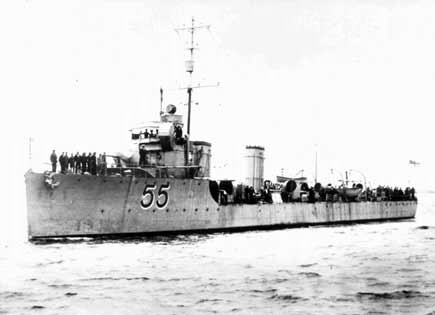
- Parramatta in 1918

History

Australia
- Name: Parramatta
- Namesake: Parramatta River
- Ordered: 13 March 1909
- Builder: Fairfield Shipbuilding & Engineering Company, Govan
- Laid down: 17 March 1909
- Launched: 9 February 1910
- Commissioned: 10 September 1910
- Decommissioned: 20 April 1928
- Honours and awards: Battle honours: Rabaul 1914; Adriatic 1917–18
- Fate: Sold for scrap, some components later converted into memorials
- Badge

General characteristics
- Class & type: River-class torpedo-boat destroyer
- Displacement: 750 long tons (760 t)
- Length: 245 ft (74.7 m) (o/a)
- Beam: 24 ft 3 in (7.4 m)
- Draught: 8 ft 6 in (2.59 m)
- Installed power: 3 × Yarrow boilers; 11,500 shp (8,600 kW)
- Propulsion: 3 shafts; Parsons steam turbine set
- Speed: 26 knots (48 km/h; 30 mph)
- Range: 2,690 nmi (4,980 km; 3,100 mi) at 11.5 knots (21.3 km/h; 13.2 mph)
- Complement: 66–73
- Armament: 1 × single 4 in (102 mm) gun; 3 × single 12-pdr (3 in (76 mm)) guns; 3 × single 18 in (450 mm) torpedo tubes

HMAS Parramatta, named after the Parramatta River, was a River-class torpedo-boat destroyer of the Royal Australian Navy (RAN). Ordered in 1909 for the Commonwealth Naval Forces (the predecessor of the RAN), Parramatta was the first ship launched for the RAN. Temporarily commissioned into the Royal Navy for the delivery voyage to Australia, the destroyer came under Australian naval control in 1910, and was recommissioned into the RAN on 1 March 1911, shortly before the latter's formal creation.

After the beginning of the First World War in 1914 until 1917, Parramatta conducted patrols in the Pacific and South-East Asia, before she and her sister ships were transferred to the Mediterranean for anti-submarine operations. She returned to Australia in 1919 and was placed in reserve. Apart from a brief period of full commission during the visit of the Prince of Wales in 1920, Parramatta remained in reserve until 1928. She was fully decommissioned in 1928, stripped of parts, and sold for use as prisoner accommodation on the Hawkesbury River. After changing hands several times, the hull ran aground during a gale in 1933, and was left to rust. In 1973, the bow and stern sections were salvaged, and converted into memorials.

== Description ==
The Australian River-class destroyers had an overall length of 245 feet (74.7 m), a beam of 24 feet 3 inches (7.4 m) and a draft of 8 feet 6 inches (2.6 m). They displaced 750 long tons (760 t) at normal load. The destroyers were powered by one set of Parsons steam turbines that drove three propeller shafts using steam provided by three Yarrow boilers. The turbines were rated at 11,500 shaft horsepower (8,600 kW) which was designed to give the ships a speed of 26 knots (48 km/h; 30 mph). During her sea trials, Parramatta was able to achieve 27.3 knots (50.6 km/h; 31.4 mph). The ships could carry enough fuel oil to give them a range of 2,690 nautical miles (4,980 km; 3,100 mi) at a speed of 11.5 knots (21.3 km/h; 13.2 mph). The ship's company consisted of between 66 and 73 crewmen, including five officers. The ship were armed with a single BL 4-inch (102 mm) Mk VIII gun in a platform on the forecastle, three 12-pounder (3-inch (76 mm)) 12 cwt guns (Note: "Cwt" is the abbreviation for hundredweight, 20 cwt referring to the weight of the gun.) in single mounts, one on each broadside amidships and the third on the quarterdeck. They were also fitted with three 18-inch (450 mm) torpedo tubes in rotating single mounts, two aft of the rear funnel and the last on the quarterdeck at the stern.

== Construction and career ==
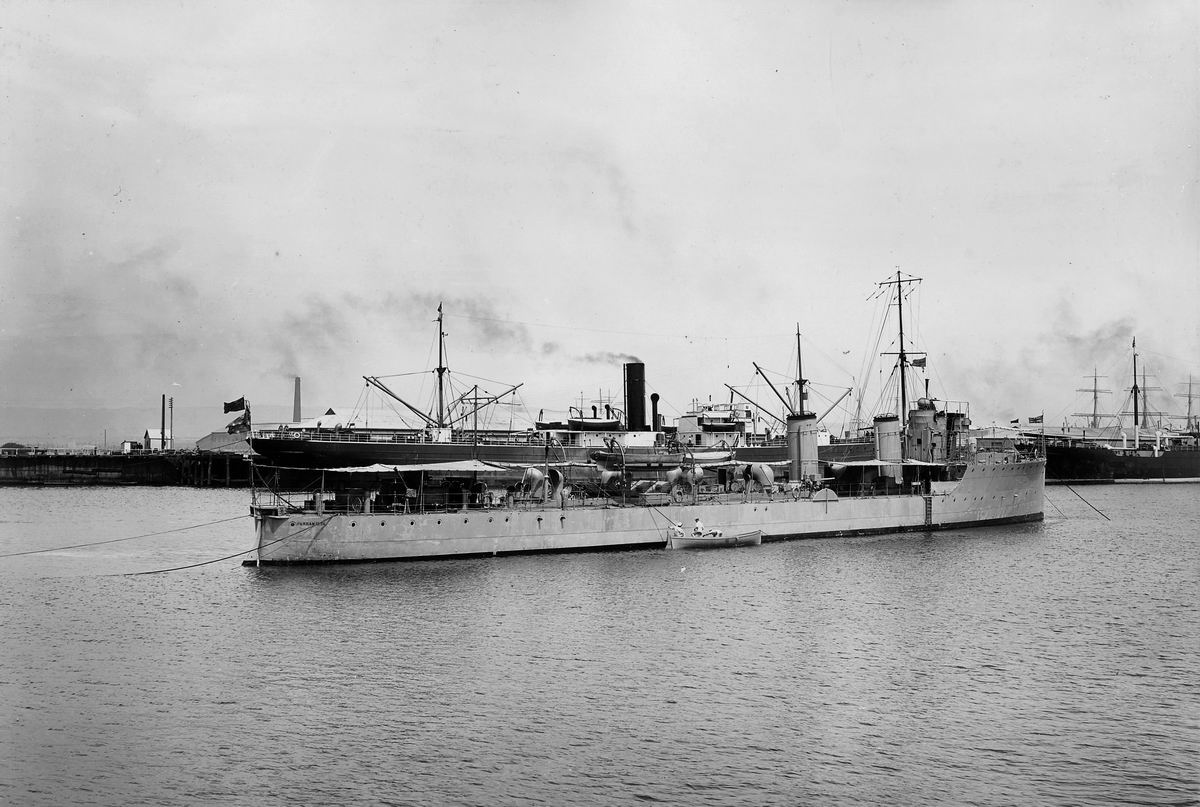
Parramatta anchored in Port Adelaide in December 1910, shortly after arriving in Australian waters for the first time

Parramatta, along with sister ships Yarra and Warrego, were ordered on 13 March 1909; the first ships to be ordered for the Commonwealth Naval Forces, the post-Federation amalgamation of the Australian colonial navies. The ship was laid down by Fairfield Shipbuilding & Engineering Company, at its shipyard in Govan, Scotland, on 17 March. She was launched on 9 February 1910 by Margot Asquith, wife of British Prime Minister Herbert Asquith; the first new ship launched for the Australian navy. Construction was completed on 10 September, and the ship was commissioned into the Royal Navy as HMS Parramatta for the voyage out to Australia. Parramatta and sister ship Yarra sailed from Portsmouth on 19 September. Once the ships arrived in Broome in December, they were transferred to the control of the Commonwealth Naval Forces.

After entering Australian control, the two ships sailed to Melbourne for a gala welcome. During the celebrations, the ship's engineering officer fell overboard and drowned. On 1 March 1911, Parramatta was recommissioned as His Majesty's Australian Ship, although the HMAS prefix was not officially approved until 10 July, when King George V granted permission for the Commonwealth Naval Forces to be renamed the Royal Australian Navy. On 4 October 1913, Parramatta took part in a formal fleet entry into Sydney Harbour welcoming the battlecruiser HMAS Australia.

=== World War I ===
During the early stages of World War I, Parramatta operated with the Australian fleet in the search for the German East Asia Squadron, then was involved in the capture of German colonies in the South Pacific region, including German New Guinea, and the consolidation of Allied occupation in these regions. On 5 February 1915, Parramatta and sister ships Yarra and HMAS Warrego sailed for Australia, where they were used for convoy escort duties along the continent's eastern coast until November. The ships were refitted at Sydney, then sent to patrol the region around Malaya, the East Indies, and the Philippines. Parramatta returned to Australia on 17 July 1916, and patrolled home waters until 17 May 1917, when she and her sister ships were ordered to Malta.

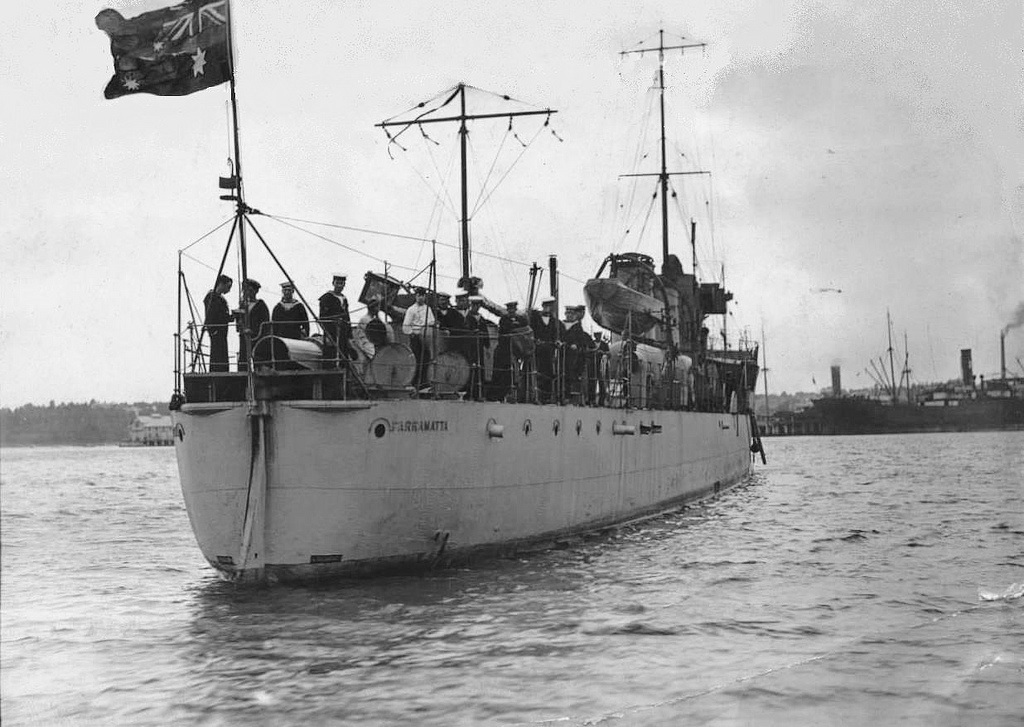
Stern view of Parramatta with crew on deck. The ship is flying the Australian National Flag from the stern instead of a naval ensign.

On arrival, the six River-class ships were to undergo anti-submarine training, but were instead immediately deployed on convoy escort operations from Port Said to Malta. On 16 August, lookouts aboard Parramatta spotted the wake from a periscope. The destroyer sped to the area of the sighting, and dropped a depth charge on a submarine travelling just below the surface. After completing the convoy run, the Australian warships completed the training, and were assigned to patrols of the Adriatic. For this, Parramatta was fitted with an observation balloon. On 16 November 1917, Parramatta and several sister ships came to assist the Italian transport Orione, whose stern had been destroyed by a torpedo. Parramatta towed the stricken ship towards the mainland, while Warrego and Swan recovered survivors and Yarra chased the attacking submarine. Apart from this, the patrols were uneventful, and on 28 September 1918, Parramatta was refitted in Greece before joining Allied forces at Constantinople. During October 1918, following the surrender of Turkish forces, Parramatta accepted the surrender of a German admiral assigned to the area. The destroyer was then used for mail runs between Constantinople and Sevastopol, Russia, until December, when she sailed to Devonport, arriving on 14 January 1919.

During her career, Parramatta received no honours or awards for her activities during World War I. Following an overhaul of the RAN battle honours system, completed in 2010, the ship's wartime service was retroactively recognised with the honours "Rabaul 1914" and "Adriatic 1917–18".

=== Post-war ===
On 6 March 1919, Parramatta sailed for home, in company with several other Australian ships. Parramatta and Yarra ran out of fuel on 26 April, less than a day out from Darwin, and had to be towed into port by Warrego. The destroyer paid off into reserve at Sydney on 22 July 1919. She was recommissioned for the period 17 May to 13 June 1920 for the visit of the Prince of Wales aboard the battlecruiser HMS Renown, then was returned to reserve. From October 1924 until November 1925, Parramatta was based at Westernport, Victoria for use as a training ship, then spent time in Sydney, then Adelaide, before returning to Sydney in April 1928.

== Decommissioning and fate ==
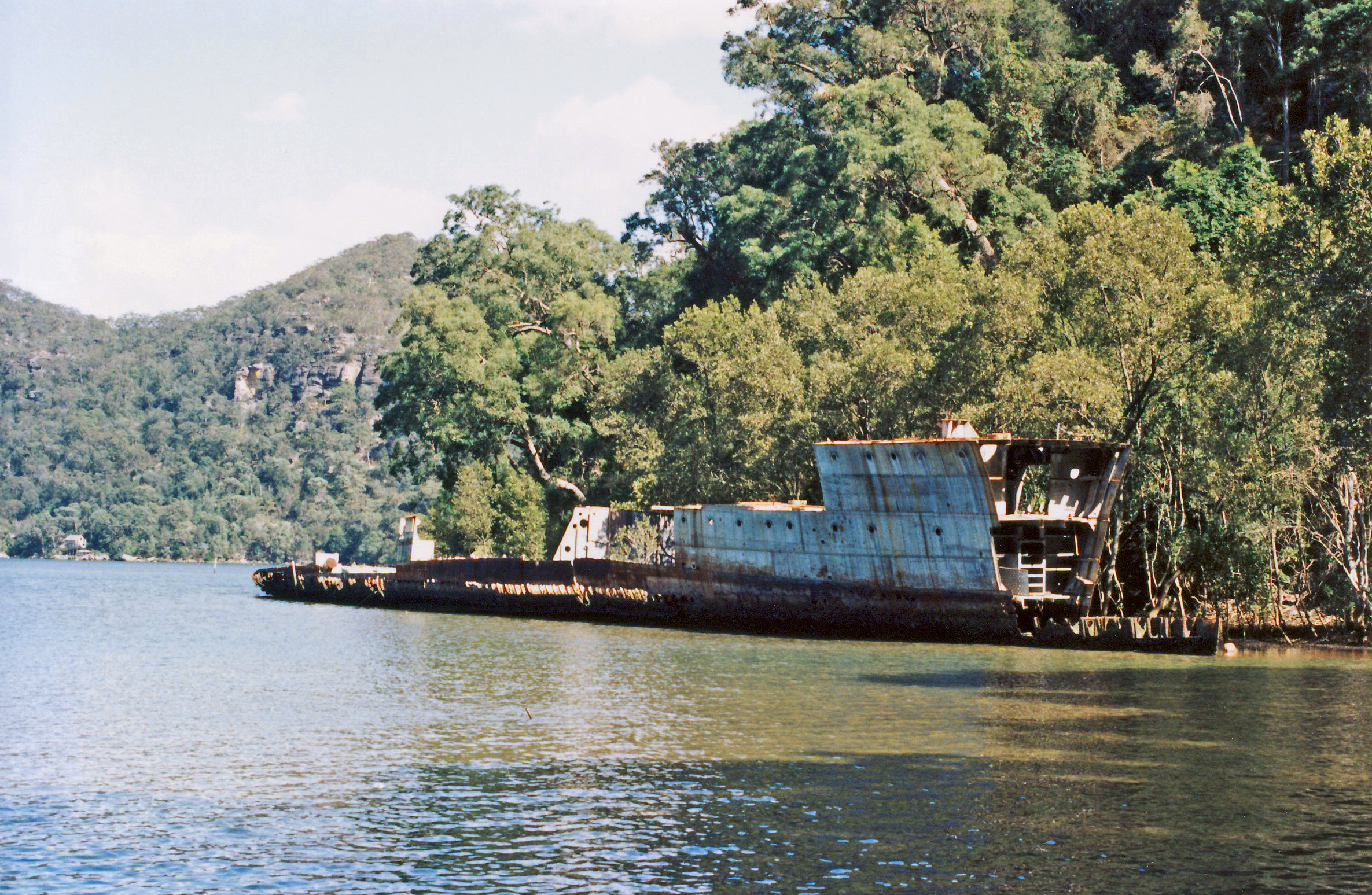
The wreck of Parramatta in the Hawkesbury River

Parramatta was paid off from service on 20 April 1928 and handed over to the Cockatoo Island Dockyard for dismantling on 17 October. Parramatta and Swan were stripped down, and their hulks were sold to the New South Wales Penal Department and towed to Cowan Creek, where they were used to house prisoner labourers working on roads along the Hawkesbury River. The two hulks were then sold in 1933 for 12 pounds each to George Rhodes of Cowan, New South Wales, who intended to use them as accommodation for fishers. This was opposed, and the ships were sold on to a pair of fishermen, who used them to transport blue metal to Milson and Peat Islands.

On 2 February 1934, Parramatta and Swan were being towed down the Hawkesbury River scrapped in Sydney, when a gale caused both hulls to break their tows; Swan foundered and sank, while Parramatta ran aground in a mangrove swamp opposite Milson Island and was abandoned in position 33°30.07′S 151°10.88′E. In 1973, the bow and stern sections of Parramatta were salvaged, with the stern established as a memorial on the south bank of the Parramatta River in Parramatta, and the bow later placed outside the Royal Australian Navy Heritage Centre, at the northern tip of the naval base at Garden Island, New South Wales. The wreck and bow and stern sections are heritage listed.
