= HMAS Warrego (D70) =

River-class torpedo-boat destroyer of the Royal Australian Navy

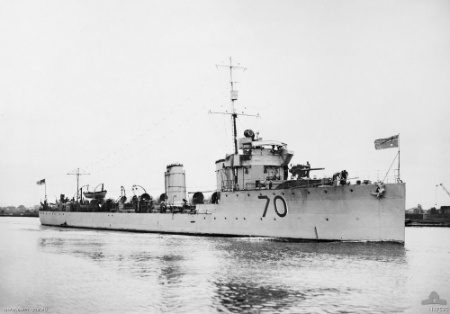

History

Australia
- Namesake: Warrego River
- Builder: Fairfield Shipbuilding and Engineering Company; Cockatoo Island Dockyard
- Laid down: December 1910
- Launched: 4 April 1911
- Commissioned: 1 June 1912
- Decommissioned: 19 April 1928
- Honours and awards: Battle honours: Rabaul 1914; Adriatic 1917–18
- Fate: Sank while in use as accommodation hulk 23 July 1931
- Badge

General characteristics
- Class & type: River-class torpedo-boat destroyer
- Displacement: 700 tons
- Length: 246 ft (75 m) length overall
- Beam: 24 ft 3.5 in (7.404 m)
- Draught: 8 ft 10 in (2.69 m)
- Propulsion: 3 × Yarrow boilers, Parsons turbines, 10,000 shp (7,500 kW), 3 shafts
- Speed: 26 knots (48 km/h; 30 mph)
- Range: 2,690 nautical miles (4,980 km; 3,100 mi) at 11.5 knots (21.3 km/h; 13.2 mph)
- Complement: 66–73
- Armament: 1 × BL 4-inch Mk VIII gun; 3 × QF 12-pounder 12 cwt naval guns; 3 × .303-inch machine guns; 3 × 18-inch torpedo tubes; Depth charge chutes and throwers (installed later)

HMAS Warrego, named for the Warrego River, was a River-class torpedo-boat destroyer of the Royal Australian Navy (RAN). Ordered in 1909, construction of the destroyer started in Scotland, but she was then broken down and reassembled at Cockatoo Island Dockyard in order for the Australian shipbuilding industry to gain experience in warship construction. Warrego was commissioned into the RAN in 1912, and spent her early career operating in Australian waters.

At the start of World War I, Warrego was assigned to the Australian force tasked with neutralising German colonies in the region, along with finding and destroying the German East Asia Squadron. She was involved in the capture of Rabaul and the Battle of Bita Paka during 1914.

After patrol work in Australian, New Guinea, and South-east Asian waters, Warrego and her sister ships were assigned to the Mediterranean in 1917, and served as an anti-submarine patrol force. The ship participated in the Second Battle of Durazzo in 1918. Following the war's end, Warrego returned to Australia, and was placed in reserve.

The destroyer was reactivated for short periods in 1920 and 1928, but was paid off in 1928 and marked for disposal. The destroyer was partially disassembled, then used as an accommodation hulk at Cockatoo Island. Warrego sank at her berth in 1931, and was demolished with underwater charges.

== Design and construction ==
Warrego had a displacement of 700 tons, a length overall of 246 feet (75 m), and beam of 24 feet 3.5 inches (7.404 m), and a maximum draught of 8 feet 10 inches (2.69 m). The destroyer was powered by three Yarrow oil-burning boilers connected to Parsons turbines, which delivered 10,000 shaft horsepower to three propeller shafts.

Warrego's maximum speed was 26 knots (48 km/h; 30 mph), and she had a cruising speed of 11.5 knots (21.3 km/h; 13.2 mph), giving the ship a range of 2,690 nautical miles (4,980 km; 3,100 mi). The ship's company consisted of between 66 and 73 personnel, including five officers.

The destroyer's main armament consisted of a single BL 4-inch Mark VIII naval gun, supplemented by three QF 12-pounder 12 cwt naval guns. She was also fitted with three .303-inch machine guns and three single 18-inch torpedo tubes. Later in Warrego's career, the destroyer was fitted with four chutes and two throwers for depth charges.

Warrego, along with sister ships Yarra and Parramatta, were ordered on 6 February 1909; the first ships to be ordered for the Commonwealth Naval Forces, the post-Federation amalgamation of the Australian colonial navies. Warrego was laid down by Fairfield Shipbuilding and Engineering Company, but when she reached launch condition, the destroyer was disassembled and transported to Australia by ship. She was re-laid at Cockatoo Island Dockyard in December 1910. The reasoning behind this was to raise the standard of the Australian shipbuilding industry by giving Cockatoo Island hands-on experience in warship construction.

The destroyer was launched on 4 April 1911 by the wife of George Pearce, the Minister for Defence. Warrego was completed on 1 June 1912, and was commissioned into the RAN that day. The destroyer's name comes from the Warrego River.

== Operational history ==
During the early part of the destroyer's career, Warrego operated in Australian waters. At the start of World War I, Warrego was assigned to the Australian force tasked with neutralising German colonies in the region, along with finding and destroying the German East Asia Squadron. On the night of 11 August 1914, Warrego and sister ship Yarra were tasked with entering Simpson Harbour at Rabaul to find and lure the German ships into the guns of the battlecruiser HMAS Australia, but found no ships in harbour.

During late August and early September, the destroyer escorted the Australian Naval and Military Expeditionary Force to New Britain, and was involved in the landing of troops at Kabakaul to capture a nearby wireless station. Apart from a brief docking in Sydney, Warrego remained in the New Guinea area until 5 February 1915, when she was reassigned to patrols along the east coast of Australia. In October, she sailed to Borneo, and carried out patrols in the region until August 1916.

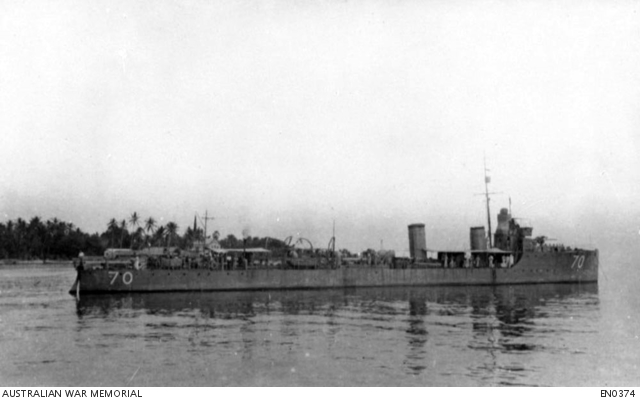
Warrego at Dili, Portuguese Timor, in 1917, en route to the Mediterranean

In October 1917, Warrego and her five sister ships were assigned to the Mediterranean. Based at Brindisi, the destroyers were assigned to anti-submarine patrols of the Adriatic. Warrego fought at the Second Battle of Durazzo on 2 October 1918, shelling the Austrian port.

At the end of the war, Warrego was briefly deployed to the Black Sea before sailing to Gibraltar. The ship earned two battle honours for her wartime service: "Rabaul 1914" and "Adriatic 1917–18".

The six destroyers, accompanying the cruiser Melbourne, arrived in Darwin on 26 March 1919: Warrego had to tow Parramatta and Yarra into harbour, as they ran out of fuel. On 20 July, Warrego was placed in reserve. Warrego was briefly recommissioned from 17 January to 23 August 1920 for the visit of the Prince of Wales to Australia, then recommissioned again on 27 March 1928 for training purposes.

== Decommissioning and fate ==
Warrego was paid off for the final time on 19 April 1928. She was partially disassembled at Cockatoo Island during 1929, then moored at the island for use as an accommodation hulk. On 23 July 1931, the ship sank at her berth (at location 33°50′49.4″S 151°10′17.9″E) , and had to be broken up with underwater demolition charges.
