= HMAS Swan (D61) =

River-class torpedo-boat destroyer of the Royal Australian Navy

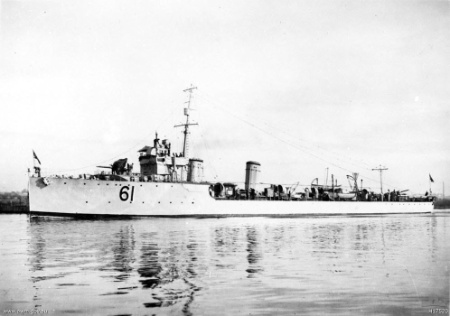
- HMAS Swan during World War I (1914–1918)

History

Australia
- Namesake: Swan River
- Builder: Cockatoo Docks and Engineering Company at Sydney
- Laid down: 22 January 1913
- Launched: 11 December 1915
- Commissioned: 16 August 1916
- Decommissioned: 15 May 1928
- Honours and awards: Battle honour: Adriatic 1917–18
- Fate: Sunk under tow in 1934

General characteristics
- Class & type: River-class torpedo-boat destroyer
- Displacement: 750 tons
- Length: 250 ft 9 in (76.43 m) length overall; 245 ft (75 m) between perpendiculars
- Beam: 24 ft 4 in (7.42 m)
- Draught: 8 ft 10 in (2.69 m) maximum
- Propulsion: 3 × Yarrow boilers, Parsons turbines, 10,000 shp (7,500 kW), 3 shafts
- Speed: 26.5 knots (49.1 km/h; 30.5 mph)
- Range: 2,690 nautical miles (4,980 km; 3,100 mi) at 11.5 knots (21.3 km/h; 13.2 mph)
- Complement: 4 officers, 67 sailors
- Armament: 1 × BL 4-inch Mk VIII gun; 3 × QF 12-pounder 12 cwt guns; 3 × 18 inch (450 mm) torpedo tubes; 3 × .303-inch machine gunss; Depth charge chutes and throwers (installed later)

HMAS Swan was a River-class torpedo-boat destroyer of the Royal Australian Navy (RAN). One of six built for the RAN, Swan was built at Cockatoo Island Dockyard, and entered service in 1916. The early part of the ship's career was spent on blockade duty in the Far East, before she was transferred to the Mediterranean for anti-submarine duty. Apart from performing shore bombardment during the Second Battle of Durazzo, Swan's wartime career was uneventful.

The destroyer was placed in reserve in 1920, but was reactivated between 1925 and 1927 and assigned to Tasmania. Swan was decommissioned in 1928, stripped of parts, and sold for use as prisoner accommodation on the Hawkesbury River. After changing hands several times, the hull sank during gale conditions in 1934.

== Design and construction ==
Swan was one of six River-class torpedo-boat destroyers built for the RAN. The destroyer had a displacement of 750 tons, was 250 feet 9 inches (76.43 m) long overall and 245 feet (75 m) long between perpendiculars, had a beam of 24 feet 4 inches (7.42 m), and a maximum draught of 8 feet 10 inches (2.69 m). Propulsion machinery consisted of three Yarrow boilers feeding Parsons turbines, which supplied 10,000 shaft horsepower (7,500 kW) to the ship's three propeller shafts.

Although designed to reach 26 knots (48 km/h; 30 mph), Swan was capable of reaching a maximum speed half a knot greater. Maximum range was 2,690 nautical miles (4,980 km; 3,100 mi) at 11.5 knots (21.3 km/h; 13.2 mph). The ship's company consisted of 4 officers and 67 sailors.

The destroyer's main armament consisted of a BL 4-inch Mark VIII gun, supplemented by three QF 12-pounder 12 cwt guns. This was supplemented by three single 18 inch (450 mm) torpedo tubes and three .303-inch machine guns. Later in the ship's career, two depth charge throwers and four depth charge chutes were installed.

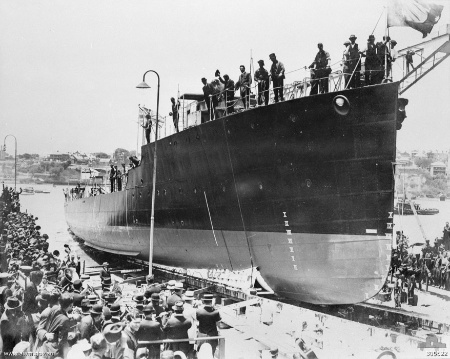
Swan being launched on 11 December 1915

Swan was laid down by the Cockatoo Docks and Engineering Company at Sydney in New South Wales on 22 January 1913. She was launched on 11 December 1915 by the wife of Sir William Rooke Creswell, the First Naval Member of the Australian Commonwealth Naval Board.

The destroyer was commissioned into the RAN on 16 August 1916, six days before construction work concluded. Her name comes from the Swan River in Western Australia.

== Operational history ==
Swan's first operation was with British blockade forces in the Far East, particularly around the Philippines, Celebes, and Malaya. On 2 July 1917, the destroyer sailed for the Mediterranean, meeting all five of her sister ships en route.

The Australian destroyers were based at Brindisi as an anti-submarine force. The patrols were uneventful, and the only action Swan saw was when she was diverted to perform shore bombardments during the Second Battle of Durazzo on 2 October 1918. On 25 October, Swan and Warrego sailed to Port Said to meet a troop transport convoy and their Japanese escort, and accompany them to Salonika. The ship received the battle honour "Adriatic 1917–18" for her wartime service.

After the end of World War I, Swan was assigned to an Allied fleet responsible for taking over Russian anti-Bolshevik naval units as Sebastapol. She then sailed in December with the French destroyer Bisson to report on conditions in the eastern Ukraine, although they reached their destination, an advance by Bolshevik forces caused the cancellation of the mission. Swan sailed to Gibraltar, where she, her sister ships, and the cruiser HMAS Melbourne departed for Australia on 3 January 1919. Swan operated in Australian waters until June 1920, when she was placed in reserve. In 1925, the destroyer was reactivated and sent to Tasmania, where she spent the next two years alternating between operational and reserve status.

== Decommissioning and fate ==
Swan was paid off for the final time at Sydney on 15 May 1928 and sold to Cockatoo Island Dockyard for scrapping in 1930. Swan and sister ship Parramatta were stripped down, and their hulks were sold to New South Wales Penal Department and towed to Cowan Creek, where they were used to house prisoner labourers working on roads along the Hawkesbury River.

Public outcry opposed this use of prison labour, so the two hulks were sold in 1933 for 12 pounds each to George Rhodes of Cowan, New South Wales, who intended to use them as accommodation for fishers. Rhodes' plan did not gain government approval, and the ships were sold on to a pair of fishermen, who used them to transport blue metal to Milson and Peat Islands.

On 2 February 1934, Swan and Parramatta were being towed down the Hawkesbury River for final breaking in Sydney, when gale conditions caused both hulls to break their tows. While Parramatta ran aground, Swan filled with rainwater and capsized at Tumbledown, near Croppy Point and Wobbly Beach.

The exact location of Swan's wreck was forgotten until 1994 When Greig Berry, a researcher/diver from the Central Coast claimed to have found it in 19 metres of water near Little Wobbie public wharf. He in turn was contacted by the DSTO and Berry showed them the site in 1996 and several sonar runs positively identified the remains as Swan. A RAN hydrography team came across the wreck while updating charts in 2001. Diving the wreck is not advised, as while Swan sits in only 20 metres (66 ft) of water, the currents in the area flow at around 4 knots (7.4 km/h; 4.6 mph), and visibility is less than 1 inch (25 mm). The wreck is located in 33°32′55.9″S 151°14′58.8″E.

== Sources ==
- Briggs, Mark (2019). "Australia's First Destroyers". In Jordan, John (ed.). Warship 2019. Oxford, UK: Osprey Publishing. pp. 153–167. ISBN 978-1-4728-3595-6.
- Cassells, Vic (2000). The Destroyers: Their Battles and Their Badges. East Roseville, NSW: Simon & Schuster. ISBN 0-7318-0893-2. OCLC 46829686.
