= HMAS Kuttabul =

One ship and one shore establishment of the Royal Australian Navy (RAN) have been named HMAS Kuttabul.

- HMAS Kuttabul (ship), a former harbour ferry acquired during World War II for use as an accommodation ship. Kuttabul was sunk by torpedo during the 1942 Japanese submarine attack on Sydney Harbour.
- HMAS Kuttabul (naval base), a naval base at Garden Island, New South Wales which was renamed in 1943 in honour of the accommodation ship, is the primary East Coast base of the RAN.
