= Milson Island =

Island in New South Wales, Australia

Coordinates: 33°30′53″S 151°10′46″E

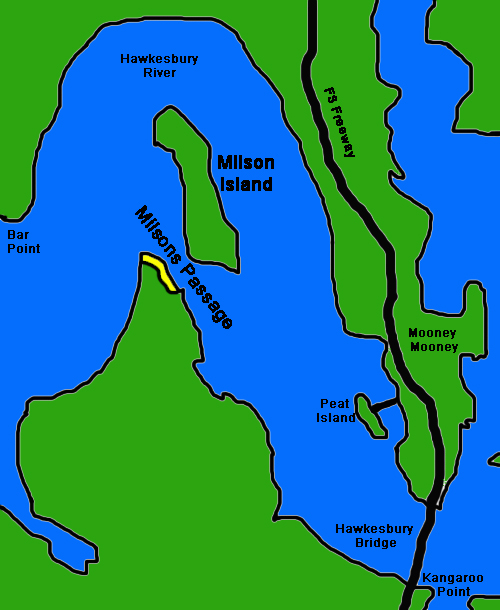
Sketch map of Milsons Passage and Milson Island on the Hawkesbury River. The passage in the Hawkesbury River called Milsons Passage is marked on the map. Milson Island, only accessible by boat or ferry is marked on the map. The suburb by the name of Milsons Passage is marked on the map in yellow. The suburb is only accessible by boat.

Milson Island is an island located on the Hawkesbury River, 40 kilometres (25 mi) north of Sydney, New South Wales, Australia. It is accessible only by boat.

The island was first settled over 100 years ago and has been used as a bacteriological station, quarantine station, a hospital to treat soldiers from World War I with venereal disease, mental hospital, a rehab for alcoholics, a women's jail, and by the 1980s, a sports and recreation centre.

All that is left of the old mental asylum is the nurses' quarters or hospital. When the mental asylum was operating, an alarm system was set up, so that people on the island could keep themselves safe from escapees. The nurses' quarters are now rotted away, but the furnishings from the asylum still remain.

The New South Wales Office of Sport uses the island for camps for schools, sports teams and other groups. Some of the activities available at Milson Island include canoeing, kayaking, fishing, archery, bushwalking, obstacle course and raft building. The accommodation is 3–4 stars with seven lodges and five holiday units. The camp usually suits two small schools or one big school at the same time.

The Sport and Recreation Centre still uses the refurbished sleeping quarters as the dining room and kitchen. The rooms at Milson Island range from school kids' rooms that sleep up to five people to lodges for one to four people.

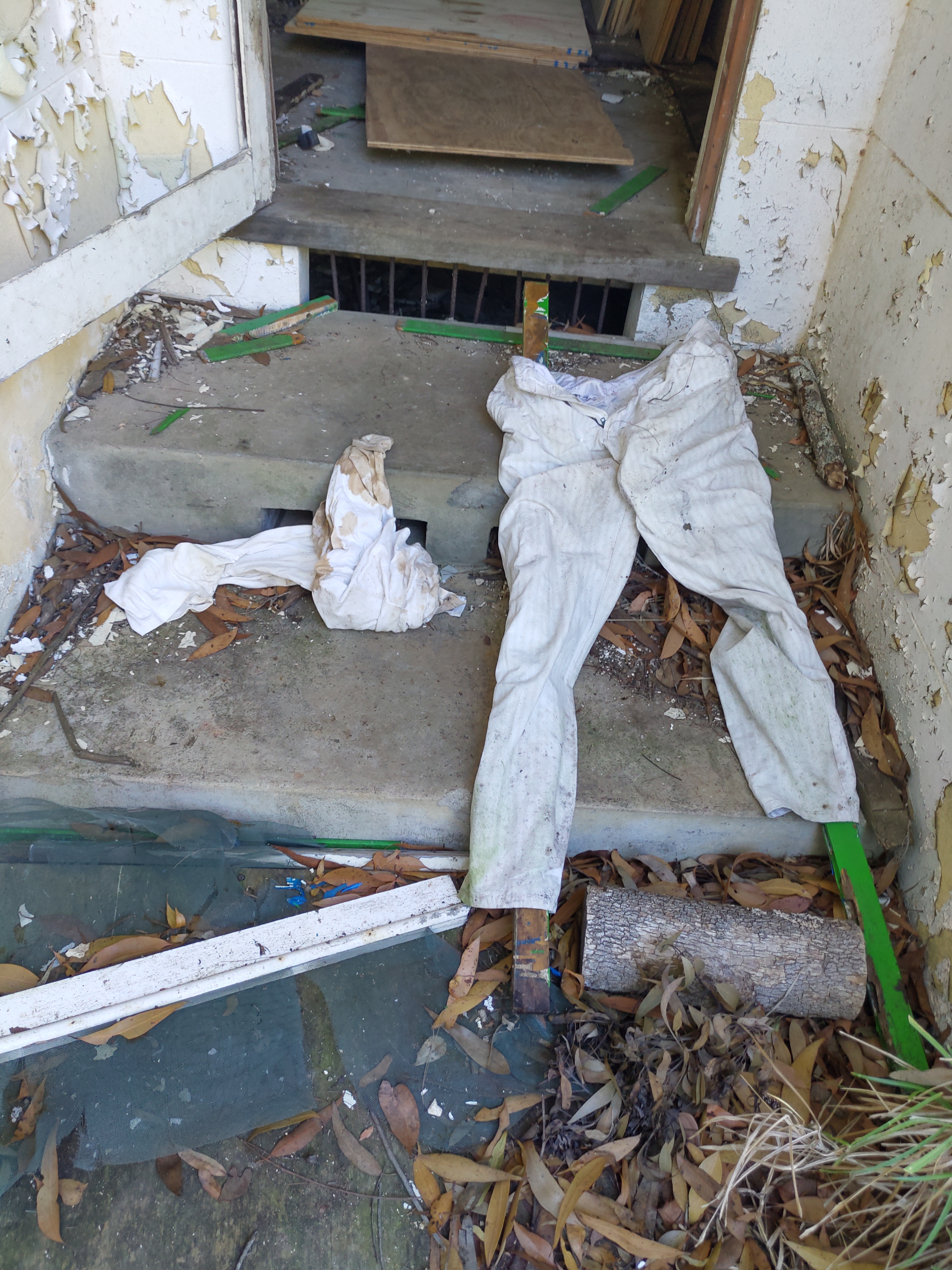
Nurses quarters exterior 2019

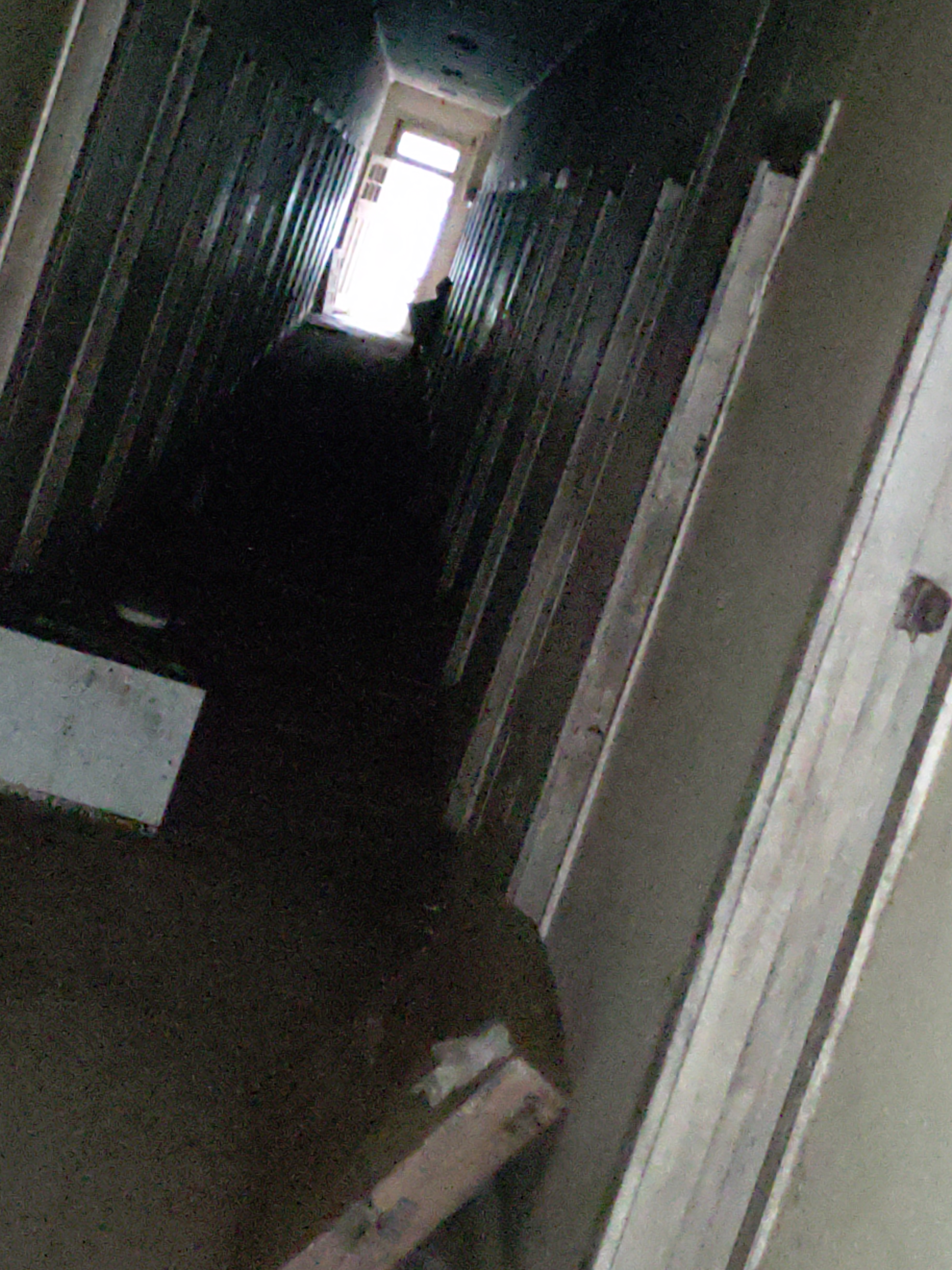
Nurses quarters interior 2019

Milson Island pool

Milson Island high ropes challenge

== See also ==
- Peat Island
