= HMAS Torrens (D67) =

River-class torpedo-boat destroyer of the Royal Australian Navy

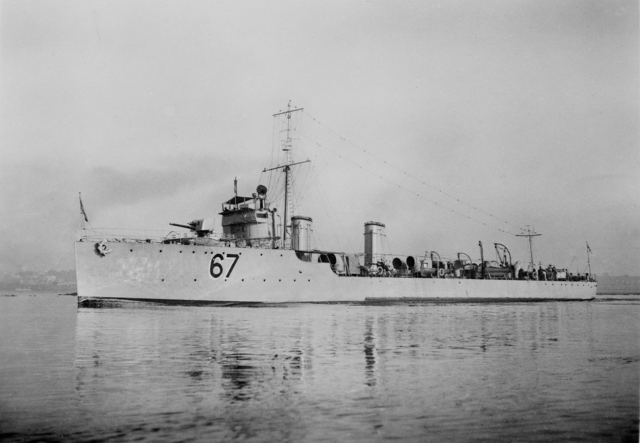
- HMAS Torrens

History

Australia
- Namesake: The River Torrens
- Builder: Cockatoo Docks and Engineering Company
- Laid down: 25 January 1913
- Launched: 28 August 1915
- Commissioned: 3 July 1916
- Decommissioned: 19 July 1920 (to reserve)
- Reclassified: Training ship (1920–1925)
- Honours and awards: Battle honour: Adriatic 1917–18
- Fate: Sunk as target 24 November 1930

General characteristics
- Class & type: River-class torpedo-boat destroyer
- Displacement: 750 tons
- Length: 250 ft 9 in (76.43 m) length overall; 243 ft (74 m) between perpendiculars
- Beam: 24 ft 3.625 in (7.40728 m)
- Propulsion: 3 × Yarrow boilers, Parsons turbines, 10,000 shp (7,500 kW), 3 shafts
- Speed: 26 knots (48 km/h; 30 mph)
- Range: 2,690 nautical miles (4,980 km; 3,100 mi) at 11.5 knots (21.3 km/h; 13.2 mph)
- Complement: 5 officers, 67 sailors
- Armament: 1 × BL 4-inch Mk VIII gun; 3 × QF 12-pounder 12 cwt naval guns; 3 × .303-inch machine guns; 3 × 18-inch (450mm) torpedo tubes; Depth charge chutes and throwers (installed later)

HMAS Torrens, named for the River Torrens, was a River-class torpedo-boat destroyer of the Royal Australian Navy (RAN). The destroyer was built at Cockatoo Island Dockyard and entered service with the RAN in 1916. The destroyer was first deployed to East Asia, then the Mediterranean, where she remained for the rest of World War I. After returning to Australia, the destroyer was decommissioned, but saw use in several ports for reservist training before the decision to sell her for scrap was made. After being stripped, the destroyer was towed outside Sydney Heads, used for gunnery practice, and scuttled.

== Design and construction ==
Torrens was one of six River-class torpedo-boat destroyers built for the RAN. The destroyer had a displacement of 750 tons, was 250 feet 9 inches (76.43 m) long overall and 245 feet (75 m) long between perpendiculars, and had a beam of 24 feet 3.625 inches (7.40728 m). Propulsion machinery consisted of three Yarrow boilers feeding Parsons turbines, which supplied 10,000 shaft horsepower (7,500 kW) to the ship's three propeller shafts. Its maximum speed was 26 knots (48 km/h; 30 mph), and maximum range was 2,690 nautical miles (4,980 km; 3,100 mi) at 11.5 knots (21.3 km/h; 13.2 mph). The ship's company consisted of 5 officers and 68 sailors.

The destroyer's main armament consisted of a BL 4-inch Mark VIII gun, and three QF 12-pounder 12 cwt guns. This was supplemented by three single 18-inch torpedo tubes and three .303-inch machine guns. Later in the ship's career, two depth charge throwers and four depth charge chutes were installed.

Torrens was laid down by Cockatoo Docks and Engineering Company at Cockatoo Island, New South Wales on 25 January 1913. She was launched on 28 August 1915 by the wife of Lord Munro Ferguson, the Governor-General of Australia. The destroyer was commissioned into the RAN on 3 July 1916, twelve days before construction completed. The ship's name comes from the River Torrens in South Australia.

== Operational history ==
Torrens and sister ship Swan were first assigned to the British Far East Patrol. From September 1916 to May 1917, Torrens operated throughout Maritime Southeast Asia. In June, the destroyer docked at Singapore for a refit. after which Torrens and the other five River class vessels sailed for the Mediterranean.

Torrens began her Mediterranean assignment by escorting a convoy from Port Said to Malta, where she underwent and refits. She then relocated to Brindisi as part of the anti-submarine patrol force. The heavy but monotonous workload forced the destroyer to visit Malta in December for another refit.

On the night of 22–23 April 1919, Torrens was one of six Allied ships patrolling the Adriatic. A force of five Austrian destroyers attacked, seriously damaging the British destroyers Hornet and Jackal before retreating faster than the Allied ships could pursue.

Apart from a brief refit at Messina in September–October, Torrens remained in the region until the end of World War I. Her wartime service was later recognised with the battle honour "Adriatic 1917–18". After returning to Australia in May 1919, Torrens was involved in routine duties.

== Decommissioning and fate ==
Torrens was paid off into reserve on 19 July 1920. The destroyer was relocated to Flinders Naval Depot in July 1924, and although not recommissioned, was used for the training of naval reservists. Torrens was later transferred to Port Adelaide, where she was again used for training until March 1925. The ship returned to Sydney on 11 May, with occasional use for reservist training.

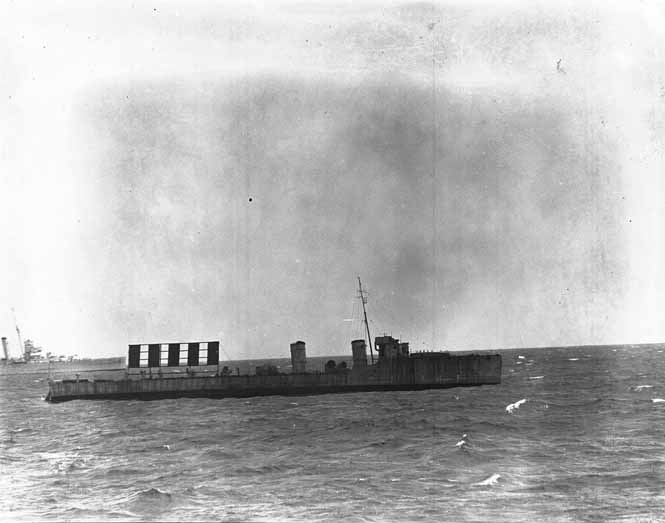
Torrens shortly before being sunk as a target in 1930

During the general reduction in naval activity imposed by lack of finance during the Great Depression, it was decided to scrap Torrens and her five sister ships.

On 24 November 1930, after being stripped of useful materials, Torrens was towed outside Sydney Heads by the tug Heroic, and was used for gunnery target practice. The destroyer withstood considerable shelling before being scuttled by a charge of gelignite. The wreck lies off Sydney in position 33°53′54″S 151°39′54″E.
