= HMAS Melbourne (1912) =

Town-class light cruiser of Royal Australian Navy

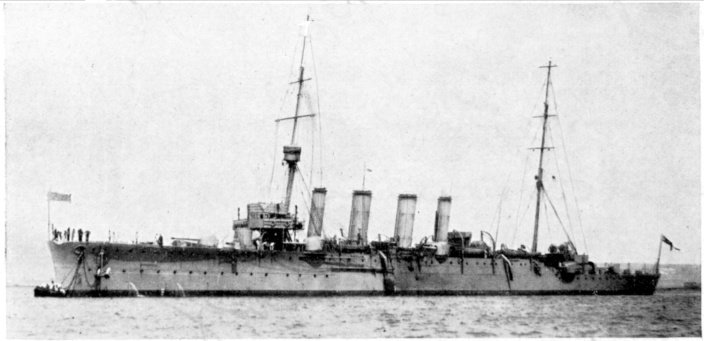
- HMAS Melbourne

History

Australia
- Name: Melbourne
- Namesake: City of Melbourne
- Builder: Cammell Laird & Co Ltd
- Laid down: 4 April 1911
- Launched: 30 May 1912
- Commissioned: 18 January 1913
- Decommissioned: 23 April 1928
- Motto: "Viries Acquiret Eundo"
- Honours and awards: Battle honours: Rabaul 1914; North Sea 1916–18
- Fate: Sold for scrap in 1929

General characteristics
- Class & type: Town class cruiser
- Displacement: 5,400 long tons (5,500 t)
- Length: 456 ft 10 3/8 in (139.252 m) length overall; 430 ft (130 m) between perpendiculars
- Beam: 49 ft 10 in (15.19 m)
- Draught: 19 ft 7 in (5.97 m) maximum; 15.75 ft (4.80 m) mean
- Propulsion: Parsons turbines, Yarrow boilers, 25,000 shp (19,000 kW), 4 screws
- Speed: 25.7 knots (47.6 km/h; 29.6 mph)
- Complement: 13 officers, 454 sailors
- Armament: 8 × BL 6-inch (152.4 mm) Mk XI* 50 calibre guns; 1 × QF 3-inch anti-aircraft gun; 1 × 76 mm (3.0 in) field gun; 2 × .303-inch Maxim guns; 2 × 21 inch (533 mm) torpedo tubes; 4 × 3-pounder saluting guns

HMAS Melbourne was a Town class light cruiser operated by the Royal Australian Navy (RAN). The ship was laid down by Cammell Laird at Birkenhead in England in 1911, launched in 1912 and commissioned in 1913. At the start of World War I, Melbourne was involved in attempts to locate the German East Asia Squadron, and participated in the capture of German colonies in the Pacific, before being assigned to the North America and West Indies Stations. In 1916, the cruiser joined the Grand Fleet in the North Sea, where she remained for the remainder of the war. Melbourne spent late 1919 and early 1920 in reserve, then was flagship of the Royal Australian Navy from 1920 until 1928, except for a second period in reserve during 1924 and 1925. HMAS Melbourne paid off in the United Kingdom on 23 April 1928, and was scrapped in 1929.

== Design and construction ==
Melbourne was a Town class light cruiser. The ship had a standard displacement of 5,400 tons, was 456 feet 10 3/8 inches (139.252 m) long overall and 430 feet (130 m) long between perpendiculars, had a beam of 49 feet 10 inches (15.19 m), a maximum draught of 19 feet 7 inches (5.97 m), and a mean draught of 15.75 feet (4.80 m). The propulsion machinery consisted of Yarrow boilers feeding Parsons steam turbines, which supplied 25,000 shaft horsepower to the ship's four propellers. Although only designed to reach 25 knots (46 km/h; 29 mph), Melbourne was capable of sailing at 25.7 knots (47.6 km/h; 29.6 mph). The ship's company consisted of 485: 31 officers, and 484 sailors.

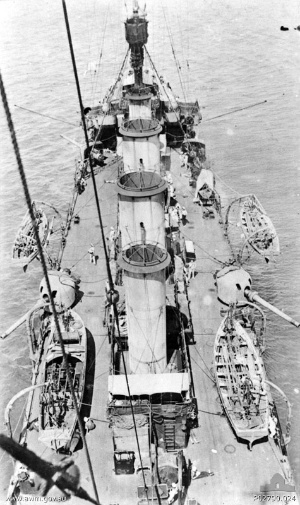
Looking aft from top of foremast, showing four 6-inch guns

The cruiser's main armament consisted of eight BL 6-inch (152.4 mm) Mk XI* 50 calibre guns. This was supplemented by a single QF 3-inch anti-aircraft gun, two .303-inch Maxim guns, and two 21-inch (533 mm) torpedo tubes (with seven torpedoes carried). A single QF 12-pounder 8 cwt gun field gun, four QF 3-pounder Hotchkiss saluting guns were also carried. Armour plating consisted of side belts 3-inch (76 mm) thick amidships, tapering to 1.5-inch (38 mm) thick at the bow and stern, along with protective decking over the engineering and magazine spaces, and an armoured conning tower.

The ship was laid down by Cammell Laird at Birkenhead in England on 4 April 1911. She was launched on 30 May 1912 by Mrs. F. F. Braund, daughter of Australian philanthropist Robert Barr Smith. Construction was completed on 18 January 1913, the same day Melbourne was commissioned into the RAN. She was the first cruiser launched for the RAN, and the first completed. The ship cost 405,000 pounds to build.

== Operational history ==
On completion, Melbourne sailed from Portsmouth for Australia, arriving in Fremantle on 10 March 1913. Until August 1914, the cruiser was primarily involved in training cruises and port visits around Australia. During August and September, the cruiser operated with other Australian warships in the Pacific as a counter to the German East Asia Squadron, and was involved in the capture of several German colonies. Melbourne returned to Sydney on 20 September, and on 1 November joined the escort of the convoy transporting the Australian and New Zealand Army Corps to Egypt. The cruiser left the convoy while in the Indian Ocean, and headed for Gibraltar, where she was then instructed to head for the Azores in search of the German cruiser SMS Karlsruhe.

By the time she reached the Azores on 12 December, Melbourne had been reassigned to Bermuda as part of the North America and West Indies Station. While on the Station, the cruiser patrolled the western Atlantic from Canada to Brazil. In August 1916, she sailed for Devonport in England, where she spent a month before joining the 2nd Light Cruiser Squadron of the British Grand Fleet, stationed at Scapa Flow. From January until June 1917, Melbourne was docked at Birkenhead for major repairs to her propulsion system. The cruiser was fitted with an aeroplane platform in November 1917. On 1 June 1918, Melbourne launched her aircraft after sighting German aircraft over Heligoland Bight, but the pilot lost his target in the clouds. At the surrender of the German High Seas Fleet, Melbourne was assigned to escort SMS Nürnberg. The cruiser remained with the Grand Fleet until 30 November 1918: during the entire war, Melbourne was not involved in any sea battles. Initially, the cruiser was not awarded any battle honours, but a reorganisation of the RAN honours system published in 2010 retroactively awarded the honours "Rabaul 1914" and "North Sea 1916–18" to the ship.

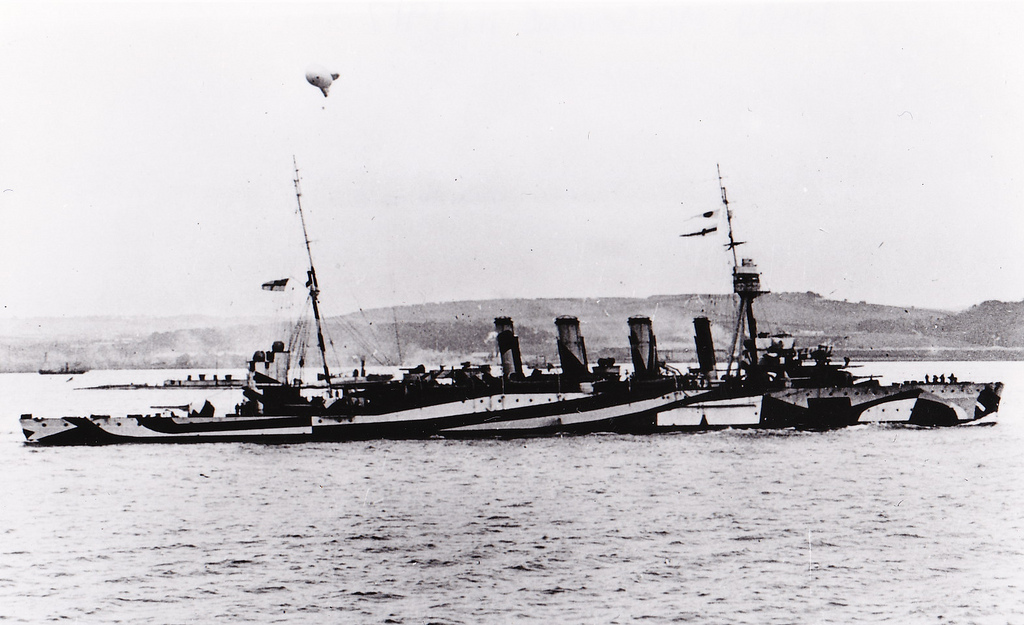
Melbourne in dazzle camouflage in 1918. Melbourne was the only ship of the RAN to be painted in dazzle camouflage during World War I.

Melbourne stayed in Portsmouth until 7 March 1919, then sailed for Sydney via Suez, Singapore, and Darwin. The ship was paid off into reserve on 5 August 1919 until 14 April 1920, when she was recommissioned. In 1922, the ship rescued personnel from the sailing vessel Helen B. Sterling, which had been disabled in the Tasman Sea by a gale. Also in 1922, the ship was assigned as Flagship of the Australian Squadron. She was returned to reserve on 29 September 1924; most of the four years in service had been spent in Australian waters, with cruises to New Zealand and the Pacific Islands. The cruiser was recommissioned on 8 October 1925, and left Sydney for England on 23 November. During 1926, the ship was assigned to the Mediterranean Fleet on exchange, with the British cruiser HMS Delhi sent to operate with the RAN. Melbourne returned in August 1926, and resumed duties as Flagship.

== Fate ==
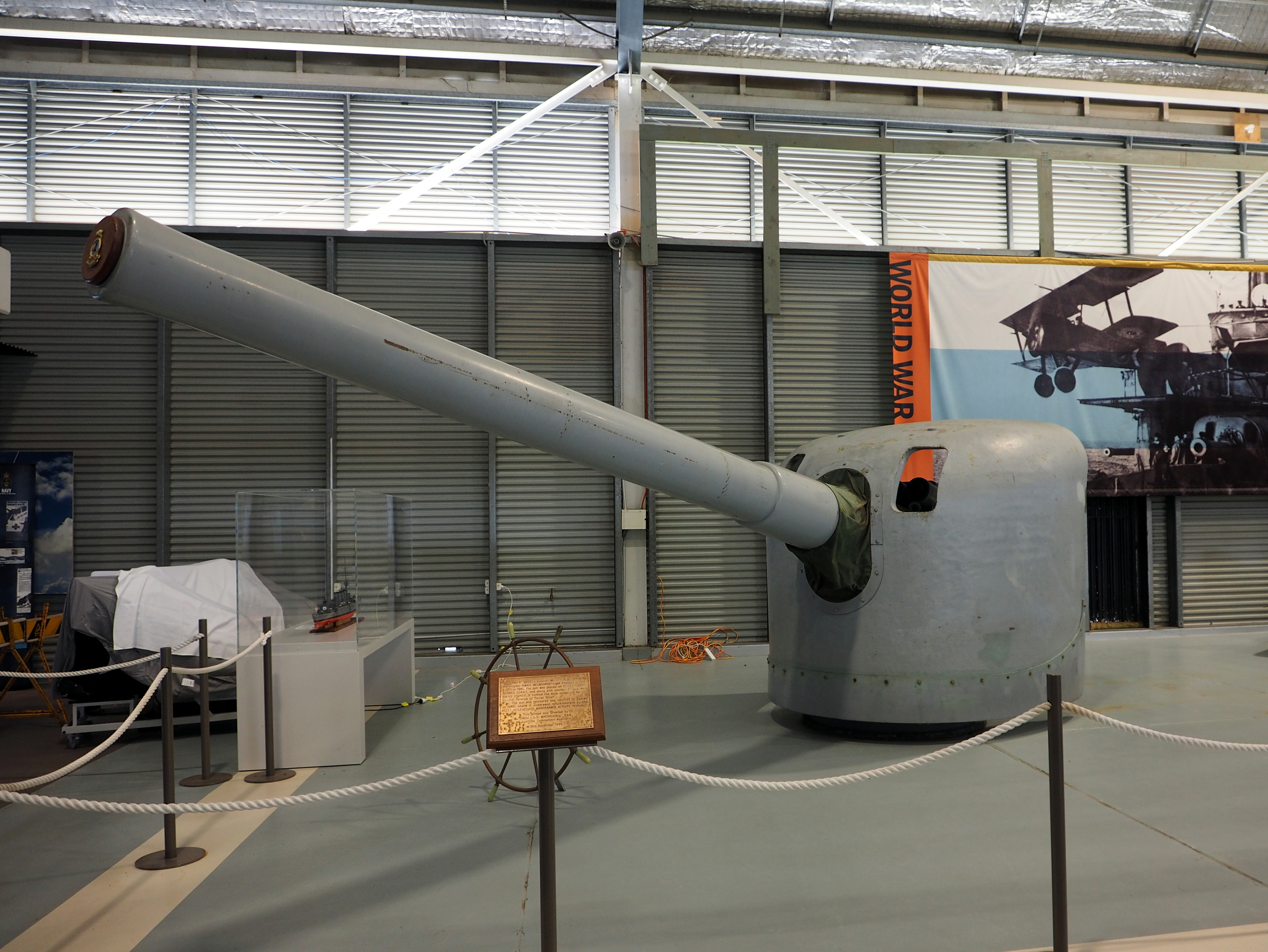
One of HMAS Melbourne's 6-inch guns on display at the Fleet Air Arm Museum in 2015

On 9 February 1928, Melbourne commenced her last voyage to England, where she arrived on 12 April. Melbourne was decommissioned for the final time on 23 April, with her ship's company assigned to the new heavy cruiser HMAS Australia. The ship was sold to the Alloa Shipbreaking Company on 8 December for 25,000 pounds. The cruiser was transported to Birkenhead, and was broken up over the course of 1929.
