= HMAS Yarra (D79) =

River-class torpedo-boat destroyer of the Royal Australian Navy

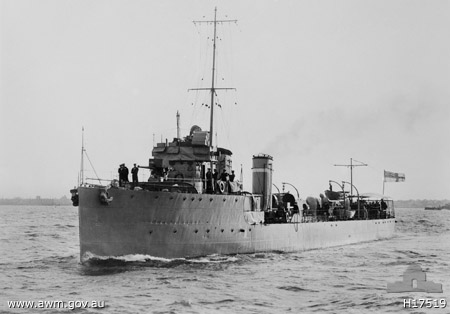
- HMAS Yarra

History

Australia
- Namesake: Yarra River
- Builder: William Denny and Brothers
- Laid down: 1909
- Launched: 9 April 1910
- Commissioned: 1 March 1911
- Decommissioned: 10 May 1928
- Honours and awards: Battle honours: Rabaul 1914; Adriatic 1917–18
- Fate: Sunk as target in 22 August 1932
- Badge

General characteristics
- Class & type: River-class torpedo-boat destroyer
- Displacement: 700 tons
- Length: 245.75 ft (74.90 m) length overall
- Beam: 24 ft 3.5 in (7.404 m)
- Draught: 8 ft 10 in (2.69 m)
- Propulsion: 3 × Yarrow boilers, Parsons turbines, 10,000 shp (7,500 kW), 3 shafts
- Speed: 26 knots (48 km/h; 30 mph)
- Range: 2,690 nautical miles (4,980 km; 3,100 mi) at 11.5 knots (21.3 km/h; 13.2 mph)
- Complement: 5 officers, 68 sailors
- Armament: 1 × BL 4-inch Mk VIII gun; 3 × QF 12-pounder 12 cwt naval guns; 3 × .303-inch machine guns; 3 × 18-inch torpedo tubes (later reduced to 2); Depth charge chutes and throwers (installed later)

HMAS Yarra, named for the Yarra River, was a River-class torpedo-boat destroyer of the Royal Australian Navy (RAN). Ordered in 1909 for the Commonwealth Naval Forces (the predecessor of the RAN), Yarra was temporarily commissioned into the Royal Navy on completion in 1910 and handed over to Australian control on arrival in Australia.

From 1914 to 1917, Yarra was involved in wartime patrols in the Pacific and South East Asian regions, before she and her sister ships were transferred to the Mediterranean for anti-submarine operations. She returned to Australia in 1919 and was used primarily to train naval reservists. Decommissioned into reserve then reactivated on five occasions between 1919 and 1928, Yarra was paid off for the final time in 1928, was taken to Cockatoo Island Dockyard for stripping, then was sunk in 1932 as a target ship.

== Design and construction ==
Yarra had a displacement of 700 tons, a length overall of 245.75 feet (74.90 m), beam of 24 feet 3.5 inches (7.404 m), and a maximum draught of 8 feet 10 inches (2.69 m). The destroyer was powered by three Yarrow oil-burning boilers connected to Parsons turbines, which delivered 10,000 shaft horsepower to three propeller shafts. Yarra's designed maximum speed was 26 knots (48 km/h; 30 mph) (although she achieved a full knot higher during full-speed trials), and she had a cruising speed of 11.5 knots (21.3 km/h; 13.2 mph), giving the ship a range of 2,690 nautical miles (4,980 km; 3,100 mi). The ship's company consisted of five officers and 68 sailors.

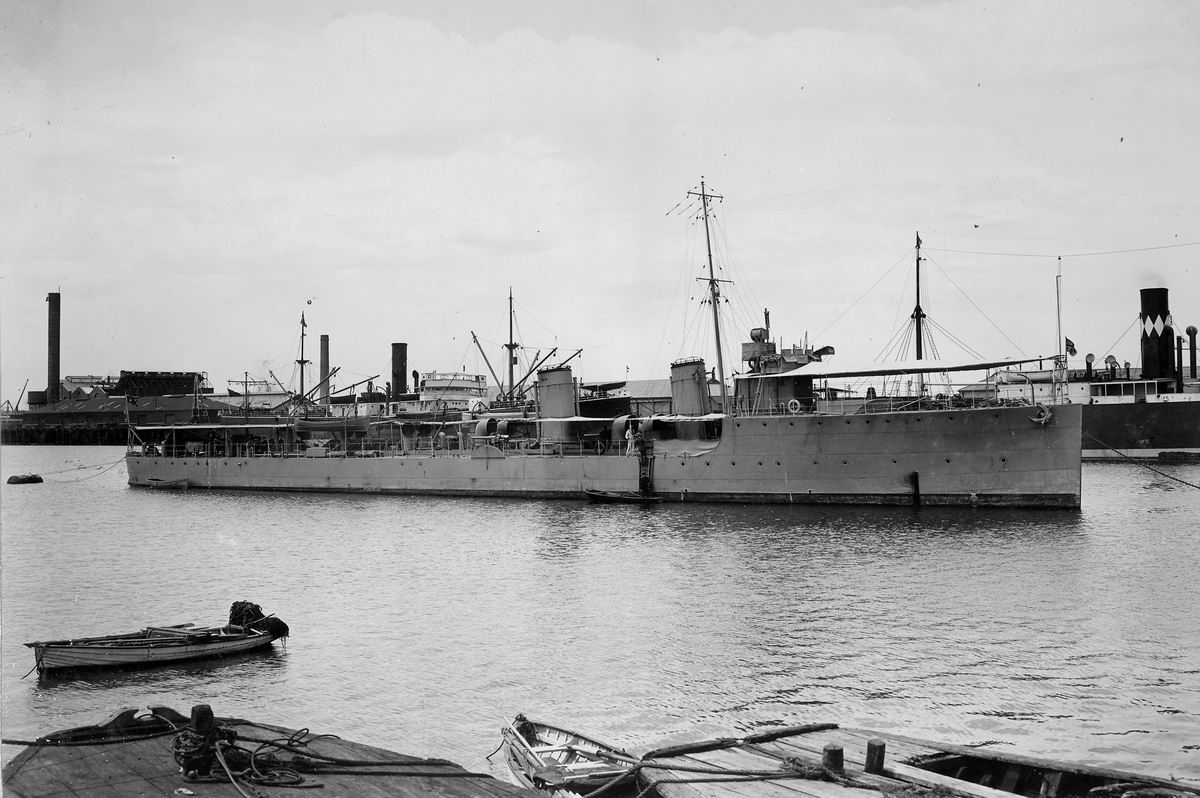
Yarra anchored in Port Adelaide in December 1910, shortly after arriving in Australian waters

The destroyer's main armament consisted of a single BL 4-inch Mark VIII naval gun, supplemented by three QF 12-pounder 12 cwt naval guns. She was also fitted with three .303-inch machine guns and three single 18-inch torpedo tubes. Later in Yarra's career, the destroyer was fitted with four chutes and two throwers for depth charges, and one of the torpedo tubes was removed.

Yarra, along with sister ships Parramatta and Warrego, were ordered on 6 February 1909; the first ships to be ordered for the Commonwealth Naval Forces, the post-Federation amalgamation of the Australian colonial navies. Yarra was laid down by William Denny and Brothers, at their shipyard in Dumbarton. She was launched on 9 April 1910 by the wife of Newton Moore, the Premier of Western Australia. Construction was completed in August 1910, and the ship was commissioned into the Royal Navy as HMS Yarra on 10 September 1910 for the voyage out to Australia. Yarra and Parramatta sailed from Portsmouth on 19 September. Once the ships arrived in Broome, they were transferred to the control of the Commonwealth Naval Forces. The destroyer's name comes from the Yarra River in Victoria.

== Operational history ==
During the early stages of World War I, Parramatta operated with the Australian fleet in the search for the German East Asia Squadron, then was involved in the capture of German colonies in the South Pacific region, including German New Guinea, and the consolidation of Allied occupation in these regions. On 5 February 1915, Yarra, Parramatta, and HMAS Warrego sailed for Australia, where they were used for convoy escort duties along the continent's eastern coast until August. The ships were refitted at Sydney, then sent to patrol the Far East. Yarra returned to Australia on 8 May 1916, and patrolled home waters until May 1917, when she and her sister ships were ordered to Malta.

The Australian vessels underwent anti-submarine training, then were deployed to Brindisi for anti-submarine patrols of the Adriatic. On 17 October 1918, Yarra was assigned to the Black Sea, before sailing to England at the start of 1919. The ship earned two battle honours for her wartime service: "Rabaul 1914" and "Adriatic 1917–18".

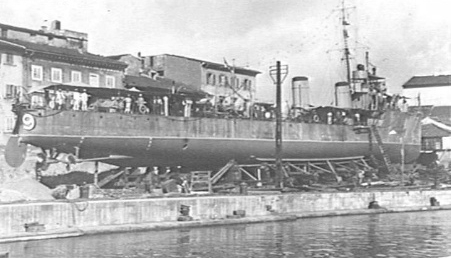
Yarra undergoing a drydocking at Livorno in 1917

On 6 March 1919, Yarra sailed for home, in company with several other Australian ships. Yarra and Parramatta ran out of fuel on 26 April, less than a day out from Darwin, and had to be towed into port by Warrego. The destroyer was placed into reserve then recommission on five occasions between 1919 and 1928, with most of her operations facilitating the training of naval reservists.

== Decommissioning and fate ==
On 30 September 1929 Yarra was sent to Cockatoo Island Dockyard for stripping of reusable fittings in preparation for disposal. After this was completed, on 22 August 1932 the hulk was towed to sea and sunk as a target off Sydney (34°00′S 151°36′E), or scuttled off Sydney Heads on 11 June 1931.
