= River Wharf railway station =

Former railway station in New South Wales, Australia

River Wharf
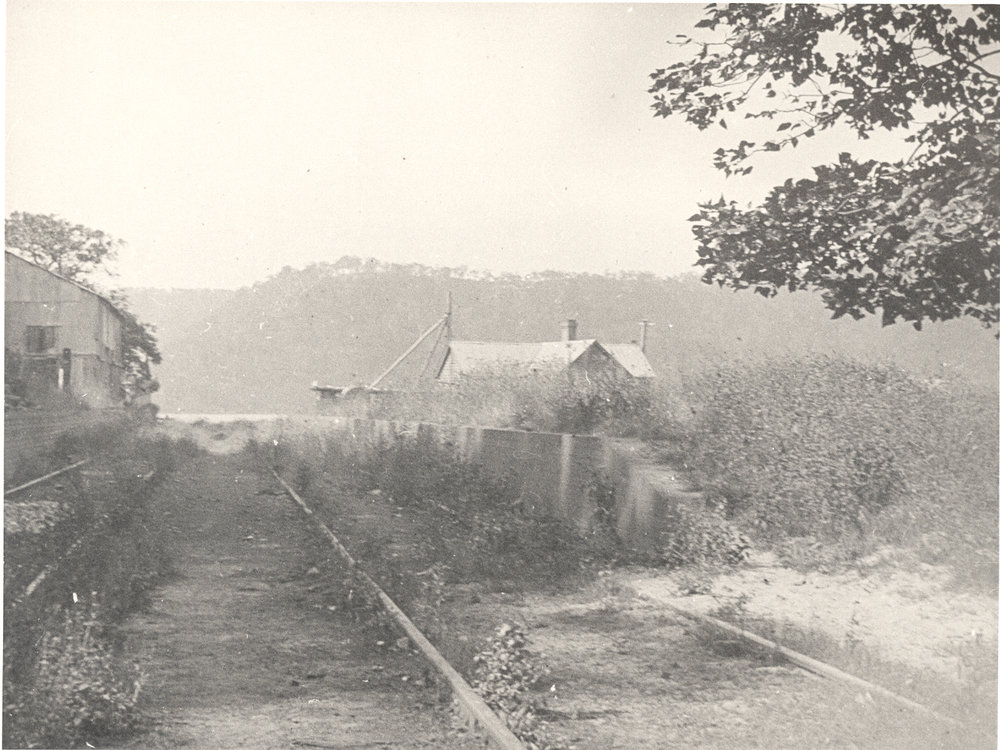
- The disused platforms in 1953

General information
- Location: Long Island, New South Wales; Australia
- Coordinates: 33°32′25″S 151°13′50″E
- Operator: New South Wales Government Railways
- Line: Main North
- Distance: 58.403 km (36.290 mi) from Central
- Platforms: 2 (2 side)
- Tracks: 2

Construction
- Structure type: Ground

Other information
- Status: Disused

History
- Opened: 15 August 1887
- Closed: 1920

Services
Preceding station	Former services	Following station
Terminus	Main Northern Line	Hawkesbury River towards Sydney
Location

River Wharf railway station was a railway station on the Main North railway line, serving the wharves located on Long Island, New South Wales. It was a short-lived station, only serving main line passengers between 1887 and 1889 as the temporary terminus of the line until the opening of the first Hawkesbury River railway bridge, although continued to serve occasional traffic until 1920.

== History ==
River Wharf station was opened on 15 August 1887, and was the terminus for passenger services from Sydney, with a paddle steamer The General Gordon transferring passengers to provide a connection between the two isolated portions of the Main North line.

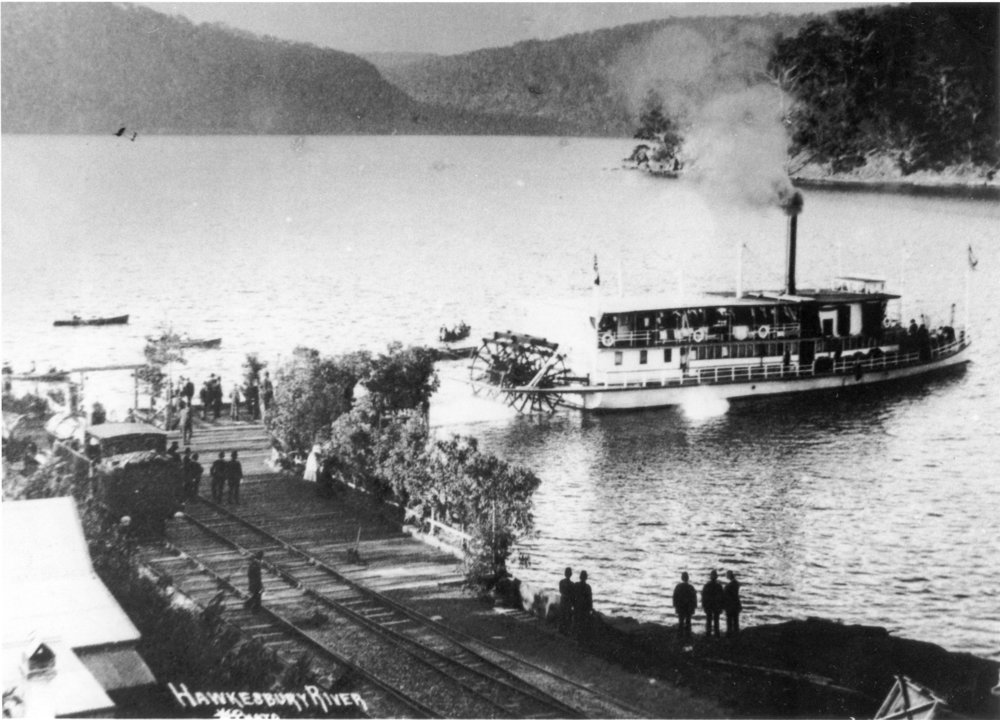
The siding and wharf located past the station platforms, both still in use

This service originally transported passengers from River Wharf to Gosford, until the Woy Woy Tunnel opened in January 1888 from where passengers were transported to a dead end siding at Mullet Creek.

It ceased to be used for passenger services on 1 May 1889 with the opening of the first Hawkesbury River railway bridge, it was referred to as Long Island railway siding and continued to be used for wharf traffic until 1920, when a new wharf near Hawkesbury River was built. The new wharf provided more efficient service, as the approach to the older River Wharf station and wharf had been in need of improvement for nearly thirty years, leading to the complete closure of River Wharf.

== Description ==
The station consisted of two brick passenger side platforms about 80 metres in length, with substantial station buildings and amenities, connecting to a wharf for The General Gordon. General passenger traffic made use of only one of the station's platforms, with the other platform generally handling goods services as no loading bank existed. There were two railway tracks through the station, extending past the platforms to a siding. All platform buildings are no longer extant, but one platform remains.
