= Dangar Island =

- Suburb
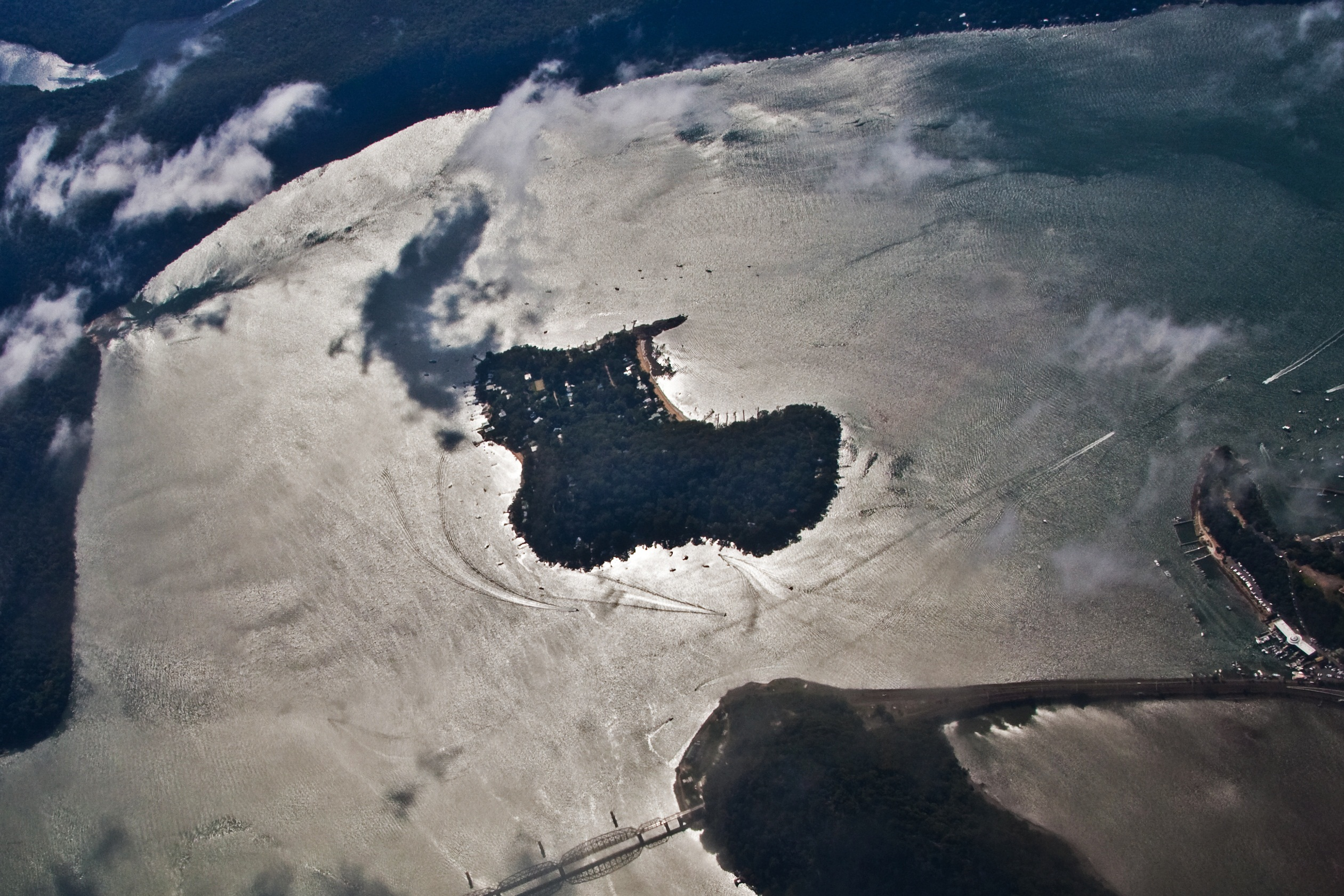

- Flag

- Interactive map of Dangar Island
- Country: Australia
- State: New South Wales
- City: Sydney
- LGA: Hornsby Shire
- Location: 50 km (31 mi) from Sydney CBD

Government
  - State electorate: Hornsby
  - Federal division: Berowra

Area
  - Total: 0.29 km^{2} (0.11 sq mi)

Population
  - Total: 313 (SAL 2021)
  - Density: 920.7/km^{2} (2,385/sq mi)
- Postcode: 2083
Suburbs around Dangar Island
| Brisbane Water National Park | Brisbane Water National Park | Brisbane Water National Park |
| Wisemans Ferry | Dangar Island | Patonga |
| Brooklyn | Pittwater | Palm Beach |

Dangar Island is a forested island, 30.8 hectares (76 acres) in area, in the Hawkesbury River, on the northern outskirts of Sydney, New South Wales, Australia. Dangar Island is a suburb of Hornsby Shire, and as of the 2021 census, has a population of 313, which swells dramatically during holiday seasons. The island is serviced regularly by Brooklyn Ferry Service and departs from Brooklyn and takes about fifteen minutes. The Brooklyn ferry is itself adjacent to Hawkesbury River railway station. The ferry service is in operation seven days a week.

== History ==
Dangar Island has been known to the local Guringai Aboriginal nation for thousands of years. The first European to visit the area was Governor Arthur Phillip, who explored the lower river by small boat in March 1788, within weeks of the First Fleet's arrival. He named it Mullet Island, for the abundance of fish in the local Hawkesbury River. At first, the local people were friendly towards him, but when he returned a year later, they would not come into contact. By 1790, over half the Guringai people had succumbed to the smallpox the British had brought with them.

The island was purchased in 1864 and renamed by Henry Cary Dangar, the son of Henry Dangar, a surveyor, pastoralist and parliamentarian.

Dangar leased the island to the Union Bridge Company of Chicago for the construction of the original Hawkesbury River Rail Bridge between 1886 and 1889. About 300 workers and their families lived there and the island boasted a large social hall, school, library and its own newspaper.

A large building known as the Marine Hotel was built around 1890. In 1892-93, it offered "First Class refreshments at Sydney prices. Bathing, Fishing, Oystering, Tennis Courts, Skittle Alley, etc.". Visitors reached the island by train and ferry, or by steamer. Most of the building was destroyed by fire in 1939, but a separate section of the hotel called The Pavilion survived the fire and is now a private residence.

In the 1920s the island was divided into residential plots, though space was reserved on the beach, the flat and the top of the hill for recreational use. Dangar Island Post Office opened on 1 September 1951 and closed in 1986.

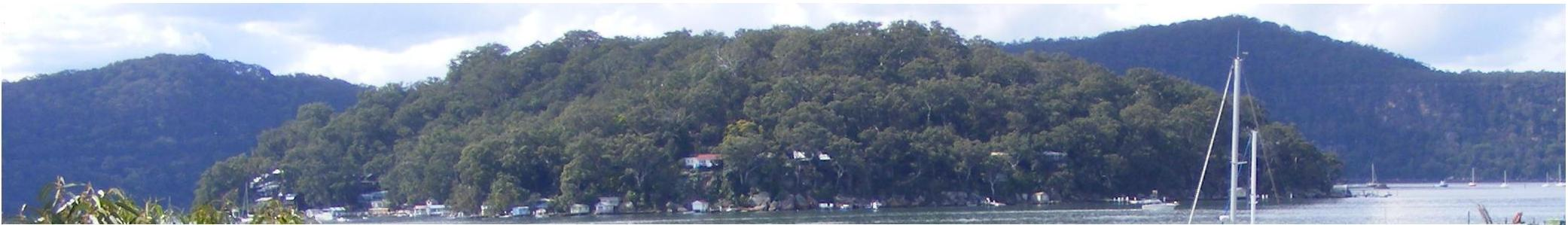
Dangar Island

== Population ==
Per the 2021 census, 313 people live on Dangar Island. 63.3% of residents were born in Australia, with the next most common countries of birth being England at 13.7%, New Zealand at 5.1%, the United States of America at 4.2%, Germany at 1.6% and the Netherlands at 1.6%. 90.4% of people speak only English at home, followed by Spanish at 1.9%, Mandarin at 1.6% and French at 1.0%. The most common response for religion was No Religion at 65.2%, followed by Anglican at 8.6%, Catholic at 6.7% and Buddhism at 3.2%.

== About the island ==
Flag

In contrast to much of the surrounding area, which is designated national park, Dangar Island is relatively heavily inhabited. The island has several tarmacked roads which are closed off to all but the community fire truck, the council ute and vehicles with special permits. There are no private cars on the island. A wheelbarrow is a common method used to haul goods from the ferry. The island has one shop/café, and a bowling club for members and visitors which has a bar. The island also has a community hall that supports several community groups, including a singing group, bridge club, yoga sessions, a children's jazz group, curated film screenings, and a children's film workshop.

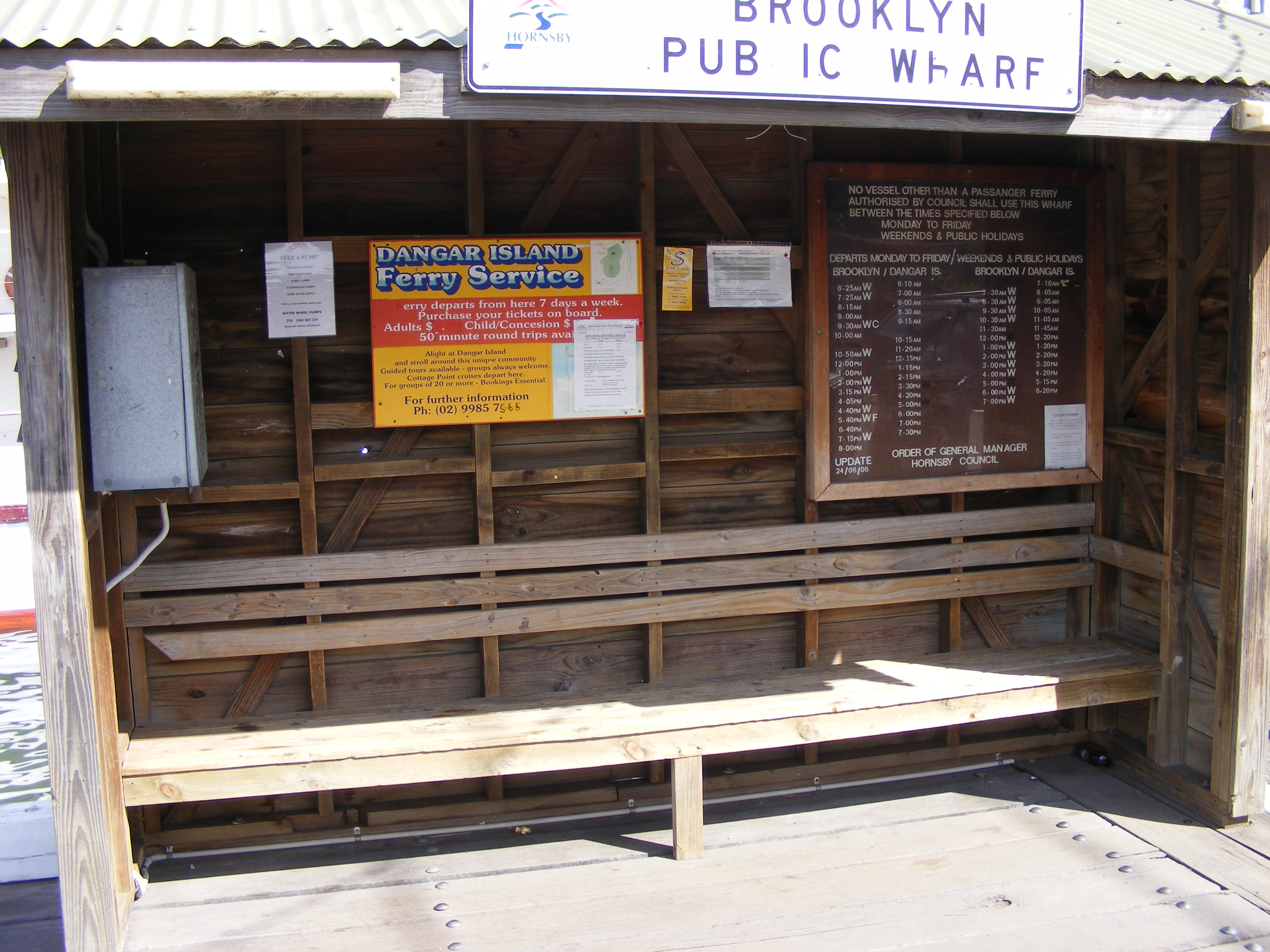
The Brooklyn ferry wharf to Dangar Island

The island was connected to the water supply system by the then Metropolitan Water Sewerage and Drainage Board in 1971. The island has since been connected to the Sydney sewerage system by Sydney Water using a pipeline to the mainland. Septic tanks are quickly being phased out by most residents, providing a boost to the Hawkesbury waterways surrounding Dangar Island. Mail is delivered to the island daily by Australia's last Riverboat Postman.

The island has a shop next to the ferry wharf that serves light snacks, coffee, breakfast and lunch. It also sells groceries and has a good supply of meat. On the weekend, the Dangar Island Bowling Club, which is licensed, serves meals and hosts games of bowls.

== Island access ==
Travelling by road from the south, from either Sydney or Hornsby, access is available via the M1 motorway. Travellers can drive across the Hawkesbury River Bridge at Kangaroo Point, and follow the Brooklyn-Mooney Mooney turnoff just after the river crossing. Travelling by road from the north, from either Newcastle or Gosford, access is available via the M1 motorway. On approaching the Hawkesbury River, the motorway exit is along the Brooklyn-Mooney Mooney turnoff on the left hand side. The route continues through Brooklyn village, terminating at a public car park adjacent to the Dangar Island Ferry Wharf.

Rail travellers can catch any all-stations train on the Central Coast & Newcastle line. If travelling from Central (Sydney), the train departs from the Intercity section (Platforms 1–15). Alight at Hawkesbury River Railway Station (after Cowan railway station). Access to and from the station platforms is available through lifts. The Dangar Island ferry can be seen on the left leaving the station.

== See also ==
- Scotland Island
- Little Wobby
- Ann Howard (author)
- Joe Valli
