= Brooklyn, New South Wales =

Brooklyn
- Suburb
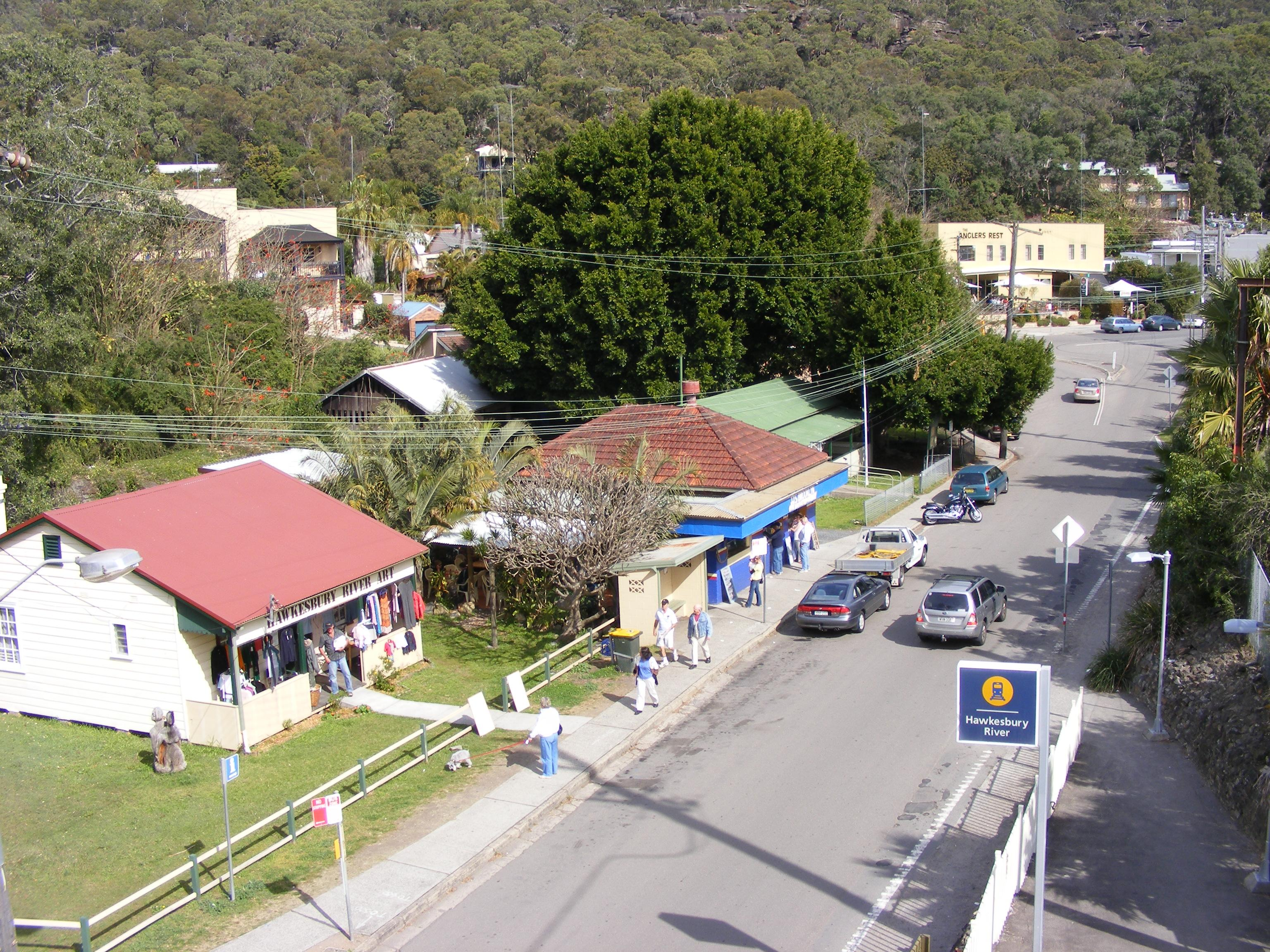
- Main street of Brooklyn in 2007

- Interactive map of Brooklyn
- Coordinates: 33°32′54″S 151°13′4″E
- Country: Australia
- State: New South Wales
- City: Sydney
- LGA: Hornsby Shire
- Location: 48 km (30 mi) north of Sydney CBD; 33 km (21 mi) south of Gosford

Government
  - State electorate: Hornsby
  - Federal division: Berowra

Area^{Note1}
  - Total: 8.7 km^{2} (3.4 sq mi)
- Elevation: 10 m (33 ft)

Population
  - Total: 737 (SAL 2021)
  - Density: 85.5/km^{2} (221/sq mi)
- Time zone: UTC+10 (AEST)
  - Summer (DST): UTC+11 (AEDT)
- Postcode: 2083
- County: Cumberland
- Parish: Cowan
Suburbs around Brooklyn
Berowra Heights	Mooney Mooney	Patonga
Cowan	Brooklyn	Dangar Island
Berowra	Berowra	Berowra

Brooklyn is a small suburb of Sydney along the Hawkesbury River in New South Wales, Australia. It is located on the Pacific Highway in the local government area of the Hornsby Shire. Brooklyn is the northern most suburb of Sydney in the eastern corridor along the Pacific Highway. The suburb is surrounded by the Muogamarra Nature Reserve and occupies a strip of waterfront along the southern bank of the Hawkesbury River, and had a population of 737 as of the 2021 census.

The town provides a range of amenities and activities, while maintaining a quiet village atmosphere. Brooklyn provides convenient access for North Shore residents and day trippers to the Hawkesbury River and Pittwater waterways for boating, swimming and fishing, and to Ku-ring-gai Chase National Park and Muogamarra Nature Reserve for bushwalking and scenic views. Hornsby Council is currently developing a 'Brooklyn Master Plan' to provide for further improvement of the amenities in the area.

Hawkesbury River railway station on the Central Coast & Newcastle line is served by Sydney Trains services to the city and the Central Coast and Hunter. The Pacific Highway and the M1 Pacific Motorway are both nearby and provide easy access to the town. Ku-ring-gai Chase National Park borders the suburb to the south. Long Island runs parallel with the suburb on the opposite side of Sandbrook Inlet and is joined to Brooklyn by the railway causeway. Dangar Island is located to the northeast.

== History ==
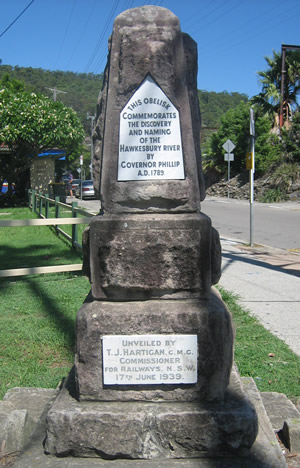
The Hawkesbury River was named by Governor Phillip in 1789

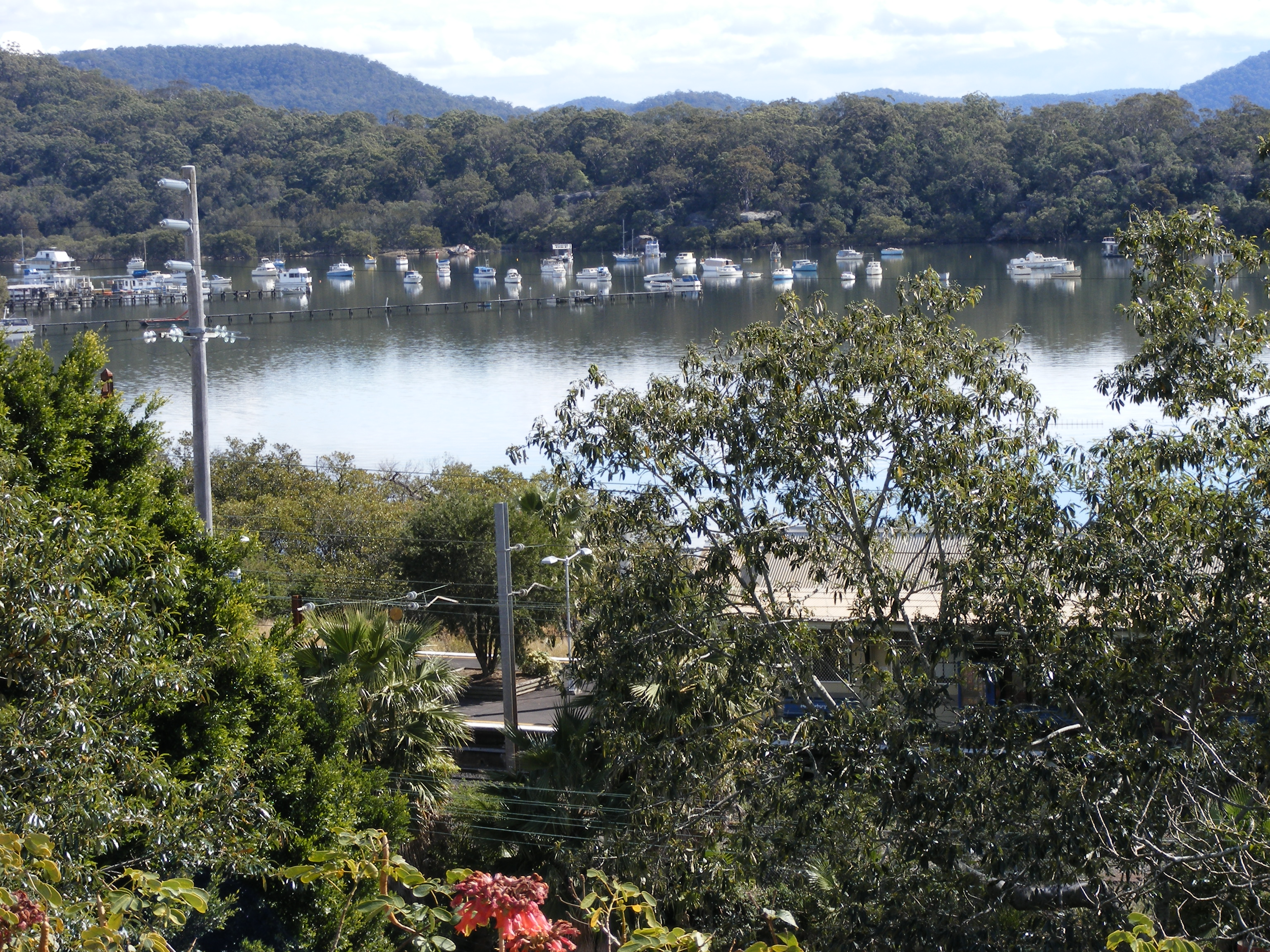
Viewing NW over Hawkesbury River railway station showing moored vessels in Sandrook Inlet and Long Island (nature reserve) beyond

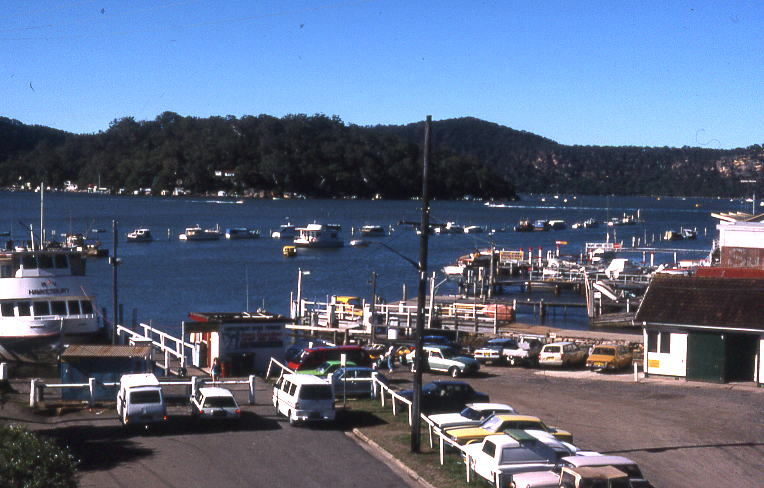
General view showing Hawkesbury River and densely wooded ridges in the background

The general area was known as Peat's Ferry crossing for a long time until January 1884 when a plan of survey for the subdivision of land owned by Peter and William Fagan was registered with the suburb name of Brooklyn. A hotel of the same name followed later in the year. The town owes its existence and location to the main northern railway line with the railway arriving in Brooklyn in 1887 when the single track section north from Hornsby was completed.

In January 1886, the Union Bridge Company from New York was awarded the contract to build a railway bridge across the Hawkesbury River. The American roots of the bridge are reflected in the name given to the construction camp, which was named after the 1883 Brooklyn Bridge. The town name survives to the present day. The Hawkesbury River Railway Bridge was the final link in the Eastern seaboard rail network and was a major engineering feat at the time of its construction. "Hawkesbury River" was the original platform name when the station opened in 1887 but the nomenclature varied over the following twenty years with the names "Flat Rock", "Brooklyn" and "Hawkesbury" all being used until the final change in 1906 to Hawkesbury River.

Peat's Ferry Post Office opened on 1 January 1874 and was renamed Brooklyn in 1888.

Brooklyn is positioned at the northern end of the Cowan Bank, a scenic stretch of steep track on a 1 in 40 grade. The line drops 200 metres from the ridgetop near Cowan to almost water level, passing through four tunnels in the process. Prior to electrification and diesel locomotives, Brooklyn was a staging post for trains heading south to Sydney with "push up" or bank engines being attached to the rear of steam trains here for extra assistance on the 8-kilometre climb to Cowan.

There have been three major railway accidents in Brooklyn over the years. On 21 June 1887, an excursion train from Sydney ran out of control down the steep Cowan Bank. There were two other trains full of holidaymakers standing at the platforms at Hawkesbury River railway station and disaster was only averted by the alert station master who could hear the roaring engine and frantic whistling. He dispatched a railway porter to throw the points lever open and divert the runaway down a siding that led to the new bridge site. The train lost speed along the railway causeway out to Long Island and collided with some empty wagons. The locomotive slid off the embankment and ended up partially submerged in the river. The engine driver was trapped in the cabin and drowned but the fireman escaped. The toll was six dead and seventy injured.

On 20 January 1944 the local bus stalled across the railway tracks at the level crossing in Brooklyn Road and was hit by the northbound Kempsey mail train. Seventeen people were killed.

In the Cowan rail accident on 6 May 1990 an interurban electric train ran into the rear of a heritage steam train which had stalled climbing the Cowan Bank. Six people lost their lives.

Early road traffic was conveyed across the river by George Peat's ferry and prior to the first road bridge being completed there were two vehicular ferries in operation, the "Frances Peat" and the "George Peat". The new concrete road laid down between Hornsby and Gosford had been completed by 1930 and the increased traffic was beyond the capacity of the ferries. Long queues formed on holiday weekends as vehicles awaited their turn.

Work began on the first road bridge in September 1938 and it opened in May 1945. The width and depth of the river between Kangaroo Point and Mooney Mooney presented problems. The total distance to be covered was nearly 800 metres, but an embankment of fill was built out from the northern side, and the actual bridge spans only covered 580 metres. The southern foundation pier was sunk to 233 feet below high water before reaching bedrock, only 8 inches (20 cm) short of a world record. The bridge cost A£190,000 to build. This was supplemented by a second road bridge, a six-lane concrete construction that was completed in 1973 as part of the Sydney to Newcastle freeway.

In 1901 the Duke and Duchess of York (later King George V and Queen Mary), whilst in Australia for the opening of the first federal parliament, anchored their yacht the "Ophir" in Cowan Creek and boarded the paddle wheel steamboat the "General Gordon" for a tour of the lower Hawkesbury.

A small obelisk unveiled in 1939, adjacent to the railway station and the avenue of tall palms in McKell Park, commemorates the discovery and naming of the Hawkesbury River by governor Arthur Phillip in 1789.

== Recreation amenities and activities ==
Visitors to the town can enjoy several cafés both in the town and on the waterfront with a focus on local seafood. A range of other options for meals include the Angler's Rest Hotel and the new Estuary restaurant at Kangaroo Point. The iconic 'Peat's Bite' restaurant on the Hawkesbury River is only a 10-minute boat ride from Brooklyn.

Boating and fishing are major tourist attractions in Brooklyn. There are several local marinas which provide boat hire, marine services, supplies and fuel for boaties, and houseboat rental for those who want to spend a few days enjoying the river. The Hawkesbury River is also a venue for dragon boat racing and Brooklyn is home to the 'Hawkesbury River Dragons' dragon boat racing club.

McKell Park is a popular spot for picnickers. It provides river views and multiple venues for recreation. The park encompasses the entire headland from the northern waterfront with its netted public swimming pool and children's playground, to the picnic area at Flatrock lookout, around to Parsley Bay which has a large new boat ramp, multiple pontoons for water access, a large parking area for cars with room for boat trailers and a park with barbecue facilities. Yachts are anchored here with permanent moorings and kayaks can be hired in Parsley Bay to explore the waterways. The waterfront trail around McKell park is a short walk. There is also a multi-use sporting field and children's playground near Baden Powell Hall on Brooklyn Road.

The town has a present art scene with a number of local artists providing works which can be viewed and purchased at the Edge Art Space on Brooklyn Road and the Redfish Cafe Gallery. Brooklyn holds its annual Spring Fair and Markets at the Brooklyn Soccer Oval in September.

Brooklyn is surrounded by reserves with plenty of scope for bushwalking. The town is on the route of the famous Great North Walk, a 250 km bushwalking trail from Sydney to Newcastle. Visitors can use this trail to access excellent views within a short distance from the town. The annual Oxfam 100 km Trailwalker charity event also starts from Parsley Bay in Brooklyn. The Muogamarra Nature Reserve is open for several weeks each year during the spring wildflower season. An entry charge applies, and there are guided and unguided walks within the reserve which is closed to the public outside these times. A wide variety of Aboriginal rock carvings can be seen here along with sections of the old Peats Ferry Road.

The Riverboat Postman, which commenced in 1910, takes tourists on its mail run to boat access only settlements along the Hawkesbury River and departs weekdays from the Brooklyn Public Wharf. The trip is popular with tourists and this is a great way to enjoy the river's scenery and waterways up close. Alternately you can catch the ferry to Dangar Island for a walk, a picnic, or a meal at the island cafe. The Riverboat Postman leaves Ferry Wharf in Dangar Road adjacent to the railway station on its daily run (Monday – Friday) delivering mail and supplies to the water access only communities of Dangar Island, Wobby, Bar Point, Marlow Creek and Milsons Passage.

Brooklyn Public School is the local primary (junior) school, with high school students going to either private schools (Abbotsleigh, Barker College, Knox Grammar), selective high schools (Hornsby Girls, Normanhurst Boys) or public high schools such as Asquith Boys and Asquith Girls. All these high schools are located next to the train line and are a short train journey from Brooklyn (Hawkesbury River Station).

Accommodation can be found at the Brooklyn Hotel, The Anglers Rest Hotel, and on various websites.

== Popular culture ==
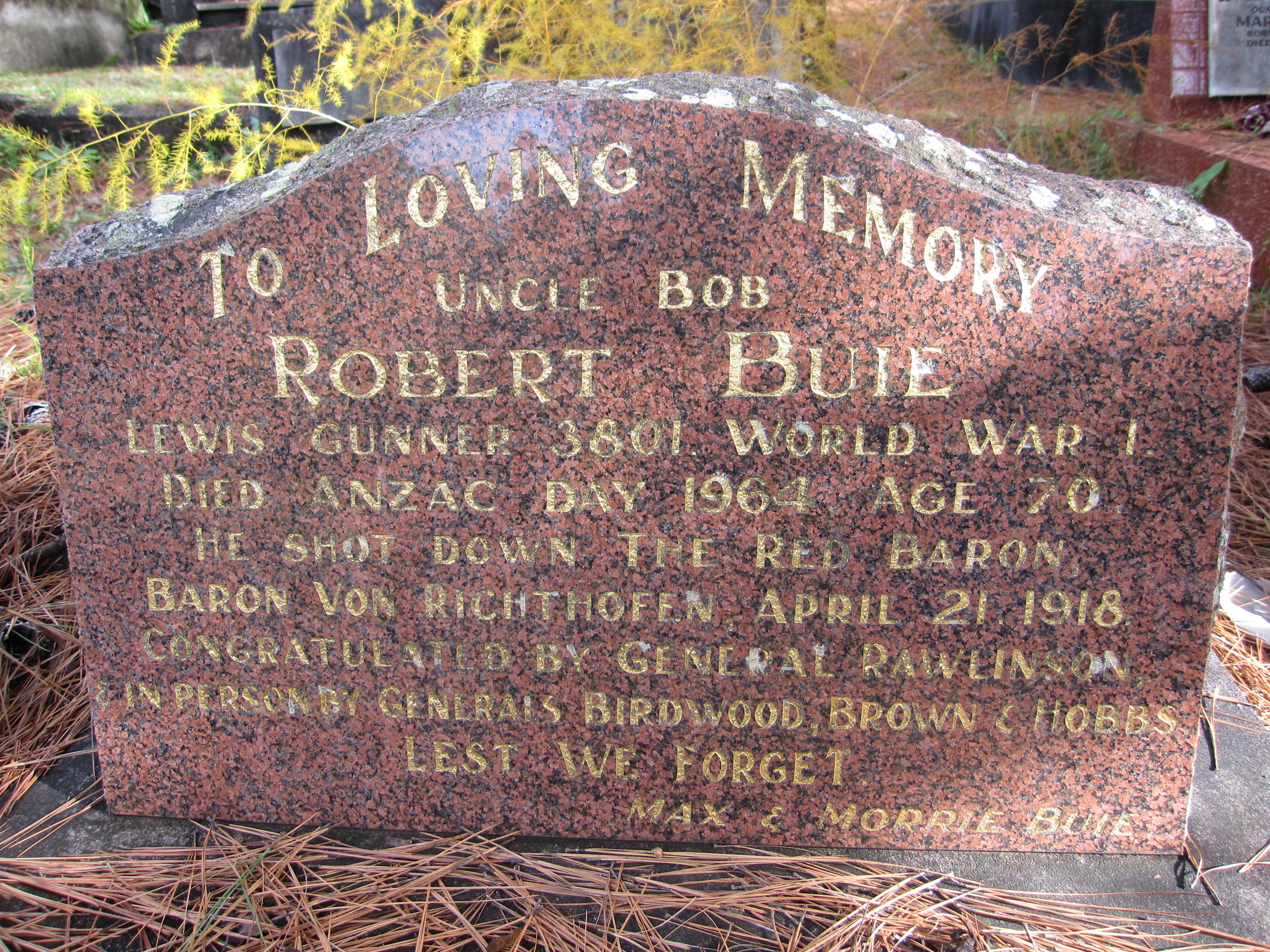
Robert Buie headstone

- Robert Buie was a local resident who fought in World War I, and his headstone in the Brooklyn cemetery credits him with shooting down Manfred von Richthofen, the German air ace who is more commonly known as the "Red Baron".
- The 2005 movie Oyster Farmer was filmed in and around Brooklyn. Many local residents were employed as extras.

== Demographics ==
According to the 2021 census, there were 737 residents in Brooklyn. 76.7% of people were born in Australia, with the next most common countries of birth being England 5.7%, the United States of America 1.9%, New Zealand 1.5%, South Africa 1.5% and Scotland 0.9%. 90.0% of people only spoke English at home, the next most common languages spoken at home were Gujarati 1.2%, Russian 0.8%, German 0.7%, Afrikaans 0.7% and Swedish 0.7%. The most common responses for religion were No Religion 50.2%, Anglican 15.3%, Catholic 14.0 and Christian, not further defined 3.1%.

== Heritage listings ==
Brooklyn has a number of heritage-listed sites, including:

- Main Northern railway: Hawkesbury River railway station
- Main Northern railway: Hawkesbury River Railway Bridge

== Commercial area ==
The town has traditionally been associated with the farming of Sydney rock oysters with generations of the same families involved. Oyster beds are a common sight along wide sections of the river but in 2004 the disease QX wiped out production. The industry was allowed to produce and export products in 2011 after a large cleaning effort.

== Transport ==
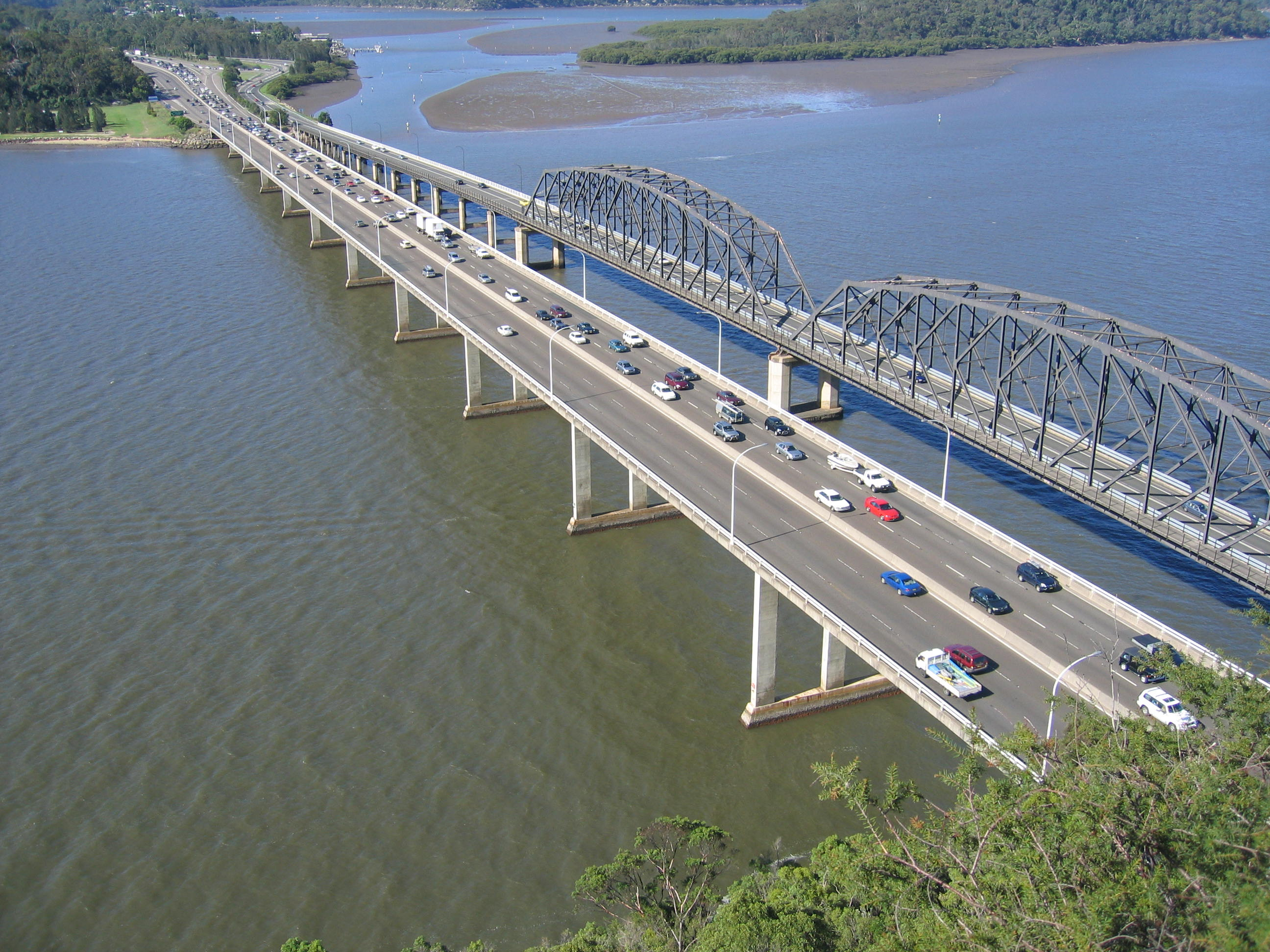
The Hawkesbury River, with the Brooklyn Bridge carrying the Pacific Motorway (M1) on the left and the Peats Ferry Bridge carrying the Pacific Highway (B83) on the right; looking from south to north

Hawkesbury River railway station is on the Main Northern railway line, which is served by Central Coast & Newcastle Line services. The Pacific Highway (B83) and the Pacific Motorway (M1) are major arterial roads located adjacent to Brooklyn. Access to Brooklyn via the Pacific Motorway requires exiting the motorway at Mooney Mooney on the northern shore of the Hawkesbury River and crossing the Peats Ferry Bridge via the Pacific Highway.

Brooklyn is the base for Hawkesbury Cruises running The Riverboat Postman each weekday at 10:00 am, and by Brooklyn Ferry services running the route to Dangar Island from 6:00 am every day, the service runs once each hour. On 21 August 2025, the Brooklyn ferry service started accepting the Opal card ticketing system.

CDC NSW operates one bus route through Brooklyn:

- 592: Brooklyn to Hornsby via Mooney Mooney, Cowan, Berowra and Asquith

== Kangaroo Point ==
The southern ends of the Pacific Motorway (M1) Hawkesbury Bridge and the Pacific Highway Peats Ferry Bridge across the Hawkesbury River are located at Kangaroo Point. It has been termed "the entrance to Sydney" by those commuting from the north. The first Australian five-pound note included a picture of Kangaroo Point. In 2012 Hornsby Shire Council undertook building work to construct viewing platforms and recreational areas.

== See also ==
- Long Island
- Cowan Bank
- Dangar Island

== Notes ==
1. This is the area of the ABS Census Collection District, not the whole suburb as registered by New South Wales Land & Property Information.
