= Cowan, New South Wales =

Cowan
- Suburb
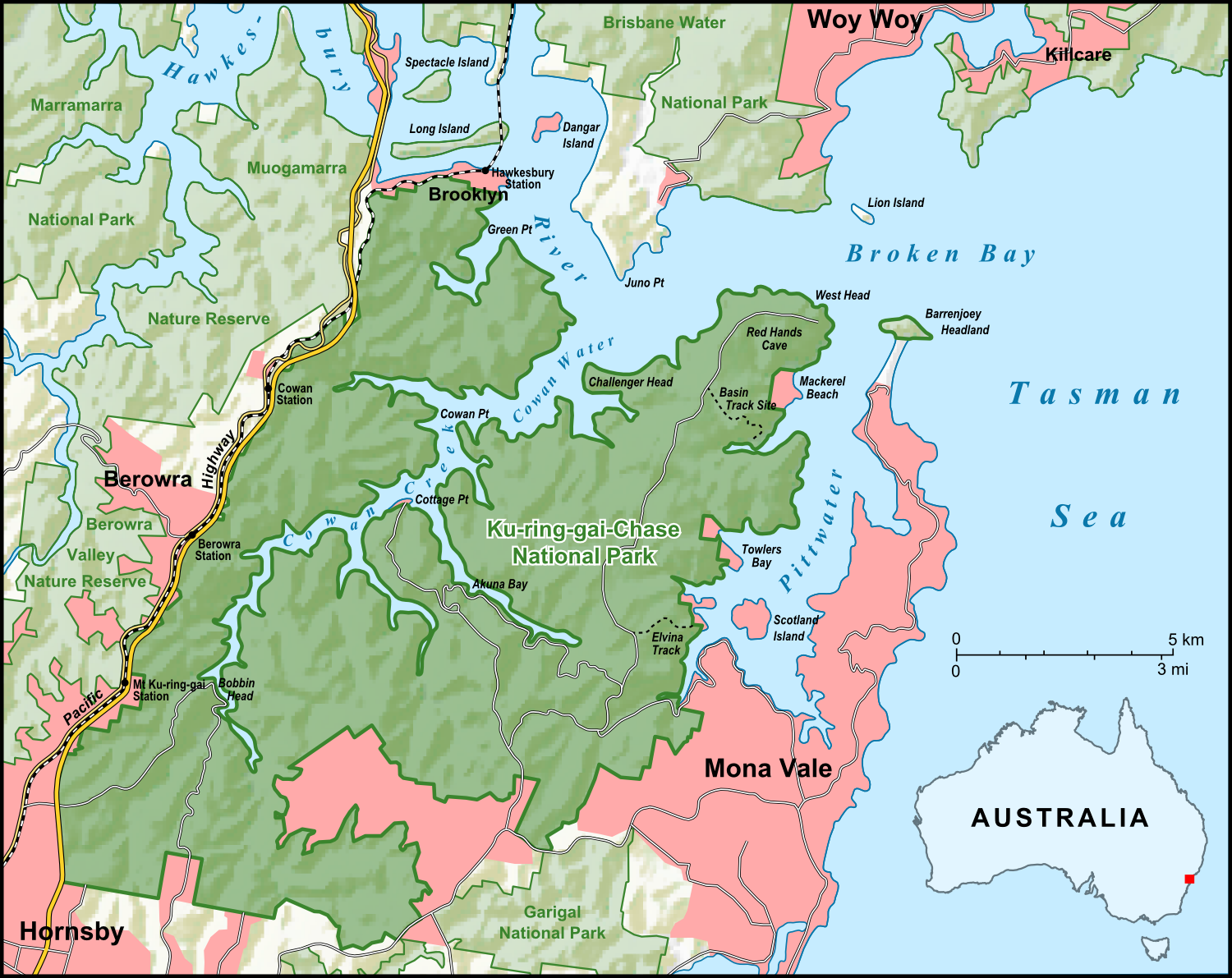
- Pacific Highway passing through Cowan

- Interactive map of Cowan
- Coordinates: 33°35′27″S 151°10′10″E
- Country: Australia
- State: New South Wales
- City: Sydney
- LGA: Hornsby Shire
- Location: 38 km (24 mi) north of Sydney CBD; 37 km (23 mi) south-west of Gosford

Government
  - State electorate: Hornsby
  - Federal division: Berowra

Area
  - Total: 8.7 km^{2} (3.4 sq mi)
- Elevation: 207 m (679 ft)

Population
  - Total: 631 (2021 census)
  - Density: 72.5/km^{2} (187.8/sq mi)
- Postcode: 2081
Suburbs around Cowan
Berowra Heights	Mooney Mooney	Brooklyn
Berowra Heights	Cowan	Brooklyn
Berowra	Berowra	Berowra

Cowan is a small outer suburb of Northern Sydney in the state of New South Wales, Australia, approximately 40 kilometres (25 mi) north of the Sydney central business district, in the local government area of Hornsby Shire. Cowan shares the postcode of 2081 with Berowra.

== History ==
Numerous ideas exist concerning the origin of the town's name. These include that it comes from an Aboriginal word meaning big water, opposite or the other side; that it was derived from a tree on which cowa, meaning mountain, was carved; that it might be named for one of two convicts listed in the 1828 census; or, that it is named after Kirkcowan in Britain.

Besides the English botanist George Caley, who explored the area in 1805, the first Europeans to visit the area were timber-getters. The timber from Cowan was used for coach building, one of the first industries in the area.

The railway stop at Cowan was originally a crossing loop to allow trains on the single-line north track to pass each other, and it was also the point at which auxiliary steam engines, connected to the trains at Hawkesbury River station (Brooklyn), were disconnected after the steep haul to the top of the plateau. A station and platform were constructed in 1901. With the coming of the railway, Cowan become a popular holiday spot and a regular starting point for bushwalkers.

In 1958, the rail line was electrified, and this also increased the number of people visiting the area, with families moving into the suburb, particularly those wanting to raise children in a bushland setting but near the city.

There has been little change in Cowan village since it was first laid out as a crown subdivision in 1910. Lots ranged from 1,500 to 4,500 square metres.

The predominance of freestanding three-bedroom houses set in gardens provides a sense of openness, and creates a transition to the bushland which surrounds the town.

== Demographics ==
In the 2021 census, there were 631 people in Cowan. 81.9% of people were born in Australia, the next most common countries of birth included England 3.5%, Korea, Republic of (South) 1.6%, South Africa 1.6%, New Zealand 1.4% and the Philippines 1.3%. 91.3% of people spoke only English at home, the next most common languages spoken at home included Korean 1.1%, Persian (excluding Dari) 1.0%, German 0.6%, Dutch 0.6% and Finnish 0.6%. The most common responses for religion were No Religion 46.0%, Anglican 15.8%, Catholic 13.5%, Christian, not further defined 6.0% and Uniting Church 3.0%.

== Transport ==
Access by road to Cowan is via the Pacific Highway which traverses Cowan north to south. The M1 Sydney to Newcastle Freeway runs past Cowan.

The Main Northern railway line runs parallel to the Pacific Highway through most of Cowan, descending north of the town via Cowan Bank. Cowan railway station is served by Sydney Trains Central Coast & Newcastle Line services to Newcastle and Sydney Central.

Electric overhead railway power facilities are located in the north of Cowan. Cowan Bank was the location of the 1990 Cowan railway accident, in which there were five deaths.

CDC NSW operates one bus route through Cowan:

- 592: Hornsby to Brooklyn via Asquith, Mount Colah, Mount Ku-ring-gai and Berowra

== Commercial area ==
There was a single General Store that serves the Cowan community, which was located on the corner of the Pacific Highway and Fraser Road.

A notable landmark of the Cowan area is the "Pie in the Sky" pie shop located approximately one kilometre north of Cowan on the Pacific Highway. Pie in the Sky was featured in the Australian film Lantana, and is a frequent stop for day-trippers, bicycle riders and motor-scooter enthusiasts on weekends.

Austral Watergardens is one of the only water gardens in Australia.

== Tourism ==
Cowan, set in the outermost area of Sydney's north, lies in a valley with vast areas of bushland between the waterways of both Berowra and Cowan Creek. The suburb provides hiking access to a network of trails through the Great North Walk and the Jerusalem Bay Track from the railway station for walks combing distances with some steep sections.

== Facilities ==
Cowan Community Hall is a service provided by Hornsby Shire Council. Cowan Park and a small picnic area are adjacent to the Fire Station on View Street. Cowan is served by one public primary school, Cowan Public School.

Fire protection for the entire area of Cowan is provided by the NSW Rural Fire Service, through Cowan Rural Fire Brigade, however, a Mutual Aid Agreement with Fire and Rescue NSW ensures that Fire and Rescue NSW will also respond to any urban fire incidents within Cowan.

Cowan Post Office opened on 14 December 1936 and closed in 1993, however, postal services are still available in the local General Store.

Cowan is the head of two walking trails into the adjacent National Parks, one west, one east. The Jerusalem Bay trail is well known and a part of the Great North Walk. The Bujwa Bay trail takes the west view.

== Jerusalem Bay ==
On 31 December 2017 a de Havilland Canada DHC-2 Beaver sea plane crashed on Jerusalem Bay (Cowan Creek) East of Cowan. The pilot and five British passengers perished in the crash.

== Notable residents ==
- Frank Duarte – physicist and author (former resident).
