= Muogamarra Nature Reserve =

Nature reserve in Australia

- IUCN category Ia (strict nature reserve)
- Location within New South Wales
- Location: New South Wales
- Nearest city: Cowan
- Coordinates: 33°33′12″S 151°11′10″E
- Area: 22.74 km^{2} (8.78 sq mi)
- Established: June 1960
- Visitors: Limited access during spring annually only
- Governing body: NSW National Parks and Wildlife Service
- Website: Official website

The Muogamarra Nature Reserve (/muˌoʊɡəˈmɑːrə/) is a protected nature reserve in the Sydney region of New South Wales, in eastern Australia. The 2,274-hectare (5,620-acre) reserve is situated in the northern edge of Sydney and lies between the suburb of Cowan to the south, and the Hawkesbury River to the north.

== Features ==
The vegetation is mainly dry sclerophyll forest and shrubs on rocky areas, as well as mangroves along the river.

The reserve is closed to the public for most of the year, and opens for six weekends each year in spring, when there are prolific displays of wildflowers. At other times of the year it is available to groups such as the scouts or to schools for education or special events. During the weekends that the reserve is open to the public, volunteers provide guided walks around some of the trails.

Access to the Muogamarra Nature Reserve is via the Pacific Highway (not the M1 Pacific Motorway), approximately 3 to 3.5 kilometres (1.9 to 2.2 mi) north of Cowan, near the Pie in the Sky cafe. A small gravel road with a gate is located on the left of the northbound dual carriageway with a 3-kilometre (1.9 mi) long narrow gravel road that is accessible to most motor vehicles that leads into the reserve. The reserve facilities include an unsealed carpark, toilets, a small open grassy area and the main information centre. An entry fee applies.

=== Aboriginal sites ===
There are many Aboriginal sites in the Muogamarra Nature Reserve, especially rock art engravings and grinding grooves.

== History ==
In 1836 George Peat was granted 50 acres (20 ha) on the Hawkesbury River at what is now Peats Bight. He built huts and a wharf there, and farmed his land. A dairy farm was then built nearby at Peats Crater. Founded by John Duncan Tipper in 1934 when he leased 600 acres (240 ha) to protect the flora, fauna and aboriginal sites, due to his concern at the loss of Hawkesbury sandstone forest. He named the site 'Muogamarra', which he believed was an aboriginal Awabakal word meaning "preserve for the future". This area was at the northern end of what is now the nature reserve. Over time Tipper expanded his lease to 2,050 acres (830 ha). In 1954 the land was given up by Tipper and gazetted as Muogamarra Sanctuary.

The 750-acre (300 ha) Sir Edward Hallstrom Faunal Reserve was dedicated in 1961 in what is now the southern part of the nature reserve. This was the work of Allen Strom and Sir Edward Hallstrom. In March 1969 the two areas were amalgamated into what is now Muogamarra Nature Reserve, under the control of the NSW National Parks and Wildlife Service.

== Walks ==
The Muogamarra Nature Reserve has several short day walks, beginning at the main information centre:

- Point Loop – A short, flat loop 2-kilometre (1.2 mi) walk from the carpark, with wildflowers. Goes to a viewpoint over Peats Crater and the Hawkesbury River.
- J. D. Tipper Loop – A short mostly flat 1-kilometre (0.62 mi) walk to the lookout named for the founder of Muogamarra Nature Reserve views overlooking Brooklyn.
- Lloyd Trig – A slightly longer mostly flat 4-kilometre (2.5 mi) walk on an old road built by convict labour to Lloyd Trig Point, with views of the Hawkesbury River area.
- Peats Crater – A fairly long 10-kilometre (6.2 mi) walk with a 200-metre (660 ft) descent and matching ascent which follows a convict road to the site of George Peat's farm at Peats Crater, which is also a geological feature.
- Deerubbin Lookover – A medium length 6-kilometre (3.7 mi) walk with a 110-metre (360 ft) descent and a similar ascent along the old Peats Ferry convict road to a rock shelter which has views over the Hawkesbury River approximately 180 metres (590 ft) below.
- Bird Gully Swamp – A trail which skirts the edge of a 'hanging swamp' containing a unique plant habitat. Also goes to the top of a waterfall and occupation sites of aboriginal Gu-ring-gai people.

== See also ==
- Protected areas of New South Wales
