= Long Island (New South Wales) =

Island in New South Wales

Coordinates: 33°32′33″S 151°13′07″E

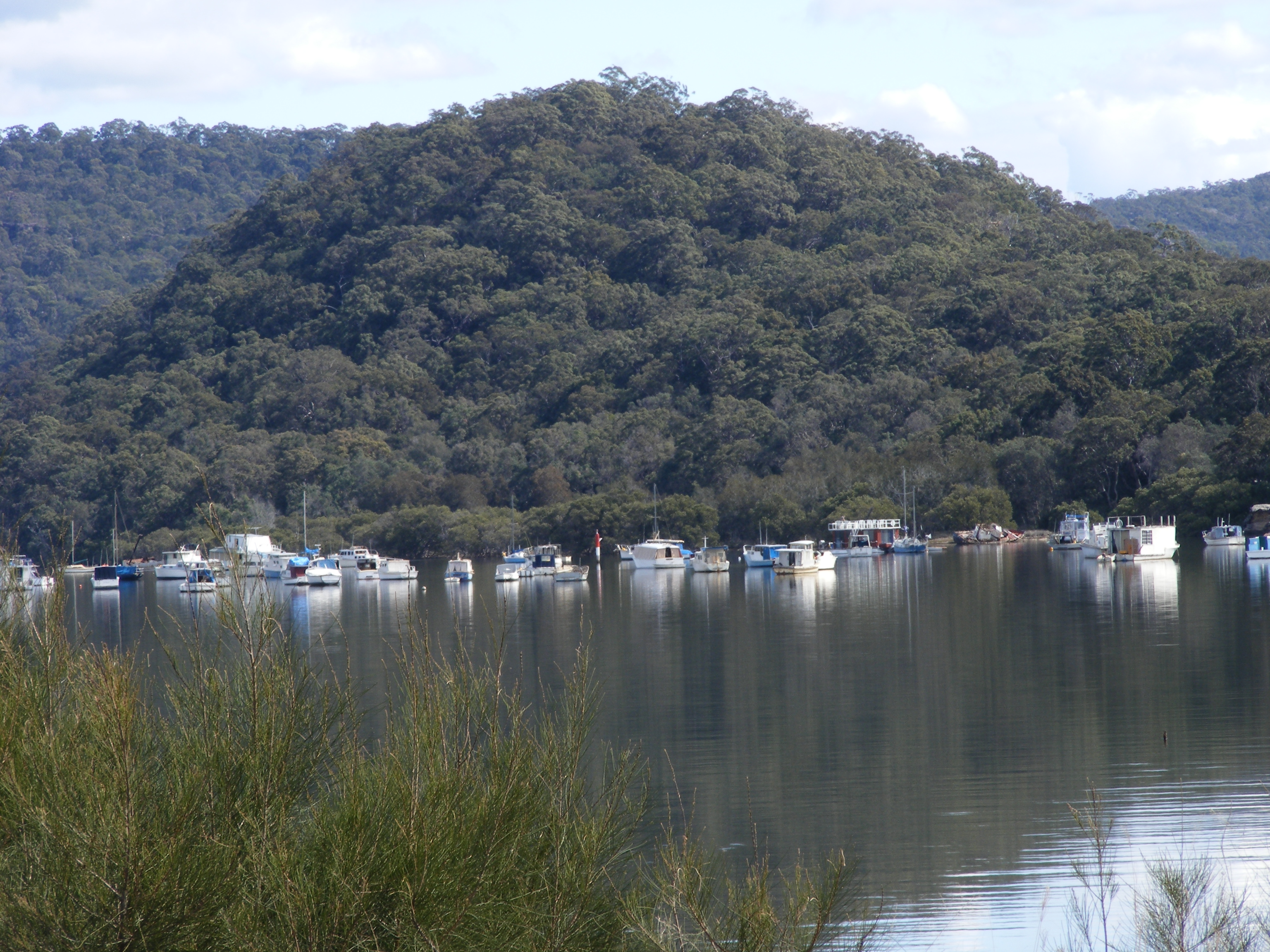
Long Island

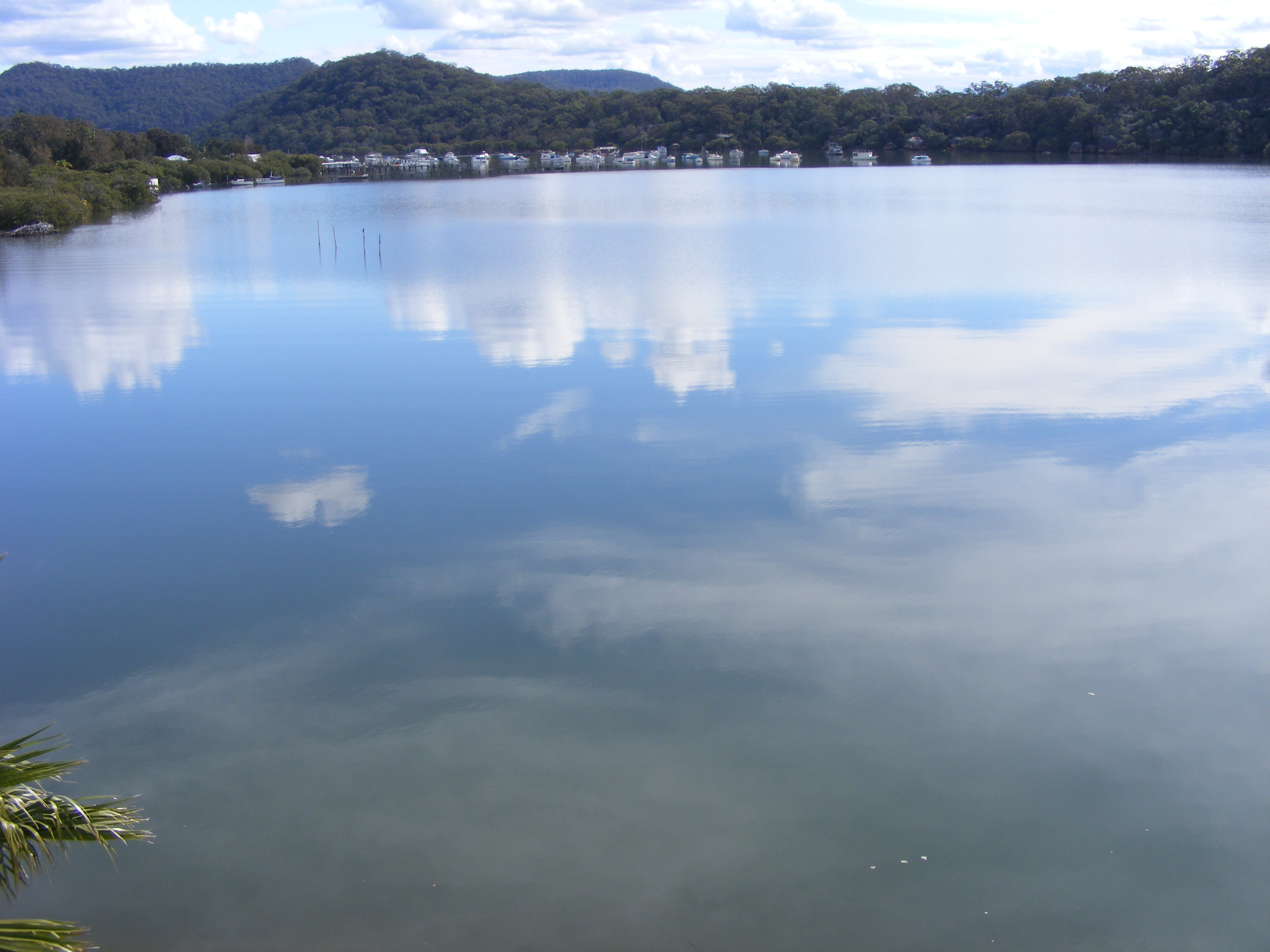
Long Island

Long Island is an elongated island of 73 hectares in the Hawkesbury River, about 50 kilometres (31 mi) north of the Sydney central business district,New South Wales, Australia. It is joined to the mainland at its south eastern edge by the railway causeway across Sandbrook Inlet. At the other end of this causeway is the Sydney suburb of Brooklyn in Hornsby Shire, to which Long Island belongs.

Other islands in the Hawkesbury River include Dangar Island, Spectacle Island, Milson Island, Peat Island and Lion Island.

As with Spectacle Island and Lion Island, Long Island is a nature reserve (73ha, notified in 1972), which means it is illegal to visit without permission from the N.S.W. Office of Environment and Heritage. The New South Wales Parks and Wildlife Service runs very infrequent guided tours of the island, for those who are interested in its flora, fauna, geology and Aboriginal history.

Some of the best views of Long Island are from Lloyd Trigonometrical station, and Tipper's Lookout, both located to the west in nearby Muogamarra Nature Reserve. From these vantage points, it is possible to look down along the length of the island and see the mouth of the Hawkesbury River and Broken Bay in the far distance.

Long Island was added to the Australian National Heritage List in December 2006.

== History ==
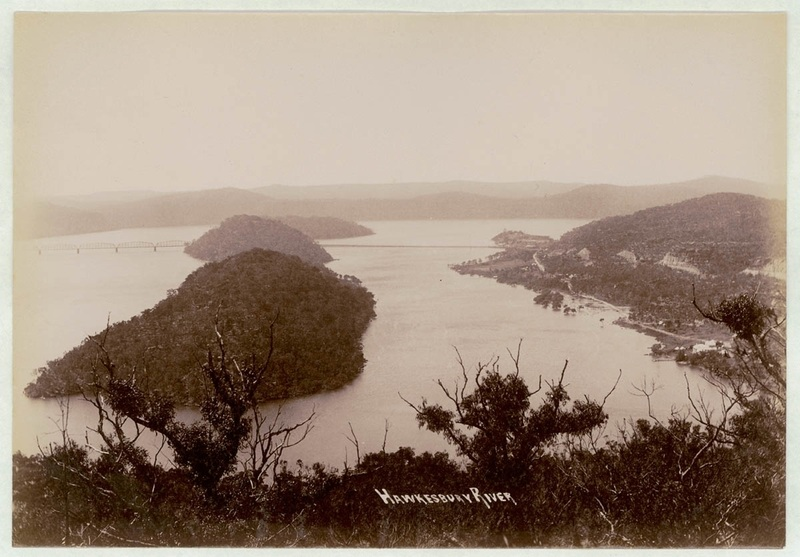
Long Island in the Hawkesbury River, Australia, circa 1900–1910. The first Hawkesbury River Railway Bridge is visible at the top left, and the village of Brooklyn is at the right. Photo courtesy State Library of NSW

The area has been inhabited for thousands of years by the Guringai people, who left their mark on the land with hundreds of rock engravings, stone sharpening sites, cave paintings and shellfish middens. The first European to see the area was Governor Arthur Phillip, who explored the lower river by small boat in March 1788. At first the local people were friendly towards him, but when he returned a year later, they would not come into contact with him. By 1790 over half the Guringai had succumbed to the smallpox the British had brought with them.

Early settlers on the island included timber getters, and by 1873 there are known to have been two houses at either end of the low central saddle. These were owned by George Woods and Albert Nelson, a lime burner and boarding house operator respectively. In the late 1890s, the island was briefly dedicated as the site for an inebriates asylum that was ultimately built on nearby Peat Island several years later.

In 1911, the island was transferred to Hornsby Council for use as a recreation reserve, used mainly by fishermen. The bulk of the island that is not affected by the railway line was subsequently dedicated as a nature reserve in 1972.

== The Railway ==
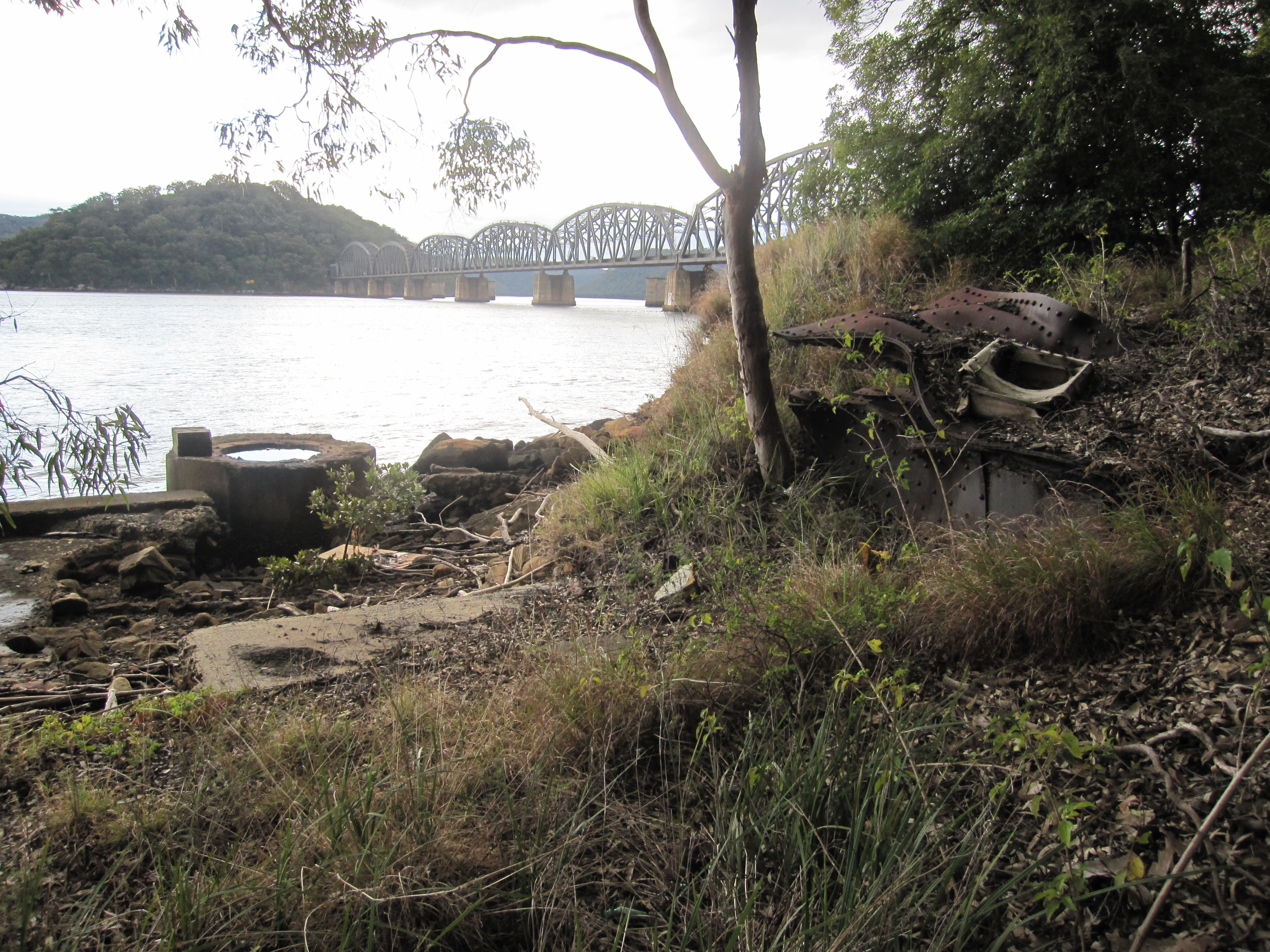
Hawkesbury River Railway Bridge as seen from the bridge construction site on Long Island

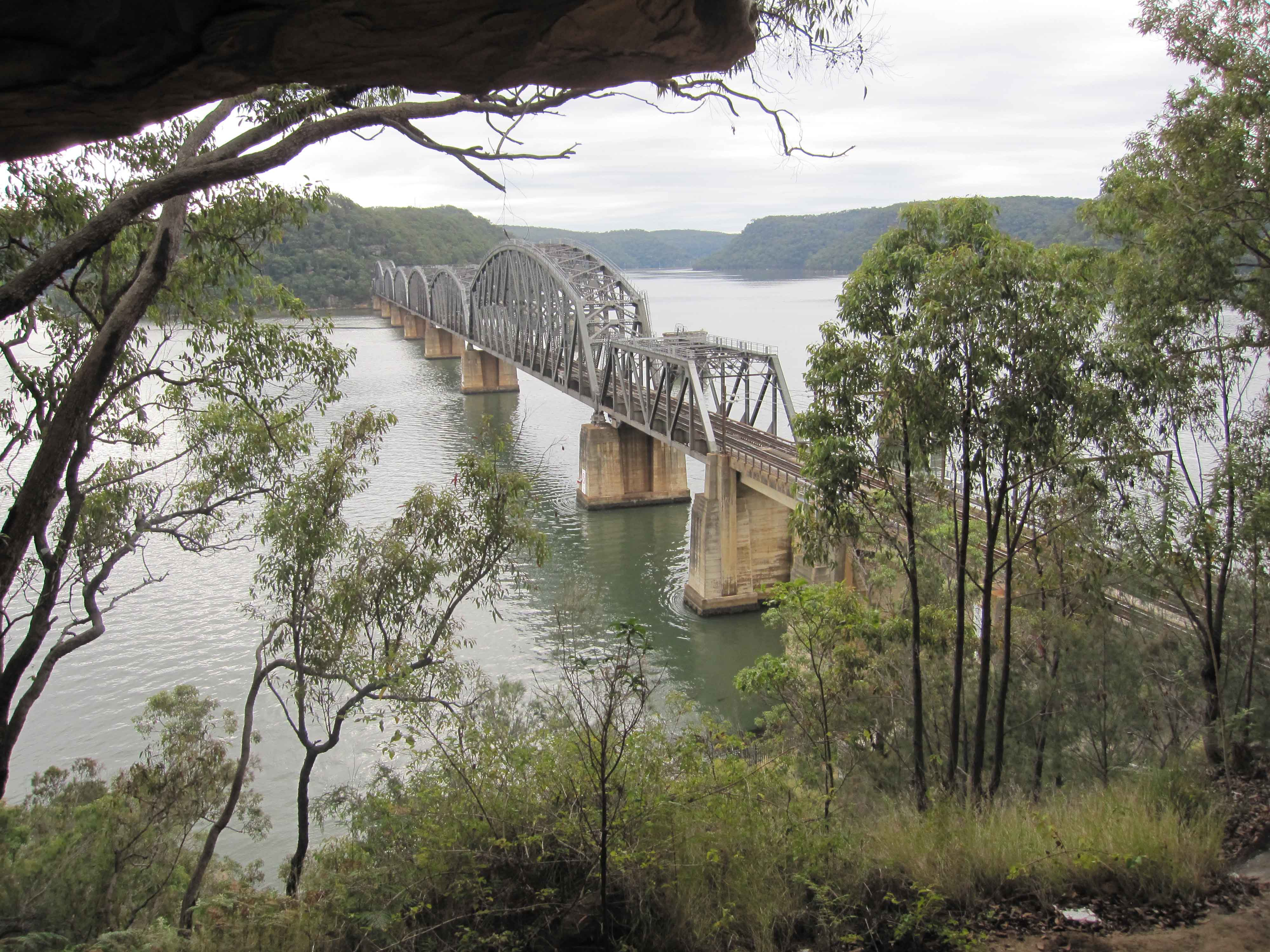
Hawkesbury River Railway Bridge as seen from a cave on Long Island

The Main North railway line from Sydney passes through a tunnel on the eastern end of the island, which is joined to Brooklyn by a railway causeway across Sandbrook Inlet, and to Cogra Point on the northern shore of the Hawkesbury River by the second Hawkesbury River Railway Bridge. The spans for this second bridge, built during the 1940s when it became necessary to replace the first bridge, were assembled on the northeastern side of Long Island, immediately to the west of the current bridge. The remains of the docks and crane mountings are still present on the hillside, and along the water's edge.

Immediately to the east of the existing railway tunnel is the first railway tunnel, that was bored through the island as part of the southern approach for the first Hawkesbury River Railway Bridge. This was abandoned, along with the associated alignment on each side of the river once the replacement bridge was completed in 1946.

== Nomenclature ==
Traditionally, there has been some debate about how the island was named, and whether or not its name was associated with the construction of the first Hawkesbury River Railway Bridge across its eastern extremity by the Union Bridge Company from Buffalo, New York in the mid-1880s. However, there is ample evidence to show that the name pre-dates the construction of the bridge by at least sixty years.

The island was named by the surveyor W.R. Govett in 1829, due to its topography, being long and narrow at 2 kilometres (1.2 mi) by 300 metres (980 ft). Furthermore, an early mention in the press from 1863 mentions an inquiry being conducted on adjacent Dangar Island for a drowned man named "John Foley, a woodman residing at Long Island, at the mouth of the Hawkesbury, ...". Finally, another reference from April 1880 reports the presence of a local surveyor, a Mr Burdett, who is: "... camped on Long Island, from whence he lays the surrounding country under contribution to his theodolite".
