= Hawkesbury River railway station =

Railway station in Sydney, New South Wales, Australia

Hawkesbury River
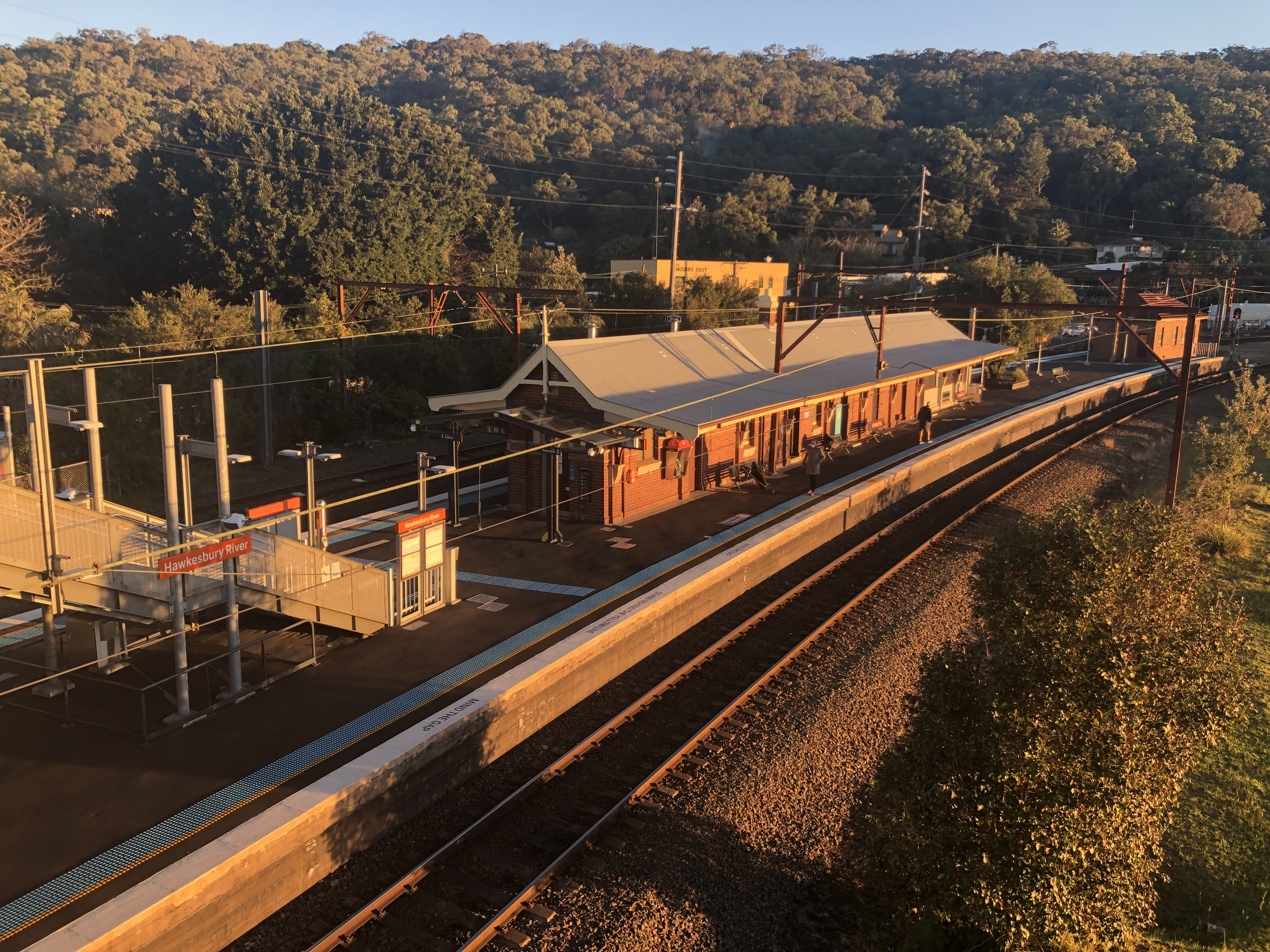
- The station platforms and building at sunset, June 2021

General information
- Location: Dangar Road, Brooklyn, Sydney; Australia
- Coordinates: 33°32′49″S 151°13′35″E
- Elevation: 5 m (16 ft)
- Owner: Transport Asset Manager of New South Wales
- Operator: Sydney Trains
- Lines: Main Northern; Central Coast & Newcastle
- Distance: 57.4 km (35.7 mi) from Central
- Platforms: 2 (1 island)
- Tracks: 3
- Connections: Bus

Construction
- Structure type: Ground
- Accessible: Yes

Other information
- Status: Weekdays: Staffed: 5.30am to 9.30pm: Weekends and public holidays: Unstaffed
- Station code: HKR
- Website: Transport for NSW

History
- Opened: 1870; 156 years ago
- Former names: Flat Rock (construction); Peats Ferry (1870–1888); Brooklyn (1888–1889); Hawkesbury (1890–1906)

Passengers
- 2025: 152,575 (year); 418 (daily) (Sydney Trains, NSW TrainLink)

Services
Preceding station	Intercity Trains	Following station
Wondabyne towards Newcastle Interchange	Central Coast & Newcastle Line	Cowan towards Central
Former services
Preceding station	Former services	Following station
River Wharf Terminus	Main Northern Line (1887-1889)	Berowra towards Sydney
River Wharf Terminus	Main Northern Line (1890-1920) occasional services	Cowan towards Sydney

New South Wales Heritage Register
- Official name: Hawkesbury River Railway Station group; Brooklyn Station
- Type: State heritage (complex / group)
- Designated: 2 April 1999
- Reference no.: 1166
- Type: Railway Platform/Station
- Category: Transport – Rail
- Builders: New South Wales Department of Railways
Location

Hawkesbury River railway station is a heritage-listed railway station located on the Main Northern and Central Coast–Newcastle lines in the Sydney suburb of Brooklyn in New South Wales, Australia. The station serves the town of Brooklyn and is located on the southern bank of the Hawkesbury River. It was designed and built by the Department of Railways New South Wales. It is also known as Hawkesbury River Railway Station group and Brooklyn Station. The property was added to the New South Wales State Heritage Register on 2 April 1999.

== History ==
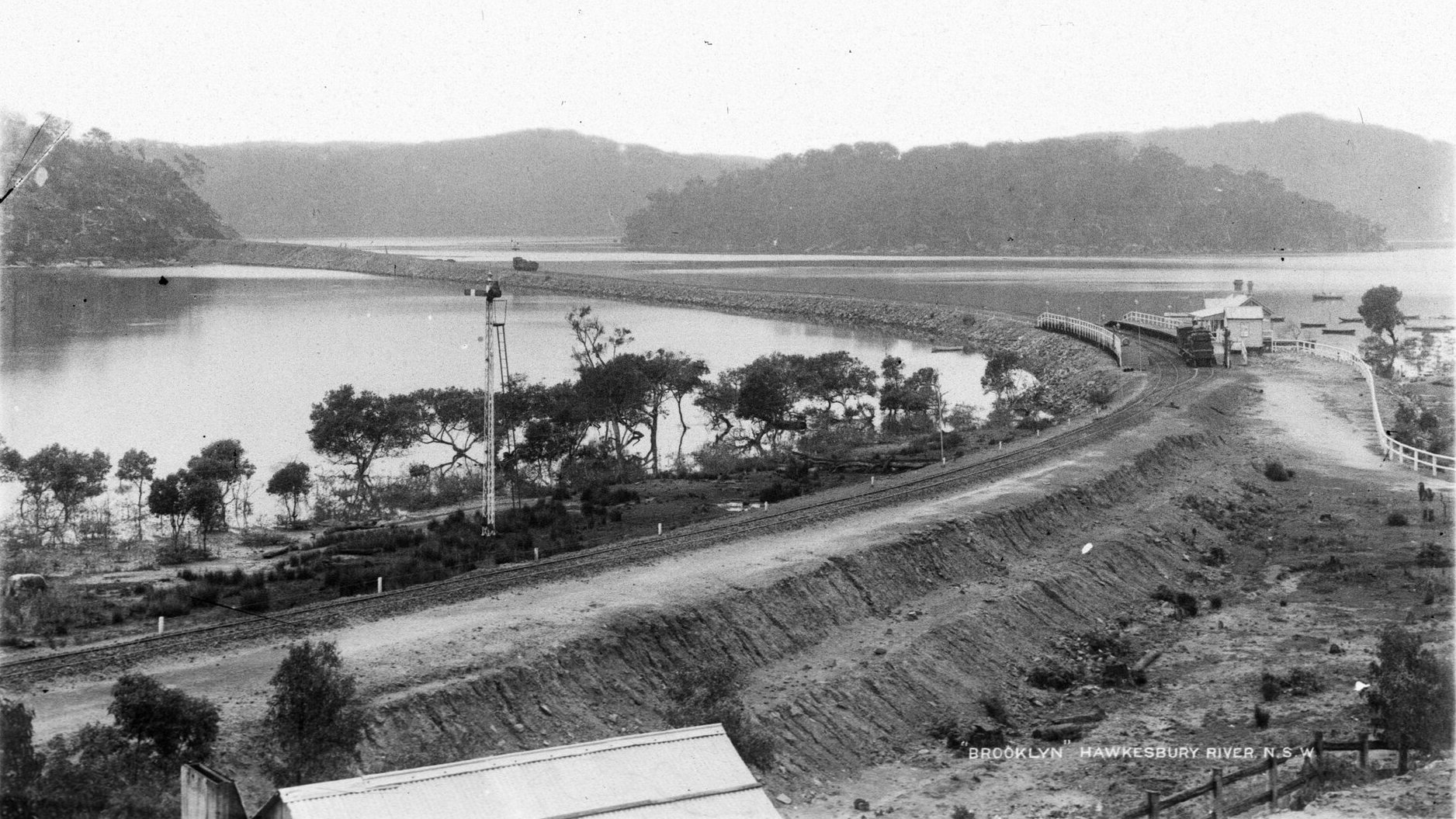
Brooklyn Railway Station in circa 1888

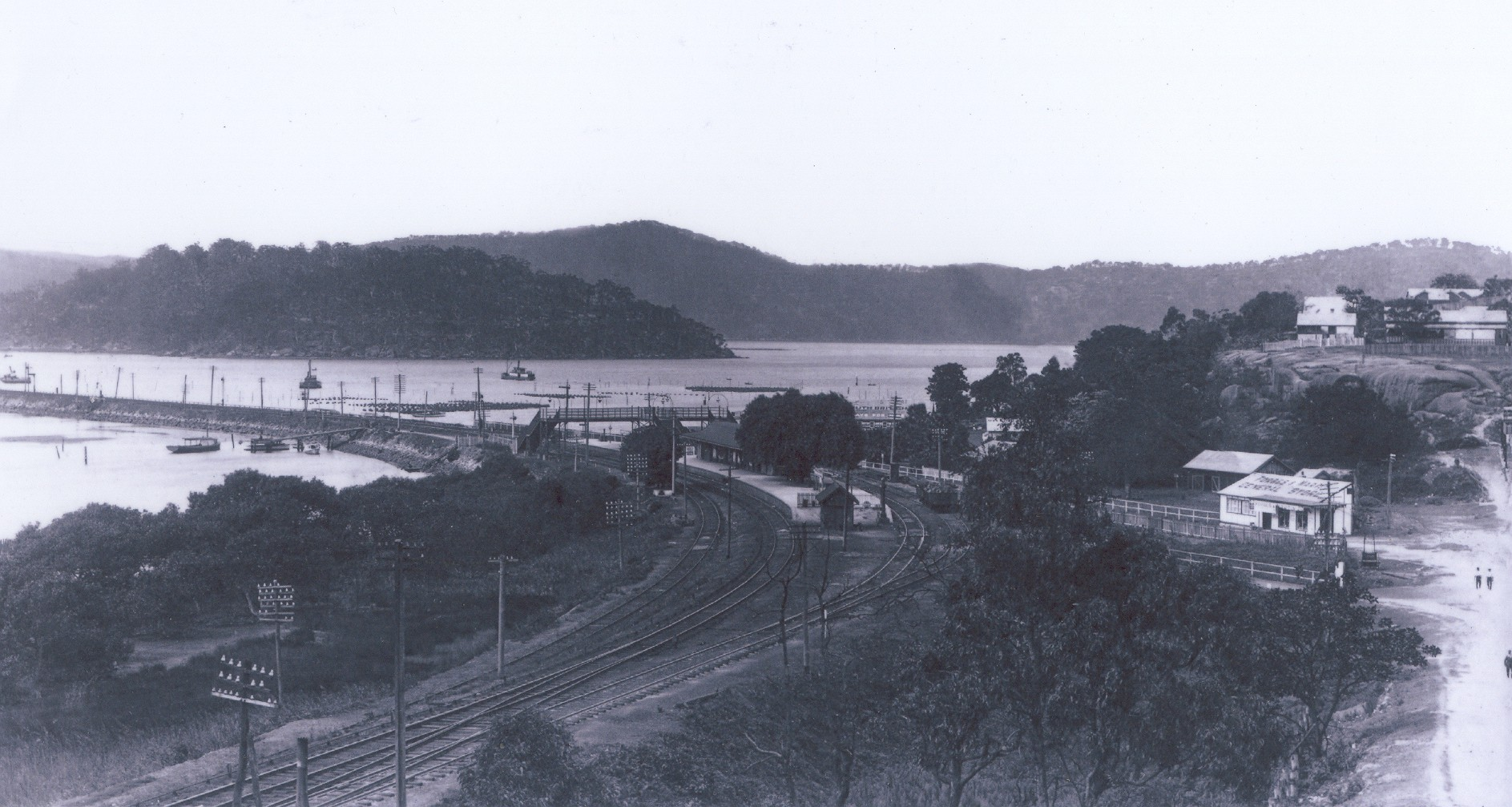
The station, c. 1922.

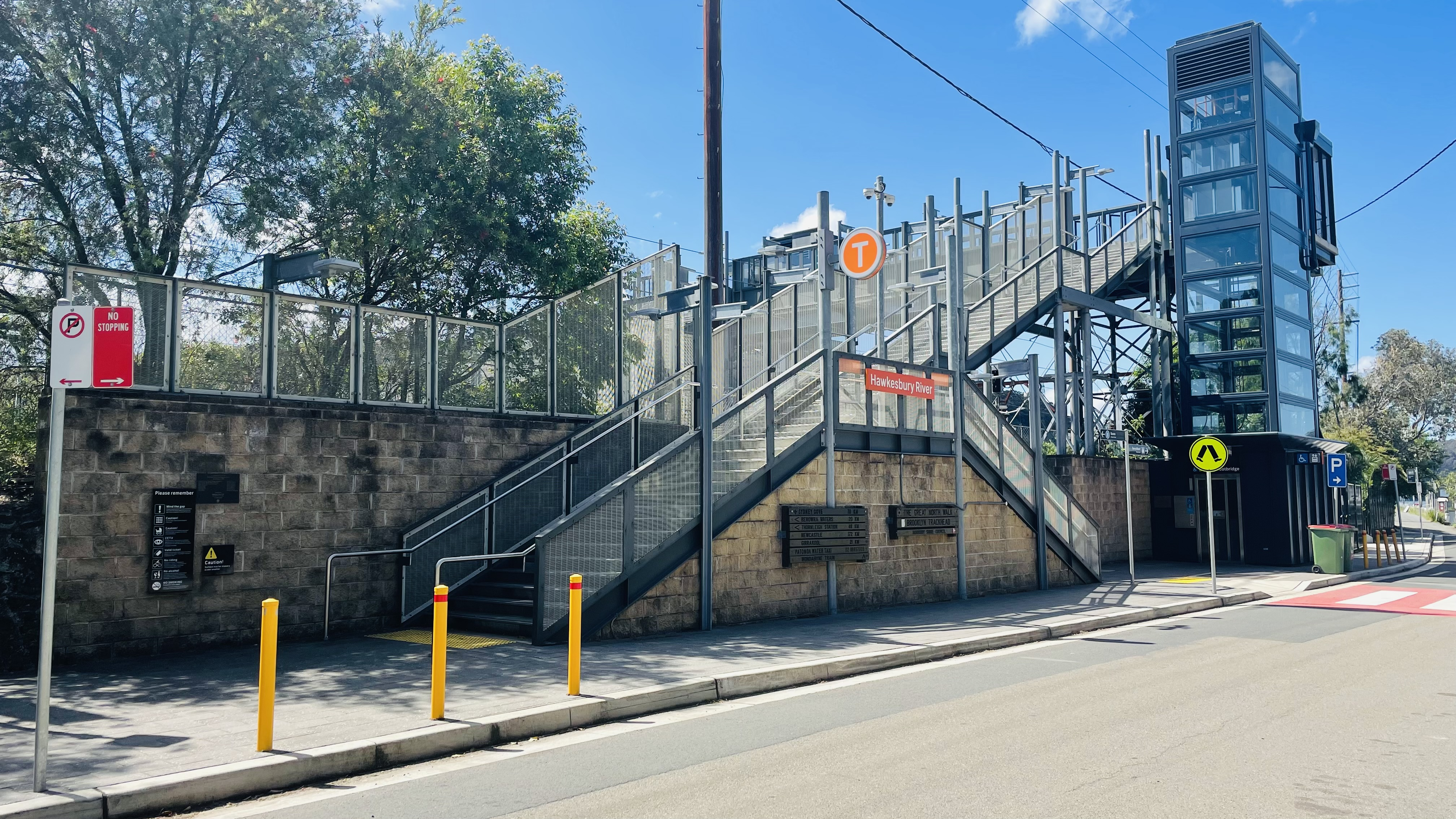
Station entrance on Dangar Road

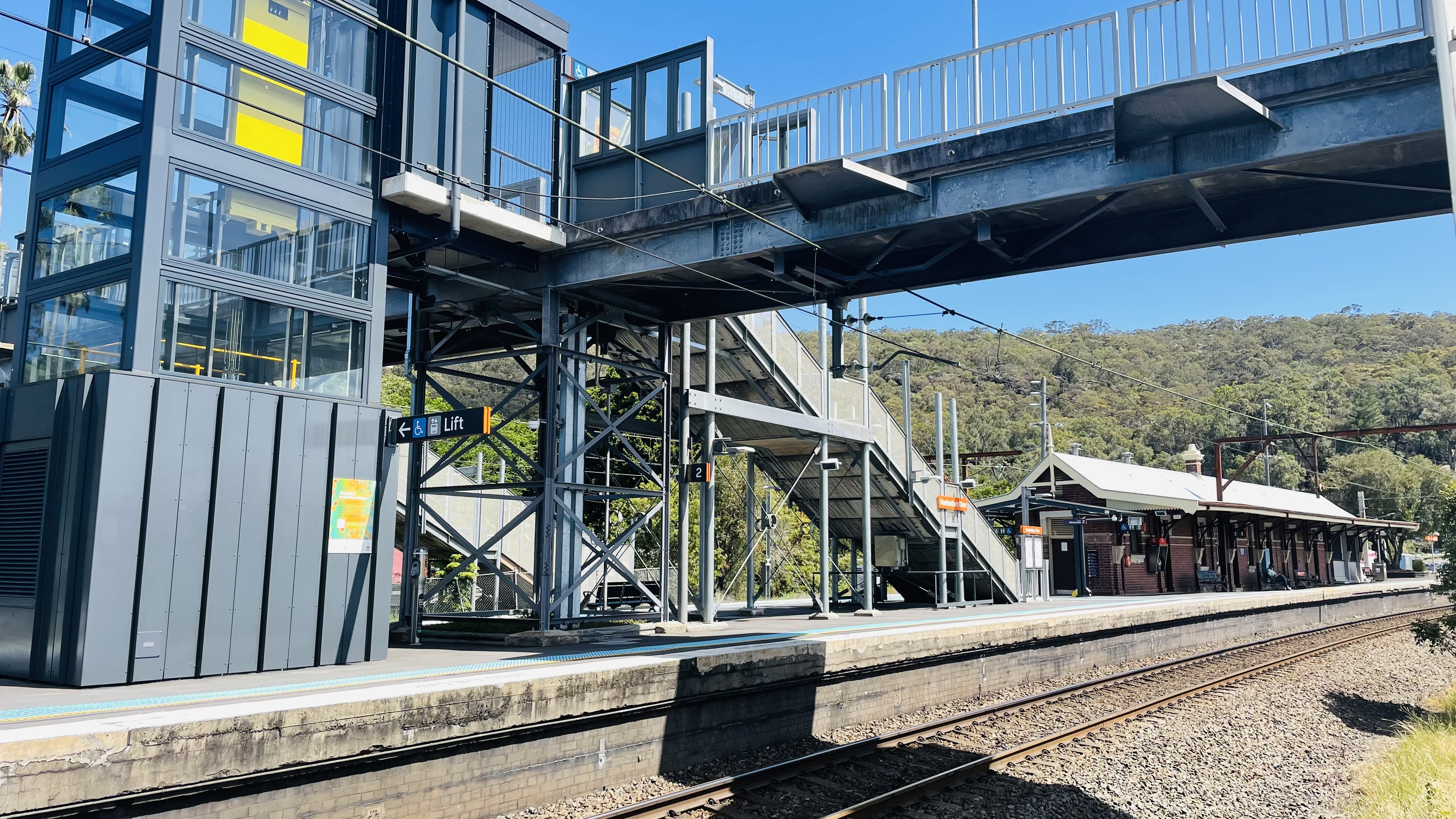
The footbridge and island platform

The Main Northern line between Sydney and Newcastle was constructed in two distinct stages and in the earliest years, was worked as two separate railway systems. The line between Sydney (actually the junction at Strathfield) and the Hawkesbury River was opened on 7 April 1887, with the terminus being on the southern bank of the Hawkesbury River. The line between Newcastle and the northern bank of the Hawkesbury River (near present-day Wondabyne) was opened in January 1888.

The line was completed through between Sydney and Newcastle with the opening of the Hawkesbury River Railway Bridge in 1889. The Hawkesbury River railway station is presently located on the Northern line between Cowan railway station and Wondabyne railway station.

The single-line section between Hornsby and the Hawkesbury River was opened for traffic on 7 April 1887. Separate side platforms were provided at the-then terminus, one for each of the future Up and Down lines in preparation for the forthcoming planned duplication of the Northern line. Completion of the bridge over the Hawkesbury River was still two years away and the station facilities provided at Hawkesbury River remained in use to serve as the railway terminus until the opening of the bridge. The construction name of Hawkesbury River was Flat Rock. The station was opened as Peats Ferry, renamed Brooklyn (1888), Hawkesbury River (1889), Hawkesbury (1890), finally reverting to Hawkesbury River in October 1906. Reflecting the confusion in the timetables, the station was known locally as Peats Ferry, Flat Rock, and Brooklyn in the early years, depending on whom one spoke to.

Whilst the main line terminated at Hawkesbury River, an arrangement of trackwork, sidings and platforms was provided on the causeway formed by reclaimed land on the eastern side of Long Island where the new Long Island tunnel had been constructed. The station was known as River Wharf and the tracks terminated at a wharf at the edge of the waterway. The purpose of the arrangement was to allow transhipment between the railways and river ferries, thus allowing passengers to cross the waterway, to another wharf on the northern side of the river, while the Hawkesbury River Bridge was under construction. Hawkesbury River became a popular destination for day trippers and fishermen, outstripping the capacity of the original timber platform building. This was replaced in 1903 with the current brick building, which is of the type that had recently been adopted as the standard construction for island platforms.

In the single line era, Hawkesbury River Station comprised two timber platforms, one for each of the Down main and Up main line. A timber station building was provided on the Up platform. By 1912, duplication was extended to Hawkesbury River and the layout had changed. An island platform and standard brick station building had been provided, refuge sidings, loops and goods sidings had been laid in, all controlled by interlocking and a signal box on the platform. A footbridge and stairs allowed access to the platform.

In subsequent years, increased rail traffic resulted in constant re-modelling, improvement and updating of railway facilities at Hawkesbury River to cater for bank engines (which assisted up trains from Hawkesbury River to Cowan) and longer and heavier trains. Signalling and interlocking was improved as a result.

Electrification of the Hornsby–Gosford section was opened in 1960. The first stage of the project was the electrification of the Hornsby to Hawkesbury River section and this was opened into Hawkesbury River on 12 April 1959. As part of this scheme, the platforms, overbridges, underbridge, footbridges and other structures were modified or rebuilt to accommodate the wide electric rollingstock, planned to operate between Hornsby and Cowan.

The station footbridge was raised for electrification. The electrification at Hawkesbury River saw the demise of steam locomotive bank engines, replaced by electric locomotives. As a result, modifications and improvements were carried out to trackwork, sidings and signalling to suit the use of electric locomotives and the future operation of stainless steel electric interurban car sets on passenger trains.

In the late 1980s and early 1990s, most station buildings on the northern line between Hornsby and Newcastle were further rebuilt with modern materials, a result of the extension of electrification from Gosford to Newcastle. However, the brick station building at Hawkesbury River is extant, although some additional awnings and structures have been added on the platform. The station steps have been rebuilt with modern materials. In 1987, the station featured in Jimmy Barnes' Music Video of his song 'I'm Still on Your Side' from his album Freight Train Heart. It also featured in episodes 885 and 886 of the soap opera Home and Away.

At Hawkesbury River, the signal box at the Hornsby-end of the station building was closed at the time of the upgrading, with all signals being controlled by a control centre at Hornsby.

A southbound passing loop exists to the east of the station. Immediately south of the station is the 8.6-kilometre (5.3 mi) Cowan Bank.

In February 2021, an upgrade with two new lifts was completed.

== River Wharf railway station ==
Associated with the Hawkesbury River railway station is the now defunct River Wharf railway station. This was located on the eastern end of Long Island, across the causeway linking Long Island with the mainland. During its operation, trains would disgorge passengers and goods here for transfer to the General Gordon paddle steamer.

They would then be transported out into Broken Bay and up to Woy Woy station from where they would rejoin a train for their onward journey north. This inconvenience was alleviated somewhat when the Woy Woy Tunnel was opened and the line extended south to a dead end named Mullet Creek, that was in the general vicinity of the present day Wondabyne station, in January 1889, as this meant the General Gordon only had to cross the Hawkesbury River and travel up Mullet Creek a few kilometres.

== Platforms and services ==
Hawkesbury River has one island platform with two faces. It is serviced by Sydney Trains Intercity Central Coast & Newcastle Line with services travelling between Sydney Central, Gosford, Wyong & Newcastle via Strathfield. There are 3 weekday morning peak hour services from Gosford to Sydney Central via Gordon.

Platform	Line	Stopping pattern	Notes
1	CCN	Services to Sydney Central via Strathfield	
1	CCN	3 Weekday morning peak hour services to Sydney Central via Gordon	
2	CCN	Services to Gosford, Wyong & Newcastle	

== Transport links ==
CDC NSW operates one bus route via Hawkesbury River station, under contract to Transport for NSW:

- 592: Hornsby station to Mooney Mooney

== Description ==
The complex comprises a type 11 station building, including a former signal box, erected in 1910; the platform, completed in 1887; a footbridge, completed in 1910; a wharf; a store room, completed in c. 1930; a water spout; and moveable heritage items.

Context

The Hawkesbury River Station is located at the north-western edge of Brooklyn immediately adjacent to the commercial strip and Brooklyn Marina. It is connected to Long Island to the north via a land bridge (containing rail line and road). It sits within a railway precinct that includes a range of railway workers accommodation to the south of the station on both sides of the line. The station commands impressive views of the Hawkesbury River to the east and west and Long Island to the north.

Station building including the formal signal box

The 1910 Hawkesbury River Station is an island station building, located between the Up and Down lines. It is a single-storey face brick building with a corrugated iron gable roof. On each platform is a large awning, supported on cast iron brackets, which are in turn supported on painted stone brackets, which are part of brick engaged piers of the station building. The station building features rendered detailing including cornices, architraves, string-courses and sill, some extant tuck-pointing, timber-framed double-hung sashed windows with the upper sashes retaining coloured glass panes. The building is circled by a concrete box drain with cast iron grate covering. Some of the doorsteps are standard concrete with metal foot scraper inserts. Attached to the southern end of the building is a former signal box with large sliding windows. The signal box has rendered external walls.

Internally, the building has painted plaster walls, painted joinery of a high quality and ceilings of ripple iron or fibrous plaster sheeting. The floors are all wooden. The waiting room retains its original fitted timber seating. The male and female lavatories retain their original configuration and timber partitions, with tiled finishes and fittings dating from c.1950. All of the office furniture and fittings as well as the ticket window are modern. There is evidence of a former fireplace in the former Station Master's office and an original cast iron safe. Some original four panel doors are extant.

Platform

The 1897 platform is located between the Up and Down lines and curves in a gentle crescent facing west. Some of the faces are face brick, particularly on the Down line, while the faces of the Up line are entirely modern and concrete. There is standard modern railway furniture, bins and fences on the platform. The Up platform has a WWII honour roll board and cast iron drinking fountain.

Footbridge

At the northern end of the platform there is a steel truss footbridge dating from the early 20th century, though somewhat modified with the addition of an upper half truss, steel beams and concrete deck and stairs (dating from the late 20th century). The footbridge goes from Brooklyn Road in the east, across the lines to the platform and the wharf.

Wharf

A small timber wharf sits on the western side of the station immediately north of the footbridge.

Store room

At the southern end of the platform is a single-storey, c. 1930s, brick building with a tiled gable roof. It is currently used for staff facilities.

Water spout

South of the platform between the Up line and siding is a water spout, originally used for the supply of water for steam locomotives. It is a cast iron structure on a concrete base with a timber platform and sheet metal spout, pivoting on a gear mechanism with a counter weight.

Moveable heritage

Moveable items include a World War II honour roll and cast iron drinking fountain on platforms, a collection of historic photographs in waiting room corridor, and an original cast iron safe in former Station Master's Office.

=== Condition ===
The station building including the former signal box is in very good condition. Also in very good condition are the platform and footbridge. The wharf is in very poor condition. The store room is in good condition and the water spout is in poor condition, rusted through on the spout.

The station group is intact and maintains its historic relationship with the Hawkesbury River setting, the Long Island Group, the current and former Hawkesbury River Rail Bridges and workers accommodation in Brooklyn township.

The station building is intact with most original fittings and fixtures. The footbridge has been raised to accommodate electric trains, but maintains its original steel support structure.

=== Modifications and dates ===
In 1960, electrification of the Hornsby-Gosford section of the line was completed. The station footbridge was raised, and modifications and improvements were carried out to trackwork, sidings and signalling to suit the use of electric locomotives and the future operation of stainless steel electric interurban car sets on passenger trains. The signal box was closed. In the late 1980s and early 1990s some additional awnings and structures have been added on the platform. The station steps have been rebuilt with modern materials.

== Heritage listing ==
Hawkesbury Railway Station has State significance. The station group has an outstanding degree of aesthetic significance. It has a particularly picturesque setting on the edge of the Hawkesbury, with views over the water to the east and west and to Long Island to the north. The station affords a view of the land bridge between Brooklyn and Long Island and the portals of the current and former Long Island tunnels, providing a rare opportunity to easily view some of the technical achievements of the Short North line construction. Its waterside setting is unusual and as such it is one of the most picturesque station settings in NSW.

Hawkesbury River Station has historical associations with the construction of the Short North line in the late 1880s and the Hawkesbury River Bridge in 1889, which was a major event and a significant engineering achievement in the history of NSW railways. The station facilitated the development of Brooklyn as a settlement for workers constructing the line and the station forms part of an extensive railway landscape of outstanding significance clustered around the Hawkesbury River, which includes the Long Island tunnels and maintenance depot, the current and former Hawkesbury River railway bridges and worker accommodation in Brooklyn township.

The platform building, island platform and footbridge are representative of structures built at Sydney railway stations between 1892 and 1929 and especially the period between 1909 and 1917. The station building is a good representative example of its type due to its high degree of intactness and integrity.

Hawkesbury River railway station was listed on the New South Wales State Heritage Register on 2 April 1999 having satisfied the following criteria.

The place is important in demonstrating the course, or pattern, of cultural or natural history in New South Wales.

The Hawkesbury River Railway Station was the terminus for the first section of the Short North from Strathfield for two years until the first Hawkesbury River bridge was completed in 1889. As such it has historic associations with the rail linkage of Sydney and Newcastle, which was a major event in the history of NSW railways. It forms part of a significant railway landscape including the Long Island Maintenance Depot, land bridge and tunnels, the current and former Hawkesbury River Rail bridges and railway worker accommodation in Brooklyn township.

The station facilitated the development of Brooklyn as a settlement for workers constructing the line. The associated housing (not owned by RailCorp) increases the significance of the Brooklyn Railway precinct, representing the provision of railway workers accommodation for construction and permanent ongoing operation of the railway, a practice that is no longer occurring.

Like many historic railway stations in NSW the station complex is able to evoke a former era of travel, communication and trade. This is heightened by the presence of a water spout at the southern end of the station from the former days of steam powered railway travel and the jetty, which forms an interface between transport on land and sea.

The place is important in demonstrating aesthetic characteristics and/or a high degree of creative or technical achievement in New South Wales.

The station is described in the NSW State Heritage Inventory as having an "outstanding degree of aesthetic significance. It has a particularly picturesque setting on the edge of the Hawkesbury, with views over the water to the east and west and to Long Island to the north. The station affords a view of the land bridge between Brooklyn and Long Island and the portals of the current and former Long Island tunnels, providing a rare opportunity to easily view some of the technical achievements of the Short North line construction. Its waterside setting is unusual and as such it is one of the most picturesque station settings in NSW."

The station building is an example of early twentieth century railway station design with fabric and details typical of this period and is similar to other rail buildings of the late nineteenth and early twentieth century in the Sydney region.

The place has a strong or special association with a particular community or cultural group in New South Wales for social, cultural or spiritual reasons.

The place has the potential to contribute to the local community's sense of place and can provide a connection to the local community's history.

The place possesses uncommon, rare or endangered aspects of the cultural or natural history of New South Wales.

The Hawkesbury River station complex is a common station Type 11 (standard A8-10), well represented elsewhere in the Sydney metro network. Its waterside setting is however rare, providing one of the most picturesque station settings in NSW.

The station group also forms part of an unusual late nineteenth and early twentieth century railway landscape of outstanding significance clustered around the Hawkesbury River, which includes the Long Island tunnels and maintenance depot, the current and former Hawkesbury River railway bridges and worker accommodation in Brooklyn township.

The place is important in demonstrating the principal characteristics of a class of cultural or natural places/environments in New South Wales.

The platform building, island platform and footbridge are representative of structures built at Sydney railway stations between 1892 and 1929 and especially the period between 1909 and 1917. The station building is a good representative example of Type A8-10 stations due to its high degree of intactness and integrity.

== See also ==
- List of regional railway stations in New South Wales
- Hawkesbury River
