= Cowan railway station =

Railway station in Sydney, New South Wales, Australia

Cowan
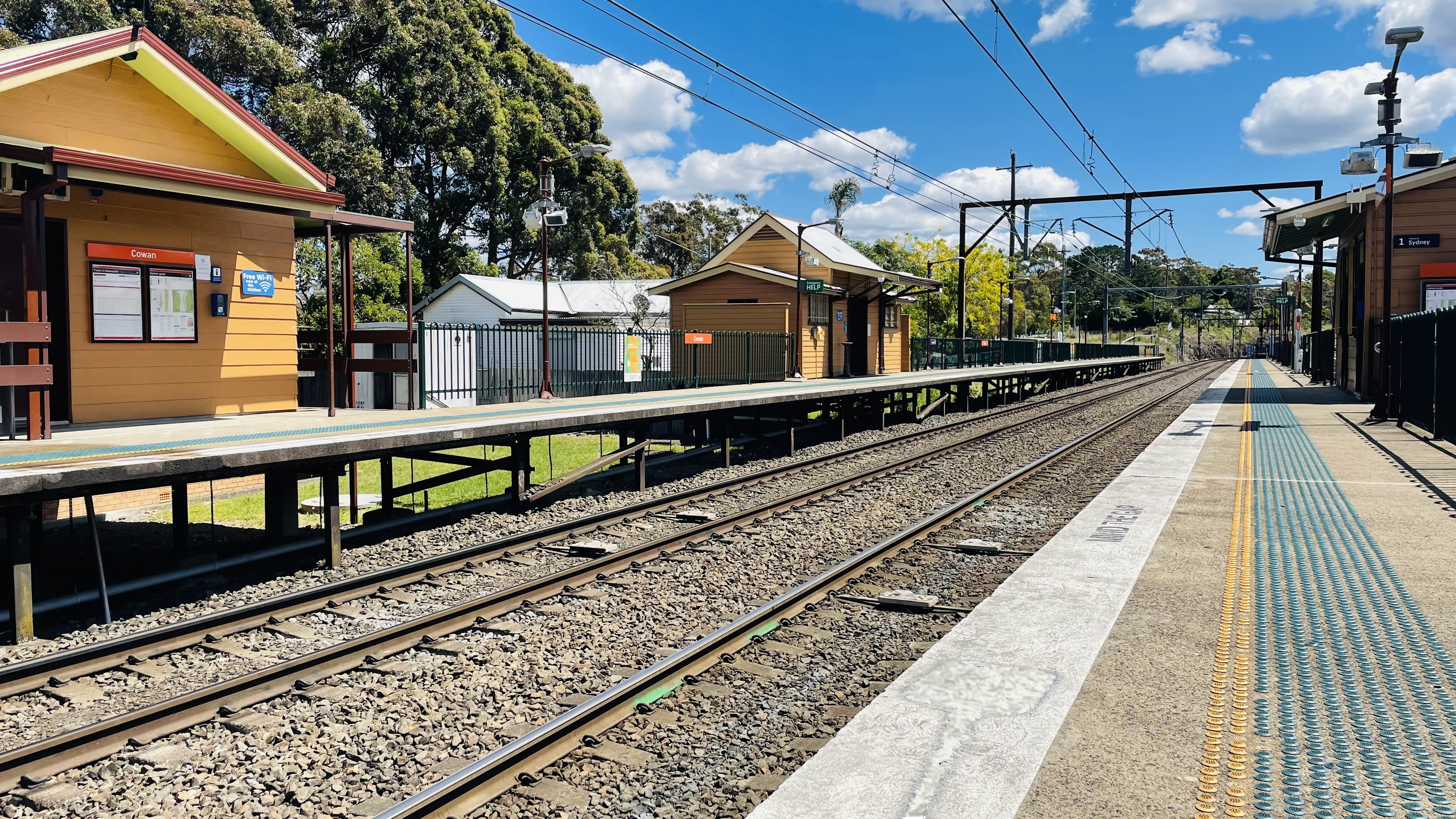
- Northbound view from Platform 1, November 2022

General information
- Location: Old Pacific Highway, Cowan, New South Wales; Australia
- Coordinates: 33°35′35″S 151°10′17″E
- Elevation: 191 m (627 ft)
- Owner: Transport Asset Manager of New South Wales
- Operator: Sydney Trains
- Line: Main North
- Distance: 48.81 km (30.33 mi) from Central
- Platforms: 2 (2 side)
- Tracks: 3
- Connections: Bus

Construction
- Structure type: Ground

Other information
- Station code: CWN
- Website: Transport for NSW

History
- Opened: 1890; 136 years ago

Passengers
- 2025: 28,958 (year); 79 (daily) (Sydney Trains, NSW TrainLink)

Services
Preceding station	Intercity Trains	Following station
Hawkesbury River towards Newcastle Interchange	Central Coast & Newcastle Line	Berowra towards Central
Location

Cowan railway station is an intercity railway station located on the Main North line, serving the Northern Sydney suburb of Cowan. It is served by Sydney Trains intercity Central Coast & Newcastle Line services.

== History ==
Cowan station was opened in 1890. The station was a terminating point for CityRail suburban services until January 1992 when all services were curtailed to Berowra. A southbound passing loop is located immediately south of the station. In February 1999, it was extended south 1.1 kilometres (1 mi) to allow 1.5-kilometre (1 mi) freight trains to stable. North of the station the 8.6-kilometre (5 mi) Cowan Bank commences its descent to Hawkesbury River station and thereafter, crossing the Hawkesbury River.

== Platforms and services ==
Cowan has two side platforms. It is serviced by Sydney Trains Intercity Central Coast & Newcastle Line with services travelling between Sydney Central, Gosford, Wyong & Newcastle via Strathfield. There are 3 weekday morning peak hour services from Gosford to Sydney Central via Gordon.

Platform	Line	Stopping pattern	Notes
1	CCN	Services to Sydney Central via Strathfield	
1	CCN	3 Weekday morning peak hour services to Sydney Central via Gordon	
2	CCN	Services to Gosford, Wyong & Newcastle	

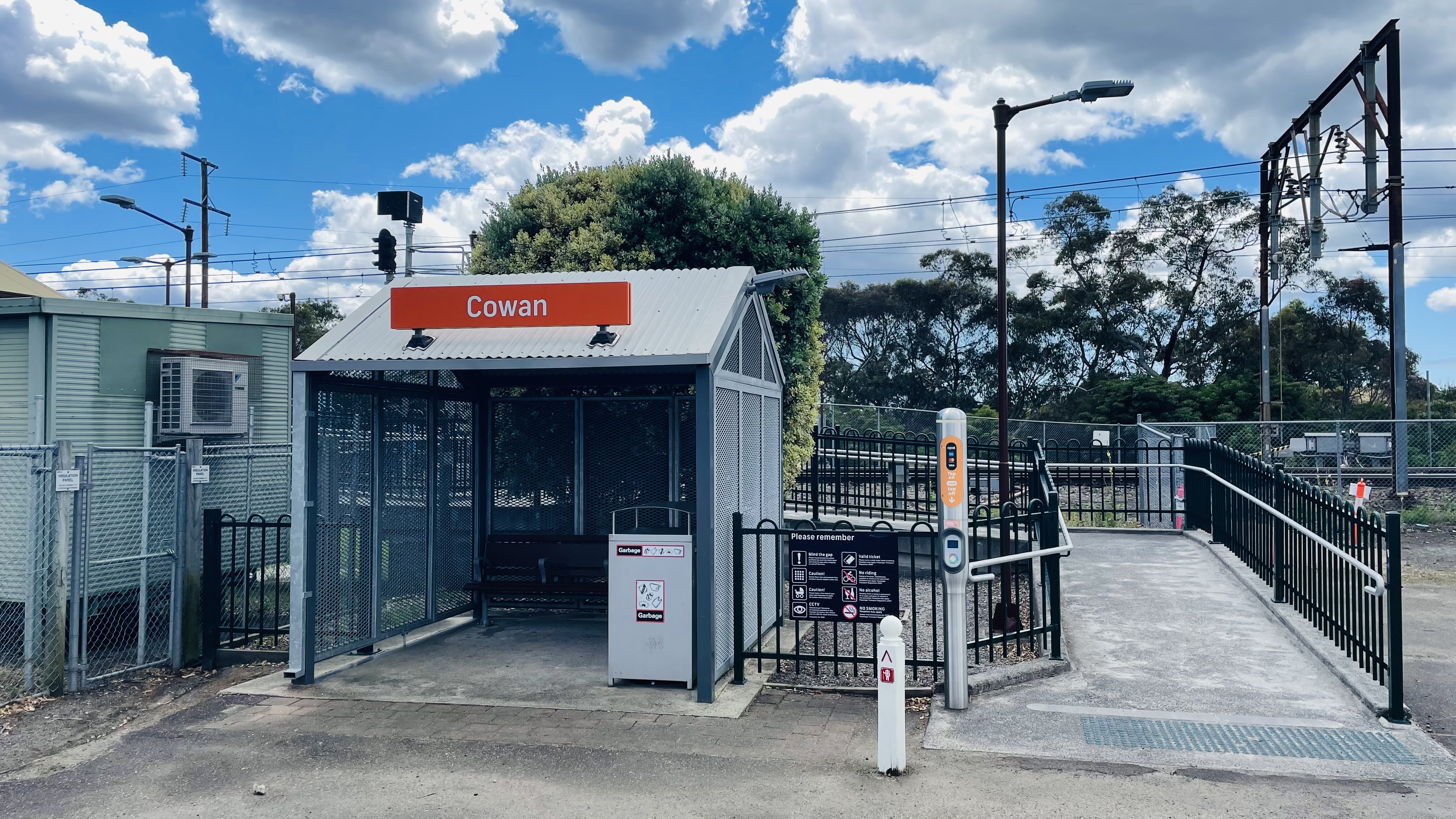
Entrance from Carpark on Pacific Highway

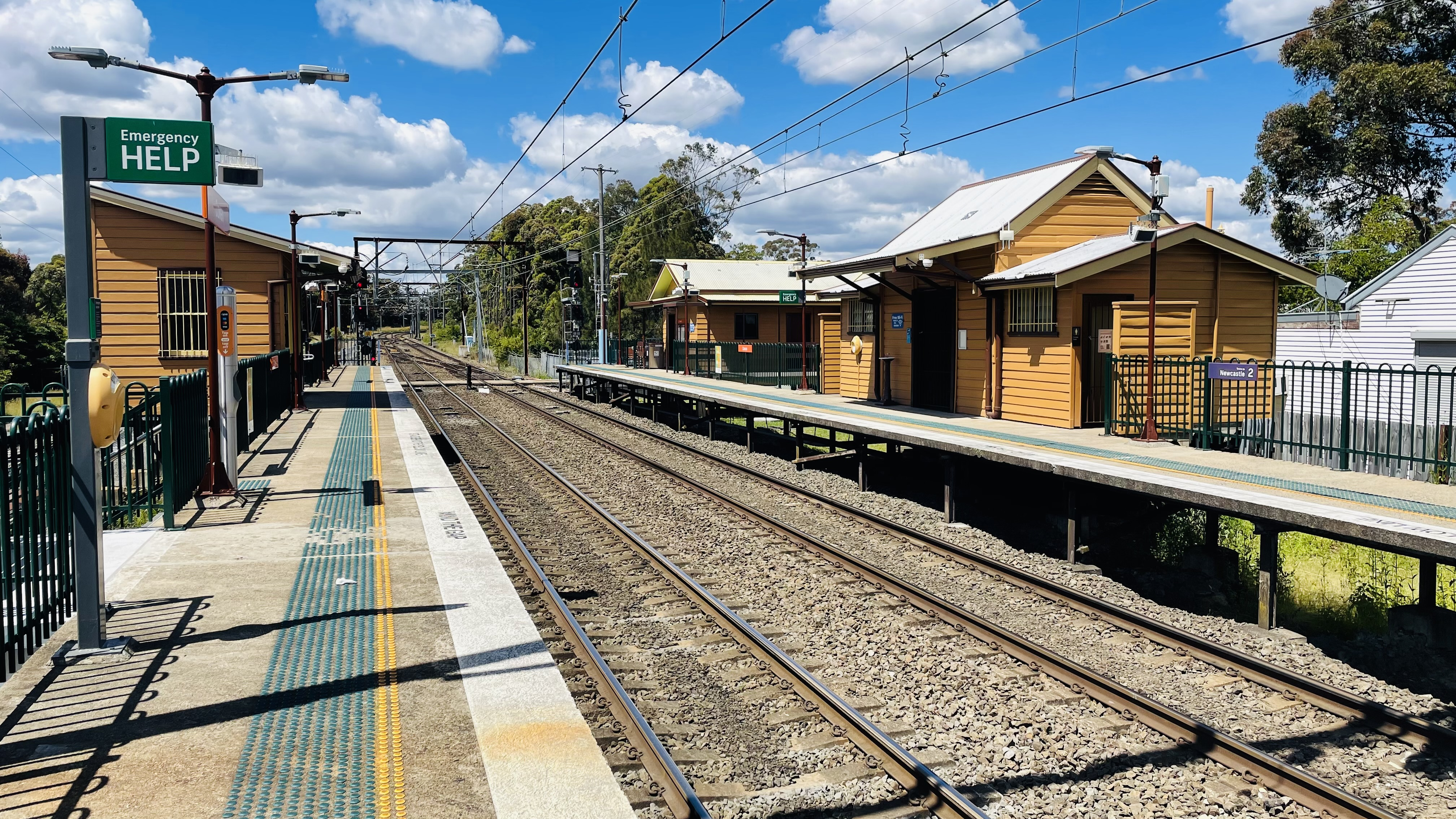
Southbound view from Platform 1

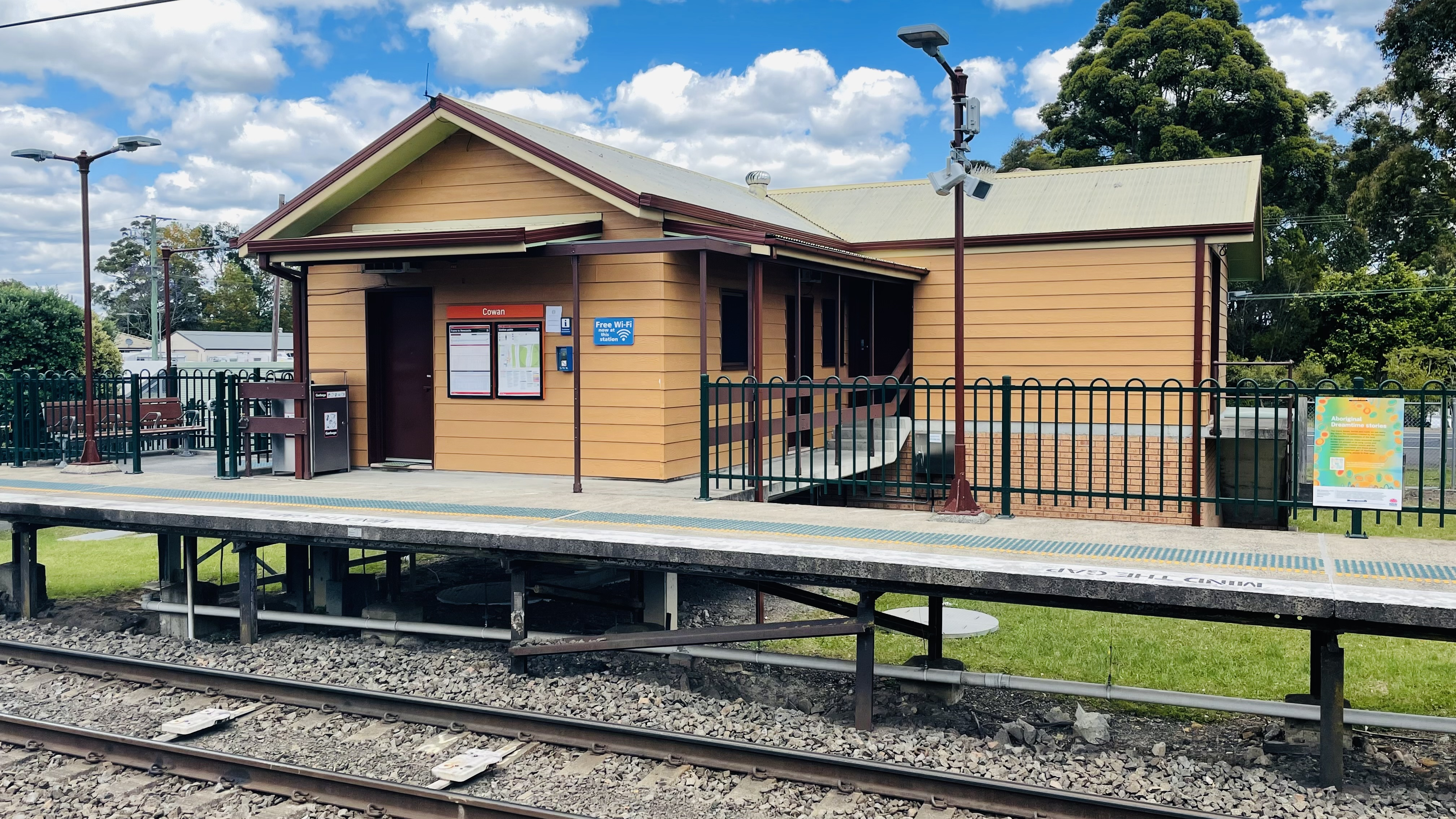
Station building on Platform 2

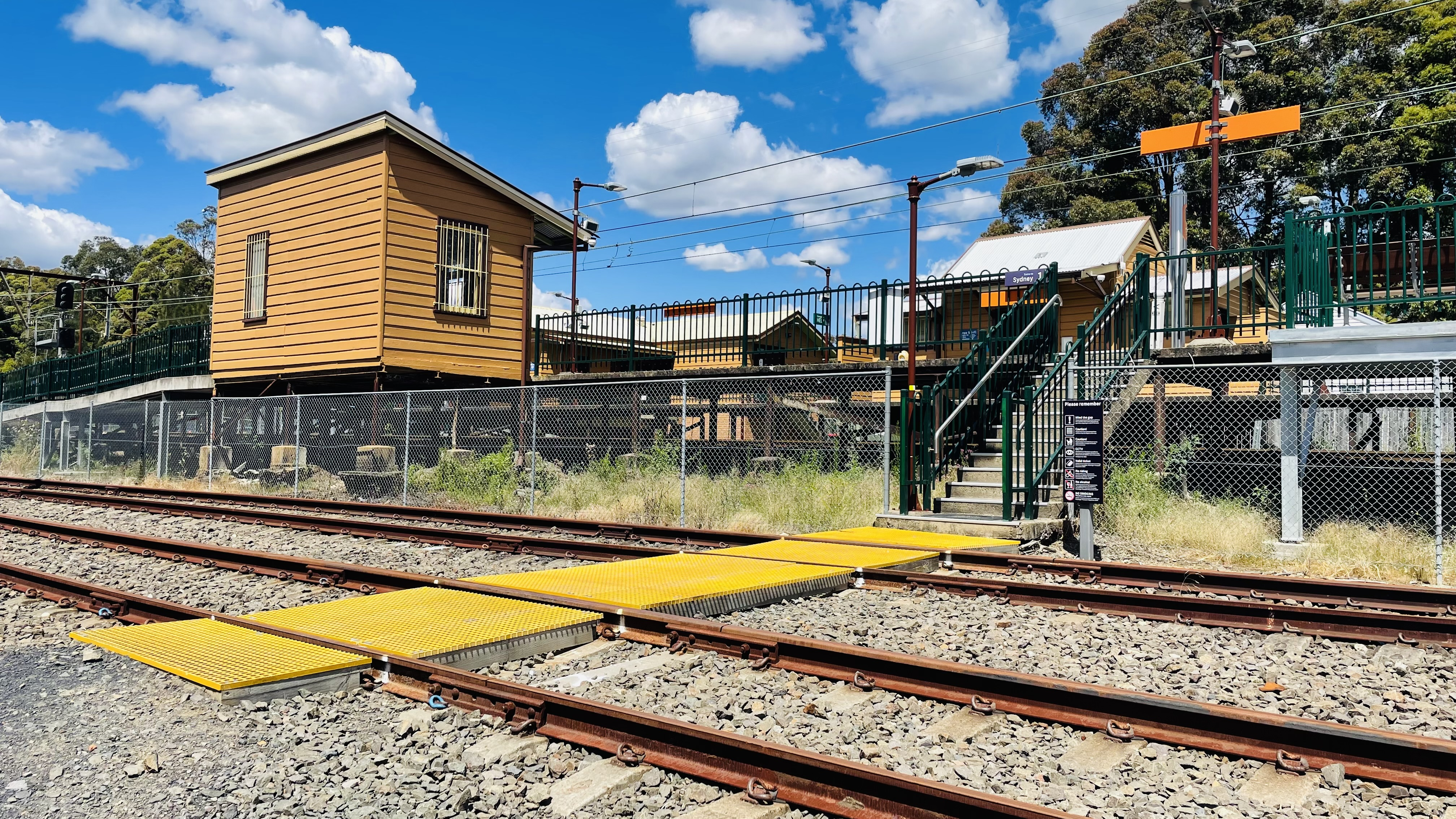
Entrance from Great North Walk

== Transport links ==
CDC NSW operates one bus route via Cowan station, under contract to Transport for NSW:

- 592: Hornsby station to Mooney Mooney

== Trackplan ==
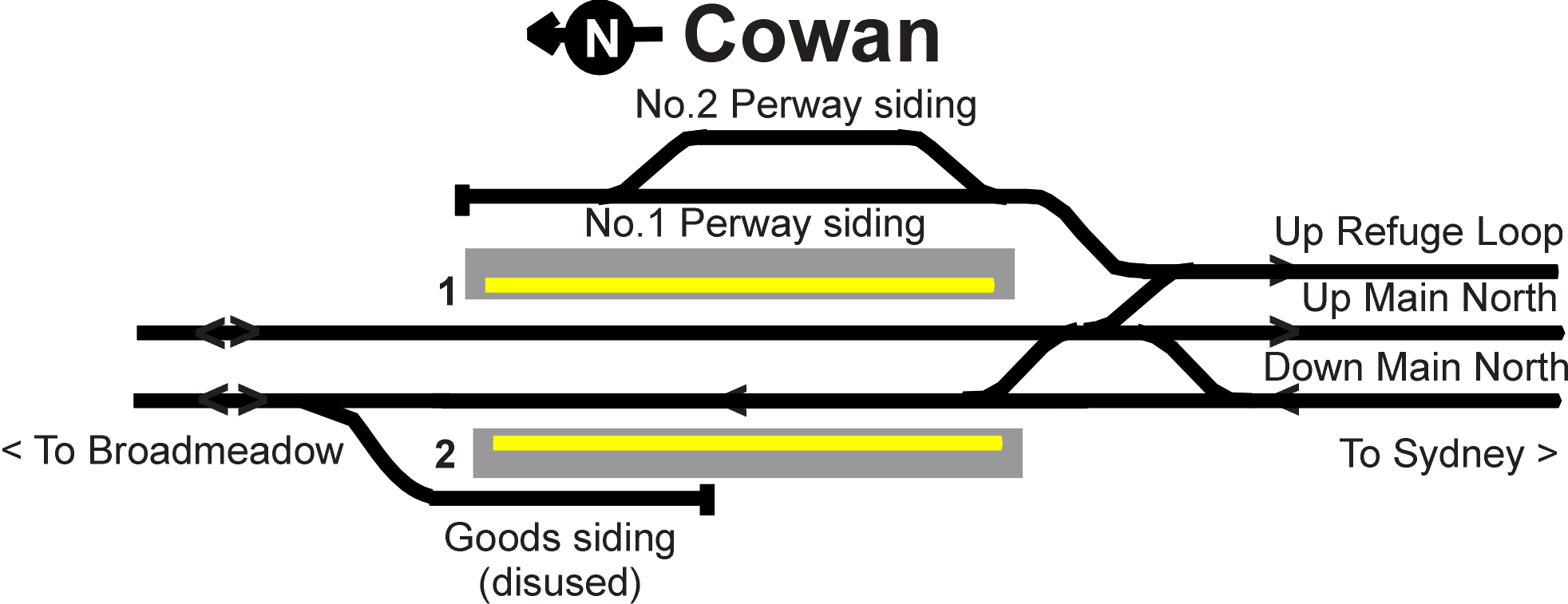
Track layout at Cowan

== See also ==
- List of NSW TrainLink railway stations
