= Cowan Bank =

Rail line in New South Wales, Australia

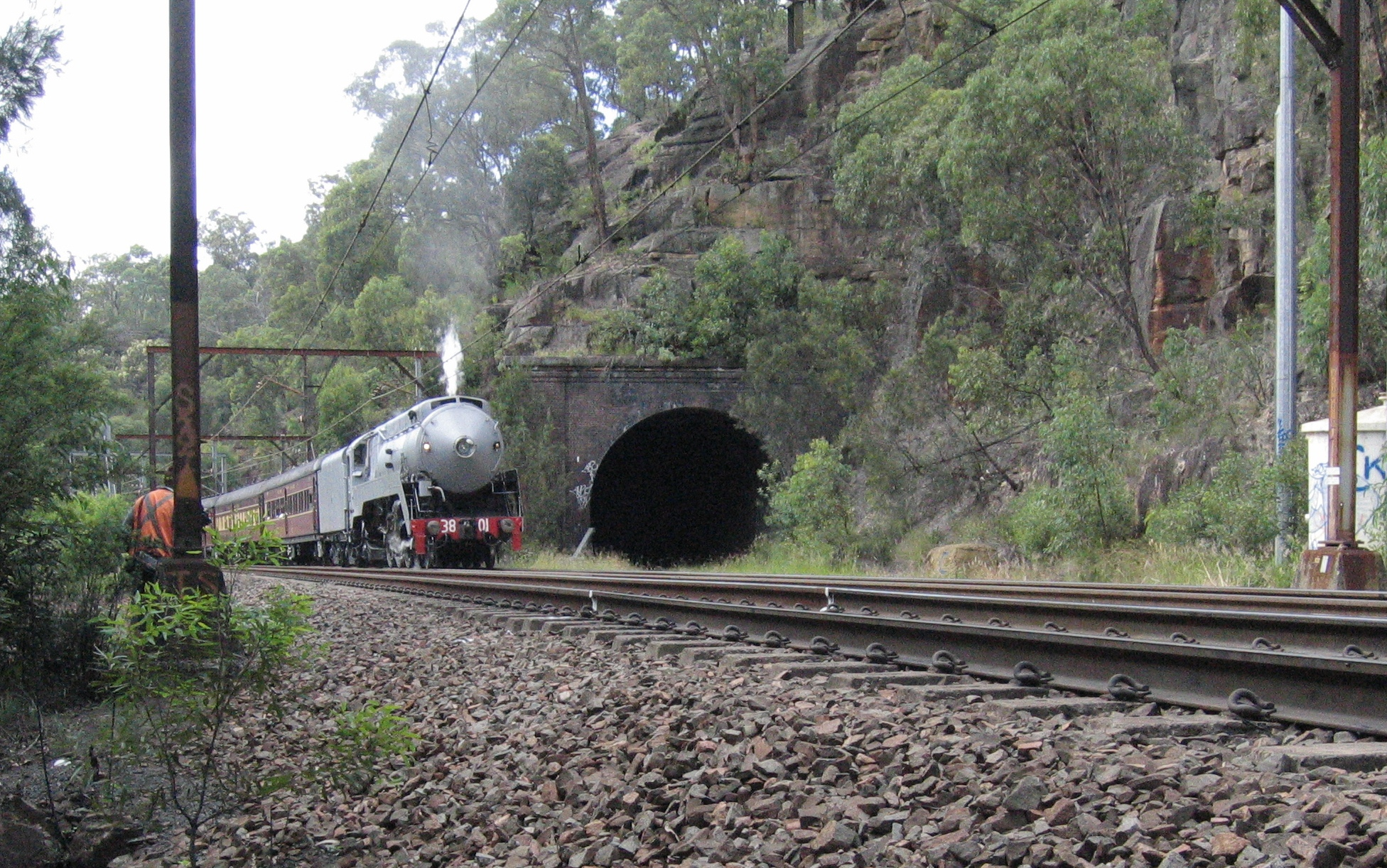
- 3801 hauls a train past the southern entrance of the abandoned Boronia No 5 tunnel in 2006
- Interactive map of Cowan Bank

Overview
- Line: Main North line
- Coordinates: 33°34′04″S 151°11′57″E
- System: Sydney Trains
- Crosses: Old Pacific Highway; Pacific Motorway; Ku-ring-gai Chase National Park
- Start: Cowan station (south)
- End: Hawkesbury River station (north)

Operation
- Owner: Transport Asset Manager of New South Wales

Technical
- Length: 5 tunnels (1 since disused) of varying lengths
- Track length: 8.6 kilometres (5 mi)
- No. of tracks: 2
- Track gauge: 1,435 mm (4 ft 8 1/2 in) standard gauge
- Electrified: 1959
- Max elevation: 200 metres (660 ft) AHD
- Min elevation: Sea level
- Grade: 1:40
Cowan Bank
- † Diagram not to scale

Cowan Bank is an 8.6-kilometre (5 mi) double-track section of the standard gauge Main North line in New South Wales, Australia. It starts at Cowan station, 48.8 kilometres (30 mi) north of Sydney Central, descending from 200 metres (656 ft) AHD to sea level at Hawkesbury River station. It has an average grade of 2.5% (1 in 40).

== Overview ==
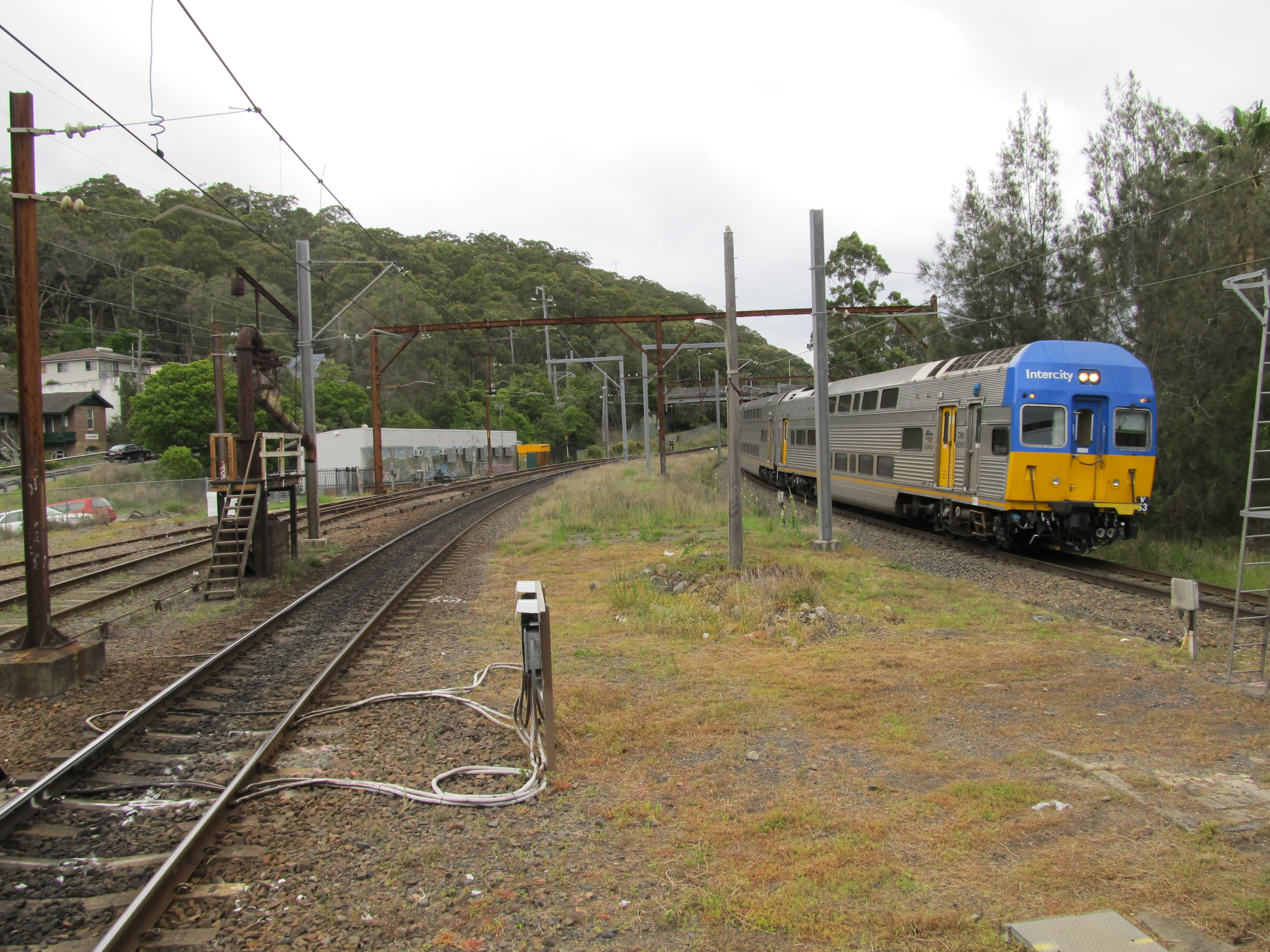
V set approaching Hawkesbury River station after descending Cowan Bank in October 2011

Cowan Bank has five tunnels (of which four are still in use), one level crossing (for track work road vehicles only) situated between Boronia #2 and #3 tunnels, and two road bridges. The line crosses under the Pacific Highway twice, once using a road bridge near Cowan station and again while passing through Boronia #1 tunnel. It crosses under the Sydney–Newcastle Freeway while passing through Boronia #2 tunnel. The line was built through very rugged and heavily forested terrain on the western edge of the Ku-ring-gai Chase National Park. Because of its isolated location there are very few places from where the track can be observed – sections of the Pacific Highway on the ridge between Cowan and the Hawkesbury River provide a few vantage points.

Bank engines were attached to the rear of trains at Hawkesbury River station to assist them in the climb and were detached at Cowan station. After assisting a train up the bank, the bank engine would usually return to Hawkesbury River station to await the next train. Bank engines are no longer used on the line.

Because of its long grade and proximity to locomotive manufacturing and maintenance facilities in both Sydney and Newcastle, Cowan Bank is often used to test locomotives and power cars.

== Line history ==
=== Construction ===
The single track line between Cowan and Hawkesbury River stations was completed in 1887. Five tunnels (Boronia #1 to Boronia #5) were built as double track tunnels but initially only a single track was laid through them. The line was duplicated in stages between 1907 and 1909. The duplication work required major rock excavations as the permanent way was set back further into the hillside. This excellent sandstone fill was put to good use by realigning the track to ease four of the sharp 11 chain curves to standard 12 chain curves, resulting in Boronia #5 tunnel being bypassed and abandoned.

In 1912, a relief line was opened between the #2 and #3 tunnels, but the steep grade caused numerous problems including stalled trains, damaged engines and breakaways, and it was soon relegated to storage for disabled trains or portions of trains. The relief line was finally removed in 1934, thus providing room on the formation for further improvements to the alignment for the two main lines some years later.

The track loading gauge (maximum allowed width of carriages) has been progressively increased, with subsequent widening of the tunnels, between 1910 and 1973. The line was electrified in 1959.

Bi-directional running was introduced in October 1996 to allow faster up trains to use the adjacent down track to overtake slower freight trains climbing the bank. Track cross-overs were installed at Cowan railway station, between Boronia #1 and #2 tunnels, and just south of Hawkesbury River railway station.

=== Accidents ===
Five serious incidents have occurred to date on Cowan Bank:

1. 21 June 1887 – an excursion train from Sydney ran out of control down the bank and collided with freight wagons stored on a siding at Hawkesbury River station. 6 fatalities and 70 injured.
2. 20 January 1944 – a local road bus stalled on the level crossing at Brooklyn Road and was hit by the north bound Kempsey mail train. 17 fatalities.
3. 9 June 1948 – a rear-end collision between the stationary Newcastle Flyer bound for Sydney, which had stalled on the bank, and the following Cessnock Express. 43 passengers were injured.
4. 6 November 1974 – a side collision between a Public Transport Commission V set and a passing freight train. No injuries.
5. 6 May 1990 – a rear-end collision between a stationary passenger excursion train bound for Sydney hauled by historic steam locomotive 3801, which had stalled between Boronia #2 and #3 tunnels, and a following Sydney bound CityRail V set There were 6 fatalities, including the driver of the Intercity electric train, and 99 injured.
