= Cockatoo Island Dockyard =

Australian dockyard

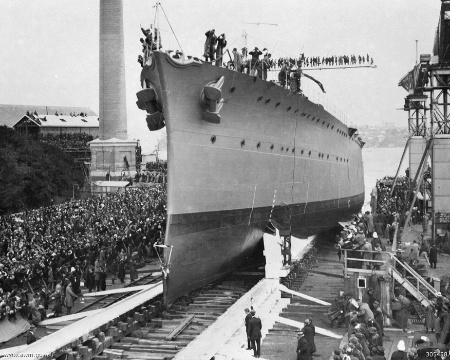
The light cruiser HMAS Adelaide being launched at Cockatoo Island Dockyard in 1918

The Cockatoo Island Dockyard was a major dockyard in Sydney, Australia, based on Cockatoo Island. The dockyard was established in 1857 to maintain Royal Navy warships. It later built and repaired military and battle ships, and played a key role in sustaining the Royal Australian Navy. The dockyard was closed in 1991, and its remnants are heritage listed as the Cockatoo Island Industrial Conservation Area.

== Colonial ownership ==
It was established by the colonial Government of New South Wales, commencing operations in December 1857 with the opening of Fitzroy Dock. Planning had begun as early as May 1846, when Governor George Gipps had recommended the construction of a dry dock at Cockatoo Island to the British government to service Royal Navy vessels. Construction had begun in 1851, with Captain Gother Mann as engineer-in-chief, and taken six years. It was known as the Government Dockyard – Biloela while in colonial control. Shipbuilding facilities, such as slipways and workshops, were also established, and the dockyard produced small vessels for the colonial government, in addition to its role servicing British government vessels. It was initially administered by the superintendent of the adjacent prison, but was operated by the Department of Harbours and Rivers from 1864. The main machine workshop was upgraded in the same year.

Fitzroy Dock was lengthened from 284 feet (86.6 m) to 400 feet (121.9 m) c. 1870, and extended for a second and final time to 475 feet (144.8 m) in 1880. Numerous buildings were added to the site during the 1880s, including a Pump House, stores and accommodation for new machinery.

It became apparent as early as 1870 that a larger dock would be needed due to the increasing size of ships, and Sutherland Dock was built from 1882 to 1890 at a cost of £267,825. Sutherland Dock, at 635 feet (193.5 m) long and 84 feet (25.6 m) wide, was said to be the largest dock in the world at completion. Its size allowed it to cater to the larger Royal Navy vessels.

Facilities at the shipyard were expanded significantly in the 1890s following the opening of Sutherland Dock, taking up a larger proportion of Cockatoo Island. Although the Federation of Australia took place in 1901, the New South Wales government remained in ownership of the dockyard. The dockyard was again extensively upgraded between 1904 and 1908, with the construction of a steel foundry, extension of existing workshops, construction of two new slipways, and additional steel-working facilities and cantilevered cranes.

The Royal Australian Navy was established in 1911. HMAS Warrego, initially built in Glasgow but dismantled, shipped to Australia and reassembled at Cockatoo Island, became the first Australian naval vessel built there. It was still in New South Wales ownership at the time. Sutherland Dock was widened in 1911, and the biggest slipway on the dockyard, Slipway No. 1, was built in 1912, as well as a plate shop.

== Commonwealth ownership ==
The Commonwealth then purchased the Cockatoo Island Dockyard from the New South Wales Government, with the transfer taking place from 31 January 1913, although the formal agreement was not signed until 1915. The Commonwealth paid £867,716.19 for the dockyard. It was then renamed the Commonwealth Naval Dockyard, Cockatoo Island. It built many ships for both naval and civilian purposes in Commonwealth ownership.

World War I saw an increase in work for the shipyard, which had built over 50 ships and repaired or converted more than 150 by the end of the war. It fitted out transports capable of conveying over 120,000 officers and men and 17,000 horses, and handled nearly 2,000 dockings. Many new facilities were established to accommodate the increased need, including a cruiser wharf, new bolt workshop, brass foundry, ship fitting workshop, coppersmith's workshop, timber store, electrical workshop, tool room and store, electrical workshop, plater's shed, and a new power station and sail loft.

The workforce reached a peak during December 1919, at which time 4085 people were employed at the dockyard.

A Royal Commission into the future of Garden Island and Cockatoo Island was held between 1919 and 1921. It recommended that Cockatoo Island cease shipbuilding activities, but continue to function as a maintenance and repair facility. This did not take place, but in September 1923 the dockyard was transferred from the Navy to the Australian Commonwealth Shipping Board, and began operating on a commercial basis in addition to its naval work. However, a November 1927 High Court ruling held that the government could not compete for open contracts against private enterprise, resulting in the loss of a major contract for the Bunnerong Power Station. A further economic downturn in 1928 further affected dockyard work, and the impact of the Great Depression saw workers decrease from 1,300 in 1928 to 560 in 1932.

== Cockatoo Docks & Engineering Company ==
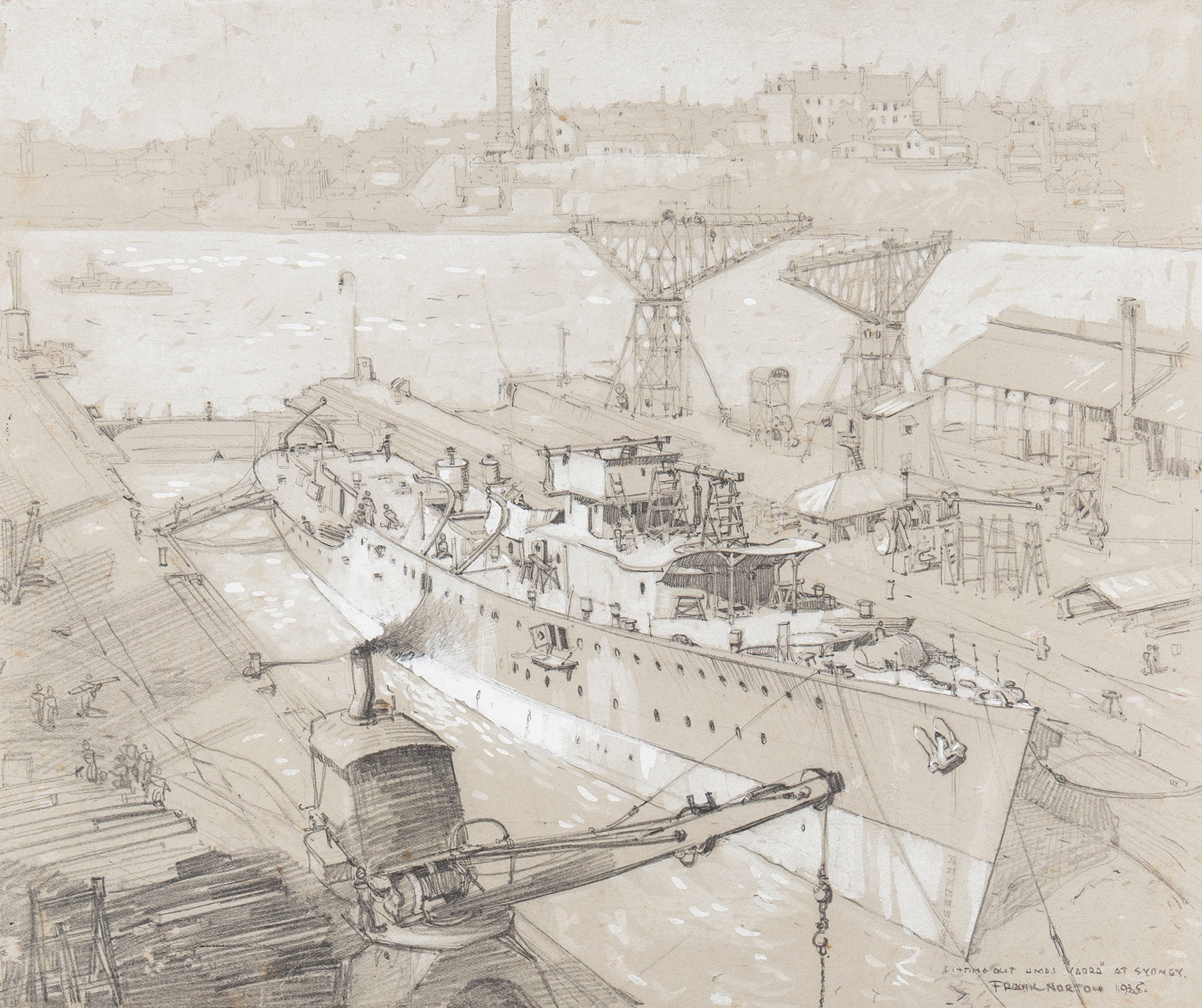
Fitting Out H.M.A.S. Yarra at Sydney (1935) by Frank Norton

In 1935, following a period where the dockyard struggled financially, it was leased to a private company, the Cockatoo Docks & Engineering Company. The lease allowed the dockyard to take on various heavy industrial projects outside of shipbuilding, and although priority remained with naval work under the owners' agreement with the government, to conduct substantial commercial shipping work. The new heavy engineering aspect saw it also building machinery for mines and dams, later to include the Snowy Mountains Scheme.

The shipyard again saw a substantial increase in work during World War II. It was the main ship repair base in the South Pacific for a period following the Fall of Singapore. 19 new ships were built and major repairs undertaken on 40 Allied warships. Over £400,000 was spent on upgrades during the war, including a new turbine shop, brass foundry, plater's shed, welding workshop and slipway. The construction of the turbine shop and foundry had required extensive excavation of the cliff face, with the excavated rock then used to reclaim land for further facilities. A new motor transport system was also instigated during the war. Following the war, the shipyard then engaged in refitting naval vessels for commercial service.

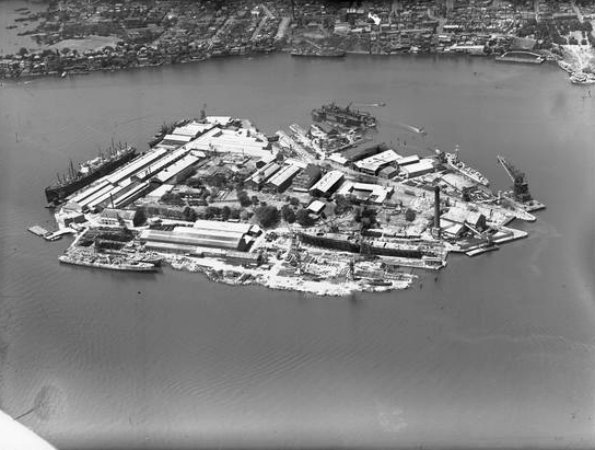
Cockatoo Island, 1951

In 1947, Vickers Limited gained the majority of shares in the Cockatoo Docks & Engineering Company, and Vickers Cockatoo Docks and Engineering Pty Ltd, formed in 1948, would formally operate the dockyard for the remainder of its existence.

The old Sutherland Wharf was upgraded between c. 1962 and 1965, and a new Sutherland Wharf built in 1971, with new submarine refit facilities opened in the same year.

The last major commercial contract undertaken by the dockyard was MS Empress of Australia, completed in 1965.

A new agreement in 1972 meant that Cockatoo Island no longer had preferential treatment for Commonwealth work except submarines, which thereafter became a significant portion of the dockyard's business. The dockyard unsuccessfully tendered for several large naval shipbuilding projects following the new agreement.

The ownership of Vickers Cockatoo Dockyard Pty Ltd was transferred to a new company, Vickers Australia Pty Ltd, in 1978. It merged with the Commonwealth Steel Company to form Comsteel Vickers in 1984, and the combined company was sold to Australian National Industries in 1986.

The last ship to be built at the dockyard was HMAS Success, then the largest naval vessel built in Australia, which launched on 3 March 1984.

== Laid down marine vessels ==
Marine vessels laid down at the Cockatoo Island Dockyard include:

- HMAS Adelaide, Town-class cruiser, built between 1917 and 1922
- HMAS Albatross, seaplane tender, built between 1926 and 1928
- HMAS Arunta, Tribal-class destroyer, built between 1938 and 1942
- HMAS Barcoo, River-class frigate, built between 1942 and 1946
- HMAS Bataan, Tribal-class destroyer, built between 1938 and 1942
- HMAS Bathurst, Bathurst-class corvette, built between 1940 and 1942
- HMAS Bendigo, Bathurst-class corvette, built between 1940 and 1942
- HMAS Biloela, fleet collier, built between 1918 and 1919
- HMAS Brisbane, Town-class cruiser, built between 1913 and 1916
- HMAS Cape Leeuwin, lighthouse tender, built between 1924 and 1925
- CLS-4 Carpentaria, lightship, built between 1916 and 1917
- MS Empress of Australia, ferry, built between 1962 and 1965
- HMAS Glenelg, Bathurst-class corvette, built between 1940 and 1942
- HMAS Goulburn, Bathurst-class corvette, built between 1940 and 1942
- HMAS Huon, River-class torpedo-boat destroyer, first steel warship built completely in Australia, built between 1912 and 1916
- HMAS J1, J-class submarine, refit between 1919 and 1920
- HMAS Kangaroo, Bar-class boom defence vessel, built between 1938 and 1941
- HMAS Karangi, Bar-class boom defence vessel, built between 1938 and 1941
- HMAS Koala, Bar-class boom defence vessel, built between 1938 and 1941
- HMAS Kookaburra, Net-class boom defence vessel, built between 1938 and 1941
- HMAS Mombah, coal lighter and stores ship, built between 1920 and 1923
- HMAS Parramatta, River-class destroyer escort, built between 1951 and 1963
- HMAS Parramatta, grimsby-class sloop, built between 1938 and 1940
- HMAS Queenborough, Q-class destroyer, refit between 1950 and 1954
- HMAS Stalwart, escort maintenance ship, built between 1964 and 1968
- HMAS Stuart, River-class destroyer escort, built between 1959 and 1961
- HMAS Success, Durance-class tanker, built between 1979 and 1986
- HMAS Swan, grimsby-class sloop, built between 1934 and 1936
- HMAS Swan, River-class torpedo-boat destroyer, built between 1912 and 1916
- Titan, floating crane, fabricated in Carlisle in the United Kingdom and assembled at Cockatoo Island Dockyard between 1916 and 1919
- HMAS Tobruk, battle-class destroyer, built between 1944 and 1950
- HMAS Torrens, River-class destroyer escort, built between 1964 and 1971
- HMAS Torrens, River-class torpedo-boat destroyer, built between 1912 and 1916
- HMAS Voyager, Daring-class destroyer, built between 1946 and 1959
- HMAS Vampire, Daring-class destroyer, built between 1946 and 1959
- HMAS Vigilant, auxiliary patrol boat (a.k.a. HMAS Sleuth and HMAS Hawk), first ship built with an aluminum structure in Australia, built between 1937 and 1938
- Waratah, tugboat (a.k.a. Burunda), built between 1900 and 1903
- HMAS Waree, tugboat, built between 1938 and 1939
- HMAS Warramunga, Tribal-class destroyer, built between 1938 and 1942
- HMAS Warrego, grimsby-class sloop, built between 1938 and 1940
- HMAS Warrego, River-class torpedo-boat destroyer, fabricated in Scotland and reassembled at Cockatoo Island Dockyard between 1911 and 1912
- Wattle, steam tug, built between 1933 and 1934
- HMAS Yarra, grimsby-class sloop, built between 1934 and 1936
- Yelta, steam tug, built between 1947 and 1949

== Closure ==
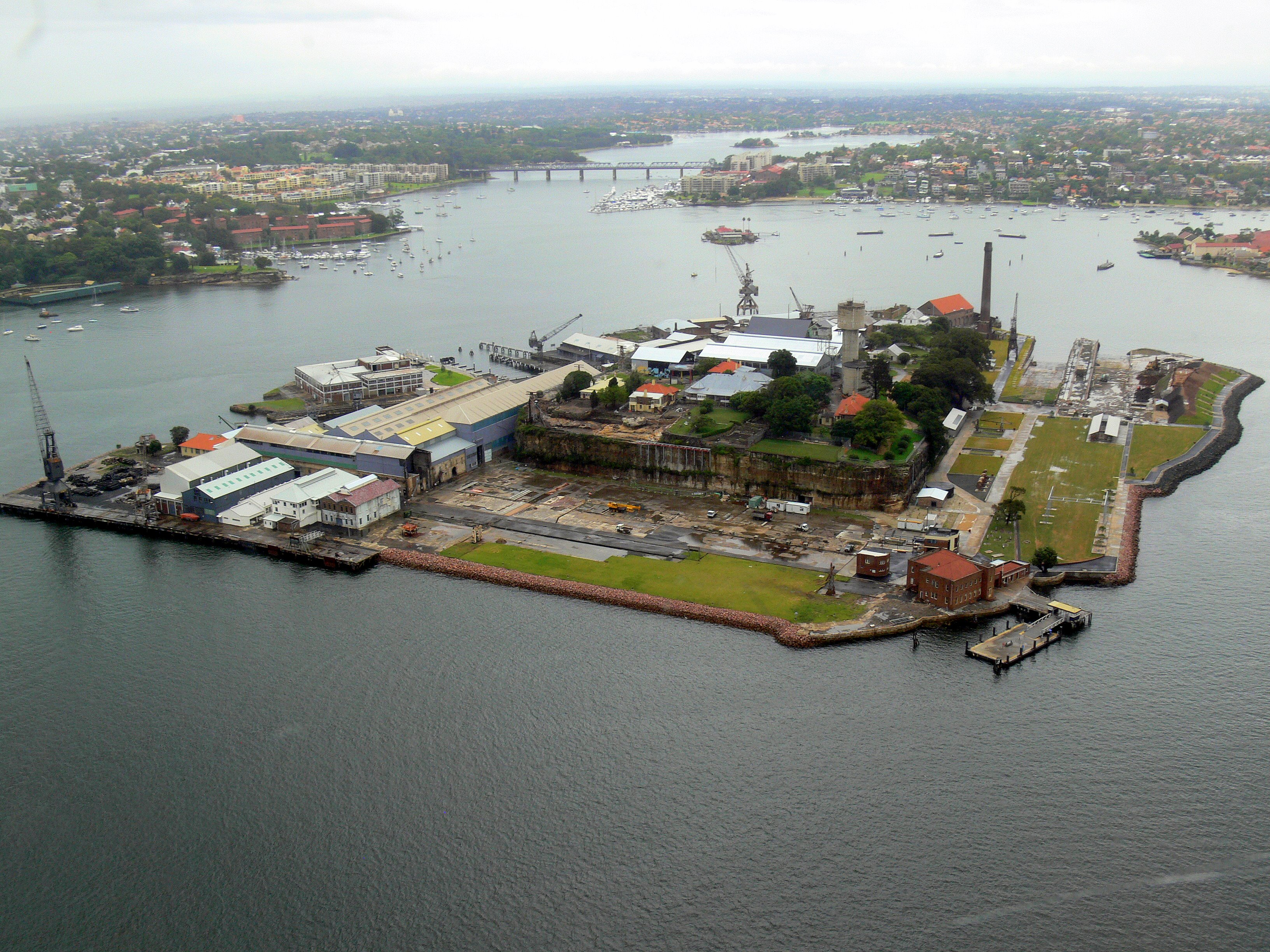
Cockatoo Island, 2008

By the 1980s, much of the dockyard's machinery was obsolete and it was in need of a major and expensive upgrade were it to continue in operation. In 1987, the dockyard was listed as an asset to be sold following a review of defence facilities. The Commonwealth government announced that the dockyard lease would not be renewed beyond 1 January 1993, and that the island would be sold. New contracts in negotiation were largely cancelled, and operations thereafter largely focused on completing existing contracts. The last submarine to be refitted at Cockatoo Island was HMAS Orion, handed back to the government on 4 June 1991. The dockyard was decommissioned on 31 December 1991.

Many buildings and wharves were demolished following the closure of the site; however, the remainder of the site is now heritage-listed.

== See also ==
- Naval Base Sydney
