= Cockatoo Docks & Engineering Company =

1933–1992 company in Sydney, New South Wales, Australia

- Industry: Ship building
- Founded: 1 March 1933
- Defunct: 31 December 1992
- Fate: Closed
- Headquarters: Cockatoo Island, Australia
- Owner: Australian National Industries

The Cockatoo Docks & Engineering Company was a ship building and maintenance company which operated the Cockatoo Island Dockyard on Cockatoo Island in Sydney, Australia, between 1933 and 1992.

== History ==
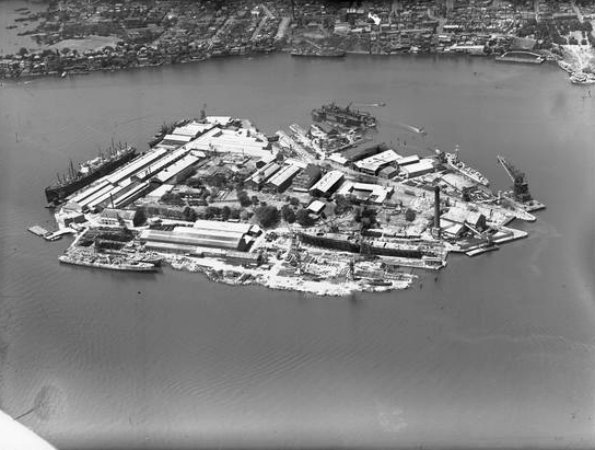
Cockatoo Island in 1951

The Cockatoo Docks & Engineering Company commenced trading on 1 March 1933 taking a 21-year lease over the dockyard on Cockatoo Island from the federal government.

Having held a minority shareholding since 1937, in 1947 Vickers-Armstrongs became the majority shareholder. In February 1954, the lease was renewed for a further 20 years and 8 months, and again from 1 January 1972 for 21 years.

In February 1984, Vickers merged its Australian interests were with the Commonwealth Steel Company to form Comsteel Vickers, Vickers and BHP each owning 38%, with the remaining 24% held by smaller investors. On 4 June 1986, the company was purchased by Australian National Industries (ANI).

As part of a review of Australia's ship building capabilities, the Federal Government decided in 1987 the lease would not be renewed. Although consideration was given to terminating the lease early, in the end it ran its course until 31 December 1992, although the only work performed in the last 18 months was decommissioning the dockyard. A lengthy legal action over various costs and liabilities between the government and ANI was settled in May 1997.

== Ships built ==
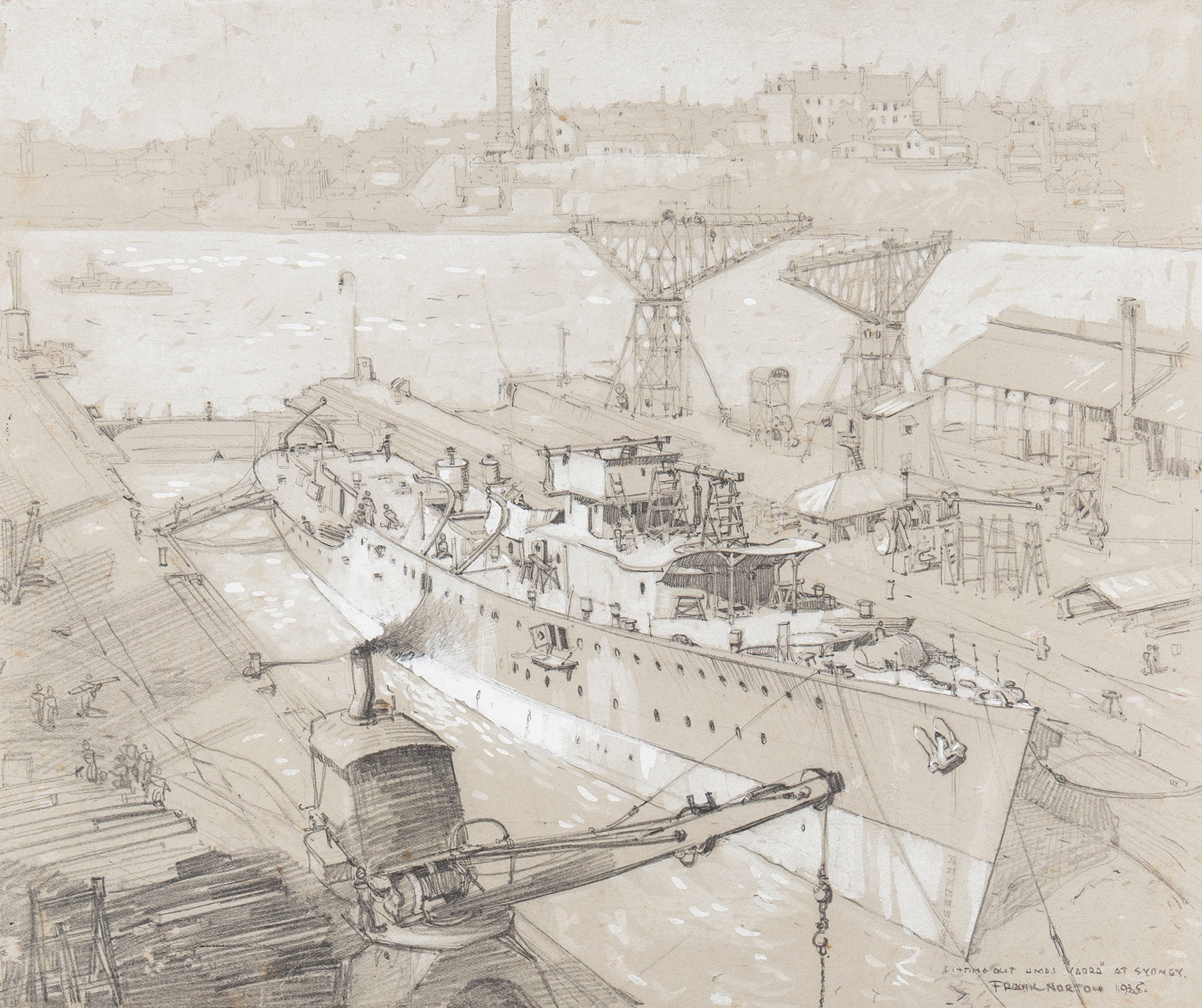
Fitting Out H.M.A.S. Yarra at Sydney (1935) by Frank Norton

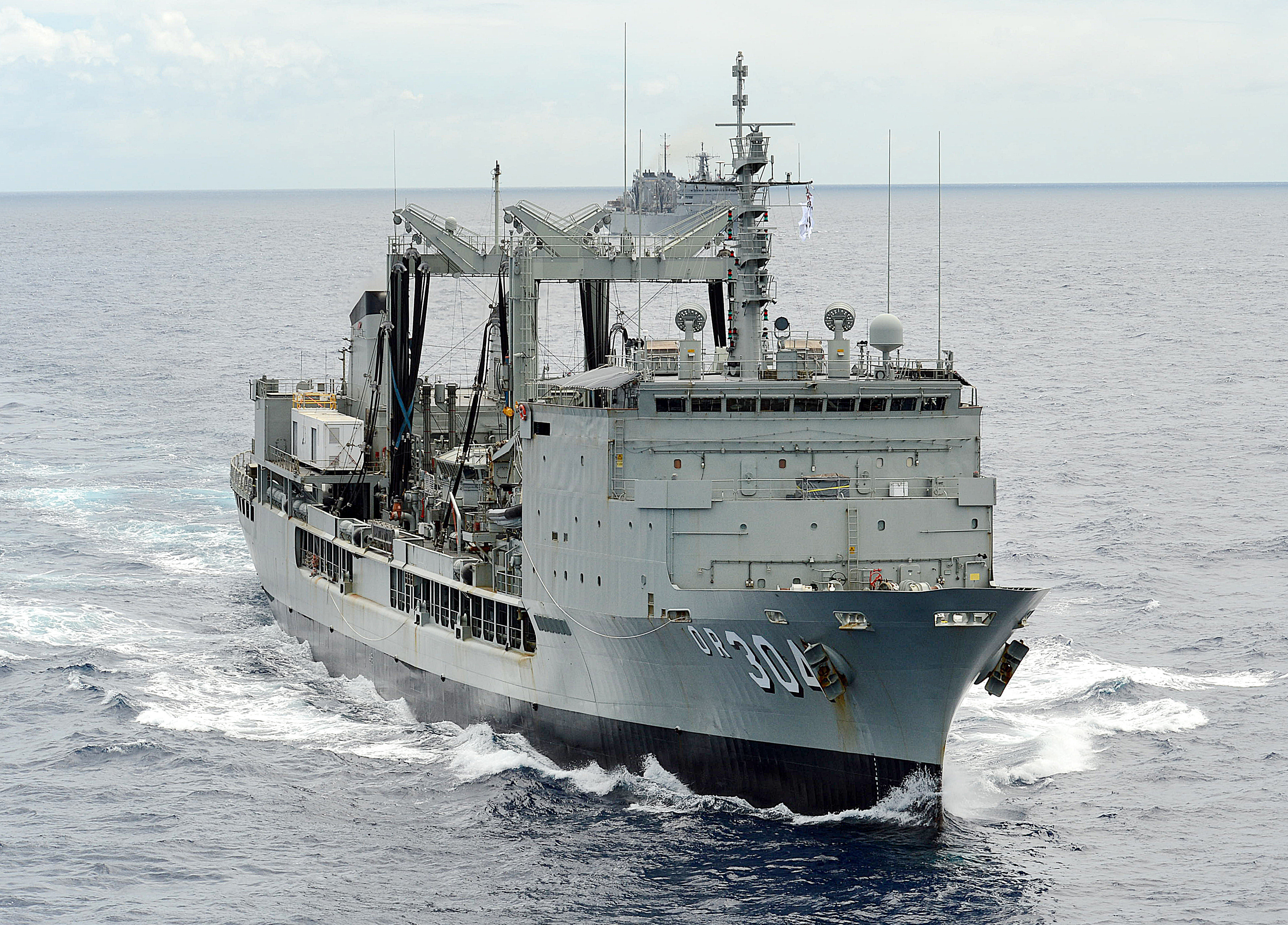
HMAS Success

- Steam Tug Wattle 1933
- Customs patrol vessel Vigilant, later HMAS Vigilant 1938, first aluminium ship built in Australia
- Grimsby-class sloops HMAS Yarra 1935, HMAS Swan 1936, HMAS Parramatta 1939, HMAS Warrego 1940
- Tribal-class destroyers HMAS Arunta 1940, HMAS Warramunga 1942, HMAS Bataan 1944
- Net-class boom defence vessel HMAS Kookaburra 1938
- Bar-class boom defence vessels HMAS Koala 1939, HMAS Kangaroo 1940, HMAS Karangi 1941
- Bathurst-class corvettes HMAS Bathurst 1940, HMAS Goulburn 1940, HMAS Bendigo 1941, HMAS Cessnock 1941, HMAS Wollongong 1941, HMAS Glenelg 1942
- A-class cargo steamships River Clarence 1943 and River Hunter 1945
- Battle-class destroyer HMAS Tobruk
- Daring-class destroyers HMAS Voyager 1952, HMAS Vampire 1956
- River-class destroyer escorts HMAS Parramatta 1959, HMAS Stuart 1961, HMAS Torrens 1968
- Empress of Australia 1964
- Destroyer tender HMAS Stalwart 1966
- Durance-class tanker HMAS Success 1984

== Other work ==
In World War II the dockyard was the main ship repair facility in the Pacific Ocean, with more than 250 ships repaired. The Cunard liners RMS Queen Mary and RMS Queen Elizabeth were converted into troop ships at Cockatoo Island. In the eight months between August 1942 and March 1943, Cockatoo repaired four United States Navy cruisers: USS Chicago, USS Chester, USS Portland and USS New Orleans. Many ships of the Royal Australian Navy (RAN) were repaired.

From the early 1960s, the dockyard refitted RAN vessels including British T-class submarines (5), Oberon-class submarines (14) and Attack-class patrol boats (43).
