= William Aliapoulos =

Engineer and 1st Lieutenant of the 406th Engineer Combat Company

Lt. William "Vasilios" "Bill" George Aliapoulos (Greek: Βασίλειος Γ. Αλιαπούλιος; August 13, 1917 Manchester, New Hampshire, US – October 20, 2008 Toledo, Ohio, US) was an American-born Greek engineer and 1st Lieutenant platoon leader (officer) of the 406th Engineer Combat Company 3rd Platoon of the only tactical deception unit of the American Army in World War II, called the "Ghost Army", officially known as the 23rd Headquarters Special Troops. Aliapoulos was awarded the Bronze Star medal for service during Operation Brittany.

Aliapoulos is mentioned in a film and numerous books: in the documentary, The Ghost Army directed by Rick Beyer, pictured and mentioned in page 29 of the book Ghosts of the ETO - American Tactical Deception Units in the European Theatre 1944-1945 written by the author Jonathan Gawne and pictured and mentioned in the book The Ghost Army of World War II: How One Top-Secret Unit Deceived the Enemy with Inflatable Tanks, Sound Effects, and Other Audacious Fakery written by the author Rick Beyer.

== Awards and heroism ==
Aliapoulos was awarded the Bronze Star of Valor for service during Operation Brittany. with the Ghost Army (officially known as the 23rd Headquarters Special Troops). during World War II.

Earlier in his life, Aliapoulos was featured in The Boston Globe newspaper for rescuing two children from their cribs in a tenement fire in Manchester, New Hampshire in 1939. The newspaper reads: "Children Saved in Fire, Manchester, N. H., April 26.- (AP.) Snapped from their crib as flames licked at their bedroom door, two small children were saved by William Aliapoulos, 21, and two others were rescued by firemen while flames swept through a three- story tenement block today. Twelve persons fled from the fire which was caused, firemen said, by an exploding range burner which drenched the first floor kitchen in flaming fuel oil."

== Early life ==
Aliapoulos was born on August 13, 1917 in Manchester, New Hampshire, US, to Greek immigrants, George Apostol Aliapoulos and Despina Pervana from the village Pentalofos "previously known as Zoupanion" in the Voio regional unit, of Eastern Macedonia, Greece. Pentalofos was previously zoned in the regional unit Kozani, prior to 2011. Aliapoulos is the 2nd youngest of 4 siblings. His sisters: Amelia, Arety (died near or on birth), Mary and Irene Aliapoulos.

== Education ==
After graduating from Manchester Central High School in Manchester, New Hampshire, Aliapoulos attended various academic colleges and majors until settling on Engineering. First, Aliapoulos briefly attended Brookline Seminary in Massachusetts, to become a Greek Orthodox Priest, then Aliapoulos subsequently switched majors and enrolled in the University of New Hampshire in 1942.

While at UNH, Aliapoulos was group leader of UHC's chapter of the National Greek War Relief Association on campus. Aliapoulos' writing was published The New Hampshire newspaper article "War Relief Program Commenced To Assist Struggling Greeks" on March 7, 1941, in solidarity with his heritage and was leader of the school's Greek society and later in the article "The Greek War Relief Dance" about the benefit event on March 21, 2021.

In 1942, World War II broke out and Aliapoulos enlisted in the American Army. Thus having to leave university early, and to resume at a later date. Aliapoulos was chosen for Officer's Candidate School and upon graduation, became a Second Lieutenant. While Aliapoulos was overseas he was part of the Ghost Army, also called the 23rd U.S. Special Troops, the only tactical deception unit of the American Army. Aliapoulos later became 1st Lieutenant.

After the war, Aliapoulos resumed to finish his academic degree, that was halted because of the war, at the University of Toledo in Ohio. Aliapoulos attended classes in the evening, while working for Surface Combustion during the day, at UT for 17 years, finally graduating with a mechanical engineering degree.

== Marriage ==
in 1942, William Aliapoulos met American-born Greek, Frances "Frannie" Nicholas Moulopoulos, while traveling thru the USA before WWII deployment to Europe. Frances was the daughter of Greek immigrants, Nicholas Moulopoulos and Aphrodite Billis. While overseas in Europe for deployment, William named his army jeep "Paper Doll" after Frances, in the Ghost Army."

After the war, in 1945, William married Frances in her hometown of Toledo, Ohio, which became William's new residence. Frances was an artist and art instructor at the Toledo Museum of Art. Frances attended Scott High School and graduated from the University of Toledo.

On December 7, 1947, William and Frances appeared in the Boston Globe "A local Toledo family was split by the game....William Aliapoulos, a Toledo resident, is a New Hampshire Grad, while his wife went to the U. of Toledo....They sat on opposite sides of the field."

In 1949, William and Frances had their first daughter Elaine, and four years later, had their second daughter Jodi. William and Frances have two granddaughters, Kristi and Alexandra.

== Work and continued education ==
Aliapoulos was hired as an engineer at Surface Combustion, a Toledo engineering firm. The North American manufacturer specialized in producing industrial furnaces and heat treating equipment. On June 22, 1963, Aliapoulos was featured in The Daily Sentinel Tribune newspaper. It reads, "Aliapoulos, a supervisor at the Surface Combustion Division of Midland-Ross Corporation was the main speaker of the evening."

== Affiliations ==
Continuing with his service in university and in the Army, Aliapoulos, went on to become a member of many organizations, including the Holy Trinity Greek Orthodox Cathedral in Toledo, Ohio, the Fort Industry Masonic Lodge, The Toastmaters and the Order of AHEPA, also known as the "American Hellenic Educational Progressive Association, a "Greek American fraternal organization that promotes Hellenic ideals through community service and volunteerism."

== Death ==
William died on October 20, 2008, in Toledo Hospital within seven months after his wife Frances died on March 23, 2008.
