= HMAS Bataan =

Australian Tribal-class destroyer

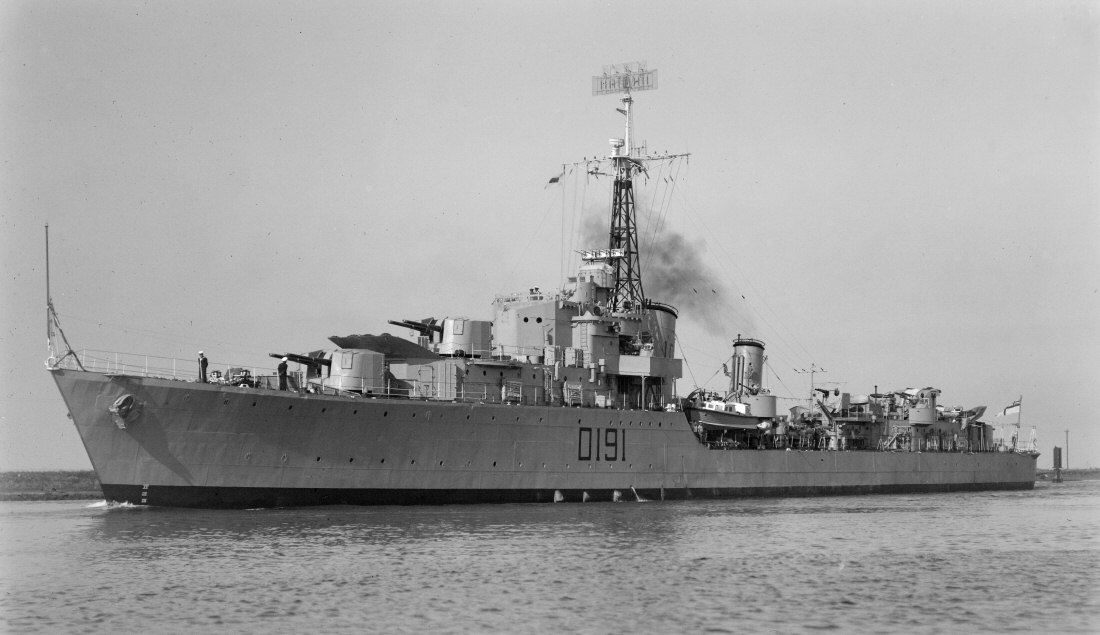
- HMAS Bataan

History

Australia
- Namesake: Battle of Bataan
- Builder: Cockatoo Docks and Engineering Company
- Laid down: 18 February 1942
- Launched: 15 January 1944
- Commissioned: 25 May 1945
- Decommissioned: 18 October 1954
- Honours and awards: Battle honours: Korea 1950–52
- Fate: Sold for scrap 1958

General characteristics
- Class & type: Tribal-class destroyer
- Displacement: 2,116 tons
- Length: 377.5 feet (115.1 m) overall; 355 feet (108 m) between perpendiculars
- Beam: 36.5 feet (11.1 m)
- Installed power: 3 × Admiralty 3-drum boilers; 44,000 shp (33,000 kW)
- Propulsion: 2 propellers; 2 steam turbines
- Speed: 36.5 knots (67.6 km/h; 42.0 mph)
- Complement: 14 officers, 247 ratings
- Armament: 2 × twin 4.7 in (120 mm) guns; 1 × twin 4 in (102 mm) DP guns; 6 × 40 mm Bofors AA guns; 1 × quadruple 2 pdr (1.6 in (40 mm)) AA guns; 1 × quadruple 21 in (533 mm) torpedo tubes; 2 × depth charge throwers

HMAS Bataan (D9/I91/D191) was a Tribal-class destroyer of the Royal Australian Navy (RAN). Laid down in 1942 and commissioned in 1945, the destroyer was originally to be named Chingilli or Kurnai but was renamed prior to launch in honour of the US stand during the Battle of Bataan.

Although not completed in time to see combat service during World War II, Bataan was present in Tokyo Bay for the official Japanese surrender, and made four deployments to the British Commonwealth Occupation Force. In 1950, while en route for a fifth Occupation Force deployment, the Korean War started, and the destroyer was diverted to serve as a patrol ship and carrier escort until early 1951. A second Korean tour was made during 1952. Bataan was paid off in 1954, and sold for scrap in 1958.

== Description ==
Bataan was one of three Tribal-class destroyers ordered for the RAN. These ships were designed with a displacement of 2,116 tons, had a length of 377.5 feet (115.1 m) overall and 355 feet (108 m) between perpendiculars, and a beam of 36.5 feet (11.1 m). Propulsion was provided by three drum-type boilers supplying Parsons Impulse Reaction turbines; these provided 44,000 shaft horsepower (33,000 kW) to the ship's two propeller shafts. Maximum speed was 36.5 knots (67.6 km/h; 42.0 mph), with an economical speed of 11.5 knots (21.3 km/h; 13.2 mph). The ship's company consisted on 261 personnel: 14 officers and 247 sailors.

On completion, the destroyer's primary armament consisted of six 4.7-inch Mark VII guns in three twin turrets. She was also armed with two 4-inch Mark XVI* guns in a twin turret, six 40 mm Bofors anti-aircraft guns, a quad-barrelled 2-pounder Mark VIII pom pom, a quadruple torpedo tube set for four 21-inch torpedoes, two depth charge throwers, and 46 depth charges. In 1945, the number of torpedoes and depth charges carried was reduced.

== Construction and career ==
The destroyer was laid down by Cockatoo Docks and Engineering Company Limited at the Cockatoo Island Dockyard, Sydney in New South Wales on 18 February 1942. She was launched on 15 January 1944 by Jean MacArthur, the wife of General Douglas MacArthur. The ship was commissioned into the RAN on 25 May 1945, with construction work completing on 26 June. The destroyer was originally to be named Chingilli, but this was changed to Kurnai (after the Kurnai or Gunai Aborigines) before construction started. The name was changed yet again prior to the ship's launch to Bataan; honouring ties between Australia and the United States by recognising the stand by US troops during the Battle of Bataan, and reciprocating the US decision to name a cruiser USS Canberra in honour of the Australian cruiser HMAS Canberra, lost at the Battle of Savo Island.

On entering service, Bataan sailed to Japan via the Philippines; although arriving too late to participate in combat, she was present in Tokyo for the official Japanese surrender on 2 September 1945. Bataan remained in Japanese waters until 18 November, serving as representative of the Australian military and helping coordinate the repatriation of prisoners-of-war. Between late 1946 and late 1949, the destroyer spent 17 months over four tours of duty in Japanese waters with the British Commonwealth Occupation Force. The rest of these three years was spent operating in Australian waters. It was used in the 1948 film Always Another Dawn.

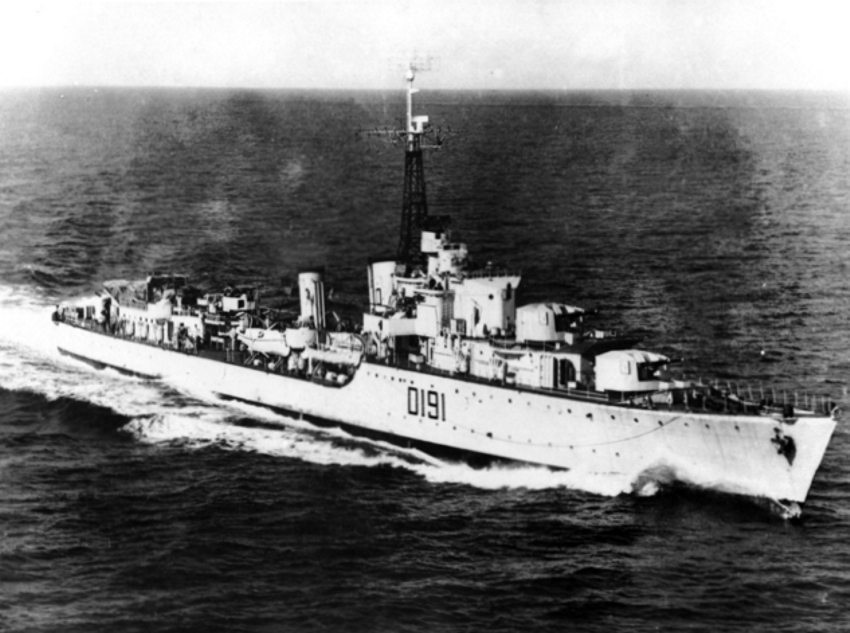
Bataan operating off Korea

In late June 1950, Bataan was en route to Japan for a fifth tour when the Korean War started. From early July 1950 until 29 May 1951, the destroyer operated off Korea; patrolling and blockading, escorting aircraft carriers, and bombarding shore targets. A second Korean tour occurred between 4 February and 31 August 1952, with Bataan fulfilling most of the same duties as before. Bataan was presented with the battle honour "Korea 1950–52" for her service. In November 1953, Bataan visited Singapore. This was the only time since the Korean War, and the only time for the rest of her career, that the destroyer would leave Australian waters.

== Decommissioning and fate ==
Bataan paid off at Sydney on 18 October 1954, and was laid up in reserve awaiting conversion to an anti-submarine escort. The conversion was cancelled in 1957, with Bataan placed on the disposal list, then sold for scrap to T. Carr and Company of Sydney in 1958.
