= HMAS Biloela =

Australian naval vessel

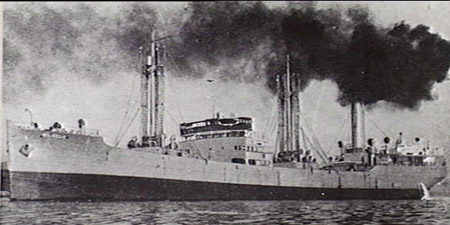
- HMAS Biloela in 1922

History

Australia (RAN)
- Builder: Cockatoo Island Dockyard, Sydney
- Laid down: 21 October 1918
- Launched: 10 April 1919
- Commissioned: 5 July 1920
- Decommissioned: 14 November 1927
- Fate: Sunk

General characteristics
- Type: Collier
- Tonnage: 5,596 gross register tons; 3,366 net register tons
- Length: 382 ft 1 in (116.46 m) (overall)
- Beam: 54 ft (16 m)
- Draught: 22 ft 6 in (6.86 m)
- Propulsion: Triple expansion reciprocating engines. 1 screw
- Speed: 11 knots (20 km/h)
- Complement: 70
- Armament: Mountings for two 4-inch B.L. guns

HMAS Biloela was a fleet collier operated by the Royal Australian Navy (RAN) from 1920 to 1927.

Biloela was built at Cockatoo Island Dockyard in Sydney, and was the first ship to be entirely built from Australian materials to an Australian design. She was completed on 5 July 1920 and supported the RAN's coal burning warships during peacetime training cruises. These warships were decommissioned in the second half of the 1920s, and Biloela was decommissioned into reserve on 14 November 1927.

While the RAN considered converting Biloela to a seaplane tender these plans did not eventuate and the ship was sold to a commercial company in March 1931. The ship was renamed several times, finally being renamed Cree. During World War II, the ship operated in European waters and was attacked by German aircraft and damaged by a mine in the early part of the war. Cree was eventually sunk by a German submarine on 21 November 1940.

Biloela is an Aboriginal word for "big white bird" and is the name of a town in Queensland. The town was named for the sulphur crested cockatoos that inhabit the region.
