= HMAS Kookaburra =

Survey ships of the Royal Australian Navy

Coordinates: 33°51.300′S 151°21.196′E

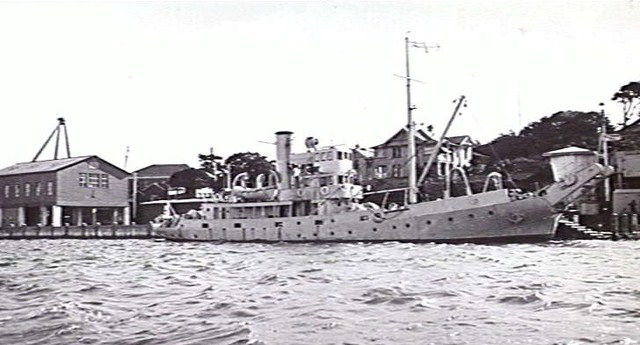
- HMAS Kookaburra docked at Garden Island

History

Australia
- Builder: Cockatoo Docks & Engineering Company
- Laid down: 4 July 1938
- Launched: 29 October 1938
- Commissioned: 28 February 1939
- Decommissioned: 15 January 1946
- Recommissioned: November 1950
- Decommissioned: November 1950
- Recommissioned: 11 May 1956
- Decommissioned: 3 December 1958
- Honours and awards: Battle honours: Darwin 1942-43
- Fate: Sold in August 1965, scuttled in March 1970

General characteristics
- Class & type: Net-class boom defence vessel
- Displacement: 533 tons
- Length: 160 ft (49 m)
- Beam: 26 ft 6 in (8.08 m)
- Draught: 10 ft 3 in (3.12 m)
- Propulsion: Triple-expansion steam engine
- Speed: 9.5 knots (17.6 km/h; 10.9 mph)
- Armament: 1 × 3-inch anti-aircraft gun, 2 × Vickers machine guns

HMAS Kookaburra (A331) was a Net-class boom defence vessel of the Royal Australian Navy (RAN), which served during World War II.

== Construction ==
Kookaburra was one of three ships ordered by the Royal Australian Navy for use as boom-net defence vessels. She was laid down by the Cockatoo Docks & Engineering Company at Cockatoo Island Dockyard in Sydney on 4 April 1938, launched on 29 October 1938, and commissioned into the RAN on 28 February 1939.

== Operational history ==
Originally used as boom defence ship and anti-submarine training vessel in Sydney, Kookaburra was transferred to Darwin in April 1940. The ship served as a boom defense and examination vessel in Darwin, and remained there until the end of World War II, with the exception of a refit in Brisbane between September 1942 and February 1943. Kookaburra received the battle honour "Darwin 1942-43" for her wartime service.

On 15 January 1946, Kookaburra was paid off into reserve, was briefly recommissioned for a voyage to Sydney in 1950, and underwent conversion to a "Special Duties Vessel". Kookaburra was recommissioned again on 11 May 1956 as a survey and general duties ship.

In July 1952, the ship visited Brisbane. During this visit, a paperboy delivering to the ship fell overboard and was rescued by two personnel from Kookaburra.

== Decommissioning and fate ==
Kookaburra was decommissioned for the final time on 3 December 1958. She was marked for disposal on 24 June 1965, sold in August 1965, and scuttled in March 1970.
