= HMAS Wollongong (J172) =

1941 Bathurst-class corvette

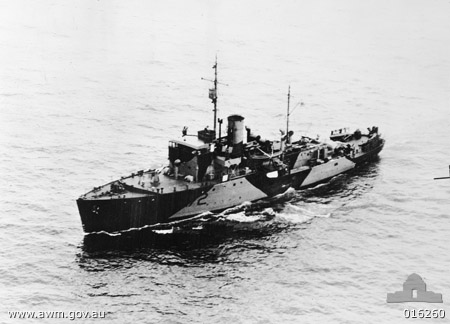
- HMAS Wollongong in 1943

History

Australia
- Namesake: City of Wollongong, New South Wales
- Builder: Cockatoo Docks & Engineering Company
- Laid down: 29 January 1941
- Launched: 5 July 1941
- Commissioned: 23 October 1941
- Decommissioned: 11 February 1946
- Motto: "Second To None"
- Honours and awards: Battle honours: Pacific 1942–45; Indian Ocean 1942–45; Sicily 1943; Mediterranean 1943; East Indies 1943; Okinawa 1945
- Fate: Transferred to RNN
- Badge

Netherlands
- Name: Banda
- Namesake: Banda Islands
- Fate: Transferred to TNI-AL

Indonesia
- Name: Radjawali
- Namesake: Aquilinae
- Acquired: April 1950
- Fate: Sold for scrap in 1968

General characteristics
- Class & type: Bathurst-class corvette
- Displacement: 650 tons
- Length: 186 ft (57 m)
- Beam: 31 ft (9.4 m)
- Draught: 8 ft 6 in (2.59 m)
- Propulsion: Triple expansion, 2 shafts. 2,000 hp (1,500 kW)
- Speed: 15 knots (28 km/h; 17 mph)
- Complement: 85
- Armament: 1 × 4 inch Mk XIX gun; 3 × Oerlikon 20 mm cannons (later 2); 1 × Bofors 40 mm L/60 gun (later); Machine guns; Depth charge chutes and throwers

HMAS Wollongong (J172), named for the city of Wollongong, New South Wales, was one of 60 Bathurst-class corvettes constructed during World War II and one of 20 built for the Admiralty but manned by personnel of and commissioned into the Royal Australian Navy (RAN).

== Design and construction ==
In 1938, the Australian Commonwealth Naval Board (ACNB) identified the need for a general purpose 'local defence vessel' capable of both anti-submarine and mine-warfare duties, while easy to construct and operate. The vessel was initially envisaged as having a displacement of approximately 500 tons, a speed of at least 10 knots (19 km/h; 12 mph), and a range of 2,000 nautical miles (3,700 km; 2,300 mi) The opportunity to build a prototype in the place of a cancelled Bar-class boom defence vessel saw the proposed design increased to a 680-ton vessel, with a 15.5 knots (28.7 km/h; 17.8 mph) top speed, and a range of 2,850 nautical miles (5,280 km; 3,280 mi), armed with a 4-inch gun, equipped with asdic, and able to fitted with either depth charges or minesweeping equipment depending on the planned operations: although closer in size to a sloop than a local defence vessel, the resulting increased capabilities were accepted due to advantages over British-designed mine warfare and anti-submarine vessels. Construction of the prototype HMAS Kangaroo did not go ahead, but the plans were retained. The need for locally built 'all-rounder' vessels at the start of World War II saw the "Australian Minesweepers" (designated as such to hide their anti-submarine capability, but popularly referred to as "corvettes") approved in September 1939, with 60 constructed during the course of the war: 36 ordered by the RAN, 20 (including Wollongong) ordered by the British Admiralty but manned and commissioned as RAN vessels, and 4 for the Royal Indian Navy.

Wollongong was laid down by Cockatoo Docks & Engineering Company on 29 January 1941. She was launched on 5 July 1941, by the wife of Jack Beasley, then Minister for Supply and Shipping, and was commissioned into the RAN on 23 October 1941.

== Operational history ==
=== World War II ===
After entering active service, Wollongong was deployed as a convoy escort in Australian waters. On 11 January 1942, she was sent to Singapore. The corvette was involved in patrols and the evacuation of Allied personnel from Malaya, Java, and Sumatra, and was the last Australian ship to leave Singapore before it was surrendered to the Japanese on 15 February. She then provided a rear escort to a convoy fleeing Tanjong Priok, Batavia. During this, Wollongong, stood by the tanker HMS War Sidar, which ran aground and eventually had to be abandoned, was forced to sink the minesweeper HMS Gemas, which attempted to turn back to the captured port, and broke off from the convoy to escort the damaged SS British Judge, which was torpedoed on the night of 28 February and could not keep up. The main convoy and the escorting sloop HMAS Yarra was sunk on 4 March by a Japanese cruiser group.

Wollongong was then ordered to Fremantle, where she served as an escort ship before sailing on 14 September to Diego Garcia to join the British Eastern Fleet. She operated in the Indian Ocean, Persian Gulf, Arabian Sea, and Mediterranean as a convoy escort and patrol vessel, and twice entered the Atlantic Ocean to meet Mediterranean-bound convoys. In September 1943, while in the Mediterranean, Wollongong was called on to shell the beached German submarine U-617, and was awarded partial credit for the submarine's destruction.

Wollongong returned to Australian waters in February 1945, then was assigned to the British Pacific Fleet. The corvette was involved in the Battle of Okinawa. After the end of World War II, Wollongong was sent to the Far East, where she was involved in anti-piracy patrols, before returning to Australia at the end of 1945.

The ship received six battle honours for her wartime service: "Pacific 1942–45", "Indian Ocean 1942–45", "Sicily 1943", "Mediterranean 1943", "East Indies 1943", and "Okinawa 1945".

=== RNLN service ===
After the end of the war, Wollongong was marked for transfer to the Royal Netherlands Navy (RNLN). She was decommissioned in Sydney on 11 February 1946, was recommissioned into the RNLN, and renamed HNLMS Banda.

On 26 October 1946 a motor cutter from the Dutch escort carrier HNLMS Karel Doorman was sent to Banda to transfer personnel. This happened while she was located in the Java Sea.

The corvette remained with the RNLN until April 1950.

=== TNI-AL service ===
The ship was transferred to the new Indonesian Navy in April 1950, and was renamed KRI Radjawali.

The corvette left service in early 1968, and was scrapped in Hong Kong.
