= CLS4 Carpentaria =

1917 Australian lightship

Coordinates: 33.868139°S 151.198259°E

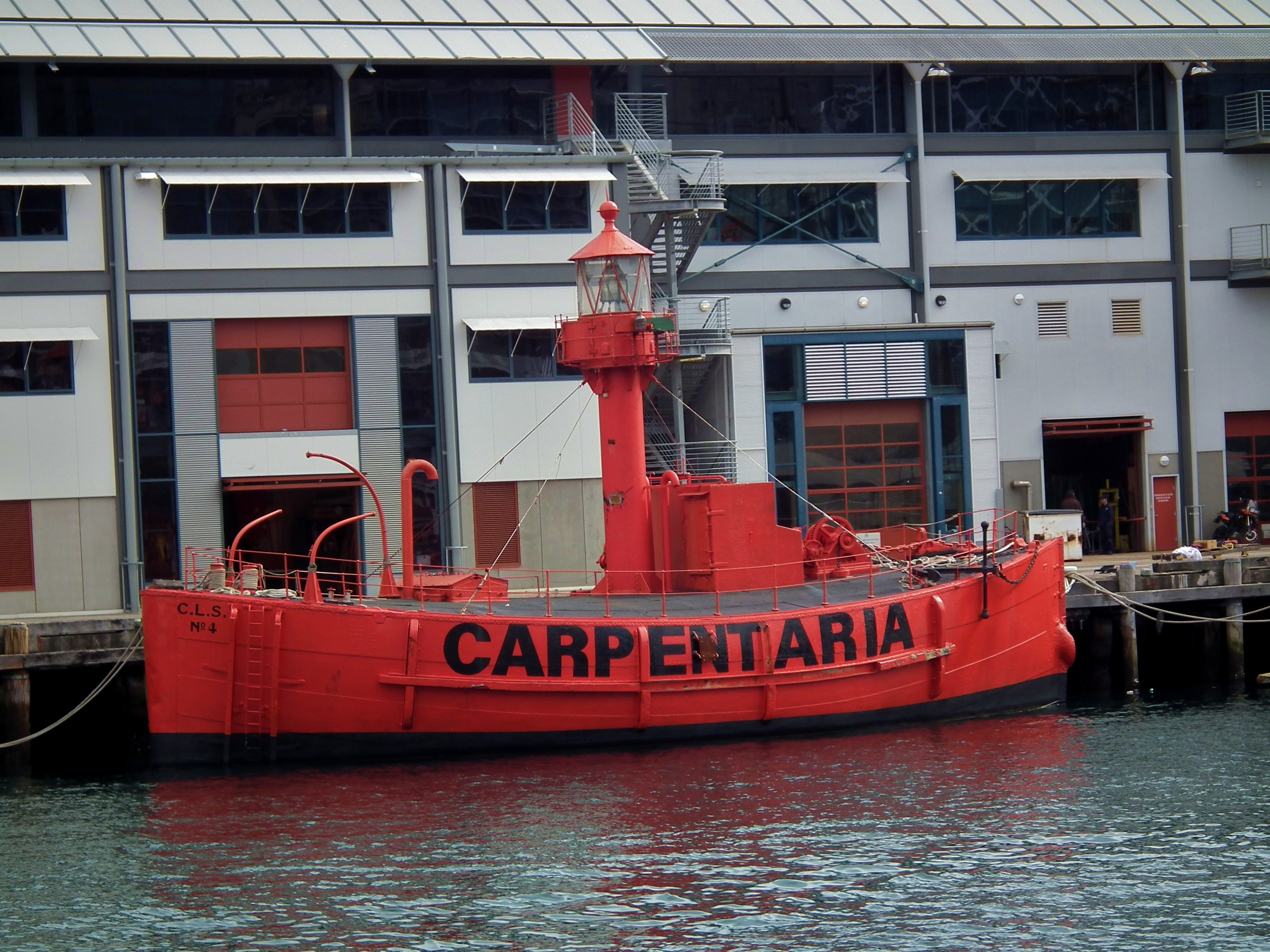
- Lightship CLS4 "Carpentaria" moored at Wharf 7, Darling Harbour.

History

Australia
- Name: Carpentaria
- Namesake: Gulf of Carpentaria
- Owner: Australian National Maritime Museum
- Builder: Cockatoo Island Dockyard, Sydney, Australia
- Laid down: 1916
- Completed: 1917
- Commissioned: 1917
- Decommissioned: 1985
- Home port: Sydney
- Fate: Preserved
- Status: Museum ship as of late 2016

General characteristics
- Type: Lightvessel
- Displacement: 164 t (161.4 long tons; 180.8 short tons)
- Length: 21.94 m (72.0 ft)
- Beam: 7.82 m (25.7 ft)
- Draft: 2.74 m (9.0 ft)
- Propulsion: none
- Complement: none
- Notes: Career and characteristics data from “ANMM” website, unless noted otherwise.

Commonwealth Lightship 4 (CLS4) Carpentaria is a lightship that was in service from 1917 to 1985 with the Commonwealth Lighthouse Service, (Note: The function of the Commonwealth Lighthouse Service was later performed by the Federal Department of Transport.) built at the Cockatoo Island Dockyard and commissioned in 1917. The vessel is named after the Gulf of Carpentaria, where it spent most of its service life together with its sister ship CLS2 (also named Carpentaria).

== Design ==
CLS4 Carpentaria is one of four identical lightships designed in 1915 by the Scottish firm D & C Stevenson of Edinburgh and built in 1916-17 at the Cockatoo Island Dockyard in Sydney, Australia; they were designated CLS1 to CLS4. The design is optimised for operating unmanned anchored at a stationary position on station offshore for prolonged periods of time, away from port.

Carpentaria has a riveted steel hull and no superstructure, with a single mast amidships mounting the beacon lantern atop. Being a stationary vessel, she has no installed propulsion engines her and has to be towed to change position or return to port. In 1950, CLS4 was equipped with a diesel engine to power an anchor windlass; it was protected by a steel deckhouse added at that moment.

Carpentaria's lantern was powered by acetylene gas, of which she carried a 6-month supply in 4 tanks; the gas flow was controlled by a valve which would regulate the flashes of the light according to the code assigned to the station. The gas would shut down during daylight; the beacon light could be seen from 10 nautical miles away. She also carried a bell activated by the rolling motion, so it could be heard on low visibility conditions.

== History ==
CLS4 Carpentaria was built at the Cockatoo Island Dockyard; launched in 1917, she was put in service that year, together with her sister ship CLS2, in the Gulf of Carpentaria. They would alternate between being on station and in port for maintenance.

Later in their career, Carpentaria was assigned as traffic separator in the Bass Strait, where they narrowly avoided being hit by container ships.

In 1985, both Carpentaria ships were decommissioned; later they were destined for preservation: CLS2 was given to the Queensland Maritime Museum in Brisbane, QLD, while CLS4 went to the Australian National Maritime Museum in Sydney, NSW.

As of late 2016, CLS4 Carpentaria is still part of the collection of the ANMM and is on display at the museum's wharves in Darling Harbour.

== See also ==
- List of lighthouses in Australia
