= HMAS Mombah =

History

Australia
- Name: Mombah
- Builder: Cockatoo Island Dockyard
- Laid down: 21 October 1920
- Launched: 23 April 1921
- Completed: 20 February 1923
- In service: 1923
- Out of service: 1930
- In service: March 1944
- Out of service: 1948
- Fate: Sold in 1930 and after Second World War service sold in 1948
- Name: Mombah
- Owner: Melbourne Harbour Trust (1930-1944)
- Fate: Scuttled off Port Villa in 1968.

HMAS Mombah was a coal lighter and stores ship of the Royal Australian Navy (RAN) between 1923 and 1930 and later during the Second World War between 1944 and 1948.

Mombah was constructed at the Cockatoo Island Dockyard for the RAN. She was laid down on 21 October 1920 and launched on 23 April 1921. She was completed on 20 February 1923 and commissioned shortly afterwards. She was sold in 1930 to the Melbourne Harbour Trust.

In March 1944, she was requisitioned by the RAN, and she was towed by the tug Heros from Sydney to Darwin, and then to New Guinea. She was towed by the tug HMAS Reserve back to Sydney at war's end, where she was used as a merchant vessel due to a shortage of shipping available. She was sold in 1948 and towed to Port Vila and was used as a copra storage hulk. She was towed out to sea in 1968 and scuttled.
