= HMAS Barcoo =

River-class frigate of the Royal Australian Navy

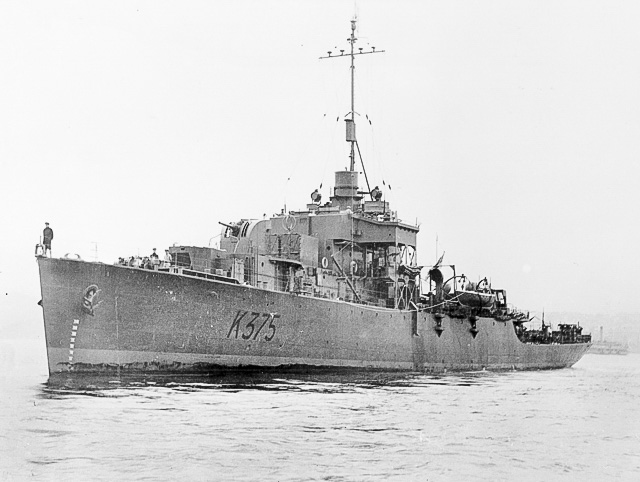
- HMAS Barcoo in 1944

History

Australia
- Namesake: Barcoo River
- Builder: Cockatoo Docks & Engineering Company, Sydney
- Laid down: 21 October 1942
- Launched: 26 August 1943
- Commissioned: 17 January 1944
- Decommissioned: 21 February 1964
- Motto: "We Clear the Way"
- Honours and awards: Battle honours: Pacific 1944–45; New Guinea 1944; Borneo 1945
- Fate: Sold for scrap on 15 February 1972 to N.W. Kennedy Ltd., Vancouver. Scrapped in Taiwan.

General characteristics
- Class & type: River-class frigate
- Displacement: 1,420 long tons (1,440 t; 1,590 short tons); 2,020 long tons (2,050 t; 2,260 short tons) (deep load)
- Length: 301.3 feet (91.85 m)
- Beam: 36.7 feet (11.18 m)
- Draught: 12.0 feet (3.66 m)
- Propulsion: 2 × Admiralty 3-drum boilers, reciprocating vertical triple expansion engines, 5,500 horsepower (4,100 kW), 2 shafts
- Speed: 20 knots (37 km/h; 23 mph)
- Range: 5,180 nautical miles (9,593 km) at 12 knots (22 km/h; 14 mph)
- Complement: 140
- Armament: 2 × QF 4 inch (102 mm) /45 Mark XVI guns, single HA/LA Mark XX mounts; 2 × QF 40 mm Bofors, single Mark VII mounts; 6 × QF 20 mm Oerlikons, single Mark III mounts; 1 × Hedgehog anti-submarine mortar; 2 × Squid anti-submarine mortars; Depth charge throwers

HMAS Barcoo (K375/F375/A245) was a River-class frigate of the Royal Australian Navy (RAN). One of twelve frigates constructed in Australia during World War II, Barcoo (named after the Barcoo River), was laid down by Cockatoo Docks & Engineering Company, Sydney in 1942, and commissioned in early 1944.

Most of the ship's wartime service was spent in New Guinea waters; with primary duties including patrol, convoy escort, troop transport, along with the shelling of Japanese positions. In April 1945, Barcoo was attached to the Borneo campaign. She was the command ship for a landing craft division at the Tarakan landings in May, and directly supported the North Borneo landings in June, before being assigned to general escort and fire support roles.

After World War II, Barcoo was converted into a survey ship. In 1948, the ship spent over a week aground on West Beach, South Australia after bring driven ashore by a storm. Barcoo spent the rest of her career surveying the waters of Australia and New Guinea, except for periods of deactivation from 1949 to 1951, and from 1956 to 1959. She was decommissioned for the final time in 1964, and sold for scrapping.

== Design and construction ==
Barcoo was one of twelve frigates built in Australia during World War II. She and seven other vessels were constructed to the British River-class design. Barcoo was 301.3 feet (91.85 m) in length, with a beam of 36.7 feet (11.18 m), and a draught of 12.0 feet (3.66 m). The frigate displaced 1,340 tonnes at standard load and 1,923 tonnes at full load. Propulsion machinery consisted of two Admiralty 3-drum boilers, feeding steam to reciprocating vertical triple expansion engines, which provided 5,500 horsepower (4,100 kW) to drive two propeller shafts. Maximum speed was 20 knots (37 km/h; 23 mph), and maximum range was 5,180 nautical miles (9,593 km) at 12 knots (22 km/h; 14 mph). The ship's company consisted of 140 personnel.

Main armament for the frigate consisted of two QF 4-inch (102 mm)/45 calibre Mark XVI guns in single HA/LA Mark XX mounts. This was supplemented by two QF 40 mm Bofors in single Mark VII mounts, and six QF 20 mm Oerlikons in single Mark III mounts. The ship also carried three anti-submarine mortars (one Hedgehog and two Squids) as well as depth charge throwers.

Barcoo was laid down by the Cockatoo Docks & Engineering Company, Sydney on 21 October 1942, launched on 26 August 1943 by the wife of Richard Keane, the Minister for Trade and Customs, and commissioned on 17 January 1944.

== Operational history ==
=== World War II ===
After several weeks of working up, Barcoo was tasked to New Guinea in March 1944 for convoy escort duty. Barcoo and the corvette HMAS Kapunda shelled Japanese positions on Kar Kar Island and at Banabun Harbour. From June to August, the frigate was heavily involved in convoy escort and troop transport duties. On 28 August, Barcoo rescued two United States Army Air Force pilots who had been forced to ditch their P-47 Thunderbolts at sea. During September and October, Barcoo returned to Sydney for maintenance refits. Returning to the New Guinea operations area, Barcoo operated against Japanese positions in New Guinea during November, including the shelling of Wilde Bay. Convoy escort and patrol duties continued until late January 1945, when the frigate returned to Australia.

Barcoo was deployed again to New Guinea in late March 1945, and in April was assigned to United States Navy Task Force 78.1 to support the Borneo campaign. For the Tarakan landings on 1 May, Barcoo was designated as the ship in charge of the landing craft tank division of the assault force. Barcoo was also involved in the North Borneo landings in June, then was assigned to general escort and fire support duties for the rest of the campaign. The frigate fired in anger for the last time on 3 August 1945, during a bombardment of the village of Soengaipaten in Borneo.

Barcoo received the three battle honours for her wartime service: "Pacific 1944–45", "New Guinea 1944", and "Borneo 1945". The ship had sailed over 72,000 nautical miles (133,000 km; 83,000 mi) from commissioning until the end of World War II on 15 August.

=== Post-war ===
Immediately after the war, Barcoo was tasked with repatriation of soldiers and prisoners-of-war, along with patrols of reoccupied areas. After this, the frigate was docked for an eight-month refit at Williamstown Dockyard to convert her into a survey ship. Modification work was completed in July 1946, and the ship began surveying operations in August 1946. During her remaining career, she carried the pennant numbers F375 and A245 at various times.

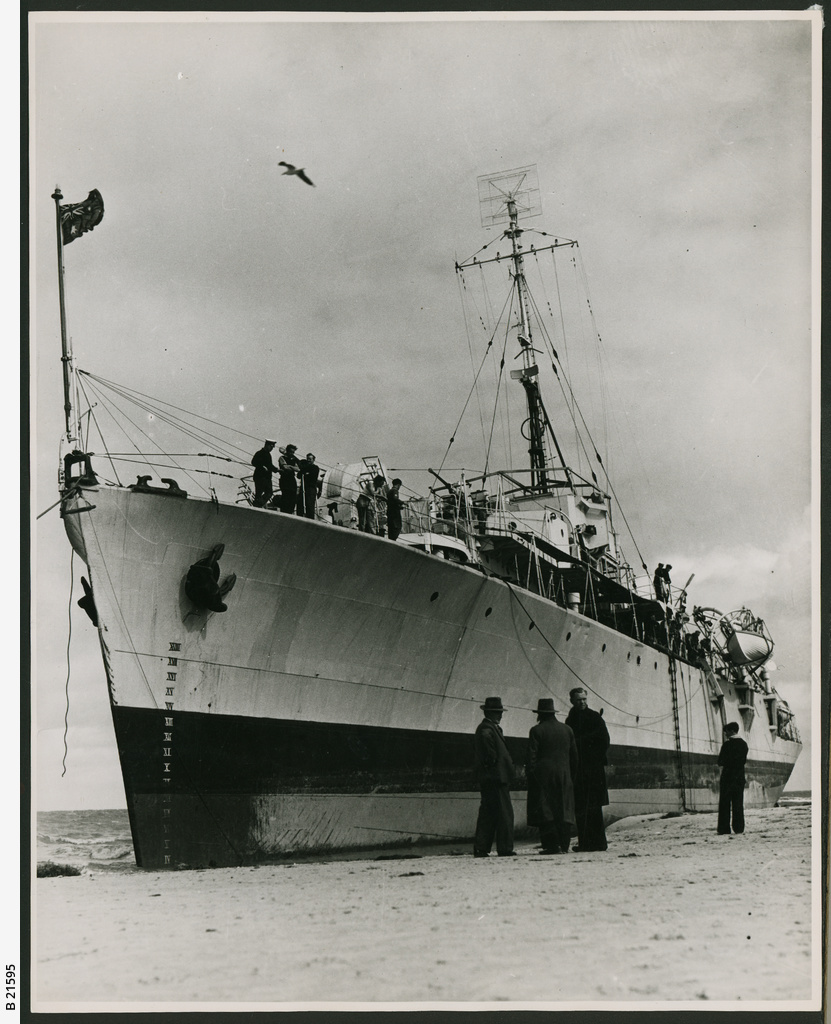
HMAS Barcoo aground on West Beach in April 1948

The ship was almost constantly deployed on survey operations in the waters of Australia and New Guinea for the next three years. In 1947, Barcoo conveyed Australian officials to Timor for visits to the governor of Portuguese (East) Timor and the Dutch colonial administrative centre in West Timor. During April 1948, Barcoo and the sloop HMAS Warrego were deployed together for surveying operations off South Australia. On 11 April 1948, Barcoo ran aground at West Beach, South Australia, having been driven ashore by a violent storm. Despite attempts to lighten the frigate by removing munitions and stores, the combined efforts of three tugboats were unable to pull Barcoo off the beach. A dredger was brought from Adelaide, which cleared a channel behind the stranded frigate. On the evening of 20 April, over a week after the initial beaching, Barcoo was able to be refloated. Warrego towed Barcoo to Port Adelaide for inspection and repairs.

Barcoo was placed in reserve in May 1949. She was recommissioned in March 1951 for use as a training vessel for anti-submarine exercises. The ship resumed survey duties of the Australian coast from July 1952 to April 1956, then returned to Sydney and was paid off on 25 September. The ship was reactivated for further survey work on 7 December 1959. By this point, the ship's armament had been reduced to a single 40 mm Bofors gun. Other modifications around the time of her reactivation included the strengthening of the forward tripod mast, and the addition of a deckhouse on the aft deck.

== Decommissioning and fate ==
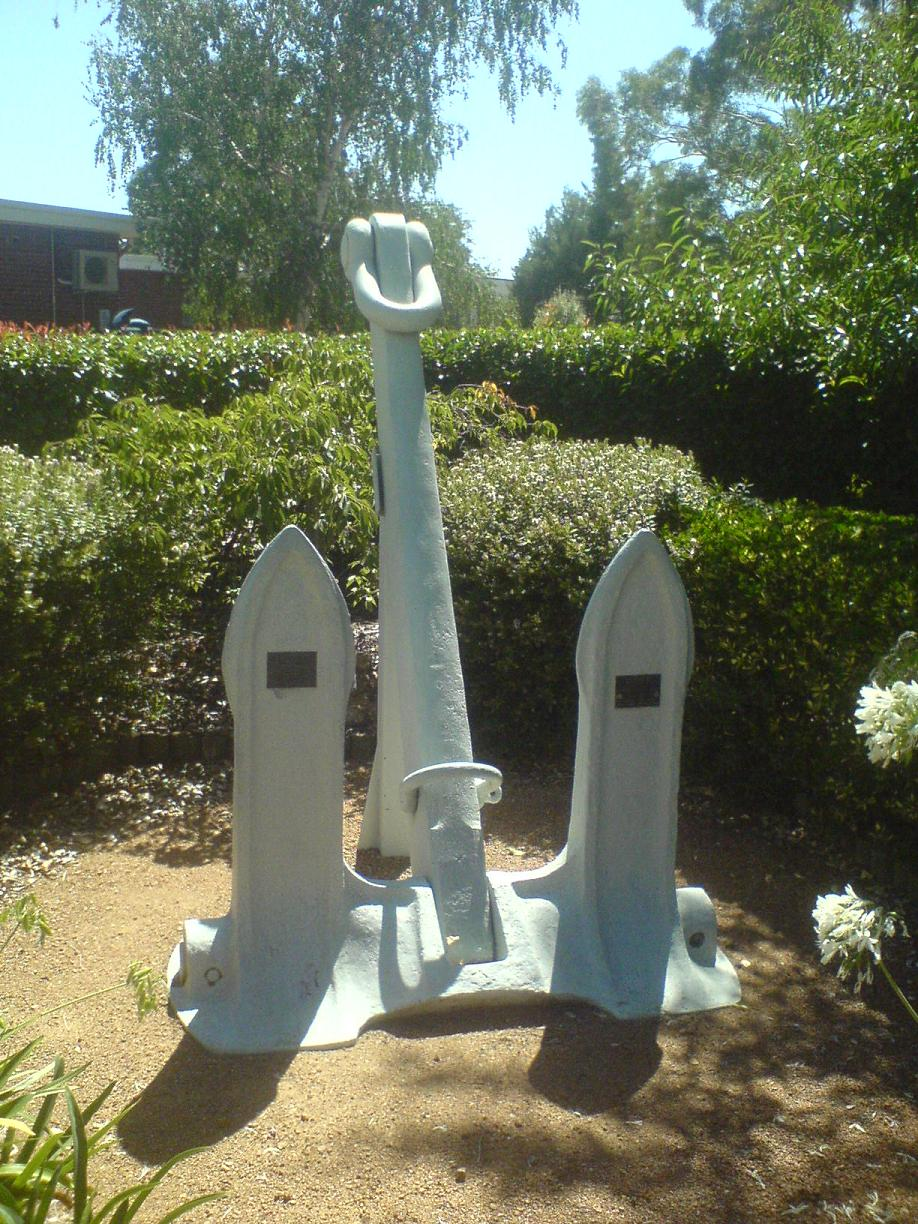
Anchor of HMAS Barcoo, a 'gate guard' at Morshead War Veterans Home, Lyneham, Australian Capital Territory.

Barcoo was decommissioned on 21 February 1964. The frigate had travelled 342,579 nautical miles (634,456 km; 394,233 mi) during her career. The ship was sold for scrapping on 15 February 1972 to N. W. Kennedy, Ltd., Vancouver. The frigate was towed from Sydney to Hong Kong in March, then was taken to Taiwan to be broken up.
