= Midland-Ross =

Midland-Ross Corporation
- Company type: Public
- Industry: Aerospace; brakes; electronics; steel; synthetic fibers
- Founded: December 7, 1957; 68 years ago in Cleveland, Ohio, U.S.
- Defunct: July 1, 1986
- Fate: Acquired by Forstmann Little & Company
- Successor: Parish & Bingham; Detroit Pressed Steel Co.; Parish Manufacturing Co.
- Headquarters: Cleveland, Ohio, U.S.
- Area served: Worldwide
- Divisions: Ross Engineering; Steel City; Surface Combustion; R.P.C.; Nelson Metal Products; Midrex; Waldron-Hartig; Capitol Foundry; Janitrol Aero; Midland Frame; National Castings; Industrial Castings; Unicast; Power Controls

Midland-Ross Co. was an American steel, aerospace products, electronics, and automobile components manufacturer which existed from 1894 to 1986.

Founded as Parish & Bingham, a manufacturer of steel components for bicycles, streetcars, and horse-drawn wagons, it merged with the Detroit Pressed Steel Co. in 1923 to form the Midland Steel Products Co. It then merged with the J. O. Ross Engineering Co. in 1957 to form Midland-Ross. A major downturn in the automobile industry in the early 1980s led the company to spin off most of its divisions, leaving it with just aerospace, electronics, small metal castings, and thermal processes. It was purchased and dismantled by Forstmann Little & Company in 1986.

== Predecessor companies ==
Parish & Bingham was a manufacturer of small steel items such as metal dies, metal type, rings, and watch cases founded in September 1894 in Cleveland, Ohio. The company began producing currycombs in 1900, and bicycle and automobile frames in 1904. Automobile frames became the company's chief business by 1907. The company was incorporated and became a publicly traded corporation on December 29, 1911. It was reorganized under the laws of New York on July 31, 1919.

In 1909, the Detroit Pressed Steel Company was formed in Detroit, Michigan. It manufactured automobile and truck frames, as well as stamped steel products.

=== Midland Steel Products ===
On March 21, 1923, Parish & Bingham and the Detroit Pressed Steel Co. merged to form a new company, Midland Steel Products. The merger was complete in mid-May 1923, making Midland Steel Products the largest automobile frame manufacturer in the United States. In 1927, the company invented the first four-wheel brake, and began to manufacture automobile and truck brakes.

By 1954, Midland Steel Products had annual sales of $54.64 million ($655,070,632 in 2025 dollars), making it the 12th largest company with headquarters in Cleveland and the 458th largest company in the entire United States. Three years later, it had annual sales of $72 million ($825,355,450 in 2025 dollars), and it ranked as the 428th largest company in the entire United States.

On October 16, 1957, Midland Steel Products announced it was merging with the J. O. Ross Engineering Corporation, a designer and manufacturer of atmospheric control plants for factories; finishing and painting apparatus; coating and printing equipment for paper, sheet plastic, and tires; and a wide array of couplings, joints, valves, and similar fittings. Ross Engineering had sales of about $28 million in 1956. The merger was approved by Midland stockholders on November 26, and the new company took the name Midland-Ross Corporation. Ross Engineering brought several subsidiaries to the deal, including the John Waldron Corp., which manufactured paper processing machinery.

== Midland-Ross ==
Midland-Ross embarked on a wide-ranging and rapid expansion in its business in the late 1950s and the 1960s.

=== Late 1950s expansion and contraction ===
By the end of 1957, Midland-Ross owned 11 manufacturing plants, in which it made automobile frames, brakes, miscellaneous automotive products, and atmospheric control devices for factories. It ended the year with $100 million ($1,146,327,014 in 2025 dollars) in sales. In March 1958, the company purchased the Hartig Engine & Machine Co. of Mountainside, New Jersey, for $1.2 million ($13,391,003 in 2025 dollars). The firm designed and manufactured thermoplastic extruding machinery. Eight months later, Midland-Ross acquired the Transportation Equipment Division of Consolidated Metal Products Co. The company made door controls and air- and pneumatic-powered doors for buses, railroad passenger cars, and subway cars.

The automobile frame manufacturing business of Midland-Ross suffered significant setbacks. The company closed its plant in Detroit in 1959 after automaker Chrysler declined to renew a contract with the company to make frames for its Dodge and De Soto brands. About 1,400 employees were laid off. Chrysler than canceled its contract with Midland-Ross to provide frames for its Chrysler cars and trucks. This forced Midland-Ross to close its Chicago, Illinois, plant a few months later and lay off 2,500 employees.

In April 1959, Midland-Ross acquired Nelson Metal Products of Grand Rapids, Michigan, maker of zinc and aluminium die castings. In November 1959, Midland-Ross Corporation bought Surface Combustion for $23 million. The company, maker of industrial furnaces and heat treating equipment, was headquartered in Maumee, Ohio. Sale of the company included its Janitrol and Janitrol Aero divisions, which made heating and cooling products for consumer use and aircraft and missiles, respectively.

=== Early 1960s expansion ===
By 1961, Midland-Ross had 14 plants and about 6,000 employees. In February, it acquired the Industrial Rayon Corporation for $41 million ($441,731,626 in 2025 dollars). The company manufactured Tyrex, a rayon fiber used in automobile tires, and rayon fibers for use in industrial manufacturing and clothing. Midland-Ross purchased the Fandaire division of Yuba Consolidated Industries in February 1962 and merged the company (which made air-cooled condensers and cooling products) with Surface Combustion.

These acquisitions and mergers significantly changed Midland-Ross. In 1956, the company had annual sales of about $72 million and earnings of $2.8 million ($28,606,125 in 2025 dollars). The company then spent roughly $34 million acquiring other companies. By the end of 1961, Midland-Ross had annual sales of $137.6 million ($1,405,786,695 in 2025 dollars), and $5.4 million ($55,168,955 in 2025 dollars) in annual earnings. While nearly 100 percent of its sales came from the manufacture of automobile frames in 1956, this had changed significantly by 1961, with 33 percent of sales from consumer durables, 32 percent from capital goods, 30 percent from automotive products, and 5 percent from aircraft and missile components.

Acquisitions continued. In January 1963, Midland-Ross acquired the J. Leukart Machine Company of Columbus, Ohio, manufacturer of precision machining equipment. In April, it acquired the Steel City Electric Co. of Pittsburgh, Pennsylvania, a manufacturer of electrical cables, junction boxes, and other industrial electrical equipment. That same year, it changed the name of its Midland Brake division to Power Controls. The company had significantly diversified its product line, and now primarily manufactured air and vacuum brake systems, air compressors, brake valves, treadles, and slack adjustors. By 1965, Midland-Ross' sales had risen to a record $210 million ($2,407,286,730 in 2025 dollars). In February of that year, it acquired National Malleable and Steel Castings Co. (a company which made grinding balls, iron and steel castings, and railway equipment) for $30 million ($306,494,192 in 2025 dollars). The purchase included two subsidiaries, Industrial Castings (an iron and steel casting manufacturer) and Capitol Foundry (maker of steel grinding balls for the mining industry).

=== Late 1960s acquisitions ===
Midland-Ross continued to make significant acquisitions throughout the late 1960s, as well as consolidated a number of its divisions.

By 1966, Midland-Ross had sales of $344 million ($3,413,538,462 in 2025 dollars) and earnings of $17.6 million ($174,646,154 in 2025 dollars). In August 1967, it purchased Unicast, a maker of specialty steel castings, for $9.6 million ($92,694,611 in 2025 dollars). The following November, it acquired the Reinforced Plastic Container Corp. of Roxboro, North Carolina. The company made commercial waste management disposal systems, container handling systems, liquid separators, and plastic containers.

In March 1968, Midland-Ross began to consolidate some of its acquisitions into new, larger divisions. It merged Nelson Metal Products and Grand Rapids Bright Metal Co. (a manufacturer of bright chrome electroplating and other finishes) into a new division, named Nelson Metal Products. The company also began to divest some of its assets. In April 1969, Midland-Ross sold Surface Combustion's Janitrol and Webster divisions to Laird, Inc. The sale did not include the Janitrol Aero division, which was retained by Surface Combustion.

In June 1969, Midland-Ross formed a new division, Midrex, and constructed a plant for the new division in South Carolina. The division used a patented natural gas process with the same name to manufacture high-iron content metal pellets for use as ore by the iron and steel smelting industries.

=== Consolidation in the 1970s ===
One of Midland-Ross' last acquisitions came in February 1970, when it gained control of Cameron Machine, a company that made winders, sheeters, and slitters for the paper, plastic, textile, metal, and rubber industries.

Throughout the 1970s, Midland-Ross made a series of consolidations among its divisions and divested itself of assets. It consolidated Ross Engineering, Waldron-Hartig, and Cameron Machine into a new Machinery Division in February 1971; sold Midrex to a West German steel manufacturer, Korf Stahl A.G., in January 1974 for $25 million ($163,208,502 in 2025 dollars); merged Industrial Castings and Unicast into a new division called National Castings in July 1975; spun off Capitol Foundry into a new division called Capitol Castings in July 1975; sold Reinforced Plastic Container to the Youngstown Steel Door Company for $2 million ($11,966,605 in 2025 dollars) in December 1975; and merged Nelson Metal and Grand Rapids Bright Metal into Power Controls in December 1977.

The new division focused on the manufacture of air horns, air reservoirs, control valves, bus door operating systems, load levelers, and aluminum and zinc ornamental and functional die castings like taillight trim, hood ornaments, and name plates. Power Controls was renamed Midland Brake in 1980.

== 1980s divestitures and dissolution ==
By 1981, Midland-Ross had 19 separate divisions, and operated 57 plants in the United States as well as nine other countries. Its annual sales were over $900 million ($3,187,225,476 in 2025 dollars).

During the early 1980s recession in the United States, Midland-Ross suffered significant financial losses as the automotive industry went into decline and orders shrank significantly. The company now began to shed many of its assets. Midland-Ross sold Midland Brake in September 1982 to Echlin, Inc., a brake manufacturer based in Branford, Connecticut. It sold what was left of its steelmaking operations to the specialty steel firm of Lamson and Sessions in 1984. It spun off its National Castings division for $35 million ($104,772,587 in 2025 dollars) into a new company known as National Castings Inc. in April 1985. It then sold Nelson Metal Products to Humphrey Management Corp. for an undisclosed sum the same year.

=== Dissolution ===
The Midland-Ross Corporation was acquired by Forstmann Little & Company, a private equity investment firm, on July 1, 1986, for $450 million ($1,321,721,311 in 2025 dollars). Midland-Ross ceased to exist, and many of its divisions were spun off as stand-alone companies or sold to other firms over the next two decades. (Note: For example, Forstmann, Little sold Surface Combustion to a management group in 1987, making the company independent again. The sale did not include Surface Combustion's Janitrol Aero division, which Forstmann, Little retained as part of its FL Aerospace Corporation. The Steel City division was merged with Fortmann, Little's American Electric. Forstmann, Little sold American Electric to the Thomas & Betts Corporation in 1991 for $432.5 million.)

== Bibliography ==
- Harrelson, Helen; Harsh, Richard W. (1986). 150 Years of Owosso Highlights, 1836-1986. Owosso, Mich.: Richard Harsh & Associates.
- Moody's Analyses of Investments and Securities Ratings Books. New York: Moody Manual Co. 1922.
- Moody's Manual of Railroads and Corporation Securities. Volume 2: K-Z. New York: Moody Manual Co. 1924.
- Ward's Business Directory of U.S. Private and Public Companies. New York: Gale Research Inc. 1995. ISBN 9780810388284.
