= Wattle (steam tug) =

Vessel formerly in commercial service in Victoria Harbour, Melbourne, Australia

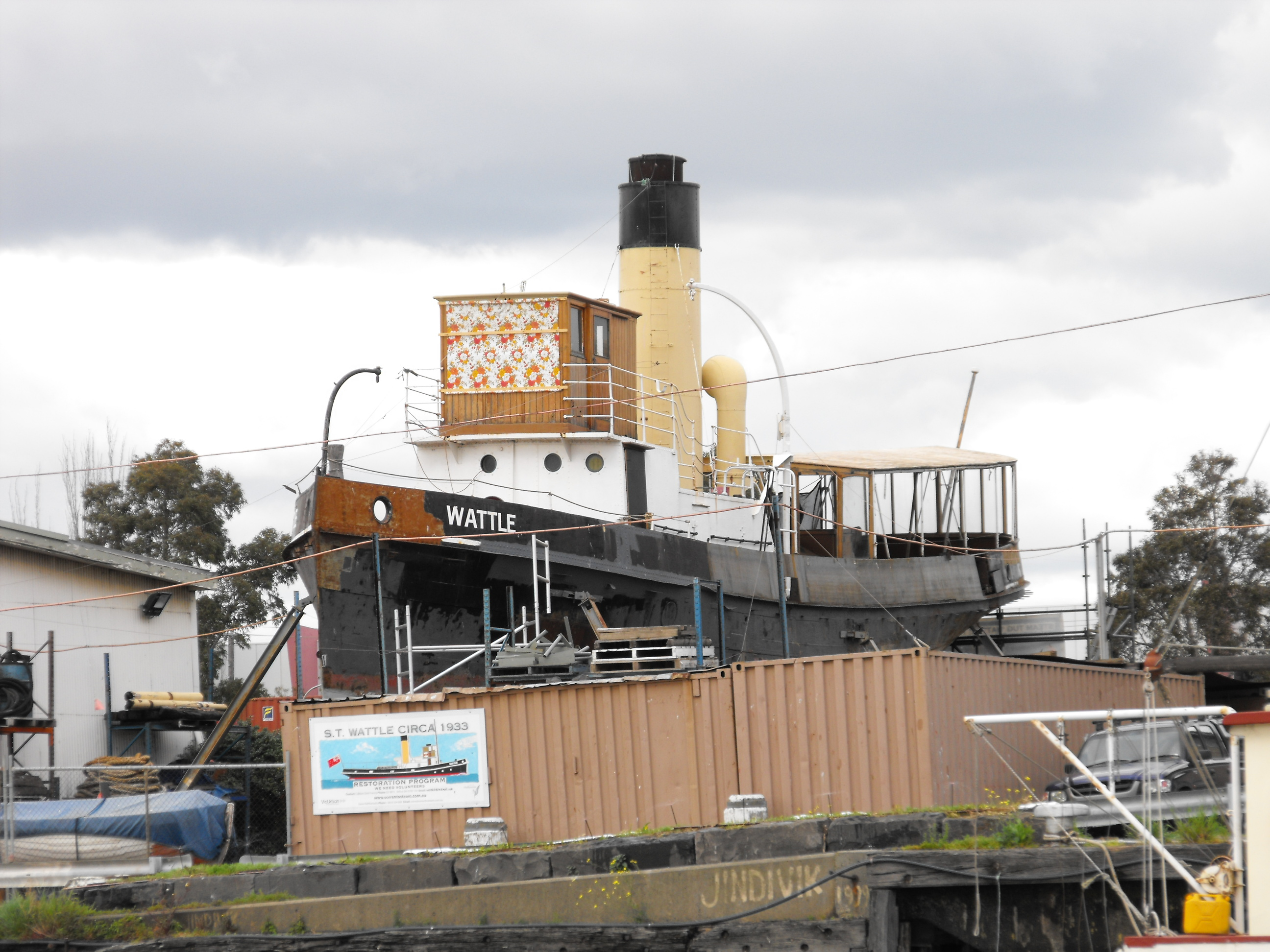
- Steam Tug Wattle undergoing restoration in 2013

History

Australia
- Name: Wattle
- Operator: Royal Australian Navy (1933-1969); Unspecified Sydney-based syndicate (1969-1977); Unspecified Melbourne-based company (1979-2003)
- Builder: Cockatoo Island Dockyard, Sydney
- Completed: 1933
- Status: Undergoing refurbishment

General characteristics
- Type: Tugboat
- Tonnage: 99 gross register tons (GRT)
- Length: 75 ft (23 m)
- Propulsion: Two-cylinder compound steam engine, 100 rpm; Oil-fired, twin-furnace Scotch marine boiler, 130 psi (900 kPa); 7 ft 6 in (2.29 m) propeller
- Speed: 10 knots (19 km/h; 12 mph)
- Capacity: 60 passengers (commercial cruises)
- Crew: 6 minimum

Wattle is a steam-powered tugboat in preservation at Melbourne, in the Australian state of Victoria.

The tugboat was constructed at Cockatoo Island Dockyard on the island of the same name in Sydney Harbour, during the Great Depression as a project to keep shipyard apprentices employed. The tugboat was built with a riveted steel hull, but welding was used for the first time in an Australian shipyard, on the bulkheads and fuel bunkers. The vessel was the first Australian tugboat to be built with an oil-fired compound steam engine.

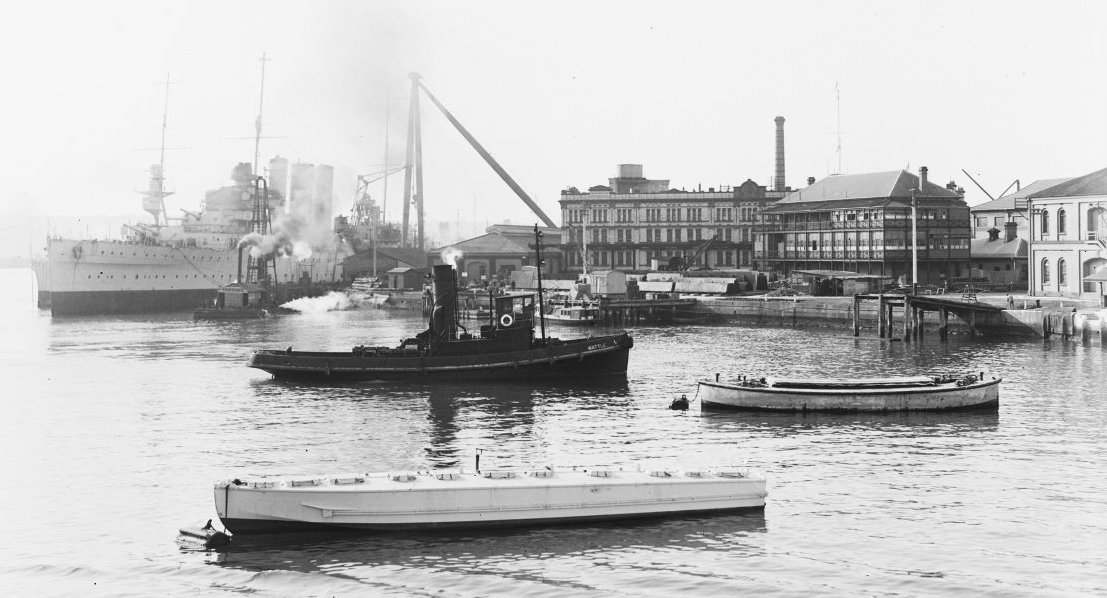
Wattle (centre) off Garden Island naval base in 1939

On completion in 1933, the tugboat was offered to the Royal Australian Navy (RAN). Named Wattle and operated by a civilian crew, the vessel was primarily used in Sydney Harbour for warship towing and manoeuvring at Garden Island naval base, and was also employed as a target tower.

The RAN marked the tugboat for disposal in 1969, and she was purchased by a Sydney-based syndicate, who operated the vessel on tourist cruises around and outside Sydney Harbour. The syndicate kept Wattle operational until 1977, then sold the ship to a Melbourne-based company, which had Wattle towed to Port Phillip in 1979. The tugboat continued to be used for tourist cruises around the bay until 2003, when it failed survey and had to be withdrawn from service.

Wattle was initially moored at Victoria Dock while money was raised to refurbish the vessel, then was relocated to Victoria Harbour during the Docklands redevelopment. In 2007, the Sorrento Steam organisation and the Bay Steamers Maritime Museum joined the project: the former using the restoration of Wattle as a stepping stone towards its own plans to restore steam trams in Sorrento. In 2009, the tugboat was removed from the water and placed on blocks in a temporary shipyard in the Docklands precinct. The intention is to bring the vessel back to survey standard and resume passenger operations.

Wattle was listed by the National Trust as being of national historic significance on 16 June 1993. According to the National Trust, Wattle is the only surviving small harbour steam tug in Australia, and one of only 22 worldwide. It is also one of only eight Australian-built steam-powered ships of any kind remaining. In addition to multiple 'firsts' in construction, the vessel serves as an important example of Depression-era shipbuilding and the transition of technology occurring at this time.

== In popular culture ==
The vessel was used in the highly popular and long-running 1970s-80s Australian television series Prisoner. Prisoner details the lives, struggles and plots of the prisoners and guards ('Screws') in the fictional Wentworth Detention Centre, a high-security women's prison in Melbourne.

Wattle, with name proudly displayed on a life ring, was in episodes 641-643. The plot line was that trainee officers had arranged for work release for four prisoners at a time, under the captain's instructions and guarded by a senior officer. The idea was to for the prisoners to learn ship-maintaining skills and get 'fresh air and sunshine'.

The leader of the female prisoners, 'Top Dog' Rita Connors, plans to use the temporary freedom to kill her rival, a guard called Joan 'the Freak' Ferguson. In episode 642 Rita, who is familiar with all engines, sabotages an inlet valve, disabling the engine, and Wattle drifts for a time.

There are numerous clear film shots of the ship – looking as it was at the time in its role as a day cruiser. One particular segment set to music is of value to researching its appearance c. 1985.
