= HMAS Glenelg (J236) =

Bathurst-class corvette

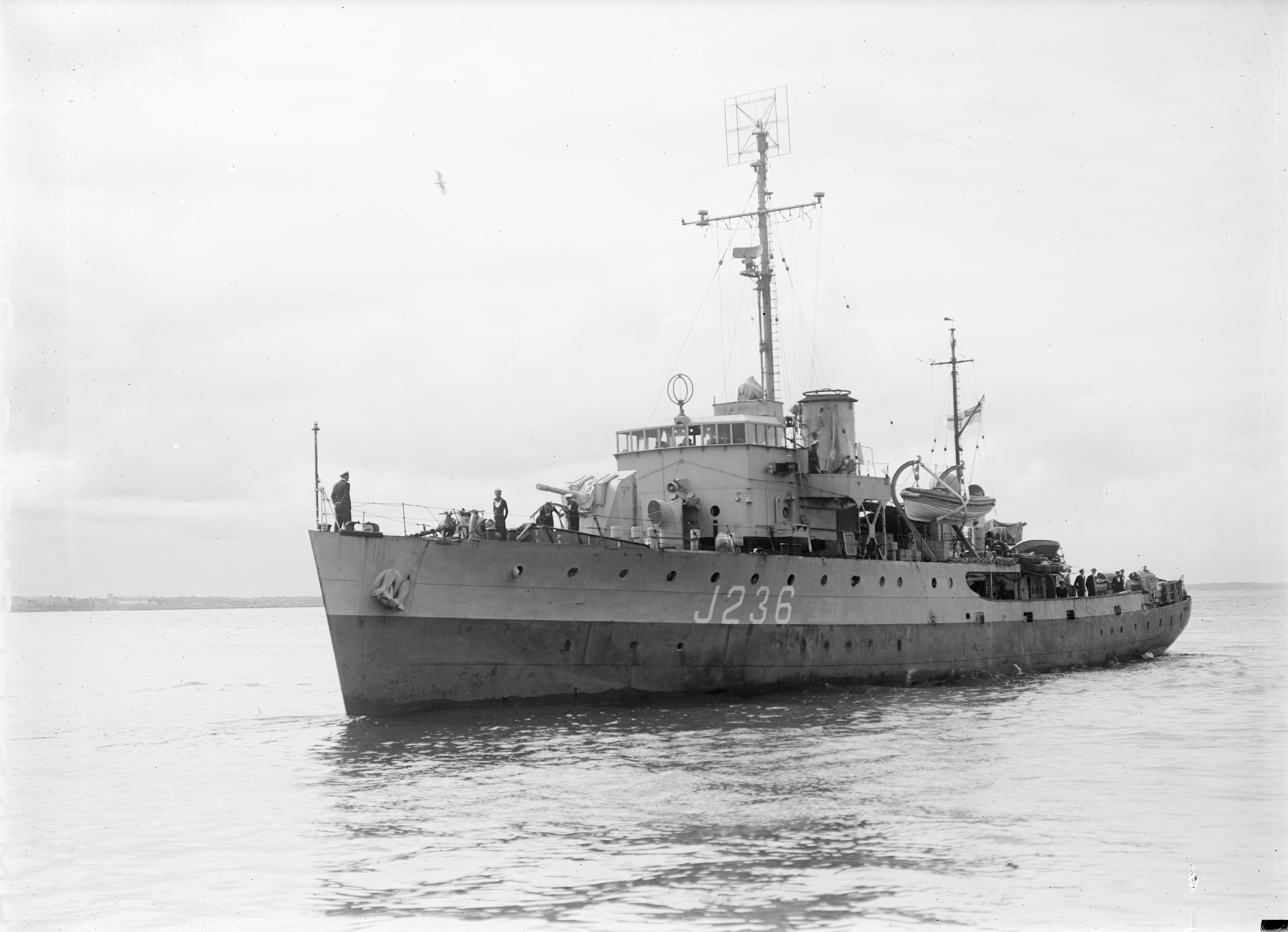
- HMAS Glenelg

History

Australia
- Namesake: Town of Glenelg, South Australia
- Builder: Cockatoo Island Dockyard
- Laid down: 2 March 1942
- Launched: 25 September 1942
- Commissioned: 16 November 1942
- Decommissioned: 14 January 1946
- Honours and awards: Battle honours: Pacific 1942–45; New Guinea 1943–44
- Fate: Sold for scrap in 1957
- Badge

General characteristics
- Class & type: Bathurst-class corvette
- Displacement: 650 tons (standard), 1,025 tons (full war load)
- Length: 186 ft (57 m)
- Beam: 31 ft (9.4 m)
- Draught: 8.5 ft (2.6 m)
- Propulsion: triple expansion engine, 2 shafts
- Speed: 15 knots (28 km/h; 17 mph) at 1,750 hp
- Complement: 85
- Armament: 1 × 4 inch Mk XIX gun; 3 × Oerlikon 20 mm cannons; Machine guns; 4 × depth charges chutes; 2 × depth charge throwers

HMAS Glenelg (J236/M236), named for the city of Glenelg, South Australia, was one of 60 Bathurst-class corvette constructed during World War II, and one of 36 initially crewed and commissioned solely by the Royal Australian Navy (RAN).

== Design and construction ==
In 1938, the Australian Commonwealth Naval Board (ACNB) identified the need for a general purpose 'local defence vessel' capable of both anti-submarine and mine-warfare duties, while easy to construct and operate. The vessel was initially envisaged as having a displacement of approximately 500 tons, a speed of at least 10 knots (19 km/h; 12 mph), and a range of 2,000 nautical miles (3,700 km; 2,300 mi) The opportunity to build a prototype in the place of a cancelled Bar-class boom defence vessel saw the proposed design increased to a 680-ton vessel, with a 15.5 knots (28.7 km/h; 17.8 mph) top speed, and a range of 2,850 nautical miles (5,280 km; 3,280 mi), armed with a 4-inch gun, equipped with asdic, and able to fitted with either depth charges or minesweeping equipment depending on the planned operations: although closer in size to a sloop than a local defence vessel, the resulting increased capabilities were accepted due to advantages over British-designed mine warfare and anti-submarine vessels. Construction of the prototype HMAS Kangaroo did not go ahead, but the plans were retained. The need for locally built 'all-rounder' vessels at the start of World War II saw the "Australian Minesweepers" (designated as such to hide their anti-submarine capability, but popularly referred to as "corvettes") approved in September 1939, with 60 constructed during the course of the war: 36 (including Glenelg) ordered by the RAN, 20 ordered by the British Admiralty but crewed and commissioned as RAN vessels, and 4 for the Royal Indian Navy.

Glenelg was laid down by the Cockatoo Island Dockyard at Sydney, New South Wales on 2 March 1942. She was launched on 25 September 1942 by the wife of Doctor H.V. Evatt, then Minister for External Affairs, and was commissioned into the RAN on 16 November 1942.

== Operational history ==
Glenelg began her career as a convoy escort along the east coast of Australia, initially from Queensland to New Guinea before being assigned to the Sydney to Queensland leg in May 1943. In December, the corvette began a refit.

On completion, she was assigned to New Guinea waters as an anti-submarine patrol and convoy escort ship for the duration of 1944; during this time the ship sailed 42,000 nautical miles (78,000 km) and was active for over 10,000 hours. On 20 October 1944, the corvette was called to assist an American patrol under heavy mortar fire near Maffin Bay in Dutch New Guinea. Glenelg’s whaler was deployed to help move the American wounded; although swampled, the boat was dragged ashore by her crew, with seating and flooring boards used as improvised stretchers to move the wounded to the American-controlled bank of the Woske River. Glenelg, under the guidance of two US Army personnel standing on the beach, fired 31 rounds from her 4-inch (100 mm) main gun at the Japanese attackers, and was later praised by the patrol's senior officer as the decisive factor in allowing the patrol to withdraw with all wounded, leaving five dead behind.

The corvette arrived in Australia at the start of 1945 for a two-month refit in Melbourne, before returning to Manus Island and spending the remainder of the war as a convoy escort. After the end of World War II, Glenelg was involved in the reoccupation of Ambon during September, before departing for Fremantle on 1 November, visiting her namesake city en route.

The corvette earned two battle honours for her wartime service: "Pacific 1942–45" and "New Guinea 1943–44".

== Decommissioning and fate ==
Glenelg was paid off into reserve in Fremantle on 14 January 1946. She was sold to the Hong Kong Rolling Mills on 2 May 1957 for breaking up as scrap.
