= HMAS Koala =

Australian defence vessel

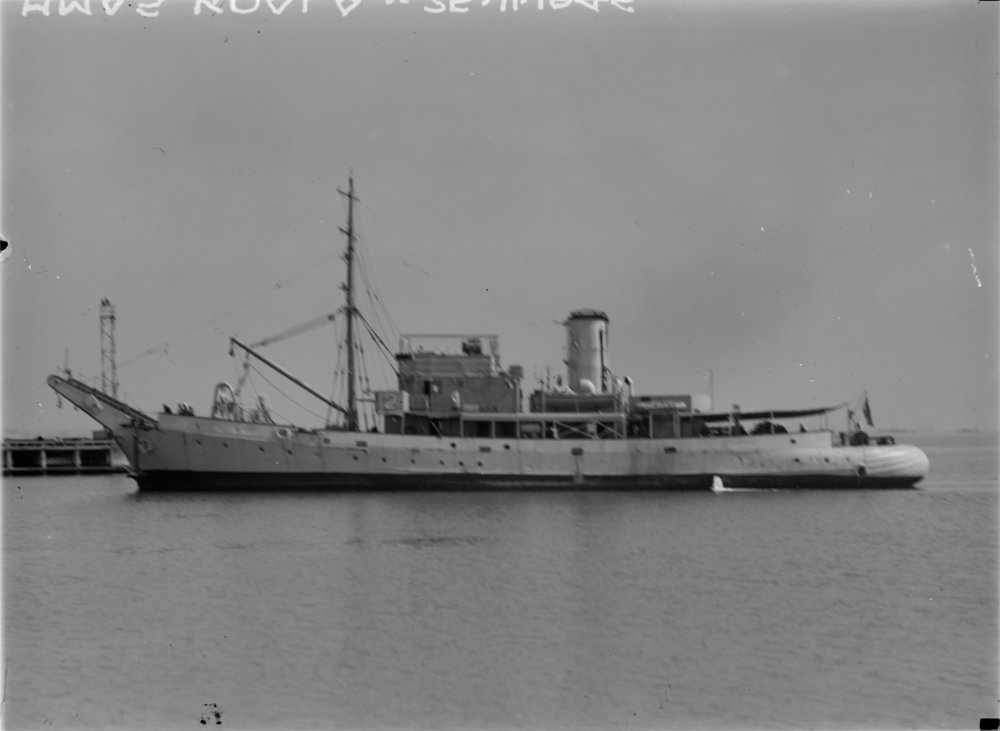
- HMAS Koala in November 1946

History

Australia
- Name: Koala
- Namesake: The Koala
- Laid down: 21 June 1939
- Launched: 14 November 1939
- Commissioned: 7 February 1940
- Honours and awards: Battle honours: Darwin 1942–43
- Fate: Sold into civilian service in 1969

Australia
- Fate: Sunk during floods in 1974

General characteristics
- Class & type: Bar-class boom defence vessel
- Tonnage: 768 tons
- Length: 173.9 ft (53.0 m)
- Beam: 32.3 ft (9.8 m)
- Depth: 11.3 ft (3.4 m)
- Armament: 1 × 12-pounder gun; 1 × .303-inch Vickers machine gun; 1 × .30 inch Marlin machine gun

HMAS Koala was a Bar-class boom defence vessel operated by the Royal Australian Navy (RAN) during World War II. She was constructed by Cockatoo Docks and Engineering Company, Sydney, and launched on 14 November 1939. The ship served in Darwin during World War II, and received the battle honour "Darwin 1942–43". She was sold in 1969 and was sunk during the Brisbane floods in 1974.
