= Tactical deception in animals =

Deception by non-human animals

Tactical deception in animals, also called functional deception, is the use by an animal of signals or displays from an animal's normal repertoire to mislead or deceive another individual.

== Definition ==
Tactical or functional deception is the use of signals or displays from an animal's normal repertoire to mislead or deceive another individual. Some researchers limit this term to intraspecific behaviour, meaning that it occurs between members of the same species.

== Relation to cognitive ability ==
Tactical deception has been used as a measure of advanced social cognition, as it relates to brain function. Primates have larger brains, relative to body size, than in any other mammal except for dolphins, and this size difference is mainly due to an enlarged neocortex. Research has suggested that the evolution of the primate brain is selected-for in highly social species. One study used 18 species with varying brain volumes (three strepsirrhines, four New World monkeys, seven Old World monkeys, and four ape species). The study used the frequency of tactical deception as a measure of social cognition, and it found a strong correlation between the use of social deception and size of the neocortex.

== Taxonomic range ==
=== Cephalopods ===
Among cephalopods, some colour changes in cuttlefish might be called tactical deception, as these fish sometimes present entirely different displays to two different observers. When a male cuttlefish courts a female in the presence of other males, he displays a male pattern facing the female (courtship), and a female pattern facing away, to deceive other males.

=== Birds ===
In an anecdotal account, Simmons reported that a female marsh harrier courted a male to obtain access to food he had stored. She then took this food and fed it to chicks that had been fathered by another male. More extensive studies focused on possibly deceitful behaviour in the pied flycatcher, a species in which males may possess more than one territory. Females gain from mating with a male that has no other mates and males may try to deceive females about their mating status (mated or unmated). Females frequently visit the male, and if he is always alone on his territory he is probably unmated. Thus, by repeated sampling of male behaviour, females are usually able to avoid mating with previously mated males.

Group-foraging common ravens hoard their food in a number of places, and also raid the caches made by others. Cachers withdraw from conspecifics when hiding their food and usually place their caches behind structures, out of sight of potential observers. Raiders remain inconspicuous, keeping at a distance from cachers near their cache sites, but within sight. In response, cachers often interrupt caching, change cache sites, or empty their caches. These behaviours suggest that ravens can withhold information about their intentions, which may qualify as tactical deception. Similarly, if a Eurasian jay (Garrulus glandarius) is being watched by another jay, it tends to cache food behind an opaque barrier rather than a transparent barrier, apparently to reduce the likelihood of other jays pilfering their caches.

=== Mammals ===
In domestic pigs, in a setting where the behaviour of a trained animal could reveal the source of food to another animal, the trained animal spent longer at the food source before other pigs arrived.

Intentional tactical deception has been proposed for mice. In particular, d'Isa et al. have observed that free-living black-striped mice (Apodemus agrarius) perform a peculiar deceptive dodging maneuver to escape from a chaser mouse. The chased black-striped mice enters a single-entrance chamber, hides inside the chamber next to the entrance, waits until the chaser has entered and then, exploiting the distraction of the back-turned chaser, takes the exit to escape in the opposite direction.

=== Primates ===
Observations on great apes have been widely reported as evidence of tactical deception. Several great apes have been trained to use sign language, and in some instances these animals seem to have used language in an attempt to deceive human observers. Koko, a female gorilla, was trained to use a form of American Sign Language. It has been claimed that she once tore a steel sink out of its moorings and when her handlers confronted her, Koko signed "cat did it" and pointed at her innocent pet kitten. Nim Chimpsky was a common chimpanzee trained in American Sign Language. Trainers claimed that when Nim grew bored of learning to sign words, she would sign 'dirty' indicating she wanted to go to the toilet, which caused the trainer to stop the lesson.

Another example involves a chimpanzee approached from behind by a loud aggressive rival. Here, the chimpanzee moved his lips until he lost his fear grin thereby concealing his fear. Only then did he turn around to face the challenger.

Deceit in great apes has been studied under experimental conditions, one of which is summarised by Kirkpatrick:

"...food was hidden and only one individual, named Belle, in a group of chimpanzees was informed of the location. Belle was eager to lead the group to the food but when one chimpanzee, named Rock, began to refuse to share the food, Belle changed her behaviour. She began to sit on the food until Rock was far away, then she would uncover it quickly and eat it. Rock figured this out though and began to push her out of the way and take the food from under her. Belle then sat farther and farther away waiting for Rock to look away before she moved towards the food. In an attempt to speed the process up, Rock looked away until Belle began to run for the food. On several occasions he would even walk away, acting disinterested, and then suddenly spin around and run towards Belle just as she uncovered the food."

Deceptive behaviour has been observed in Old World monkeys including baboons (Papio ursinus). In one of their articles, Byrne and Whiten recorded observations of "intimate tactical deception" within a group of baboons, and documented examples that they classified as follows: A juvenile using warning screams to gain access to underground food storages which otherwise would have been inaccessible; an exaggerated "looking" gesture (which in an honest context would mean detection of a predator) produced by a juvenile to avoid attack by an adult male; recruitment of a "fall-guy" (a third party used by the deceiver to draw attention or aggression); and using one's own movement pattern to draw group-mates away from food caches. Byrne and Whiten also broke these categories into subcategories denoting the modality of the action (e.g. vocalization) and what the action would have signified if observed in an honest context. They noted whether the individual that had been manipulated was in turn used to manipulate others, what the costs had been to the manipulated individual, and whether or not there were additional costs to third parties. Byrne and Whiten expressed concern that these observations might be exceptions, and that such deceptive behaviour s might not be common to the species.

Among New World monkeys, tufted capuchin (Cebus apella) monkey subordinates have been found to employ a vocal form of tactical deception when competing with dominant monkeys over valuable food resources. They use alarm calls normally reserved for predator sightings— either barks (used specifically for aerial stimuli), peeps, or hiccups— to elicit a response in fellow group members and then take advantage of the distraction to pilfer food. In a series of experiments directed by Brandon Wheeler a group of tufted capuchin monkeys was provided with bananas on feeding platforms. Here, subordinate monkeys made nearly all of the alarm calls that could be classified as false, and in many of the false alarms, the caller was on or within two meters of the feeding platform. The calls made dominant monkeys leave the platform while the subordinate caller stayed behind to eat.

== Costs ==
Withholding information, a form of tactical deception, can be costly to the deceiver. For example, rhesus monkeys discovering food announce their discoveries by calling on 45% of occasions. Discoverers who fail to call, but are detected with food by other group members, receive significantly more aggression than vocal discoverers. Moreover, silent female discoverers eat significantly less food than vocal females. Presumably because of such costs to deceivers, tactical deception occurs rather rarely. It is thought to be more common in forms and species where the cost of ignoring the possibly deceptive act is even higher than the cost of believing. For example, tufted capuchin monkeys sometimes emit false alarm calls. The cost of ignoring one of these calls could be death, which may lead to a "better safe than sorry" philosophy even when the caller is a known deceiver.
