= Comsteel =

Australian steel product manufacturer

- Formerly: Commonwealth Steel Company; Vickers Commonwealth Steel Products; Commonwealth Steel Products
- Industry: Steel
- Founded: 1918
- Founder: Clyde Engineering; Goninan & Co; Pioneer Spring Co; Ritchie Brothers
- Headquarters: Newcastle, New South Wales, Australia
- Parent: American Industrial Partners
- Website: www.comsteel.com

Comsteel is an Australian manufacturer of steel products based in the Newcastle suburb of Waratah. It is a subsidiary of American Industrial Partners.

== History ==
Comsteel was founded as Commonwealth Steel Products in 1918 by Clyde Engineering, Goninan & Co, Pioneer Spring Co and Ritchie Brothers to manufacture wheels, tyres, axles and steel castings for railway use.

A plant was established in the Newcastle suburb of Waratah with Howard Smith acquiring a shareholding. After Vickers acquired a shareholding, in 1923 it was renamed Vickers Commonwealth Steel Products. In the 1930s, BHP gradually bought out the other shareholders and it became the Commonwealth Steel Company. In 1959, a mill was opened in Unanderra for the cold rolling of stainless steel. In 1971, Comsteel was licensed by Midland-Ross to produce couplers, draft gears and freight wagon bogies.

In 1983, Commonwealth Steel Company and the Australian subsidiary of Vickers merged to form Comsteel with BHP and Vickers each holding 38% shareholdings. In 1985 Comsteel was purchased by Australian National Industries (ANI).

It was included in the 1999 takeover of ANI by Smorgon Steel which in turn was purchased by OneSteel in 2007. Since 2016 it has been owned by American Industrial Partners.
