= Australian National Industries =

Defunct Australian heavy engineering company

- Type: Public
- Founded: 1911
- Founder: John McGrath
- Defunct: 1999
- Fate: Acquired by
- Successor: Smorgon Steel
- Headquarters: Sydney, Australia
- Revenue: $2.05 billion (1997/98)
- Net income: $73 million (1997/98)
- Number of employees: 7,000
- Website: www.ani.com.au

Australian National Industries was an Australian heavy engineering company with a diverse range of holdings.

== History ==
In 1911 John McGrath began to sell motor vehicles. It operated the first public garage in New South Wales. The company held motor vehicle franchises for many makes of cars. In 1929, it diversified into importing steel and engineering equipment. In the mid-1930s production of drop forgings commenced with motor dealerships opening in other states.

In the early 1940s, the largest forging plant in Australia was opened in Lidcombe, producing forgings for the aircraft and munitions industry. Activities expanded and diversified to include general engineering. In February 1951 John McGrath Industries Limited was listed on the Sydney Stock Exchange. It was renamed Australian National Industries in 1956.

Having acquired a 20% shareholding in ANI, Kerry Packer's Australian Consolidated Press (ACP) launched a takeover offer in April 1989. ACP gained control with a 48% shareholding in June 1989.

In 1991, ACP sold its struggling European waste management company ABT to ANI for $2 million, a decision which was not disclosed to ANI shareholders. Two weeks later, Packer, who had already reduced his shareholding in ANI from 48% to 30%, sold his remaining stake, making a $200 million profit. ABT had signed a contract to build a $150 million waste treatment facility in Madrid which some observers thought was more likely to cost about $400 million. In 2006, it was estimated that the final losses from ANI's venture into European waste management approached $1 billion.

In 1997, Bob Ellicott QC conducted an independent enquiry into the circumstances surrounding the sale of ABT to ANI, but his report was never made public by the corporate regulator, the Australian Securities & Investments Commission, because the ANI board claimed it was defamatory.

In October 1998, Evans Deakin Industries, that held a 5% shareholding in ANI, announced its intention to launch a takeover offer. In December 1998, Smorgon Steel launched a counter takeover offer that was successful, with ANI delisted from the Australian Securities Exchange on 17 March 1999.

== Subsidiary companies ==
- Spedley Holdings
- Bradken
- Coates Hire
- Cockatoo Docks & Engineering Company
- Comeng
- Comsteel
- Queensland Bus Builders
- Union Carriage & Wagon
