= Surface Combustion =

Surface Combustion, Inc.
- Type: Private
- Industry: Industrial furnaces and heat processing equipment
- Founded: 1915; 111 years ago in Toledo, Ohio, U.S.
- Headquarters: Maumee, Ohio, U.S.
- Key people: William J. Bernard, Jr., chairman and chief executive officer; William J. Bernard III, president
- Website: SurfaceCombustion.com

Surface Combustion, Inc. is a North American manufacturer of industrial furnaces and heat treating equipment headquartered in Maumee, Ohio, in the United States. The company was founded in 1915 and purchased by the Midland-Ross Corporation (a steel manufacturer) in 1959. Midland-Ross was acquired by the private equity investment firm of Forstmann Little & Company in 1986, which spun off Surface Combustion to four long term employees in 1987. It was later sold to the Bernard family in 1999. The company has been called "the IBM of the automotive industry" due to its prominence in providing equipment used to heat-treat automobiles parts.

== History ==
=== Early years ===
Surface combustion is an engineering term which refers to process whereby a gaseous fuel is premixed with enough oxygen so that both the fuel and the oxygen are nearly completely used up.

Some time prior to 1913, natural gas salesman Henry O. Loebell incorporated the Improved Appliance Company, which manufactured industrial furnaces. Taking advantage of recent advances in combustion research, Loebell changed the name of his corporation to Surface Combustion Corporation in 1915 and expanded into natural gas burning generators and industrial combustion systems.

The firm was initially headquartered in The Bronx, New York, but in October 1924 oil industry executive Henry L. Doherty purchased Surface Combustion and merged it with his own natural gas industrial appliance company, Combustion Utilities Corp., under the name Henry L. Doherty & Co. Doherty moved the company's headquarters to Toledo, Ohio, in 1928, where he believed the company would thrive due to a closer proximity to the Midwest's manufacturing centers and easy access to the large number of engineers being produced by the region's colleges and universities.

In 1930, Surface Combustion purchased the Chapman-Stein Company, a subsidiary of the C.J. Cooper-Bessemer Company of Ohio Cooper Bessemer and the Columbus Heating and Ventilating Company, a manufacturer of industrial and consumer gas heating and cooling equipment. In 1927, Surface Combustion introduced the Janitrol brand of home heating and cooling appliances. By 1940, Janitrol had expanded into the aircraft and aerospace industries, providing small, self-contained petroleum- and gas-powered heating, de-icing, and other units. By the late 1950s, Janitrol was providing heat-treating equipment for missiles and space launch vehicles as well as military and civilian aircraft, in addition to its aerospace and aircraft heating and cooling units.

=== Midland-Ross years ===
In November 1959, steel manufacturer Midland-Ross Corporation bought Surface Combustion for $23 million. Midland-Ross purchased the Fandaire division of Yuba Consolidated Industries in February 1962 and merged it with Surface Combustion.

In April 1969, Midland-Ross sold Surface Combustion's Janitrol and Webster divisions to Laird, Inc. The sale did not include the Janitrol Aero division, which was retained by Surface Combustion. In the 1970s, Surface Combustion began developing furnaces for the destruction of chemical weapons under a contract awarded by Edgewood Arsenal.

Surface Combustion's business began to suffer after the late 1970s as orders for heat-treated metal products, heating equipment, and cooling equipment fell during the early 1980s recession.

=== Forstmann, Little years ===
On July 1, 1986, the private investment firm Forstmann Little & Company acquired Midland-Ross for $450 million. By this time, Surface Combustion owned more than 500 patents and had installed about 250,000 heat-treating and industrial furnace appliances worldwide.

Forstmann, Little did not retain control of Surface Combustion for long. In 1987, the investment firm sold Surface Combustion to a consortium consisting of Surface Combustion management. The sale did not include Surface Combustion's Janitrol Aero division, which Forstmann, Little retained as part of its FL Aerospace Corporation.

=== Independence again ===
Surface Combustion moved into a 37,000-square-foot (3,400 m^{2}) headquarters in Maumee, Ohio, in 1988. At the time the company was spun off from Forstmann, Little, it had about 150 employees—about 20 of which worked on research and development. It opened a new factory for the manufacture of heat-treating equipment and furnaces in Waterville, Ohio, in 1991.

As an independent firm, Surface Combustion grew swiftly. It moved into another new headquarters, 40,000-square-foot (3,700 m^{2}) in size, in 1990. In 2004 and again in 2010, the company won contracts to produce furnaces and decontamination devices for chemical weapons.

== About the firm ==
As of 2015, Surface Combustion, Inc. primarily manufactured industrial furnaces and equipment to heat-treat metal products. Its equipment was used in the automotive, energy production, farming, and mining industries. Some of the equipment is purpose-designed, and requires on-site assembly. The company had about 100 employees and annual sales of $40 million to $50 million. It sold equipment in 40 to 50 countries, and owned more than 675 patents.

Tim Levy, president of Industrial Steel Treating, has called Surface Combustion "the IBM" of automobile manufacturing for the critical role their heat-treating equipment plays in the industry.

== Products ==
Surface Combustion manufactures equipment utilized for batch production or continuous production for various heat treating processes, including hardening, annealing, normalizing, gas carburizing, carbon restoration, carbonitriding and ferritic nitrocarburizing. It also manufactures custom furnaces for the destruction and elimination of chemical weapons and munitions. The company holds more than 675 patents and over 75 trademarks.

== Bibliography ==
- Battle, Thomas P. (2014). "Sustainability in Ironmaking: The Rise of Direct Reduction". In Mackey, Phillip J.; Grimsey, Eric J.; Jones, Rodney T.; Brooks, Geoffrey A. (eds.). Celebrating the Megascale: Proceedings of the Extraction and Processing Division Symposium on Pyrometallurgy in Honor of David G.C. Robertson. Hoboken, N.J.: John Wiley & Sons. ISBN 9781118889619.
- Harris, Wade N. (1964). Midland-Ross Corporation: A Story of Diversification (Report). New York: Newcomen Society in North America.
- National Research Council (2007). "2 Potential Problems Relating to Obsolescence in Chemical Demilitarization Processing Operations". Assessment of the Continuing Operability of Chemical Agent Disposal Facilities and Equipment (Report). Washington, D.C.: The National Academies Press.
- Ward's Business Directory of U.S. Private and Public Companies. New York: Gale Research Inc. 1995. ISBN 9780810388284.
