= HMAS Goulburn =

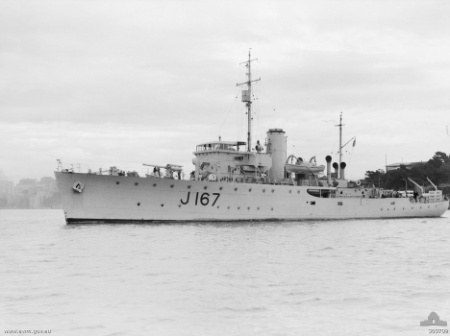
- HMAS Goulburn in 1941

History

Australia
- Namesake: City of Goulburn, New South Wales
- Builder: Cockatoo Island Dockyard
- Laid down: 10 July 1940
- Launched: 16 November 1940
- Commissioned: 28 February 1941
- Decommissioned: 27 September 1946
- Honours and awards: Battle honours; Pacific 1942–44; New Guinea 1942–44
- Fate: Sold for scrap in 1947
- Badge

General characteristics
- Class & type: Bathurst-class corvette
- Displacement: 743 tons (standard), 1,025 tons (full war load)
- Length: 186 ft (57 m)
- Beam: 31 ft (9.4 m)
- Draught: 8.5 ft (2.6 m)
- Propulsion: triple expansion engine, 2 shafts, 1,750 hp
- Speed: 15 knots (28 km/h; 17 mph) at 1,750 hp
- Complement: 85
- Armament: 1 × 4 inch Mk XIX gun, 3 × Oerlikon 20 mm cannons, 2 × Lewis .303 machine guns, 2 × Vickers .303 machine guns, Depth charges chutes and throwers

HMAS Goulburn (J167/B243/A117), named for the city of Goulburn, New South Wales, was one of 60 Bathurst-class corvettes constructed during World War II, and one of 20 ordered by the British Admiralty but subsequently manned and commissioned solely by the Royal Australian Navy (RAN).

== Design and construction ==
In 1938, the Australian Commonwealth Naval Board (ACNB) identified the need for a general purpose 'local defence vessel' capable of both anti-submarine and mine-warfare duties, while easy to construct and operate. The vessel was initially envisaged as having a displacement of approximately 500 tons, a speed of at least 10 knots (19 km/h; 12 mph), and a range of 2,000 nautical miles (3,700 km; 2,300 mi) The opportunity to build a prototype in the place of a cancelled Bar-class boom defence vessel saw the proposed design increased to a 680-ton vessel, with a 15.5 knots (28.7 km/h; 17.8 mph) top speed, and a range of 2,850 nautical miles (5,280 km; 3,280 mi), armed with a 4 inch Mk XIX gun, equipped with asdic, and able to fitted with either depth charges or minesweeping equipment depending on the planned operations: although closer in size to a sloop than a local defence vessel, the resulting increased capabilities were accepted due to advantages over British-designed mine warfare and anti-submarine vessels. Construction of the prototype HMAS Kangaroo did not go ahead, but the plans were retained. The need for locally built 'all-rounder' vessels at the start of World War II saw the "Australian Minesweepers" (designated as such to hide their anti-submarine capability, but popularly referred to as "corvettes") approved in September 1939, with 60 constructed during the course of the war: 36 ordered by the RAN, 20 (including Goulburn) ordered by the British Admiralty but manned and commissioned as RAN vessels, and 4 for the Royal Indian Navy.

At 743 tons standard displacement, Goulburn exceeded the designed standard displacement of the Bathurst class ships by 93 tons.

Goulburn was laid down by the Cockatoo Island Dockyard in Sydney, New South Wales on 10 July 1940. She was launched on 16 November 1940 by the wife of Rear Admiral John Gregory Crace, the commander of the Australian Squadron, and was commissioned on 28 February 1941.

== Operational history ==
After entering active service, Goulburn was assigned to minesweeping duties along the east and south-east coasts of Australia, and was one of several ships attempting to locate mines deployed by the German auxiliary cruiser Pinguin and the auxiliary minelayer Passat. Although operating in this role from 23 April to 31 May 1941, the corvette located only a single mine.

On 16 June, Goulburn and sister ship Burnie were assigned to the China Station and sailed to Singapore. The corvettes operated as convoy escorts, minesweepers, and anti-submarine patrol ships until January 1942. Goulburn was then deployed to Batavia and used as a minesweeper and convoy escort throughout the Sunda Islands. On 27 February, the corvette passed the ABDA cruiser force shortly before the beginning of the Battle of the Java Sea. Although removed from the main battle area, Goulburn was attacked by three waves of three Japanese dive bombers, but was undamaged. On 29 February, Goulburn departed for Australia, arriving in Fremantle on 9 March with only seven tons of fuel remaining. The corvette was assigned to convoy escort runs along the Queensland coast until the end of 1943, then entered a three-month refit.

After refitting, Goulburn was deployed to New Guinea waters as an escort and patrol vessel. During June 1944, the corvette supported landings at Dugumu Bay and Sogari Island. On 25 September, native scouts and a US Army Intelligence officer were embarked to be transported to the Malpia Islands. The native scouts were landed on 27 September to assess Japanese troop strength throughout the island group. After the scouts failed to rendezvous with the ship two days later, and following a failed search attempt by six sailors and the US officer, it was assumed that the scouts had been captured. This was confirmed when American PT boats attempted to land troops on the island a few days later, meeting heavy Japanese resistance. Before leaving the area, Goulburn shelled a village on Pegun Island believed to hold Japanese troops. At the start of October, the corvette was tasked with retrieving another native scout group. After several failed attempts to locate the scouts, they were retrieved from Mois Aoeri Island. While returning to the ship, the shore party was able to capture three Japanese soldiers attempting to escape in a canoe. After observing numerous Japanese personnel on shore, and receiving conformation that several hundred Japanese were based on the island, Goulburn opened fire on the main camp. After these operations, the corvette returned to convoy escort duties until December 1944, then returned to Australia.

Goulburn spent the first part of 1945 operating in Australian waters, before returning to New Guinea in May. She spent a month on escort and minesweeping duties, before sailing to Darwin and escorting a floating dry dock to Milne Bay. The corvette remained in New Guinea waters until the end of the war on 15 August. On 30 August, Goulburn and two sister ships escorted a convoy to Hong Kong, arriving on 21 September. The corvette was involved in minesweeping operations throughout Chinese waters, before returning to Sydney in December 1945.

The ship received two battle honours for her wartime service: "Pacific 1942–44" and "New Guinea 1942–44".

== Decommissioning and fate ==
Goulburn was paid off on 27 September 1946. She was sold to Pacific Enterprise Incorporated on 13 October 1947, and after several re-sales, ended up in the possession of the Ta Hing Company of Hong Kong in December 1950. However, a Commonwealth Statutory Order prevented the ship from leaving Australian waters, and she was sold again to John Manners & Co of Sydney in 1953. The corvette was broken up for scrap at Iron Cove in 1953.
