= HMAS Bathurst (J158) =

1940 Bathurst-class corvette

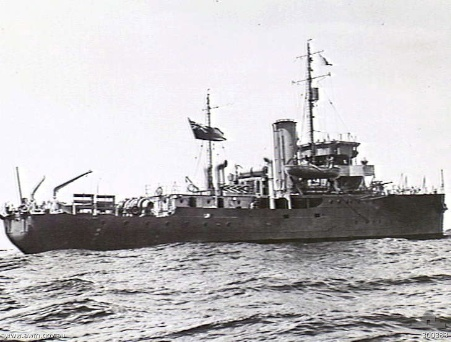
- HMAS Bathurst the day before she was commissioned into service with the Royal Australian Navy

History

Australia
- Namesake: City of Bathurst, New South Wales
- Builder: Cockatoo Island Dockyard in Sydney
- Laid down: 10 February 1940
- Launched: 1 August 1940
- Commissioned: 6 December 1940
- Decommissioned: 27 September 1946
- Motto: "Strike Hard"
- Honours and awards: Battle honours: Indian Ocean 1942–44; Pacific 1945
- Fate: Sold for scrap on 21 June 1948
- Badge

General characteristics
- Class & type: Bathurst-class corvette
- Displacement: 733 tons (standard), 1,025 tons (full war load)
- Length: 186 ft (57 m)
- Beam: 31 ft (9.4 m)
- Draught: 8.5 ft (2.6 m)
- Propulsion: triple expansion engine, 2 shafts, 2,000 horsepower
- Speed: 15 knots (28 km/h; 17 mph) at 1,750 hp
- Complement: 85
- Armament: 1 × 12-pounder gun; 2 × Oerlikon 20 mm cannons; 1 × Bofors 40 mm L/60 gun; Machine guns; Depth charges chutes and throwers

HMAS Bathurst (J158), named for the city of Bathurst, New South Wales, was the lead ship of 60 Bathurst-class corvettes constructed during World War II and one of 20 built for the Admiralty but manned by personnel of and commissioned into the Royal Australian Navy (RAN). Constructed during 1940, the ship spent most of her early career operating with the British Eastern Fleet in the Indian Ocean. She returned to Australian waters in late 1944, then was deployed to New Guinea in 1945, but saw little action. Bathurst was paid off in 1946, and sold to a Sydney scrap merchant in 1948.

== Design and construction ==
In 1938, the Australian Commonwealth Naval Board (ACNB) identified the need for a general purpose 'local defence vessel' capable of both anti-submarine and mine-warfare duties, while easy to construct and operate. The vessel was initially envisaged as having a displacement of approximately 500 tons, a speed of at least 10 knots (19 km/h; 12 mph), and a range of 2,000 nautical miles (3,700 km; 2,300 mi) The opportunity to build a prototype in the place of a cancelled Bar-class boom defence vessel saw the proposed design increased to a 680-ton vessel, with a 15.5 knots (28.7 km/h; 17.8 mph) top speed, and a range of 2,850 nautical miles (5,280 km; 3,280 mi), armed with a 4-inch gun, equipped with asdic, and able to fitted with either depth charges or minesweeping equipment depending on the planned operations: although closer in size to a sloop than a local defence vessel, the resulting increased capabilities were accepted due to advantages over British-designed mine warfare and anti-submarine vessels. Construction of the prototype HMAS Kangaroo did not go ahead, but the plans were retained. The need for locally built 'all-rounder' vessels at the start of World War II saw the "Australian Minesweepers" (designated as such to hide their anti-submarine capability, but popularly referred to as "corvettes") approved in September 1939, with 60 constructed during the course of the war: 36 ordered by the RAN, 20 (including Bathurst) ordered by the British Admiralty but manned and commissioned as RAN vessels, and 4 for the Royal Indian Navy.

Bathurst laid down by Cockatoo Island Dockyard in Sydney on 10 February 1940. She was launched on 1 August 1940 by the wife of the dockyard's Engineer Manager, and commissioned on 6 December 1940 under Lieut-Commander A. V. Bunyan, DSC, RD; RANR(S).

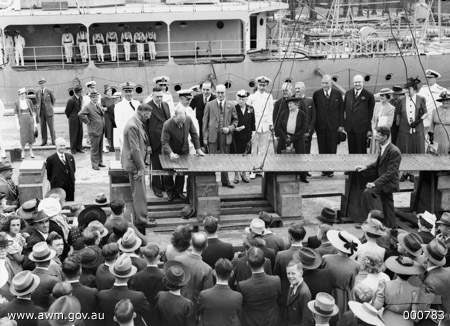
Sir Frederick Stewart riveting the first section of Bathurst's hull during her keel-laying ceremony

== Operational history ==
Bathurst began her career in January 1941 as part of the 21st Minesweeping Flotilla, operating off Australia's east coast. Between March and May, she was assigned as a patrol and escort vessel to Singapore, before proceeding to Colombo and joining the British Eastern Fleet. Bathurst spent the month of June patrolling the Red Sea, then was deployed for three and a half months as a blockade vessel in the Gulf of Tadjoura. During this time, the corvette captured at least three small vessels.

Bathurst returned to Colombo in December, and was used as a patrol vessel and escort between the Indian and African coasts until August 1944. She underwent refit in Colombo from September to November 1943, and was a key component in the rescue and salvage operation following the explosion of two munitions ships at Bombay on 14 April 1944. On 7 August 1944, Bathurst sailed for Fremantle, and performed anti-submarine patrols along the western coast of Australia until April 1945. She was then deployed to New Guinea, but the Allied successes of the Pacific War meant that the remainder of World War II consisted of routine patrols. Two battle honours recognise the ship's wartime service: "Indian Ocean 1942–44" and "Pacific 1945".

Following the conclusion of the war in August 1945, Bathurst was again assigned to the 21st Minesweeping Flotilla, and carried out minesweeping operations in the Hong Kong area.

== Decommissioning and fate ==
Bathurst returned to Sydney on 9 November 1945, and was decommissioned into reserve on 27 September 1946. She was sold for scrap to T. Carr and Co of Sydney on 21 June 1948.
