= Net-class boom defence vessel =

British boom defence vessels

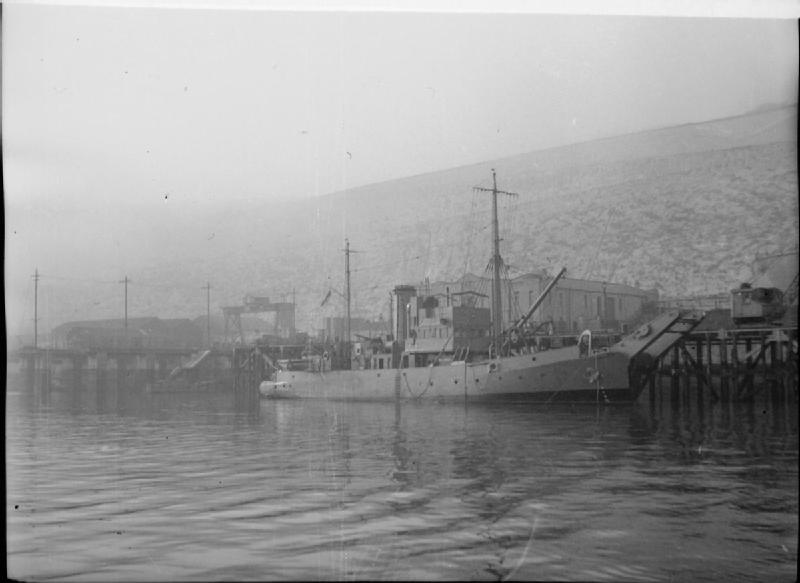
- HMS Falconet

Class overview
- Name: Net class
- Builders: Blyth Shipbuilding & Drydock Co. Ltd., Blyth, Northumberland (6); Smiths Dock Co., Ltd., South Bank, North Yorkshire (2); Lobnitz & Co. Ltd., Renfrew (2); Cockatoo Docks and Engineering Co., Sydney (1)
- Operators: Royal Navy; Royal Australian Navy
- Built: 1938–1939
- In commission: 1939–1958
- Completed: 11
- Lost: 1

General characteristics
- Type: Boom defence vessel
- Displacement: 530 long tons (539 t)
- Length: 159 ft 9 in (48.69 m) o/a; 135 ft (41 m) p/p
- Beam: 30 ft 6 in (9.30 m)
- Draught: 9 ft (2.7 m)
- Propulsion: Reciprocating vertical triple expansion engine, 850 ihp (634 kW); 1 shaft
- Speed: 11.5 knots (21.3 km/h; 13.2 mph)
- Complement: 32
- Armament: 1 × 3 in (76 mm) gun

The Net class were a class of boom defence vessels of the Royal Navy and Royal Australian Navy during World War II.

== Ships ==
Of the eleven ships of the class ten were built in shipyards in northern England and Scotland, while the eleventh was built in Sydney, Australia. One ship, HMS Bayonet, was lost when it struck a mine in the Firth of Forth on 21 December 1939, initially attributed to being laid by the U-21 on 4 November. The second court-martial of HMS Bayonet's skipper found that the mine was part of a British defensive field laid by HMS Plover the day before

=== Royal Navy ===
- HMS Bayonet (Z05)
- HMS Bownet (Z90)
- HMS Burgonet (Z33)
- HMS Dragonet (Z82)
- HMS Falconet (Z19)
- HMS Magnet (Z27)
- HMS Martinet (Z41)
- HMS Planet (Z50)
- HMS Plantagenet (Z63)
- HMS Signet (Z10)
- HMS Sonnet (Z47)

=== Royal Australian Navy ===
- HMAS Kookaburra

== See also ==
- Bar-class boom defence vessel
