= The Riverboat Postman =

Ferry service in New South Wales, Australia

The Riverboat Postman is a ferry service on the Hawkesbury River near the Central Coast in New South Wales, Australia that departs and docks in Brooklyn. The Riverboat Postman delivers mail to remote communities situated along the Hawkesbury River and is the only remaining service of its kind in Australia. A version of the service has been operating since 1910.

== History ==
A version of the Riverboat Postman service began operation in 1910.

In 2012, the former operators of the Riverboat Postman went into liquidation. The service was then taken over by the Pigneguy family.

The service encountered challenged circumstances during the COVID-19 pandemic in New South Wales but they endured and used a Tinnie to reduce their use of fuel and continue delivering mail to communities along the Hawkesbury River.

== Route ==
The starting point for the Riverboat Postman is near the Hawkesbury River railway station.

The Riverboat Postman passes a wreck of the warship HMAS Parramatta and remote communities such as Dangar Island, Milson Island, Bar Point, Peat Island, Marlow Creek, Kangaroo Point, Fishermans Point, Milsons Passage and Spencer.

== Dining ==
Travellers on board the Riverboat Postman are served food including Anzac biscuits, a ploughman's lunch with salad and a tea or coffee.
