= Brooklyn Bridge, New South Wales =

Hawkesbury River Road Bridge
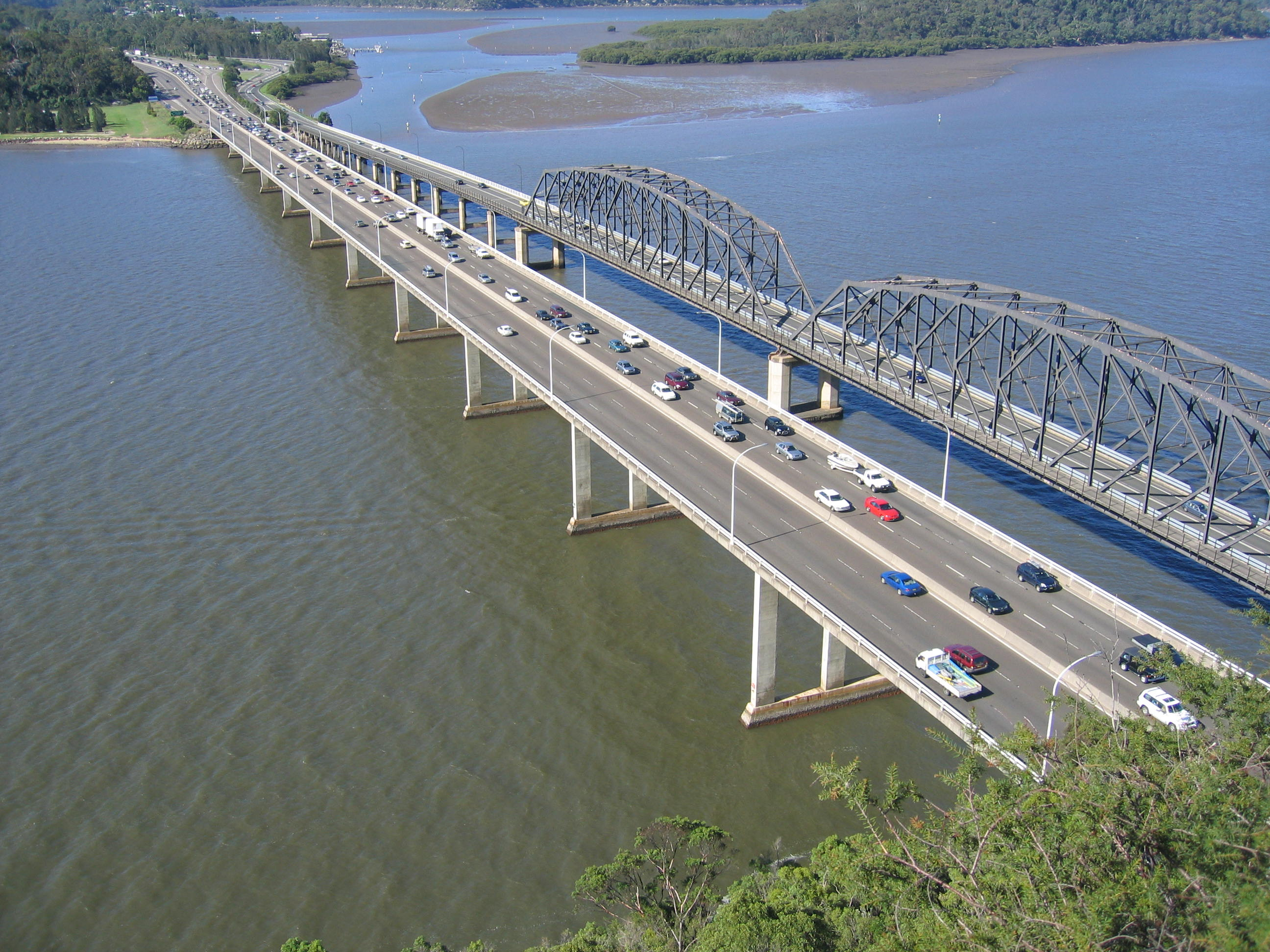
- The Hawkesbury River Road Bridge, pictured to the left carries the Pacific Motorway. The Peats Ferry Bridge on the right carries the Pacific Highway, as they both cross the Hawkesbury River
- Coordinates: 33°32′19″S 151°11′57″E
- Carries: Pacific Motorway: Motor vehicles only
- Crosses: Hawkesbury River
- Locale: Brooklyn, Broken Bay, New South Wales, Australia
- Begins: Kangaroo Point (south)
- Ends: Mooney Mooney Point (north)
- Named for: Brooklyn
- Owner: Transport for NSW
- Followed by: Peats Ferry Bridge

Characteristics
- Design: Girder bridge
- Material: Concrete
- Total length: 600 metres (1,969 ft)
- No. of lanes: 3 northbound and 3 southbound

History
- Designer: Department of Main Roads
- Fabrication by: John Holland; Hornibrook
- Opened: August 1973 (Stage 1); October 1973 (Stage 2)
- Replaces: Peats Ferry Bridge: (Old Pacific Highway – concurrent use)

Location
- Interactive map of Hawkesbury River Road Bridge

The Brooklyn Bridge is a local nickname for the Hawkesbury River Road Bridge, a concrete girder bridge that carries the Pacific Motorway (M1) across the Hawkesbury River between Kangaroo Point and Mooney Mooney Point, located 35 kilometres (22 mi) north of Sydney in New South Wales, Australia. The bridge comprises a dual carriageway with three lanes in each direction of motorway grade-separated conditions.

The adjacent Peats Ferry Bridge carries the Pacific Highway (B83) across the Hawkesbury River in a single carriageway with one lane in each direction in state highway conditions. The Peats Ferry Bridge permits the carriage of pedestrian and bicycles; not permitted on the Hawkesbury River Road Bridge. Both bridges are maintained by Transport for NSW.

== History ==
This bridge was built to connect the sections of the Sydney-Newcastle Freeway immediately north and south of the Hawkesbury River. The section north of the river as far as Mount White was opened in December 1965, and the adjacent freeway section south of the river was opened as far south as Berowra in December 1968. Between 1968 and 1973 freeway traffic was required to rejoin the Pacific Highway in either direction and use the Peats Ferry Bridge (opened in 1945) to cross the river.

It was opened in two stages. The three northbound lanes were opened to traffic in August 1973, and the resulting changes to traffic arrangements (whereby northbound traffic no longer had to join the Pacific Highway to use the adjoining Peats Ferry Bridge to cross the Hawkesbury then diverge to where the freeway recommenced north of the river) allowed the approaches at either end of the three southbound lanes to be completed in October 1973, to bring the full width of the bridge into use.

== Description ==
The bridge is founded on rock at up to 85 metres (279 ft) below water level and the deck is on a 2.1% falling gradient from 21 metres (69 ft) above water level at the southern bank to seven metres (twenty-three feet) at the northern bank. The bridge is 616 metres (2,020 ft) long, and was the first bridge in the world to be built of open steel trough girders.
