= Spectacle Island (Hawkesbury River) =

Island in New South Wales

Coordinates: 33°31′52″S 151°12′41″E

Spectacle Island is a 36.4-hectare (89.9-acre) island in the village of Mooney Mooney in the Hawkesbury River on the Central Coast of New South Wales, Australia. Spectacle Island is located on the junction with Mooney Mooney Creek and the Hawkesbury River.

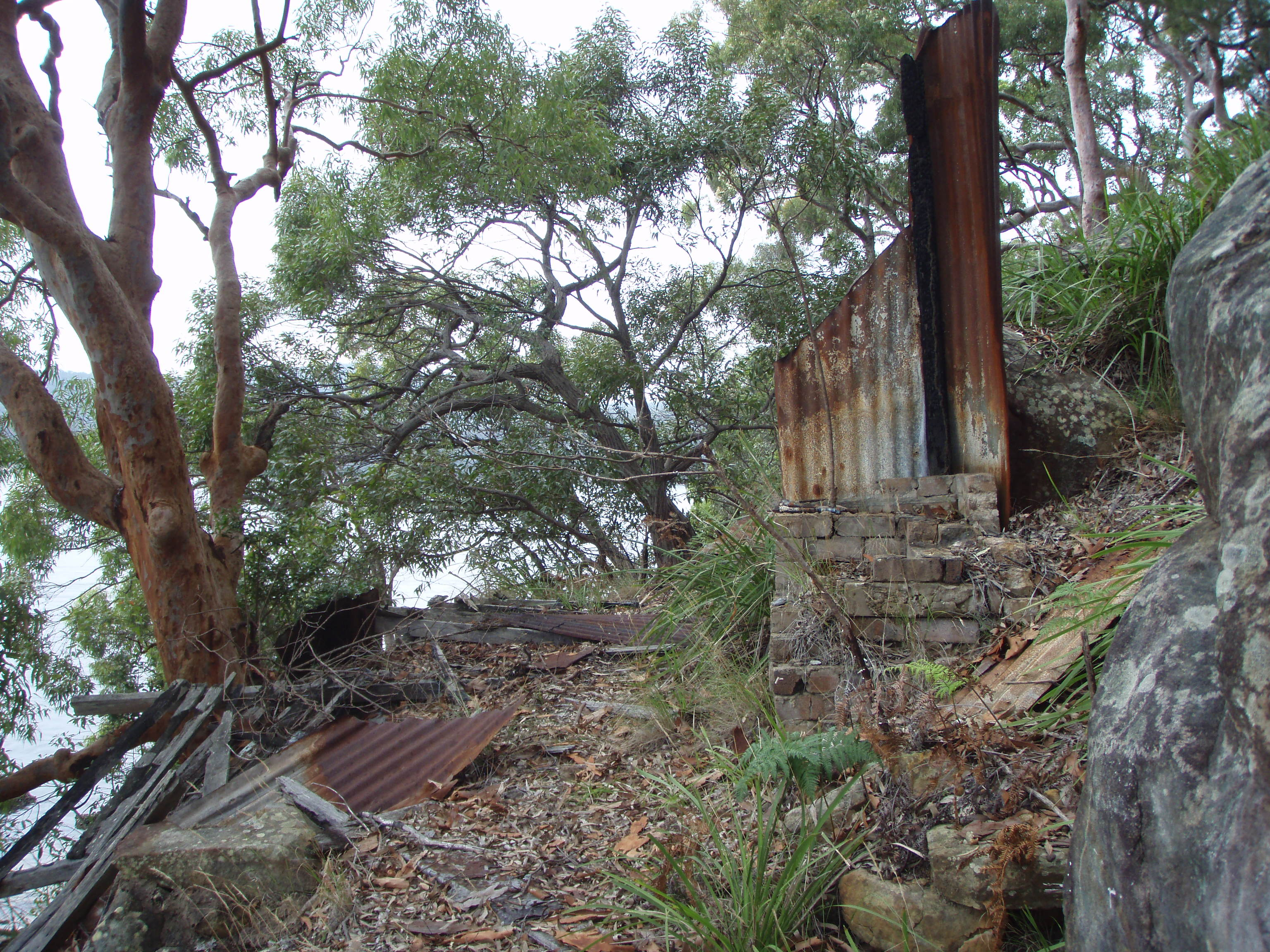
The remains of one of several old shacks on Spectacle Island in 2009

Spectacle Island is one of the two islands located in Mooney Mooney along with Peat Island. It is considered a protected nature reserve precinct and is part of the Brisbane Water National Park.

== History ==
The island was originally known as 'Goat Island', named after a herd of goats that were once kept on the island. Apparently other domesticated animals were also marooned here, as there is one report of an omnivorous cow consuming two flatheads that it had pulled down from a tree where the fisherman had left them to dry, probably in order to supplement the meagre amount of pasture that was available. The name of the island was subsequently changed to Spectacle, although the reason is unclear. It may have been due to the spectacular view from its summit, or maybe due to its resemblance to a monocle.

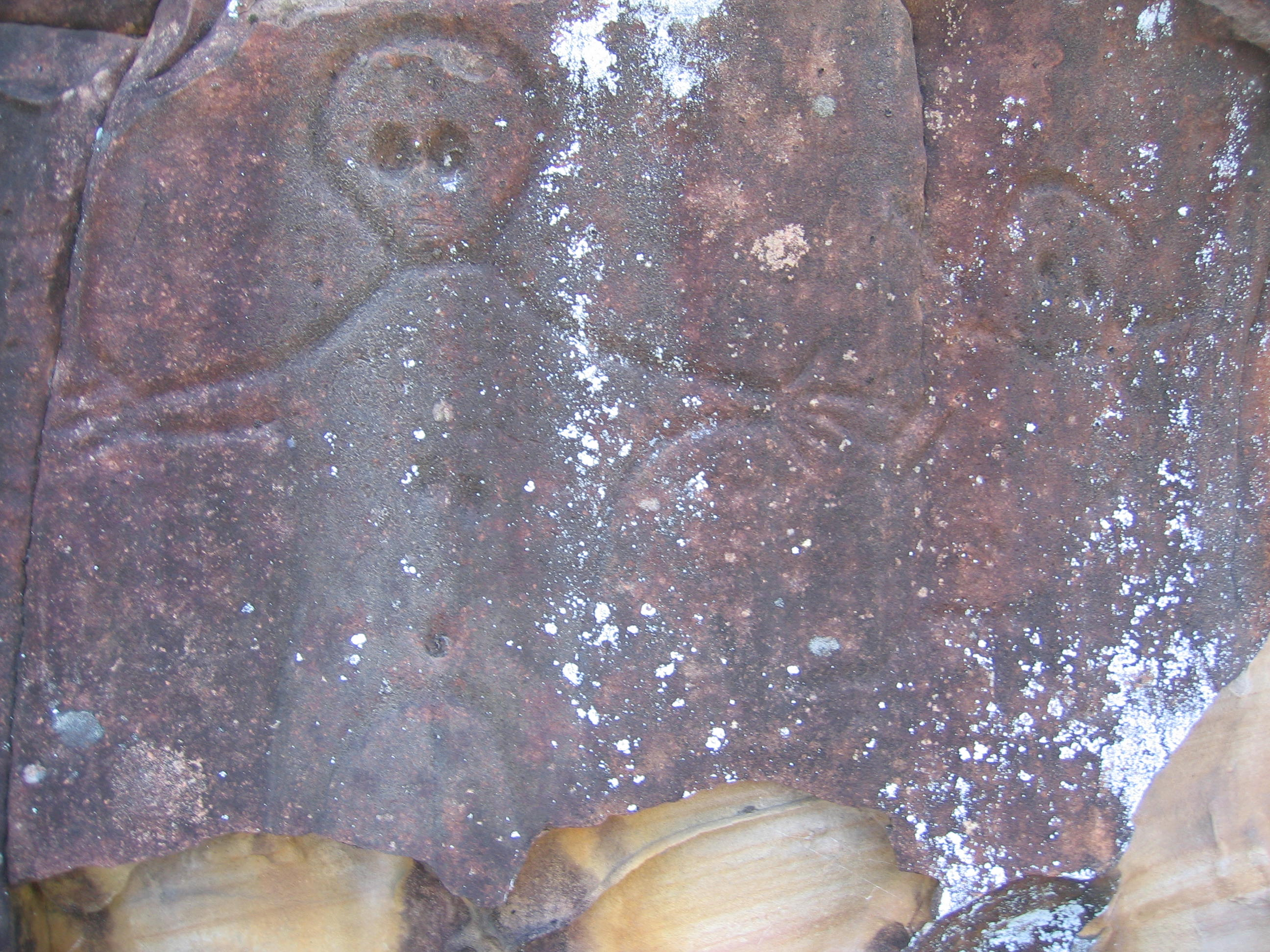
Aboriginal rock art on Spectacle Island

The island was designated a nature reserve in 1972 and was listed on the Register of the National Estate in 1978 for its scientific importance as a remnant of the natural environment of the Central Coast, for the abundance of aboriginal sites it contains, and particularly diverse vegetation. It is managed by the NSW National Parks and Wildlife Service. Spectacle Island was included on the Australian National Heritage List in December 2006.
