= Peats Ferry Bridge =

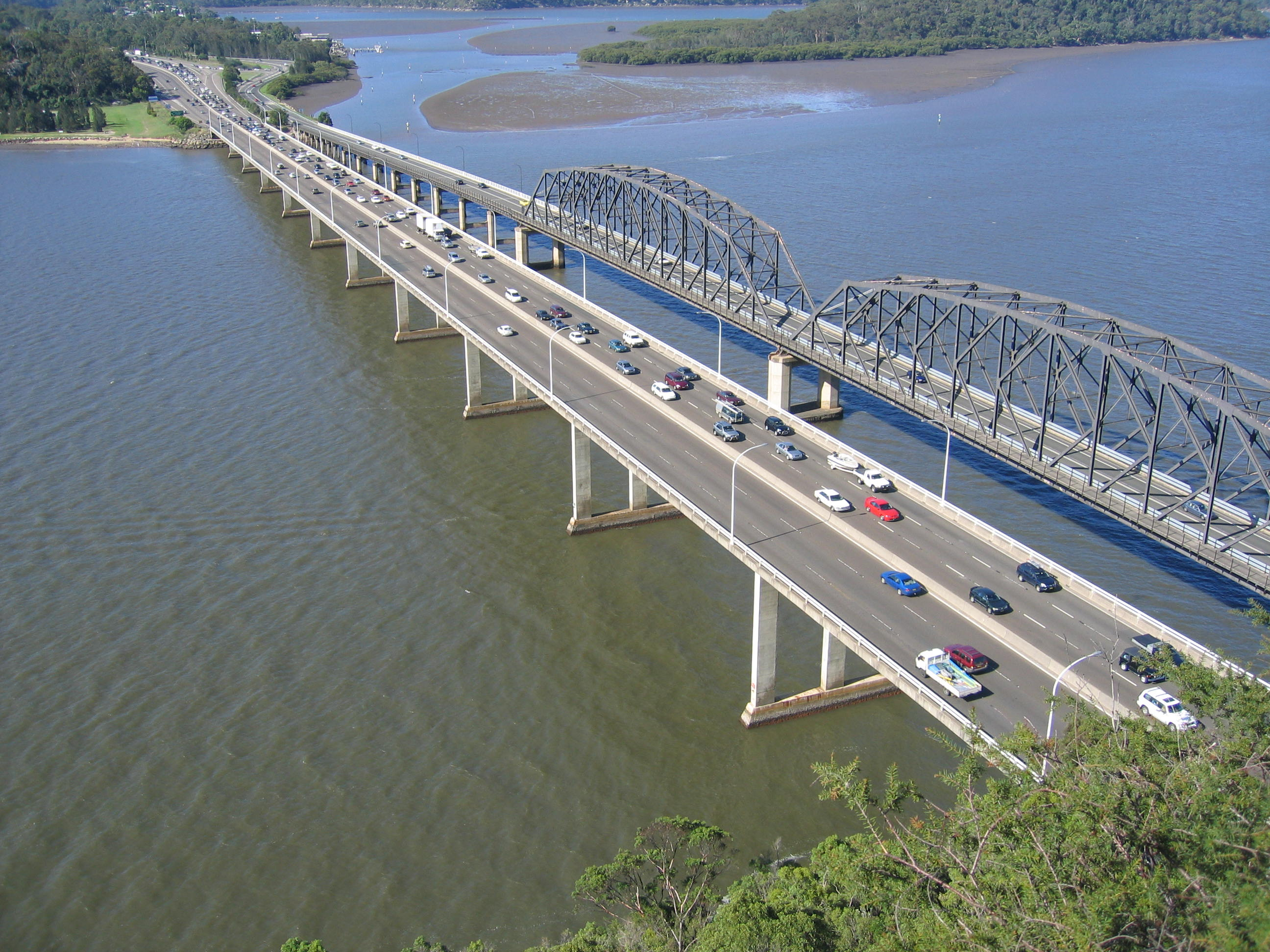
- The Peats Ferry Bridge, pictured to the right, carries the Pacific Highway (B83). The Brooklyn Bridge on the left carries the Pacific Motorway (M1), as they both cross the Hawkesbury River
- Coordinates: 33°32′19″S 151°11′57″E
- Carries: Pacific Highway: Motor vehicles; Pedestrians; Bicycles
- Crosses: Hawkesbury River
- Locale: Brooklyn, New South Wales, Australia
- Begins: Kangaroo Point (south)
- Ends: Mooney Mooney Point (north)
- Named for: George Peat / Peats Ferry
- Owner: Transport for NSW
- Heritage status: NSW State Heritage Register; Roads & Maritime Services heritage and conservation register

Characteristics
- Design: Truss bridge
- Material: Steel
- Total length: 611 metres (2,005 ft 6 in)
- Width: 11 metres (36 ft) road plus footpath
- Water depth: 74 metres (241 ft 4 in)
- Longest span: 134 metres (440 ft)
- No. of spans: 2 main 16 approach
- Piers in water: 2 / 15
- Clearance below: 21 metres (70 ft)

History
- Designer: Department of Main Roads
- Engineering design by: AR Shepley
- Constructed by: Balgue Constructions
- Fabrication by: Clyde Engineering
- Construction start: 1 September 1938
- Construction end: 1945
- Construction cost: A£454,000
- Opened: 4 April 1945
- Inaugurated: 6 May 1945
- Replaces: Peats Ferry
- Replaced by: Brooklyn Bridge (Pacific Motorway – concurrent use)

Location
- Interactive map of Peats Ferry Bridge

The Peats Ferry Bridge is a steel truss bridge that carries the Pacific Highway (B83) across the Hawkesbury River, between Kangaroo Point in Brooklyn and Mooney Mooney Point, located 40 kilometres (25 mi) north of Sydney in New South Wales, Australia. The bridge carries the Hornsby to Kariong section of highway, while the adjacent Brooklyn Bridge carries the Pacific Motorway (M1).

The Peats Ferry Bridge is a single carriageway with one lane in each direction in state highway conditions. It permits the carriage of motor vehicles, pedestrians and bicycles. The adjacent Brooklyn Bridge is a dual carriageway with three lanes in each direction of motorway grade-separated conditions. Both bridges are maintained by Transport for NSW.

== History ==
Peats Ferry, a ferry operated by George Peat from 1847 until the 1890s, provided a local crossing of the Hawkesbury River. At that time there was no direct road between Sydney and Newcastle. The ferry service was made redundant by the completion of the Main Northern railway line in 1889 with the opening of the first Hawkesbury River railway bridge. Between 1925 and 1930 the New South Wales Public Works Department, and subsequently the Main Roads Board, undertook construction of the road between Hornsby and Gosford, in order to provide a direct road route between Sydney and Newcastle. Upon completion of the roadworks in 1930 Peats Ferry was reinstated between Kangaroo Point and Mooney Mooney Point, pending construction of the bridge.

Construction of the bridge commenced in 1938 but it was not completed until May 1945. Prior to construction of the Hornsby-Gosford road via Peats Ferry the most direct road route between Sydney and Newcastle was via the Old Northern Road via Wisemans Ferry and Cessnock, built in the 1820s.

The Sydney-Hornsby-Gosford-Newcastle route was named as part of the Great Northern Highway in 1928, and renamed as part of the Pacific Highway in 1931.

== Description ==
The two main bridge spans are K-trusses of welded steel construction. Each truss span measures 134 metres (440 ft) long and these were the longest welded truss spans in the world when built. The deck of the truss spans in concrete, cast in situ around the truss members. The truss spans were fabricated off site and floated into position on barges, requiring a high degree of accuracy and coordination in fabrication and bridge pier setting out. To the north of the truss spans, the bridge has eight long and eight short steel girder spans. The bridge deck to these spans is also cast in situ concrete but is believed not to act compositely with steel, as might be used in more modern construction.

North of the bridge itself a causeway some 220 metres (722 ft) long was built in shallow water to complete the link to the northern bank.

The Pier supporting the main bridge spans is founded on a concrete caisson. The cutting foot of the caisson was cast on a barge in sheltered water and then floated out and sunk to the river bed within its own cofferdam. Jetting with compressed air and the addition of further sections of caisson then further sank the caisson. At one point the caisson accidentally slid under its own weight to below the water line. To recover this situation a further section had to be added by divers and the caisson pumped out, which took nine months to complete. The final caisson extends 73.56 metres (241.3 ft) below low water level, just 20 centimetres (7.9 in) short of the world record depth for a bridge foundation at that time, held by the San Francisco–Oakland Bay Bridge.

The bridge abutments are cast in situ concrete bearing to rock. Each abutment has concrete walls and parapets (balustrades).

The original railings to the east and west sides of the bridge spans were tubular top and bottom rails supported to steel angle standards with crimped wire mesh infill panels. These original rails still exist to the girder spans of the bridge. The rails to the two truss spans of the bridge were modified in 1966 by the removal of the tubular rails and crimped wire mesh and substitution with Armco type barriers bolted to the original steel angle standards. This was done in conjunction with the reconfiguration of the lanes to provide a third lane for tidal flow arrangements.

The bridge has two plaques at its south abutment commemorating the opening of the bridge in 1945 and the "energy and skill of its builders". A toll was levied on crossing the bridge, payable at the Mooney Mooney Point end of the bridge.

The bridge was superseded as the main crossing of the Hawkesbury River at this point by the opening of the adjacent six-lane motorway bridge as part of the fourth stage of the Pacific Motorway in 1973. It continues in service carrying the Pacific Highway route as a backup and alternative route to the motorway, and provides access from the motorway to the towns of Brooklyn and Mooney Mooney, and to Mount White.

== Heritage significance ==
Peat's Ferry Road Bridge is of State significance owing to its historical associations and technical and engineering qualities. It was constructed between 1938 and 1945 and the current bridge fabric is original to the 1945 construction. The original parapets, however, have been partly removed and have had Armco barriers added over the truss span lengths. The bridge is at the site of the ferry crossing first established by George Peat in 1847. From 1945 until 1980s, when the Sydney to Newcastle Freeway was built, the current bridge provided a direct and vital link from Sydney to the industrial north.

— Statement of significance, Heritage and conservation register, Roads & Maritime Services, 15 August 2005.

The bridge received a Historic Engineering Marker from Engineers Australia as part of its Engineering Heritage Recognition Program.

== See also ==
- List of bridges in Sydney
