= Mooney Mooney Creek, New South Wales =

Coordinates: 33°27′54″S 151°13′05″E

Mooney Mooney Creek
- Suburb
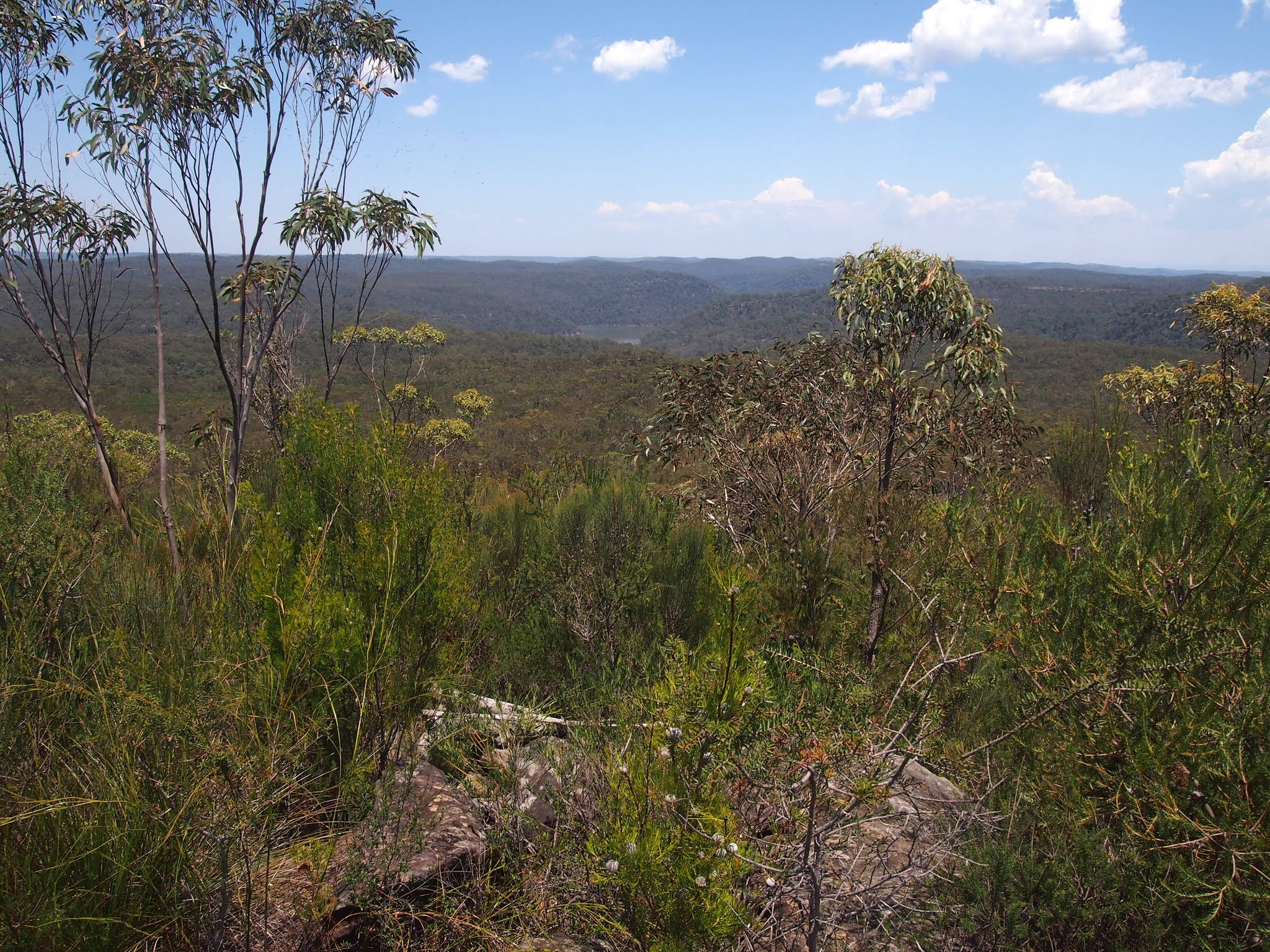
- Mooney Mooney Creek from Scopas Peak, Central Coast
- Country: Australia
- State: New South Wales
- City: Central Coast
- LGA: Central Coast Council
- Location: 60 km (37 mi) N of Sydney; 15 km (9.3 mi) W of Gosford

Government
  - State electorate: Gosford
  - Federal division: Robertson
- Elevation: 152 m (499 ft)

Population
  - Total: 27 (SAL 2021)
- Postcode: 2250
- Parish: Cowan
Suburbs around Mooney Mooney Creek
Mount White	Calga	Kariong
Marlow	Mooney Mooney Creek	Kariong
Bar Point	Cheero Point	Wondabyne

Mooney Mooney Creek is a suburb of the Central Coast region of New South Wales, Australia, located 60 kilometres (37 mi) north of Sydney along both sides of the river after which it is named. It is part of the Central Coast Council local government area.

Almost all of the suburb's land area is part of the Brisbane Water National Park, and the Pacific Motorway and Pacific Highway pass through the west and north of the suburb.

== See also ==
- Mooney Mooney Bridge
