= Cheero Point =

- Suburb
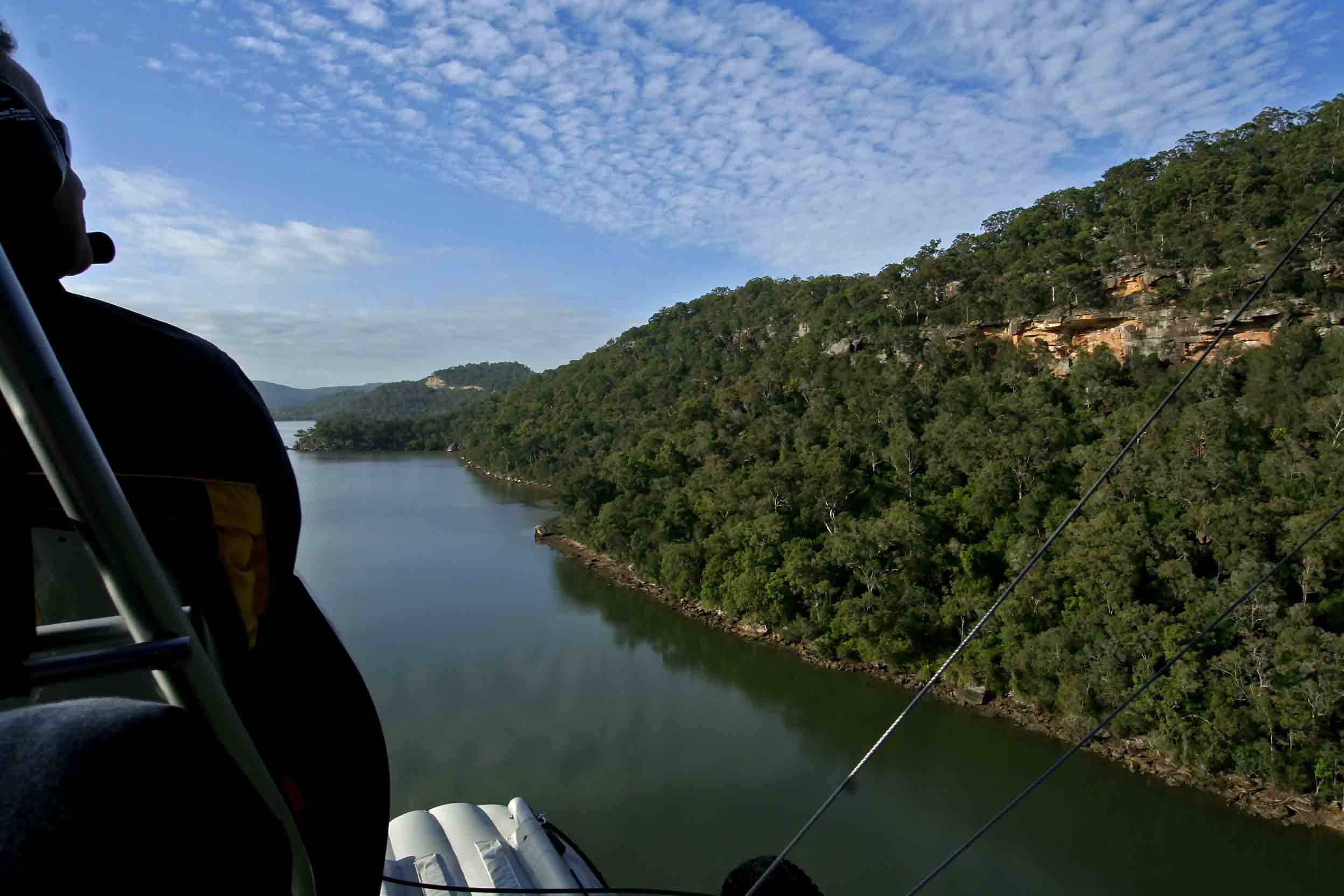

- Interactive map of Cheero Point
- Coordinates: 33°30′40″S 151°11′38″E
- Country: Australia
- State: New South Wales
- City: Central Coast
- LGA: Central Coast Council
- Location: 53 km (33 mi) N of Sydney; 28 km (17 mi) SW of Gosford

Government
  - State electorate: Gosford
  - Federal division: Robertson
- Elevation: 6 m (20 ft)

Population
  - Total: 87 (2016 census)
- Postcode: 2083
- Parish: Cowan
Suburbs around Cheero Point
| | Mooney Mooney Creek |
| Bar Point | Cheero Point | Wondabyne |
| | Mooney Mooney |

Cheero Point is a waterfront locality and suburb of the Central Coast region of New South Wales, Australia. Cheero Point is located on the west bank of the Mooney Mooney Creek in the Brisbane Water National Park. It is situated 53 kilometres (33 mi) north of Sydney. It is part of the Central Coast Council local government area.

== History ==
The area was created by a land subdivision in 1918. In 1977, the Geographical Names Board included the small locality within the suburb of Mooney Mooney. However, community pressure from residents and the Mooney-Cheero Progress Association Inc. led to Gosford City Council recommending the separate gazettal of Cheero Point in its meeting on 5 November 2002, and the suburb name was officially reassigned on 21 March 2003.

The suburb made headlines when landslides near Jolls Bridge forced the closure of a 250-metre section of the Pacific Highway for several years. By March 1990, only one lane remained open, and in April 1991 the highway was closed to traffic following investigations by the Roads and Traffic Authority. As the road was the only alternative route to the Pacific Motorway between Gosford and Sydney, which itself was prone to congestion, local service station owner Jim Lloyd collected 60,000 signatures demanding the re-opening of the road. The cost of restoring the highway was estimated at A$2.3 million in May 1993. The road was eventually re-opened in June 1994, and in the 1996 federal elections, Jim Lloyd was elected to represent the Division of Robertson within which Cheero Point is located.

== Geography ==
Cheero Point is bounded by the Pacific Motorway to the west, Mooney Mooney Creek to the east, and the southern boundary of the Brisbane Water National Park to the north. It is traversed by the Pacific Highway.

== Transport ==
There are approximately 65 buses each week departing from the corner of Cheero Point Road and Cararma Parkway.
