= Bar Point =

- Suburb
- Interactive map of Bar Point
- Coordinates: 33°29′35″S 151°10′05″E
- Country: Australia
- State: New South Wales
- City: Central Coast
- LGA: Central Coast Council
- Location: 53 km (33 mi) N of Sydney; 23 km (14 mi) W of Gosford

Government
  - State electorate: Gosford
  - Federal division: Robertson
- Elevation: 19 m (62 ft)

Population
  - Total: 64 (2016 census)
- Postcode: 2083
- Parish: Cowan
Suburbs around Bar Point
Marlow	Mount White	Mooney Mooney Creek
Fishermans Point	Bar Point	Mooney Mooney Creek
Fishermans Point	Cowan	Cheero Point; Mooney Mooney

Bar Point is a suburb of the Central Coast region of New South Wales, Australia, located on the north bank of the Hawkesbury River 53 kilometres (33 mi) north of Sydney. It is part of the Central Coast Council local government area.

== Geography ==
Bar Point is bounded by the Hawkesbury River to the west and south, Marlows Gully to the north, and the M1 Pacific Motorway and Pacific Highway to the east, beyond which is the Brisbane Water National Park. The locality is home to the southern section of the Popran National Park, accessible via four-wheel drive from Mount White to the north. Below the national park along the Hawkesbury River coastline are a number of properties accessible only by boat or by water taxi from Brooklyn 10 kilometres (6 mi) downstream, as well as Bar Point Estate on the point itself.

Since 2003, the suburb has been home to a Rural Fire Station.

== Demographics ==
At the ABS 2016 census, Bar Point had a population of 64 people. The median age was 52, well above the national average of 38, and the median household income was $833 per week.

== Heritage listings ==
Bar Point has a number of heritage-listed sites, including:

- Cascade Gully, Hawkesbury River: HMAS Parramatta Shipwreck and Memorials
