= Marlow, New South Wales =

Coordinates: 33°28′05″S 151°09′58″E

Marlow
- Suburb
- Country: Australia
- State: New South Wales
- City: Central Coast
- LGA: Central Coast Council
- Location: 58 km (36 mi) N of Sydney; 24 km (15 mi) W of Gosford

Government
  - State electorate: Gosford
  - Federal division: Robertson
- Elevation: 5 m (16 ft)

Population
  - Total: 35 (SAL 2021)
- Postcode: 2775
- Parish: Cowan
Suburbs around Marlow
Wendoree Park	Mount White
Spencer	Marlow	Mount White
	Bar Point

Marlow is a suburb of the Central Coast region of New South Wales, Australia on the north bank of the Hawkesbury River 58 kilometres (36 mi) north of Sydney. It is part of the Central Coast Council local government area.

Although the northern boundary and Greenman Valley Recreation Park are reachable via a dirt track from the Sydney-Newcastle Freeway at Mount White, most of the suburb is only reachable by boat, and a ferry transports mail and groceries to the residents.
