= Mount White, New South Wales =

Coordinates: 33°27′24″S 151°11′34″E

Mount White
- Suburb
- Coordinates
- Country: Australia
- State: New South Wales
- City: Central Coast
- LGA: Central Coast Council
- Location: 58 km (36 mi) N of Sydney; 21 km (13 mi) W of Gosford

Government
  - State electorate: Gosford
  - Federal division: Robertson
- Elevation: 186 m (610 ft)

Population
  - Total: 171 (SAL 2021)
- Postcode: 2250
- Parish: Cowan
Suburbs around Mount White
Spencer	Glenworth Valley	Calga
Wendoree Park	Mount White	Mooney Mooney Creek
Marlow	Bar Point	Mooney Mooney Creek

Mount White is a rural locality on the Central Coast of New South Wales, Australia. Mount White is located 58 kilometres (36 mi) north of Sydney and 21 kilometres (13 mi) south-west of Gosford. The locality is adjacent to the Pacific Motorway. It is part of the Central Coast Council local government area.

A National Heavy Vehicle Regulator heavy vehicle inspection station is located at Mount White.
