= Mooney Mooney =

Coordinates: 33°31′23″S 151°12′04″E

- Suburb
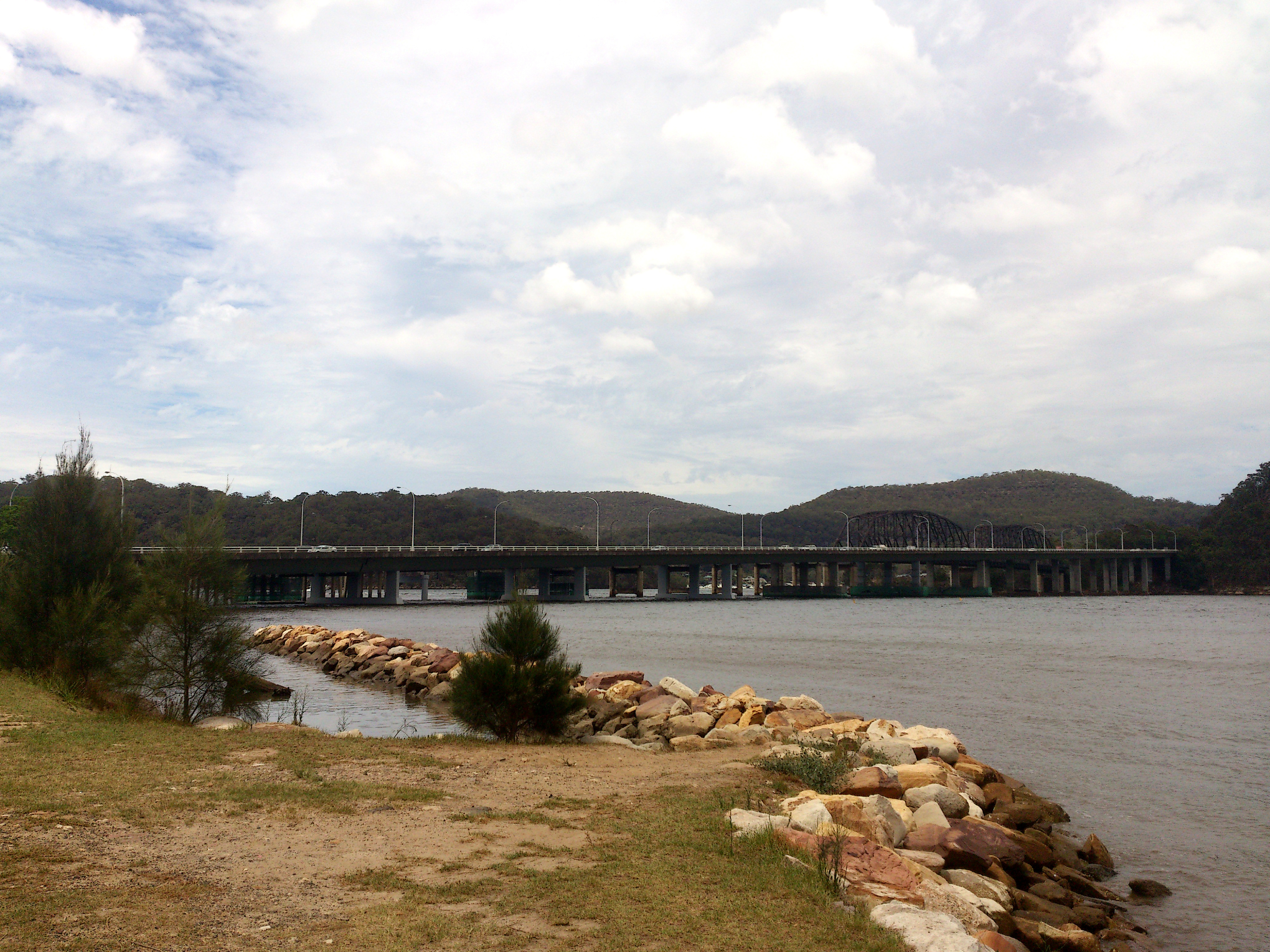
- Mooney Mooney with Deerubbun Reserve in the background
- Interactive map of Mooney Mooney
- Country: Australia
- State: New South Wales
- City: Central Coast
- LGA: Central Coast Council
- Location: 50 km (31 mi) N of Sydney; 29 km (18 mi) SW of Gosford

Government
  - State electorate: Gosford
  - Federal division: Robertson
- Elevation: 16 m (52 ft)

Population
  - Total: 350 (SAL 2021)
- Postcode: 2083
- Parish: Cowan
Suburbs around Mooney Mooney
| Bar Point | Cheero Point | Brisbane Water National Park |
| Hawkesbury River | Mooney Mooney | Cogra Bay |
| Cowan | Brooklyn | Brooklyn |

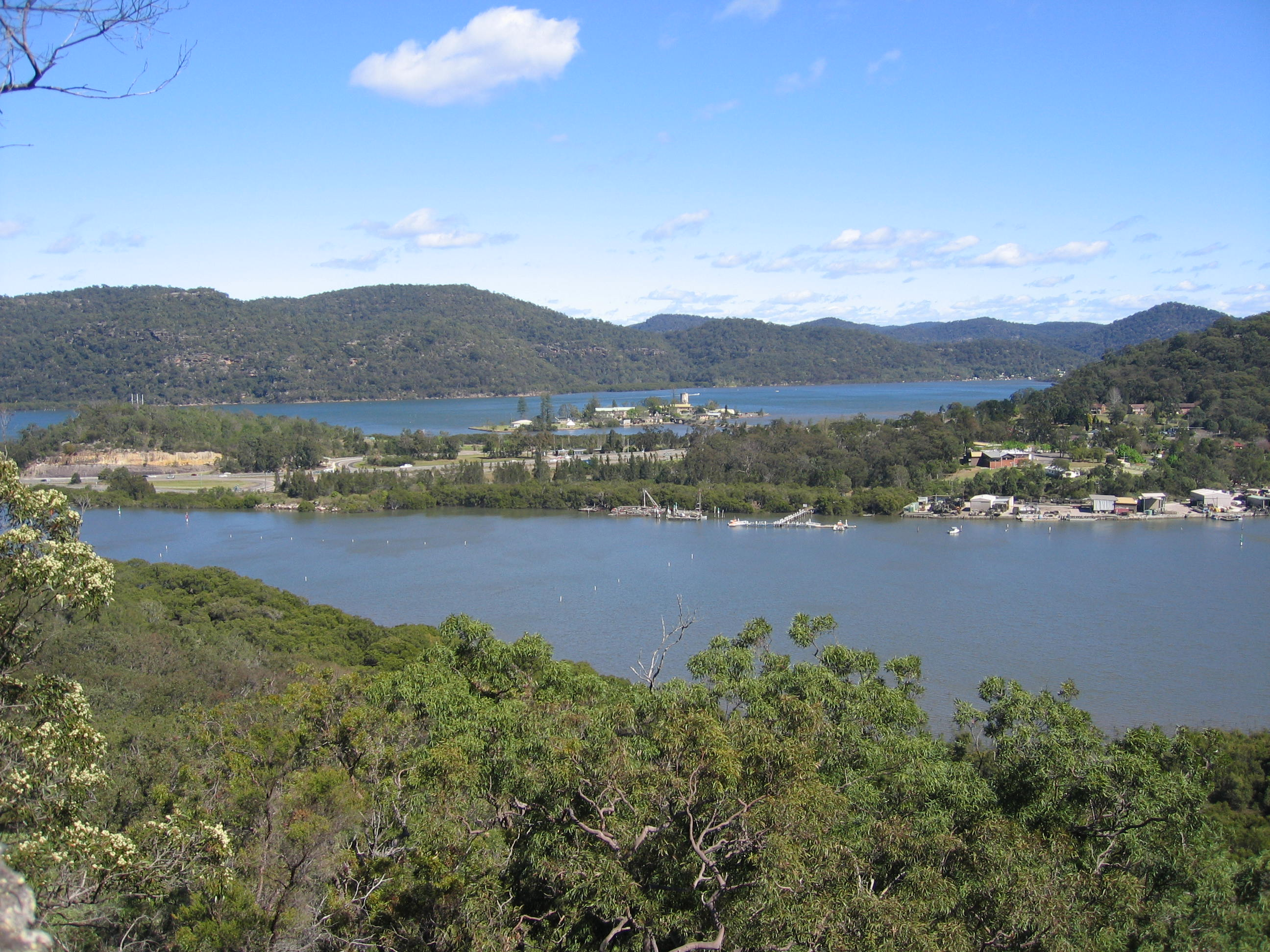
The village of Mooney Mooney and Peat Island, as viewed from the top of Spectacle Island

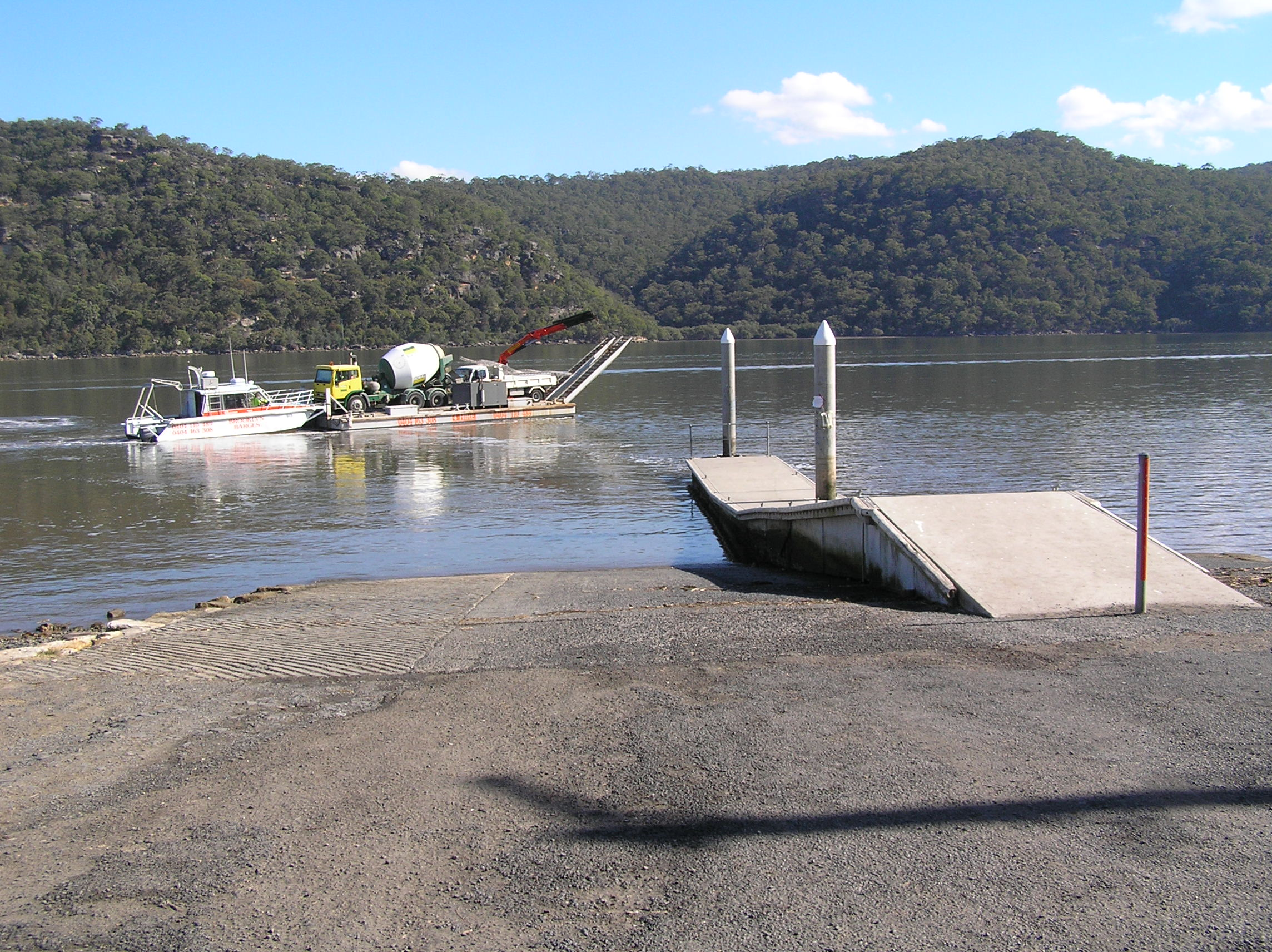
Mooney Mooney Boat ramp and jetty at Deerubbun Reserve

Mooney Mooney is a small waterfront village and suburb of the Central Coast region of New South Wales, Australia. It is located in the Central Coast Council local government area at the end of a peninsula extending southwards into the Hawkesbury River, that is situated 50 kilometres (31 mi) north of Sydney. Mooney Mooney has two islands which are Peat Island and Spectacle Island.

Mooney Mooney is where the Pacific Motorway and Pacific Highway cross from the Central Coast into the Greater Sydney Metropolitan area on the south side of the Hawkesbury River.

== Transport ==
CDC NSW operates one bus route through Mooney Mooney:

592: Hornsby to Brooklyn via Asquith, Mount Colah, Mount Kuring-gai and Berowra.

== History ==
Mooney Mooney is significant 'for its association with the early settlement of coastal NSW', according to a plaque at Deerubbun Reserve. In 1844, an early-colonial settler, George Peat, commenced a ferry service across the Hawkesbury River, from Mooney Mooney Point to Kangaroo Point on the southern bank. By 1930 this service was replaced by two diesel-powered vehicular ferries which became obsolete on completion of the Peats Ferry Road Bridge in 1945. Remnant timber piles of the former ferry docks, preserved in situ for posterity, can be seen on the foreshore of Mooney Mooney Point.

== The locality ==
Mooney Mooney is part of the Central Coast Council local government area. It includes Peat Island and Spectacle Island. It formerly included Cheero Point to the north, which was separately gazetted on 21 March 2003.

Its topography is characterised by a rocky foreshore onto the Hawkesbury River and a hilly landscape with slopes ranging from moderate to very steep. Land use is dominated by the north–south transport corridors, comprising the M1 Pacific Motorway and the Pacific Highway, and two adjoining residential areas east of the highway. Oyster farms and related depuration depots are in the suburb's south. The locality is serviced by sealed roads, electricity, telephone, and a reticulated water supply.

The 1.93-hectare (4.77-acre) Deerubbun Reserve adjoining the motorway at the suburb's southwest has been developed for public access to the Hawkesbury River. The reserve's public facilities include wharf, boat ramps, car and trailer parking area, fish-cleaning table, advisory signs (boating, fishing, personal water craft and navigation), picnic tables and amenities.

Linked by a causeway, the former Peat Island hospital, to the west, is now operated by the Department of Community Services. The 36.4-hectare (89.9-acre) |Spectacle Island, to the east, is an offshore nature reserve managed by the National Parks and Wildlife Service.

== See also ==
- List of reduplicated Australian place names
