= Peat Island =

Island in New South Wales, Australia

Coordinates: 33°31′46″S 151°11′39″E

Peat Island is an island in the village of Mooney Mooney located in the Hawkesbury River on the Central Coast of New South Wales, Australia. The Island has approximately eight hectares of land and is located just upstream from the Pacific Motorway and Pacific Highway bridge. It is considered an island due to its size. There is one road connecting the landmass to the mainland.

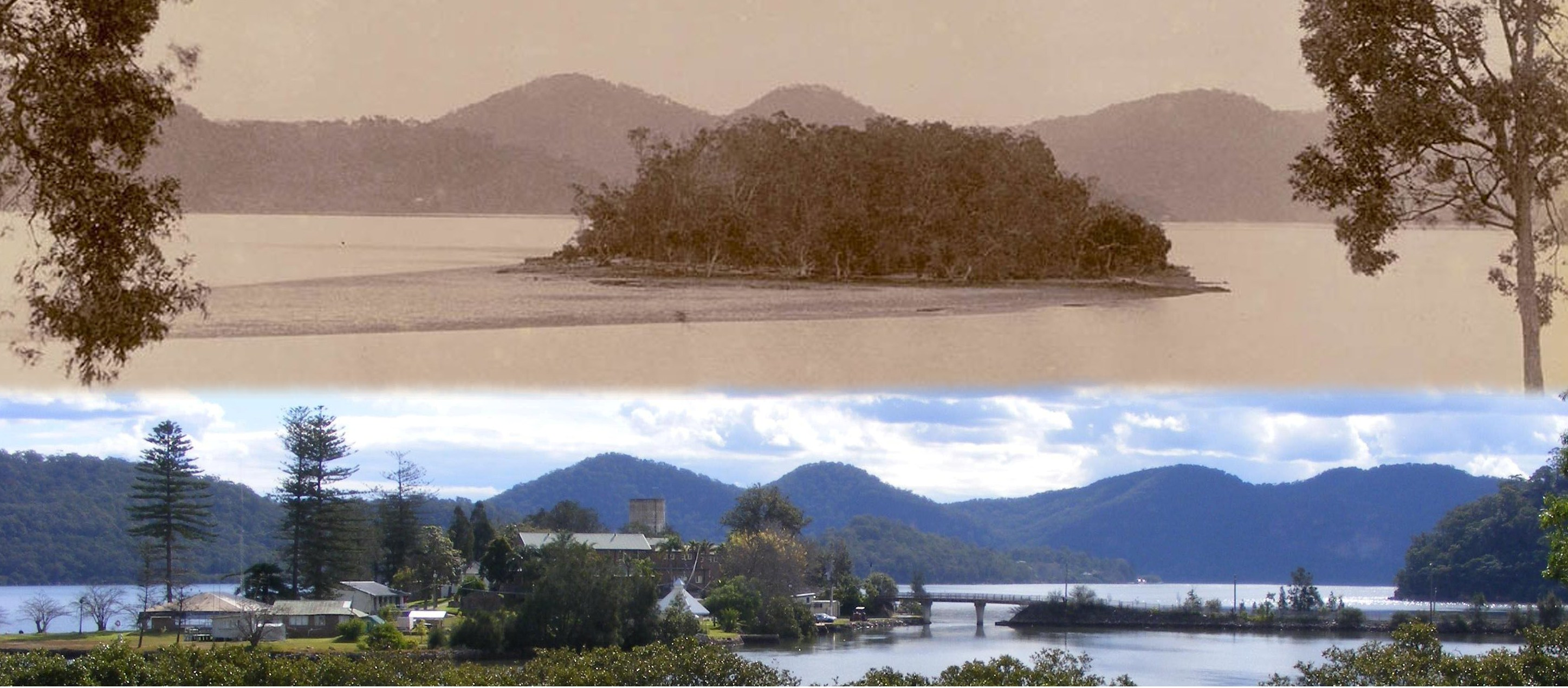
Peat Island

== History ==
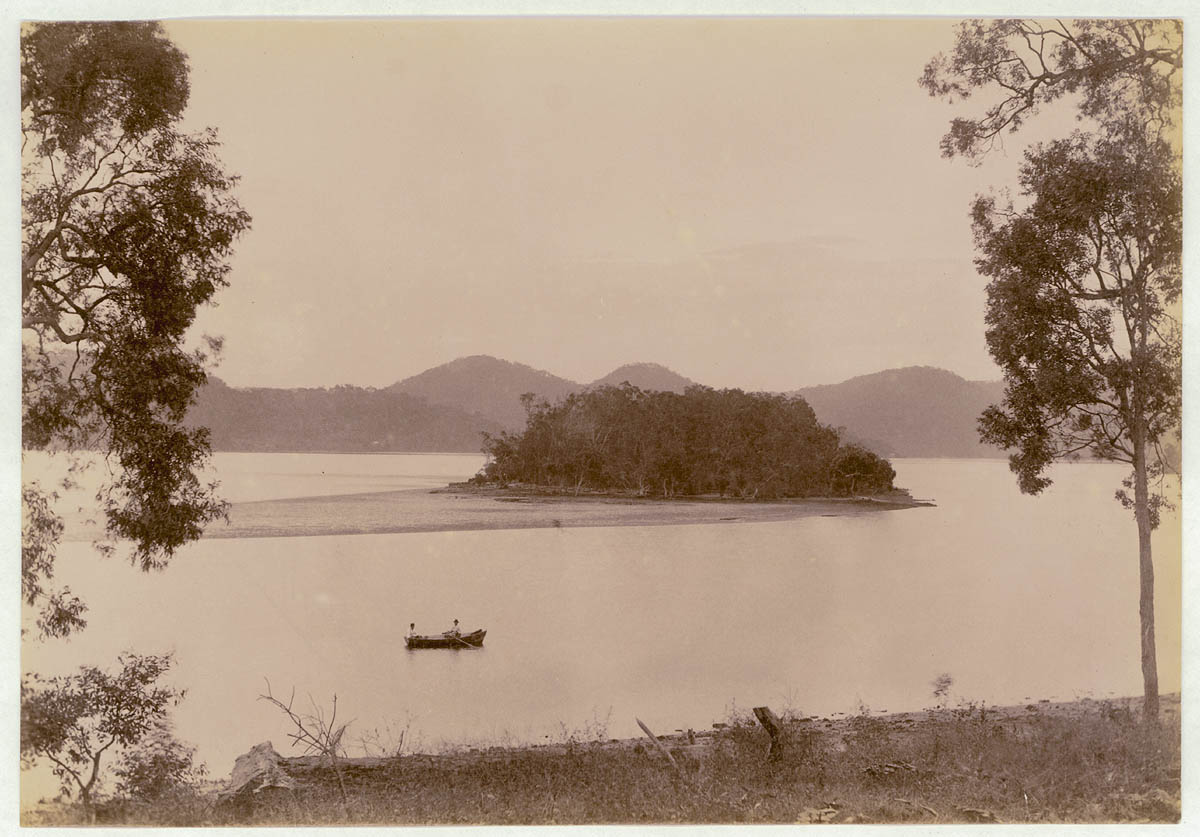
Peat Island c. 1900 before the hospital was built. Photo courtesy State Library of NSW

Peat Island was originally known as Rabbit Island, likely because rabbits were kept there as reported in 1841: "That to the east is termed Goat Island, having many of those animals grazing thereon, the other Rabbit Island, which is numerously stocked as a Rabbit Warren." It was renamed to Peat Island in 1936 due to its proximity to Peat's Ferry, which at the time was operating between Mooney Mooney and Kangaroo Point on the Hawkesbury River. George Peat was an early settler and boat builder who established the first ferry across the Hawkesbury in the area in 1844.

== Development of the Island ==
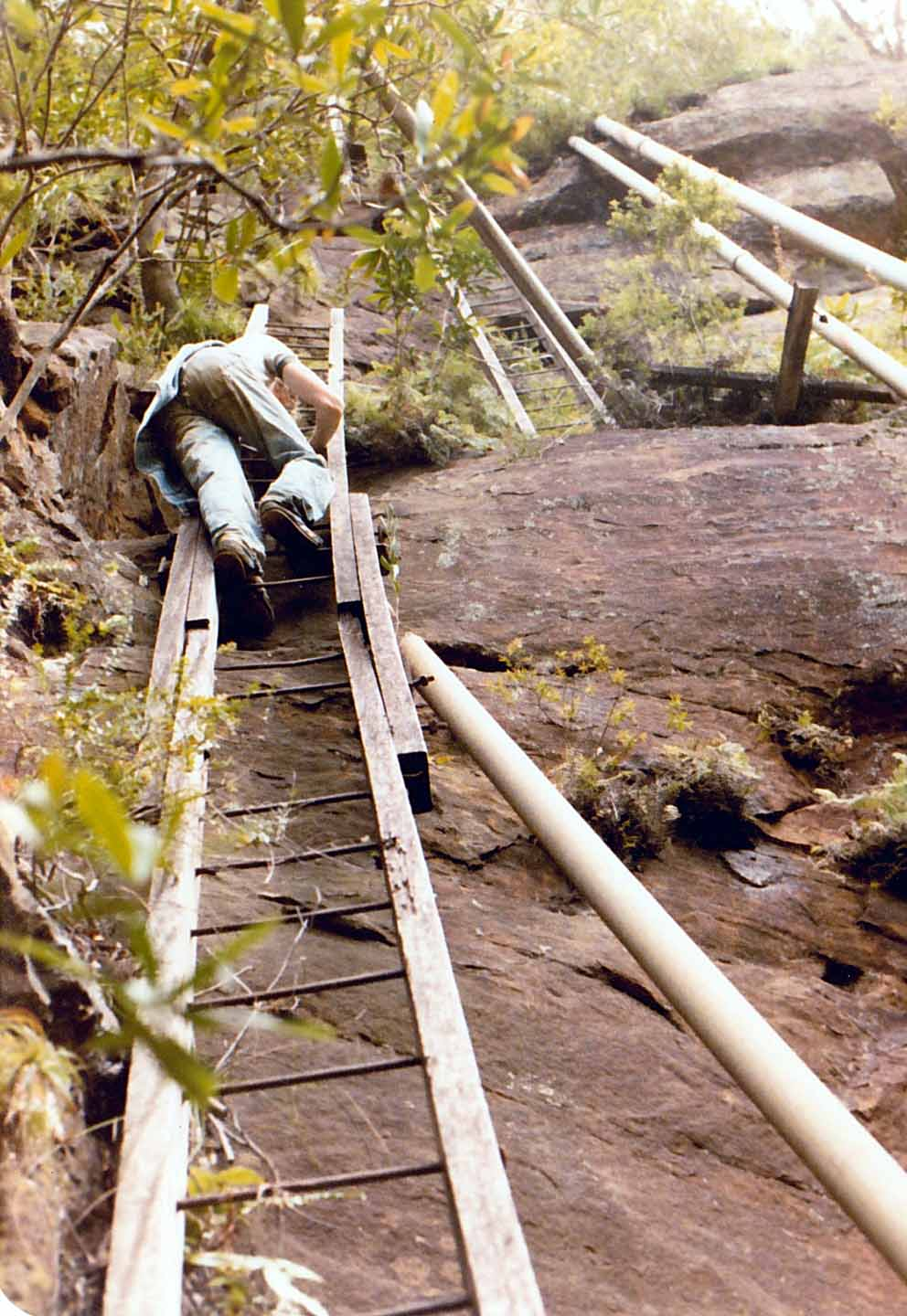
This series of five ladders provided access to the dam in the gully above the cliffs. Photographed in 1983.

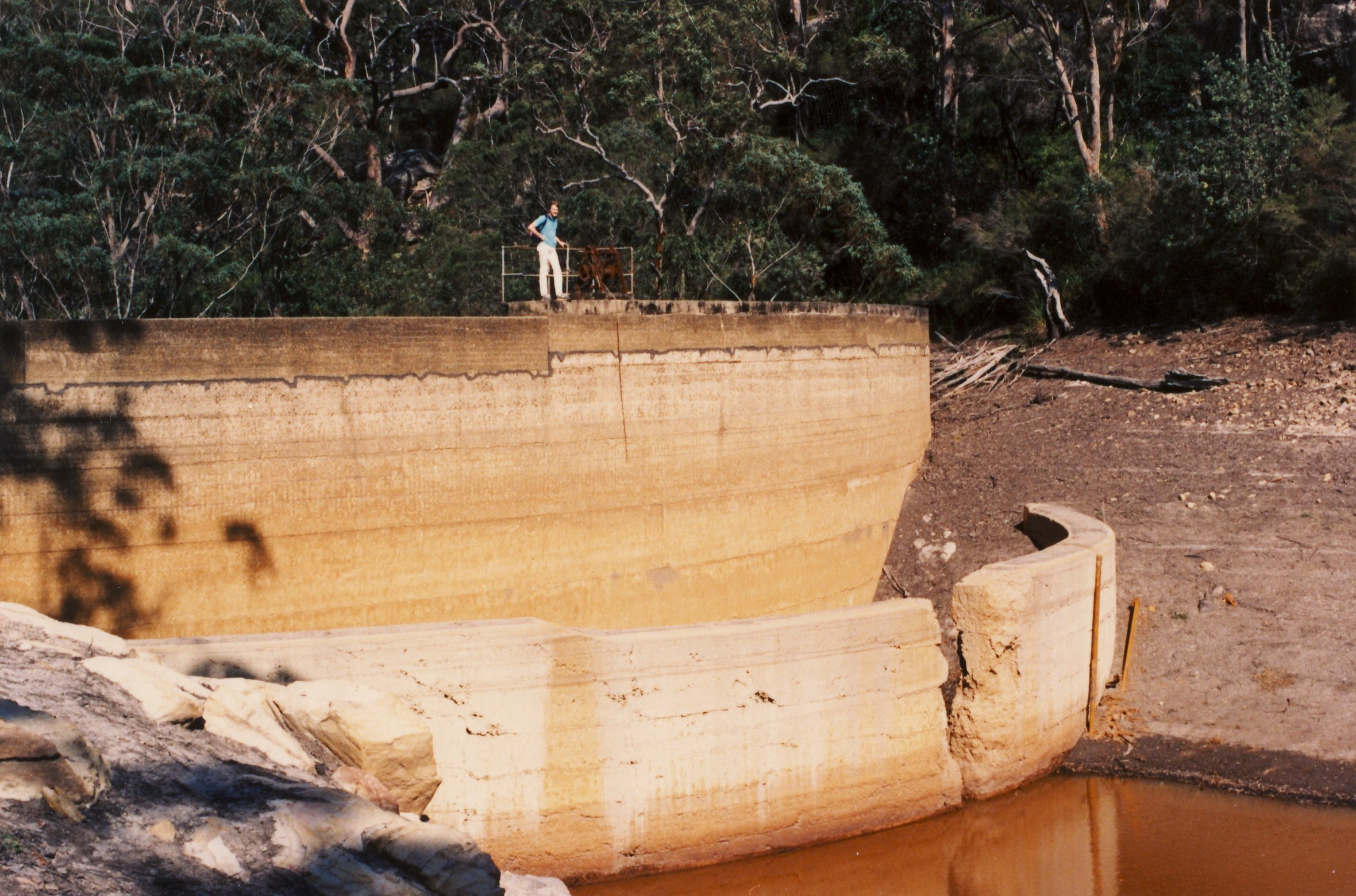
The two walls of the Cascade Creek dam supplied water for Peat and Milson Island. Photographed in 1991.

During the 1890s, the N.S.W. government decided to establish an asylum for alcoholics (inebriates) where they could be treated in isolation from the general prison and hospital population. The relevant legislation was passed in 1900, and Dr. J. M. Creed, a member of the N.S.W. Legislative Council from 1885 to 1930, selected Peat, and nearby Milson Island, as the site for the female and male asylums, respectively.

Construction began in 1902, with Peat Island being cleared and levelled. Several buildings were erected, including a hexagonal sewing room and two storey brick edifices that still dominate the island. In order to provide fresh water to both Peat and Milson Islands, a 24 feet (7.3 m) high concrete dam holding 7,000,000 gallons was constructed across a gully on the northern bank of the Hawkesbury River, a few kilometres upstream and above the cliffs overlooking the wreck of HMAS Parramatta. Rock and sand for the dam were obtained on site, but cement and other materials had to be hauled 275 feet (84 m) up the cliff face from the river using old Sydney tram cables. The only access to the reservoir was via a series of five, near vertical timber and iron ladders that were pinned into the face of the cliff adjacent to the waterfall. A pipeline ran from the reservoir and serviced both islands via underwater mains.

Some years later, a higher dam was erected a few metres downstream in order to increase capacity, but the original dam wall remains beneath the water, and is sometimes visible during droughts. The vertical ladders in the cliff face were barely trafficable, with missing rungs and rusted anchorages, until their destruction in the January 1994 bushfires. This water supply system was decommissioned when both islands were linked to Sydney mains water.

The expense of establishing the facility in such an isolated location prompted much public criticism, and upon completion in 1905, the Windsor and Richmond Gazette reported that: "The Asylum for Inebriates at Rabbit Island, Hawkesbury River, has been completed, at a cost of £6500. A few of our dipsomaniacs in Parliament should be sent thither."

The new facility sat idle for a few years, managed by a caretaker, and hosting various government officials and associates on picnics or social occasions. In January 1905, it was the site of a day trip for an irrigator's conference. The convivial atmosphere was described in the press report which stated: "... and after a cruise below the famous bridge, the vessel was steered to a small island some three miles above, known as Rabbit Island, where luncheon had been prepared. To back-country men, the title was certainly suggestive, and proved the subject of joking, but the levity became pronounced when inquiry elicited the information that the buildings nearing completion on the island were for an inebriate's home. Sir William Lyne at luncheon caused much laughter by expressing his surprise at the Minister for Works bringing them to such a place to give it baptism, but not with water".

However, by 1907 the government had lost interest in the project, deciding instead to set aside space in Darlinghurst gaol for the treatment of inebriates, and in 1908 the facility was handed over to the Lunacy Department for use as a hospital for the insane.

== Peat Island Hospital ==
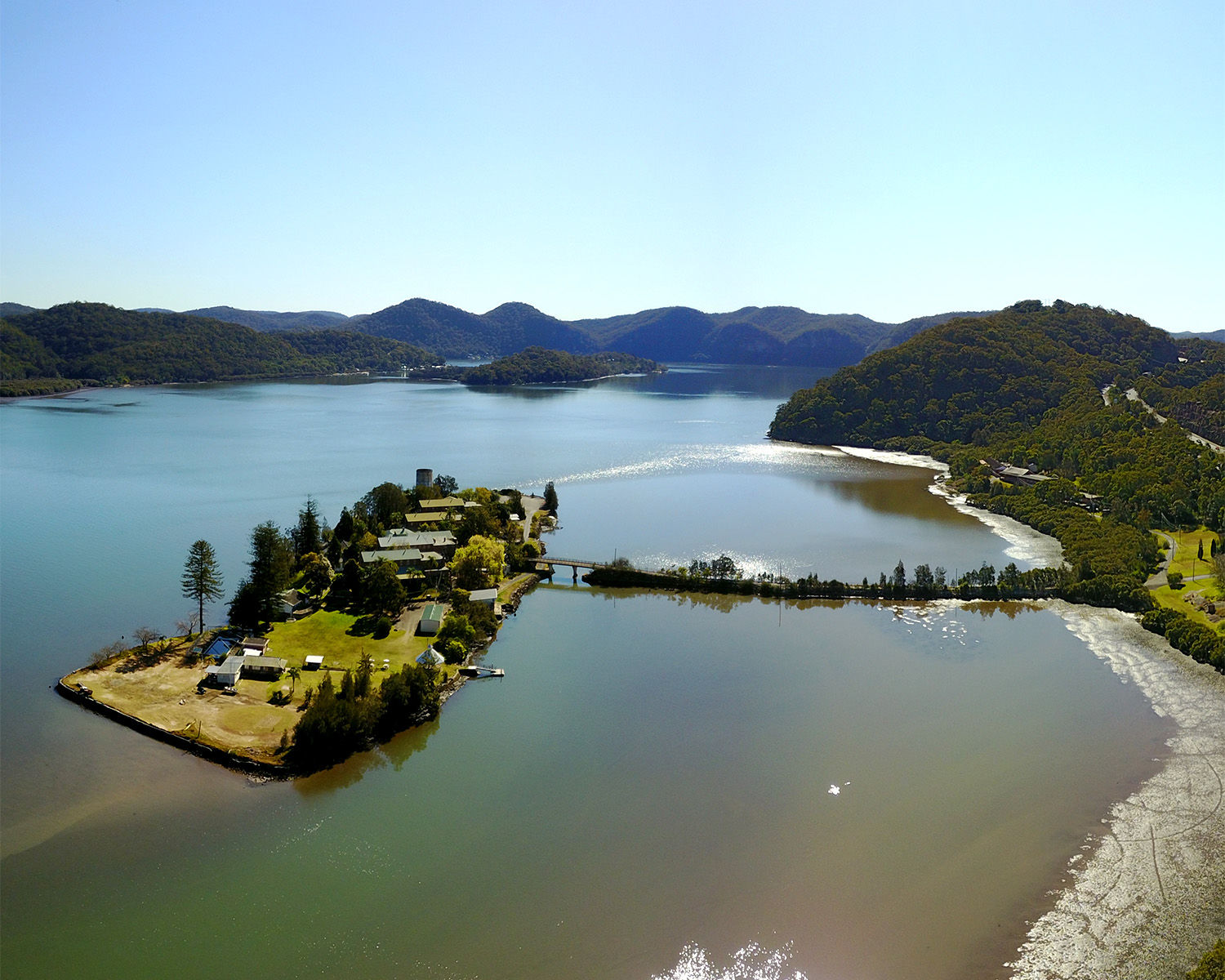
Peat Island and causeway. Aerial panorama.

The first twenty patients were admitted to the newly instated hospital in March 1911. Initially it was a male only institution. The number of patients grew and the facility was further developed, paths and gardens were constructed with manual labour, and new buildings were added. Patients and staff spent ten years building the rubble causeway and bridge to the mainland, which was completed in 1957. Over the decades, the hospital outgrew the island and expanded onto the adjacent mainland, where a chapel and other facilities were constructed, mainly in the 1950s and 1960s.

Despite the scenic location, the facility was a grim place to live, especially in the earlier years. Press reports document drownings and unexplained deaths of young men and boys, with at least 300 patients died during their time there who were interred in unmarked paupers' graves at the nearby Brooklyn cemetery.

As social attitudes to mental illness and people with developmental disabilities changed over time, the facilities and amenities improved. A school was opened in 1951 when it was realised that the boys would benefit from schooling. Many of the patients were boys who were left in the care of the state, as their parents lacked the ability or inclination to deal with their condition. Accounts from staff who worked there describe children with no parents or family, milling quietly around those children whose families had come to celebrate Christmas and other occasions, in the hopes of experiencing this closeness.

Many patients lived out their entire lives on the island, having been admitted as children. Some patients were allowed freedom of movement into the adjacent neighbourhood.

The hospital also operated a "canteen" on the Pacific Highway at Mooney Mooney, where fuel and takeaway food was available until 2010.

== Closure ==
In 1983, the Richmond report on Mental Health Services in N.S.W. recommended that institutions such as Peat Island should be closed and the patients integrated into the general community where possible. Various plans were announced for the facility over the following 27 years until it was decommissioned in October 2010 and the remaining residents were moved to new facilities on the Central Coast at Hamlyn Terrace and Wadalba.

In late 2010, local press reported rumours that the island was being considered as a detention centre for asylum seekers, a claim denied by the state and federal governments, and currently the facility is boarded up and empty, awaiting a decision about its future from the N.S.W. State Property Authority.
