= Hawkesbury River =

River in New South Wales, Australia

Hawkesbury-Nepean River
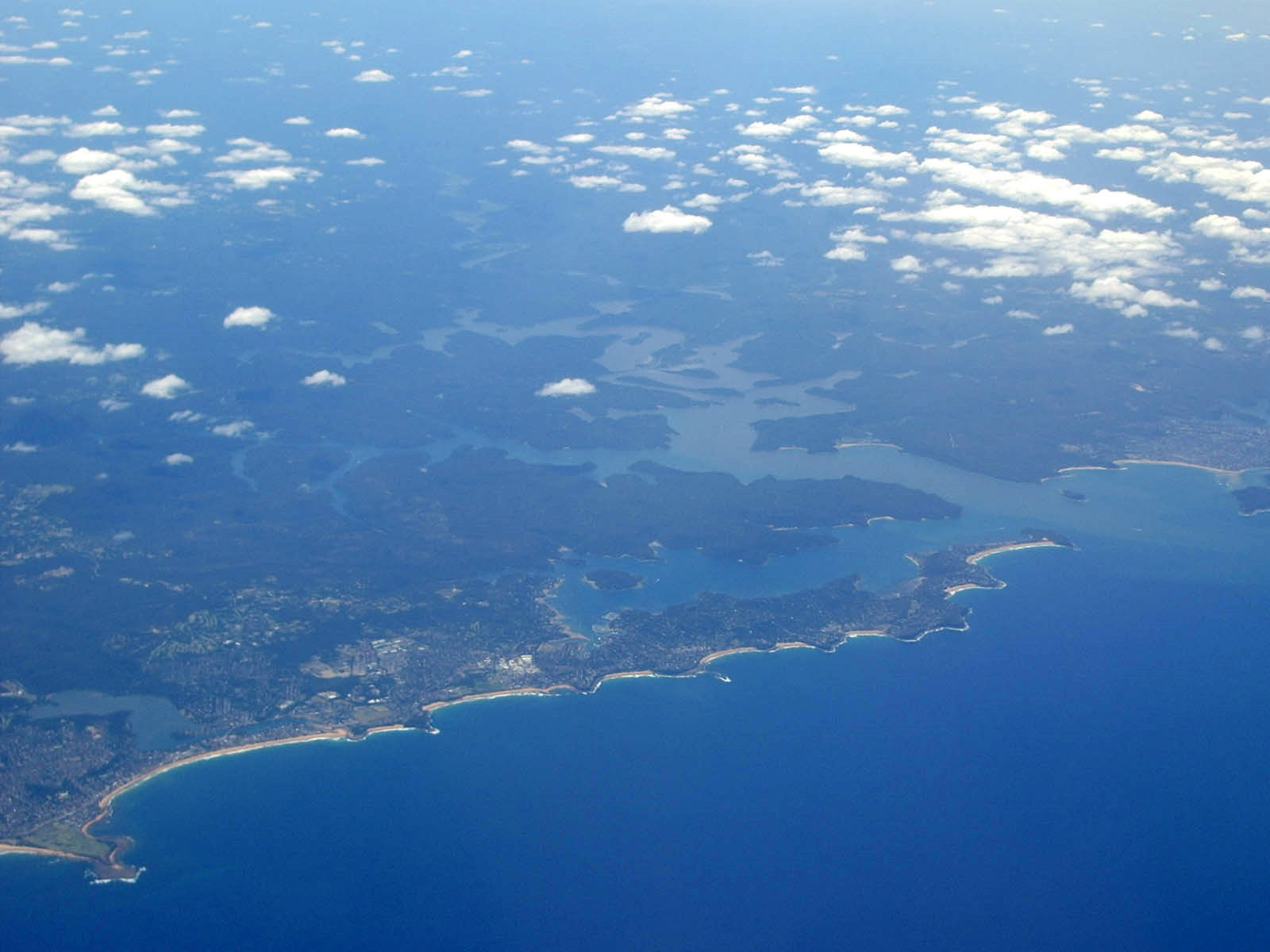
- Aerial photograph showing the mouth of the Hawkesbury River as it flows into Broken Bay and out into the Tasman Sea, as seen looking across Sydney's Northern Beaches
- Native name: Dyarubbin (Dharuk)

Location
- Country: Australia
- State: New South Wales
- Region: Greater Sydney; Central Coast

Physical characteristics
- Source: Nepean River
  - location: north of Penrith
- 2nd source: Grose River
- Mouth: Broken Bay
  - location: west of Lion Island
  - coordinates: 33°33′53.9994″S 151°18′0″E
- Length: 120 km (75 mi)
- Basin size: 21,624.1 km^{2} (8,349.1 sq mi)
- Discharge
  - location: Near mouth
  - average: 150.2 m^{3}/s (4,740 GL/a) 95 m^{3}/s (3,400 cu ft/s)
  - minimum: 0 m^{3}/s (0 cu ft/s)
  - maximum: 15,000 m^{3}/s (530,000 cu ft/s)

Basin features
- Tributaries
  - left: Colo River, Webbs Creek, Macdonald River, Mangrove Creek, Popran Creek, Mooney Mooney Creek
  - right: Cattai Creek, South Creek, Berowra Creek
- Islands: Milson Island, Peat Island, Spectacle Island, Long Island, and Dangar Island

The Hawkesbury River, or Hawkesbury-Nepean River (Dharug: Dyarubbin) is a river located northwest of Sydney, New South Wales, Australia. The Hawkesbury River and its associated main tributary, the Nepean River, almost encircle the metropolitan region of Sydney. The river between Wisemans Ferry and the Pacific Ocean marks the boundary of Greater Metropolitan Sydney in the south and the Central Coast region to the north. The Hawkesbury River has its origin at the confluence of the Nepean River and the Grose River, to the north of Penrith and travels for approximately 120 kilometres (75 mi) in a north–easterly and then a south–easterly direction to its mouth at Broken Bay, about 15 kilometres (9.3 mi) from the Tasman Sea.

The Hawkesbury River is the main tributary of Broken Bay. Secondary tributaries include Brisbane Water and Pittwater, which, together with the Hawkesbury River, flow into Broken Bay and thence into the Tasman Sea north of Barrenjoey Head. The total catchment area of the river is approximately 21,624 square kilometres (8,349 sq mi) and the area is generally administered by the Hawkesbury–Nepean Catchment Management Authority. The land adjacent to the Hawkesbury River was occupied by Aboriginal peoples: the Darkinjung, Darug, Eora, and Kuringgai. They used the river as a source of food and a place for trade. In the languages of the traditional custodians the river is Deerubben or Dyarubbin. In March 2021, the river level rose, and many areas were flooded as part of the March 2021 Australian floods.

== Course ==
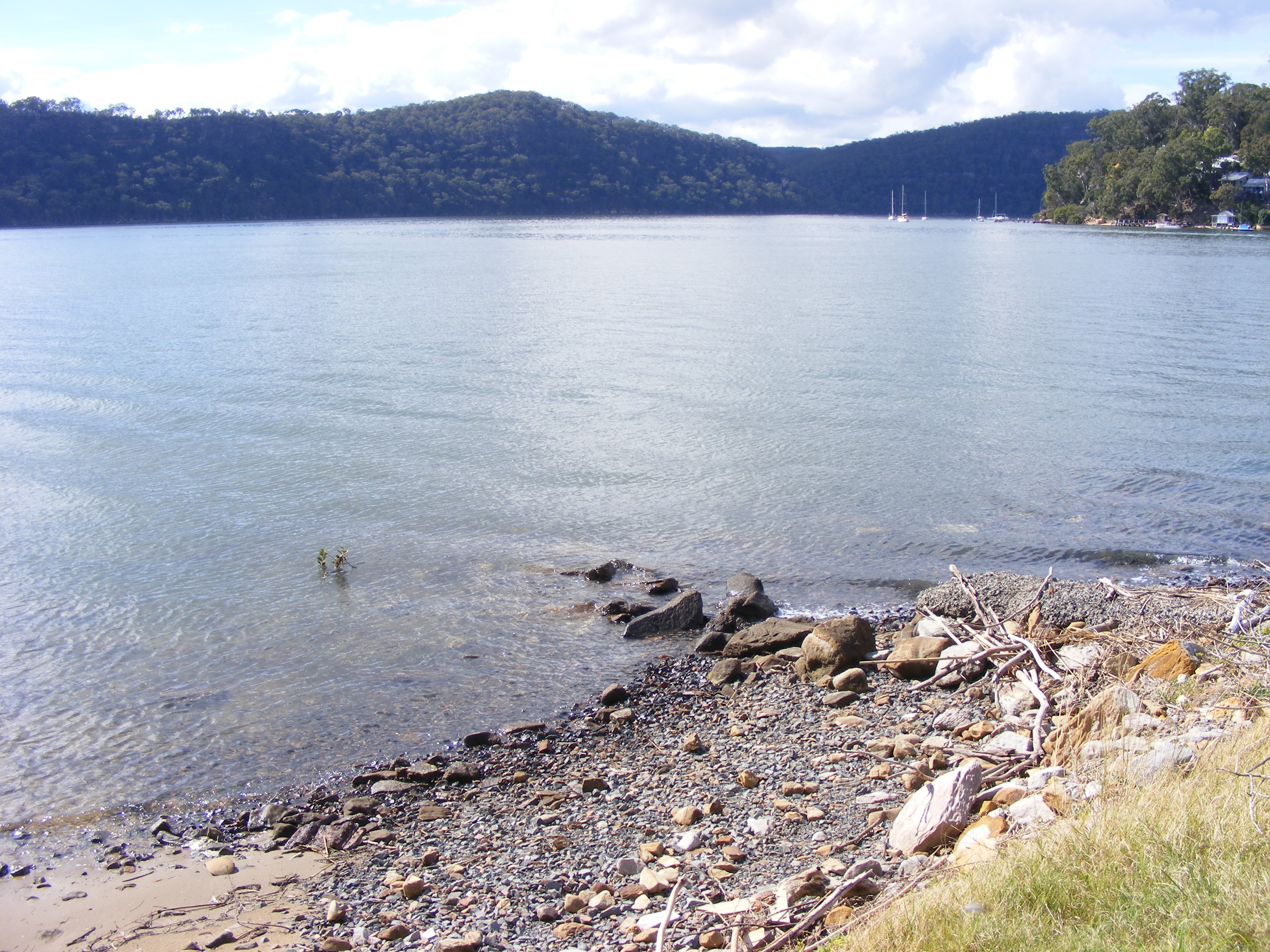
Looking north-east across the Hawkesbury River, with Dangar Island to the right of the image.

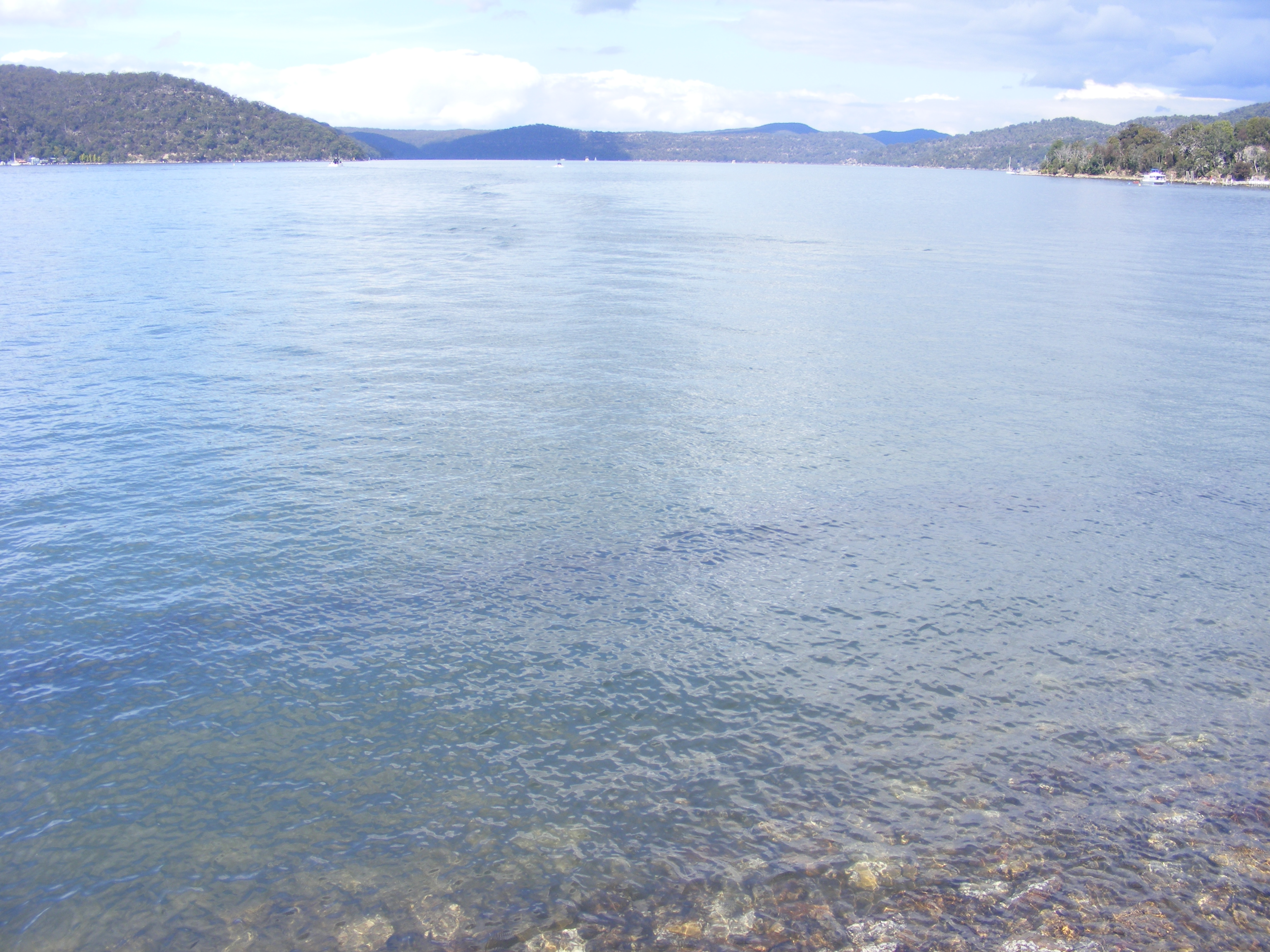
Looking south-east across the Hawkesbury River, from near Brooklyn.

The headwaters of the Hawkesbury River, the Avon River, the Cataract River, and the Cordeaux River, rise only a few kilometres (miles) from the sea, about 80 kilometres (50 mi) south of Sydney. These streams start on the inland-facing slopes of the plateau which forms the escarpment behind Wollongong. Flowing north-west, away from the sea, these streams combine to form the Nepean River, and flow north past the towns of Camden and Penrith. Near Penrith, the Warragamba River emerges from its canyon through the Blue Mountains and joins the Nepean. The Warragamba, formed by the joining of the Wollondilly River, the Nattai River, the Kowmung River and Coxs River drains a broad region of New South Wales on the eastern side of the Great Dividing Range. The other principal component of the upper Hawkesbury river system, the Grose River, rises in the area of Mount Victoria in the Blue Mountains.

Once formed, the Hawkesbury River proper flows generally northwards, albeit with a significant number of meanders. Initially the river passes the towns of Richmond and Windsor, which are the largest settlements on the river. At Windsor, the river is joined by South Creek, which drains much of the urban runoff in Sydney's western suburbs that does not fall into the Parramatta River catchment. As it flows north, it enters a more rural area, with only small settlements on the river. On this stretch it passes Sackville and Lower Portland, where it is joined by the Colo River. The Colo River and its tributaries drain the northern section of the Blue Mountains.

From Lower Portland, the Hawkesbury River continues flowing northwards to the small community of Wisemans Ferry where it is joined by the Macdonald River. Here its course turns eastwards and the surrounding landscape gradually becomes steeper and more rugged. At Spencer, Mangrove Creek joins the river from the north. From here to the river mouth, road access to the river is limited to a few points.

At Milsons Passage, the river is joined by Berowra Creek from the south. In the area around Brooklyn the river is crossed by the major road (M1 Pacific Motorway) and rail services (Central Coast & Newcastle Line) that follow the coast north from Sydney. The river finally reaches the ocean at Broken Bay.

From the confluence of the Nepean and Grose Rivers to the sea, the Hawkesbury River has a total length of some 120 kilometres (75 mi).

== Islands ==
Islands in the Hawkesbury River include, in order going downstream are Bar Island, Milson Island, Snake Island, Peat Island, Spectacle Island, Long Island, Dangar Island and Lion Island.

== Crossings ==
Despite forming the effective boundary of the metropolitan region of Sydney for its entire length, there are very few fixed crossings of the Hawkesbury River proper. Going downstream, these comprise:

Crossing name (Unofficial name)	North bank crossing location	South bank crossing location	Comments/use	Image
Richmond Bridge	North Richmond	Richmond	A bridge that carries the historic Bells Line of Road and formerly carried the Kurrajong railway line	
Windsor Bridge	Freemans Reach	Windsor	A bridge that carries the Windsor Road.	
Sackville Ferry		Sackville	A vehicular cable ferry.	
Lower Portland Ferry		Lower Portland	A vehicular cable ferry.	
Webbs Creek Ferry		Wisemans Ferry	A vehicular cable ferry just upstream of the settlement of Wisemans Creek.	
Wisemans Ferry		Wisemans Ferry	A vehicular cable ferry at the settlement of Wisemans Creek that carries the old Great North Road.	
Brooklyn Bridge	Mooney Mooney	Kangaroo Point	Carries the M1 Pacific Motorway parallel to Peats Ferry Bridge.	
Peats Ferry Bridge	Mooney Mooney	Kangaroo Point	An older bridge that carries the Pacific Highway.	
Hawkesbury River Railway Bridge	Cogra Point	Brooklyn	A bridge that carries the Main Northern railway line.	

In the lower reaches of the river there are also a few passenger ferries that cross the river. These include the Palm Beach Ferry service from Palm Beach to Ettalong and Wagstaffe, and the Hawkesbury River Ferries service from Brooklyn to Dangar Island and Little Wobby.

== History ==
=== Aboriginal Australian history ===
A list from 1829 made by Reverend John McGarvie includes the place names used by the Aboriginal people along the river, including the name of the river itself Dyarubbin. An alternative spelling of the Aboriginal name for the river was published as Deerubbun in 1870. The two main Aboriginal tribes inhabiting the area were the Wannungine of the coastal area on the lower reaches (below Mangrove Creek) and the Darkinyung people, whose lands were extensive on the lower Hawkesbury to Mangrove Creek, upper Hawkesbury, inland Hunter and lower Blue Mountains. Also known on the banks of the river were the Eora and Guringai people.

=== Australian history since colonisation ===
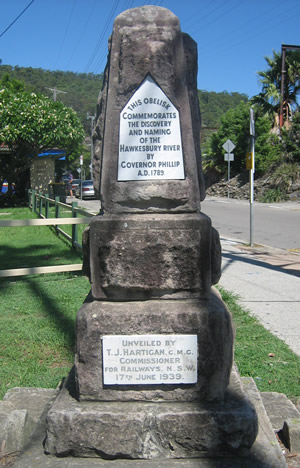
The Hawkesbury River was renamed by Governor Phillip in 1789

In 1789 two expeditions explored the Hawkesbury to the northwest of Sydney and the Nepean River to the southwest. It took about three years to realise they had discovered the same river system. Hawkesbury River was one of the pivotal positions of the Hawkesbury and Nepean Wars, a series of skirmishes and battles between the Kingdom of Great Britain and the resisting Indigenous clans that took place between late 1780s and late 1810s.

Following European settlement, the Hawkesbury became an important agricultural district because of the fertility of its alluvial floodplain. In 1798, colonial official David Collins described the river as "the Nile of New South Wales", noting that the fertility of its banks could provide the colony with a reliable supply of grain. The comparison with the Nile was also made by Barron Field in 1825, who called the Hawkesbury–Nepean the "Nile of Botany Bay" because the fertility of its riverbanks was replenished by floods descending from the Blue Mountains.

The Hawkesbury River was one of the major transportation routes for transporting food from the surrounding area to Sydney during the 1800s. Boats would wait in the protection of Broken Bay and Pittwater, until favourable weather allowed them to make the ocean journey to Sydney Heads. With the opening of the railway from Sydney to Windsor in 1864, farm produce could be shipped upriver for onward transportation by train. However, by the 1880s the river had become silted up between Sackville and Windsor, and Sackville became the head of navigation for sea-going vessels. Until the end of the 19th century coastal steamers linked Sackville to Sydney.

The Hawkesbury River was given its present name by Governor Phillip in June 1789, after Charles Jenkinson, 1st Earl of Liverpool, who at that time was titled Baron Hawkesbury, after the Cotswolds village of Hawkesbury Upton in England, where the Jenkinsons still live. An obelisk was unveiled in 1939 at Brooklyn to commemorate the naming. In 1794, 22 families were granted land at Bardenarang, now known as Pitt Town Bottoms, near Windsor. In that same year, confrontations between Aboriginal people and settlers broke out.

== Controversy ==
=== Raising of Warragamba Dam ===
In May 2017, the New South Wales state government released the Hawkesbury-Nepean Valley Flood Risk Management Strategy, that proposed raising the height of Warragamba Dam by an additional 17 metres, using the Climate Change Mitigation Fund. It was claimed that this would reduce the risk of flooding to homes downstream along the Hawkesbury-Nepean river, that is the most at-risk region of Australia to devastating flooding, exacerbated by Global Warming. A large public opposition campaign culminating in the GIVE A DAM movement began to protect the ecological, historical and Indigenous heritage of the additional area prone to flooding due to the raising of the dam wall. A significant portion of the land to be inundated is located within the Blue Mountains World Heritage Area designated by UNESCO, which stated that this status could be revoked if parts of the world heritage area were to be submerged. Activists also claim that the raising of the dam wall will give rise to additional developments downstream, which are currently not allowed to build on floodplains with a risk of a one-in-hundred-year flood. They also claim that any raising of the dam wall will be ineffective at flood mitigation, as the Warragamba River only contributes around 15% of water volume to the Hawkesbury-Nepean system. This issue has again been raised after the March 2021 Australian floods, with government ministers disagreeing on what needs to be done.

=== Windsor Bridge Replacement ===
Plans to replace the Windsor Bridge, and direct traffic through the historic Thompson Square caused significant community opposition culminating in the Community Action for Windsor Bridge (CAWB) movement. Despite this opposition, work on the replacement bridge was completed in May 2020.

=== Third Crossing ===
Plans for a third crossing at Navua Reserve in Yarramundi, and at North Richmond, 50 metres from the current Richmond Bridge Site are causing public opposition. Activists do not believe that these bridges will alleviate traffic, citing that a North Richmond and Richmond by-pass is required.

== River usage ==
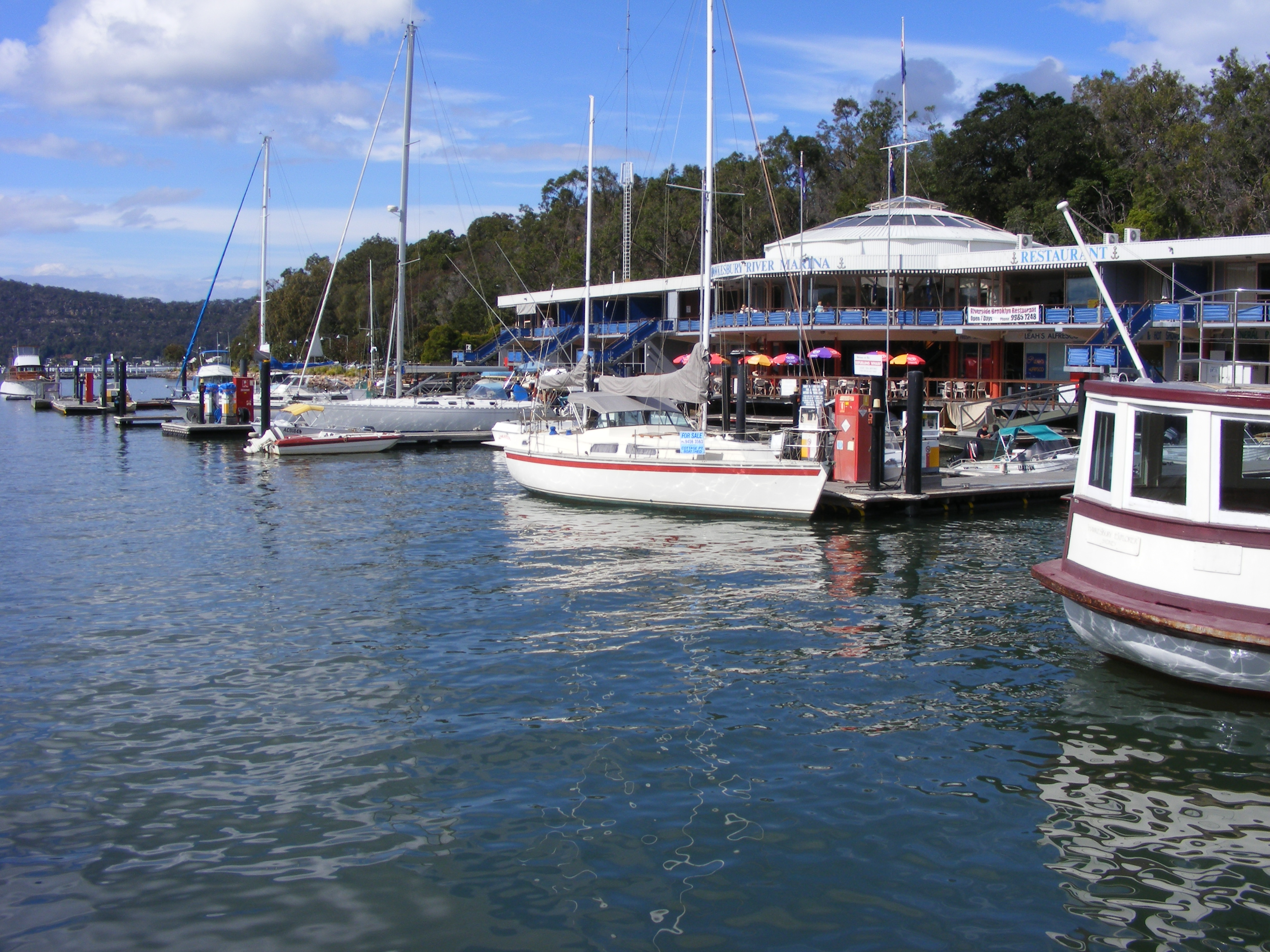
Hawkesbury River Marina

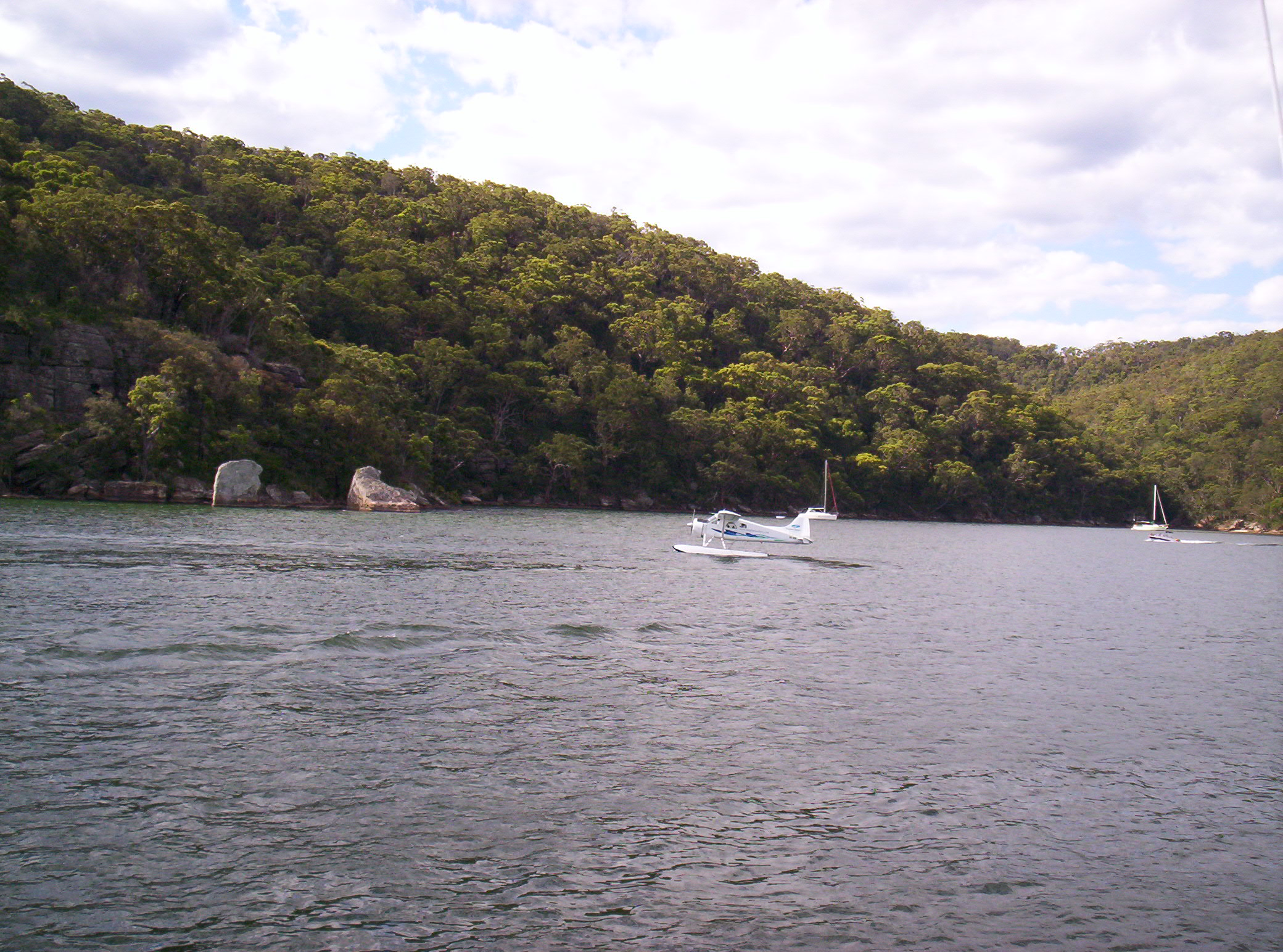
A seaplane on the Hawkesbury River

=== Navigation ===
The Hawkesbury River is navigable from Windsor to the sea. There are no dams or locks on the river, and the effects of the tide are felt as far west as Windsor.

Whilst use of the river to carry farm produce and other goods has now largely been superseded by road transport, the river remains the only form of access to a significant number of isolated homes and communities. This is especially true in the lower reaches of the river, where the steep and rugged terrain inhibits road construction. One consequence of this is the operation of Australia's last riverboat postman, a river service that delivers mail to properties on the river between Brooklyn and Spencer.

=== Sporting activities ===
The Hawkesbury Canoe Classic, a 111 km canoe race, is held annually in October or November. The race starts at Windsor and finishes at Brooklyn. The Bridge to Bridge is a water ski race that is run in the opposite direction, from Dangar Island to Windsor. Windsor and also Dargle ski park on the Hawkesbury river each year hold a Circuit Boat race meeting with boats travelling from all over country

=== Commercial fishing ===
According to the Hawkesbury Nepean Catchment Management Authority, the Hawkesbury River estuary supports the second-largest commercial coastal fishery of estuary prawns, oysters (prior to the outbreak of QX disease) and fish in New South Wales, with a wholesale value of $6.3 million annually.

== Cultural references ==
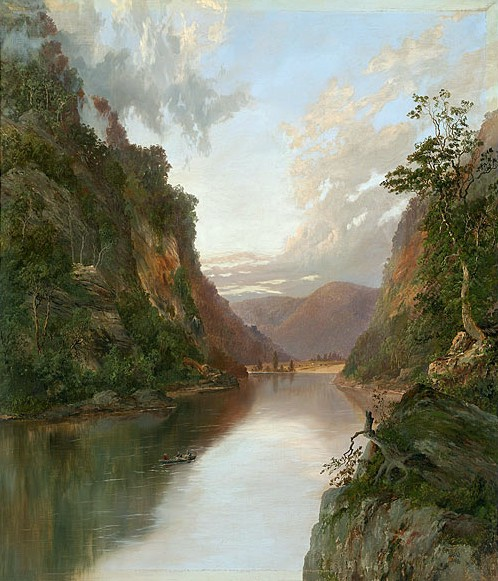
Hawkesbury River by William Piguenit (1881)

- Australian novelist Kate Grenville's historical fiction novel The Secret River is set on the Hawkesbury.
- The 2004 film Oyster Farmer is set mostly on the Hawkesbury.
- Artists William Piguenit and Arthur Streeton painted the Hawkesbury River in the late 19th century.
- Australian television shows like A Country Practice and Home and Away have used the Hawkesbury in exterior shots.
- Australian musician John Williamson sings about Hawkesbury River in his 1982 song "Hawkesbury River Lovin'".

== See also ==
- Rivers of New South Wales
- List of rivers of Australia
- Geography of Sydney
- Mangrove Creek (New South Wales)
- Popran Valley
