= Wyong Shire =

Former local government area in New South Wales, Australia

- Local government area
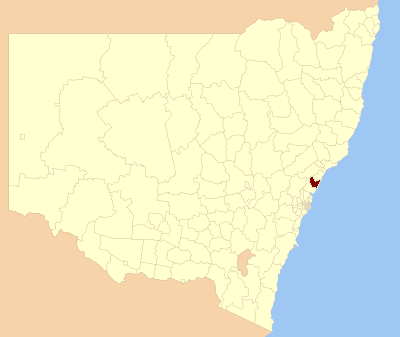
- Location in New South Wales

- Coordinates: 33°16′S 151°25′E
- Country: Australia
- State: New South Wales
- Region: Central Coast
- Location: 90 km (56 mi) N of Sydney; 74 km (46 mi) SSW of Newcastle
- Established: 1 January 1947
- Abolished: 12 May 2016
- Council seat: Wyong

Government
  - Mayor: Doug Eaton
  - State electorates: Wyong; The Entrance; Swansea
  - Federal divisions: Dobell; Shortland

Area
  - Total: 827 km^{2} (319 sq mi)

Population
  - Total: 149,746 (2011 census)
  - Density: 181.07/km^{2} (469.0/sq mi)
- Website: Wyong Shire
LGAs around Wyong Shire
Cessnock	Lake Macquarie	Tasman Sea
Gosford	Wyong Shire	Tasman Sea
Gosford	Gosford	Tasman Sea

Wyong Shire was a local government area located in the Central Coast region of New South Wales, Australia. The incorporation of the Wyong area dates back to 7 March 1906 when the entire area of the Brisbane Water Police District outside of the Town of Gosford was proclaimed as the Erina Shire. From 1 January 1947, local government in the Central Coast region was reorganised, creating Gosford Shire and Wyong Shire, which comprised Erina Shire north and east of Kulnura, Central Mangrove and Lisarow.

Until its abolition in 2016, Wyong Shire was located around the coastal lake system of Tuggerah Lake, Budgewoi Lake and Lake Munmorah. The area included a coastal strip from Bateau Bay to Budgewoi, some lakeside towns and residential areas, some inland towns on the coastal plain and a sparsely populated region to the west with the rural townships of Yarramalong, Dooralong, Jilliby, and regions of native bush surrounding Kulnura.

Wyong Shire's administrative centre was located in the town of Wyong, and the council maintained service and information centres at The Entrance, Tuggerah, and Lake Haven. In May 2016 Wyong Shire was amalgamated with the City of Gosford to form Central Coast Council. The last mayor of Wyong Shire was Doug Eaton, an independent politician.

== Suburbs and localities in the local government area ==
Suburbs, towns and localities in the Wyong Shire were:

- Alison
- Bateau Bay
- Berkeley Vale
- Blue Bay
- Blue Haven
- Budgewoi
- Budgewoi Peninsula
- Buff Point
- Canton Beach
- Cedar Brush Creek
- Central Mangrove (with parts located within the City of Gosford)
- Chain Valley Bay
- Charmhaven
- Chittaway Bay
- Chittaway Point
- Colongra
- Dooralong
- Doyalson
- Fountaindale
- Glenning Valley
- Gorokan
- Gwandalan
- Halekulani
- Hamlyn Terrace
- Jilliby
- Kangy Angy
- Kanwal
- Killarney Vale
- Kulnura (with parts located within the City of Gosford)
- Lake Haven
- Lake Munmorah
- Lemon Tree
- Little Jilliby
- Long Jetty
- Magenta
- Mannering Park
- Mardi
- Norah Head
- Noraville
- Ourimbah
- Palm Grove
- Palmdale
- Ravensdale
- Rocky Point
- San Remo
- Shelly Beach
- Summerland Point
- Tacoma
- Tacoma South
- The Entrance
- The Entrance North
- Toowoon Bay
- Toukley
- Tuggerah
- Tuggerawong
- Tumbi Umbi
- Wadalba
- Wallarah
- Warnervale
- Watanobbi
- Woongarrah
- Wyong
- Wyong Creek
- Wyongah
- Yarramalong

== Council history ==
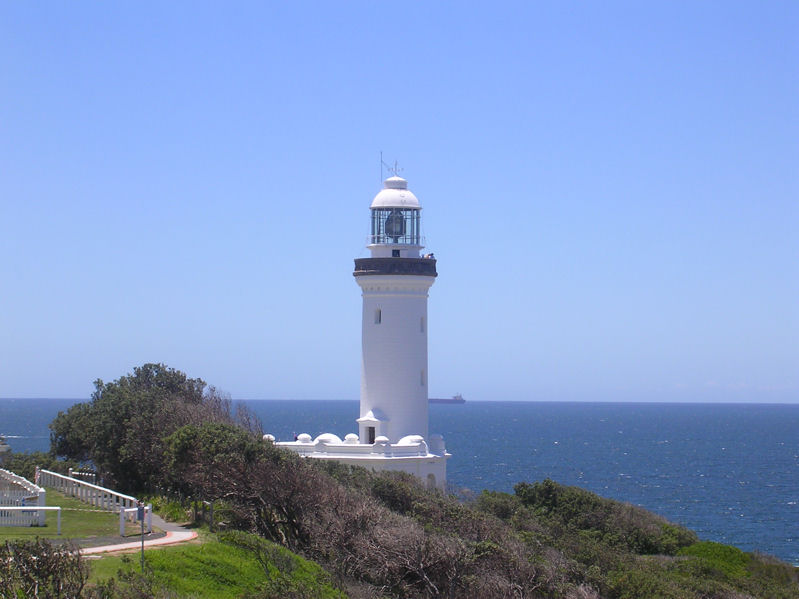
Norah Head Light, built in 1903.

=== Early history ===
The traditional Aboriginal inhabitants of the lands now known as the Brisbane Water were the Guringai people of the Eora nation. The Darkingung people occupied large areas inland west towards Rylstone, and north to Cessnock and Wollombi. The area now known as Wyong Shire developed alongside Putty Road, connecting Sydney and the Hunter Valley, with agriculture and timber forming the early industries. On the opening of the railway in 1889 to Newcastle the focus of commercial activity shifted eastward to the Town of Wyong. By 1903 the Norah Head Lighthouse was built and the first few houses and tourist accommodations began to appear along the coast.

In 1811, the Governor of New South Wales, Lachlan Macquarie, gave the first land grant in the region to William Nash, a former marine of the First Fleet. No further grants were made in the area until 1821. In 1840, the Brisbane Water Police District was proclaimed covering the area from the Hawkesbury River to Lake Macquarie and which administered local government under the control of magistrates. In 1843, the Brisbane Water District Council was proclaimed on the same boundaries as the Police District, and replaced the appointed magistrates with an elected council as part of an early attempt to establish local government administration throughout the colony. This experiment in local government was not very successful, with much public opposition focused on the issue of increased taxation, and a lack of oversight and faulty administration led to the collapse of many of these District Councils. The Brisbane Water District Council had ceased to exist by 1855, and the NSW Parliament passed the Municipalities Act in 1858, which allowed for the creation of Municipalities and Boroughs if a petition of as few as 50 signatures was presented to the government. However, no petition was ever sent from the residents of Brisbane Water to the government under this act, and local matters reverted to the police magistrates for determination.

=== Erina Shire ===
On 11 November 1886, the Town of Gosford was incorporated as the "Borough of Gosford", with an area of 1,840 acres in and around Gosford. The remaining area of the Brisbane Water Police District outside of Gosford continued to be administered by the police magistrates until 1906. From 7 March 1906, this area became the Erina Shire, when it was proclaimed by the NSW Government Gazette along with 132 other new Shires as a result of the passing of the Local Government (Shires) Act 1905. On 16 May 1906, the Shire was divided in to three Ridings (A, B, C) and five temporary Councillors were appointed (John Bourke of Kincumber, John Martin Moroney of Woy Woy, Harold Stanley Robinson of Penang, Manasseh Ward of Gosford, and Alexander Wilkinson of Wyong). The Temporary Council first met at Gosford Courthouse on 13 June 1906 and Manasseh Ward was elected as the chairman.

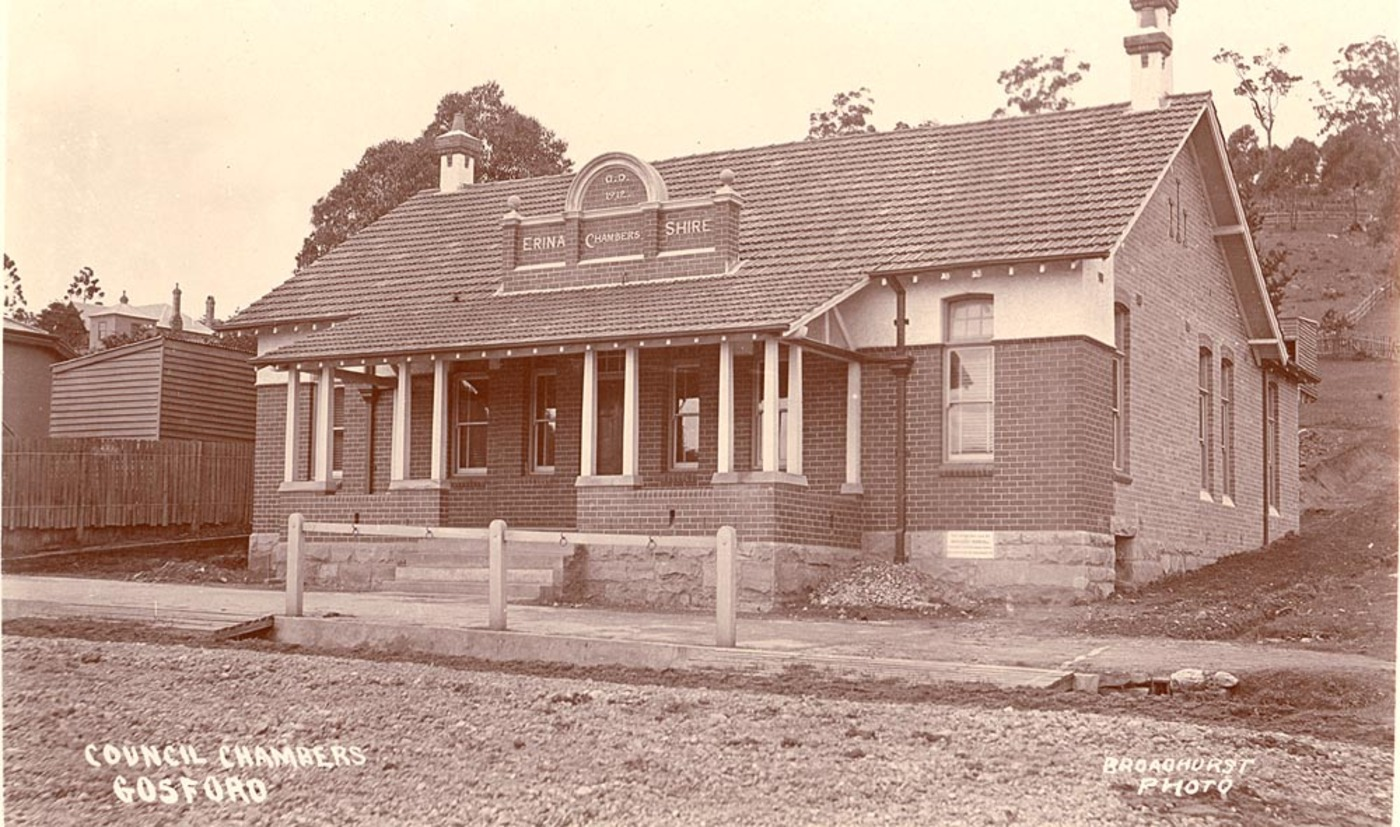
Erina Shire Chambers in Gosford, built 1912.

Following desire from Gosford to merge with Erina Shire, a proposal for a six-ward Erina Shire with Gosford becoming F Riding was subsequently proclaimed and came into effect on 23 January 1908. The new Shire Council Chambers on Mann Street, Gosford, were officially opened on 4 May 1912.

On 27 April 1928 a proposal for the separation of the Woy Woy peninsula was received and the Shire of Woy Woy was subsequently proclaimed on 1 August 1928. Following a January 1936 petition from Gosford and Point Clare residents and a public inquiry that recommended a new Gosford municipality, Erina Shire was divided again to re-form the Municipality of Gosford on 24 October 1936, including the areas of the former Gosford Municipality abolished in 1908 and also new areas from Narara to Woy Woy and Point Clare.

Following significant debate about the provision of electricity undertakings across the Central Coast, including over the split between Erina Shire and Gosford, on 16 October 1942 Gosford Municipality combined with the Shires of Erina and Woy Woy to form the Brisbane Water County Council to provide electricity to the combined area of the three councils. The County Council operated as an electricity and gas supplier and retailer and was managed by representatives of the three councils. The County Council operated until its amalgamation with the Sydney County Council from 1 January 1980.

=== Wyong Shire ===
In June 1945, Erina Shire resolved to investigate the reconstitution of local government on the Central Coast into two shires and following further discussions a formal proposal was presented to the Minister for Local Government, Joseph Cahill, in October 1945. Nevertheless, the proposal proved divisive, with Gosford and the Wyong section of Erina Shire in favour and the rest of Erina Shire and Woy Woy Shire opposed. The formal government inquiry subsequently supported the proposal and in April 1946, Cahill notified the councils of his intention to proceed. On 1 January 1947, part of Erina Shire, all of Woy Woy Shire and the Municipality of Gosford formed Gosford Shire, and the remainder of Erina Shire north and east of Kulnura, Central Mangrove and Lisarow formed Wyong Shire.

Following the changes, the new Wyong Shire Council initially rented the old Erina Shire offices in Gosford, but soon acquired some army huts from Cowra and had them moved to Wyong to serve as temporary Council Chambers, which were officially opened by Minister Joseph Cahill on 4 February 1948. These chambers were later replaced by a more substantial Council Administration Building at 2 Hely Street Wyong completed in 1959.

With Gosford establishing a Library Service in 1948, Wyong Shire took longer to deliver its own Library Service by 1959, having delayed a proposal on cost grounds in 1951, and held a referendum on the question in December 1953 which was resolved in favour of adopting the Library Act 1939. Wyong Shire Council formally adopted the act in 1958 and opened the first public library service on the ground floor of the Council Chambers in May 1959. The Wyong Library Service eventually expanded to five branches at Toukley, The Entrance, Tuggerah (1995), Lake Haven (2002), and Bay Village.

=== Establishment of Central Coast Council and abolition of Wyong Shire Council ===
In 2015 a review of local government boundaries by the NSW Government Independent Pricing and Regulatory Tribunal recommended that Wyong Shire and Gosford City councils merge to form one single council with an area of 1,681 square kilometres (649 sq mi) and support a population of approximately 331,007. This proposal was supported Wyong Shire and Gosford City councils, who had submitted the proposal to merge as part of the NSW Government's Fit for the Future reform process.

On 12 May 2016, with the release of the Local Government (Council Amalgamations) Proclamation 2016, the Central Coast Council was formed from Wyong Shire and Gosford City councils. The first meeting of the Central Coast Council was held at the Wyong Civic Centre on 25 May 2016, with meetings alternating between Gosford and Wyong.

== Water supply ==
The first centralised water supply system was implemented in Wyong in 1929–1930 when a reservoir was constructed on Chapman Hill and water was pumped to it from the Wyong River, with the northern areas of Wyong Shire covered from the 1950s. In 1965 the Entrance Water Supply Scheme officially opened, which provided water to most of Wyong Shire, which included the Mooney Mooney Dam (1961), the Mardi Dam and Wyong River Weir (1962). In 1977 Gosford and Wyong councils agreed to share the costs of operating, building and maintaining water supply throughout the region and the Gosford/Wyong Joint Water Supply Committee was established. The Committee completed construction of the Mangrove Creek Dam in 1978–1982.

This committee became the Gosford/Wyong Councils' Water Authority in 1998, but was superseded by the Central Coast Water Corporation with the passing of the Central Coast Water Corporation Act 2006 (NSW) to create one water supply authority in the region. The eventually came into effect in 2011 when the Gosford/Wyong Councils' Water Authority Board was dissolved and Water Corporation Board was appointed. The Central Coast Water Corporation ceased to exist with the amalgamation of Gosford and Wyong Councils, with the establishment of a business unit within Central Coast Council to manage water supply.

== Warnervale Airport ==
In 1972–1973, Wyong Shire Council developed a large site in Warnervale as an airstrip for light aircraft, which became Warnervale Airport. However, early on in its history, the airport was earmarked as a potential source of economic growth in the region, with the State Government's 1977 Structure Plan for the Gosford-Wyong area designating Warnervale as a regional airport for general aviation, commuter operations and airport related industry.

In 1994 Wyong Shire Council opened for expressions of interest in a large redevelopment of the Warnervale area alongside a significant upgrade of the airport, and a proposal by Traders Finance Australia to develop the airport was accepted in January 1995, with contracts being signed in July 1995. A group of local residents, supported by the state MP for Wyong, Paul Crittenden, responded by forming the Central Coast Airport Action Group, and taking the Wyong Shire Council to the Land and Environment Court to fight the move.

In the case of Jorg Michael Breitkopf v Wyong Council, which made claims against the validity of the approved Development Application for the airport development, the Court rejected the appeal and ordered payment of costs from Breitkopf, representing the residents group. However, Crittenden moved a private member's bill in parliament which was supported by Planning Minister Craig Knowles, and the Warnervale Airport (Restrictions) Act 1996 (NSW) ('WAR Act') was passed in July 1996. This Act restricted aircraft movements, the length and siting of the runway, and any future expansion of airport operations, and compensated residents for $65,000 in legal bills. This Act severely restricted development of the airport by imposing restrictions on landings and take-offs per day that ensured that a longer runway would never be economically viable, with Wyong Mayor Tony Sheridan noting that the delay in the development had "jeopardised hundreds, if not thousands, of local jobs which would be generated by the airport upgrading and the increase in tourism".

In 1999, the Wyong Shire Council proposed extending the runway to 1600 metres to cater for jet aircraft of between 50 and 116 passengers, but the plans were eventually scrapped in a council meeting in February 2003 and decided instead on other options for development, including assisting the establishment of a $100 million distribution centre for the Woolworths Group on part of the land initially earmarked for the airport upgrade. In 2015 Wyong Shire Council wrote to the Minister for Planning asking for the WAR Act to be reviewed, and publicly advocated for the Act's repeal. This set off a series of NSW Government reviews of the act to determine its future, with the most recent review in April 2020 recommending the repeal of the act. With the public release of this review, in July 2020 the Minister for Planning and Public Spaces, Rob Stokes, announced the government's acceptance of all the report's recommendations, including the act's repeal, and the Warnervale Airport (Restrictions) Repeal Bill 2020 was passed by the Legislative Assembly on 14 October 2020, receiving royal assent on 24 February 2021 .

== Demographics ==
At the 2011 census, there were 149,746 people in the Wyong Shire local government area, of these 48.3% were male and 51.7% were female. Aboriginal and Torres Strait Islander people made up 3.6% of the population which is higher than the national average. The median age of people in the Wyong Shire was 40 years; significantly higher than the national median age of 37 years. Children aged 0 – 14 years made up 20.2% of the population and people aged 65 years and over made up 18.8% of the population; 34% higher than the national average in this age bracket. Of people in the area aged 15 years and over, 46.4% were married and 15.0% were either divorced or separated.

Population growth in the Wyong Shire between the 2001 Census and the 2006 Census was 7.10%; and in the subsequent five years to the 2011 Census, population growth was 7.11%. When compared with total population growth of Australia for the same periods, being 5.78% and 8.32% respectively, population growth in the Wyong Shire local government area was on par with the national average. The median weekly income for residents within the Wyong Shire was significantly lower than the national average.

At the 2011 Census, the proportion of residents in the Wyong Shire local government area who stated their ancestry as Australian or Anglo-Saxon approached 81% of all residents (national average was 65.2%). In excess of 65.0% of all residents in the Wyong Shire nominated a religious affiliation with Christianity at the 2011 Census, which was significantly above the national average of 50.2%. Meanwhile, as at the Census date, compared to the national average, households in the Wyong Shire local government area had a lower than average proportion (6.0%) where two or more languages are spoken (national average was 20.4%); and a significantly higher proportion (91.8%) where English only was spoken at home (national average was 76.8%).

Selected historical census data for Wyong Shire local government area
Census year		1991	1996	2001	2006	2011
Population	Estimated residents on Census night	100,643	115,999	130,536	139,801	149,746
Population	LGA rank in terms of size within New South Wales				16th	
Population	% of New South Wales population	1.76%	▲1.92%	▲2.05%		2.16%
Population	% of Australian population	0.60%	▲0.65%	▲0.70%	0.70%	0.70%
Cultural and language diversity						
Ancestry, top responses	Australian					33.6%
Ancestry, top responses	English					31.5%
Ancestry, top responses	Irish					8.4%
Ancestry, top responses	Scottish					7.0%
Ancestry, top responses	German					2.3%
Language, top responses (other than English)	Italian			0.4%	0.4%	0.4%
Language, top responses (other than English)	Spanish			0.2%	▲0.3%	0.3%
Language, top responses (other than English)	Greek			0.2%	0.2%	0.2%
Language, top responses (other than English)	German			0.2%	0.2%	0.2%
Language, top responses (other than English)	Cantonese			0.2%	0.2%	0.2%
Religious affiliation						
Religious affiliation, top responses	Anglican			34.7%	▼32.0%	▼30.4%
Religious affiliation, top responses	Catholic			27.0%	▲27.4%	▲27.5%
Religious affiliation, top responses	No Religion			11.6%	▲14.5%	▲17.8%
Religious affiliation, top responses	Uniting Church			5.2%	▼4.4%	▼3.9%
Religious affiliation, top responses	Presbyterian and Reformed			3.9%	▼3.6%	▼3.2%
Median weekly incomes						
Personal income	Median weekly personal income				A$381	A$469
Personal income	% of Australian median income				81.8%	81.3%
Family income	Median weekly family income				A$770	A$1,171
Family income	% of Australian median income				75.0%	79.1%
Household income	Median weekly household income				A$1,013	A$934
Household income	% of Australian median income				86.5%	75.7%

== Council ==
=== Final composition and election method ===
Wyong Shire Council was composed of ten councillors elected proportionally as two separate wards (previously known as "ridings"), each electing five councillors. All councillors were elected for a fixed four-year term of office. The mayor was elected by the councillors at the first meeting of the council. The last election was held on 8 September 2012, and the composition of the council was:

Ward	Councillor	Party	Notes
A Ward	Doug Vincent	Labor	Elected 2008–2016.
A Ward	Luke Nayna	Liberal	Elected 2012–2015. Resigned 11 September 2015, no by-election held.
A Ward	Greg Best	Independent	Elected 1995–2016. Deputy Mayor 1996–1997, 2001–2002. Mayor 2002–2004.
A Ward	Adam Troy	Save Tuggerah Lakes	Elected 2012–2016.
A Ward	Ken Greenwald	Labor	Elected 2012–2016.
B Ward	Lynne Webster	Liberal	Elected 2008–2016. Deputy Mayor 2012–2016.
B Ward	Bob Graham	Independent	Elected 1999–2016. Mayor 2005–2007, 2008–2010, 2011–2012. Deputy Mayor 1999–2000, 2002–2004, 2010–2011.
B Ward	Lisa Matthews	Labor	Elected 2008–2016. Deputy Mayor 2009–2010.
B Ward	Lloyd Taylor	Save Tuggerah Lakes	Elected 2012–2016.
B Ward	Doug Eaton	Independent	Elected 1991–2016. Mayor 1995–1996, 2010–2011, 2012–2016.

A referendum was held on 8 September 2012, and an absolute majority of voters resolved in favour of the election of the mayor by electors for a four-year term, which necessarily increases the number of councillors by one. The change was to take effect at the next elections in September 2016, but Wyong Shire ceased to exist on 12 May 2016. With the first elections of Central Coast Council on 9 September 2017, former A Ward Councillors Doug Vincent and Greg Best were elected to Central Coast Council for Budgewoi Ward and former B Ward Councillor Lisa Matthews was elected to The Entrance Ward.

== Shire Presidents and Mayors ==
The office of Shire President was retitled "Mayor" by the Local Government Act 1993 (NSW) from 1 July 1993.

#	Shire President	Term start	Term end	Time in office	Notes
1	Albert Charles Leslie Taylor	January 1947	13 December 1948		
2	Robert Brownlee	13 December 1948	8 December 1952	3 years, 361 days	
3	Owen Chapman	8 December 1952	15 December 1953	1 year, 7 days	
4	Horace Fulcher	15 December 1953	December 1962		
5	Wilfred Barrett	December 1962	December 1970		
6	Charles Hinds	December 1970	September 1971		
7	Hugh Chalmers	September 1971	September 1974		
8	Francis Farrell	September 1974	September 1982		
9	Tony Sheridan (ALP)	September 1982	September 1985		
10	Stephen Cutler	September 1985	September 1987		
–	Francis Farrell	September 1987	September 1988		
11	Leonard Payne	September 1988	September 1989		
–	Tony Sheridan (ALP)	September 1989	30 June 1993		
#	Mayor	Term start	Term end	Time in office	Notes
–	Tony Sheridan (ALP)	1 July 1993	September 1996		
12	Doug Eaton (IND)	September 1996	September 1997		
13	Fay Brennan (ALP)	September 1997	September 1998		
14	Cliff Russell (ALP)	September 1998	September 1999		
–	Fay Brennan (ALP)	September 1999	19 September 2001		
15	Neil Rose (ALP)	19 September 2001	19 September 2002	1 year, 0 days	
16	Gregory Best (LIB)	19 September 2002	15 April 2004	1 year, 209 days	
17	Brenton Pavier (LIB)	15 April 2004	21 September 2005	1 year, 159 days	
18	Bob Graham (LIB)	21 September 2005	15 September 2007	1 year, 359 days	
19	Warren Welham (ALP)	15 September 2007	1 October 2008	1 year, 16 days	
–	Bob Graham (IND)	1 October 2008	15 September 2010	1 year, 349 days	
–	Doug Eaton (IND)	15 September 2010	21 September 2011	1 year, 6 days	
–	Bob Graham (IND)	21 September 2011	3 October 2012	1 year, 12 days	
–	Doug Eaton (IND)	3 October 2012	12 May 2016	3 years, 222 days	

== Shire Clerks and General Managers ==
The office of Shire Clerk was retitled "General Manager" by the Local Government Act 1993 (NSW) from 1 July 1993.

Shire Clerk	Term	Notes
Jack Golding	1 January 1947 – 1973	
John S. Dawson	1973 – 30 June 1993	
General Manager	Term	Notes
John S. Dawson	1 July 1993 – September 2003	
Kerry Yates	September 2003 – 17 May 2010	
Michael Whittaker	17 May 2010 – 14 September 2015	
Chief Executive Officer	Term	Notes
Rob Noble (Acting)	14 September 2015 – 12 May 2016	

== Sister cities ==
Wyong Shire was a sister city to Tanabe, Wakayama Prefecture, Japan, and Southland District, New Zealand until 2010 when ties were severed for financial reasons.

== Heritage listings ==
The first heritage listings within Wyong Shire were made under the Wyong Local Environmental Plan 1991, with 93 heritage items. In 2011, Wyong Council completed a review of existing heritage items and recommended 62 additional heritage items (including 2 conservation areas) to be incorporated into the new Wyong Local Environmental Plan 2013, bringing the total number of heritage-listed sites in Wyong Shire to 159. The Wyong Shire area has a diverse range of heritage listings and conservation areas, including those listed on the New South Wales State Heritage Register (SHR), Section 170 Registers (s.170), and the Wyong Local Environmental Plan 2013 (LEP):

- Norah Head, Bush Street: Norah Head Lightstation Precinct (SHR & LEP)
- Noraville, 3 Elizabeth Drive: Hargraves House, Noraville (SHR & LEP)
- Ourimbah, Pacific Highway: Ourimbah railway station (s.170 & LEP)
- The Entrance, 71–78 The Entrance Road: The Entrance Hotel (LEP)
- The Entrance, 199–209 The Entrance Road: The Lakes Hotel (LEP)
- The Entrance, Ocean Parade: The Entrance Ocean Pools (SHR & LEP)
- Wyong, 2 Hely Street: Wyong Shire Council Chambers (LEP)
- Wyong, Pacific Highway: Wyong railway station (s.170 & LEP)
- Wyong, 98 Pacific Highway: Rural Bank (former) (LEP)
- Wyong, 8 Rankens Court: Wyong Public School (Former) (LEP)
- Yarramalong, Yarramalong Road: St Barnabas Anglican Church (SHR & LEP)
