= Central Coast Highway =

Highway in New South Wales, Australia

Central Coast Highway New South Wales
- Coordinates: 33.425931°S 151.287740°E (Southwest end); 33.199505°S 151.522660°E (Northeast end)

General information
- Type: Highway
- Length: 49.9 km (31 mi)
- Gazetted: 9 August 2006
- Route number(s): A49 (2013–present); Entire route
- Former route number: State Route 83 (1979–2013); National Route 1 (1955–1979) (Kariong–Gosford)

Major junctions
- Southwest end: Pacific Motorway; Wisemans Ferry Road; Kariong, New South Wales
- Wyong Road; Main Road; Pacific Highway
- Northeast end: Wyee Road; Doyalson, New South Wales

Location(s)
- Major settlements: Gosford, Erina, Bateau Bay, The Entrance, Noraville, Budgewoi

Highway system
- Highways in Australia; National Highway • Freeways in Australia; Highways in New South Wales

Central Coast Highway is a 50-kilometre (31 mi) highway through the Central Coast region of New South Wales, Australia. It connects Pacific Motorway (M1) at Kariong with Pacific Highway (A43) at Doyalson. The highway was named after the region it goes through, to provide an easily identifiable route for visitors to the region, and is designated route A49.

== Route ==
Central Coast Highway commences at the intersection with Wisemans Ferry Road and the southbound ramps of Pacific Motorway at Kariong and heads east in an easterly direction as a four-lane, single-carriageway road widening into a 6-lane, dual-carriageway road through West Gosford, then narrows back to a four-lane, single-carriageway once past the Brian McGowan Bridge in central Gosford, and then follows Dane Drive and Masons Parade through Gosford, York and Victoria and George Streets through East Gosford, The Entrance Road from Erina to The Entrance, Oakland Avenue and Coral Street through The Entrance, Wilfred Barrett Drive from The Entrance North to Noraville, along Budgewoi Road from Noraville to Budgewoi, and finally along Scenic Drive from Budgewoi, where the highway terminates at the intersection with Pacific Highway and Wyee Road in Doyalson.

== History ==
The passing of the Main Roads Act of 1924 through the Parliament of New South Wales provided for the declaration of Main Roads, roads partially funded by the State government through the Main Roads Board (MRB). Great Northern Highway was declared (as Main Road No. 9) on 8 August 1928, running from Kariong to Gosford (and continuing south via Peat's Ferry and Hornsby to North Sydney, and northwards via Swansea and Newcastle to Hexham). With the passing of the Main Roads (Amendment) Act of 1929 to provide for additional declarations of State Highways and Trunk Roads, this was amended to State Highway 9 on 8 April 1929. On 26 May 1931, it was re-declared as part of State Highway 10 and renamed Pacific Highway.

Main Road 335 was declared from Long Jetty to The Entrance (and continuing west via Tumbi Umbi to Tuggerah), and Main Road 336 was declared from the intersection with Main Road 335 at Long Jetty to the intersection with Pacific Highway at Gosford, on the same day, 26 April 1933. Main Road 509 was declared from Wyee to the intersection with Pacific Highway in Doyalson on 27 September 1939, but was later extended past Doyalson via Budgewoi to Noraville (and continuing west to the intersection with Pacific Highway at Kanwal) on 4 April 1951; Main Road 335 was extended north, from The Entrance via The Entrance North to the intersection with Main Road 509 in Noraville, on 22 February 1967, shortly before construction on the replacement The Entrance Bridge commenced.

The passing of the Roads Act of 1993 through the Parliament of New South Wales updated road classifications and the way they could be declared within New South Wales. Under this act, Central Coast Highway was declared as Highway 30 on 9 August 2006, from the Gosford Interchange with Pacific Motorway at Kariong via Gosford, Erina, Bateau Bay, The Entrance and Noraville to the intersection with Pacific Highway at Doyalson, subsuming Main Road 336; the eastern end of Main Roads 335 and 509 were truncated to meet Central Coast Highway at Long Jetty and Noraville respectively. This declaration also subsumed a portion of State Highway 10 (Pacific Highway) between Kariong and the Brian McGowan Bridge in Gosford, lengthening the existing gap of Highway 10 through Gosford (removed in November 1996) from Kariong to northern Gosford. The highway today, as Highway 30, still retains this declaration.

As part of the original alignment of the former Pacific Highway, it was signed National Route 1 in 1955, and then replaced by State Route 83 in 1979, from Kariong to Gosford. With the conversion to the newer alphanumeric system in 2013, this was replaced with route A49 for the entire length of the declared highway.

=== Upgrades ===
A 4.4-kilometre (2.7 mi) section of the highway between Carlton Road at Erina and Ocean View Drive at Wamberal was upgraded to two lanes per direction with a dividing median in 2012 and 2013. The intersections with Brisbane Water Drive and Manns Road were combined into a single intersection and completed in November 2015.

As of December 2020, a 3.8-kilometre (2.4 mi) section of the highway between Tumbi Road at Wamberal and Bateau Bay Road at Bateau Bay is proposed to be upgraded to two lanes per direction with a dividing median.

== Major junctions ==
Central Coast Highway is entirely contained within the Central Coast Council local government area.

Location	km	mi	Destinations	Notes
Kariong	0.0	0.0	Pacific Motorway (M1 southwest) – Berowra, Wahroonga, Sydney; Wisemans Ferry Road (B83 north) – Somersby	Southwestern terminus of highway and route A49
Narara Creek	5.1	3.2	Henry Kendall Bridge	
Gosford	6.2	3.9	Riou Street, to Pacific Highway (north) – Ourimbah, Wyong	Eastbound exit and westbound entry only
Gosford	6.3	3.9	Brian McGowan Bridge over Main North railway line	
Gosford	7.1	4.4	Mann Road (north) – Gosford	T intersection
Bateau Bay–Long Jetty–Shelly Beach tripoint	25.2	15.7	Wyong Road (B74 west) – Tuggerah; Shelly Beach Road (east) – Shelly Beach	Roundabout
Tuggerah Lake	29.4– 25.9	18.3– 16.1	The Entrance Bridge	
Noraville–Norah Head boundary	40.1	24.9	Main Road (B70) – Toukley, Warnervale	
Budgewoi	43.4	27.0	Ourringo Street, to Elizabeth Bay Drive – Lake Munmorah	
Doyalson	49.9	31.0	Pacific Highway (A43) – Bushells Ridge, Swansea, Newcastle	
Doyalson	49.9	31.0	Wyee Road – Wyee, Morisset	Northeastern terminus of highway and route A49
1.000 mi = 1.609 km; 1.000 km = 0.621 mi: Incomplete access; Route transition

== See also ==
- Highways in Australia
- List of highways in New South Wales
