= Magenta, New South Wales =

Magenta Central Coast, New South Wales
- Coordinates: 33°17′56″S 151°32′35″E
- Population: 332 (SAL 2021)
- Established: 1991
- Postcode(s): 2261
- Elevation: 27 m (89 ft)
- Location: 6 km (4 mi) NE of The Entrance; 18 km (11 mi) ESE of Wyong; 29 km (18 mi) NE of Gosford; 59 km (37 mi) S of Newcastle; 105 km (65 mi) NNE of Sydney
- LGA(s): Central Coast Council
- County: Northumberland
- Parish: Wallarah
- State electorate(s): Wyong
- Federal division(s): Dobell
Suburbs around Magenta:
	Noraville	Norah Head
Tuggerah Lake	Magenta	Tasman Sea
The Entrance North		Pacific Ocean

Magenta (/mədʒɛntə/) is a coastal location of the Central Coast region of New South Wales, Australia. It is part of the Central Coast Council local government area, and contains a significant portion of the Wyrrabalong National Park.

Magenta was officially recognised as a locality in 1991. Previously it was the location for rutile mining and as the garbage tip for The Entrance, New South Wales. The location is traversed south–north by Wilfred Barrett Drive linking The Entrance and Toukley. The road was designated part of the Central Coast Highway in 2006.

== Magenta Shores ==
The Magenta Shores Golf Resort consists of an 18-hole golf course, private housing and a resort.

== Demographics ==
As of the 2021 census, Magenta had a population of 332. The majority of residents (66.9%) were born in Australia, with the next most common countries of birth being England (7.2%), the United States of America (3.0%), and South Africa (1.8%). The most common ancestries were English (39.5%), Australian (25.9%), and Irish (16.0%). English was the primary language spoken at home by 84.0% of the population, while other languages included Spanish (1.2%), Hindi (1.2%), and Italian (0.9%).

The most common religious affiliations were No Religion (25.9%), Catholic (25.0%), and Anglican (19.6%), with Christianity overall representing 67.8% of the population. Additionally, 3.0% of the population identified as Aboriginal and/or Torres Strait Islander.
