= The Entrance Bridge =

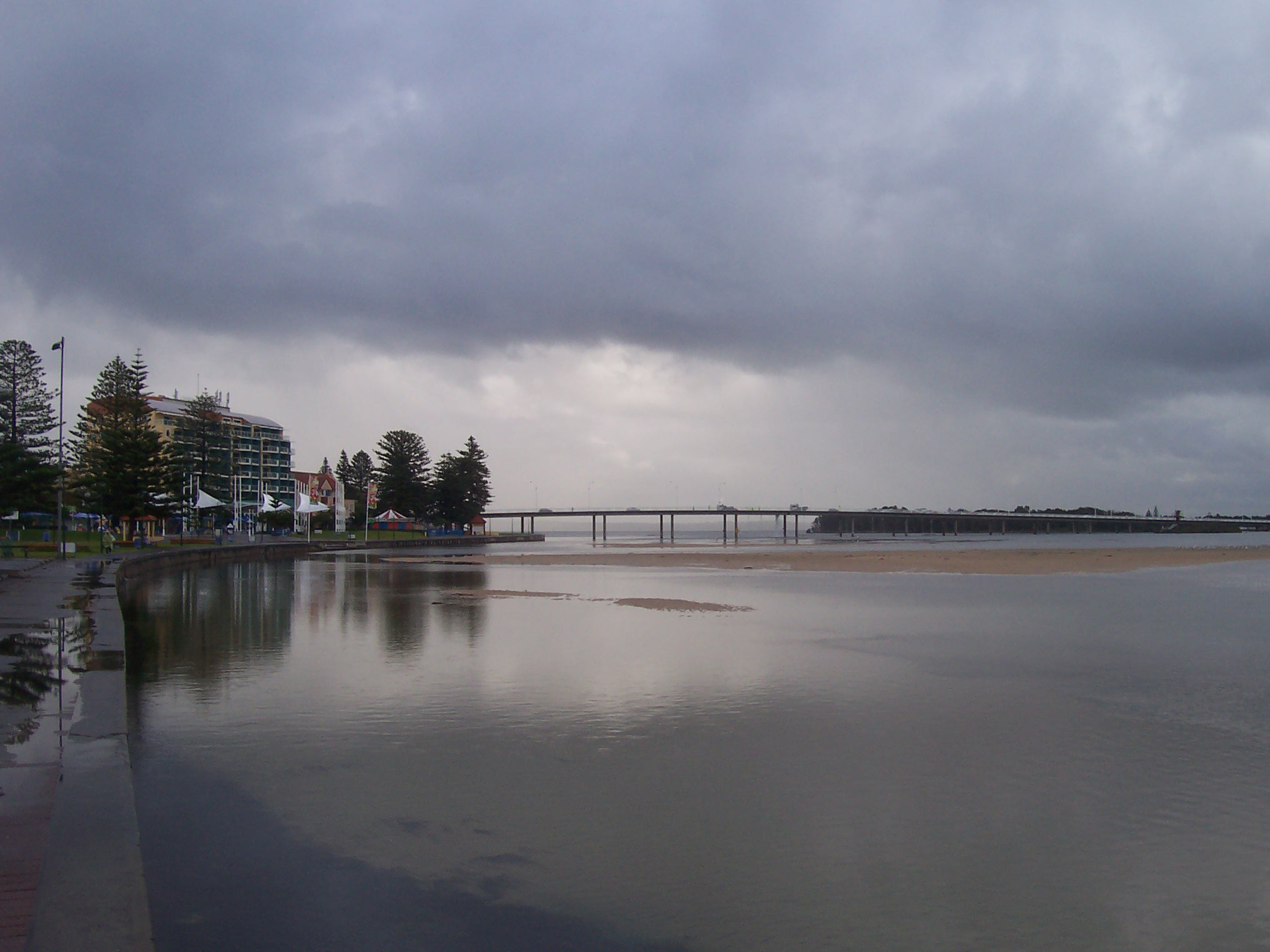
- The 1968 Entrance Bridge
- Coordinates: 33°20′15″S 151°30′02″E
- Carries: Central Coast Highway / Wilfred Barrett Drive: Motor vehicles; Grade-separated pedestrian footpath; Grade-separated cycleway
- Crosses: Tuggerah Lakes
- Locale: The Entrance, Central Coast, New South Wales, Australia
- Named for: The Entrance Channel
- Maintained by: Transport for NSW

Characteristics
- Design: Girder bridge
- Material: Concrete
- Total length: 467 metres (1,532 ft)
- No. of spans: 18

History
- Construction start: 17 July 1967
- Opened: 20 December 1968
- Inaugurated: 14 April 1969 by the Hon. Robert Askin, NSW Premier
- Replaces: Entrance Bridge (1934–c. 1968)

Location
- Interactive map of The Entrance Bridge

The Entrance Bridge is a road bridge that carries the Central Coast Highway (A49) across the Tuggerah Lakes Entrance Channel and joins the towns of The Entrance and The Entrance North, located on the Central Coast of New South Wales, Australia. The 18-span, 467-metre-long (1,532 ft) concrete girder bridge carries road traffic, as well as a grade-separated pedestrian footpath and cycleway, across Wilfred Barrett Drive as part of the Central Coast Highway.

The bridge is maintained by Transport for NSW, an agency of the Government of New South Wales.

== History ==
Opened for traffic on 15 December 1934, the inaugural Entrance Bridge was originally a wooden single lane bridge with bypass bays at intervals that allowed traffic travelling in the opposite direction to pass. The original bridge was adequate until 1965 as it only served traffic travelling as far as The Entrance North.

Around 1955, the Number 11 bus operated by Red Bus Services crashed through a wooden retaining wall and landed in The Entrance Channel after its brakes failed while turning onto The Entrance Bridge. The driver and three passengers were uninjured, although the boat that the bus landed on was heavily damaged.

In 1965, Wilfred Barret Drive was opened by the Deputy Premier Pat Hills. The road was named after Councillor Wilfred Barret who was a member of the first Wyong Shire Council. The road continues to be an important link between The Entrance and Toukley, passing through Wyrrabalong National Park.

By the end of 1965 the bridge was dangerous and too costly to maintain. The traffic flow over the old bridge at The Entrance increased to such an extent the structure was under constant repair. Work began on the current two lane, concrete structure on 17 July 1967 after a successful tender by Transbridge. The bridge was opened to traffic on 20 December 1968 and officially opened by Premier Robert Askin on 18 April 1969.

== See also ==
- List of bridges in Australia
- Tuggerah Lakes
