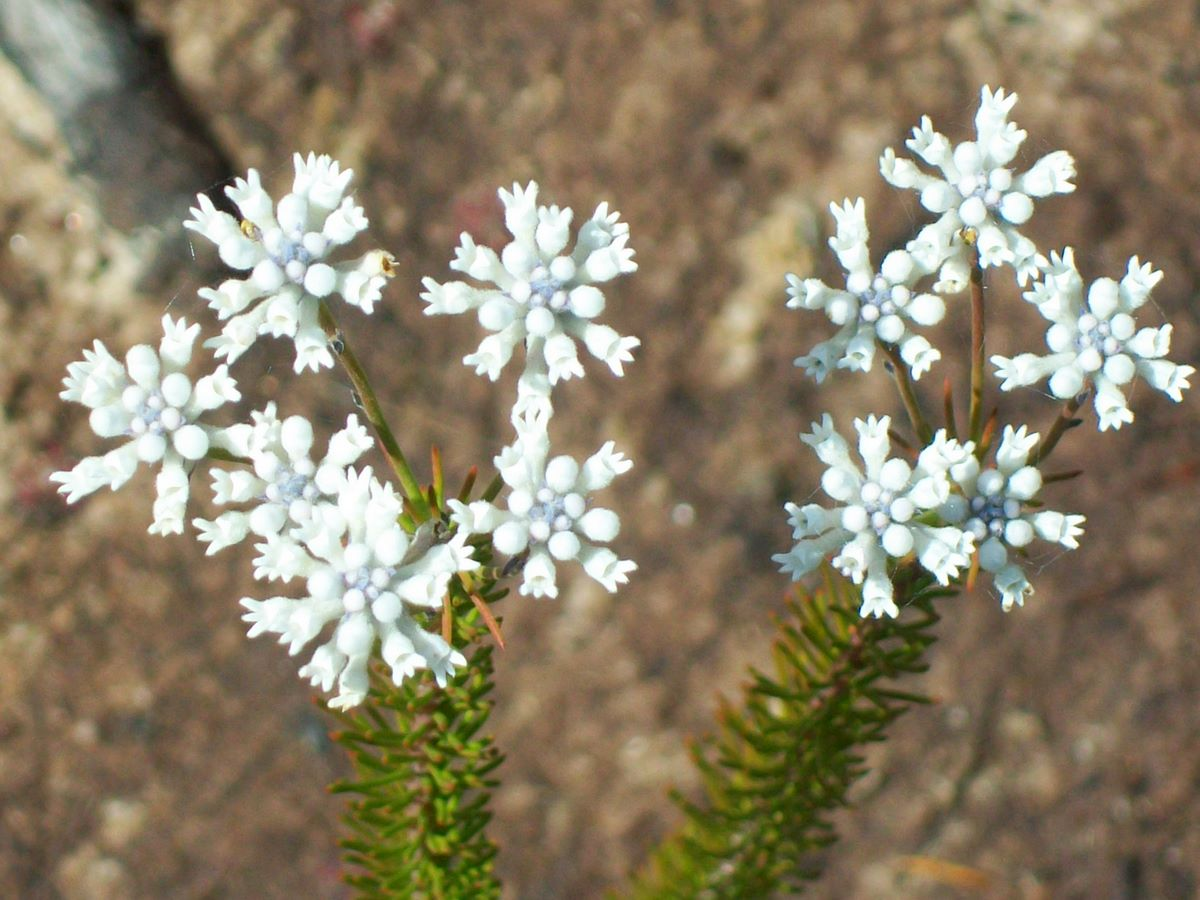
- In Ku-ring-gai Chase National Park

Scientific classification
- Kingdom: Plantae
- Clade: Tracheophytes
- Clade: Angiosperms
- Clade: Eudicots
- Order: Proteales
- Family: Proteaceae
- Genus: Conospermum
- Species: C. ericifolium

Binomial name
- Conospermum ericifolium Sm.

= Conospermum ericifolium =

Species of shrub native to Australia

Conospermum ericifolium is a flowering plant of the family Proteaceae and is endemic to eastern Australia. It is a slender, erect shrub with linear leaves, panicles of cream-coloured to white flowers and hairy, golden nuts.

== Description ==
Conospermum ericifolium is a slender, erect shrub that typically grows to a height of 50–80 cm (20–31 in), sometimes to 1.5 m (4 ft 11 in) and has long, thin branches. The flowers are arranged in panicles of head-like spikes or in dense spikes, on hairy peduncles 14–46 mm (0.55–1.81 in) long. The bracteoles are 2.8–3.4 mm (0.11–0.13 in) long and 1.75–2.5 mm (0.069–0.098 in) wide. The perianth is cream-coloured to white forming a tube 4–6 mm (0.16–0.24 in) long. The upper lip is sac-like, 1.5–1.8 mm (0.059–0.071 in) long and 1.6–2.0 mm (0.063–0.079 in) wide, the lower lip joined for 0.75–1 mm (0.030–0.039 in) with lobes 1.2–1.6 mm (0.047–0.063 in) long and 0.6–0.8 mm (0.024–0.031 in) wide. Flowering in spring, and the fruit is a nut 2–3 mm (0.079–0.118 in) long with golden hairs.

== Taxonomy ==
Conospermum ericifolium was first formally described in 1808 by James Edward Smith in Abraham Rees's Cyclopædia from specimens collected by John White. The specific epithet (ericifolium) refers to the similarity of the leaves to plants in the genus Erica .

== Distribution and habitat ==
This species of Conospermum grows in heath and shrubby woodland from Toukley to Nowra and Jervis Bay, on the coast around Sydney.
