= Gorokan =

- Suburb
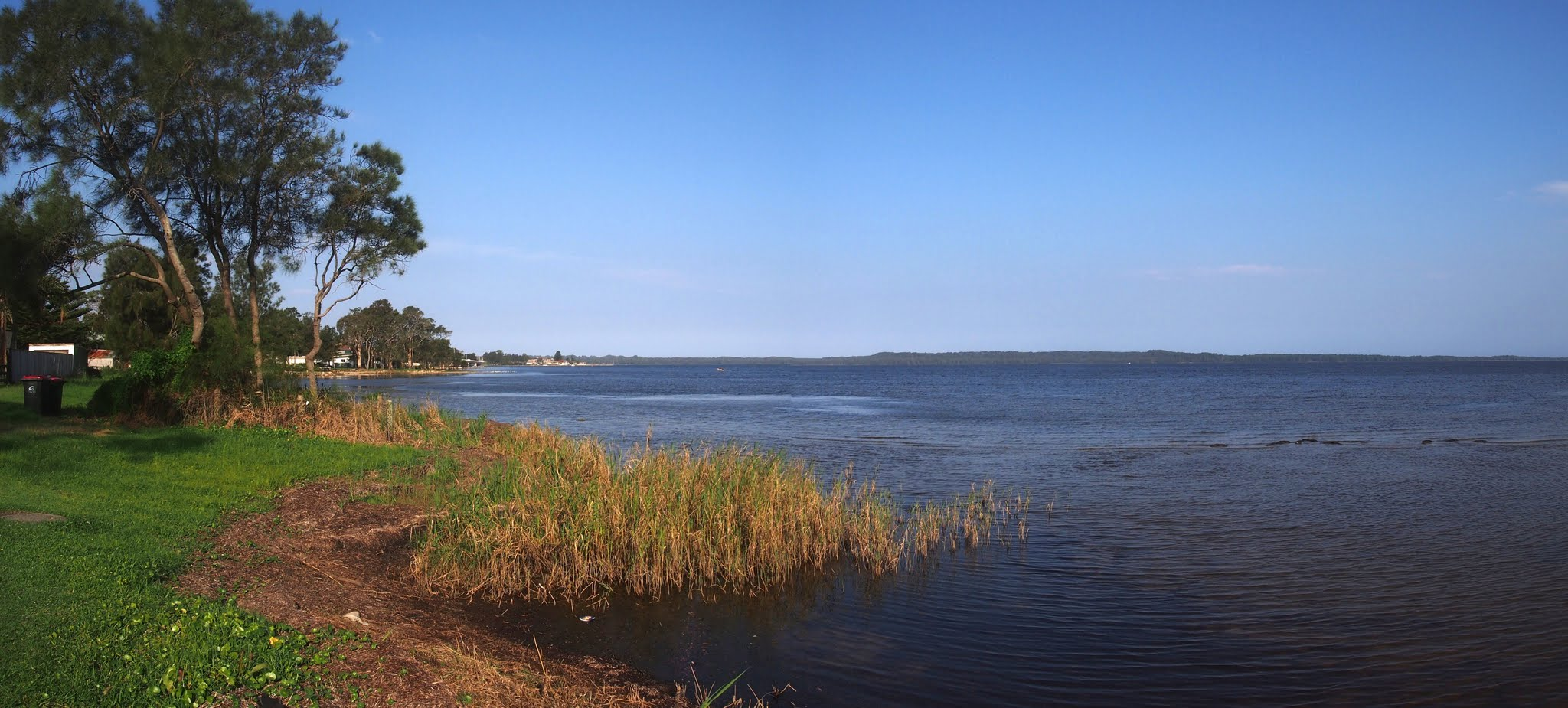
- Shore of Tuggerah Lake facing north

- Interactive map of Gorokan
- Coordinates: 33°15′25″S 151°31′05″E
- Country: Australia
- State: New South Wales
- City: Central Coast
- LGA: Central Coast Council
- Location: 17 km (11 mi) N of The Entrance; 11 km (6.8 mi) NE of Wyong; 57 km (35 mi) SW of Newcastle; 36 km (22 mi) NNE of Gosford; 106 km (66 mi) NNE of Sydney

Government
  - State electorate: Wyong
  - Federal division: Dobell

Area
  - Total: 3.1 km^{2} (1.2 sq mi)
- Elevation: 10 m (33 ft)

Population
  - Total: 8,367 (2016 census)
  - Density: 2,700/km^{2} (6,990/sq mi)
- Postcode: 2263
- Parish: Munmorah
Suburbs around Gorokan
Charmhaven	Lake Haven	Budgewoi Lake
Kanwal	Gorokan	Budgewoi Lake
Tuggerah Lake		Toukley

Gorokan (/ɡɔːrəkən/) is a suburb of the Central Coast region of New South Wales, Australia. Gorokan faces towards the Tuggerah Lake and the Budgewoi Lake on the western shores. It is part of the Central Coast Council local government area.

The word "Gorokan" means "The Morning Dawn" from the language of the Awabakal (an Aboriginal tribe). There are two schools in the area, Gorokan Public School and Gorokan High School.

== History ==
Electricity was first brought to the area as a part of a $42,000 programme for electricity reticulation under the Brisbane Water County Council. Located on the shores of Lake Tuggerah, Gorokan has long been a holiday destination with the Quoy family first buying land in the area in 1923 where they built and rented a series of holiday homes. Other families such as the Gedlings (by way of Gordon and Margaret Gedling) built a holiday house on the Gorokan waterfront in 1956.
