= The Entrance North =

- Suburb
- Interactive map of The Entrance North
- Coordinates: 33°19′55″S 151°30′04″E
- Country: Australia
- State: New South Wales
- City: Central Coast
- LGA: Central Coast Council
- Location: 2 km (1.2 mi) NE of The Entrance; 19 km (12 mi) E of Wyong; 25 km (16 mi) NE of Gosford; 61 km (38 mi) S of Newcastle; 101 km (63 mi) NNE of Sydney

Government
  - State electorate: The Entrance
  - Federal division: Dobell

Area
  - Total: 1 km^{2} (0.39 sq mi)
- Elevation: 3 m (9.8 ft)

Population
  - Total: 1,392 (2011 census)
  - Density: 1,400/km^{2} (3,600/sq mi)
- Postcode: 2261
- Parish: Wallarah
Suburbs around The Entrance North
Tuggerah Lake		Magenta
Tuggerah Lake	The Entrance North	Pacific Ocean
The Entrance

The Entrance North (colloquially "North Entrance") is a coastal village in The Entrance District of the Central Coast region of New South Wales, Australia. It is at the end of a peninsula with Tuggerah Lake to the west and the Tasman Sea to the east. To the south is The Entrance Channel in which flows Tuggerah Lake and on the southern shore is The Entrance. Crossing the channel by foot or road is via The Entrance Bridge. It is part of the Central Coast Council local government area.

== Education ==
Children from The Entrance North are in the area for The Entrance Public School and Our Lady of the Rosary School. The former The Entrance North Public School closed in 1989 due to low enrolments, having operated for ca. 65 years. The site is currently an annex of Glenvale Special School.

== Transport ==
The Entrance North is serviced by The Entrance Red Bus Service with routes mainly going south to The Entrance and from there to Gosford or Wyong. There is a route which continues north to Toukley and Wyong Hospital. As a flat area the area is easy to cycle around and to cross the bridge to connect with the Tuggerah Lakes bike track at Picnic Point. The closest railway station is Tuggerah railway station which is serviced by the Central Coast & Newcastle Line.

== Shops ==
The Entrance North has a corner shop for milk, bread, soft drinks. The main shopping and commercial area is across the bridge at The Entrance where Coles supermarket, bakery, banks, RMS, library, post office, cafes and other mainly independent retailers trade.

== Demographics ==
As of the 2021 census, The Entrance North had a population of 1,619. The majority of residents (81.7%) were born in Australia, with the next most common countries of birth being England (2.5%) and New Zealand (2.0%).

The most common ancestries were Australian (42.3%), English (39.2%), and Irish (12.2%). English was the primary language spoken at home by 88.8% of the population, while other languages included Italian (0.7%), Arabic (0.6%), and Afrikaans (0.4%).

The most common religious affiliations were No Religion (36.8%), Catholic (25.9%), and Anglican (16.3%), with Christianity overall representing 56.6% of the population. Additionally, 5.4% of the population identified as Aboriginal and/or Torres Strait Islander.
