= Gorokan High School =

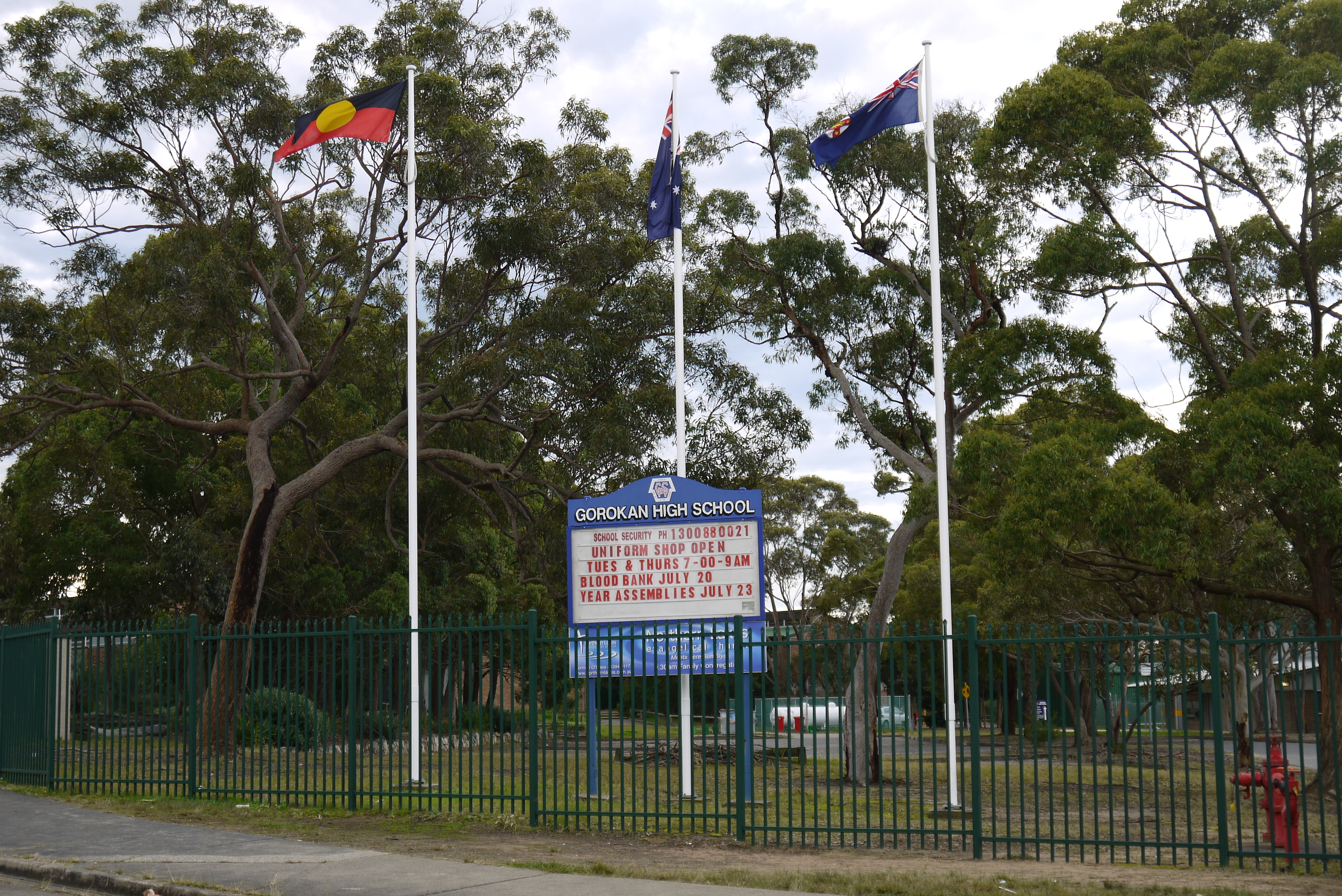
- The sign at the main entry to the school

Location
- Goobarabah Avenue, Lake Haven, Central Coast region, New South Wales; Australia; 33°14′32″S 151°30′31″E

Information
- Type: Government-funded co-educational dual modality partially academically selective and comprehensive secondary day school
- Motto: Respect, Responsibility, Personal best
- Established: 1976; 50 years ago
- Educational authority: New South Wales Department of Education
- Principal: Matthew Boake
- Teaching staff: 74.9 FTE (2018)
- Years: 7–12
- Enrolment: 963 (2018)
- Houses: Barnett (red); Dixon (blue); Norah (green); Hargraves (yellow)
- Colours: Blue, white and red
- Slogan: Cooperation, Respect, Personal Best, Empowerment
- Website: gorokan-h.schools.nsw.gov.au

Gorokan High School is a government-funded co-educational dual modality partially academically selective and comprehensive secondary day school, located in Lake Haven, in the Central Coast region of New South Wales, Australia.

Established in 1976, the school enrolled approximately 950 students in 2018, from Year 7 to Year 12, of whom 16 percent identified as Indigenous Australians and seven percent were from a language background other than English. The school is operated by the NSW Department of Education; the principal is Matthew Boake.

== Overview ==
The school draws its name from the nearby settlement of Gorokan; and was housed in temporary buildings in Dudley Street on the site of what was to later become Gorokan Public School in 1977. It moved to its current location in Goobarabah Avenue in 1978.

Its inaugural principal was Gwen Foley, who was the first female high school principal on the NSW Central Coast. She retired in December 1982. Foley chose the inaugural school motto "And Joy in the Making", referring to the making of a young adult as well as the establishment of the school itself.

== Co-curricular activities ==
=== Musical achievements ===
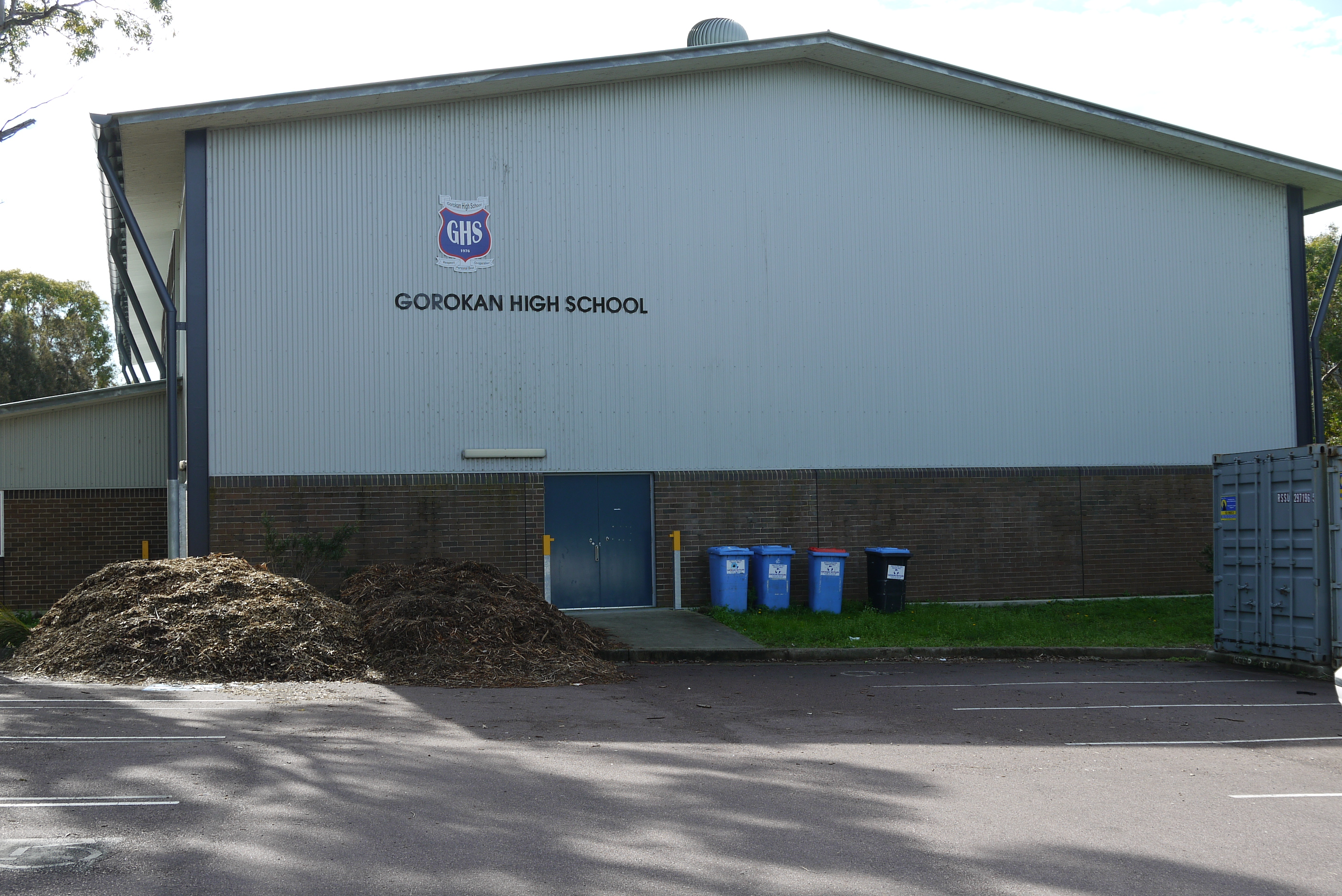
New Performing Arts Hall built under the BER programme

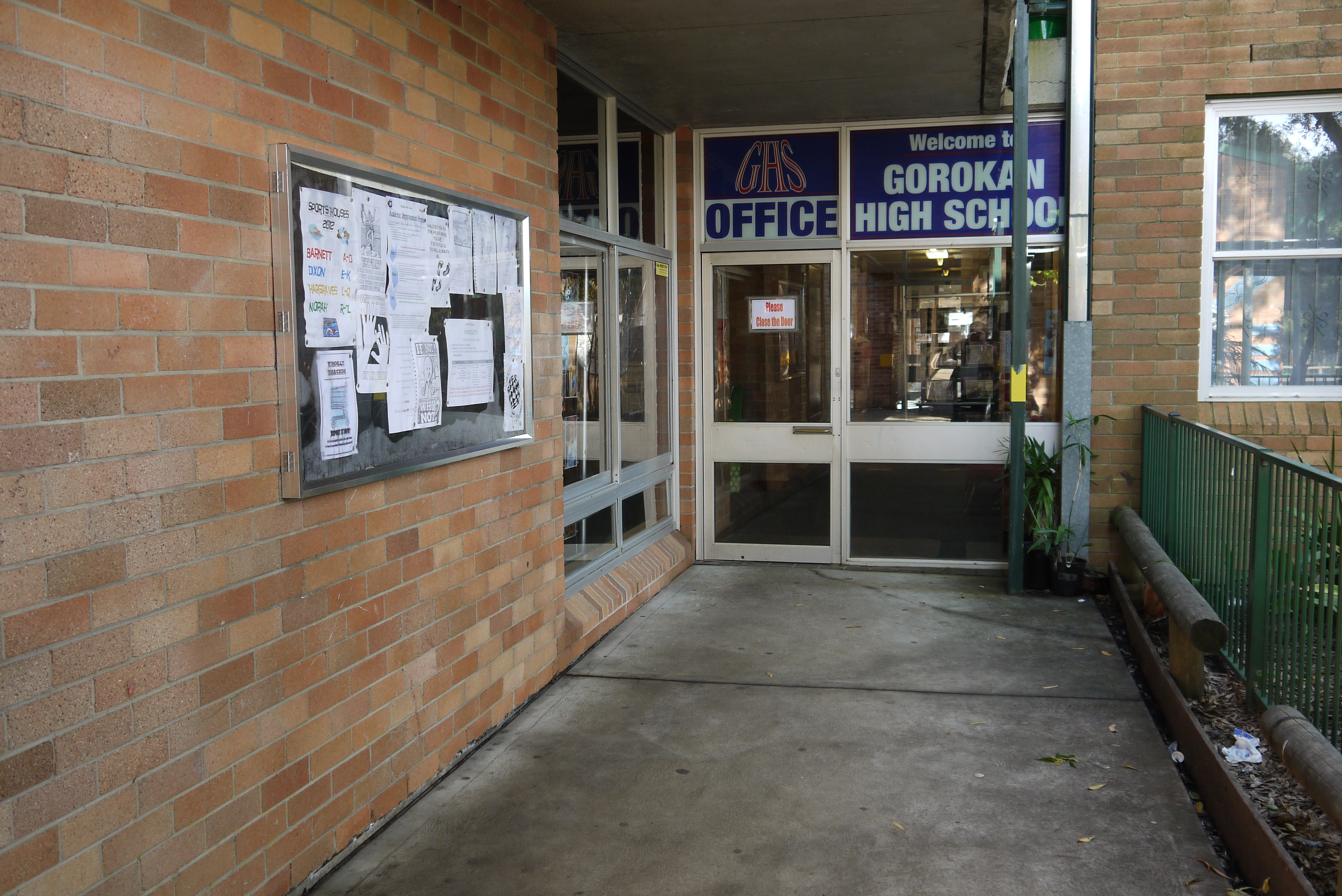
Entrance to the main administration section

Gorokan High School has been referred to as a lighthouse school in music. It was one of 25 schools referenced in the National Review of Music Education in 2005 where it was noted as having an enduring music programme on account of its notable success over a period of 25 years. The classroom programme was developed in partnership with the University of Newcastle music education staff - in particular Dr Carol Richards - in the period 1986 to 2005.

An instrumental music programme was in place from 1990 until 2006, with roots as far back as 1980. The school's wind orchestra was recognised internationally for its performances.

In 1994 the Gorokan High School musicians were selected to represent Wyong Shire at the World Resort Expo, Wakayama, Japan.

The 57-member wind orchestra was invited to perform at the 1999 Banff International Festival of School Orchestras and Bands, where the orchestra was chosen to make the final performance, for which they received the festival's only standing ovation.

The wind orchestra was going to take a 2003 tour of China however the SARS outbreak prevented the trip.

=== Online mentoring ===
Gorokan has successfully trialled The Smith Family's OnTrack online mentoring programme which has produced a marked increase in engagement by students and school attendance.

=== Plan-it Youth mentoring ===
Gorokan High School has run a successful Youth Mentoring Programme called "Plan-it Youth", supported by the Department of Education, plus Teen Spirit Foundation and community volunteers.

=== Water conservation initiative ===
The school successfully bid to the Australian Government Water Fund for over A$45,000 for a water conservation initiative that will save 442,000 litres (97,000 imp gal; 117,000 US gal) of water each year.

== Capital improvements ==
=== Skill centre ===
Gary Hardgrave, Minister for Vocational and Technical Education, on 17 January 2005 announced A$350,000 funding for the construction of a skill centre at Gorokan.

=== Operation Facelift ===
Operation Facelift was a $350,000 Gorokan High School community project, undertaken from 2002 to 2005. Major sponsors included the Telstra Kids Foundation, Delta Electricity, Wyong Shire Council, Wyong councillors and the Department of Education. Operation Facelift received mention in State Parliament and was nominated for an Australia Day Award 2004. Liz Rushton, District Superintendent for the Department of Education and Training presented a Certificate of Appreciation to Ms O'Neill in Education Week 2003.

== Notable alumni ==
- Matthew McConaughey – an American actor and producer who attended Gorokan High as a Rotary exchange student for 12 months in 1988.
- Jai Opetaia – a Samoan Australian professional boxer; competed in the 2012 London Olympics while a Gorokan High School student
- Jesse Ramien – an Indigenous Australian professional rugby league player; Currently plays centre for the Cronulla Sharks

== See also ==
- List of government schools in New South Wales
- List of selective high schools in New South Wales
- New South Wales selective schools
