= Budgewoi Lake =

Lagoon in New South Wales, Australia

- Location within New South Wales

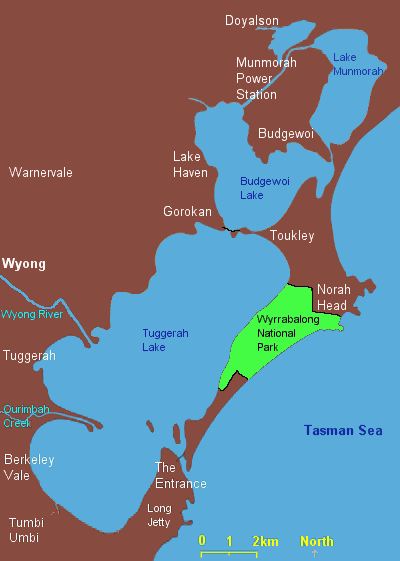
- The Budgewoi Lake, the middle of the three Tuggerah Lakes
- Location: Central Coast, New South Wales, Australia
- Coordinates: 33°15′S 151°32′E
- Part of: Tuggerah Lakes, Central Coast catchment
- Primary inflows: Lake Munmorah
- Primary outflows: Tuggerah Lake
- Basin countries: Australia
- Surface area: 1,400 ha (3,500 acres)
- Surface elevation: 0 m (0 ft)
- Settlements: Budgewoi

The Budgewoi Lake is a lagoon that is part of the Tuggerah Lakes, that is located within the Central Coast Council local government area in the Central Coast region of New South Wales, Australia. The lake is located near the settlement of Budgewoi and is situated about 100 kilometres (62 mi) north of Sydney.

== Features and location ==
Drawing its catchment from a small creek and the southern half of Lake Munmorah, Budgewoi Lake is located north of Wallarah Point and is bounded by Toukley, Budgewoi, Buff Point, Charmhaven and Gorokan. To the south of the lake, the Tuggerah Lake drains excess water, that flows to the Tasman Sea of the South Pacific Ocean, via The Entrance. When full, Budgewoi Lake covers an area of around 1,400 hectares (3,500 acres).

== See also ==
- List of lakes of Australia
