= Tuggerah Lakes =

Eastern Australian lake system

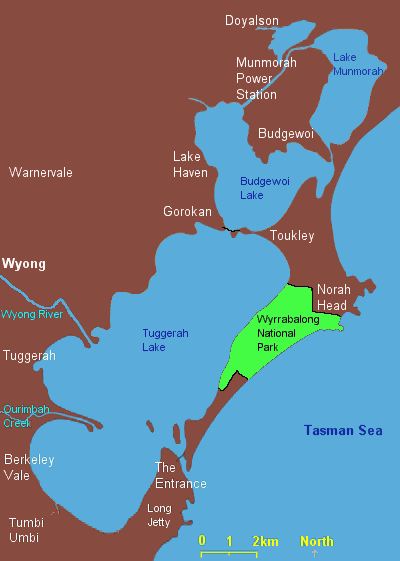
Tuggerah Lakes map

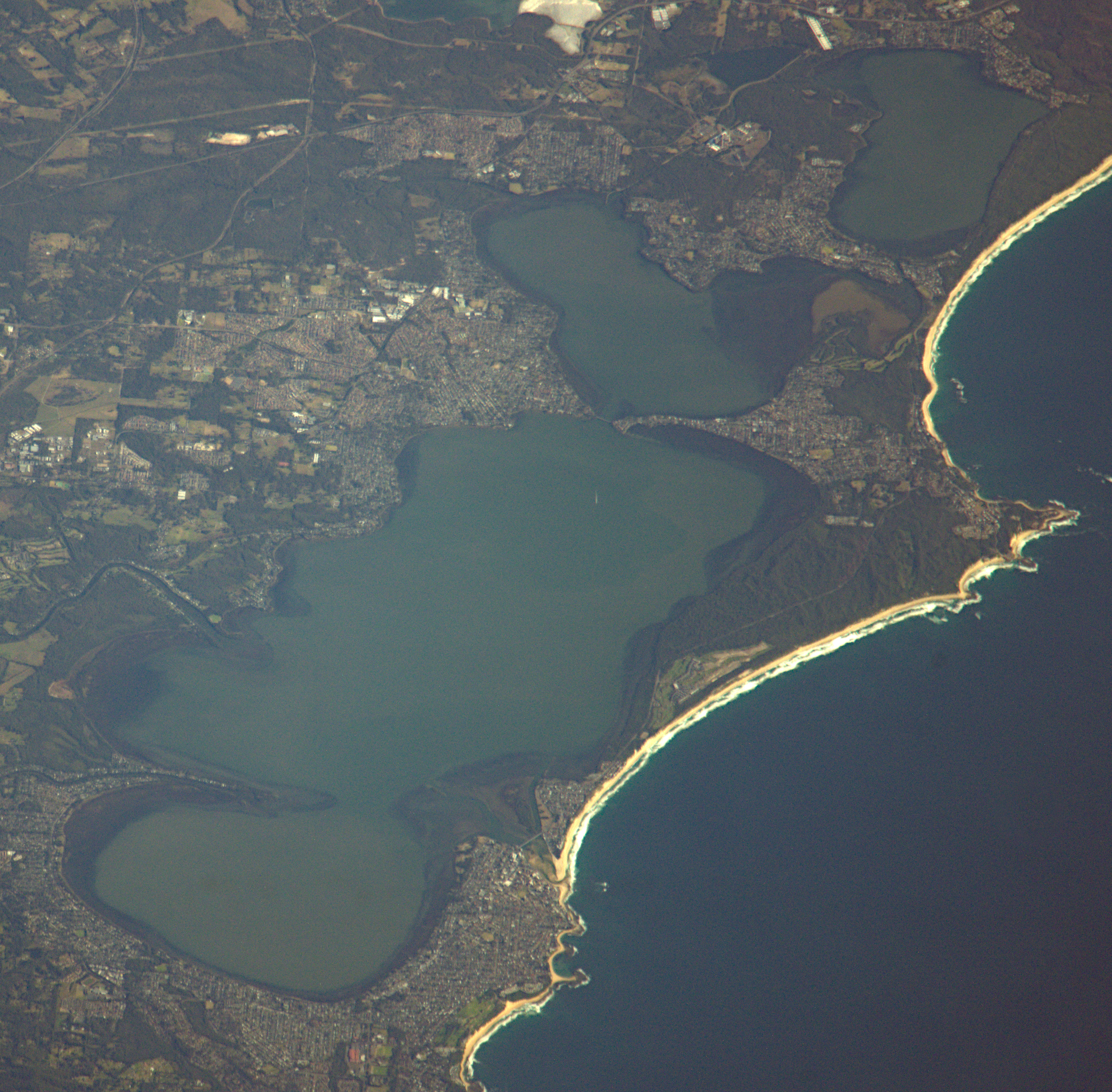
ISS astronaut photograph, 2013

The Tuggerah Lakes, a wetland system of three interconnected coastal lagoons, are located on the Central Coast of New South Wales, Australia and comprise Lake Munmorah, Budgewoi Lake and Tuggerah Lake.

== History ==
The area around the Tuggerah Lakes was inhabited by the local Aborigines known as the Darkinjung people prior to European discovery in 1796. The lake system was discovered by the first Governor of Tasmania, Colonel David Collins, who had arrived on the First Fleet. They were found during the search for an escaped convict, Molly Morgan, who was thought to be living with the Aborigines to the north of the Hawkesbury River.

== Description ==
The wetland system consists of three interconnected coastal lagoons: Lake Munmorah, Budgewoi Lake and Tuggerah Lake. The three lakes cover 77 square kilometres (29.7 sq mi) and have a perimeter of 105 kilometres (65 mi). The largest of the lakes is Tuggerah Lake at 54 square kilometres (20.8 sq mi). All three lakes are shallow, with average depths of less than two metres (6.5 feet).

There is only limited movement of water between the lakes and sea through a narrow channel at The Entrance, and hence tides in the main body of the lakes are negligible. On occasions, this channel has slowly silted up with sand and the lakes have been completely cut off from the Pacific Ocean until a large flood scours out the channel again. It has been suggested that there was once a second entrance on the Budgewoi Peninsula, and although there is little evidence of this being the case since European settlement, occasionally waves do wash over the dunes into Budgewoi Lake during spring tides.

The lakes and their surroundings form part of the Central Coast Council (formerly Wyong Shire) local government area and can be crossed by road over three bridges:

- The Entrance Bridge passes over The Entrance Channel
- Toukley Bridge joins Toukley and Gorokan at the channel between Tuggerah Lake and Budgewoi Lake
- Budgewoi Bridge crosses the channel between Budgewoi Lake and Lake Munmorah at Budgewoi

== Environment ==
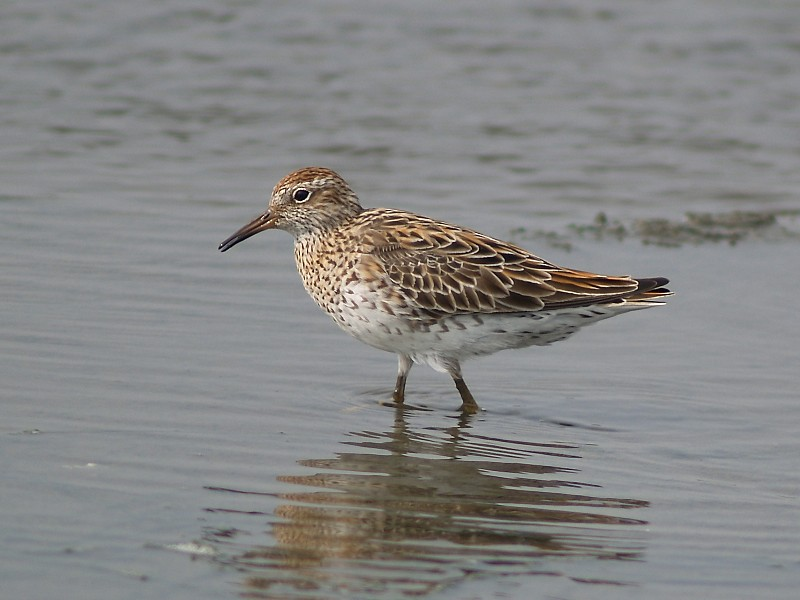
The IBA is an important site for sharp-tailed sandpipers

The northern part of the system has a legacy of industrial usage. Colongra Lake, formerly a wetland, was excavated and dammed for fly ash storage for the former Munmorah Power Station. Hammond Canal connected the power station to Lake Munmorah, supplying cooling water.

The lakes are also the main basin into which all the rivers and streams drain and they receive nutrients, chemicals and sediment from the entire area. Sediments and nutrients have been discharging into the lakes system for thousands of years although the process has greatly accelerated with urban development.

=== Important Bird Area ===
The lakes and their immediate surrounds, including the Munmorah State Conservation Area and most of the Wyrrabalong National Park, have been identified as an Important Bird Area (IBA) by BirdLife International because the shallow waters have extensive seagrass beds attracting large numbers of waterbirds, including 1% of the world populations of sharp-tailed sandpipers and chestnut teals. The adjacent forests and woodlands provide habitat for endangered swift parrots and regent honeyeaters in the non-breeding season. Australasian and black bitterns are sometimes recorded in the IBA. little egrets nest on Curly Island. Other birds using the site in relatively large numbers include black swans, curlew sandpipers and red-necked stints.

== See also ==
- List of lakes of Australia
