= Noraville =

Noraville Central Coast, New South Wales
- Coordinates: 33°15′54″S 151°34′05″E
- Population: 2,494 (2001 census)
  - Density: 1,310/km^{2} (3,400/sq mi)
- Postcode(s): 2263
- Elevation: 5 m (16 ft)
- Area: 1.9 km^{2} (0.7 sq mi)
- Location: 12 km (7 mi) NNE of The Entrance; 17 km (11 mi) E of Wyong; 34 km (21 mi) NE of Gosford; 53 km (33 mi) SSW of Newcastle; 111 km (69 mi) NNE of Sydney
- LGA(s): Central Coast Council
- Parish: Wallarah
- State electorate(s): Wyong
- Federal division(s): Dobell
Suburbs around Noraville:
	Toukley
Canton Beach	Noraville	Norah Head
	Magenta

Noraville is a suburb of the Central Coast region of New South Wales, Australia. It is part of the Central Coast Council local government area. It is the site of Edward Hargraves' property that he purchased after his discovery of payable gold.

As part of the Toukley district, Noraville has a similar elderly demographic. to that of Toukley.

== Demographics ==
As of the 2021 census, Noraville had a population of 3,001. The majority of residents (85.9%) were born in Australia, followed by England (3.6%) and New Zealand (0.9%). The most common ancestries were Australian (42.5%), English (40.9%), and Irish (14.4%). English was the primary language spoken at home by 92.2% of the population, while other languages included Swedish (0.2%), Maltese (0.2%), and Vietnamese (0.2%).

The most common religious affiliations were No Religion (39.3%), Catholic (24.7%), and Anglican (17.8%). Christianity was the largest broad religious group, encompassing 55.6% of the population.

7.8% of residents identified as Aboriginal and/or Torres Strait Islander, more than double the national average of 3.2%.

== Heritage listings ==
Noraville has a number of heritage-listed sites, including:

- 3 Elizabeth Drive: Hargraves House, Noraville
