= Wyrrabalong National Park =

National park in Australia

- IUCN category II (national park)
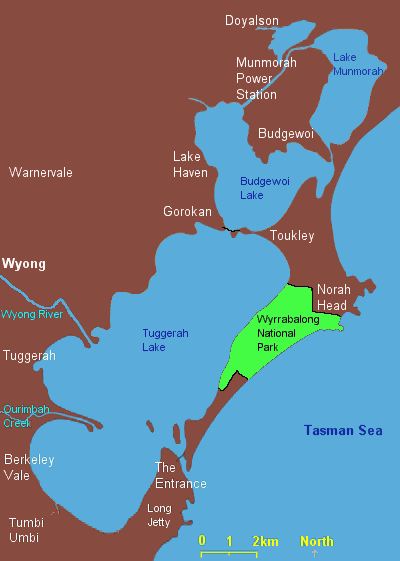
- Northern section of the national park

- Location within New South Wales
- Location: New South Wales
- Nearest city: Gosford
- Coordinates: 33°17′34.8″S 151°32′34.8″E
- Area: 6.2 km^{2} (2.4 sq mi)
- Established: May 1991
- Governing body: NSW National Parks and Wildlife Service
- Website: Official website

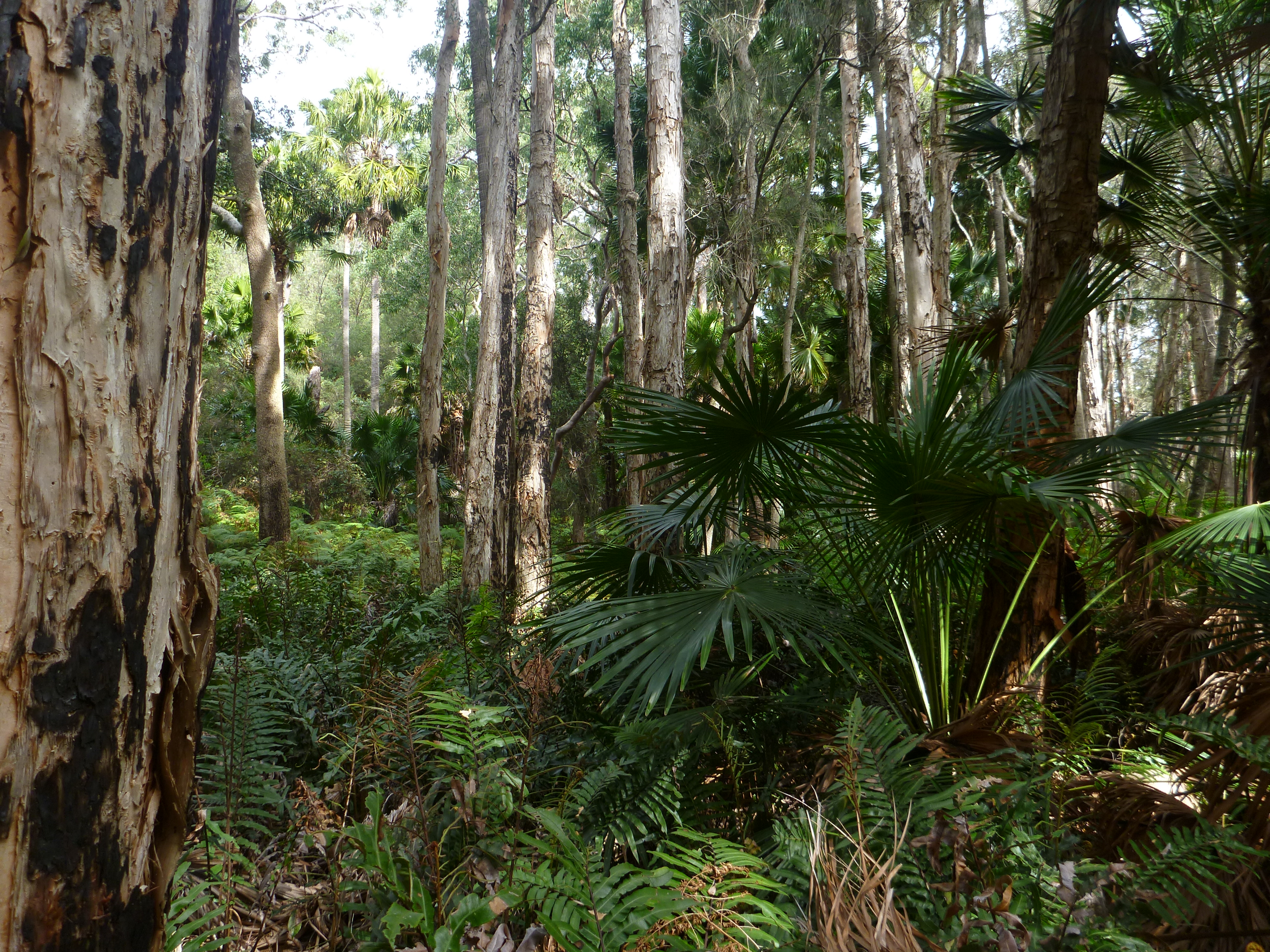
Wyrrabalong National Park

The Wyrrabalong National Park is a coastal national park that is located on the Central Coast of New South Wales, in eastern Australia. The 620-hectare (1,500-acre) national park consists of two sections; the northern section consists of approximately 480 hectares (1,200 acres) and covers a substantial area of the peninsula between The Entrance and Norah Head as well as Terilbah and Pelican Islands within Tuggerah Lake. The southern section consists of about 120 hectares (300 acres) of the coast, from Shelly Beach south to Forresters Beach. The park is also noted for containing the last significant coastal (littoral) rainforest on the Central Coast.

Most of the park lies in the Tuggerah Important Bird Area, identified as such by BirdLife International because of its importance for a variety of water and woodland birds.

The average elevation of the terrain is 8 metres.

== History ==
The land now occupied by Wyrrabalong National Park was first inhabited by the indigenous Darkinjung and Awabakal peoples. The Darkinjung occupied the southern section and The Awabakal occupied the northern section. It is believed Europeans first discovered the Tuggerah Lakes in 1796. It was found by Governor of Tasmania, Colonel David Collins, who had arrived on the First Fleet, during the search for an escaped convict, Mary Morgan, who was said to be living with the Aborigines to the North of the Hawkesbury River.

== Weather ==
The average summer temperature is between 20 °C and 25 °C, and the record measured temperature is 42.4 °C, in winter the temperature is between 10 °C and 17 °C, and the lowest measured temperature is 3.4 °C.

== See also ==
- Protected areas of New South Wales
