= The Entrance Ocean Pools =

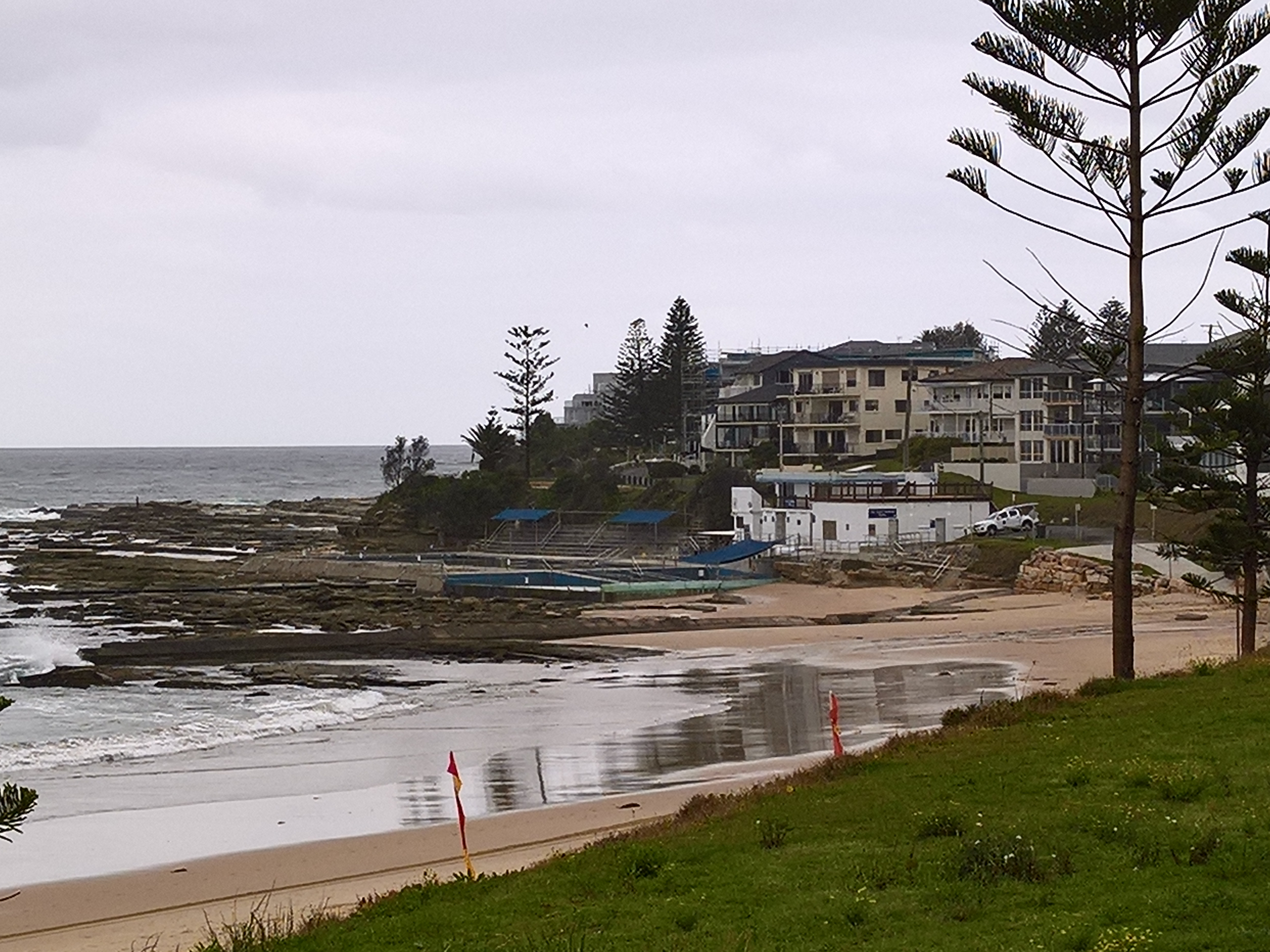
- The Entrance Ocean Pools, 2018

- Location within New South Wales Location within Australia
- 33°21′01″S 151°30′12″E
- Location: The Entrance, Central Coast, New South Wales, Australia

History
- Built: 1938–1965

Site notes
- Owner: Central Coast Council

New South Wales Heritage Register
- Official name: The Entrance Ocean Pools; The Entrance Ocean Baths
- Type: State heritage (landscape)
- Designated: 22 August 2003
- Reference no.: 1663
- Type: Swimming Pool – tidal
- Category: Urban Area
- Builders: Erina Shire Council

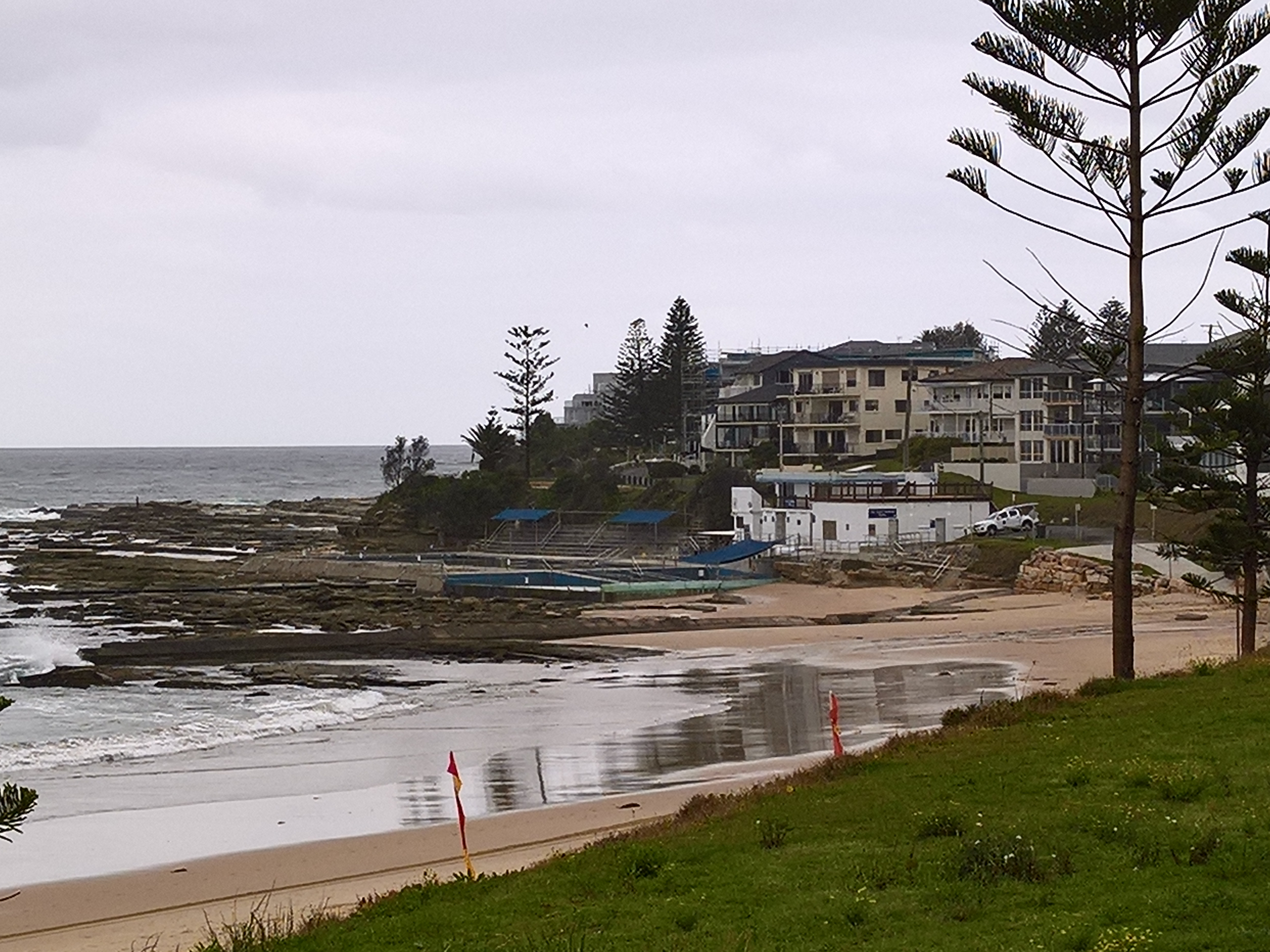
The Entrance Ocean Pools

The Entrance Ocean Pools is a heritage-listed swimming pool and beach located at Ocean Parade, The Entrance in the Central Coast local government area of New South Wales, Australia. The pools were built from 1938 to 1965 by the Erina Shire. It is also known as The Entrance Ocean Baths. The property is owned by the Central Coast Council and was added to the New South Wales State Heritage Register on 22 August 2003.

== History ==
The 50-metre (160 ft), seven lane, Olympic size pool was constructed from 1938 by the Erina Shire Council using the approximate site of an earlier rock pool known as "Roberts' Pool", but closer to the shoreline. The development of the site coincides with the cultural shift from secluded bathing primarily for therapeutic and hygiene reasons to swimming as a recreational and competitive sporting activity promoted for its health benefits. The expansion of the site coincides with the growth of amateur swimming clubs and the consequent demand for suitable venues. Hence many municipal councils built new facilities or enlarged existing rock pools as is the case here. The baths also provided a safe alternative recreational and swimming environment to the dangerous surf beach.

The pool located on a natural rock platform was filled through tidal action, often taking a week to fill. It was drained every six to eight weeks via a channel blasted through the rock platform at the southern end of the pool. Workers would scour the walls and natural rock bottom as the water slowly receded.

The pool was upgraded in the 1940s with the addition of a pumping station and pipeline. At the same time a swimming club was established, which raised funds for various works including a club house, and Erina Shire Council built a toilet and change rooms just south of the pool.

In 1951 further improvements were made to the pool with a concrete floor and sides being placed over the excavated rock. The Entrance Amateur Swimming Club was formed on 10 July 1953. The inaugural President was Fred Lewis. In 1965 a Baby Wading Pool and the medium-sized pool known as the "Fred Lewis Pool" were added. In April 1967 the Tuggerah Tuffs a winter swimming club were formed. In 1995 minor pump upgrading and reticulation works were completed.

The Entrance was a popular summer holiday destination for people from the working classes and rural communities. The Entrance Amateur Swimming Club and the Entrance Ocean Baths provided free swimming lessons during summer to local residents and tourists alike. As a major seaside tourist destination many people from across NSW first learnt to swim at The Entrance Ocean Baths.

== Description ==
Three concrete and rock pools, being a main 50-metre (160 ft) Olympic pool, a wading pool and an intermediate pool, set into and on a rocky shore, with two brick structures containing toilets, change rooms, kiosk, club/meeting room and storage area. A concrete concourse physically unites these elements with rows of concrete tiered seating on the western edge, and various stairs and ramps. There are fixed shade structures over the intermediate pool and the southern end of the tiered seating.

It was assessed as being in "fair condition" in 1994 and 2009.

=== Modifications and dates ===
The following modifications have been made to the pools:
1940 – intermediate and wading pools built, along with pump station and pipeline.
1950s – concrete pool floor and sides laid over excavated rock.
1965 – wading and intermediate pools built.
1970s – pipeline enlarged, pool floor renewed, concourse constructed.
1995 – pump upgrading and reticulation works.

== Heritage listing ==
The Entrance Ocean Baths is the only ocean pool on the Central Coast. Constructed between 1938 and 1965 the complex of three pools and associated facilities have historic and technical significance because they demonstrate the evolution of ocean baths in the twentieth century. The transformation of a simple rock pool to a complex of ocean baths located on the tidal rock platform coincides with the growth of the amateur swimming movement and the consequent demand for suitable venues for the sport. The development of the site also reflects a broader societal and cultural shift away from secluded bathing primarily for therapeutic and hygiene reasons to swimming as a recreational and competitive sporting activity promoted for its health benefits.

The site of the baths was known to Aboriginal people as a natural fish trap and has the potential to demonstrate the link between the prior selection and use of sites by Aboriginal people and their subsequent use and adaption by Europeans.

The Entrance Ocean Baths have been a focal point for communal recreation, swimming education and competitive swimming since 1938. As a popular tourist destination for working and rural people the baths are held in high esteem by the many generations of local residents and tourists who were first taught to swim there.

The baths are associated with the Entrance Amateur Swimming Club established in 1953 and the Tuggerah Tuffs, a winter swimming club established in 1967. Christine Deakes, a member of the Amateur Swimming Club represented Australia at the 1968 Olympics in Mexico.

The Entrance Ocean Baths reflect a type of community facility that is no longer constructed due to the problems associated with the aggressive marine environment, public health and safety and changes in community expectations.

The Entrance Ocean Pools was listed on the New South Wales State Heritage Register on 22 August 2003 having satisfied the following criteria.

The place is important in demonstrating the course, or pattern, of cultural or natural history in New South Wales.

The Entrance Ocean Pools are historically significant because they demonstrate the evolution of a simple rock pool known to Aboriginal people as a natural fish trap to a complex of ocean baths. The expansion of the site between 1938 and 1965 coincides with the growth of amateur swimming clubs and the pursuit of swimming as a sport.

The place has a strong or special association with a person, or group of persons, of importance of cultural or natural history of New South Wales's history.

The Entrance Ocean Baths are associated with The Entrance Amateur Swimming Club (est. 1953) and the "Tuggerah Tuffs" a winter swimming club (est. 1967). A member of The Entrance Amateur Swimming Club, Christine Deakes was selected for the 1968 Olympic Games in Mexico. The site of the baths is also associated with the Aboriginal people of the area who recognised the rock shelf as a natural fish trap.

The place is important in demonstrating aesthetic characteristics and/or a high degree of creative or technical achievement in New South Wales.

The Entrance Ocean Baths have high aesthetic value as an oceanic landmark due to their siting at the southern end of The Entrance's main surf beach and the way in which they unite land and sea in a low scale, horizontal built form.

The place has a strong or special association with a particular community or cultural group in New South Wales for social, cultural or spiritual reasons.

The Entrance Ocean Baths have been a focal point for recreation, swimming education and competitive swimming since 1938. The Entrance is notable as a holiday destination for working people and rural communities. It provides evidence of the major popularity of swimming as a competitive and recreational sport in Australia. The popularity of the pool and the expansion of its facilities is closely linked to the growth and activities of the amateur swimming movement. The high esteem with which the baths are held is attested to by the collection of 9,310 signatures supporting the heritage listing of the baths.

The place has potential to yield information that will contribute to an understanding of the cultural or natural history of New South Wales.

The Entrance Ocean Pools have research significance for their ability to demonstrate both documentary and physical evidence of the technical evolution of ocean baths in the 20th Century and the cultural and societal changes which promoted such development. The site also has the potential to demonstrate the link between the prior selection and use of sites by Aboriginal people and their subsequent use and adaption by Europeans.

The place possesses uncommon, rare or endangered aspects of the cultural or natural history of New South Wales.

The Entrance Ocean Baths are one of only nine ocean pools built on the NSW coast in the 1920s and 1930s and the only one on the Central Coast.

The place is important in demonstrating the principal characteristics of a class of cultural or natural places/environments in New South Wales.

The Entrance Ocean baths reflect a type of community facility that are no longer constructed due to problems associated with the aggressive marine environment, public health and safety and changes in community expectations.

== See also ==
- Ocean pools in Australia
- McIver Women's Baths
