= Toukley =

- Suburb
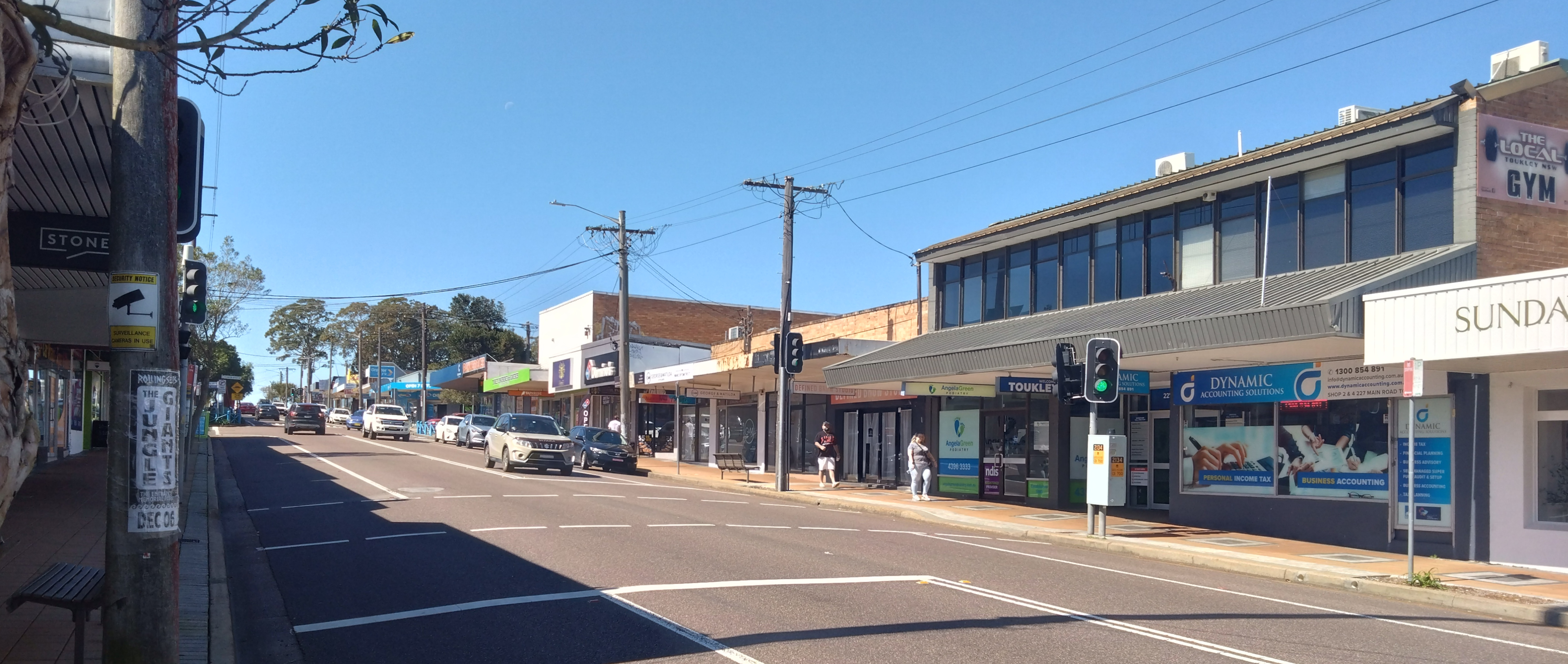
- Main Road, Toukley

- Interactive map of Toukley
- Coordinates: 33°16′S 151°32′E
- Country: Australia
- State: New South Wales
- City: Central Coast
- LGA: Central Coast Council
- Location: 35 km (22 mi) NE of Gosford; 14 km (8.7 mi) E of Wyong; 14 km (8.7 mi) NNE of The Entrance; 54 km (34 mi) SSW of Newcastle; 109 km (68 mi) NNE of Sydney

Government
  - State electorate: Wyong
  - Federal division: Dobell

Area
  - Total: 3 km^{2} (1.2 sq mi)
- Elevation: 13 m (43 ft)

Population
  - Total: 4,557 (SAL 2021)
- Postcode: 2263
Suburbs around Toukley
Budgewoi Lake	Budgewoi
Gorokan	Toukley	Pacific Ocean
Tuggerah Lake	Canton Beach	Noraville

Toukley (/tuːkliː/ TOO-klee) is a town in the Central Coast region of the Australian state of New South Wales and is located within Central Coast Council. It lies approximately 109 km north of Sydney and 54 km south of Newcastle via the Pacific Motorway (M1). It is located between Tuggerah Lake, Budgewoi Lake, and the Pacific Ocean. At the channel connecting Tuggerah Lake and Budgewoi Lake the new Toukley bridge was constructed between 1983 and 1985 linking Toukley on the eastern side of the Lakes system with Gorokan on the west, replacing the old two lane wooden bridge.

Toukley also provides various forms of accommodation to tourists including motels, caravan parks, holiday houses and lake cabins.

== Name ==
The town was originally called Toukley Oukley, said to be the Aboriginal name for the place. According to historian F.C. Bennett, it means "many brambles". Many places in the region have doubled names of this form, like Kangy Angy, Tumbi Umbi and Mooney Mooney.

Settlers shortened it to Toukley soon after the town was founded, but it took until 1969 for the name to be officially changed.

== History ==
- 1856 – Edward Hargraves, who purported to make the first significant discovery of gold in Australia in 1851, purchased Robert Henderson's holdings and built "Norahville". Hargraves had many friendships with indigenous people of the area. Cattle were grazed as far as Buff Point and Elizabeth Bay.
- Late 1850s – Chinese fishermen worked the Tuggerah Lakes area, in particular, what is now known as Canton Beach. While not confirmed, it is believed this is where the name is derived from. It was a base for catching and curing fish that were then shipped to Queensland, the goldfields and back to China.
- 1891 – Toukley Public School founded.
- 1903 – Lighthouse built at Norah Head after many vessels were wrecked in the area. It was the site of sea battles between the Japanese Navy and Merchant navy ships in World War 2: Three ships were sunk, Nimbin (1052 tonnes) by a mine on 5 December 1940 and the fishing trawler Millimumul sank with the loss of seven men on 26 March 1941 when it trawled up a mine as well as BHP's Iron Chieftain (4812 tonnes) by a submarine on 3 June 1942. The Age (4775 tonnes) was also attacked on 3 June 1942.
- 1939 – The Toukley Bridge which joins Gorokan and Toukley originally constructed. It was replaced by the new bridge in July 1985.
- 1950 – Grace and Kathleen Holmes, aged 18 and 11, were found murdered in a swamp near Toukley, NSW, in August 1950.
- 2013 – Toukley is mentioned in the Housos episode "Tokyo"

== Demographics ==
As of the 2021 census, Toukley had a population of 4,557. The majority of residents (79.9%) were born in Australia, with the next most common countries of birth being England (3.7%) and New Zealand (1.5%). The most common ancestries were Australian (42.1%), English (40.9%), and Irish (10.7%). English was the primary language spoken at home by 88.3% of the population, while other languages included Portuguese, Greek, and Tagalog (each 0.3%). The most common religious affiliations were No Religion (38.9%), Catholic (23.3%), and Anglican (17.9%), with Christianity overall representing 54.5% of the population. Additionally, 8.2% of the population identified as Aboriginal and/or Torres Strait Islander.
