= Tuggerah Lake =

Lake in the state of New South Wales, Australia

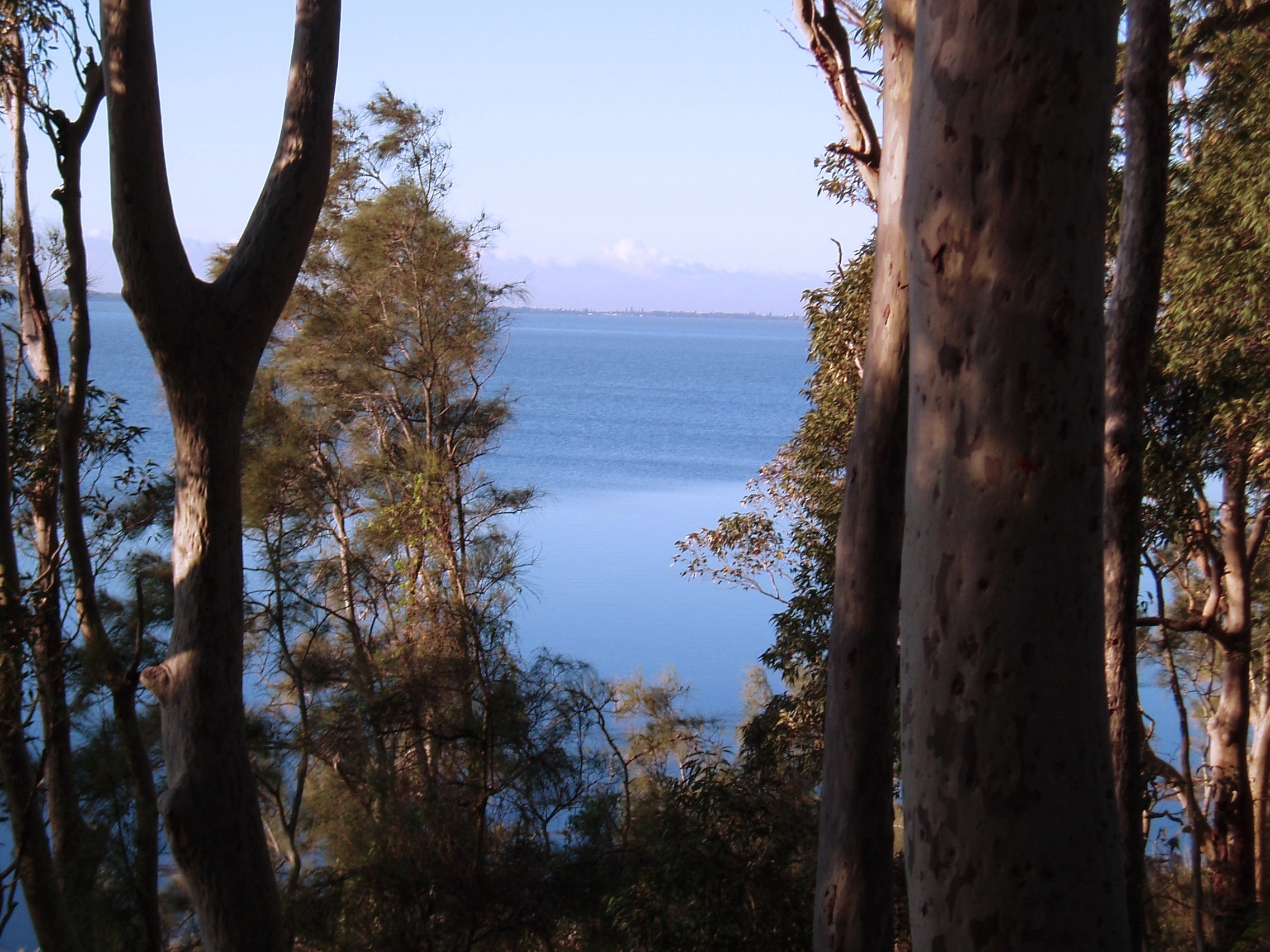
- Tuggerah Lake as viewed from Craigie Park in Kanwal. The Entrance is also visible in the distant background.

- Location within New South Wales

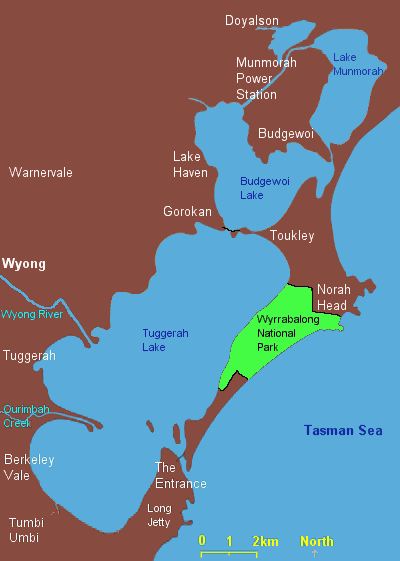
- Location: Central Coast, New South Wales, Australia
- Coordinates: 33°19′S 151°29′E
- Type: Intermittently open intermediate wave dominated barrier estuary
- Primary inflows: Wyong River
- Primary outflows: The Entrance, Tasman Sea, South Pacific Ocean
- Catchment area: 714.5 square kilometres (275.9 sq mi)
- Basin countries: Australia
- Surface area: 80.8 square kilometres (31.2 sq mi)
- Average depth: 2.4 metres (7 ft 10 in)
- Water volume: 193,231.2 megalitres (6,823.90×10^{6} cu ft)
- Surface elevation: 0 m (0 ft)
- Settlements: The Entrance, Wyong
- Website: NSW Environment & Heritage webpage

Tuggerah Lake, an intermittently open intermediate wave dominated barrier estuary that is part of the Tuggerah Lakes, is located within the Central Coast Council local government area in the Central Coast region of New South Wales, Australia. The lake is located near Wyong and is situated about 90 kilometres (56 mi) north of Sydney.

== Features and location ==
Drawing its catchment from the Wyong River, Ourimbah Creek and Tumbi Creek, at the southern half of Tuggerah Lake, the lake is generally quite shallow with an average depth of 2.4 metres (7 ft 10 in). It is connected with the Tasman Sea through a tidal channel at its southern end known as The Entrance. It is also connected with two smaller lakes, Budgewoi Lake and through that to Lake Munmorah. Tuggerah Lake has a catchment area of 714 square kilometres (276 sq mi) and a surface area of 81 square kilometres (31 sq mi). When full, Tuggerah Lake covers an area of around 5,400 hectares (13,000 acres).

Heavy rains in June 2007 caused Tuggerah Lake to flood, affecting areas of Long Jetty, Killarney Vale and Chittaway Point. On the sea side of the peninsula is Norah Head and its historic lighthouse.

=== Urban areas ===
The lake adjoins extensive areas of suburban development. Much of the original settlement bordering the lake was oriented towards domestic tourism; with Sydney residents drawn to the area and staying in camp and early cabin-style accommodation clustered around towns of The Entrance and Long Jetty, from there spreading to Toukley on the northern lakeshore.

Many towns surround the lake including Lake Munmorah, The Entrance, Killarney Vale, Berkeley Vale, Tumbi Umbi, Wyong, Kanwal, Gorokan and Toukley.

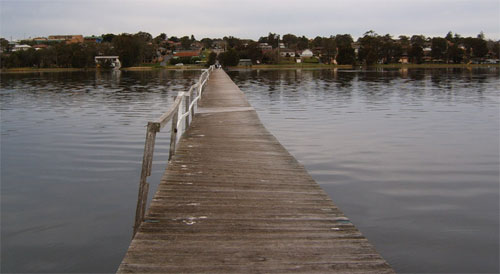
Long Jetty

South of The Entrance is Long Jetty, so named for the jetty built to service the first sub-division of land at The Entrance. The original jetty was washed away in a flood at Easter 1927; the present structure replaced it, built in 1927–28 to a length of 1,152 feet (351 m). Parts of the jetty have fallen into disrepair and it requires frequent periodic repairs and replacement of its structure and decking.

=== Fishing and boating ===
Tuggerah Lake is well known for its recreational fishing with species such as luderick, bream, flathead and whiting caught from the shoreline and boats. Prawns can be plentiful over the summer months during the dark of the new moon. Fishing in Tuggerah Lake is generally poor during late winter and early spring, particularly when westerly winds are prevalent.

Special purpose markers (coloured yellow) around Terilbah Island and Pelican Island denote areas where net and trap fishing are restricted. Other parts of the lake may have permanent or temporary fishing restrictions in force.

Due to its large size and shallow depth strong winds can whip up a steep choppy surface that can be hazardous to small boats, however Tuggerah Lake is considered quite safe for most forms of small recreational watercraft if common sense and general safe boating practices are followed. Many parts of Tuggerah Lake are quite shallow with sand or weed flats exposed at low water. Marked channels should be navigated with care and at reduced speed. Mobile phone coverage is available across the entire lake.

== Environment ==
Substantial residential and commercial development, involving excavation and alteration of native vegetation and natural watercourses in the lake catchment and hinterland, has given rise to siltation and changes in the make up of the lakebed and foreshore. During 2004 and 2005 the Tuggerah Lakes Restoration project has been attempting to restore and revive the lake system. Urbanisation and development have caused increased nutrients to build up in the lake stimulating weed growth. Restoration work has focussed on inshore removal of weed and ooze; foreshore reclamation and reinstatement; pollutant traps; and channel dredging to increase the tidal exchange of water with the sea.

Wyrrabalong National Park borders the lake and the sea separating the residential areas of Toukley and The Entrance, and preserves the last significant littoral rainforest on the Central Coast. The lake is part of the Tuggerah Important Bird Area, identified as such by BirdLife International because of its importance for a variety of water and woodland birds.

== See also ==
- List of lakes of Australia
