= The Entrance, New South Wales =

The Entrance
- Town
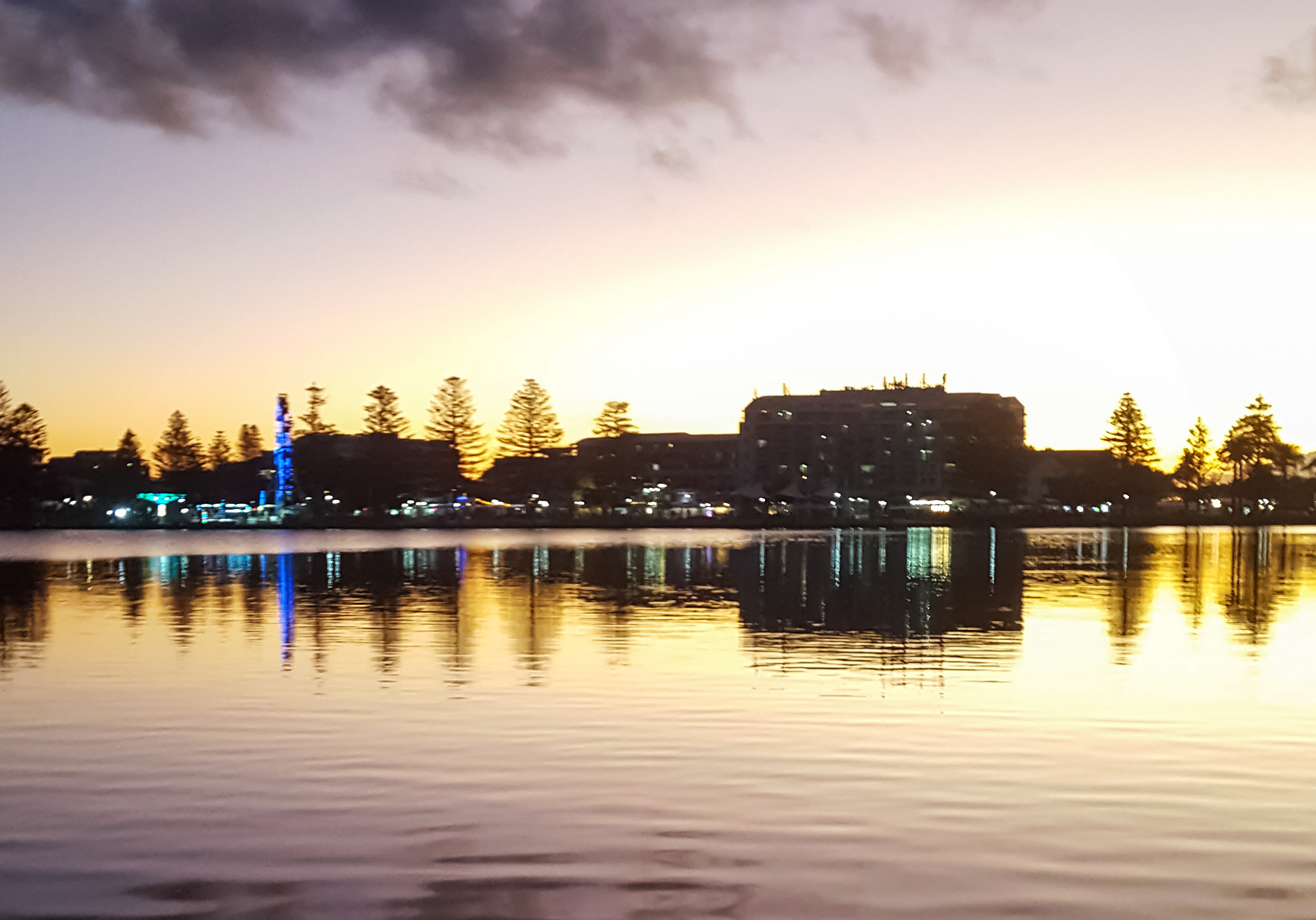
- The Entrance at sunset

- Coordinates: 33°20′50″S 151°29′46″E
- Country: Australia
- State: New South Wales
- City: Central Coast
- LGA: Central Coast Council
- Location: 107 km (66 mi) NNE of Sydney; 16 km (9.9 mi) SE of Wyong; 23 km (14 mi) NE of Gosford; 65 km (40 mi) SSW of Newcastle

Government
  - State electorate: The Entrance
  - Federal division: Dobell

Area
  - Total: 1.4 km^{2} (0.54 sq mi)
- Elevation: 4 m (13 ft)

Population
  - Total: 4,244 (SAL 2021)
- Postcode: 2261
- Parish: Tuggerah
Localities around The Entrance
Tuggerah Lake	The Entrance North	The Entrance North
Tuggerah Lake	The Entrance	Pacific Ocean
Long Jetty	Long Jetty	Blue Bay

The Entrance is a coastal town in the Central Coast region of New South Wales, Australia. It is part of the Central Coast Council local government area. At the 2021 census, The Entrance had a population of 4,244 people.

The town occupies a promontory bounded by water on three sides. The Entrance gains its name from the channel that runs along much of its northern border that is 'the entrance' to Tuggerah Lakes. The Entrance has been a holiday destination since the first guest house was established there in 1885.

The town has extensive tourist accommodation, with attractions including its beaches, lake and town centre. It is also used as a base for day trips to the Hunter Valley vineyards.

== History ==
=== Settlement ===
It is believed Europeans first discovered The Entrance in 1796. It was found by Governor of Tasmania, Colonel David Collins, who had arrived on the First Fleet during the search for an escaped convict woman, Mary Morgan, who was said to be living with Aboriginal people to the North of the Hawkesbury River.

The area now known as The Entrance was occupied by Henry Holden in 1828. He occupied 640 acres (259 ha) and was bounded by the Pacific Ocean on the eastern side, Tuggerah Lake on the northern and western sides and extended all the way to the current Toowoon Bay Road. Holden named the property Towoon. In 1835 the deeds were issued to John Edye Manning and he sold the land for £200 to Thomas Cade Battley who renamed the property Terilbah. Both Battley and Manning have streets named in their honour at The Entrance.

In 1850, ownership was transferred to the Taylor Family and it was referred to as Tuggerah Beach. The land remained privately owned until about 1900 when it was divided up among the twelve children of Richard Brown Taylor and Norberta Maria Gertrude (née Watkins). The Taylors donated land to the Roman Catholic Church, The Church of England and The Entrance Public School. Many streets in the area are named after them including Taylor Street, Richard Street, Norberta Street and Victoria Street.

On 15 December 1910, Karagi Receiving Office was opened. Karagi, meaning the entrance, was the Aboriginal name for the point on the south bank of the channel at the Pacific Ocean, a name which has since been officially adopted. On 1 June 1911, Karagi Receiving Office was designated a post office. The name Karagi was changed on 15 November 1911 and the name "The Entrance" was adopted.

=== Growth ===
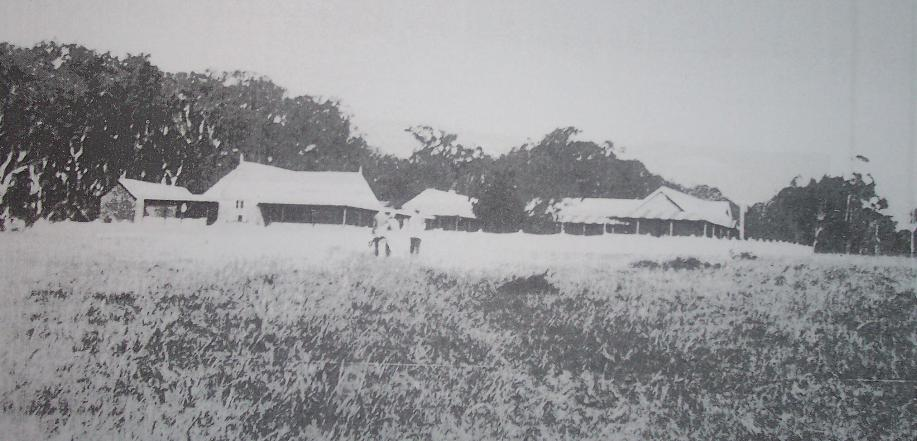
Bayview guest house

In 1889, the railway line was completed from Sydney to Newcastle and tourism began to develop in the area during the late 19th century following the construction of several guest houses. The first guest house in the area was built at The Entrance North by Mr and Mrs Walter Denniss in 1885 and was called Dunleith Guest House. Bayview Guest House was the first to be opened in the Entrance and was opened in 1900 by Mr and Mrs Dening (née Taylor). Pinehurst Guest House was another that was constructed in 1903 by Les Taylor and was by far the largest at that time. By 1912, members of the Taylor family were operating four guest houses at The Entrance.

In March 1920, 200 parcels of land were auctioned after it had become clear that the land in the township needed to be subdivided. Each block of land averaged a selling price of £60 to £80, although some blocks closer to the water sold for as much as £200. Immediately holiday houses began to be built rapidly. It also resulted in a total of 15 guest houses operating soon after, including Lakeside built by Rene Johnson (née Taylor) that was the most exclusive (the building has since relocated to Wyee). Although competition was fierce, the guesthouses had high occupancy rates in the booming times. Bayview Avenue, Ozone Street, and Lakeside Parade are named after guest houses that were located at The Entrance.

Despite the growth, the area was still isolated and access was restricted to a wagon on the bush track from Gosford or by a ferry from Wyong. The area was popular among fishermen and prior to 1908 the majority of boats that travelled to The Entrance used Tuggerah Jetty, the remains of which, still exists on the shore of Tuggerah Lake between the entrances to Wyong River and Ourimbah Creek. When Wyong River was dredged in 1908, the boats would take their catch into Wyong.

Prime Minister Robert Menzies, Mrs Menzies, and their daughter Miss. H. Menzies visited the town in October 1953. The Prime Minister spoke with the pupils at The Entrance Public School and spent the evening at the Floral Ball held at The Palm Grove Dance Hall. It was reported in The Gosford Times that "It was most probably the most magnificent floral display ever assembled ...in this district".

There was a proposal for the railway to have a branch line to The Entrance. The proposed route would have left the Main North line just south of Chittaway Creek and terminated at present day Taylor Park. There was also a proposal for a local government area to be named and centred on The Entrance. Prior to 2016, The Entrance was part of the former Wyong Shire.

== Transport ==
The construction of Wyong Wharf allowed greater access to The Entrance and the demand for ferry transport boomed. Numerous operators took advantage of the demand and ferries such as Wyong, Waiwera, Loongana and Maheno were making regular journeys across Tuggerah Lake. In 1922, the bush track to Wyong was opened as a road. By the end of the 1920s the ferries were rendered obsolete by buses that could reach The Entrance quickly and cheaply.

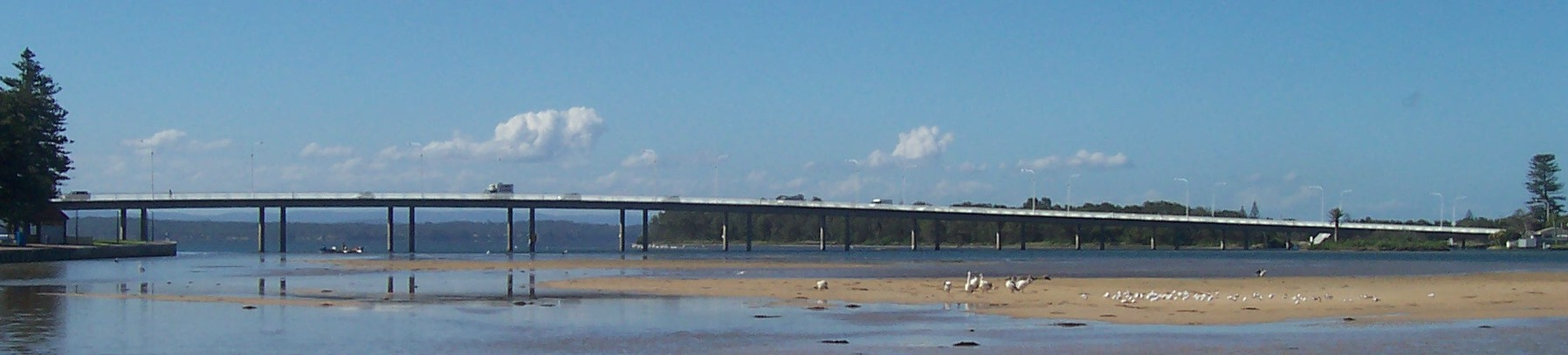
Panoramic view of The Entrance Bridge

The Entrance Bridge links The Entrance with The Entrance North over The Entrance Channel as part of Wilfred Barrett Drive. It was originally a wooden single lane bridge with bypass bays and a traffic light that allowed traffic travelling in the opposite direction to pass. It was opened in 1934. The original bridge was adequate until 1965 as it only served traffic travelling as far as The Entrance North.

By the end of 1965 the traffic flow over the old bridge at The Entrance increased to such an extent the structure was under constant repair. Work began on the current two lane, concrete structure on 17 July 1967 after a successful tender by Transbridge. The bridge was opened to traffic on 20 December 1968 and officially opened by the Premier of New South Wales Robert Askin on 18 April 1969.

The Entrance is serviced by Red Bus CDC NSW, and the town is the major terminus, with several routes terminating and beginning in Torrens Avenue. Generally, Red Bus Services run every 30 to 60 minutes from 5am to 12am. The depot for The Red Bus CDC NSW was on the corner of Denning Street and Blue Bay Road until the early 1980s, the site became the "St. Tropez" building.

== Culture ==
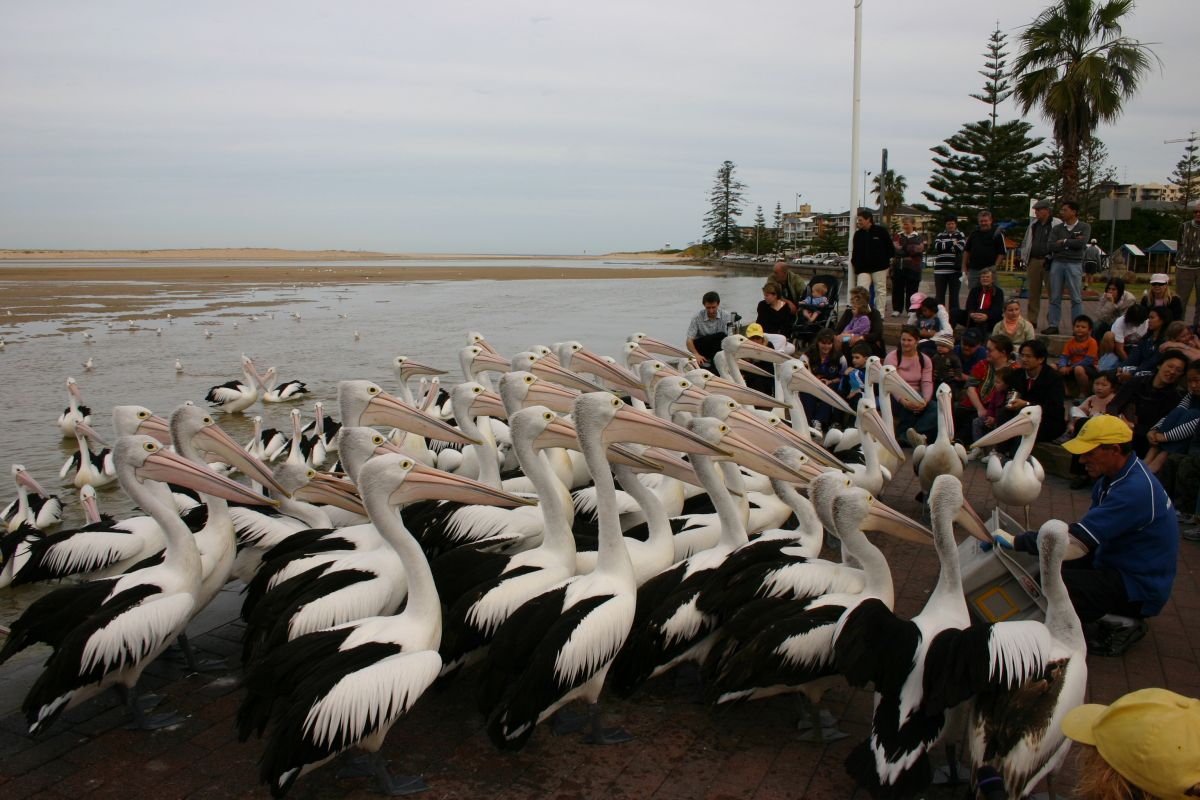
Pelican feeding at The Entrance

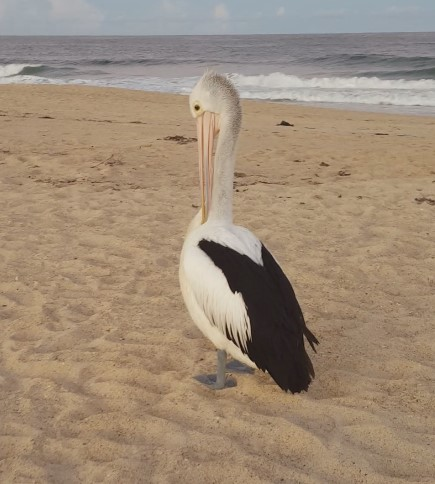
A large pelican at The Entrance.

The Entrance Cinema is located on the corner of The Entrance Road and Bayview Mall. The cinema was opened as The Prince Edward Theatre in 1934 and was immediately popular due to the fire that burnt the other cinema in The Entrance, the Wintergarden Theatre in the same year. The Prince Edward Theatre closed in 1977 but was reopened in 1981 when it was purchased and converted into a smaller cinema. A second screen was added in 1988. The cinema was subject to news coverage in 2006 when it refused to screen the film, The Da Vinci Code as it was contrary to the owner's beliefs.

There is a history walk along the main street and the ocean front boardwalk. This identifies with both text and photos important historic sites in the town.

In 1999, The Entrance waterfront was named 'The Pelican Capital of Australia' by Wyong Shire Council to coincide with the opening of a pelican feeding platform as part of the waterfront redevelopment. The daily practice attracts 20,000 visitors annually. The Entrance is also visited by anglers. The species of fish that can be found in the area include whiting, flathead, bream, and blackfish.

== Demographics ==
As of the 2021 census, The Entrance had a population of 15,839. The majority of residents (78.5%) were born in Australia, with the next most common countries of birth being England (3.0%) and New Zealand (1.6%).

The most common ancestries were English (40.5%), Australian (38.7%), and Irish (13.2%). English was the primary language spoken at home by 85.9% of the population, while other languages included Spanish (0.7%), Punjabi (0.6%), and Mandarin (0.5%).

The most common religious affiliations were No Religion (34.0%), Catholic (26.3%), and Anglican (17.2%), with Christianity overall representing 58.9% of the population. Additionally, 5.5% of the population identified as Aboriginal and/or Torres Strait Islander.

== Notable people ==
- Arthur Chipperfield – test cricketer 1930s, member of The Entrance Cricket Club
- Max Dupain – photographer regularly holidayed at The Entrance, images taken during these stays are held by the Art Gallery of NSW and National Gallery of Victoria
- Natalie Imbruglia – singer and actress, attended Our Lady of the Rosary School, The Entrance
- Craig McLachlan – singer-songwriter and actor, attended The Entrance Public School

== Commercial area ==
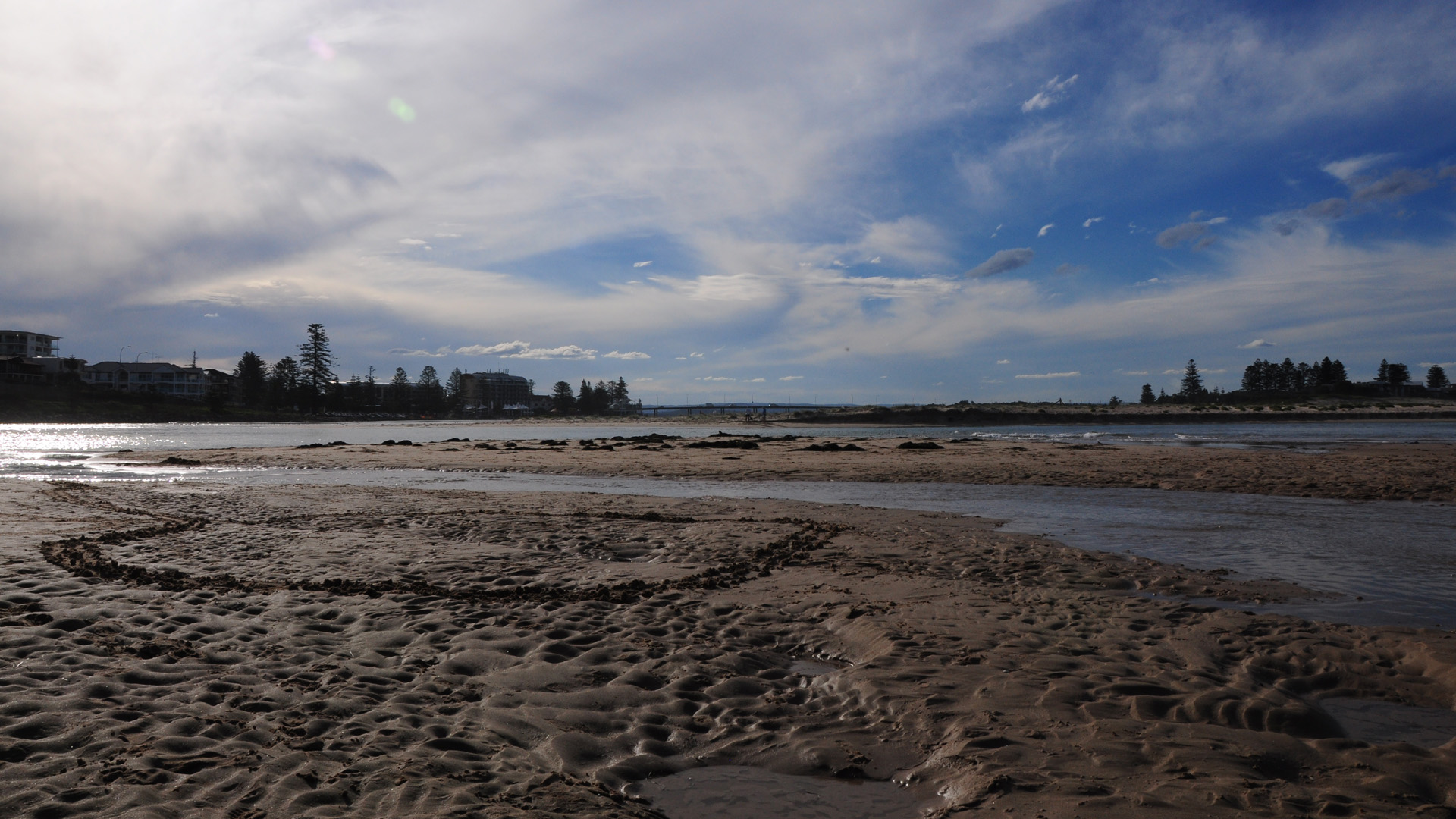
A beach in The Entrance.

The town centre is located predominately along The Entrance Road, extending from Dening Street (named after the original owners of Bayview Guest House.) to The Entrance Bridge. Lakeside Shopping Centre containing a Coles supermarket and speciality stores, is located on the corner of The Entrance Road and Dening Street. The main street of the town (The Entrance Road) has approximately 200 shops, banks and services. Most stores are independent retailers, with only a small number of chain stores in the town.

There is an increasing number of specialist food stores including bakeries, patisserie, two confectionery stores, one of the few specialist Asian supermarkets on the Central Coast, and three bottle shops. Markets are held each week. Legal, medical, the library, Australia Post and political offices are also located within the town. Medicare is co-located with Centrelink in Torrens Avenue. At the northern end of the main street the stores focus on the needs of tourists with fashion, cafes, and restaurants. The Golden Gate Cafe in the town is a "classic" Australian milk bar, having opened to serve patrons to the Prince Edward Cinema. It features booth seating, mirror displays, sweet and lolly counters.

The Entrance has two hotels, both located on The Entrance Road, these being the newer "The Lakes", opened in the 1940s, and the original "The Entrance Hotel" opened in the 1920s. Both contain original architectural features.

== Mardi Gras ==
To celebrate the start of the summer tourist season, held traditionally on the first full weekend in December, The Entrance holds its annual Mardi Gras festival. The first Mardi Gras was held in 1950, and as such is one of the oldest town festivals in NSW. Mardi Gras is a major event of the town and district for the year. The festival is named Mardi Gras after the spirit of the carnivals and Mardi Gras of Europe. The event contains a number of events including fun runs, concerts, fireworks and displays. The highlight is the parade. This contains numerous floats from local commercial, sporting, and community organizations.

Due to a lack of funds Mardi Gras was not held in 2013. Mardi Gras returned in 2014 with some 75 groups participating and an attendance in excess of 12,500 people. In 2015 Mardi Gras was held on the last weekend in November.

== Clubs, sport, and leisure facilities ==
The Entrance has a selection of sporting facilities. These include The Entrance Ocean Baths – a three pool salt water complex with free access all year around. Taylor Park is the main playing field in the town hosting cricket matches. The Entrance beach has one of the oldest surf clubs in the region, housed in an art deco building overlooking the beach. The Entrance Skate Park at Picnic Point allows free access to a purpose built skate board area. The Entrance Cycle & Walking track, is a concrete path starting in at Picnic Point allowing for off-road cycling alongside the lake. Fishing and boat ramp facilities are located at Picnic Point. The Entrance Memorial Park, within the town, features a band stand with views across the channel and lake.

1st Tuggerah Lakes Scout Group is the local Scout Troop. Established in 1932, they have a large, modern, group headquarters located in Baden-Powell reserve.

The Entrance District Cricket Club was founded in 1912. The has development of juniors, which commenced in the 1970s, the coaching programs and the ability of the club to have a mix of youth and experience on the playing field, have combined to see the club take out premierships throughout the grades as well as being Club Champions on a number of occasions.

== Church services ==
Churches in the town provide services to Catholic (Our Lady of the Rosary), Anglican (All Saints), Uniting, and Presbyterian (St. Andrew's) faiths.

== Education ==
Within The Entrance town there is a one state public primary school, The Entrance Public School. It is a K–6 school, having been established in November 1915 with an enrolment of 10 students. Previously a split site school, with the infants located on Oakland Avenue, it was amalgamated into a single site with new buildings in the early 2000s. The school covers the district from North Entrance to Shelly Beach. The school includes students who would have previously been educated at The Entrance North Public School, which was closed in 1989 due to low enrollments.

Glenvale Special School is located at The Entrance North, on the former grounds of The Entrance North Public School. It is a dual campus school, with a main campus at Narara near Gosford.

The Entrance High School was opened in 1970 and is located at Shelly Beach. It has since become the senior campus for Tuggerah Lakes Secondary College.

Our Lady of the Rosary Catholic School was located within the church grounds from 1952 until the 1990s. The school was a split site school from the 1970s when the infants school, "The Little School", was located on Shelly Beach road. The sites switched in 1987 with the primary school moving to Shelly Beach and the little school moving to the church grounds at The Entrance. The school is now located K–6 at Shelly Beach as a function of The Entrance Parish.

St. Peter's Catholic College is the parish secondary 7–12 school for Our Lady of the Rosary. It is located in Tuggerah.

== Heritage listings ==
The Entrance has a number of heritage-listed sites, including:

- Ocean Parade: The Entrance Ocean Pools
