= Delta Electricity =

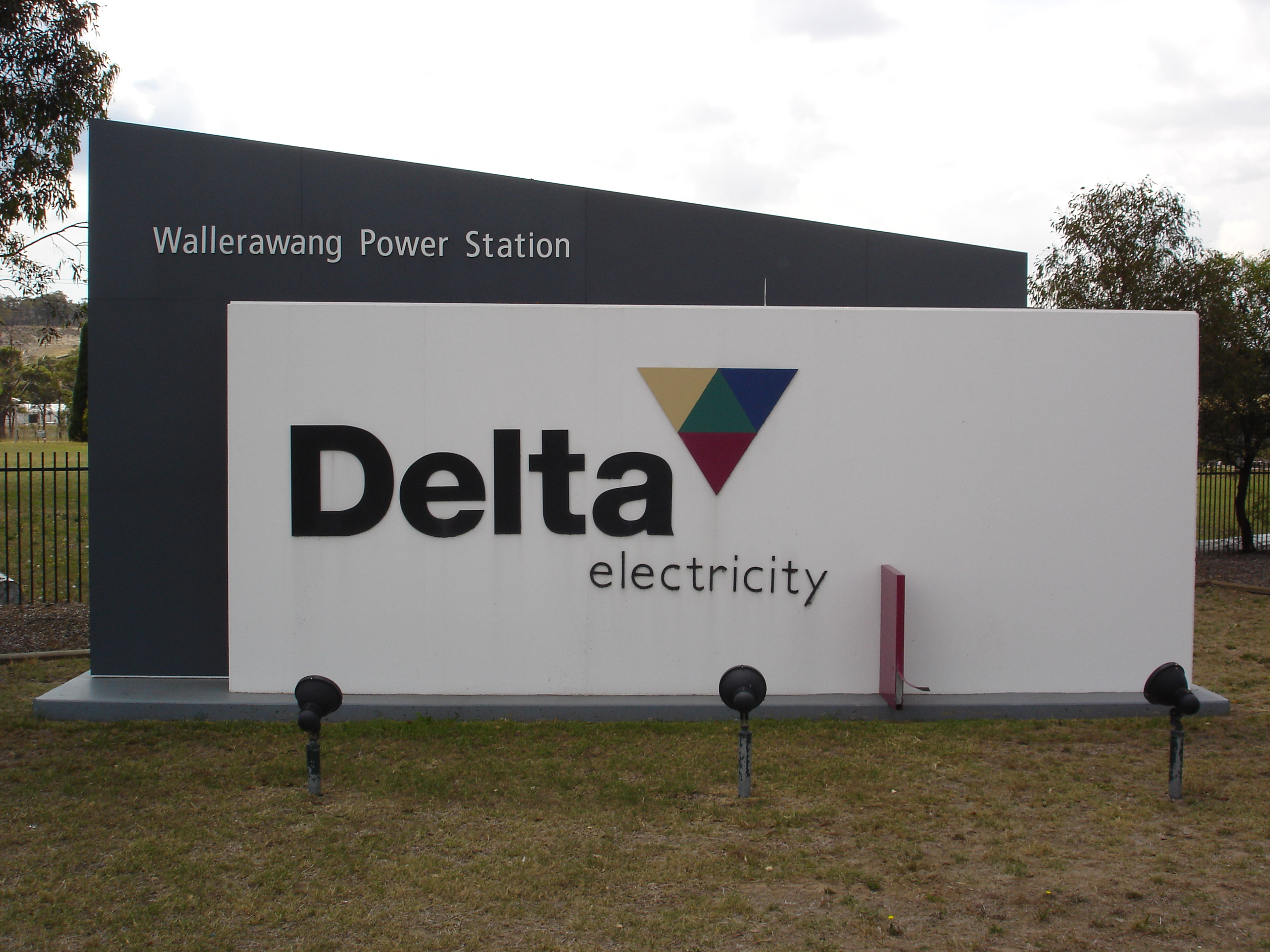
- Type: Private Corporation
- Industry: Electricity generation
- Founded: 1996
- Headquarters: Sydney, Australia
- Key people: Trevor St Baker (Director); Brian Flannery (Director); Greg Everett (MD)
- Owner: Sunset Power International
- Number of employees: ▼280
- Parent: Sunset Power International
- Website: www.de.com.au

Delta Electricity is an electricity generation company in Australia. The company was formed by the Government of New South Wales in 1996 as part of its reform of the electricity sector in the State, which saw the breakup of the Electricity Commission of New South Wales. Delta Electricity, which at the time owned only the Vales Point Power Station, was sold to Sunset Power International for $1 million in November 2015 and was valued at $730 million 2 years later. It has a portfolio of generating sites mainly using thermal coal power.

== Generation portfolio ==
Delta Electricity, as a State-owned corporation has owned and operated the following power stations to generate electricity for sale under contract. Since December 2015, Delta Electricity only operates the Vales Point Power Station.

Name	Fuel	Type	Location	Maximum capacity	Commissioned	Reference(s)
Broadwater	Biomass			38 megawatts (51,000 hp)		Sold to Cape Byron Power, November 2013
Chichester Dam	Hydroelectricity	Conventional	near Dungog	110 kilowatts (150 hp)	2001	
Colongra	Gas	Gas turbines	Colongra	667 megawatts (894,000 hp)	2009	Sold to Snowy Hydro, Jan 2015
Condong	Biomass			30 megawatts (40,000 hp)		Sold to Cape Byron Power, November 2013
Dungog	Hydroelectricity		Dungog	110 kilowatts (150 hp)		
Munmorah – decommissioned	Coal	Steam turbines	Lake Munmorah	600 megawatts (800,000 hp)	1967 / 69	Retained by NSW Government/Generator Property Management
Vales Point	Coal	Steam turbines	Mannering Park	1,320 megawatts (1,770,000 hp)	1963 / 64, 1978	

== History ==
Delta Electricity was formed by the Government of New South Wales in 1996 as part of its reform of the electricity sector in the State, which saw the breakup of the Electricity Commission of New South Wales.

Following a report by the Health Rivers Commission, in 1998 the Minister for Urban Affairs and Planning, Craig Knowles, announced that a small hydro-electric power station would be installed in the Chichester Dam to generate electricity, reduce greenhouse emissions and allow surplus power to be sold back to the State grid. The mini-power station was completed in 2001 and operated by Delta Electricity, and generates up to 110 kW (150 hp) of electricity at times of peak flow; with an average annual generation of 0.4 GWh (1.4 TJ).

As the Keneally Labor government moved to privatise components of the electricity industry in New South Wales including the electricity trading rights of Delta Electricity, on 14 December 2010 four of the five directors of Delta (including the chairman) suddenly stood down in protest over the proposed sale. On 28 February 2011, at the direction of the New South Wales Government, the newly constituted Board of Delta entered into contracts with energy retailer, TRUenergy, for the supply of electricity under Generation Trading Agreements from the Wallerawang and Mount Piper Power Stations. A subsequent NSW Parliamentary Inquiry was held, but the directors of Delta who resigned refused to give evidence before the Inquiry unless guarantees of parliamentary privilege would be given by the Government. Keneally refused to provides guarantees and, according to the Inquiry chairman, the Government stymied the Inquiry's ability to uncover the facts as to the resignation of the directors.

In May 2012, the New South Wales Parliament passed legislation to sell the State-owned generators. In July 2013, EnergyAustralia acquired from Delta Electricity Wallerawang and Mount Piper Power Stations, near Lithgow, New South Wales, for A$160 million. In November 2014, EnergyAustralia announced that it would permanently close Wallerawang due to ongoing reduced energy demand, lack of access to competitively priced coal and the power station's high operating costs. EnergyAustralia began the process of removing useful equipment from the station in 2015 and began demolition of the site when this process has been completed.

In early 2015, the Colongra Power Station at Lake Munmorah was sold to Snowy Hydro. In November 2015, Delta Electricity, which at the time owned only the Vales Point Power Station, was sold to Sunset Power International for $1 million. Delta Electricity was dissolved in October 2016. The NSW Government retained ownership of the decommissioned Munmorah Power Station (Generation Property Management) which is being demolished.
