= Kanwal, New South Wales =

Coordinates: 33°15′54″S 151°29′06″E

Kanwal
- Suburb
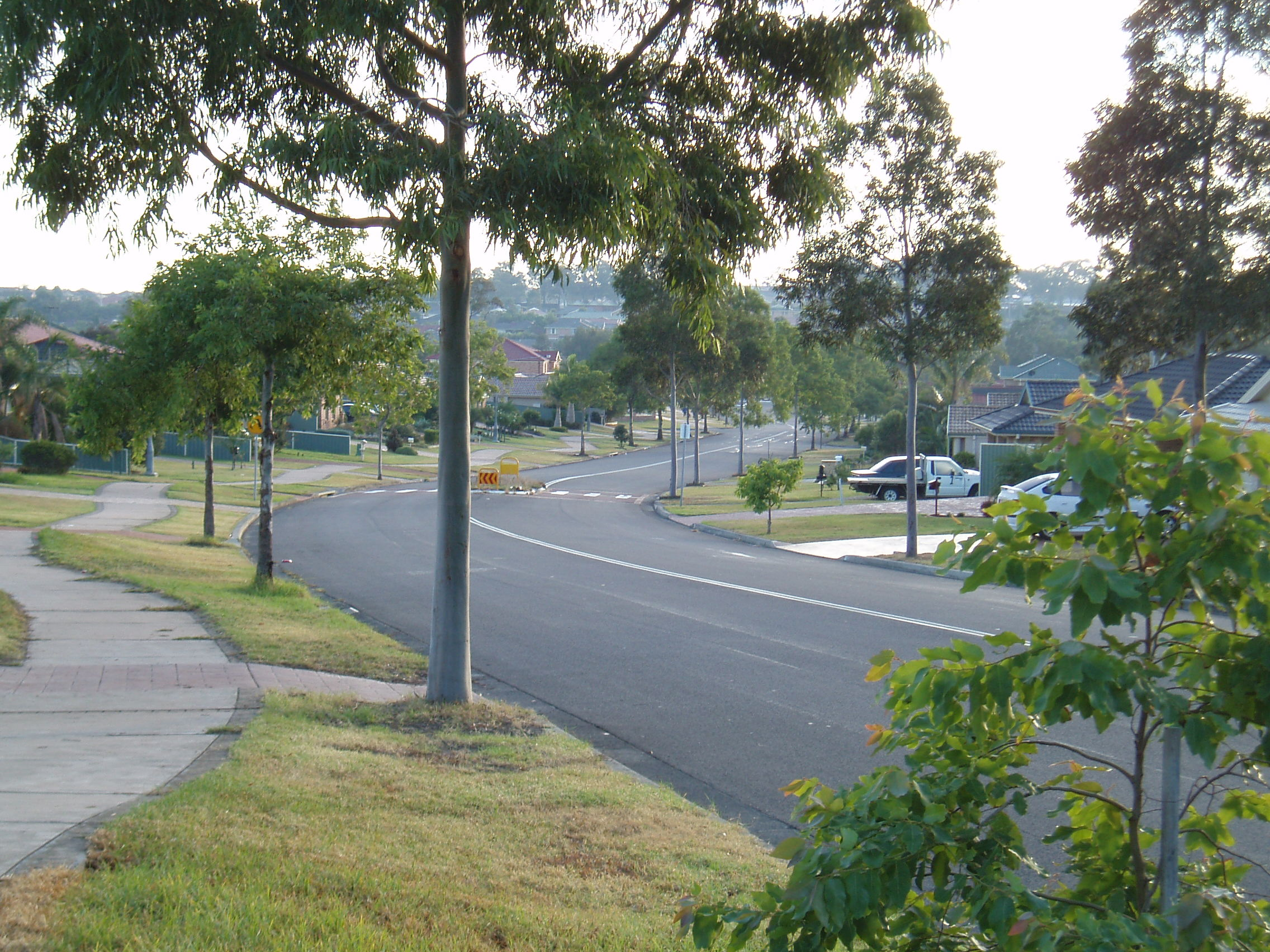
- Interactive map of Kanwal
- Country: Australia
- State: New South Wales
- City: Central Coast
- LGA: Central Coast Council
- Location: 18 km (11 mi) N of The Entrance; 9 km (5.6 mi) NE of Wyong; 55 km (34 mi) SW of Newcastle; 35 km (22 mi) NNE of Gosford; 105 km (65 mi) NNE of Sydney

Government
  - State electorate: Wyong
  - Federal division: Dobell

Area
  - Total: 2 km^{2} (0.77 sq mi)
- Elevation: 21 m (69 ft)

Population
  - Total: 4,194 (2021 census)
  - Density: 2,100/km^{2} (5,400/sq mi)
- Postcode: 2259
- Parish: Munmorah
Suburbs around Kanwal
Woongarrah	Charmhaven	Lake Haven
Hamlyn Terrace	Kanwal	Gorokan
Wadalba	Wyongah	Tuggerah Lake

Kanwal is a suburb just west of the Tuggerah Lake on the Central Coast, New South Wales, Australia. It is part of the Central Coast Council local government area and is approximately nine kilometres north east of Wyong and six kilometres west of the Pacific Ocean.

== History ==
The area now known as Kanwal was a subdivision of Warnervale. Kanwal is said to mean "spotting snakes indeed" in a local Aboriginal language.

== Landmarks ==
The dominating feature of Kanwal is the Wyong Rugby League Club to the northeast of the suburb. It is home to the Wyong Roos, a rugby league football club, three sporting ovals, two netball courts and a youth and community centre. There are several parks in Kanwal including Craigie Park to the east facing onto Tuggerah Lake, a wetland area to the northwest and another sporting oval to the south separate from the Rugby League club.

Tuggerah Lakes Private Hospital, a 20-bed private hospital, was constructed in 2019, opposite Wyong Hospital which is in Hamlyn Terrace. It is expected to close in 2023.

Other landmarks in the area include a small shopping village, a primary school, three aged care facilities, four buildings of religious worship and a caravan park.

== Transport ==
The area is serviced by four regular Busways bus routes, operating between Lake Haven Shopping Centre and Wyong railway station or Westfield Tuggerah. All four routes split up in different directions at Kanwal, two servicing the northern and western areas and the other two servicing eastern and southern areas together.

The Main Northern railway line passes close by at Warnervale with Warnervale railway station four kilometres to the west of Kanwal and one of the bus routes mentioned passes it several times a day. However, Wyong railway station also lies approximately six kilometres to the southwest, is serviced by all four bus routes frequently and has more train services operating from it, including the NSW TrainLink service.
