= Doyalson North =

Doyalson North Central Coast, New South Wales
- Coordinates: 33°11′13″S 151°32′35″E
- Population: 403 (2011 census)
- Postcode(s): 2262
- Elevation: 29 m (95 ft)
- Location: 24 km (15 mi) N of The Entrance; 21 km (13 mi) NE of Wyong; 45 km (28 mi) SW of Newcastle; 40 km (25 mi) NNE of Gosford; 110 km (68 mi) NNE of Sydney
- LGA(s): Central Coast Council
- Parish: Wallarah
- State electorate(s): Swansea
- Federal division(s): Shortland
Suburbs around Doyalson North:
Mannering Park	Mannering Park	Chain Valley Bay
Wyee	Doyalson North	Lake Munmorah
Doyalson	Colongra	Lake Munmorah

Doyalson North is a suburb of the Central Coast region of New South Wales, Australia. It is part of the Central Coast Council local government area.
