= Wyee railway station =

Railway station in New South Wales, Australia

Wyee
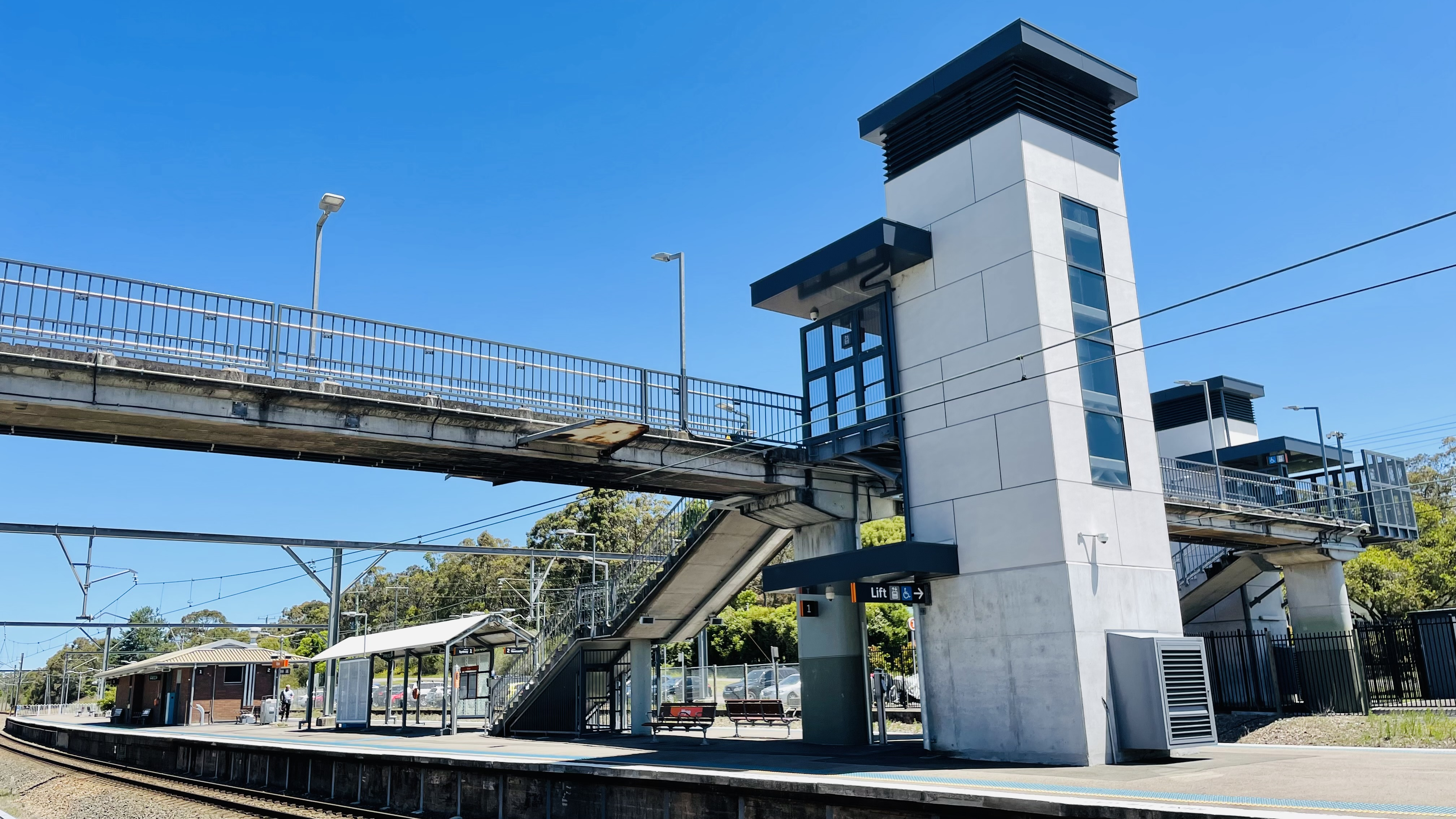
- Southbound view of Platform 2, concourse and footbridge, November 2022

General information
- Location: Gorokan Road, Wyee; Australia
- Coordinates: 33°10′50″S 151°29′14″E
- Owner: Transport Asset Manager of New South Wales
- Operator: Sydney Trains
- Line: Main Northern
- Distance: 114.86 km (71.37 mi) from Central
- Platforms: 2 (1 island)
- Tracks: 2
- Connections: Bus

Construction
- Structure type: Ground
- Accessible: Yes

Other information
- Status: Weekdays: Staffed: 5.35am to 5.05pm: Weekends and public holidays: Unstaffed
- Station code: WYE
- Website: Transport for NSW

History
- Opened: 1 August 1892; 134 years ago

Passengers
- 2025: 125,216 (year); 343 (daily) (Sydney Trains, NSW TrainLink)

Services
Preceding station	Intercity Trains	Following station
Morisset towards Newcastle Interchange	Central Coast & Newcastle Line	Warnervale towards Central
Morisset towards Newcastle Interchange	Central Coast & Newcastle Line Weekend express	Wyong towards Central
Location

Wyee railway station is located on the Main Northern line in New South Wales, Australia. It serves the City of Lake Macquarie town of Wyee opening on 1 August 1892.

Until the early 2000s, two sidings were located to the west of the station to serve a cement works just north of the station. Another siding was located to the east of the station. All have been removed.

In August 2020 an upgrade was complete which included three new lifts.

== Platforms and services ==
Wyee has one island platform with two faces. It is serviced by Sydney Trains Intercity Central Coast & Newcastle Line services travelling between Sydney Central, Gosford and Newcastle.

Platform	Line	Stopping pattern	Notes
1	CCN	Services to Gosford & Sydney Central	
2	CCN	Services to Newcastle	

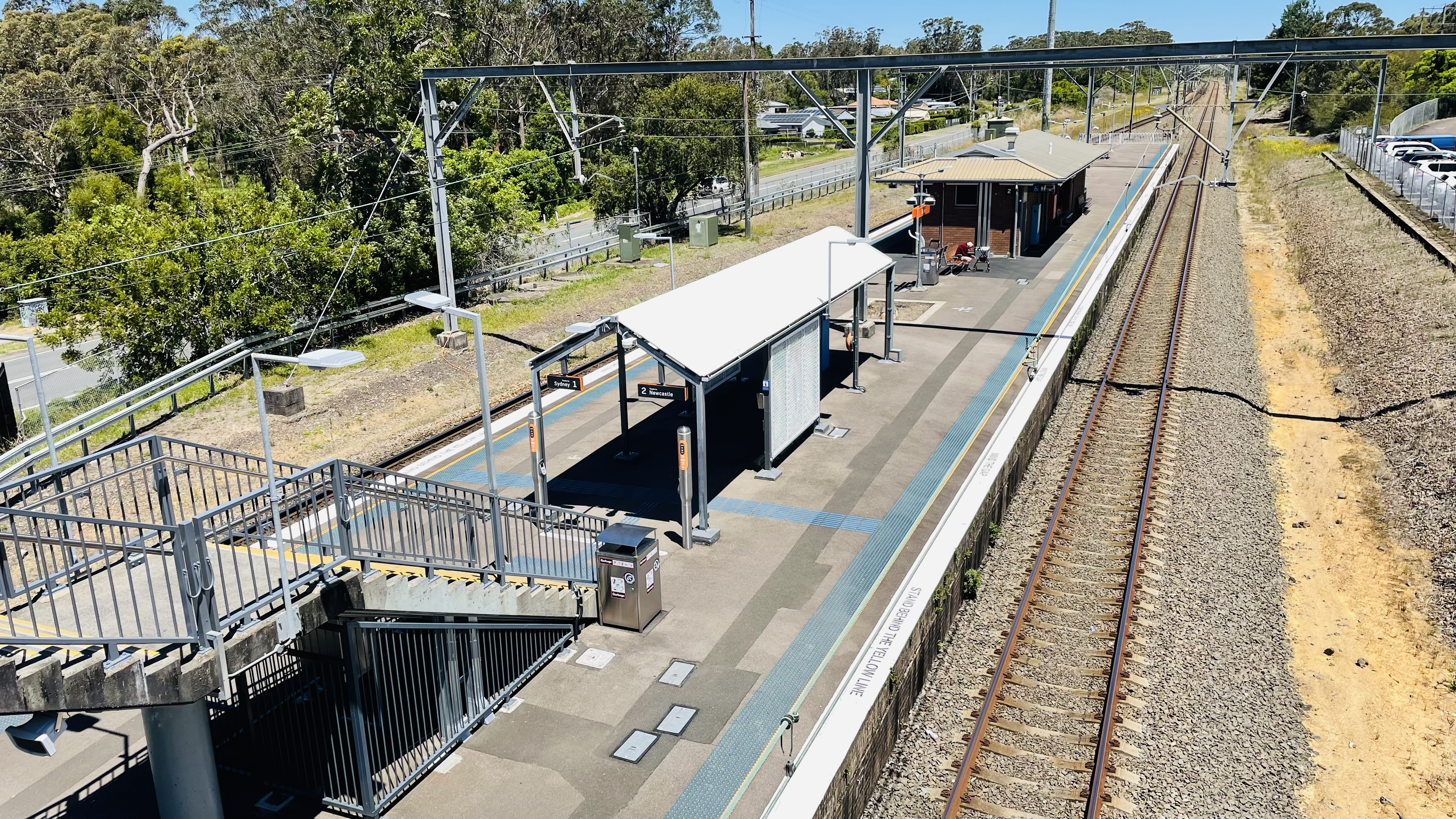
Looking south from footbridge

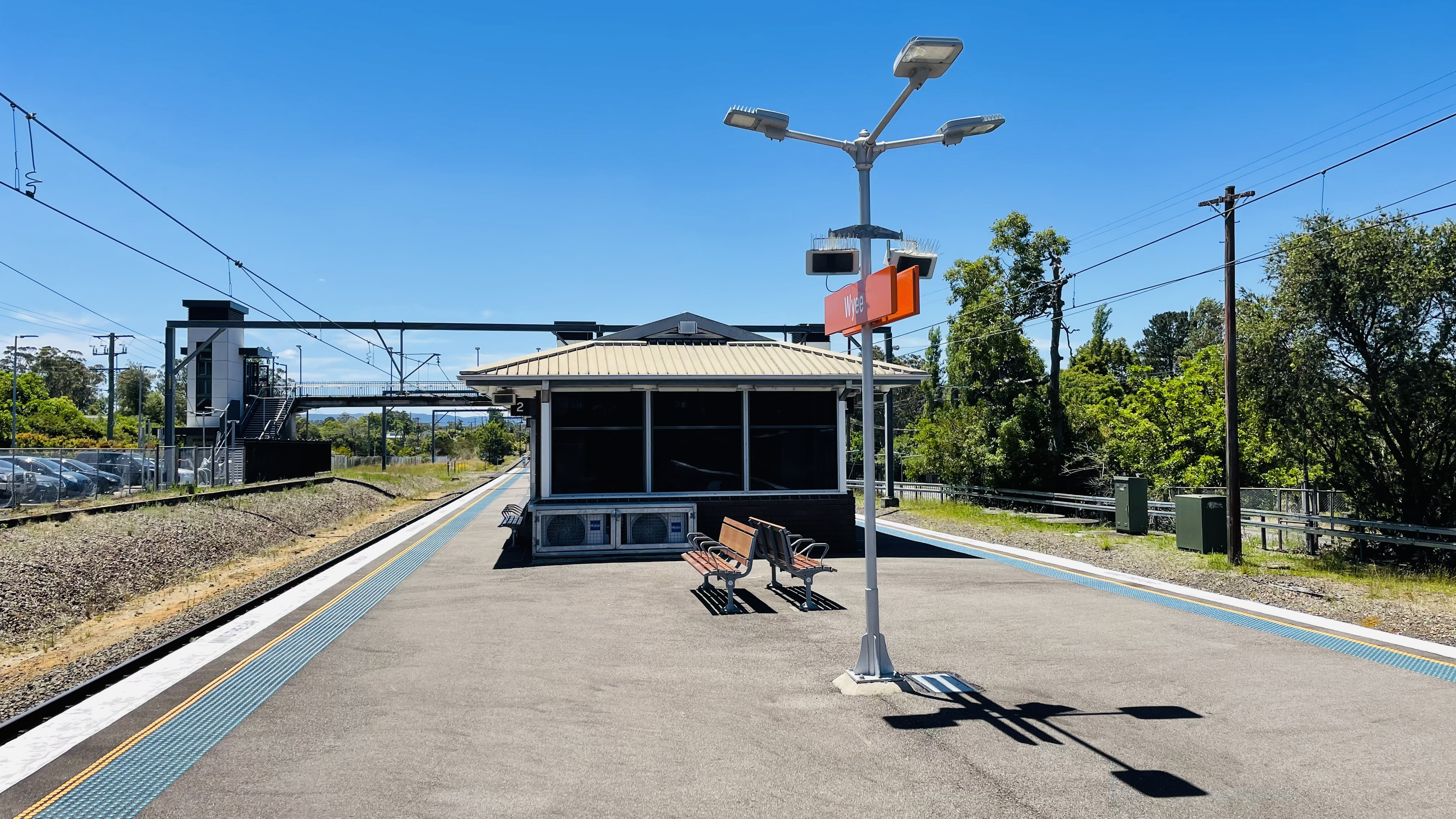
Northbound view on the island platform

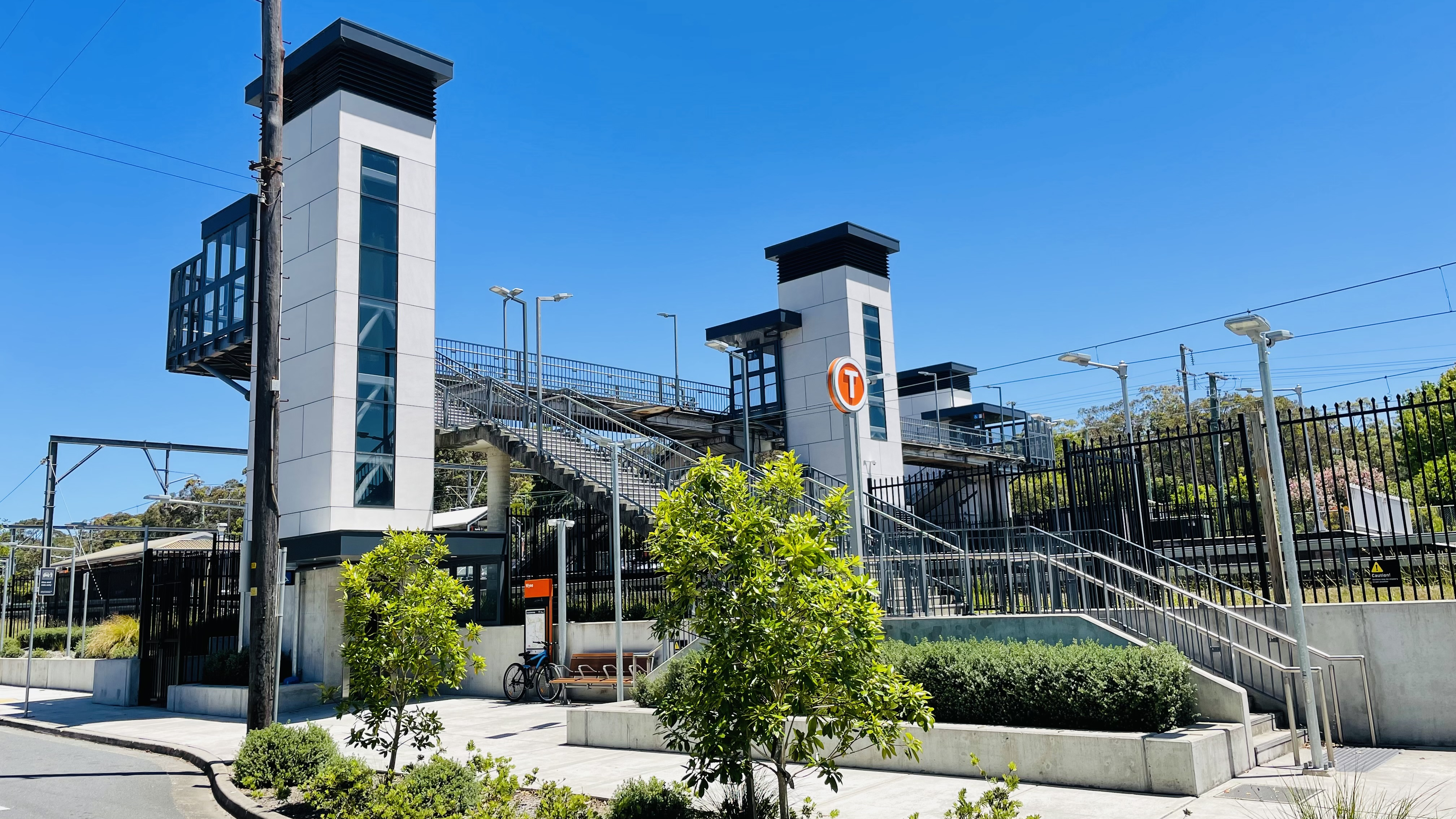
Entrance on Wyee Road

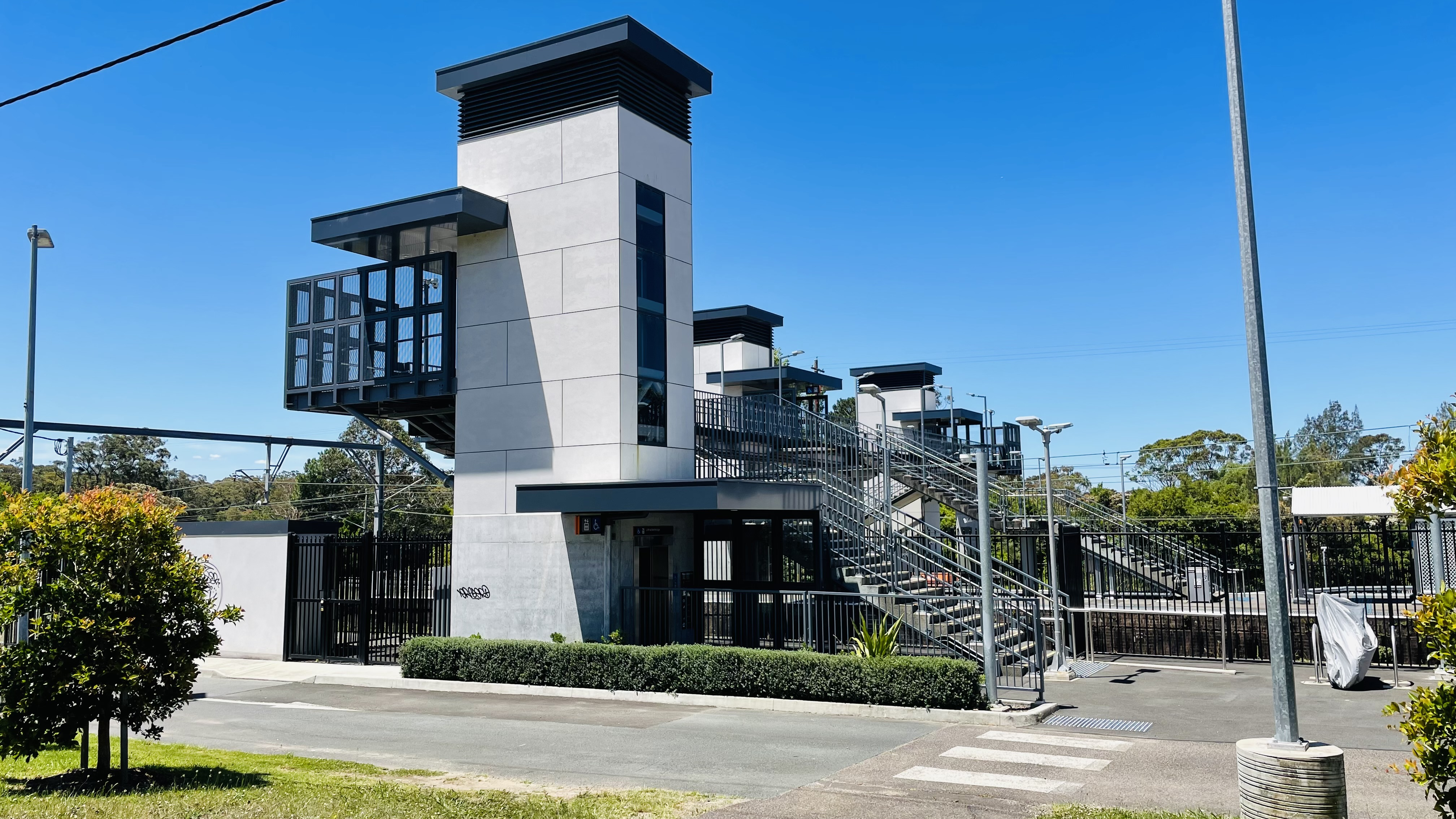
Entrance on Gorokan Road

== Transport links ==
Busways operates three bus routes via Wyee station, under contract to Transport for NSW:

- 95X: to Lake Haven
- 96: to Budgewoi
- 97: Lake Haven to Mannering Park

Coastal Liner operates two bus routes via Wyee station, under contract to Transport for NSW:

- 10: Westfield Tuggerah to Warnervale
- 281: Lake Haven to Wangi Wangi
