= San Remo, New South Wales =

Coordinates: 33°12′51″S 151°31′18″E

San Remo
- Suburb
- Interactive map of San Remo
- Country: Australia
- State: New South Wales
- City: Central Coast
- LGA: Central Coast Council
- Location: 22 km (14 mi) N of The Entrance; 17 km (11 mi) NE of Wyong; 51 km (32 mi) SW of Newcastle; 37 km (23 mi) NNE of Gosford; 107 km (66 mi) NNE of Sydney

Government
  - State electorate: Swansea
  - Federal division: Shortland

Area
  - Total: 2.4 km^{2} (0.93 sq mi)
- Elevation: 13 m (43 ft)

Population
  - Total: 4,434 (SAL 2021)
- Postcode: 2262
- Parish: Munmorah
Suburbs around San Remo
Doyalson	Doyalson	Colongra
Blue Haven	San Remo	Colongra
Charmhaven	Budgewoi Lake	Buff Point

San Remo is a suburb of the Central Coast region of New South Wales, Australia. It is part of the Central Coast Council local government area, and is 90 minutes from Sydney. It is home to Northlakes High School, which has over 1000 students, and the San Remo Neighbourhood Centre.
