= Blue Haven, New South Wales =

Blue Haven
- Suburb
- Interactive map of Blue Haven
- Coordinates: 33°12′43″S 151°30′13″E
- Country: Australia
- State: New South Wales
- City: Central Coast
- LGA: Central Coast Council
- Location: 24 km (15 mi) N of The Entrance; 16 km (9.9 mi) NE of Wyong; 51 km (32 mi) SW of Newcastle; 35 km (22 mi) NNE of Gosford; 105 km (65 mi) NNE of Sydney
- Established: 1991

Government
  - State electorate: Wyong
  - Federal division: Dobell

Area
  - Total: 2.5 km^{2} (0.97 sq mi)
- Elevation: 8 m (26 ft)

Population
  - Total: 6,378 (2016 census)
  - Density: 2,550/km^{2} (6,610/sq mi)
- Postcode: 2262
Suburbs around Blue Haven
Wyee		Doyalson
Bushells Ridge	Blue Haven	San Remo
	Charmhaven

Blue Haven is a suburb on the Central Coast of New South Wales, Australia, located on Pacific Highway at Wallarah Creek. Its local government area is Central Coast Council.

The suburb has an Aldi Supermarket and Medical Centre.

== History ==
Blue Haven was once made up of several dirt roads (the main road being 'Roper Road', the only way in or out of Blue Haven at the time) and surrounded by bushland. It now has more than 80 streets and 3 different main entries and exits. The wetland areas are now preserved areas. Blue Haven, in the past, would suffer from constant bushfires in the dry season.

=== Pre-1991 ===
Before it was named Blue Haven, the suburb was known as Blueridge Estate – and depending on where mail was sent, the northern area was Doyalson and the southern area was Charmhaven.

== Population ==
According to the 2016 census of Population, there were 6,378 people in Blue Haven.

- Aboriginal and Torres Strait Islander people made up 7.4% of the population.
- 84.3% of people were born in Australia. The most common countries of birth were UK 3.1% and New Zealand 1.6%.
- 91.4% of people only spoke English at home.
- The most common responses for religion were No Religion 26.7%, Catholic 26.7% and Anglican 26.4%.

== Geography ==
Blue Haven is bounded by Pacific Highway to the east, the Doyalson Link Road (linking to the Pacific Motorway) to the north, Spring Creek to the west and Wallarah Creek to the south. Spring Creek and Wallarah Creek are connected to Tuggerah Lake, one of Australia's largest coastal saltwater lakes.

== Education ==
Blue Haven contains a state primary school, Blue Haven Public School (No.4623), which commenced in 1999 and, as of 2 September 2008, had over 600 students from kindergarten to year 6, and 33 teaching and administrative staff. The neighbouring suburb of San Remo is home to Northlakes High School, which opened in 1981 and has over 1000 students. In 2019, Blue Haven Public School was awarded ‘Primary school of the year – Government’ at the Australian Education Awards.

== Recreation ==
There are several wetland areas located in the southern parts of the town. Blue Haven also has an Oval, skate park, basketball courts and a community centre located on Apsley Court.

The Community Centre incorporates an After School Care facility and a "Schools as Community Centre" that operates in conjunction with Blue Haven Public School.

There are also several parks and reserves located within the estate, these include:

- Blue Haven Pocket Park – The Circuit
- Blueridge Drive Reserve – Blueridge Drive
- Lady Laurel Drive Reserve – 18 Lady Laurel Drive
- Lawrance Reserve – 36 St Lawrence Avenue
- Miller Crescent Reserve – 10 Marsden Road
- Redgum Hilltop Park – 1 Elkington Drive
- Spring Creek Reserve – Corner Olney Drive and Waterhen Close

== Transport ==
Blue Haven is served by three public transport routes, provided by Busways Wyong and some 98 services operated by Coastal Liner (CDCNSW):

• 96 Wyee Stn to Budgewoi Via Blue Haven, San Remo and Buff Point

- 98 Lake Haven to Blue Haven and Chain Valley Bay.
- 99 Lake Haven to Blue Haven, Gwandalan, Swansea and Charlestown.
