= Tuggerawong =

- Suburb
- Interactive map of Tuggerawong
- Coordinates: 33°16′51″S 151°28′33″E
- Country: Australia
- State: New South Wales
- City: Central Coast
- LGA: Central Coast Council
- Location: 7 km (4.3 mi) E of Wyong

Government
  - State electorate: Wyong
  - Federal division: Dobell

Area
  - Total: 1.5 km^{2} (0.58 sq mi)

Population
  - Total: 1,204 (2011 census)
  - Density: 803/km^{2} (2,080/sq mi)
- Postcode: 2259
- Parish: Munmorah
Suburbs around Tuggerawong
Wadalba	Wadalba	Wyongah
Tacoma	Tuggerawong	Tuggerah Lake
Rocky Point		Tuggerah Lake

Tuggerawong is a lakeside suburb of the Central Coast in New South Wales, Australia. It is located approximately 7 kilometres east of the Wyong town centre. Shopping, commercial facilities, schools and all normal community services are available in the district. In Wyong there is a rail connection and there is a connection to the Pacific Motorway at Tuggerah and Warnervale.

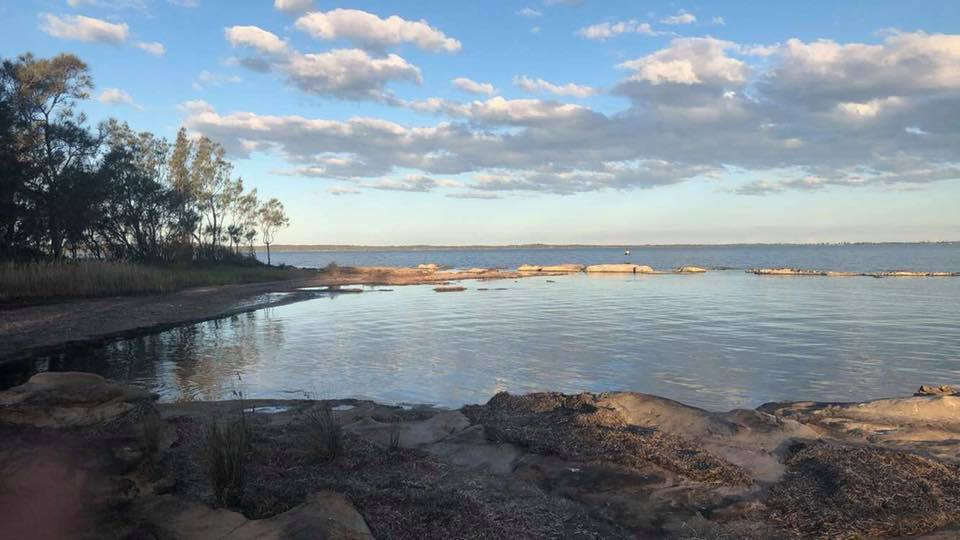
Tuggerah Lake from the west side
