= Woongarrah =

- Suburb
- Interactive map of Woongarrah
- Coordinates: 33°13′55″S 151°28′5″E
- Country: Australia
- State: New South Wales
- City: Central Coast
- LGA: Central Coast Council
- Location: 10 km (6.2 mi) NE of Wyong

Government
  - State electorate: Wyong
  - Federal division: Dobell

Population
  - Total: 5,962 (2021 census)
- Postcode: 2259
- Parish: Munmorah
Suburbs around Woongarrah
Wallarah	Charmhaven	Charmhaven
Wallarah	Woongarrah	Lake Haven
Warnervale	Hamlyn Terrace	Kanwal

Woongarrah is a suburb of the Central Coast region of New South Wales, Australia. It is part of the Central Coast Council local government area, as well as part of the Warnervale development precinct.

Woongarrah was a rural area for much of the 20th century until it began to be urbanised in the late 1990s, much like the neighbouring suburb of Hamlyn Terrace. Housing estates were initially established in the southeast of the suburb, with urbanisation continuing to the west into the 21st century. The northern half of the suburb has not seen development occur and still consists mainly of paddocks and rural properties.

Planning began in 2000 for a commercial development in the area north of Sparks Road and east of the railway, termed Warnervale Town Centre. Woolworths proposed to build a new shopping centre, and a railway station was planned. A road was constructed to the proposed site (Woongarrah Road), but as of 2022, work on the shopping centre has not yet begun. New plans call for a scaled-down shopping centre, and there is no longer a plan to build a railway station.

== Demographics ==
In the 2021 census, Woongarrah recorded a population of 5,962 people, 52.0% female and 48.0% male with 6.0% being Indigenous Australian. The median age of the population was 36 years, 2 years below the national median of 38. 82.0% of people living in Woongarrah were born in Australia. The other top responses for country of birth were England 3.4%, New Zealand 1.5%, India 1.1%, the Philippines 1.0% and Malta 0.6%. 88.5% of people spoke only English at home; the next most common languages were 0.8% Malayalam, 0.5% Korean, 0.4% Spanish, 0.4% Italian and 0.3% Maltese.

In the 2016 census, Woongarrah recorded a population of 5,226 people, 51.8% female and 48.2% male with 4.1% being Indigenous Australian. The median age of the population was 35 years, 3 years below the national median of 38. 81.5% of people living in Woongarrah were born in Australia. The other top responses for country of birth were England 4.2%, New Zealand 1.3%, Philippines 0.8%, Malta 0.6% and Scotland 0.6%. 88.7% of people spoke only English at home; the next most common languages were 0.5% Spanish, 0.5% Maltese, 0.4% Italian, 0.3% Vietnamese and 0.3% Tongan.

In the 2011 census, Woongarrah recorded a population of 4,507 people, 51.8% female and 48.2% male with 2.7% being Indigenous Australian. The median age of the population was 34 years, 3 years below the national median of 37. 79.2% of people living in Woongarrah were born in Australia. The other top responses for country of birth were England 4.5%, New Zealand 1.8%, Scotland 0.9%, Malta 0.6% and the Philippines 0.5%. 88.5% of people spoke only English at home; the next most common languages were 0.6% Maltese, 0.4% Italian, 0.4% German, 0.3% Tongan and 0.3% Spanish.

== Education ==
Woongarrah Public School is a government co-educational primary (Kindergarten-6) school at 63-73 Mataram Road (33.24228°S 151.48481°E). In 2023, the school had an enrolment of 383 students, with 23 teachers (26.4 full-time equivalent) and 5 non-teaching staff (3.8 full-time equivalent). It opened in 2005.

Mackillop Catholic College is an independent Roman Catholic co-educational primary and secondary (Kindergarten-12) school at 91 Sparks Road (33.24130°S 151.46795°E). In 2023, the school had an enrolment of 1,511 students with 127 teachers (114.7 full-time equivalent) and 37 non-teaching staff (24.3 full-time equivalent). It opened in 2003.

== See also ==
- List of Central Coast, New South Wales suburbs
- List of schools in the Hunter and Central Coast
