= Vales Point Power Station =

Coal-fired power station in Australia

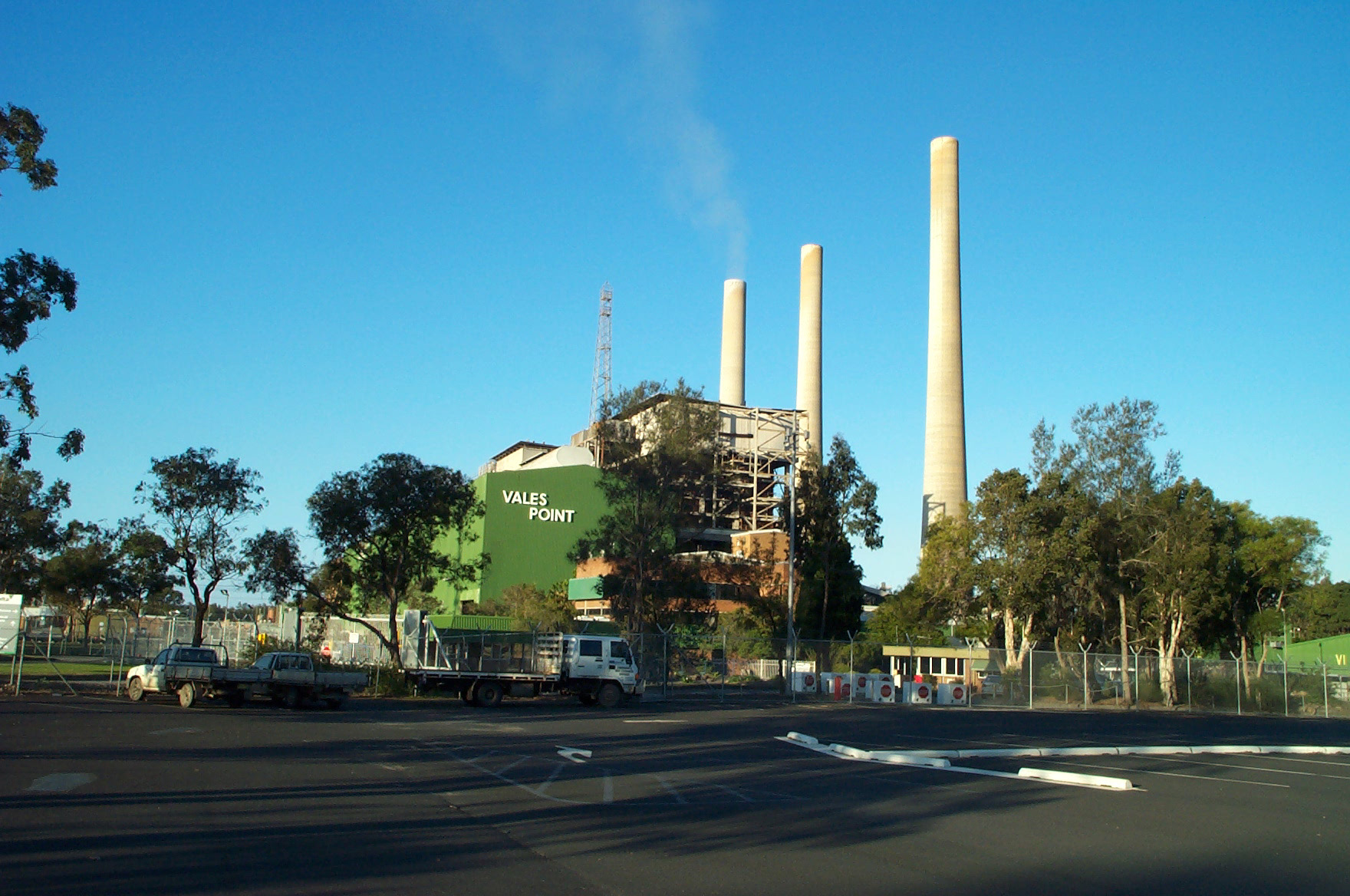
- Vales Point Power Station in 2006
- Location of Vales Point Power Station in New South Wales
- Country: Australia
- Location: Lake Macquarie, New South Wales, Australia
- Coordinates: 33°9′38″S 151°32′31″E
- Status: Operational
- Commission date: 1978
- Owner: Sunset Power International
- Operator: Delta Electricity

Thermal power station
- Primary fuel: Coal
- Turbine technology: Steam turbine

Power generation
- Units operational: 2 × 660 megawatts (890,000 hp)
- Make and model: Tokyo Shibaura Electric (Japan)
- Nameplate capacity: 1,320 MW
- Capacity factor: 63.75% (average 2017-2021)
- Annual net output: 7,372 GW·h (average 2017-2021)

External links
- Commons: Related media on Commons

Vales Point Power Station is one of two operating coal fired power stations on the shores of Lake Macquarie, New South Wales. Vales Point is located on the southern shore of the lake, near the township of Mannering Park. It has two steam turbines, with a total generating capacity of 1,320 MW (1,770,000 hp) of electricity.

Vales Point was the first major power station in New South Wales to be located near its fuel source (coal).

In November 2015, the Government of New South Wales sold Delta Electricity, which at that time owned only the Vales Point Power Station, to Sunset Power International for $1 million.

In 2017 it was valued at $732 million, and was estimated to make part-owner energy entrepreneur and former National Party candidate Trevor St Baker a half billionaire. However, in December 2021, the value of the plant was cut to $156 million and the annual profit was reduced 93% to $9.3 million. The owner blamed the COVID-19 pandemic for reducing demand and an influx of cheaper renewables reducing wholesale electricity prices.

In September 2022 Sunset Power owners announced the sale of Vales Point Power Station to a Czech family investment group Sev.En Global Investments.

== A station ==
Vales Point was originally equipped with three turbo-alternators of 200 MW supplied by English Electric (unit nos. 1 to 3) and one of 275 MW supplied by Associated Electrical Industries (unit no. 4), for a total of 875 MW. The first two units were completed in 1963, and the third in 1964. Unit no. 4 was brought into use in 1966. In order to supply coal to the station, three mines were opened; Chain Valley Colliery, Newvale No.1 Colliery and Wyee State Mine. These four units were known as 'A' Station, its capacity of 875 MW being the highest in New South Wales at the time. Vales Point 'A' Station was decommissioned in 1989. The turbines were removed in 1997; the boilers and buildings were demolished between 2011 and 2014.

== B station ==
In 1978, two Toshiba 660 MW units were added, becoming "B" Station. The combined capacity of 2195 MW made Vales Point the largest power station in Australia at the time. The Toshiba 660 MW turbo-alternator became the standard in New South Wales, with similar units later being installed at Eraring, Bayswater and Mount Piper.

Vales Point uses salt water from Lake Macquarie for cooling. The coal for Vales Point is delivered by conveyor and a balloon loop connection to the Main Northern railway line between Wyee and Morisset. The balloon loop opened in March 1980.

Carbon Monitoring for Action estimates this power station emits 9.32 million tonnes of greenhouse gases each year as a result of burning hydrocarbon fuels.

== Operations ==
The generation table uses eljmkt nemlog to obtain generation values for each year. Records date back to 2011.

Vales Point Power Station Generation (MWh)
Year	Total	VP5	VP6
2011	6,516,860	2,495,684	4,021,176
2012	6,938,509	3,620,823	3,317,686
2013	7,010,188	3,569,378	3,440,810
2014	6,176,260	2,366,027	3,810,233
2015	8,168,604	4,125,051	4,043,553
2016	7,836,279	4,321,004	3,515,275
2017	8,091,776	4,257,578	3,834,198
2018	7,582,125	3,354,930	4,227,195
2019	8,086,786	4,050,653	4,036,133
2020	6,769,304	3,005,181	3,764,123
2021	6,331,416	3,599,742	2,731,674

== Excessive nitrogen oxide pollutants ==
As of 2021, the Vales Point Power Station emits more toxic nitrogen oxide pollutants than allowable under the NSW Protection of the Environment Operations (Clean Air) Regulation 2021 in order to continue to legally operate (or otherwise cease operating), the operator applied for an exemption under its licence 761, which was granted on 15 December 2021 with a reduction variation and additional conditions imposed by the New South Wales Environment Protection Authority.

== In popular culture ==
Vales Point Power Station was used as the location for the Midnight Oil US Forces music video.

== See also ==
- Chain Valley Colliery
- Eraring Power Station
- Munmorah Power Station
- National Pollutant Inventory
