= Noel Miller =

Noel Miller may refer to:

- Noel Miller (comedian) (born 1989), Canadian-American comedian
- Noel Miller (cricketer) (1913–2007), Australian cricketer
