= WNV (disambiguation) =

WNV most commonly refers to the West Nile virus.

WNV may also refer to:

- Western Nevada, a place in Nevada, United States
- Warnervale railway station, the station code WNV
- Wehrmachtführungsstab, a department of the Funkabwehr, a radio counterintelligence organization
