= Bushells Ridge =

- Suburb
- /0/queryThe property query is required; /0/idsThe property ids is required; /0Failed to match at least one schema; /0/titleThe property title is required; /0/serviceThe property service is required; /0Failed to match exactly one schema; /0/geometriesThe property geometries is required; /0/typeDoes not have a value in the enumeration ["GeometryCollection"]; /0/typeDoes not have a value in the enumeration ["MultiPolygon"]; /0/typeDoes not have a value in the enumeration ["Point"]; /0/typeDoes not have a value in the enumeration ["MultiPoint"]; /0/typeDoes not have a value in the enumeration ["LineString"]; /0/typeDoes not have a value in the enumeration ["MultiLineString"]; /0/typeDoes not have a value in the enumeration ["Polygon"]; /0/coordinatesThe property coordinates is required; /0/geometryThe property geometry is required; /0/typeDoes not have a value in the enumeration ["Feature"]; /0/featuresThe property features is required; /0/typeDoes not have a value in the enumeration ["FeatureCollection"]
- Coordinates: 33°11′56″S 151°28′05″E
- Country: Australia
- State: New South Wales
- City: Central Coast
- LGA: Central Coast Council
- Location: 28 km (17 mi) N of The Entrance; 15 km (9.3 mi) NE of Wyong; 55 km (34 mi) SW of Newcastle; 34 km (21 mi) NNE of Gosford; 104 km (65 mi) NNE of Sydney

Government
  - State electorate: Wyong
  - Federal division: Dobell
- Elevation: 54 m (177 ft)
- Postcode: 2259
- Parish: Munmorah
Suburbs around Bushells Ridge
	Wyee
Kiar	Bushells Ridge	Blue Haven
Wallarah	Woongarrah

Bushells Ridge is a northern locality of the Central Coast region of New South Wales, Australia. It is part of the Central Coast Council local government area.

It has been earmarked as an Aboriginal Employment Zone & earmarked for development.
