= Chain Valley Colliery =

Coal mine in New South Wales, Australia

Coordinates: 33.1636°S 151.5496°E

- Interactive map of Chain Valley Colliery
- Location: Mannering Park, New South Wales, Australia
- Products: Coal
- Opened: 1962
- Company: Delta Coal
- Website: https://www.deltacoal.com.au/
- Acquired: 2019

Chain Valley Colliery is a coal mine located at Mannering Park, New South Wales, Australia. The colliery was developed to provide coal for the Vales Point Power Station, adjacent to the mine. The mine started in August 1960, with coal production commencing in 1961. The Wallarah, Great Northern and Fassifern coal seams have been mined using board and pillar, Miniwall and currently Herringbone mining methods. Coal is transported to the Vales Power Station by an overland conveyor system via Mannering Colliery (Wyee State Colliery).

It has had various owners. Currently owned by Delta Coal, a subsidiary of Great Southern Energy. Great Southern Energy also owns Delta Power and Vales Point Power Station.

Past owners include Lake Coal, Peabody and Power Coal.
