= Eucalyptus fracta =

Conservation status
- Vulnerable (IUCN 3.1)

Scientific classification
- Kingdom: Plantae
- Clade: Tracheophytes
- Clade: Angiosperms
- Clade: Eudicots
- Clade: Rosids
- Order: Myrtales
- Family: Myrtaceae
- Genus: Eucalyptus
- Species: E. fracta

Binomial name
- Eucalyptus fracta K.D.Hill

Species of eucalyptus

Eucalyptus fracta is a species of tree or mallee that is endemic to a small area of New South Wales. It has hard, grey to black "ironbark" on the trunk and larger branches, smooth whitish bark above, lance-shaped adult leaves, flower buds in groups of seven, and cup-shaped fruit.

== Description ==
Eucalyptus fracta is a tree or mallee that typically grows to a height of 8 m (26 ft) and has hard, grey to black ironbark on the trunk and branches more than 70 mm (2.8 in) in diameter, smooth whitish bark above. Young plants have dull, bluish green, egg-shaped to more or less round leaves that are 30–60 mm (1.2–2.4 in) long and 24–35 mm (0.94–1.38 in) wide on a petiole 5–8 mm (0.20–0.31 in) long. Adult leaves are the same slightly glossy greyish green on both sides, lance shaped, 70–110 mm (2.8–4.3 in) long and 10–25 mm (0.39–0.98 in) wide on a petiole 8–18 mm (0.31–0.71 in) long. The flower buds are arranged in groups of seven on a branched peduncle 6–10 mm (0.24–0.39 in) long, the individual buds on a pedicel 1–5 mm (0.039–0.197 in) long. Mature buds are spindle-shaped, 6–8 mm (0.24–0.31 in) long and 2–3 mm (0.079–0.118 in) wide with a conical operculum. The fruit is a woody cup-shaped capsule 5–8 mm (0.20–0.31 in) long and 5–7 mm (0.20–0.28 in) wide.

== Taxonomy and naming ==
Eucalyptus fracta was first described in 1997 by Ken Hill from a specimen he collected in Charmhaven with Leonie Stanberg in 1995. The description was published in the journal Telopea. The specific epithet (fracta) is a Latin word meaning "broken", a reference to the species' distribution.

== Distribution and habitat ==
This eucalypt is only known from parts of the Broken Back Range near Cessnock where it grows in shallow soils on a sandstone escarpment.
