= Hamlyn Terrace =

- Suburb
- Interactive map of Hamlyn Terrace
- Coordinates: 33°15′18″S 151°28′23″E
- Country: Australia
- State: New South Wales
- City: Central Coast
- LGA: Central Coast Council
- Location: 8 km (5.0 mi) NE of Wyong

Government
  - State electorate: Wyong
  - Federal division: Dobell

Population
  - Total: 5,225 (2011 census)
- Postcode: 2259
- Parish: Munmorah
Suburbs around Hamlyn Terrace
Wallarah	Woongarrah	Charmhaven
Warnervale	Hamlyn Terrace	Kanwal
Wyong	Wadalba	Kanwal

Hamlyn Terrace is a suburb of the Central Coast region of New South Wales, Australia. It is part of the Central Coast Council local government area. The suburb was formerly part of Warnervale and is part of the Warnervale development precinct. The suburb is split between two governmental wards in the Central Coast Council governmental area, the northern part is in the Budgewoi ward and the rest is in the Wyong ward.

Wyong Hospital is located 8.6 km North-East of Wyong itself in Hamlyn Terrace.
