= Wyee Point =

- Suburb
- Coordinates: 33.14°S 151.526°E
- Country: Australia
- State: New South Wales
- LGA: City of Lake Macquarie
- Location: 10 km (6.2 mi) SE of Morisset; 24 km (15 mi) NNE of Wyong

Government
  - State electorate: Lake Macquarie
  - Federal division: Hunter
- Postcode: 2259
- Parish: Morisset
Suburbs around Wyee Point
Morisset	Morisset	Lake Macquarie
Wyee	Wyee Point	Mannering Park
Wyee	Wyee	Mannering Park

Wyee Point is a far southern suburb of the City of Lake Macquarie in New South Wales, Australia, on the southern shoreline of Lake Macquarie.

== History ==
The Awabakal are the traditional people of this area.

The population of Wyee Point was 1,171 at the 2021 census.
