= Blue Haven =

Blue Haven may refer to:

- Blue Haven, New South Wales, a suburb on the Central Coast of New South Wales, Australia
- Blue Haven, Gauteng, a suburb of Johannesburg, South Africa
