= Roy Ferguson (rugby league) =

Australian rugby league footballer

Personal information
- Full name: Roy Ferguson
- Born: 16 March 1945 Wyong, New South Wales, Australia
- Died: 18 December 2022 (aged 77) Australia

Playing information
- Height: 177 cm (5 ft 10 in)
- Weight: 87 kg (13 st 10 lb)
- Position: Centre
Club
Years	Team	Pld	T	G	FG	P
1964–71	Western Suburbs	101	24	0	1	74
1972–76	St. George Dragons	100	30	0	0	90
	Total	201	54	0	1	164
- Source: Whiticker/Hudson

Roy Ferguson (16 March 1945 − 18 December 2022) was an Australian former professional rugby league footballer who played in the 1960s and 1970s. Ferguson was a Sydney rugby league footballer who played for Western Suburbs Magpies and St. George Dragons who originally came from Wyong, New South Wales.

== Playing career ==
Ferguson played eight seasons for Wests between 1964 and 1971. He finished his career at St. George for five seasons between 1972 and 1976, and he was one of the Dragons best players in the 1975 Grand Final.

He had a reputation as one of the toughest competitors of the game during his playing career. He played 101 first grade games for Wests and 100 first grade games for St. George, making him the first player to play 100 first grade games for two different clubs, and he scored 54 first class tries in his career.
