= Munmorah Power Station =

Former power station in NSW Australia

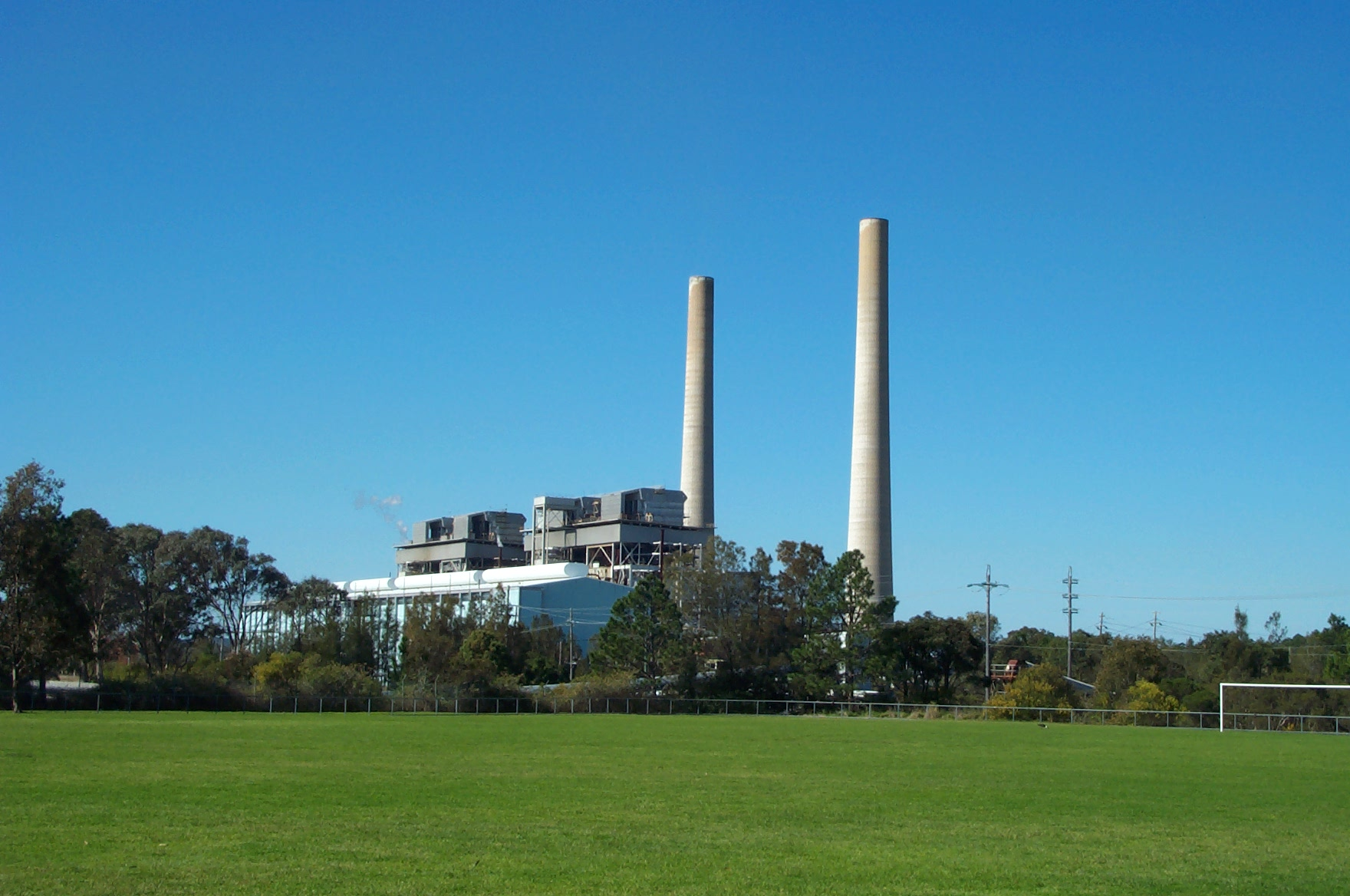
- Munmorah Power Station
- Country: Australia
- Location: near Doyalson, Lake Munmorah, New South Wales
- Coordinates: 33.211781°S 151.542161°E
- Status: Decommissioned
- Commission date: 1967
- Decommission date: 2012
- Owner: Delta Electricity

Thermal power station
- Primary fuel: Bituminous coal
- Turbine technology: Steam turbine

Power generation
- Units operational: 350 MW
- Nameplate capacity: 1400 MW

External links
- Commons: Related media on Commons

Munmorah Power Station is a demolished coal-fired power station with four 350 MW English Electric steam driven turbo-alternators for a combined capacity of 1,400 MW. The station was located near Doyalson, on the shores of Lake Munmorah, New South Wales, Australia and was owned and operated by Delta Electricity, a company owned by the New South Wales Government.

In July 2012 the coal-fired generators were permanently retired from service, with demolition occurring from 2016 to 2018. However, the nearby gas-fired Colongra power station, which was commissioned in 2009, remains in operation.

== History and facilities ==
The station was constructed with 4 English Electric 350 MW turbo-alternators. Munmorah had a total capacity of 1,400 MW. Steam was supplied at a pressure of 2,500 psi and a temperature of 460 °C. One unit was completed in 1967, another in 1968, and the remaining two in 1969. Units 3 and 4 had fabric filters fitted in the 1980s, and this reduced load to 320 MW each. Units 1 and 2 were relegated to emergency use from 1992.

Munmorah drew salt water from Lake Munmorah, part of the Tuggerah Lakes, for condenser cooling. The coal for Munmorah came from two underground mines, Munmorah State mine and Newvale No.2 Colliery, and also from Vales Point coal storage via a series of conveyor belts.

In September 2007, the New South Wales State Government announced the commencement of a trial of 'clean coal' technology at Munmorah Power Station. The A$5 million trial by the CSIRO and Delta Electricity was part of a larger A$150 million trial jointly funded by the coal companies.

On 15 November 2007, 15 Greenpeace activists entered the power station property and switched off one of the conveyor belts as a protest against the climate change policies of the Liberal Party of Australia and Australian Labor Party in the run up to the 2007 federal election.

In 2012 Carbon Monitoring for Action estimated the power station emitted 4.246 million tonnes of greenhouse gases as a result of burning coal.

== Closure ==
Delta Electricity announced on 3 July 2012 the closure of Munmorah power station after 45 years of operation due to decreasing energy demand. Parts of the boilers and turbines needed to be replaced which would have cost about $AUD 400 million. Units 3 and 4 had been maintained on standby but had not been in production since August 2010. Munmorah was disconnected from the grid in May 2014 and completely de-commissioned. Plans were made to demolish the station and its out-buildings and sell off the 500 acres of surrounding land for housing and sporting venues.

== Chimney Stacks ==
- 2 Emission Stacks at a height of 155 metres tall.

== Demolition ==
In 2013 was the beginning for demolition to begin on Munmorah Power Station facilities, the first move was to pull away parts from the boilers. That included some facilities inside the boilers and the vents that went to the emission stacks from the boiler facility. In 2015, was time to disconnect all vintage equipment from the large shed and boiler and send them off to the scrap heap. In December 2015 a survey of the power station precinct found that pollutants(diesel) had entered the water table and made some areas unsuitable for housing.

Demolition started in 2016 and was completed by the end of 2018.

On 26 March 2017 at 10:10am, the two Emission Stacks at 155 metres tall, came crashing down by a controlled demolition. Demolition of the boilers occurred in May 2017 and 2018.

== Popular Times at Munmorah Power Station ==
A documentary was based on Munmorah Power Station in the mid 1990s, detailing effects to our environment from coal-fired power stations like Munmorah.

== Plant information ==
=== Emission stacks ===
- Amount: 2
- Height: 155m
- Diameter at base: 23m
- Diameter at top: 12m
- Status: demolished

=== Battery ===
Construction of the 850 MW and 1680 MWh Waratah grid battery began in 2024, testing in 2025. One of the three 330 kV transformers failed catastrophically on 18 October 2025, delaying the project. The battery's purpose was to serve as transmission backup stability, rather than energy arbitrage, as the Eraring power station was set to close. However, Eraring was kept open. The battery was completed in 2026, and its contract was changed to provide regular battery services daily, and only serve as transmission backup with day-ahead notice.

== Engineering heritage award ==
The power station received an Engineering Heritage Marker from Engineers Australia as part of its Engineering Heritage Recognition Program.

== See also ==
- Lake Munmorah
- Wyong Shire Council
- Eraring power station
- Vales Point power station
- Colongra Gas Generation Plant
- Delta Electricity – Government-owned corporation that is the holding company for Munmorah Power Station
