= Mannering Park =

Coordinates: 33°08′53″S 151°32′06″E

- Suburb
- Interactive map of Mannering Park
- Country: Australia
- State: New South Wales
- City: Central Coast
- LGA: Central Coast Council
- Location: 50 km (31 mi) SSW of Newcastle; 22 km (14 mi) NNE of Wyong; 43 km (27 mi) NNE of Gosford; 28 km (17 mi) N of The Entrance; 115 km (71 mi) NNE of Sydney

Government
  - State electorate: Swansea
  - Federal division: Shortland
- Elevation: 13 m (43 ft)

Population
  - Total: 2,472 (2016 census)
- Postcode: 2259
- Parish: Wallarah
Suburbs around Mannering Park
Wyee Point	Lake Macquarie	Summerland Point
Wyee	Mannering Park	Chain Valley Bay
Doyalson	Colongra	Doyalson North

Mannering Park is a suburb of the Central Coast region of New South Wales, Australia. It is part of the Central Coast Council local government area. It was formerly called Vales Point.

Mannering Park has a public school, tennis courts, open basketball and netball courts, tourist park (BIG4 Lake Macquarie Monterey Tourist Park), two ovals, a number of public access parks, sailing club also known as MPASC (Mannering Park Amateur Sailing Club), sea scout group, and a long lakefront reserve.

The shops in the main street include two takeaway food shops, a cafe, two real estate agents, a post office, a mini-mart (which sells fuel), a hairdresser/beauty therapist, a newsagent, pharmacist.

The local industries include Vales Point Power Station and Wyee State Coal Mine.
