= Wyongah =

- Suburb
- Interactive map of Wyongah
- Coordinates: 33.273°S 151.485°E
- Country: Australia
- State: New South Wales
- City: Central Coast
- LGA: Central Coast Council
- Location: 8 km (5.0 mi) ENE of Wyong

Government
  - State electorate: Wyong
  - Federal division: Dobell

Area
  - Total: 0.9 km^{2} (0.35 sq mi)
- Postcode: 2259
- Parish: Munmorah
Suburbs around Wyongah
| Kanwal | Kanwal | Gorokan |
| Wadalba | Wyongah | Tuggerah Lake |
| Wadalba | Tuggerawong | Tuggerah Lake |

Wyongah is a suburb of the Central Coast region of New South Wales, Australia. It is part of the Central Coast Council local government area.

Wyongah is mostly residential, although there is a small shopping area in the suburb. The area is close to Wyong Hospital and is serviced by Busways route 81, 82 and 83 buses. Routes 81 and 82 run from Lake Haven to Wyong and Tuggerah via Wyongah (and return) while the 83 is a local service from Lake Haven to Wyongah.

== Demographics ==
In the 2016 census the population of Wyongah was 2,020 and remained unchanged in the 2021 census.

== Notable people ==
- Bob Mirovic, boxer
