= Mackillop Catholic College, Warnervale =

School in New South Wales, Australia

Mackillop Catholic College

Location
- 91 Sparks Rd, Woongarrah, New South Wales, Australia 2259; 33.24130°S 151.46795°E

Information
- Former name: The Blessed Mary Mackillop Catholic College
- School type: Private
- Motto: Christ Our Light
- Religious affiliation: Catholicism
- Patron saint: Mary Mackillop
- Established: 2003
- Founders: Janine Silver, Stephen Aitken, Father John Hodgson, Debra Ferguson, Michael Rickards, Katherine Ardern,
- Principal: Tanya Appleby
- Years offered: Kindergarten – Year 12
- Campuses: Primary, Secondary
- Houses: Temuka Penola; Gesu Fitzroy; Alma Kincumber
- Colours: Red; White; Blue
- Mascot: Kiwi, Stingray, Wolf, Kangaroo, Kookaburra, Eagle
- Website: Official site

Mackillop Catholic College is an independent Roman Catholic co-educational primary and secondary school located in both the Central Coast suburbs of Woongarrah and Warnervale. It is administered by Catholic Schools Broken Bay, with an enrolment of 1,511 students and a teaching staff of 127, as of 2023. The school serves students from Kindergarten to Year 12.

== History ==
The school opened in 2003 and had its 10th anniversary in 2013. Between its opening in 2003 and 2009, the school underwent further construction, with the total cost reaching $44 million. In 2024, a plan for another $5 million toward facilities was submitted to the Central Coast Council. The plan is still under review by the council as of January 2025.

The first graduating class occurred in 2008, with 80 out of the 131 foundation students obtaining the Higher School Certificate.

== Demographics ==
In 2021, the school had a student enrolment of 1,489 students with 121 teachers (104.5 full-time equivalent) and 32 non-teaching staff (21.6 full-time equivalent). Female enrolments consisted of 763 students and Male enrolments consisted of 726 students; Indigenous enrolments accounted for a total of 7% and 16% of students had a language background other than English.

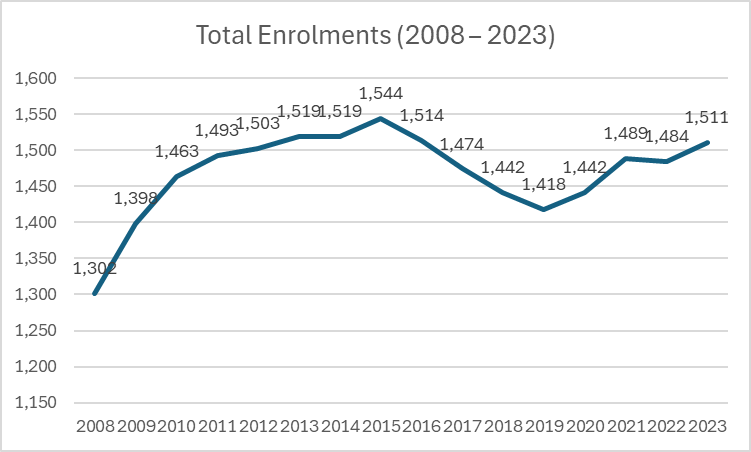
Mackillop Catholic College Enrolment Data from 2008 to 2023

In 2022, the school had a student enrolment of 1,484 students with 121 teachers (107.1 full-time equivalent) and 35 non-teaching staff (23.4 full-time equivalent). Female enrolments consisted of 769 students and Male enrolments consisted of 715 students; Indigenous enrolments accounted for a total of 6% and 18% of students had a language background other than English. In 2023, the school had a student enrolment of 1,511 with 127 teachers (114.7 full-time equivalent) and 37 non-teaching staff (24.3 full-time equivalent). Female enrolments consisted of 796 students and Male enrolments consisted of 715 students; Indigenous enrolments accounted for a total of 7% and 20% of students had a language background other than English.

== Notable alumni ==
- Jack Cogger, rugby league player
- Lannan Eacott, YouTuber, professional gamer and Internet personality

== See also ==
- Education in New South Wales
- List of non-government schools in New South Wales
- List of Catholic schools in New South Wales
- List of schools in the Hunter and Central Coast
