= Doyalson =

Doyalson Central Coast, New South Wales
- Coordinates: 33°11′56″S 151°31′5″E
- Population: 299 (2021 census)
- Postcode(s): 2262
- Elevation: 34 m (112 ft)
- Location: 21 km (13 mi) N of The Entrance; 17 km (11 mi) NE of Wyong; 53 km (33 mi) SW of Newcastle; 37 km (23 mi) NNE of Gosford; 107 km (66 mi) NNE of Sydney
- LGA(s): Central Coast Council
- Parish: Munmorah
- State electorate(s): Wyong; Swansea
- Federal division(s): Shortland; Dobell
Suburbs around Doyalson:
Wyee	Wyee	Doyalson North
Bushells Ridge	Doyalson	Colongra
Wallarah	Blue Haven	San Remo

Doyalson is a village in the Central Coast region of New South Wales, Australia. It is part of the Central Coast Council local government area. It has a population of 299 at the 2021 census.

The Pacific Highway passes through Doyalson. In the 1980s, the seven kilometre Doyalson Link Road was built between Doyalson and the M1 Motorway at Bushells Ridge. It was built as a single carriageway with provision for conversion to a dual carriageway.

Munmorah State Coal Mine operated in this vicinity 1962–2005.
