= Charmhaven =

Charmhaven Central Coast, New South Wales
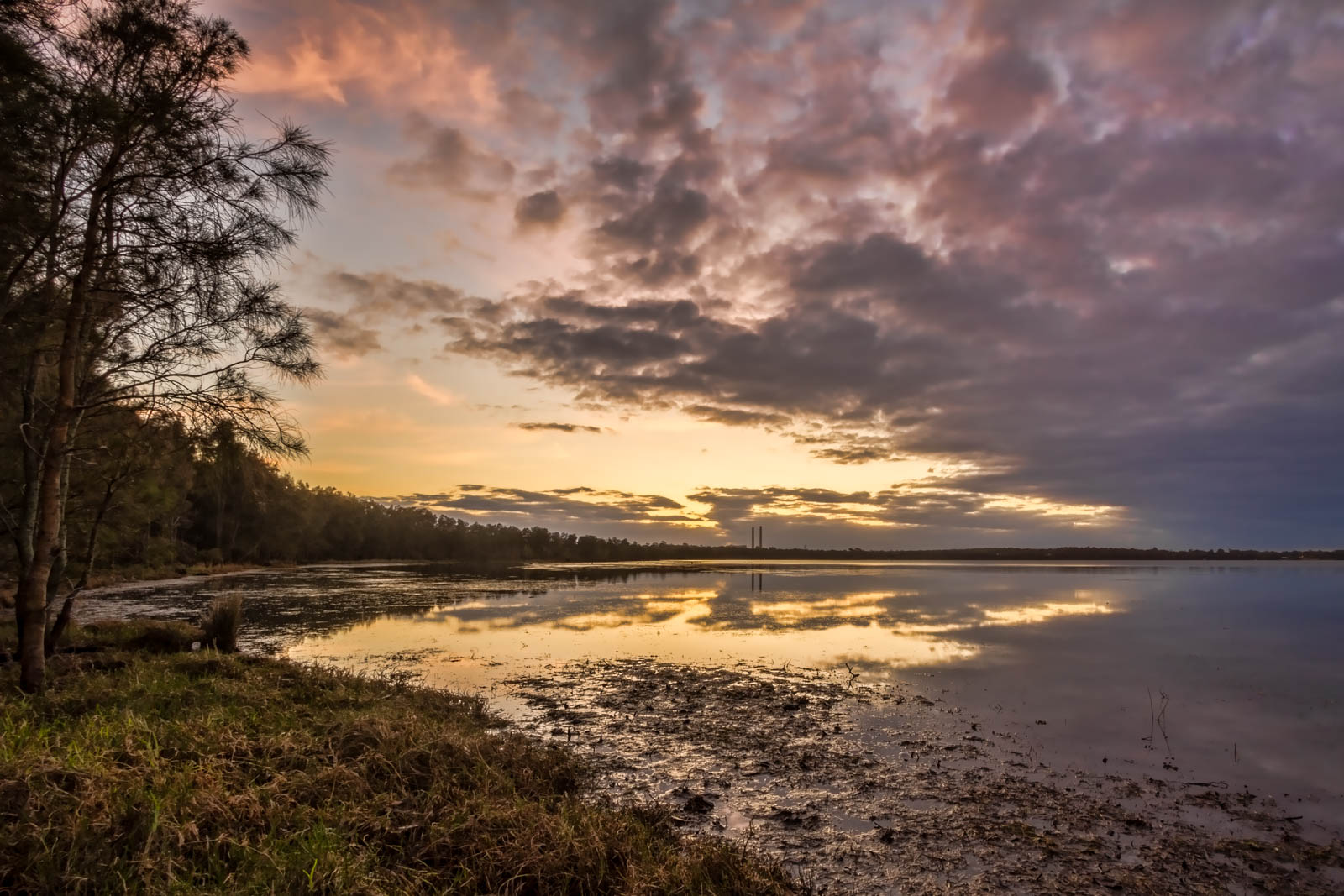
- Sunrise over Budgewoi Lake from Charmhaven Reserve

- Coordinates: 33°13′23″S 151°30′36″E
- Population: 2,551 (2016 census)
- Postcode(s): 2263
- Elevation: 15 m (49 ft)
- Location: 13 km (8 mi) NE of Wyong; 21 km (13 mi) N of The Entrance; 52 km (32 mi) SW of Newcastle; 39 km (24 mi) NNE of Gosford; 109 km (68 mi) N of Sydney
- LGA(s): Central Coast Council
- Parish: Munmorah
- State electorate(s): Wyong
- Federal division(s): Dobell, Shortland
Suburbs around Charmhaven:
Doyalson	Blue Haven	San Remo
Wallarah	Charmhaven	Budgewoi Lake
Woongarrah	Kanwal	Lake Haven

Charmhaven is a suburb of the Central Coast region of New South Wales, Australia. It is part of the Central Coast Council local government area.

Residential homes lie on the east side of Pacific Highway with some homes lined along Budgewoi Lake and with bush land west of the highway.

== Transportation ==
The main arterial road in Charmhaven is in the Pacific Motorway and connects with Doyalson Link Road.

Several bus routes service Charmhaven, Operated by Busways Wyong and Coastal Liner (CDCNSW)

90: BUDGEWOI Lake loop (Anti-Clockwise)

92: BUDGEWOI Lake loop (Clockwise)

94: BUDGEWOI to Wyong and/or Tuggerah DIRECT Via Pacific Highway

95: LAKE HAVEN to Morisset Via Gwandalan

95X: LAKE HAVEN to Wyee Stn Via Gwandalan

97: LAKE HAVEN to Mannering Park and/or Wyee Point and Wyee Station

98: LAKE HAVEN to BLUE HAVEN LOOP

98: LAKE HAVEN to Chain Valley Bay (Nth and/or Sth)

99: LAKE HAVEN to Lake Munmorah and/or Chain Valley Bay, Gwandalan, Summerland Point, Swansea and Charlestown.

As of November 2010, with the revision of OMBSC 6 (Busways Central Coast) it was agreed that Coastal Liner (Now CDCNSW) would operate several Busways runs, 98 Blue Haven loop being one of them only during certain times of the day, OPAL cards can still be used on Coastal Liner services.

== Government ==
=== Local ===
Charmhaven is located in the Budgewoi Ward of Central Coast Council.

== Attractions ==
- Charmhaven Park
- Parkside Reserve
- Charmhaven Reserve

== Economy ==
Charmhaven was home to a Kellogg's snack and cereal plant, but it closed in 2014 and production moved to Thailand.
