= Wyong Public School =

Primary school in New South Wales

Location
- Cutler Drive, Wyong, New South Wales, Australia
- 33.271886°S 151.426188°E

Information
- School type: Public co-educational primary day school
- Motto: Create; Inspire; Succeed
- Established: 1888
- Principal: Mitchell Welham
- Years offered: Kindergarten – Year 6
- Enrolment: 417 (2023)
- Website: Official website

Wyong Public School is a public co-educational primary school located in the Central Coast town of Wyong, New South Wales, Australia. It is administered by the New South Wales Department of Education, with an enrolment of 417 students and a teaching staff of 29, as of 2023. Currently led by Principal Mitchell Welham, the school serves students from Kindergarten to Year 6.

When the original school opened in 1888, it was located in temporary accommodation known as Watt's Concert Hall. In May 1889, the pupils moved to the Alison Road School and in September 1979, the school opened at the current site on Cutler Drive.

== History ==
Charles Alison, a resident of the local area, wrote a letter to the Department of Education in December 1887 requesting an application form for establishing a school. The application was dated 20th April 1888 and on 12 June the very same year, James Inglis, via the Department of Education, announced in the New South Wales Government Gazette that a public school was being proposed in the town of Wyong.

The first teacher, William Berry, was appointed on 28 June 1888 and he opened the school on Monday, 2nd July 1888. It opened as a public school and remained one until December 1943, opening as a Central School in January 1944. It remained as a Central School until December 1949 and was subsequently turned back to a public school the following year.

== Opportunity class ==
Wyong Public School is a designated regional hub for the New South Wales Department of Education's Opportunity Class (OC) program, which caters to high-potential and academically gifted students. The school operates two self-contained, full-time classes: one for Year 5 and one for Year 6.

Enrolment into the two-year program is managed centrally by the Department's Selective Education team and is determined by academic merit through the state-wide Opportunity Class Placement Test. Because placement is not bound by local school catchments, the program draws eligible students from both the local Wyong area and the broader Central Coast region.

== Demographics ==
In 2021, the school had a student enrolment of 462 students with 27 teachers (29.1 full-time equivalent) and 11 non-teaching staff (7.5 full-time equivalent). Female enrolments consisted of 212 students and Male enrolments consisted of 250 students; Indigenous enrolments accounted for a total of 24% and 18% of students had a language background other than English.

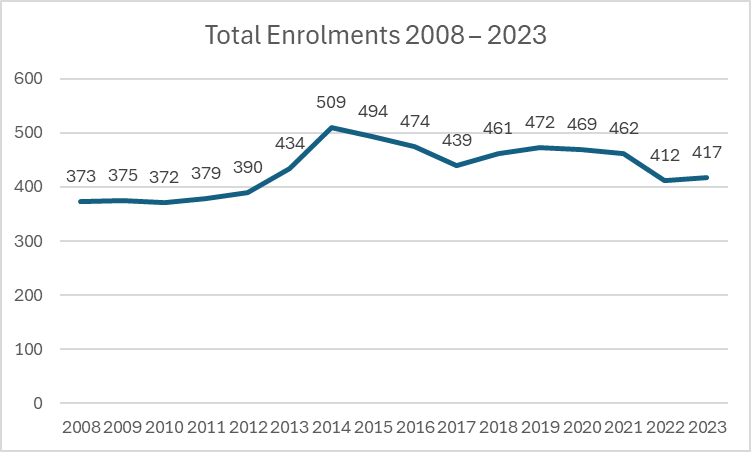
Wyong Public School Enrolment Data from 2008 to 2023

In 2022, the school had a student enrolment of 412 students with 28 teachers (28.3 full-time equivalent) and 11 non-teaching staff (7.3 full-time equivalent). Female enrolments consisted of 192 students and Male enrolments consisted of 220 students; Indigenous enrolments accounted for a total of 24% and 21% of students had a language background other than English.

In 2023, the school had a student enrolment of 417 students with 29 teachers (27.2 full-time equivalent) and 12 non-teaching staff (7.3 full-time equivalent). Female enrolments consisted of 194 students and Male enrolments consisted of 223 students; Indigenous enrolments accounted for a total of 22% and 20% of students had a language background other than English.

== See also ==
- Education in New South Wales
- List of government schools in New South Wales: Q–Z
- List of schools in the Hunter and Central Coast
