= Watanobbi =

- Suburb
- Interactive map of Watanobbi
- Coordinates: 33°16′8″S 151°25′34″E
- Country: Australia
- State: New South Wales
- City: Central Coast
- LGA: Central Coast Council
- Location: 3 km (1.9 mi) N of Wyong

Government
  - State electorate: Wyong
  - Federal division: Dobell

Area
  - Total: 1.9 km^{2} (0.73 sq mi)

Population
  - Total: 3,774 (2011 census)
  - Density: 1,990/km^{2} (5,140/sq mi)
- Postcode: 2259
- Parish: Munmorah
Suburbs around Watanobbi
Warnervale	Warnervale	Warnervale Wyong
Wyong	Watanobbi	Wyong
Wyong	Wyong	Wyong

Watanobbi is a suburb of the Central Coast region of New South Wales, Australia. It is part of the Central Coast Council local government area, and is part of the Warnervale development precinct. Watanobbi is almost entirely surrounded by the Porters Creek wetlands, which goes to the Tuggerah Lakes catchment, located just west of Tuggerah Lake.

== History ==
Although many believed the name's origin was Aboriginal, with the old Wyong Shire council originally claiming it meant "hills surrounded by water", since Watanobbi was almost entirely surrounded by wetlands, the Geographic Names Board later confirmed there was no Aboriginal significance to the name, with the two most likely sources being a corruption of the Japanese surname Watanabe, ascribed to a friend of well-travelled pioneer Albert Warner, or a comment made by early landowner Allan Chapman about the "nobby" shape of the surrounding terrain, have been suggested. Landowners, claiming they were the butt of rude jokes and that the suburb's house prices had remained static relative to other areas, attempted unsuccessfully to have the name changed to Chapman Gardens in early 2002.

Watanobbi in the last decade also, has seen the removal of grazing livestock and horses to make way for the local Community Centre. Watanobbi also used to hold two legs of the locally famous Watagan Stages car rally; now modern housing occupy those dirt roads. During its most popular days as "the largest Home Show outside of Sydney" Watanobbi boasted outside public toilets, a Commonwealth Bank lending office and as many as five different home builders offices on site. These included Masterton Homes and AVJennings.
