= Wyee, New South Wales =

Wyee
- Suburb
- Coordinates: 33.182°S 151.485°E
- Country: Australia
- State: New South Wales
- Region: Hunter; Central Coast
- City: Central Coast
- LGA: City of Lake Macquarie
- Location: 106 km (66 mi) NNE of Sydney; 18 km (11 mi) NNE of Wyong; 9 km (5.6 mi) S of Morisset; 36 km (22 mi) N of Gosford; 59 km (37 mi) SSW of Newcastle

Government
  - State electorate: Lake Macquarie
  - Federal division: Hunter
- Elevation: 25 m (82 ft)

Population
  - Total: 2,909 (SAL 2021)
- Postcode: 2259
- Parish: Morisset
Suburbs around Wyee
Mandalong	Morisset	Wyee Point
Mandalong	Wyee	Mannering Park
Jilliby	Bushells Ridge	Doyalson

Wyee (/waɪiː/ WHY-ee) is a small town in the Lake Macquarie and Central Coast regions of New South Wales, Australia, in the City of Lake Macquarie and Central Coast Council. It is near the Sydney-Newcastle Freeway and has a railway station (opened 1892) on NSW TrainLink's Central Coast & Newcastle Line. It had a population of 1,487 in 2001, which significantly increased to 2,337 in 2006 and 2,588 in 2011, decreased to 2,406 in 2016, but rose again in 2021 to 2,909. Parts of Wyee, particularly the area known as 'West Wyee', were originally subdivided as agricultural land. Some, including local councillors, have referred to it as a shanty town, noting that it has remained largely unchanged since World War II.

Wyee is said to be derived from an Awabakal Aboriginal term for "fire" or "place of bushfires".

The Awabakal are the traditional people of this area.

Wyee is part of the City of Lake Macquarie local government area but it lacks a connection to sewer system; there are the Hunter Water Sewage Treatment Plant and the Central Coast Council Treatment Plant in the area, in the neighbouring Central Coast region.

Wyee Colliery, when State-owned, operated here 1962–2002. It re-opened in 2004–05 as Mannering Colliery, operated by the Centennial Coal Coy.

In a part of the town west of the railway station known as West Wyee, people live in an informal settlement, without water and sewerage services. The area was subdivided in 1914 but not zoned for residential development.

== History ==
Wyee is located in the traditional lands of the Awabakal people and is an Aboriginal expression meaning place of bushfires.

The town takes its name from the Wyee railway station. It was originally called Norahville, after its nearest coastal village. In 1887, with the breakthrough of the Main Northern railway line it was renamed Wyee.

In 1839, philanthropist Thomas Walker granted the Wyee area of 1120 acres (4 km). He never took residence in attempts to make improvements and the grant was reverted to the Morisset Parish.

In 2021, a sewer was constructed for the town, and 400 properties were connected. Wastewater was removed by truck from Karagi Street pump station until 2023, when a link to the Dora Creek Wastewater Treatment Works was completed.
