= Wadalba =

- Suburb
- Interactive map of Wadalba
- Coordinates: 33°16′23″S 151°28′5″E
- Country: Australia
- State: New South Wales
- City: Central Coast
- LGA: Central Coast Council
- Location: 6 km (3.7 mi) NE of Wyong

Government
  - State electorate: Wyong
  - Federal division: Dobell

Area
  - Total: 4.1 km^{2} (1.6 sq mi)

Population
  - Total: 2,831 (2016 census)
  - Density: 690/km^{2} (1,788/sq mi)
- Postcode: 2259
- Parish: Munmorah
Suburbs around Wadalba
Warnervale	Hamlyn Terrace	Hamlyn Terrace
Wyong	Wadalba	Kanwal
Tacoma	Tuggerawong	Wyongah

Wadalba is a suburb of the Central Coast region of New South Wales, Australia. It is part of the Central Coast Council local government area.

It contains Wadalba Community School as well as a supermarkets and a shopping centre.
