= William Cape =

William Cape (1773–1847) was a schoolmaster in Sydney and an early settler in the Wyong region.

Cape was born in Ireby, Cumbria. He was a banker in London until 1816. He migrated to Australia in 1822 with his wife and seven children.

In April 1823, he was appointed Master of Sydney Academy, following the death of its founder Isaac Wood. In April 1824, he was appointed Master of the new Sydney Public School. Assisted by his son William Timothy Cape, he organized the school on the Madras System. He was the school's Master until 1827.

Cape and his family were granted land in the Wyong region. In 1825, he had 45 head of cattle on his property. He planted wheat, corn and potatoes.

Cape was hostile to the local Aboriginal people. In 1828 it was reported that Aboriginal people had been taking Cape's corn, and Cape responded by shooting them. Violence escalated, and a group of 200 Aboriginal people assembled and confronted Cape. The local magistrate Willoughby Bean blamed Cape for provoking them.

In 1828, an accident left him with limited mobility. He retired to Sydney where he remained until his death on 19 November 1847.
