= Warnervale railway station =

Railway station in New South Wales, Australia

Warnervale
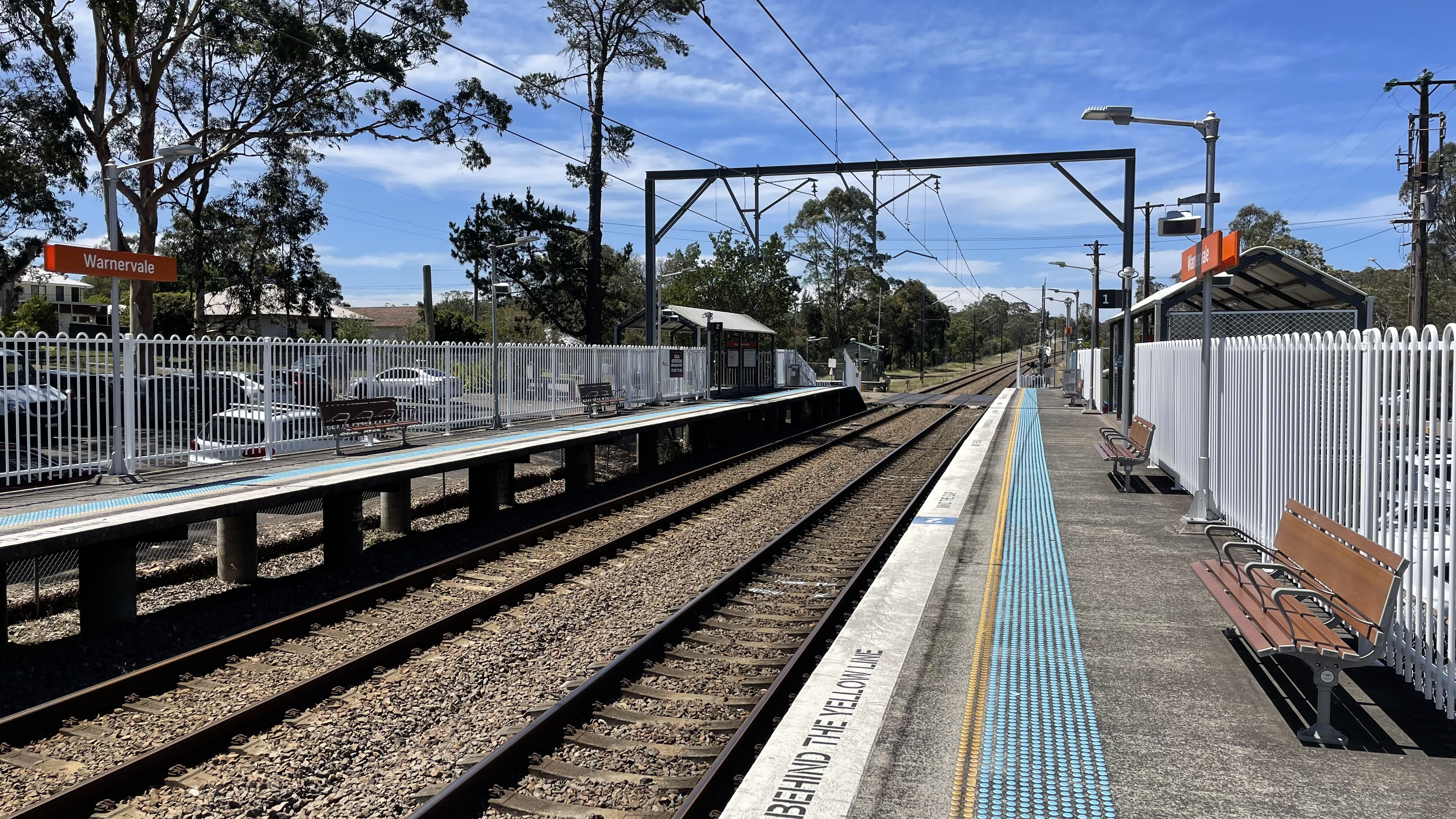
- Northbound view from Platform 1, October 2023

General information
- Location: Railway Road, Warnervale; Australia
- Coordinates: 33°14′51″S 151°26′55″E
- Owner: Transport Asset Manager of New South Wales
- Operator: Sydney Trains
- Line: Main Northern
- Distance: 105.90 km (65.80 mi) from Central
- Platforms: 2 side
- Tracks: 2
- Connections: Bus

Construction
- Structure type: Ground
- Accessible: Assisted access

Other information
- Station code: WNV
- Website: Transport for NSW

History
- Opened: 2 September 1907; 119 years ago

Passengers
- 2025: 117,893 (year); 323 (daily) (Sydney Trains, NSW TrainLink)

Services
Preceding station	Intercity Trains	Following station
Wyee towards Newcastle Interchange	Central Coast & Newcastle Line	Wyong towards Central
Location

Warnervale railway station is located on the Main Northern line in New South Wales, Australia. It serves the northern Central Coast town of Warnervale and opened on 2 September 1907.

== Platforms and services ==
Warnervale has two side platforms. It is serviced by Sydney Trains Intercity Central Coast & Newcastle Line services travelling between Sydney Central, Gosford and Newcastle.

Platform	Line	Stopping pattern	Notes
1	CCN	Services to Gosford & Sydney Central	
2	CCN	Services to Newcastle	

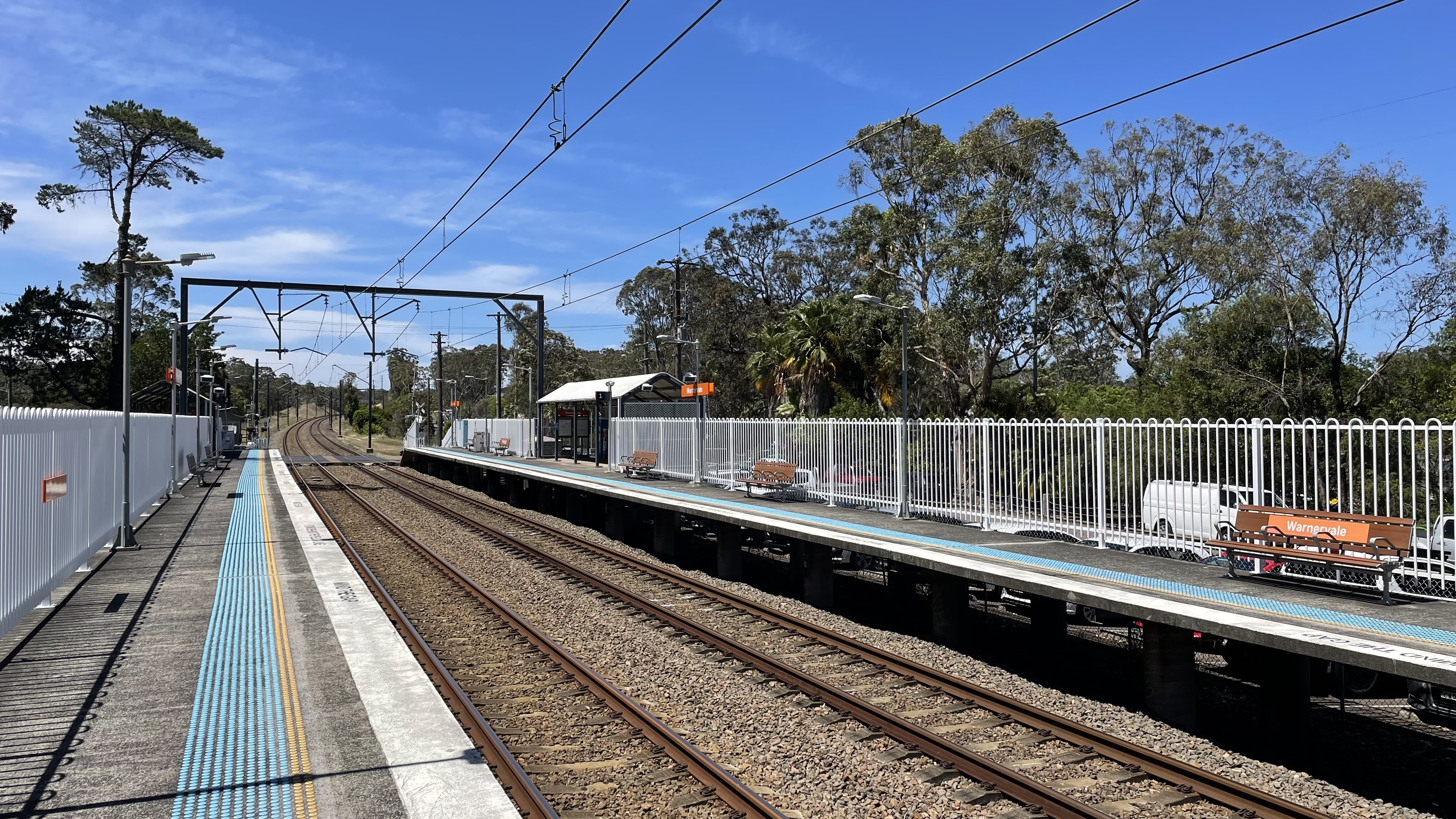
Southbound view from Platform 1

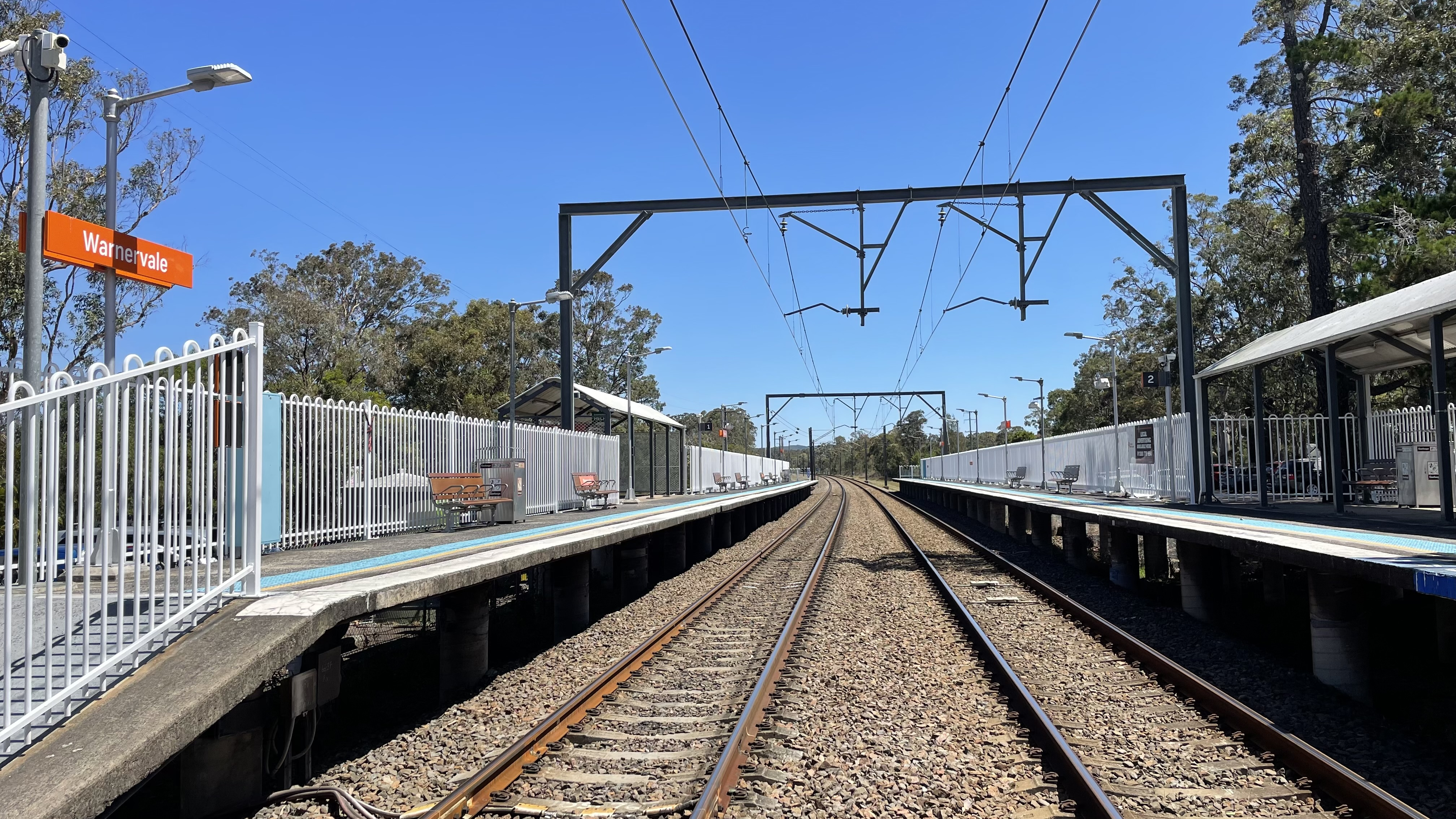
View of Platforms from Railway crossing

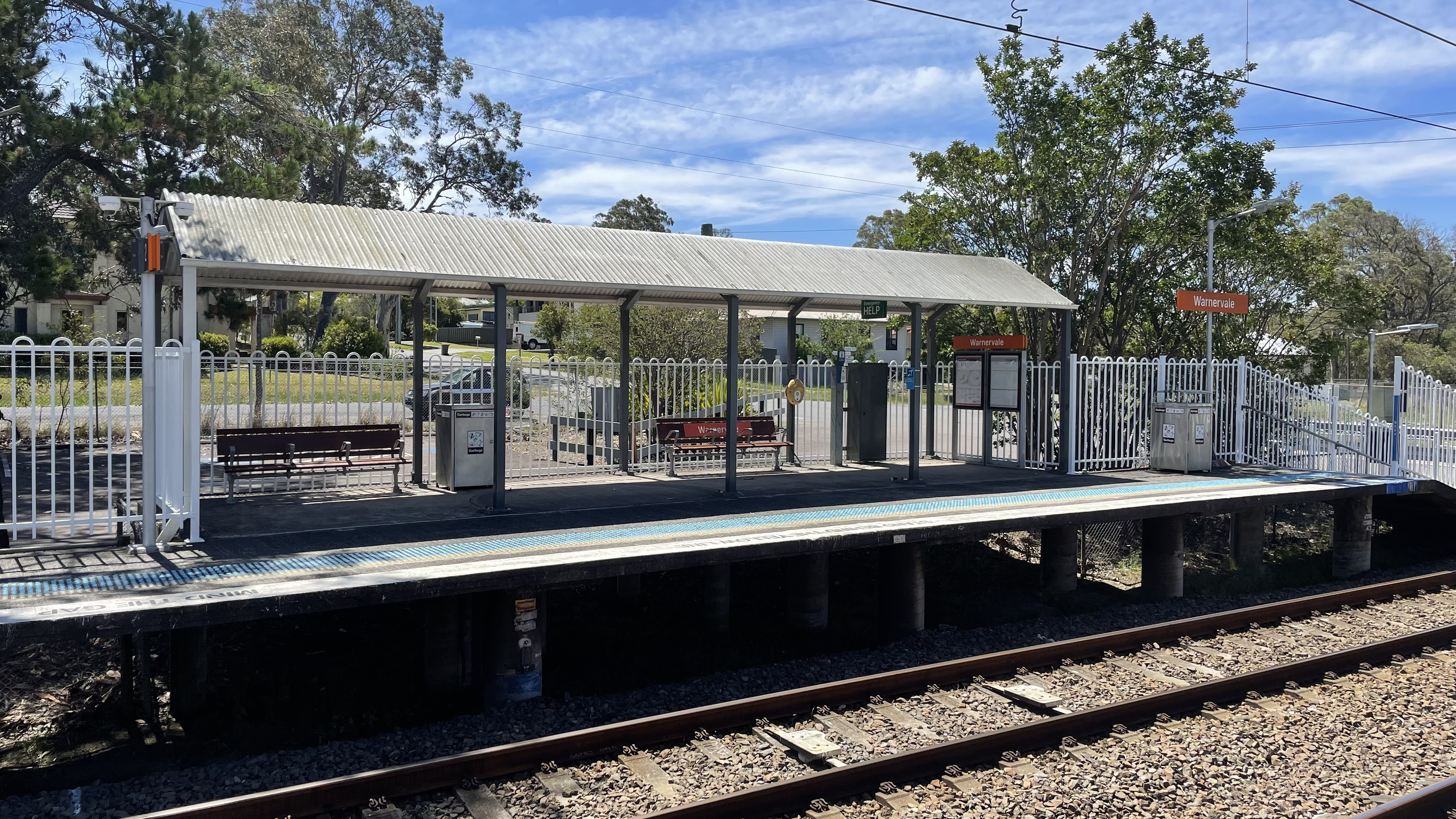
Basic station facilities on Platform 2

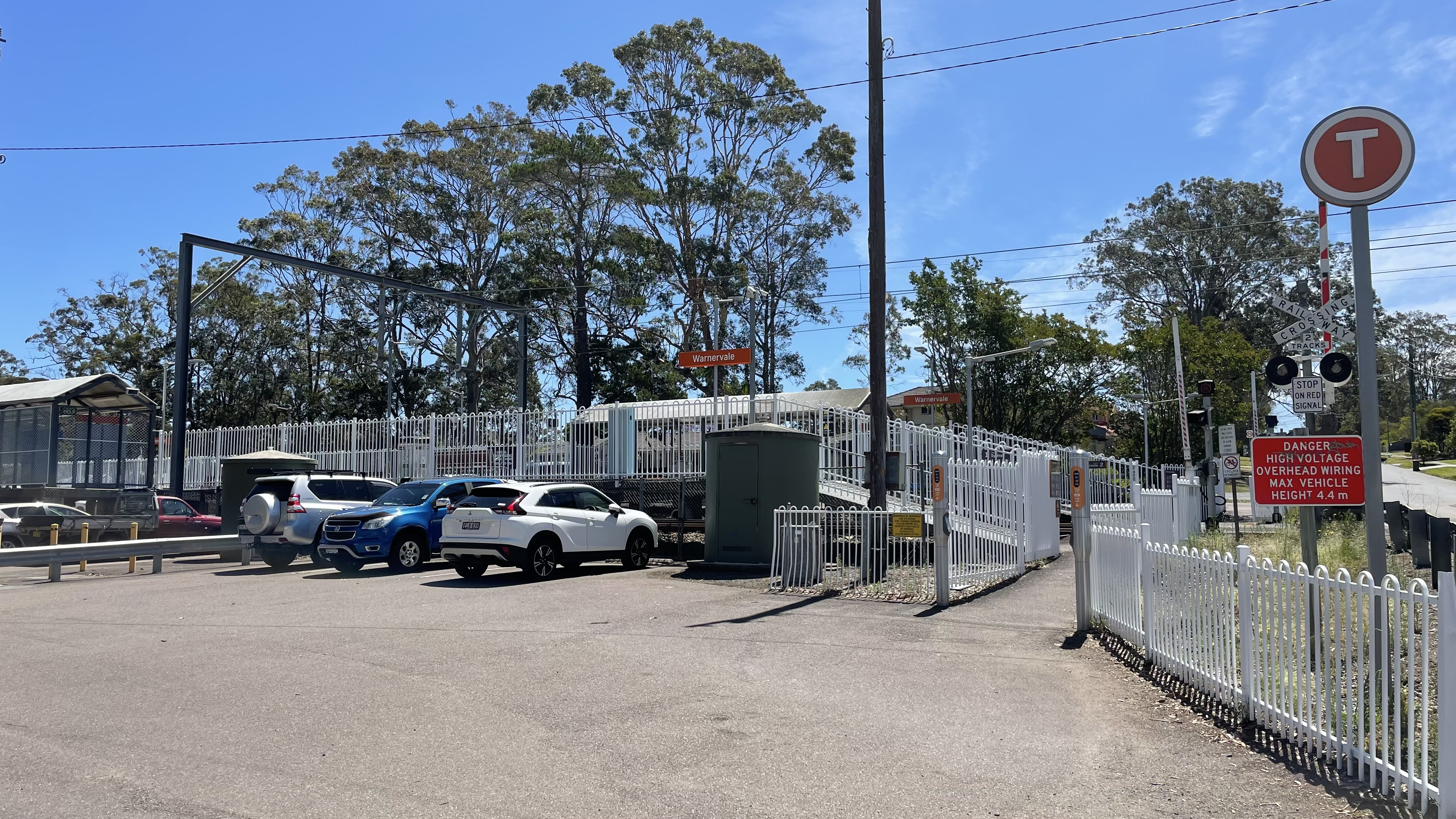
Entrance from Railway Road

== Transport links ==
Busways operates one bus route via Warnervale station, under contract to Transport for NSW:

- 78: Westfield Tuggerah to Lake Haven

Coastal Liner operates two bus routes via Warnervale station, under contract to Transport for NSW:

- 10: Westfield Tuggerah to Warnervale
- 11: Westfield Tuggerah to Lake Haven
