= Noel Miller (cricketer) =

Australian cricketer (1913–2007)

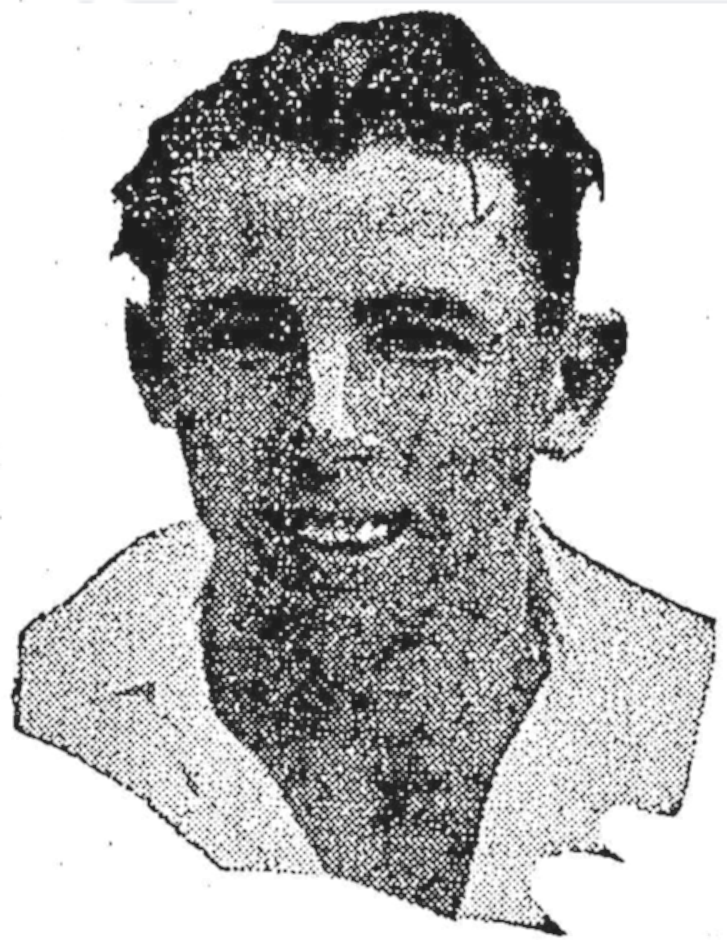

Personal information
- Born: 1 July 1913; Wyong, New South Wales, Australia
- Died: 26 November 2007 (aged 94); Sydney, Australia
- Source: Cricinfo, 8 January 2017

Noel Keith Miller (1 July 1913 – 26 November 2007) was an Australian cricketer. He played one first-class match for New South Wales in 1935/36.

== See also ==
- List of New South Wales representative cricketers
