= Colongra Power Station =

Gas-fired power station in Australia

Colongra Gas Generation Plant
- Country: Australia
- Location: Colongra, New South Wales
- Coordinates: 33°12′38″S 151°32′33″E
- Status: Operational
- Commission date: December 2009
- Owner: Snowy Hydro

Thermal power station
- Primary fuel: Natural gas
- Turbine technology: Open cycle gas turbine

Power generation
- Units operational: 4 GT13E2
- Nameplate capacity: 667 MW

Colongra Gas Generation Plant (also known as Colongra Power Station) is a 667 MW gas-fired power station located in Colongra, New South Wales, Australia, and is the largest gas-fired power station in New South Wales. It will generally be used during peak demand periods in New South Wales.

The plant's construction was tendered to Alstom which began the construction in October 2007, adjacent to the Munmorah coal-fired power station. The plant was completed and commissioned in December 2009 at a cost of A$500 million.

It was bought by Snowy Hydro in January 2015.
