= Warnervale =

- Suburb
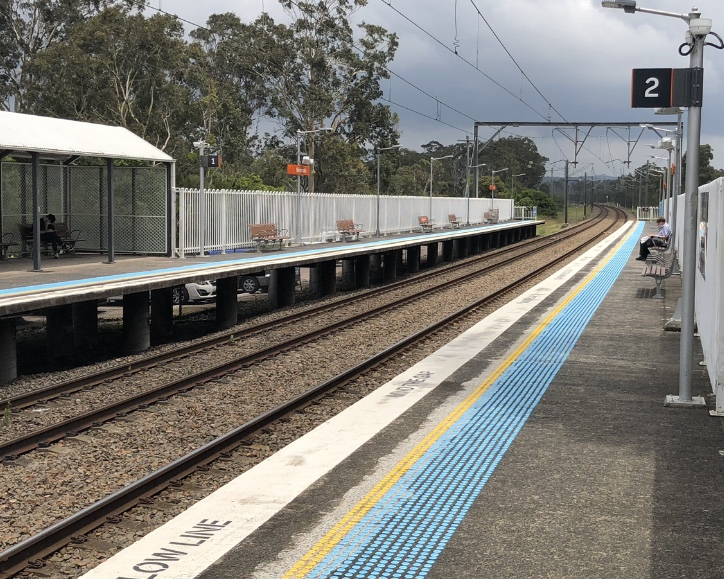
- Warnervale railway station

- Interactive map of Warnervale
- Coordinates: 33.249°S 151.431°E
- Country: Australia
- State: New South Wales
- City: Central Coast
- LGA: Central Coast Council
- Location: 10 km (6.2 mi) N of Wyong; 101 km (63 mi) NNE of Sydney
- Established: 1893

Government
  - State electorate: Wyong
  - Federal division: Dobell

Population
  - Total: 701 (SAL 2021)
- Postcode: 2259
- Parish: Munmorah
Suburbs around Warnervale
Jilliby	Halloran	Wallarah
Jilliby	Warnervale	Hamlyn Terrace
Alison, Wyong	Watanobbi	Wadalba, Wyong

Warnervale is a town in the Central Coast Council local government area in the Central Coast region in the state of New South Wales, Australia. It lies approximately 101 km north of Sydney, located west of Tuggerah Lake, a large shallow coastal lake, and just north of Wyong.

In the 2021 census, the Australian Bureau of Statistics located a population of 701 within Warnervale's boundaries. The broader Warnervale-Wadalba statistical area had 20,051 people.

== History ==
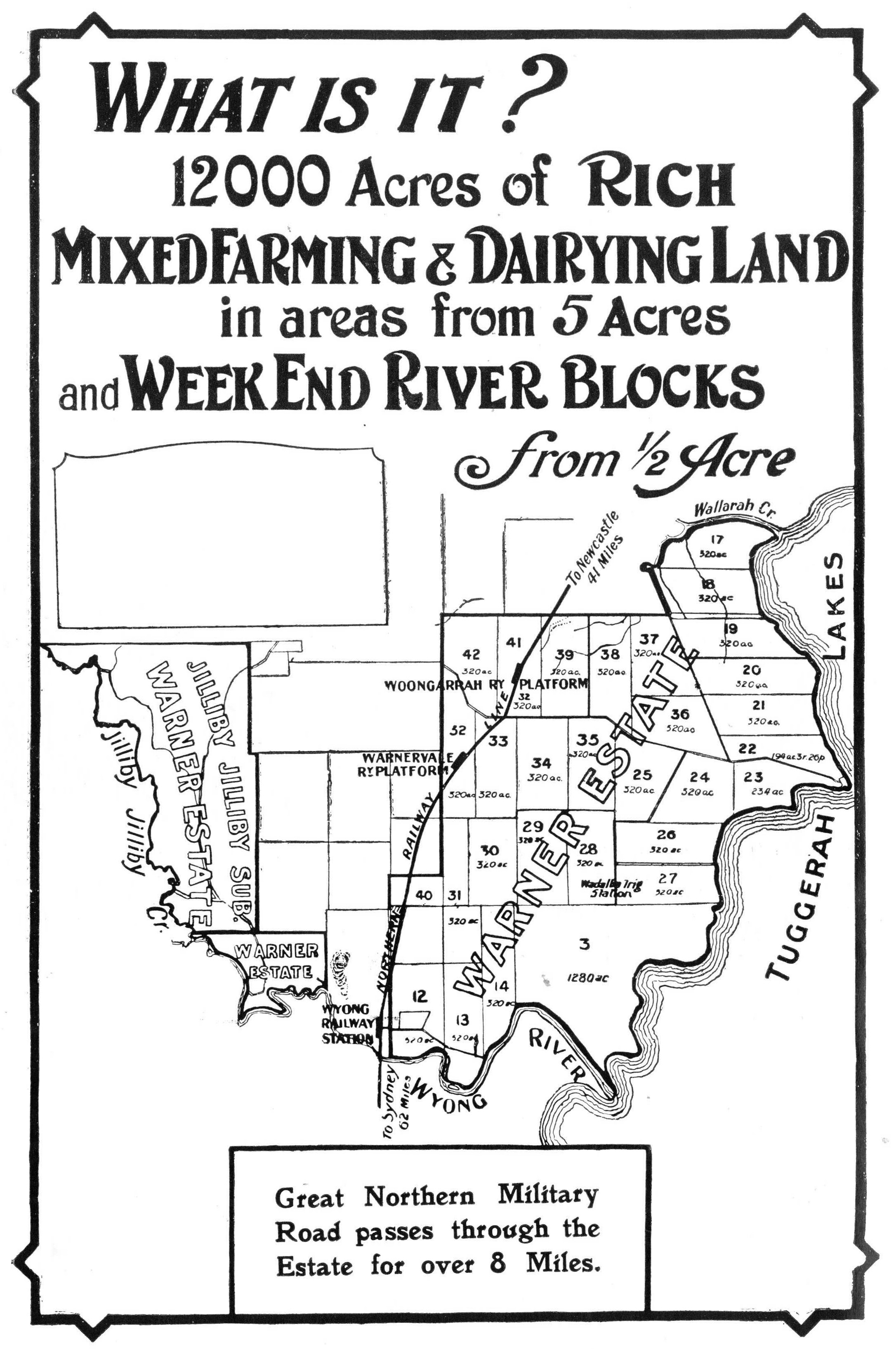
In 1915, Albert Hamlyn Warner and his son Leslie advertised land in the region for sale. The railway platform is labelled "Warnervale".

For thousands of years, aboriginal people occupied the land. Aboriginal land rights in the region are now administered by the Darkinjung Land Council.

Land in the region was granted to schoolmaster William Cape in 1825. An injury in 1828 caused him to retire to Sydney. His son William Timothy Cape had his own land grant at "Wyong Place", although his role as headmaster of Sydney College and later as a member of the New South Wales Legislative Assembly kept him from spending much time on this property.

William Cape grazed cattle and planted wheat, corn and potatoes. Cape was hostile to the local Aboriginal people. A report in 1828 said that local Aboriginal people had been taking Cape's corn, and Cape responded by shooting them. Violence escalated, and a group of 200 Aboriginal people assembled and confronted Cape. The local magistrate Willoughby Bean blamed Cape for provoking them.

In 1875, the land was purchased by William Alison, whose homestead became the site of the current Wyong District Museum, in Wyong.

Warnervale is named after Albert Hamlyn Warner who in 1893 acquired 12,000 acres (49 km^{2}) of land in the area. Warner was strongly influenced by his travels in Japan and his son Leslie's trip to the United States, which is today evidenced in road names in surrounding suburbs such as Minnesota, Virginia, Louisiana, Hiawatha and Nikko. His family home 'Hakone', located on the Wyong river, was named after a park he had seen in Japan.

Warnervale railway station was opened in 1907. Warnervale was gazetted as a village in 1975, and the suburb boundaries were defined in 1991. In 1998, the suburb was divided, creating Halloran, Wallarah, Woongarrah and Hamlyn Terrace.

Once composed of large acreages and significant wetlands, the area has rapidly been developed into a series of residential estates.

=== Warnervale Airport controversy ===
Controversy arose over plans which had originated in the late 1970s to convert the small Warnervale Airport into a commercial and freight airport and regional hub, expected in 1995 to operate 24 hours a day and cater for 65,000 flights annually - even as the state's property development agency, Landcom, was advertising estates in the area as "tranquil". The upgrade was expected in 1994 to cost A$6 million, and a proposal by Traders Finance Australia to develop the airport was accepted in January 1995, with contracts being signed in July 1995. Residents responded by forming the Central Coast Airport Action Group, and taking the Wyong Shire Council to the Land and Environment Court to fight the move. The action failed, and Wyong Shire Council demanded payment of costs from the residents group. However, the State Government intervened, passing the Warnervale Airport (Restrictions) Act 1996, which restricted future aircraft movements, the length and siting of the runway, and any future expansion of airport operations, and compensating residents for $65,000 in legal bills. In 1999, the Wyong Shire Council proposed extending the runway to 1600 metres to cater for jet aircraft of between 50 and 116 passengers, but the plans were eventually scrapped in a council meeting in February 2003 which decided instead to focus on job creation as a driver for the area's growth, including assisting the establishment of a $100 million distribution centre for Woolworths Group on part of the land initially earmarked for the airport upgrade.

== Future developments ==
Planning began in 2000 for a commercial development in Woongarrah, adjacent to the railway, termed Warnervale Town Centre. Woolworths Group proposed to build a new shopping centre, and a railway station was planned. A road was constructed to the proposed site (Woongarrah Road), but as of 2022, work on the shopping centre has not yet begun. New plans call for a scaled-down shopping centre, and there is no longer a plan to build a railway station.

== Facilities ==
Warnervale Public School was built at 75 Warnervale Rd in 1953. In 2008, the school was moved to Hamlyn Terrace, retaining the Warnervale name. Following population growth in the area, the site of the old school was repurchased by the New South Wales Government, and a new school, called Porters Creek Public School, was opened there in 2022. A number of other schools have been erected in the area, including MacKillop Catholic College and Lakes Grammar, to service the high youth population.

Warnies Cafe operates in a heritage-listed building next to the railway station. The building was previously used as a private residence and general store.

== Sport ==
Warnervale Wildcats Sport Club offers sporting activities for junior and seniors in rugby union, netball and cricket.

== Transport ==
Warnervale train station lies on the Main North railway line. It is served by the Central Coast & Newcastle Line of the NSW TrainLink network, allowing transport between Newcastle and Sydney.

== Notable residents ==
In 1988–9, American actor Matthew McConaughey resided in Warnervale for one year on exchange.
