= Lake Haven =

Coordinates: 33°14′24″S 151°30′04″E

- Suburb
- Interactive map of Lake Haven
- Country: Australia
- State: New South Wales
- City: Central Coast
- LGA: Central Coast Council
- Location: 18 km (11 mi) N of The Entrance; 11 km (6.8 mi) NE of Wyong; 53 km (33 mi) SW of Newcastle; 33 km (21 mi) NNE of Gosford; 106 km (66 mi) NNE of Sydney

Government
  - State electorate: Wyong
  - Federal division: Shortland

Area
  - Total: 1.7 km^{2} (0.66 sq mi)
- Elevation: 17 m (56 ft)

Population
  - Total: 3,578 (2016 census)
  - Density: 2,100/km^{2} (5,450/sq mi)
- Postcode: 2263
- Parish: Munmorah
Suburbs around Lake Haven
	Charmhaven
Charmhaven	Lake Haven	Budgewoi Lake
Kanwal	Gorokan

Lake Haven is a lakeside suburb near Wyong on the NSW Central Coast and is located about 12 kilometres (7.5 mi) north east of the Wyong town centre. It is about 102 km (63 mi) north of Sydney and 53 km (33 mi) south of Newcastle. There is a local shopping and commercial centre that serves the district, with schools and all normal community facilities being available. Rail connections are available in Wyong and at Warnervale, where there is a connection to the M1 (Sydney to Newcastle) freeway.
