= Colongra =

- Suburb
- Coordinates: 33°12′25″S 151°32′35″E
- Country: Australia
- State: New South Wales
- City: Central Coast
- LGA: Central Coast Council
- Location: 18 km (11 mi) NE of Wyong

Government
  - State electorate: Swansea
  - Federal division: Shortland
- Postcode: 2262
- Parish: Munmorah

Colongra is a suburb of the Central Coast region of New South Wales, Australia, on the banks of Lake Munmorah. It is part of the Central Coast Council local government area.

At the 2021 Australian census the population of Colongra was recorded as zero. Most of the land is enclosed for Colongra Power Station, the former Munmorah Power Station, and associated infrastructure. Colongra Lake (the ash dam for Munmorah Power Station) and Colongra Swamp Nature Reserve occupy the north and east part of the suburb.
