= Wyong, New South Wales =

Wyong
- Town
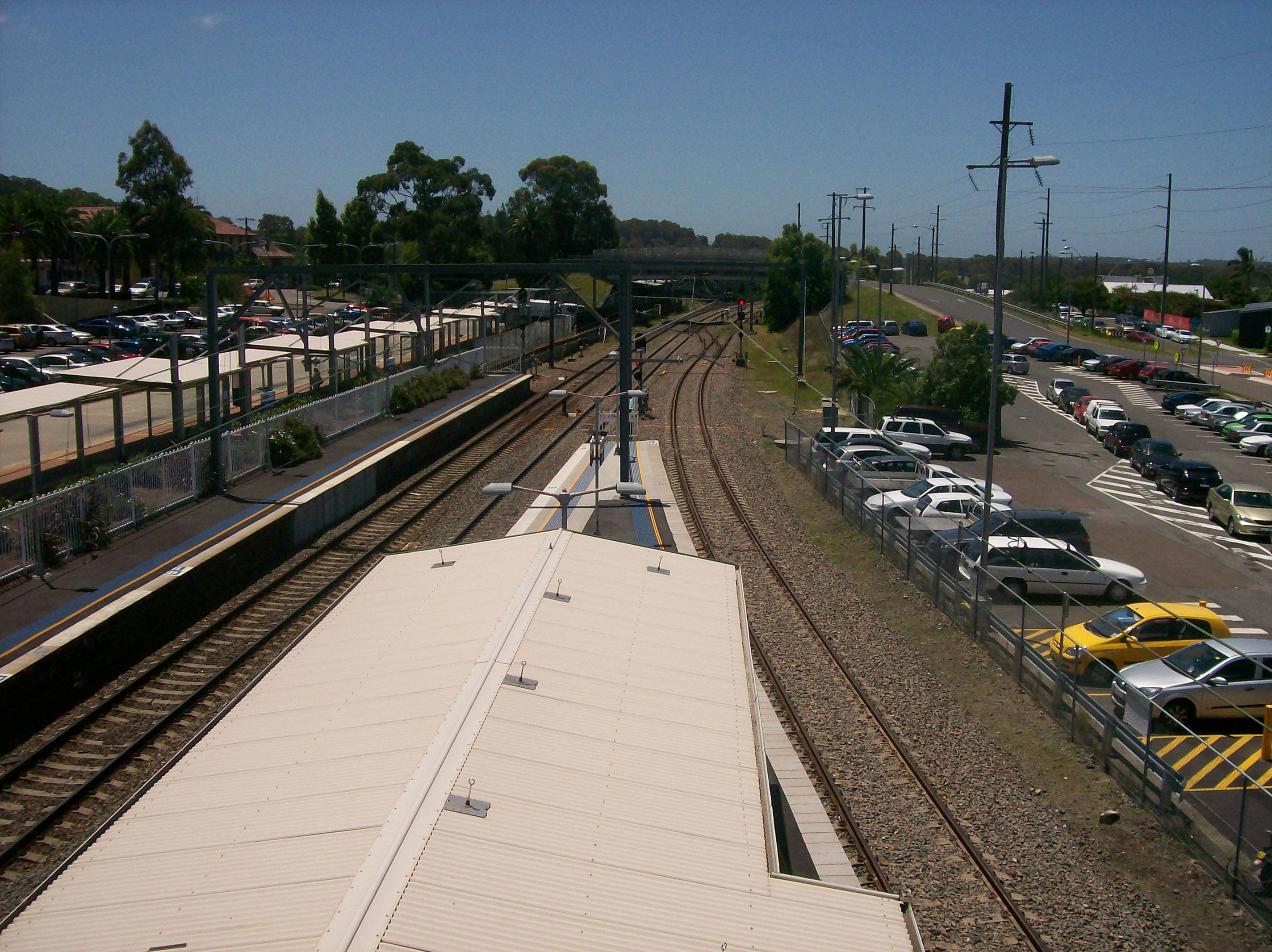
- Wyong railway station

- Coordinates: 33.282°S 151.418°E
- Country: Australia
- State: New South Wales
- City: Central Coast
- LGA: Central Coast Council
- Location: 21 km (13 mi) NNE of Gosford; 63 km (39 mi) SSW of Newcastle; 821 km (510 mi) SSW of Brisbane; 93 km (58 mi) NNE of Sydney; 16 km (9.9 mi) NW of The Entrance

Government
  - State electorate: Wyong
  - Federal division: Dobell

Area
  - Total: 9 km^{2} (3.5 sq mi)
- Elevation: 22 m (72 ft)

Population
  - Total: 4,530 (2021 census)
  - Density: 503/km^{2} (1,300/sq mi)
- Postcode: 2259
- Parish: Munmorah
Localities around Wyong
Watanobbi	Warnervale, Watanobbi	Wadalba
Alison	Wyong	Tacoma
Mardi	Tuggerah	Tacoma South

Wyong (/ˈwaɪɒŋ/) is a town on the Central Coast of New South Wales, Australia. It is located approximately 63 km (39 mi) South-South-West of Newcastle and 93 km (58 mi) North-North-East of the state capital Sydney. Established in 1888, it is one of the two administrative centres for the Central Coast Council local government area.

== History ==
Wyong is an Indigenous word meaning either "an edible yam" or "place of running water". William Cape was the first European settler to settle in the area and bring cattle and sheep into the district, on a 1,000 acres (4 km^{2}) land grant bordering Jilliby Creek in 1825. Cape had two sons who also held land grants.

=== Historical sites ===
- Alison Homestead, Cape Road, Wyong, built by Charles Alison, c. 1885; destroyed by arson on 3 December 2011.
- Chapmans Store, Cnr Alison Road & Hely Street, Wyong, opened in 1901.
- Court House, Alison Road, Wyong, built in 1924. This building is built on the site of the first Post Office which opened in 1892.
- St Cecilia's Church, Byron Street, Wyong. Built in 1908, it is the oldest church in Wyong and is still in use today.
- Strathavon resort, Boyce Avenue, Wyong. Dates from 1912 to 1913, formerly known as Hakone.
- Turreted buildings, Cnr Church Street, Wyong. Built by Albert Hamlyn Warner, 1915.
- Wyong Public School, Alison Road, Wyong. Built in 1889 and last used as school in September 1979.
- Wyong Milk Factory, 141 Alison Road, Wyong, c. 1921.

=== Wyong Plaza Work-In ===
In May 1974, 67 BLF-affiliated construction workers at the shopping centre construction site responded to the dismissal of a labourer by announcing from the jib of the crane that they would remain there until the job was reopened for all workers. They practiced workers' control for 6 six weeks and only ended after the company agreed to generous allowances and conditions, including the right of workers to be consulted on "hire and fire" decisions.

== Demographics ==
According to the 2021 census, there were 4,530 people in the suburb of Wyong:

- Aboriginal and Torres Strait Islander people made up 6.3% of the population.
- 73.8% of people were born in Australia. The next most common country of birth was England at 3.3%.
- 81.2% of people spoke only English at home.
- The most common responses for religion were no religion (36.6%), Catholic (19.2%) and Anglican (17.2%).

The broader Wyong regional area, encompassing the Central Coast’s northeast, had a population of 168,171.

== Facilities ==
Wyong has an efficient and compact town centre, housing one of the two Central Coast Councils Chambers, Village Central Wyong Shopping Centre, Hunter and Central Coast Institute of TAFE Wyong Campus, Wyong Police Station, Wyong Local Court House, The Art House Wyong Performing Arts and Conference Centre, and banks, government offices, local businesses and community services. Wyong Public School is located on Cutler Drive, north of the town centre. Wyong High School is west of the town centre on Alison Road.

Wyong Racecourse is an important provincial track with weekly meetings. The town has extensive sport and leisure facilities.

Wyong Hospital is not located in the town; rather, it is located 8.6 km (5.3 mi) north east in Hamlyn Terrace.

== Transport ==
Wyong is the hub of transport services in the northern part of the Central Coast region. Wyong railway station is served by Sydney Trains services. Bus services are operated by Busways, Red Bus CDC NSW and Coastal Liner. The Pacific Highway passed through the town until bypassed in December 1983.

== Notable people ==
Notable people who are from or who have lived in Wyong include:

- Dale Buggins, motorcycle stunt rider
- Steve Carter, rugby league player
- Roy Ferguson, rugby league player
- Noel Miller, cricketer
- Mark Skaife, race car driver
- Jai Opetaia, professional boxer

== See also ==
- Tuggerah Lake for a map of locations near Wyong
