= Tuggerah railway station =

Railway station in New South Wales, Australia

Tuggerah
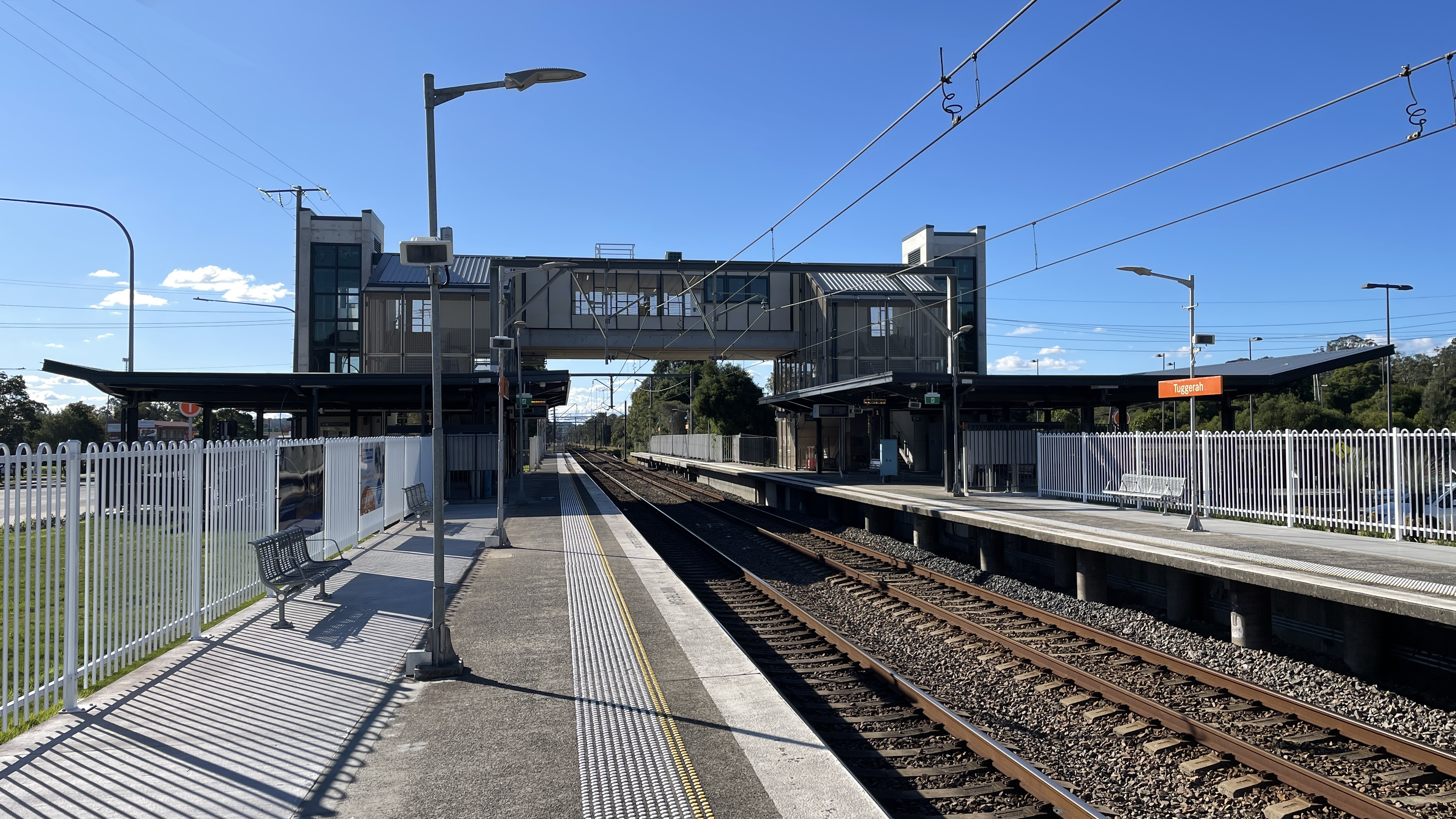
- Northbound on Platform 2, June 2025

General information
- Location: Old Pacific Highway, Tuggerah; Australia
- Coordinates: 33°18′27″S 151°25′13″E
- Elevation: 7 metres (23 ft)
- Owner: Transport Asset Manager of New South Wales
- Operator: Sydney Trains
- Line: Main Northern
- Distance: 98.54 km (61.23 mi) from Sydney Central
- Platforms: 2 side
- Tracks: 2
- Connections: Bus

Construction
- Structure type: Ground
- Accessible: Assisted access

Other information
- Status: Weekdays: Staffed: 4am to 8pm: Weekends and public holidays: Staffed: 6.30am to 6pm
- Station code: TGG
- Website: Transport for NSW

History
- Opened: 1890; 136 years ago
- Former names: Tuggerah Lakes (1890–1891)

Passengers
- 2025: 594,821 (year); 1,630 (daily) (Sydney Trains, NSW TrainLink)

Services
Preceding station	Intercity Trains	Following station
Wyong towards Newcastle Interchange	Central Coast & Newcastle Line	Ourimbah towards Central
Wyong towards Newcastle Interchange	Central Coast & Newcastle Line Express	Gosford towards Central
Location

Tuggerah railway station is located on the Main Northern line in New South Wales, Australia. It serves the northern Central Coast suburb of Tuggerah, opening in 1890 as Tuggerah Lakes. It was renamed Tuggerah on 1 January 1891. A pair of passing loops were added north of the station in 1948. These were removed in December 1995. The station was rebuilt in the 1990s.

In April 2025, an accessibility upgrade was completed, which involved the installation of lifts and a new footbridge linking the two platforms.

== Platforms and services ==
Tuggerah has two side platforms. It is serviced by Sydney Trains Intercity Central Coast & Newcastle Line with services travelling between Sydney Central, Wyong & Newcastle via Strathfield, as well as limited local services between Newcastle & Gosford. There are 3 weekday morning peak hour services from Wyong to Sydney Central via Gordon.

Platform	Line	Stopping pattern	Notes
1	CCN	Services to Gosford & Sydney Central via Strathfield	
1	CCN	3 Weekday morning peak hour services to Sydney Central via Gordon	
2	CCN	Services to Wyong & Newcastle	

Following Accessibility Upgrade

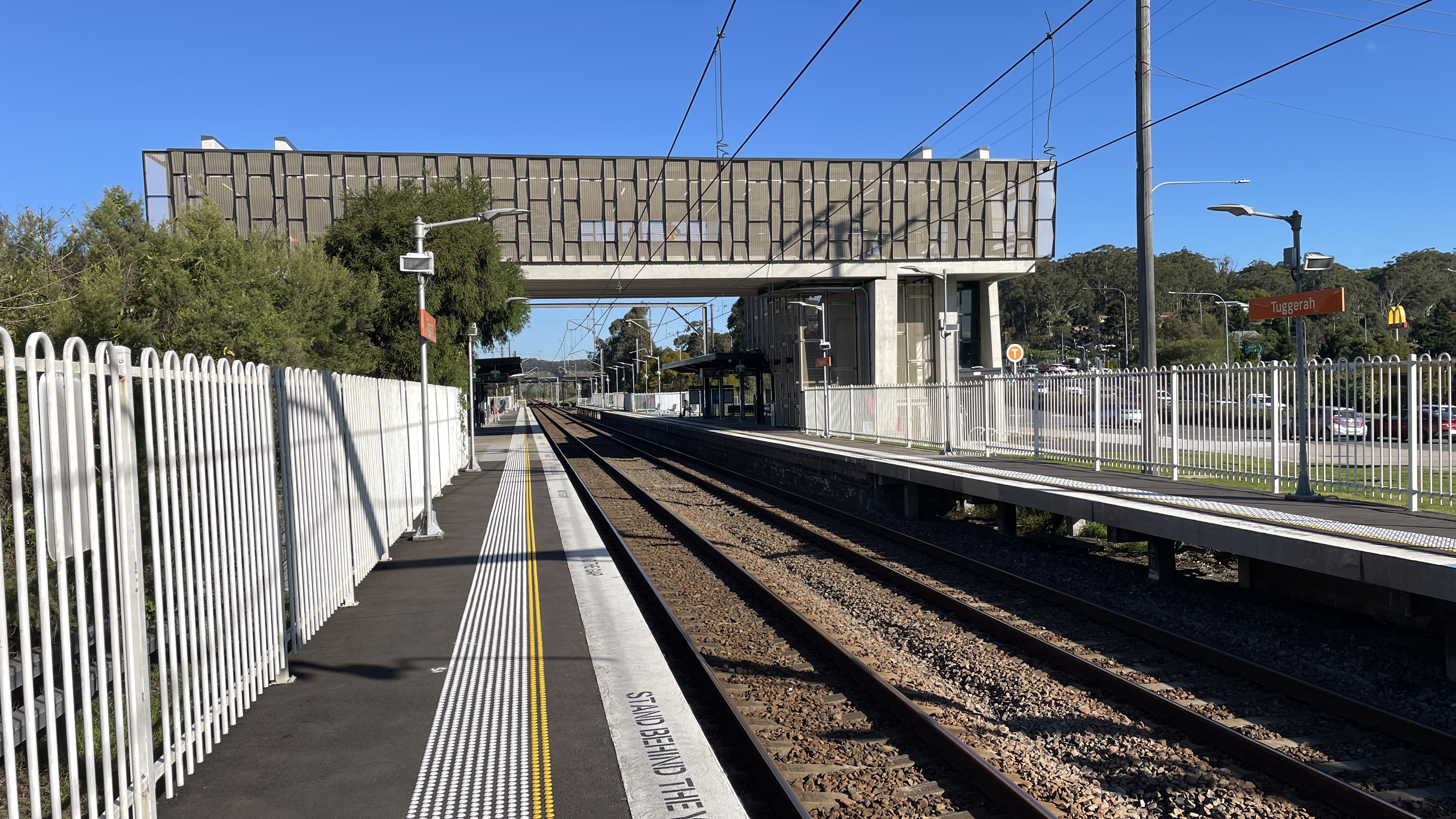
Southbound view on Platform 1

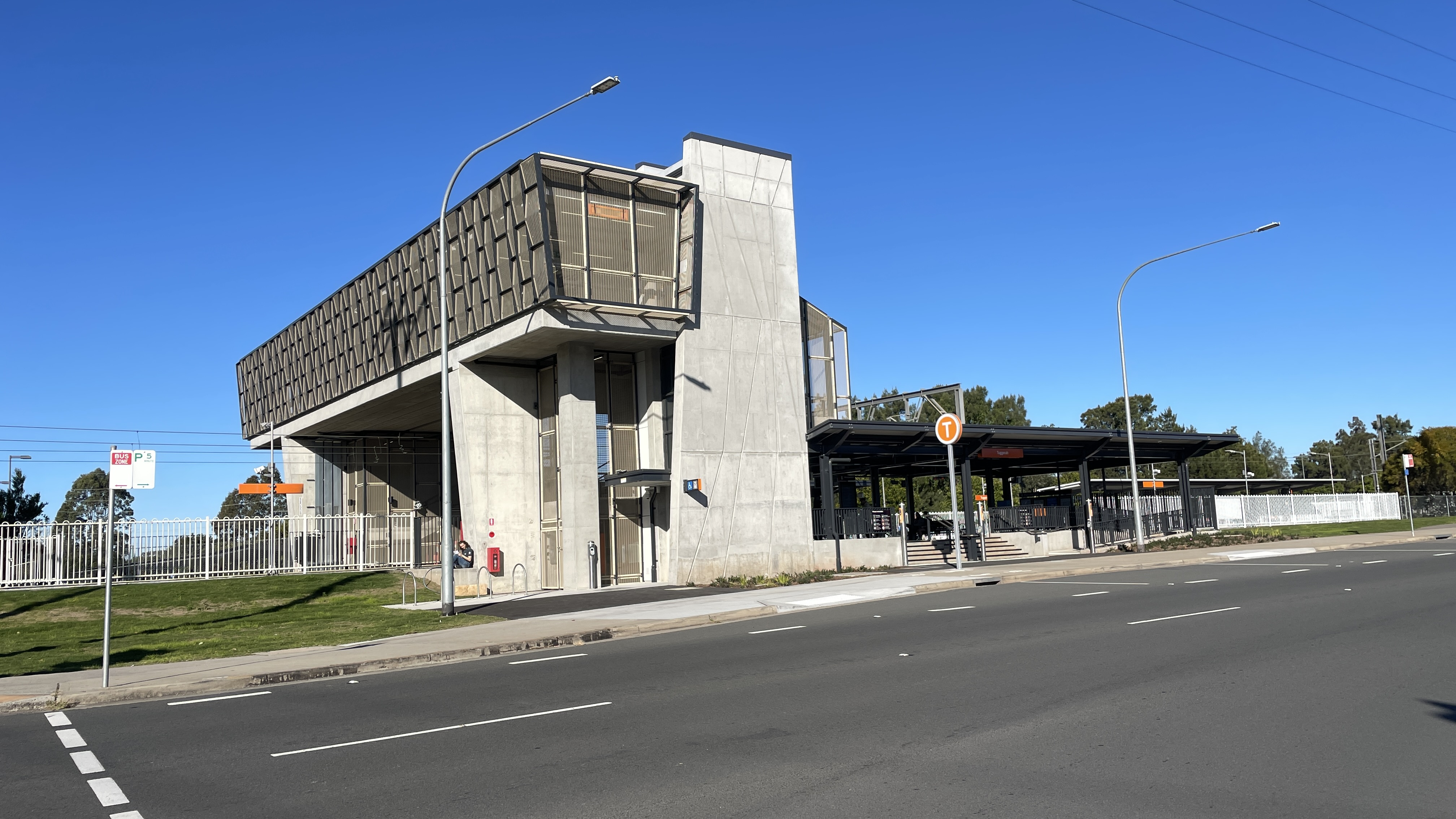
Entrance on Pacific Highway

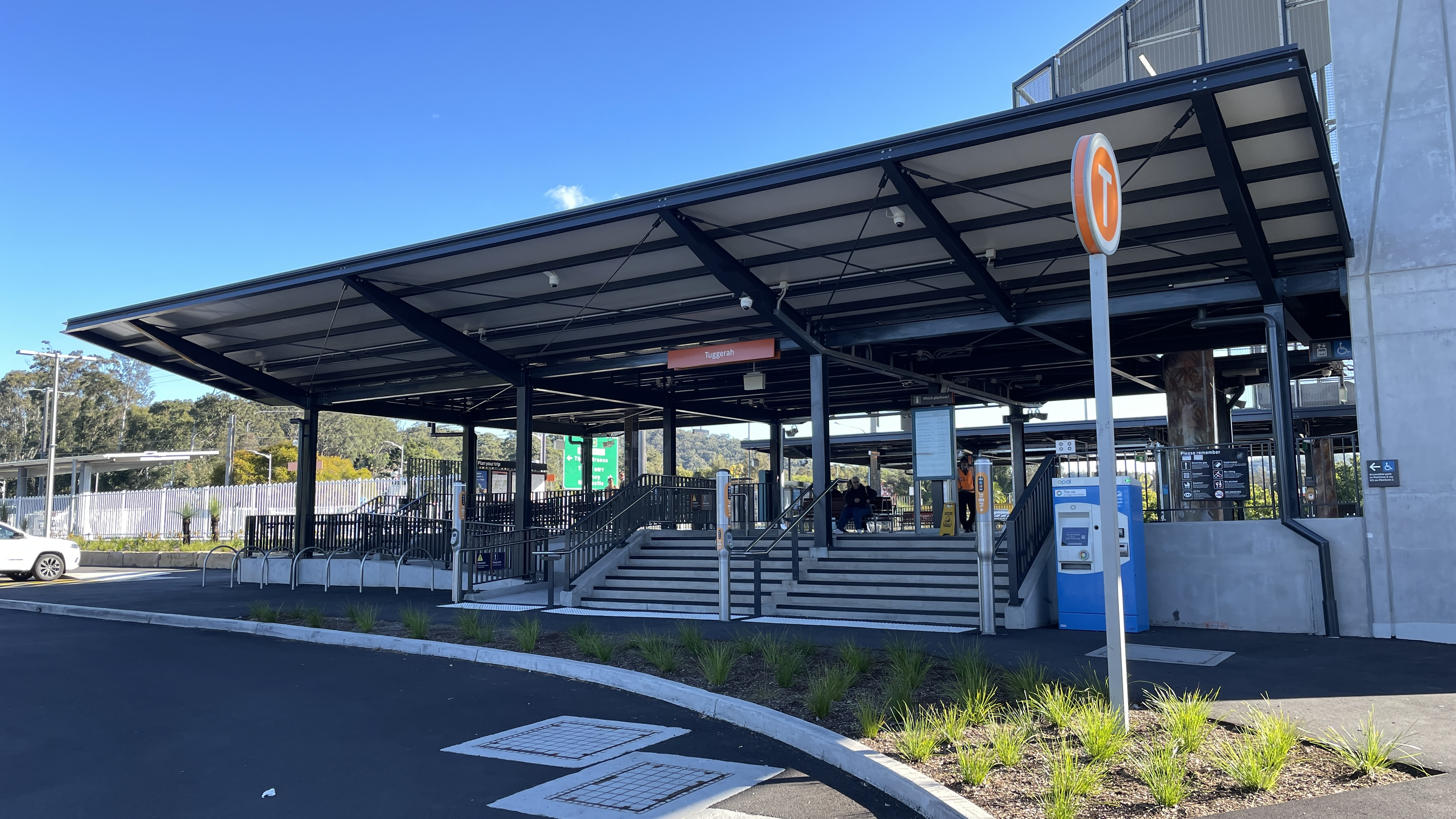
Entrance on Bryant Drive

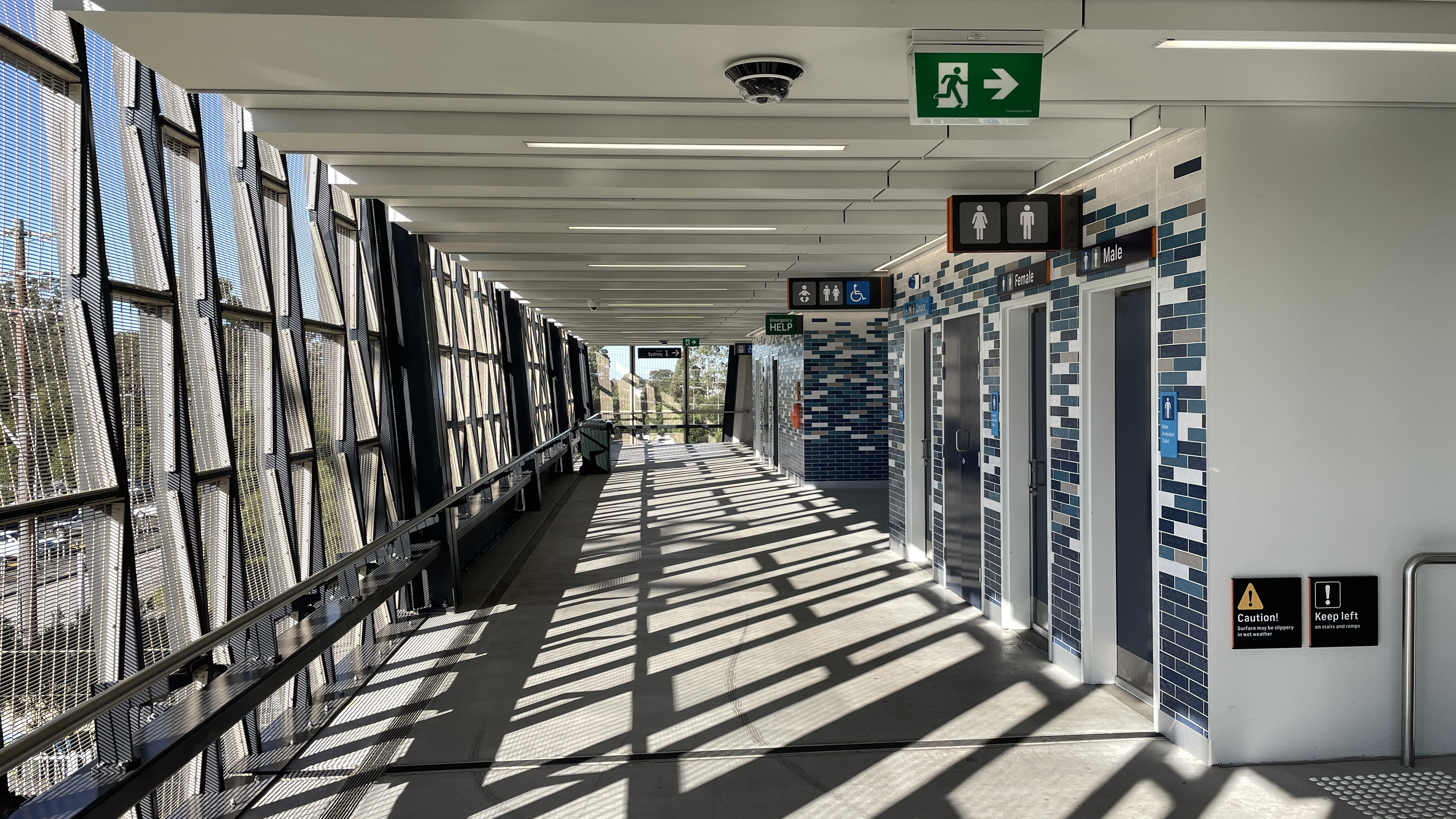
Footbridge concourse
Prior to Accessibility Upgrade

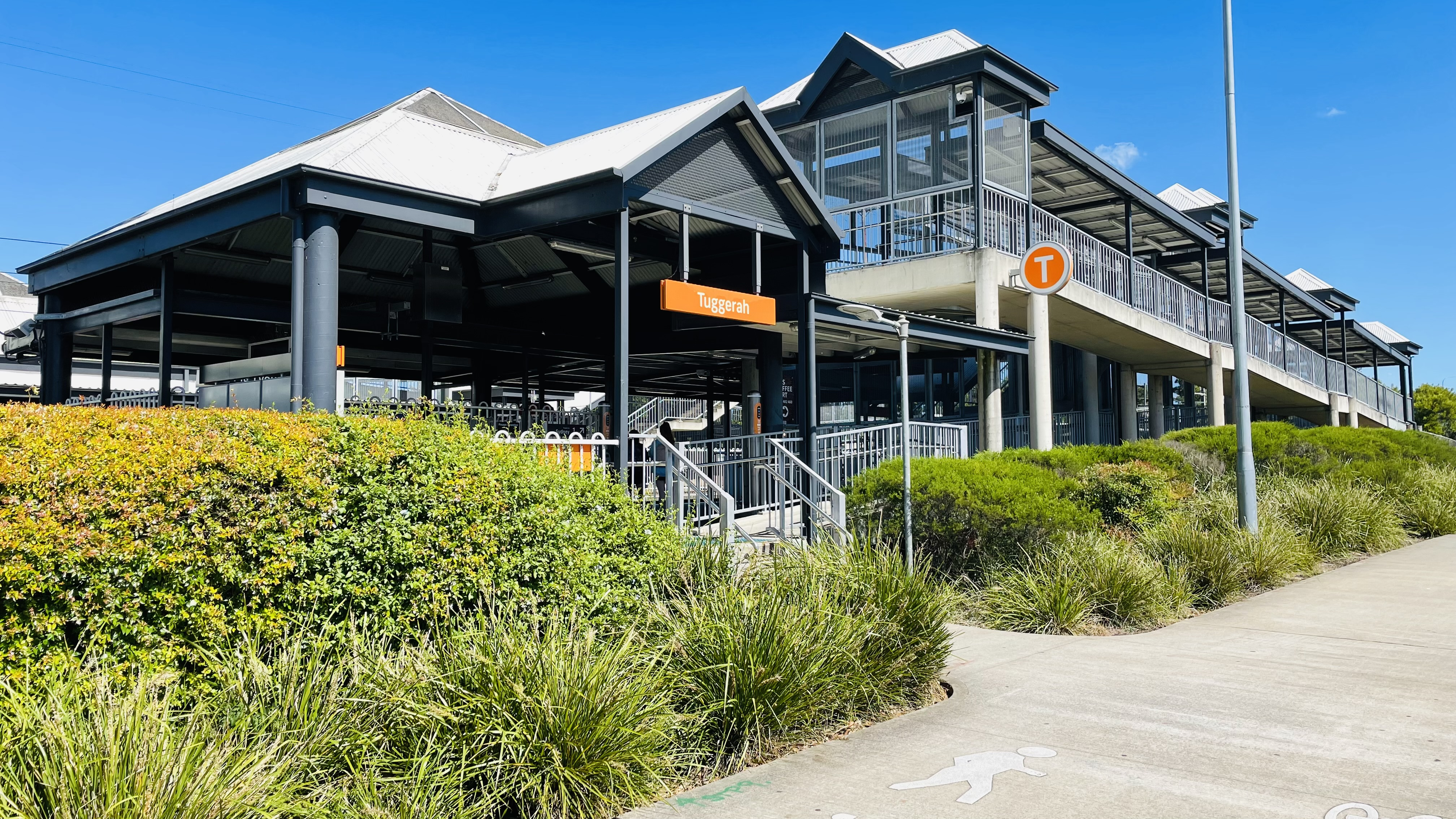
Entrance on Pacific Highway

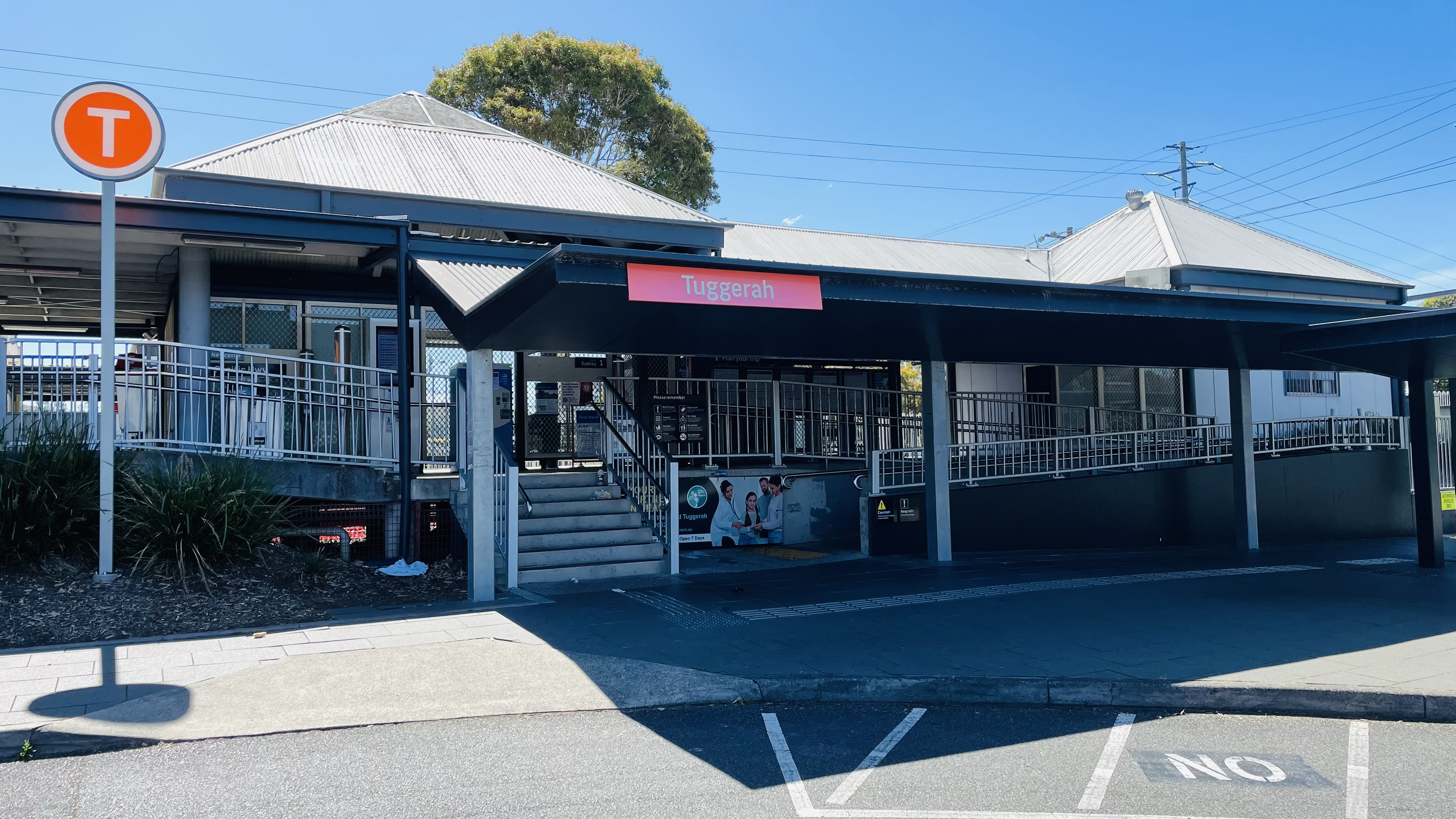
Entrance on Bryant Drive

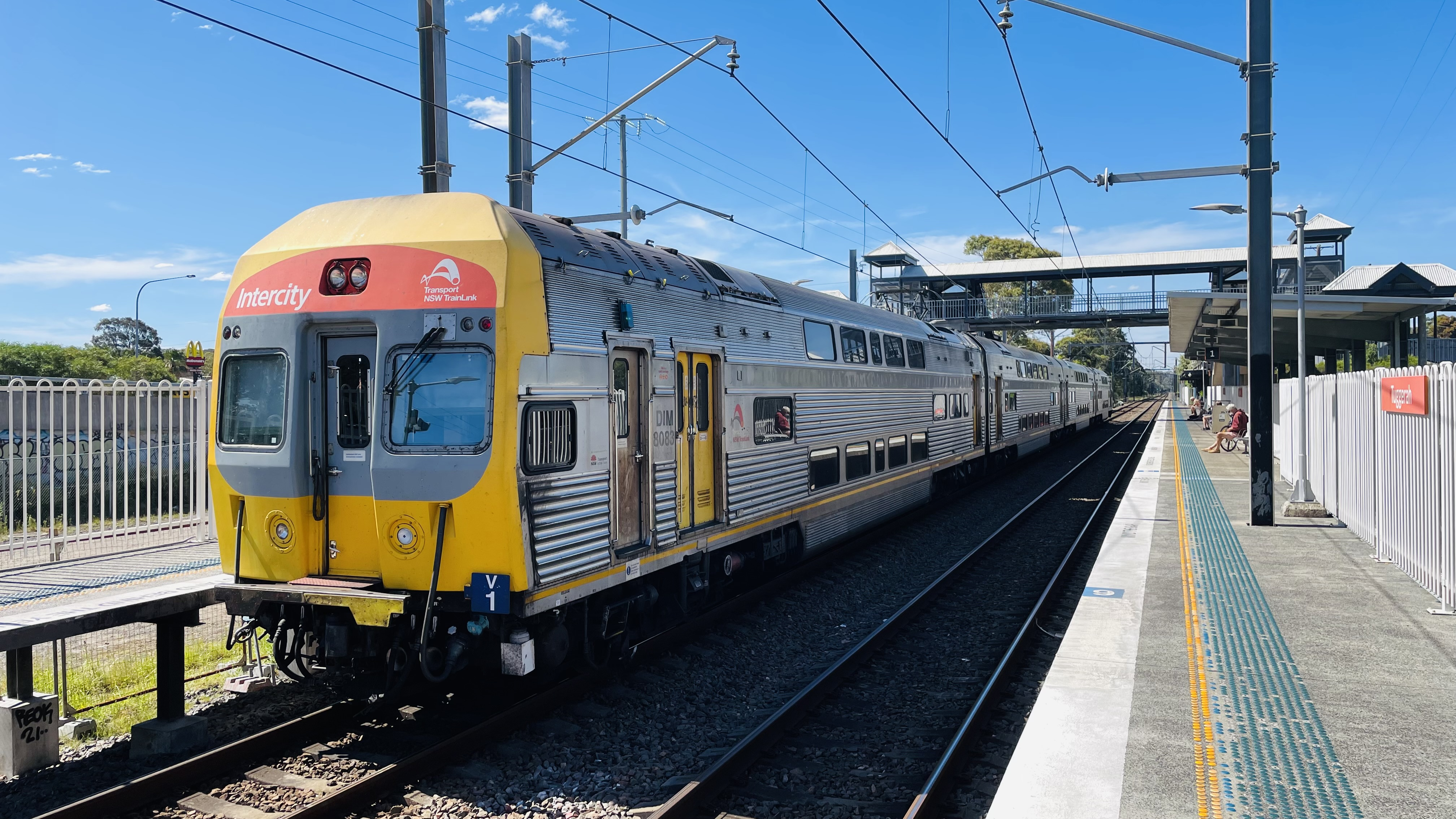
V Set on Platform 1

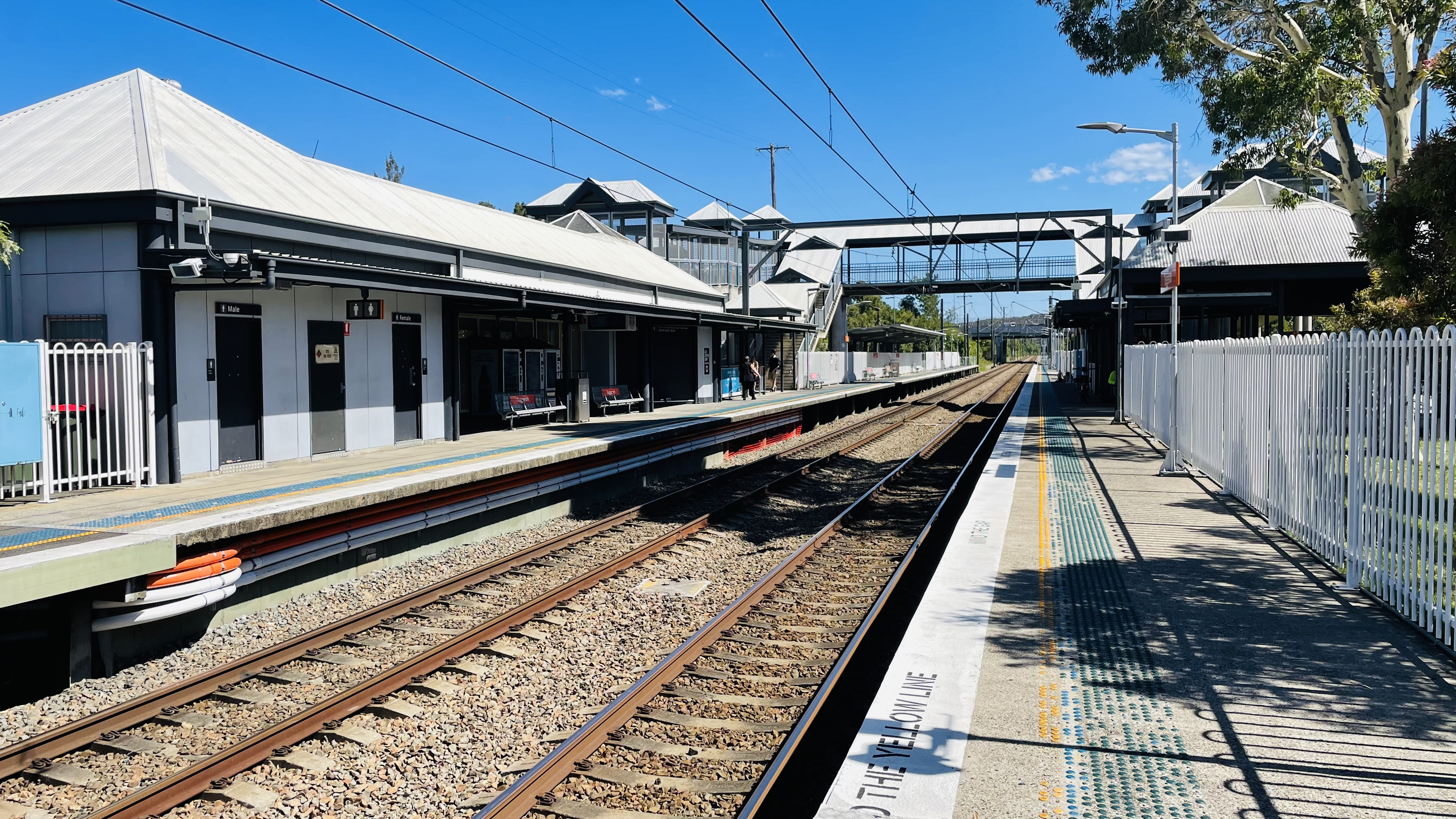
Southbound view on Platform 2

== Transport links ==
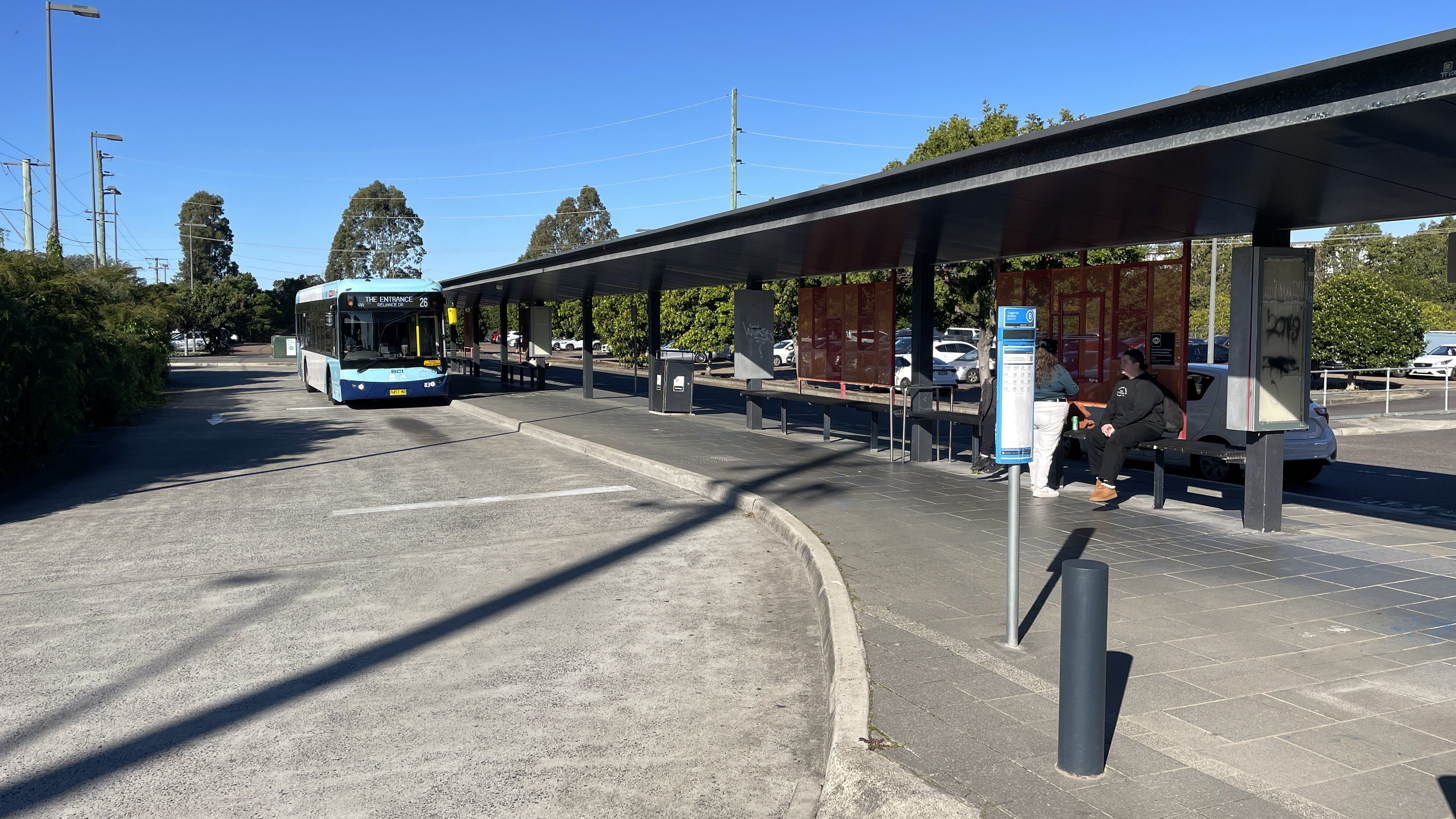
Bus Terminal

Busways operates seven bus routes via Wyong station, under contract to Transport for NSW:

- 78: Westfield Tuggerah to Lake Haven via Warnervale station
- 79: Westfield Tuggerah to Lake Haven via Watanobbi, Hamlyn Terrace & Woongarrah
- 80: Westfield Tuggerah to Lake Haven via Pacific Highway & Wyong Hospital
- 81: Westfield Tuggerah to Lake Haven via Johns Road Wadalba & Wyongah
- 82: Westfield Tuggerah to Lake Haven via Tacoma & Wyongah
- 93: Westfield Tuggerah to Noraville
- 94: Westfield Tuggerah to Budgewoi

Coastal Liner operates four bus routes via Tuggerah station, under contract to Transport for NSW:

- 10: Westfield Tuggerah to Warnervale station
- 11: to Westfield Tuggerah to Lake Haven
- 12: to Westfield Tuggerah to Durren Durren
- 13: to Westfield Tuggerah to Lemon Tree via Warnervale station

Red Bus Services operates seven bus routes via Tuggerah station, under contract to Transport for NSW:

- 15: Wyong to The Entrance
- 16: Wyong TAFE to The Entrance
- 19: Wyong to Gosford station via Bateau Bay
- 24: Wyong Hospital to The Entrance via Berkeley Vale & Glenning Valley (combined 25/26 service)
- 25: Wyong to The Entrance via Glenning Valley
- 26: Wyong Hospital to The Entrance via Berkeley Vale
- 47: Wyong to Bateau Bay
