= Point Clare railway station =

Railway station in New South Wales, Australia

Point Clare
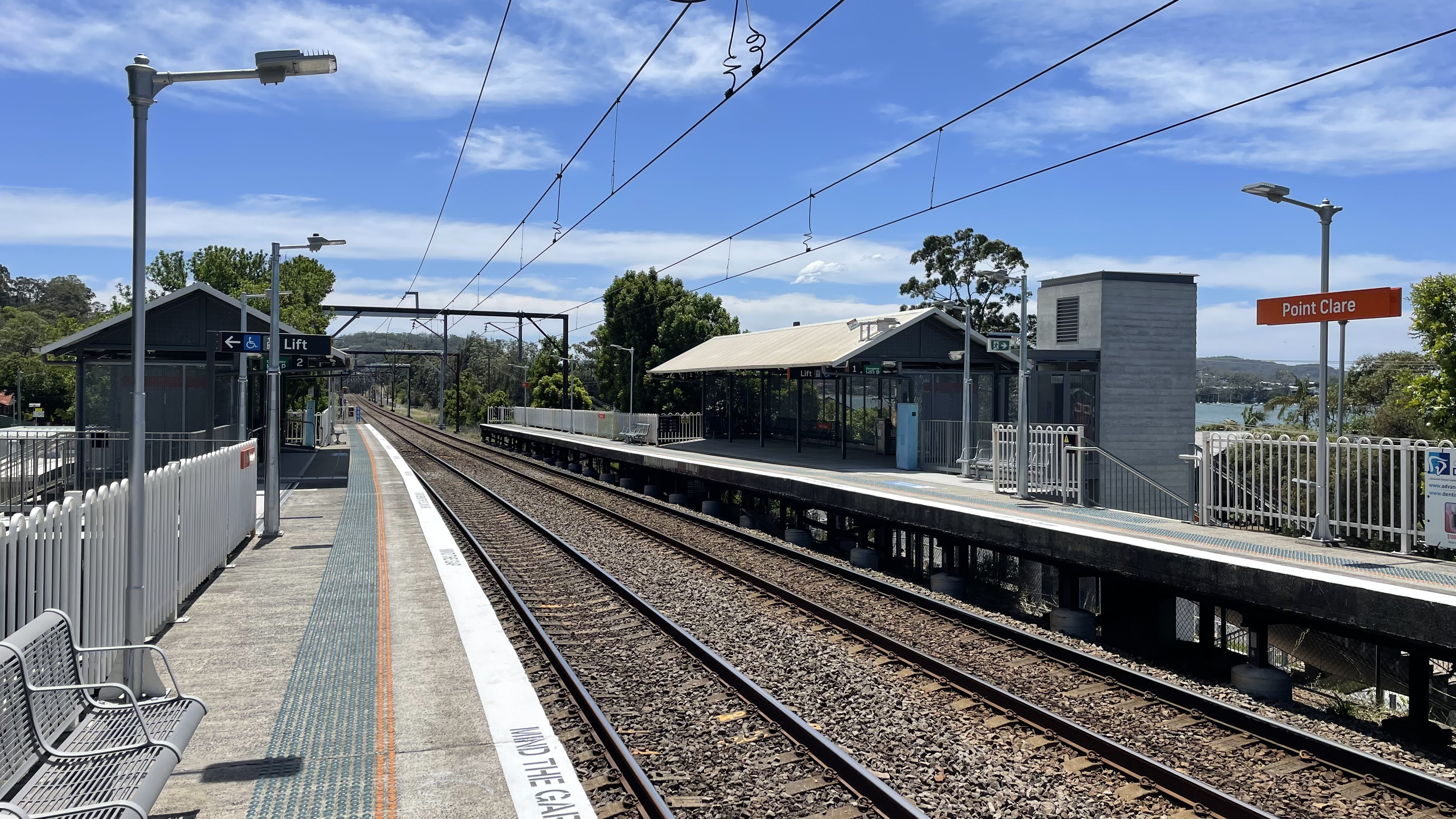
- Northbound view from Platform 2, October 2023

General information
- Location: Brisbane Water Drive, Point Clare; Australia
- Coordinates: 33°26′46″S 151°19′43″E
- Elevation: 9 metres (30 ft)
- Owner: Transport Asset Manager of New South Wales
- Operator: Sydney Trains
- Line: Main Northern
- Distance: 78.05 km (48.50 mi) from Sydney Central
- Platforms: 2 side
- Tracks: 2
- Connections: Bus

Construction
- Structure type: Ground
- Accessible: Yes

Other information
- Status: Weekdays: Staffed: 5:45am to 1:45am: Weekends and public holidays: Unstaffed
- Station code: PCL
- Website: Transport for NSW

History
- Opened: 28 June 1891; 135 years ago

Passengers
- 2025: 70,893 (year); 194 (daily) (Sydney Trains, NSW TrainLink)

Services
Preceding station	Intercity Trains	Following station
Gosford towards Newcastle Interchange	Central Coast & Newcastle Line	Tascott towards Central
Location

Point Clare railway station is located on the Main Northern line in New South Wales, Australia. It serves the southern Central Coast suburb of Point Clare opening on 28 June 1891.

== Platforms and services ==
Point Clare has two side platforms. It is serviced by Sydney Trains Intercity Central Coast & Newcastle Line with services travelling between Sydney Central, Gosford, Wyong & Newcastle via Strathfield. There are 3 weekday morning peak hour services from Wyong to Sydney Central via Gordon.

Platform	Line	Stopping pattern	Notes
1	CCN	Services to Sydney Central via Strathfield	
1	CCN	3 Weekday morning peak hour services to Sydney Central via Gordon	
2	CCN	Services to Gosford, Wyong & Newcastle	

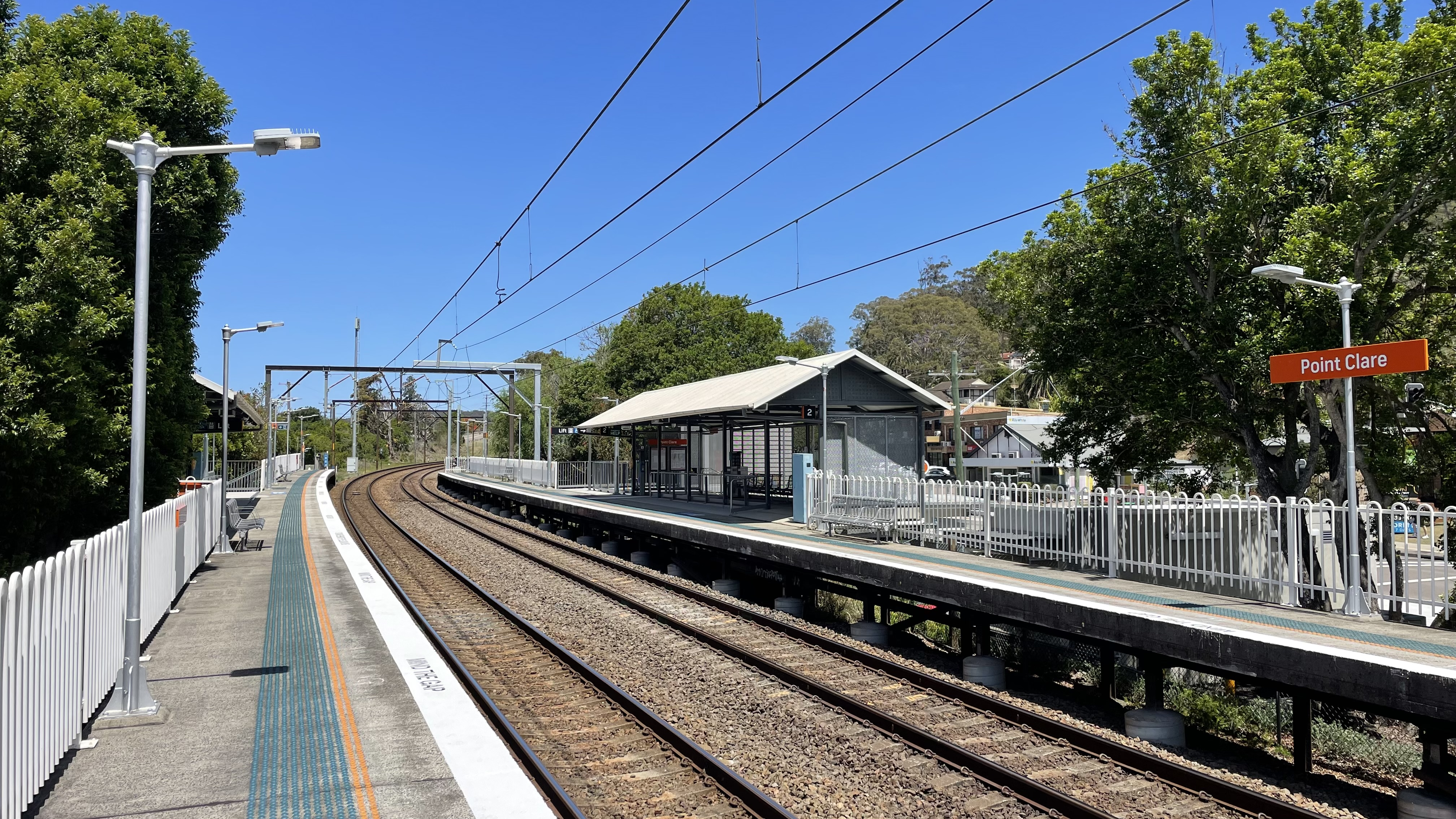
Southbound view on Platform 1

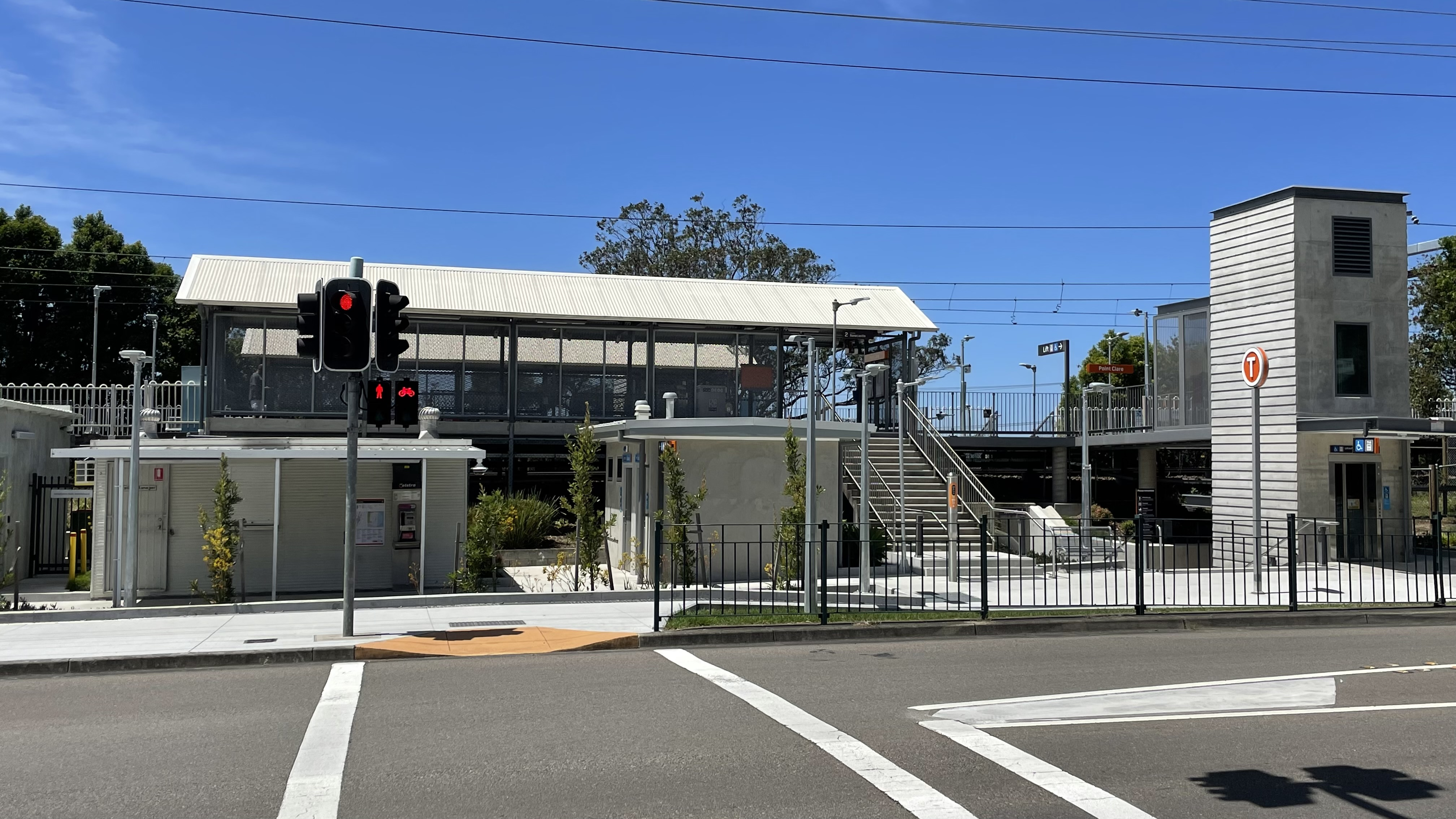
Entrance on Brisbane Water Drive

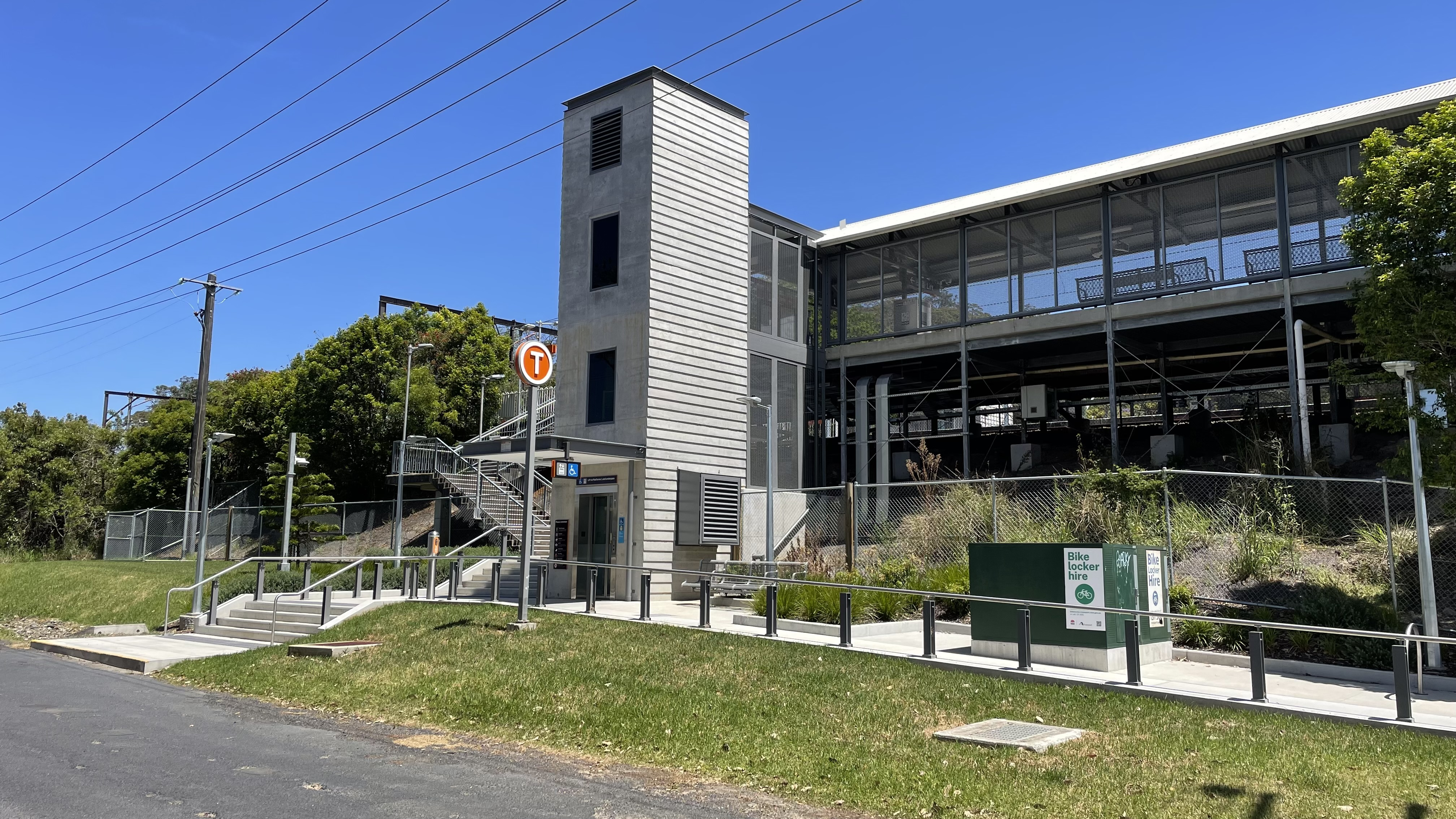
Entrance on Kurrawa Avenue

== Transport links ==
Busways operates two bus routes via Point Clare station, under contract to Transport for NSW:

- 55: Gosford station to Ettalong Beach
- 70: Gosford station to Ettalong Beach
