= Wyong railway station =

Railway station in New South Wales, Australia

Wyong
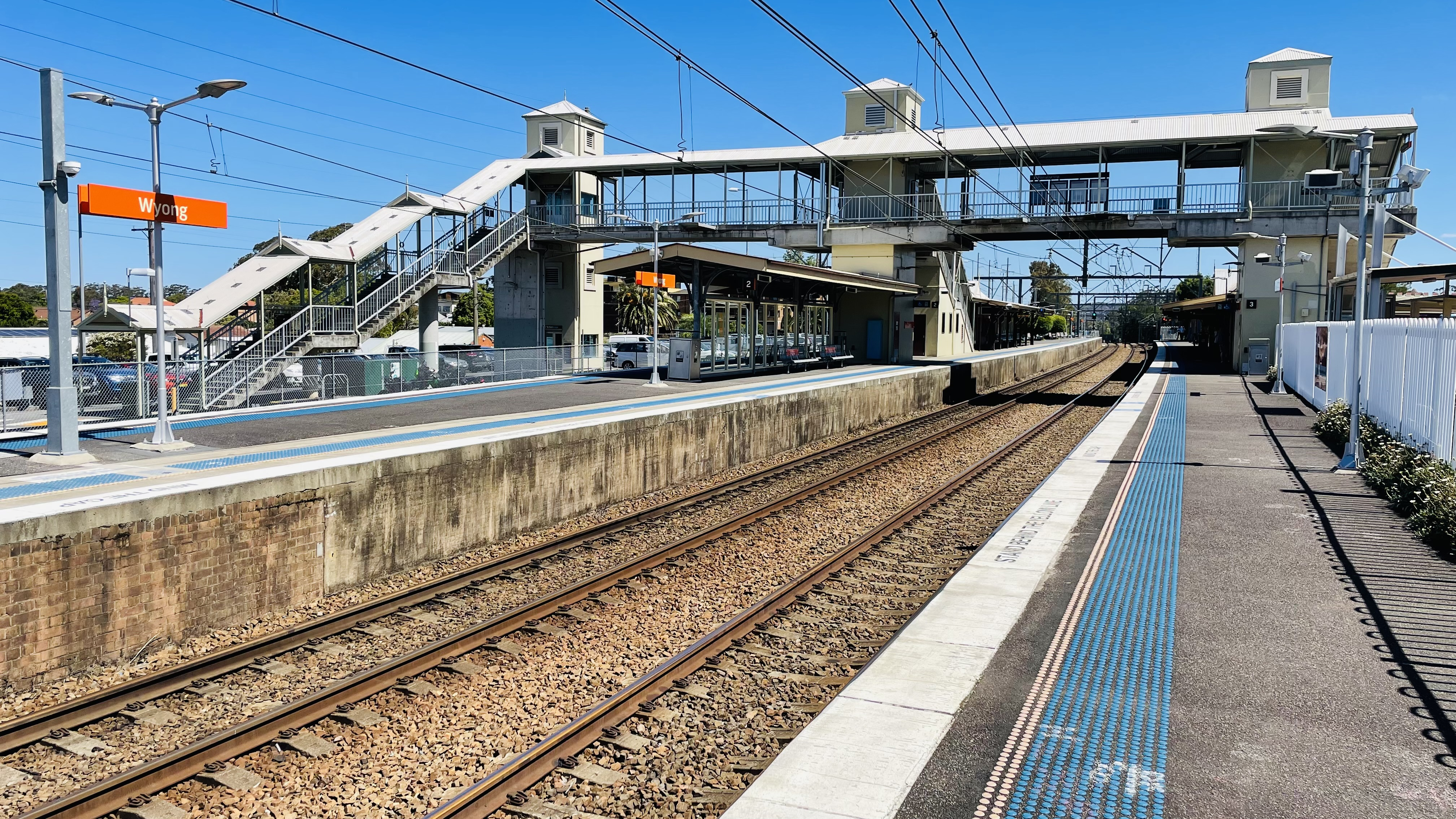
- Southbound view from Platform 3, November 2022

General information
- Location: Old Pacific Highway, Wyong; Australia
- Coordinates: 33°17′07″S 151°25′31″E
- Elevation: 17 metres (56 ft)
- Owner: Transport Asset Manager of New South Wales
- Operator: Sydney Trains
- Line: Main Northern
- Distance: 101.08 km (62.81 mi) from Sydney Central
- Platforms: 3 (1 island, 1 side)
- Tracks: 3
- Connections: Bus

Construction
- Structure type: Ground
- Accessible: Yes

Other information
- Status: Staffed
- Station code: WYG
- Website: Transport for NSW

History
- Opened: 15 August 1887; 139 years ago

Passengers
- 2025: 665,273 (year); 1,823 (daily) (Sydney Trains, NSW TrainLink)

Services
Preceding station	Intercity Trains	Following station
Warnervale towards Newcastle Interchange	Central Coast & Newcastle Line	Tuggerah towards Central
Morisset towards Newcastle Interchange	Central Coast & Newcastle Line Express	Tuggerah towards Central
Wyee Weekends only towards Newcastle Interchange	Central Coast & Newcastle Line Express	Tuggerah towards Central
Preceding station	NSW TrainLink	Following station
Fassifern towards Grafton, Casino or Brisbane	NSW TrainLink North Coast Line	Gosford towards Sydney
Fassifern towards Moree or Armidale	NSW TrainLink North Western Line	Gosford towards Sydney
Location

Wyong railway station is a heritage-listed railway station located on the Main Northern line in New South Wales, Australia. It serves the northern Central Coast town of Wyong.

== History ==
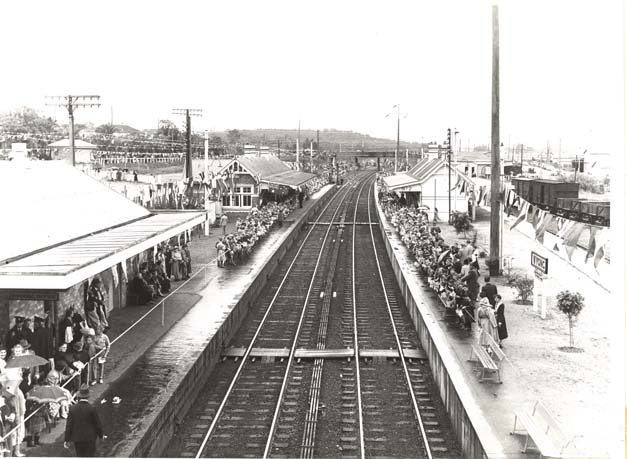
Wyong station in 1954. The crowd is awaiting the arrival of Queen Elizabeth II.

Wyong station was opened on 15 August 1887. In 1912, the line was duplicated. In 1937, the eastern platform was converted to an island platform. A pair of passing loops were added south of the station in 1948. In the 1950s, a new bridge was built over Wyong Creek immediately south of the station, with the old railway bridge becoming part of the Pacific Highway.

Between April 1982 and June 1984, Wyong was the northern extremity of the electrified network. A brick building on Platforms 1 and 2 was replaced by the current structure in the 1990s. On 1 November 1993, an upgraded footbridge with a new ticket office and lifts was opened by Minister for Transport Bruce Baird.

== Platforms and services ==
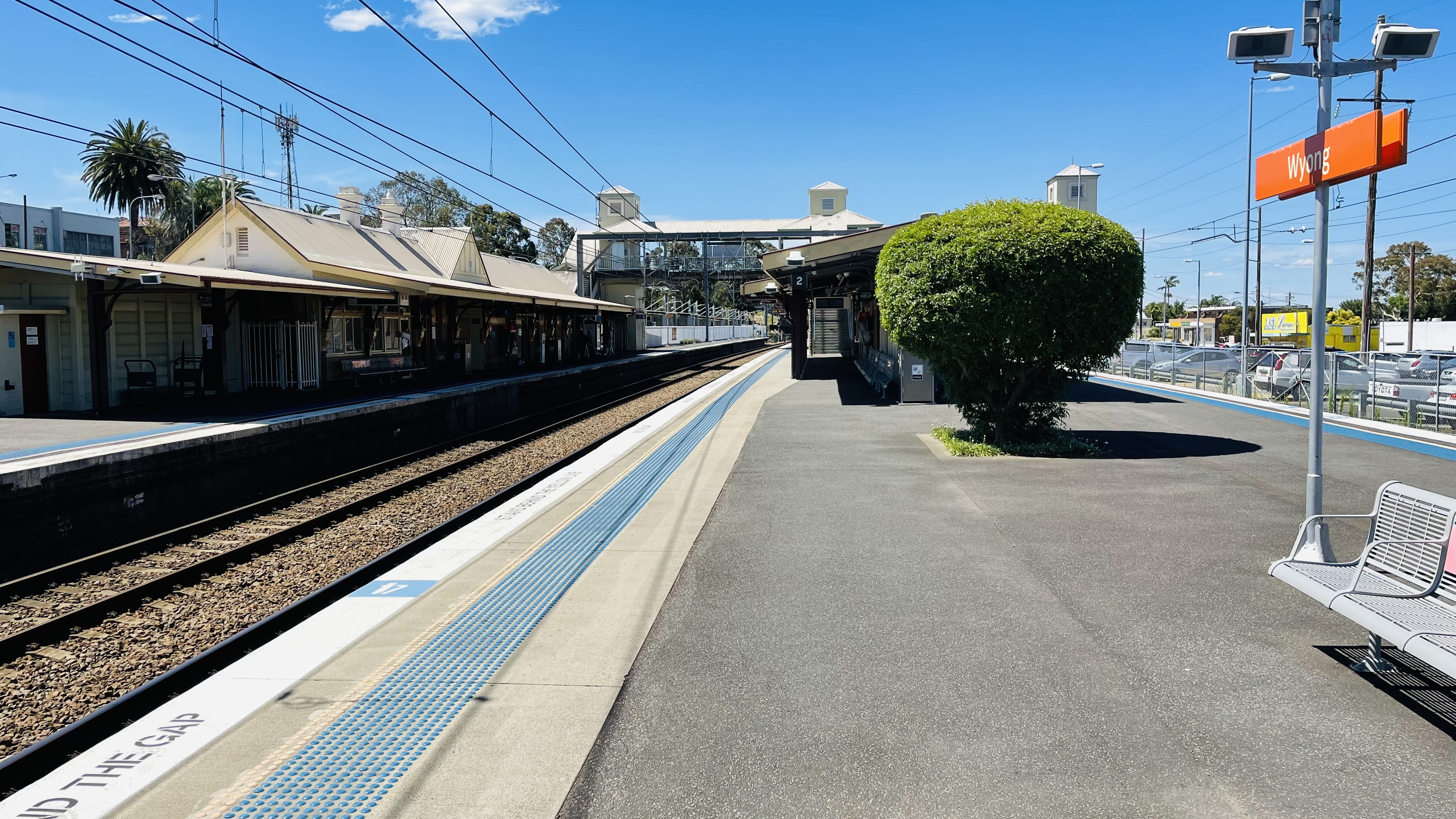
Northbound view from Platform 2

Wyong has three platforms, one island with two faces and one side platform. It is serviced by Sydney Trains Intercity Central Coast & Newcastle Line with services travelling between Sydney Central & Newcastle via Strathfield with some services terminating at Wyong, as well as limited local services between Newcastle & Gosford. There are 3 weekday morning and evening peak hour services that terminate at Wyong to and from Sydney Central via Gordon.

It is also serviced by NSW TrainLink Xplorer and XPT long-distance services between Sydney, Armidale, Moree, Casino and Brisbane.

Platform	Line	Stopping pattern	Notes
1	CCN	Terminating services to and from Gosford & Sydney Central via Strathfield	Weekday evening peak hour and weekends only
1	CCN	Terminating weekday peak hour services to and from Sydney Central via Gordon	Weekday morning and evening peak hour only
2	CCN	Services to Gosford & Sydney Central via Strathfield	
2	North Coast Region	Services to Sydney Central	Set down only
2	North Western Region	Services to Sydney Central	Set down only
3	CCN	Services to Newcastle	
3	North Coast Region	Services to Grafton, Casino & Brisbane	Pick up only
3	North Western Region	Services to Armidale & Moree	Pick up only

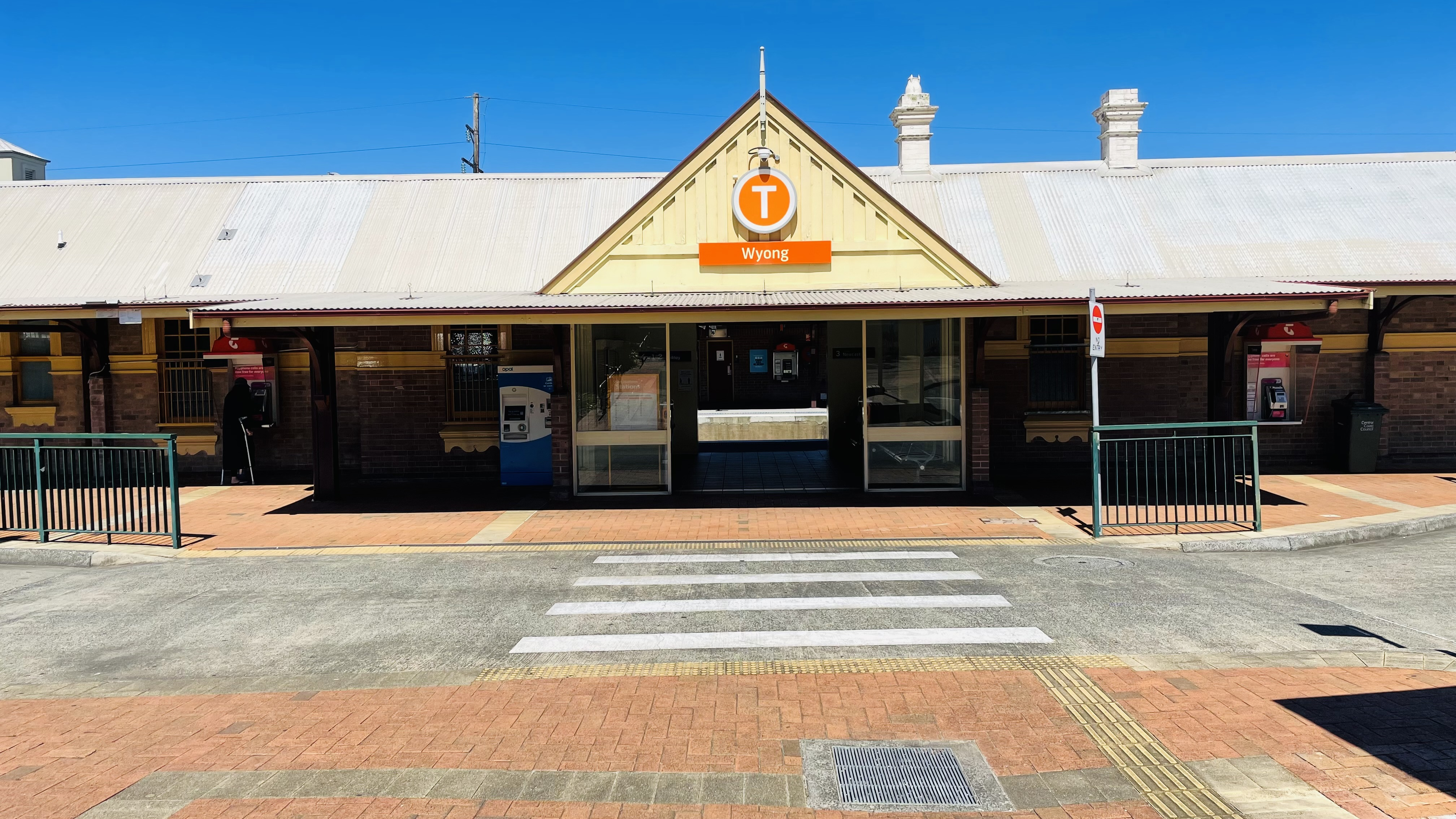
Pacific Highway Entrance

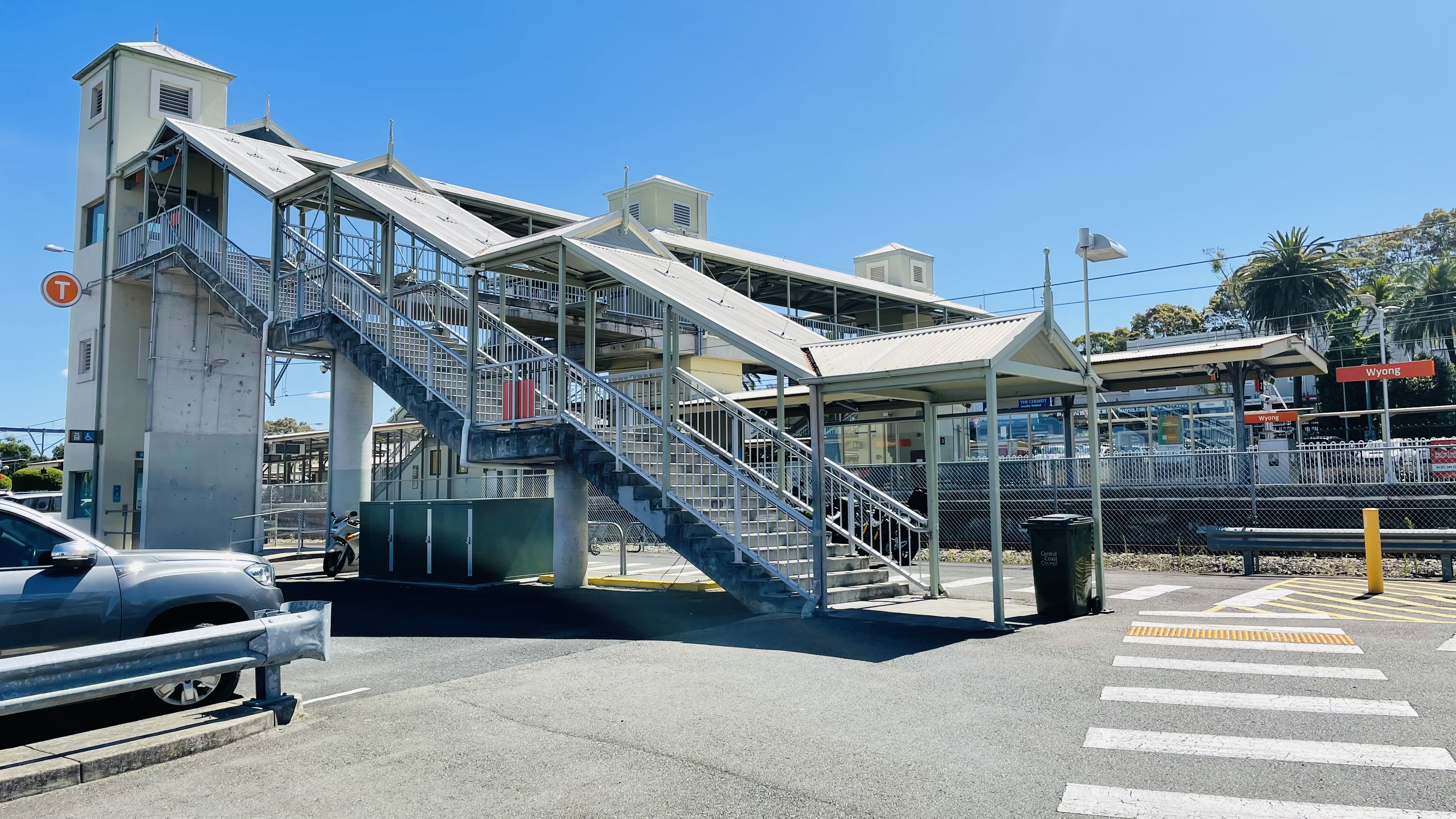
Howarth Street Entrance

== Transport links ==
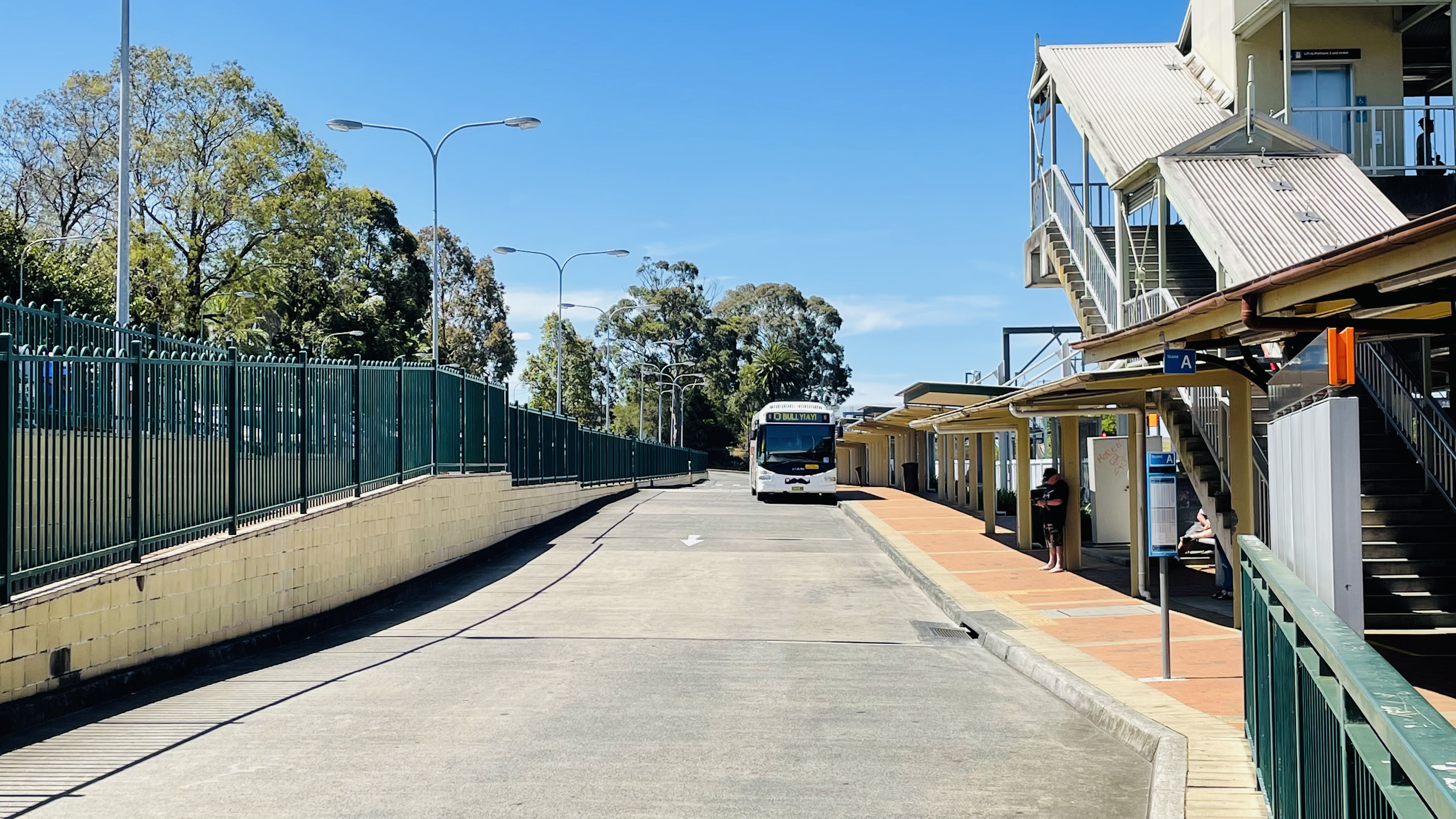
Bus interchange

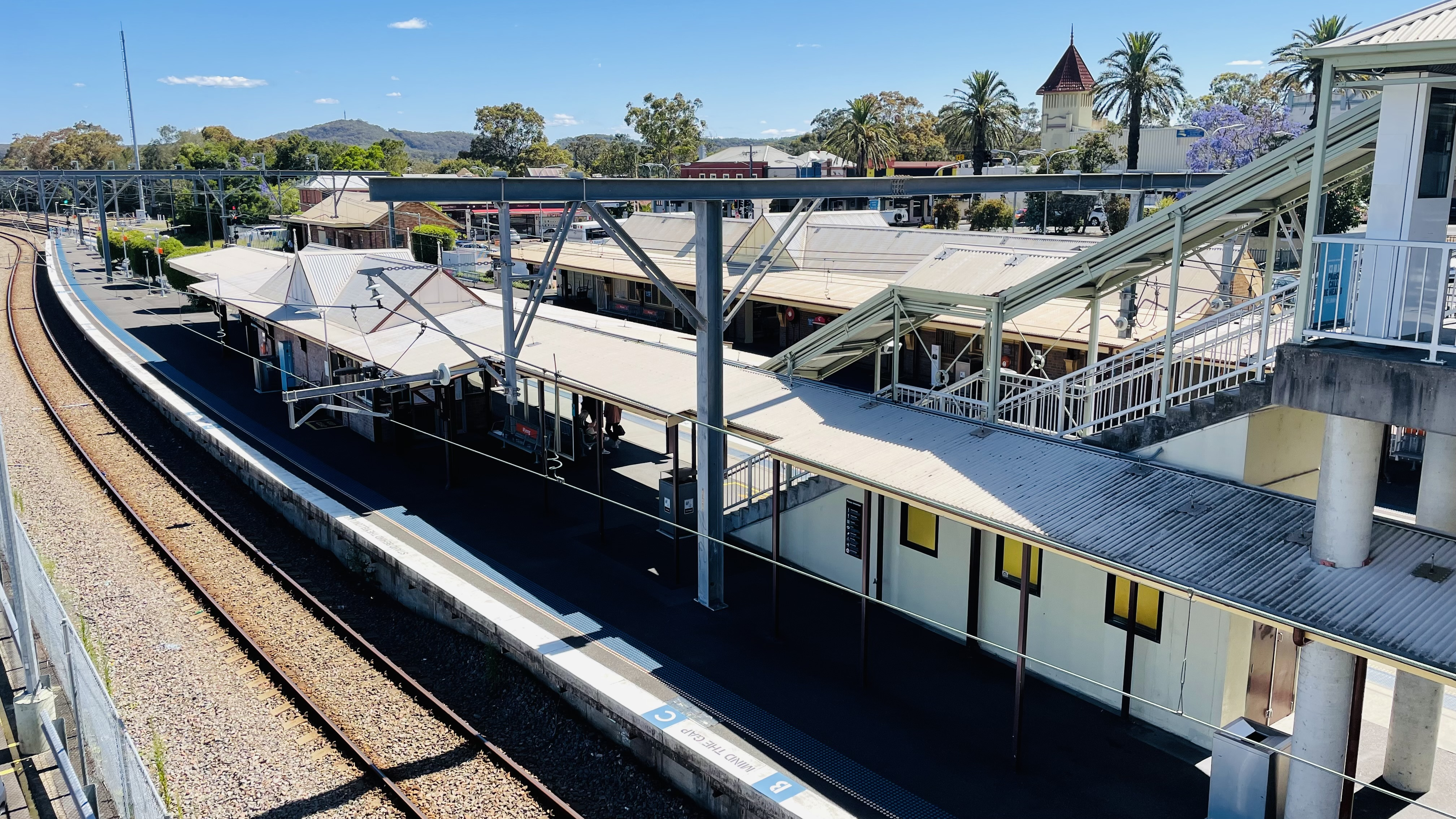
Southbound view to platforms from footbridge

Busways operates seven bus routes via Wyong station, under contract to Transport for NSW:

- 78: Westfield Tuggerah to Lake Haven via Warnervale station
- 79: Westfield Tuggerah to Lake Haven via Watanobbi, Hamlyn Terrace & Woongarrah
- 80: Westfield Tuggerah to Lake Haven via Pacific Highway & Wyong Hospital
- 81: Westfield Tuggerah to Lake Haven via Johns Road Wadalba & Wyongah
- 82: Westfield Tuggerah to Lake Haven via Tacoma & Wyongah
- 93: Westfield Tuggerah to Noraville
- 94: Westfield Tuggerah to Budgewoi

Coastal Liner operates four bus routes via Wyong station, under contract to Transport for NSW:

- 10: Westfield Tuggerah to Warnervale station
- 11: Westfield Tuggerah to Lake Haven
- 12: Westfield Tuggerah to Dooralong via Durren Durren
- 13: to Westfield Tuggerah to Lemon Tree via Warnervale station

Red Bus Services operates seven bus routes via Wyong station, under contract to Transport for NSW:

- 15: to The Entrance
- 16: Wyong to The Entrance
- 19: to Gosford station via Bateau Bay
- 24: to The Entrance via Berkeley Vale & Glenning Valley (combined 25/26 service)
- 25: to The Entrance via Glenning Valley
- 26: Wyong Hospital to The Entrance via Berkeley Vale
- 30: to South Tacoma
