= Gosford railway station =

Railway station in New South Wales, Australia

Gosford
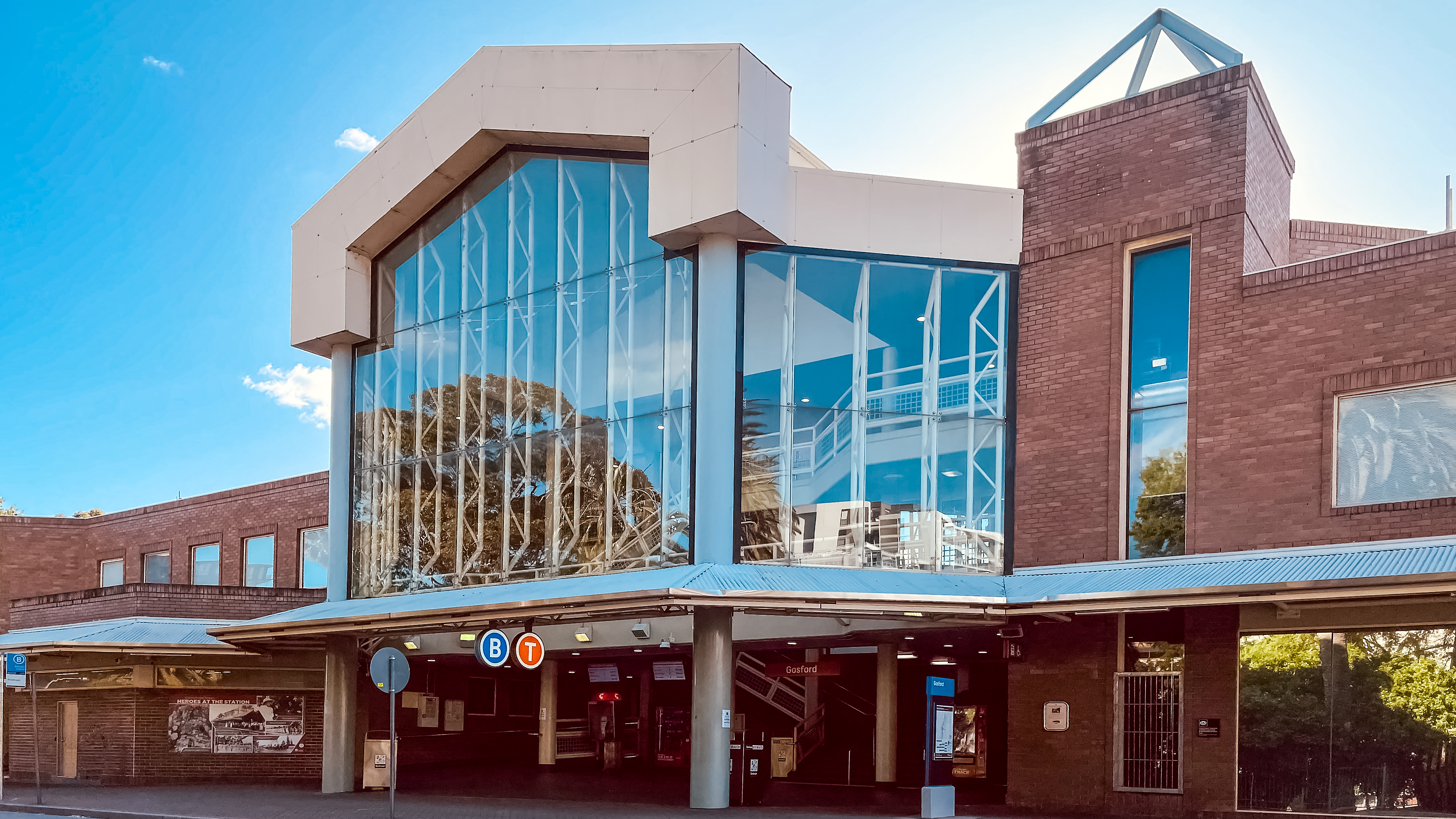
- Main station entrance, November 2022

General information
- Location: Mann Street, Gosford; Australia
- Coordinates: 33°25′25″S 151°20′30″E
- Elevation: 13 metres (43 ft)
- Owner: Transport Asset Manager of New South Wales
- Operator: Sydney Trains
- Line: Main Northern
- Distance: 80.91 km (50.28 mi) from Sydney Central
- Platforms: 3 (1 island, 1 side)
- Tracks: 3
- Connections: Bus

Construction
- Structure type: Ground
- Accessible: Yes

Other information
- Status: Staffed
- Station code: GOS
- Website: Transport for NSW

History
- Opened: 15 August 1887; 139 years ago
- Rebuilt: 10 September 1993

Passengers
- 2025: 2,315,810 (year); 6,345 (daily) (Sydney Trains, NSW TrainLink)

Services
Preceding station	Intercity Trains	Following station
Narara towards Newcastle Interchange	Central Coast & Newcastle Line	Point Clare towards Central
Terminus	Central Coast & Newcastle Line Weekday peak via Gordon	Point Clare towards Central
Narara towards Wyong	Central Coast & Newcastle Line Weekday peak via Gordon	Woy Woy towards Central
Tuggerah towards Newcastle Interchange	Central Coast & Newcastle Line Express	Woy Woy towards Central
Preceding station	NSW TrainLink	Following station
Wyong towards Grafton, Casino or Brisbane	NSW TrainLink North Coast Line	Hornsby towards Sydney
Wyong towards Moree or Armidale	NSW TrainLink North Western Line	Hornsby towards Sydney
Location

Gosford railway station is located on the Main Northern line in New South Wales, Australia. It serves the Central Coast city of Gosford, opening on 15 August 1887.

Between January 1960 and April 1982, Gosford was the northern extremity of the electrified network. The station buildings were demolished and replaced by the current structure which opened on 10 September 1993.

An extensive network of stabling sidings exist north and south of the station. A functioning water crane is located at the northern end of Platform 2 and is used occasionally by passing steam locomotives.

== Facilities ==
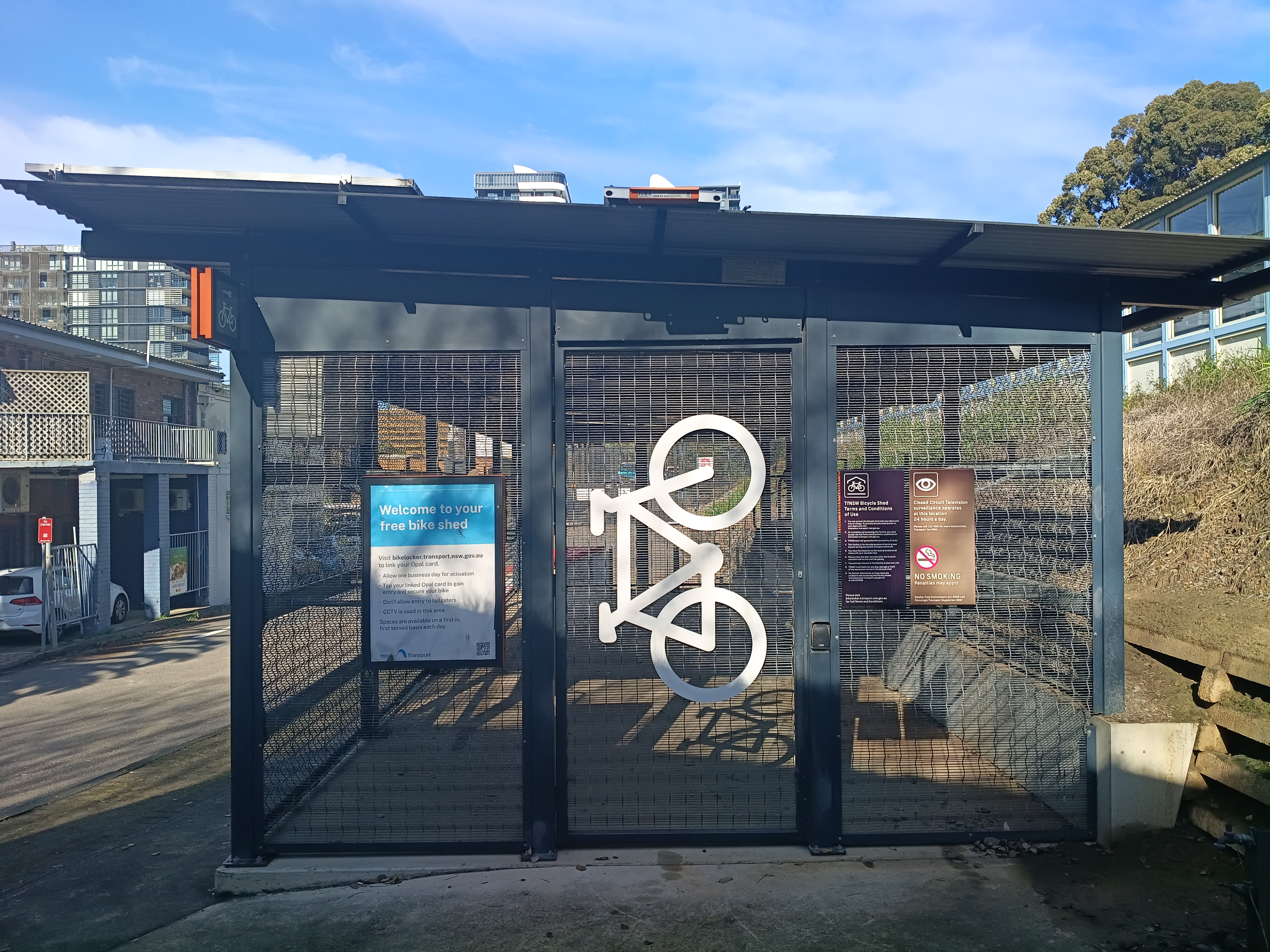
Bike shed at Gosford railway station, New South Wales, providing secure bicycle storage for commuters.

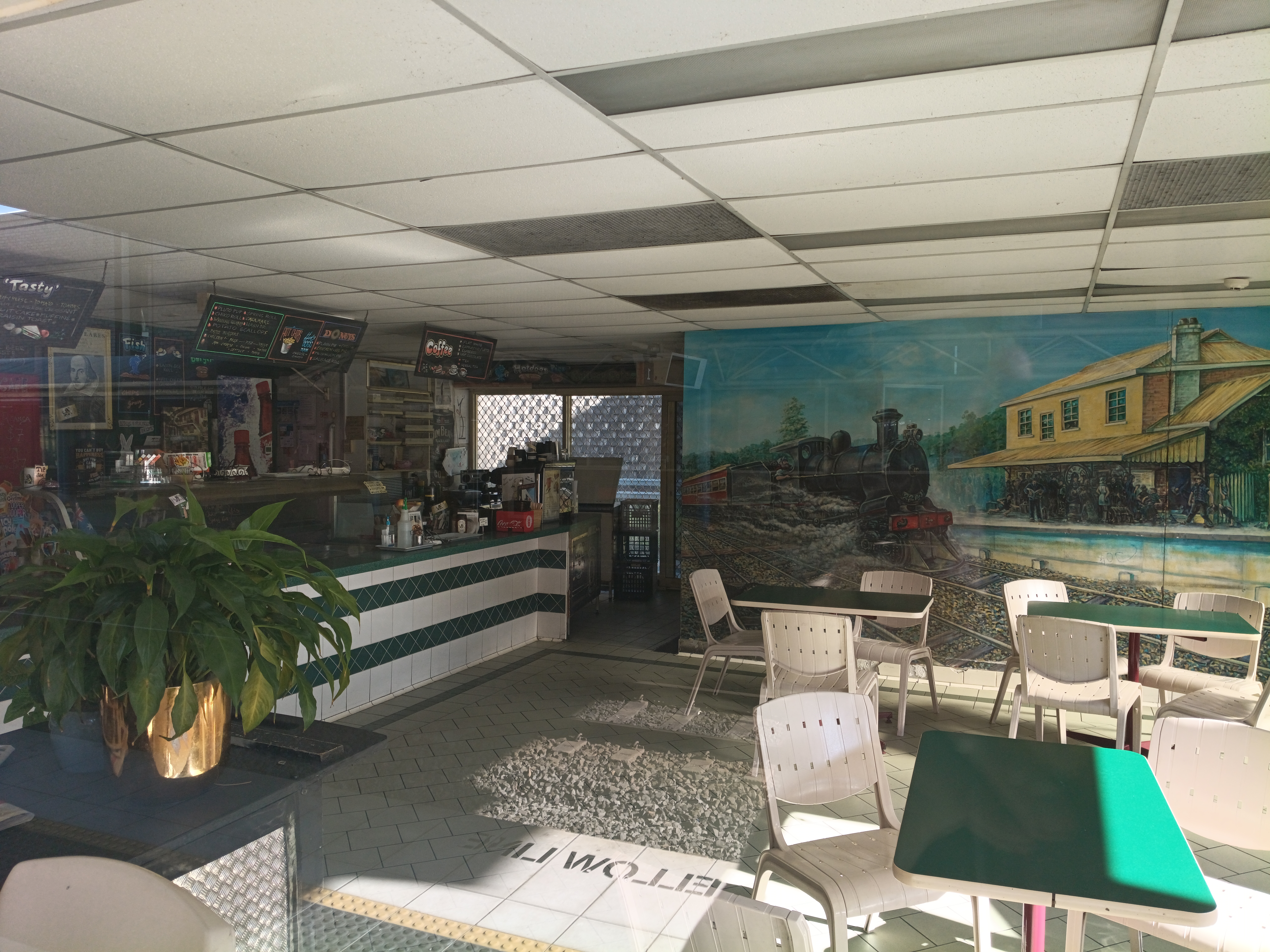
Inside view of the café located on the platform.

Gosford station provides passenger amenities including a café located on the platform. It also provides bicycle parking facilities, including a free public bike shed with 38 spaces available to Opal card holders and eight bicycle lockers available for hire.

== Platforms and services ==
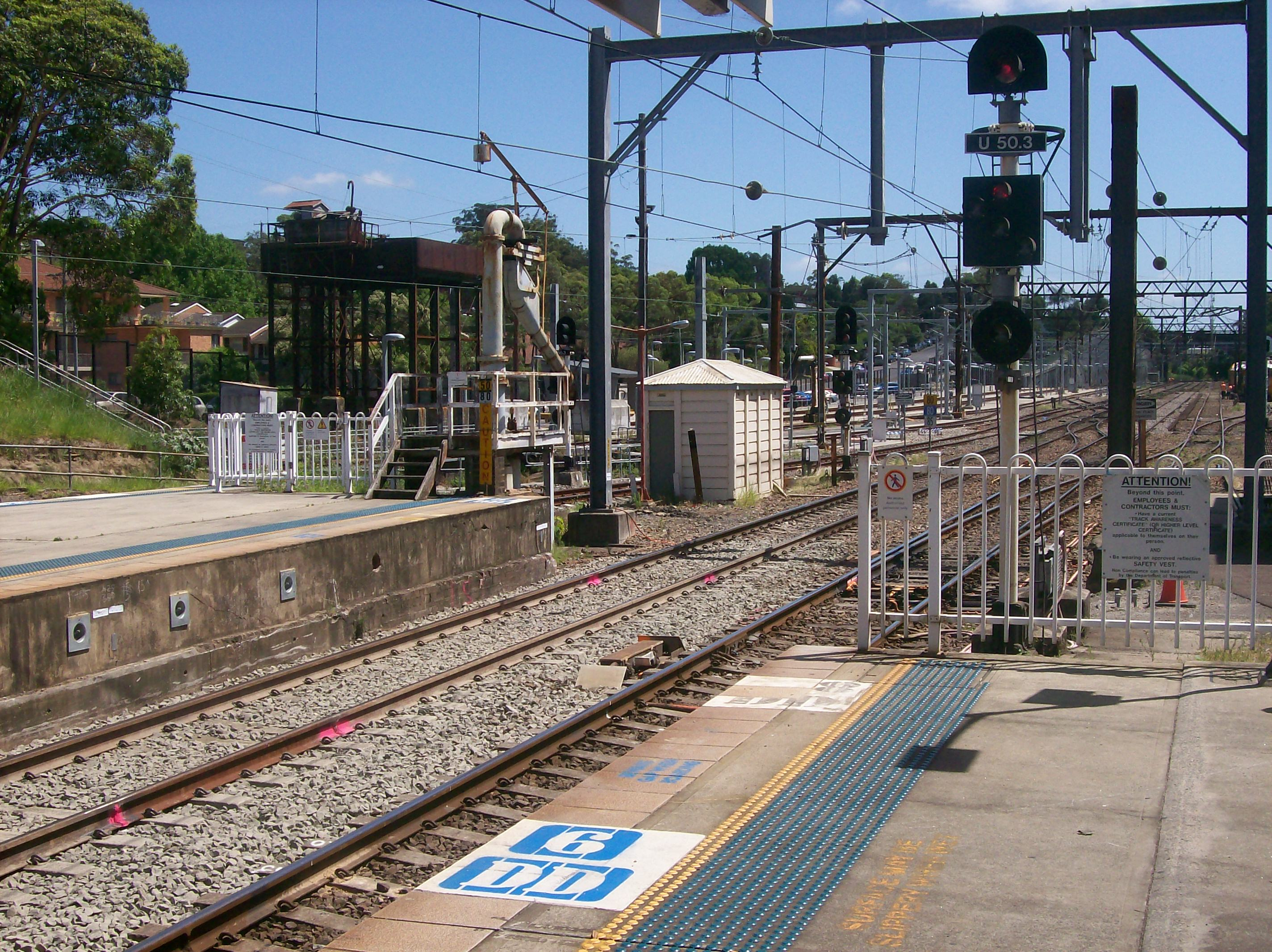
Northbound view from Platform 1 with water crane in January 2011

Gosford has three platforms, one island with two faces and one side platform. It is serviced by Sydney Trains Intercity Central Coast & Newcastle Line services travelling between Sydney, Wyong and Newcastle. There are morning and evening weekday peak hour services that travel between Sydney Central and Wyong via Gordon, while some services terminate and commence at Gosford.

It is also serviced by NSW TrainLink Xplorer and XPT long-distance services between Sydney, Armidale, Moree, Casino and Brisbane.

Platform	Line	Stopping pattern	Notes
1	CCN	Services to Sydney Central via Strathfield	
1	CCN	6 Morning weekday peak hour services to Sydney Central via Gordon	
1	North Coast Region	Services to Sydney Central	Set down only
1	North Western Region	Services to Sydney Central	Set down only
2	CCN	Services to Wyong and Newcastle	
2	North Coast Region	Services to Casino and Brisbane	Pick up only
2	North Western Region	Services to Armidale and Moree	Pick up only
3	CCN	Terminating services from Sydney Central and Newcastle	

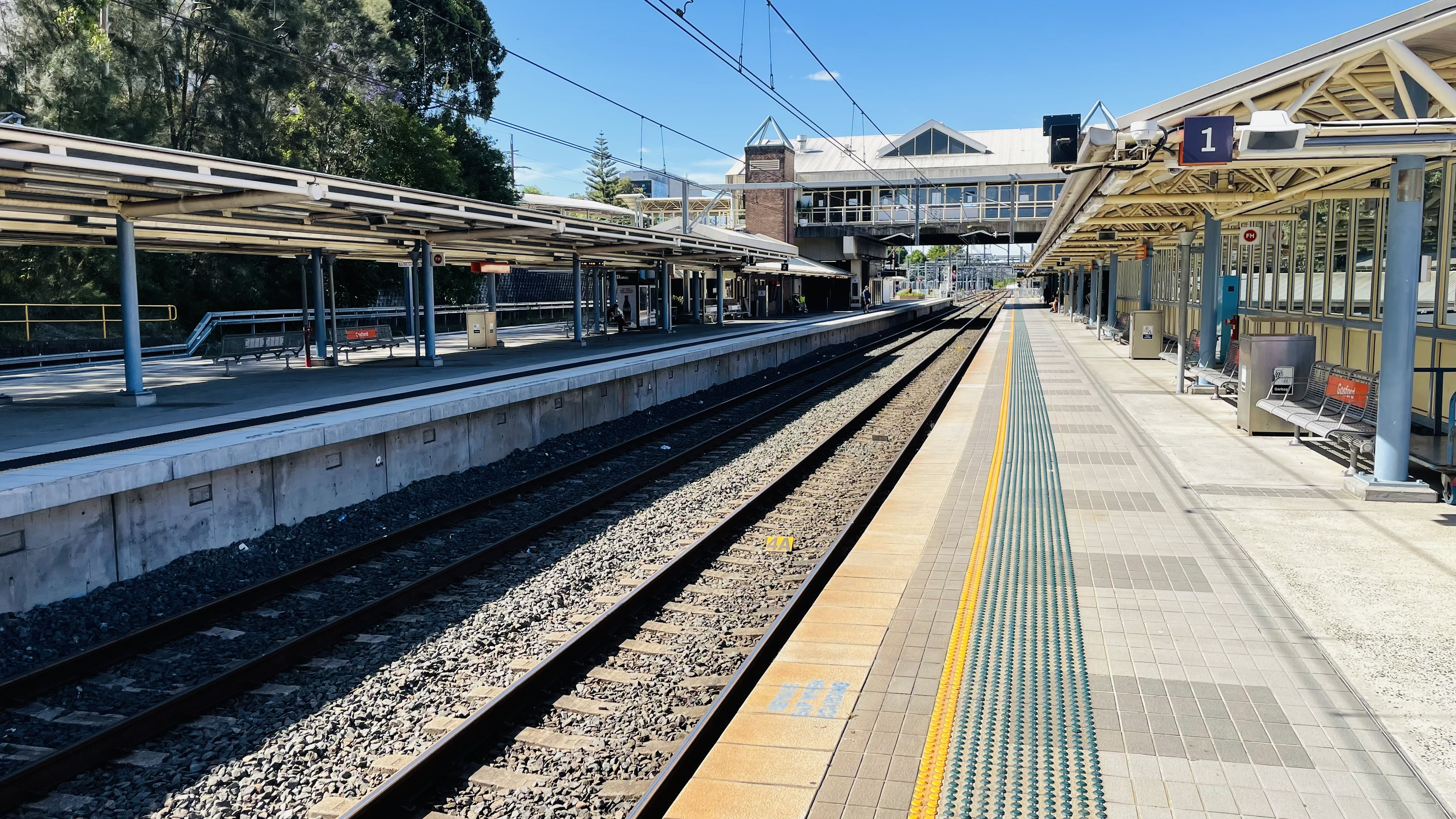
Platform 1

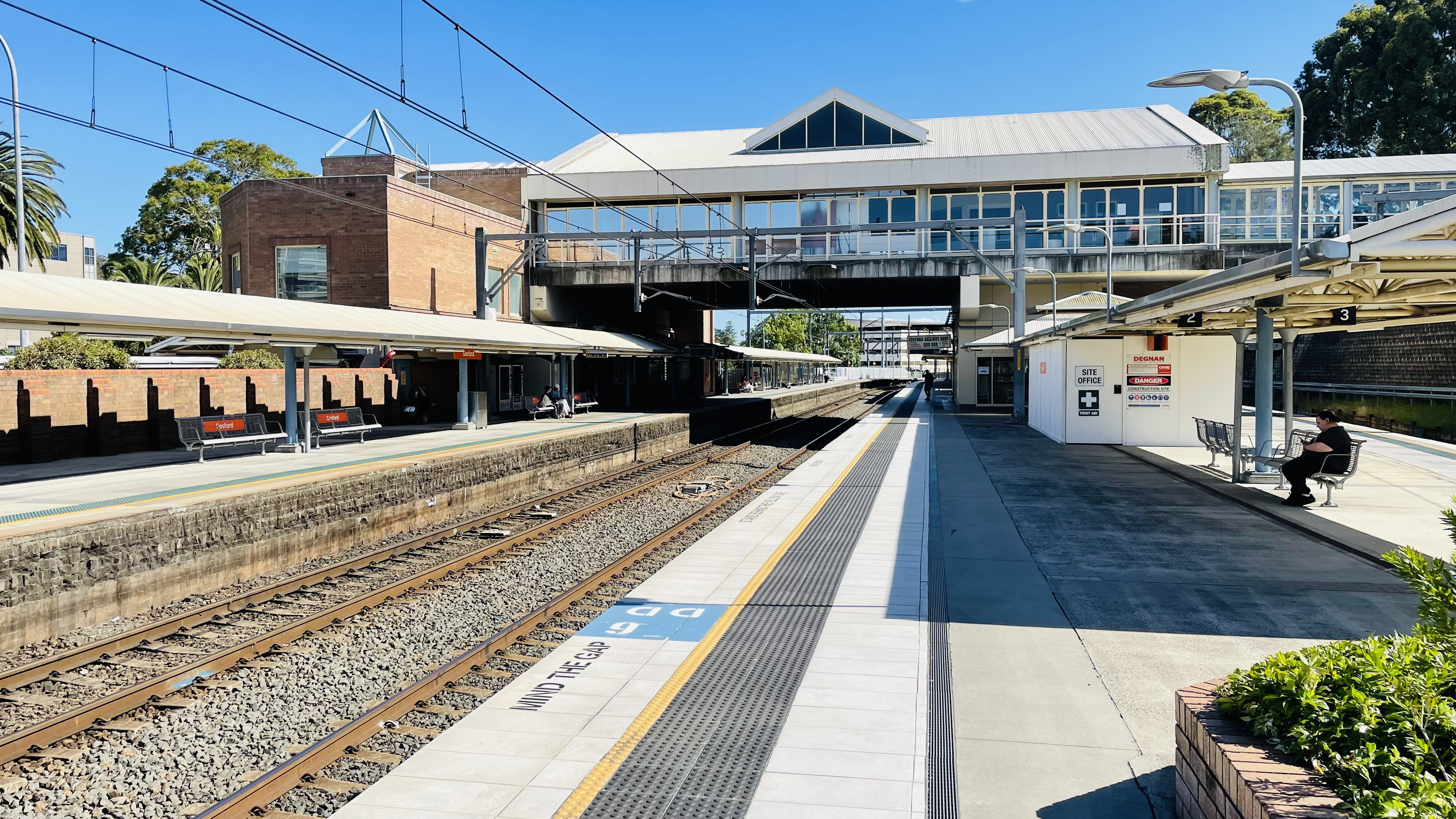
Southbound view to concourse from Platform 2

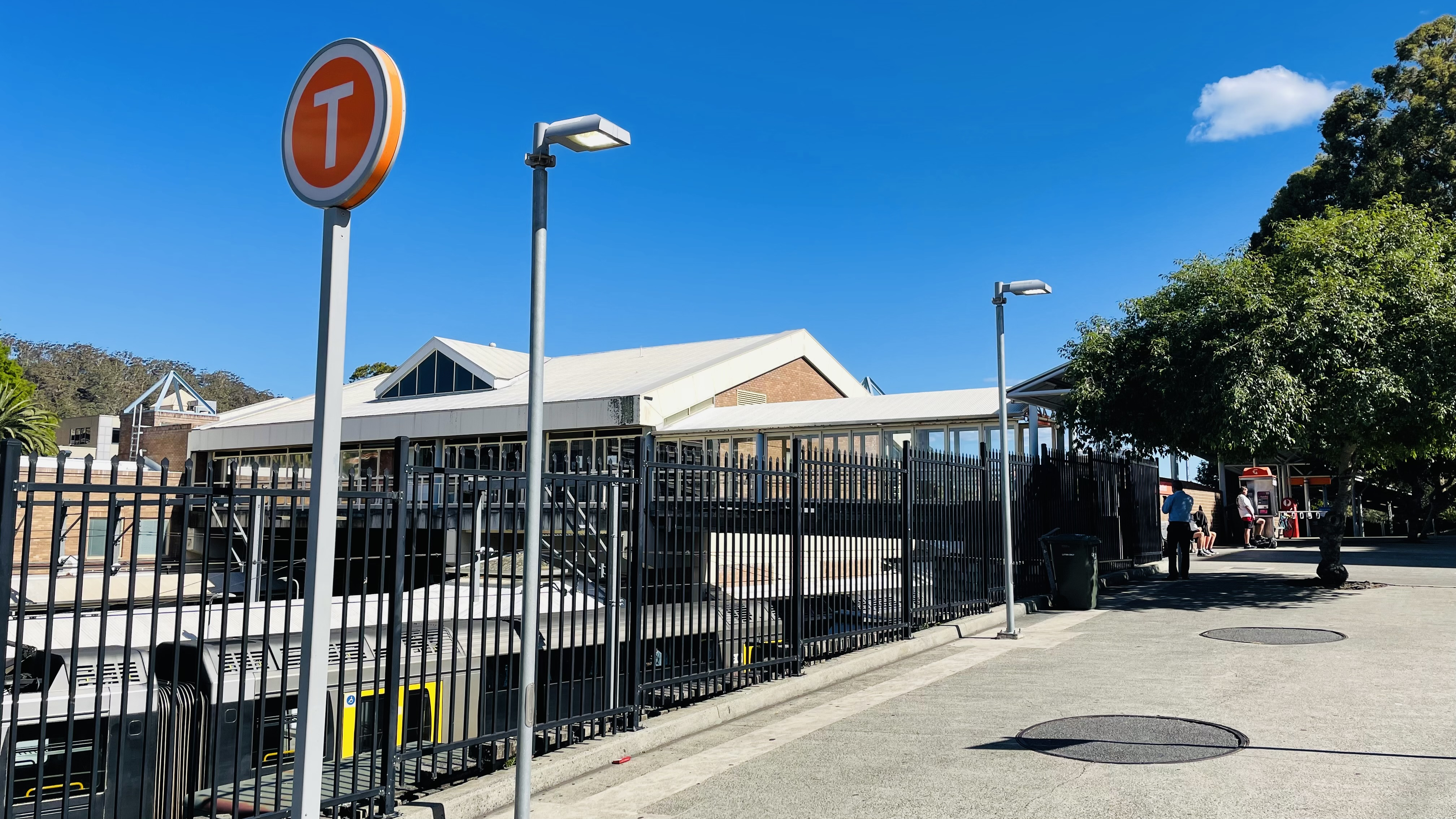
Entrance from Showground road

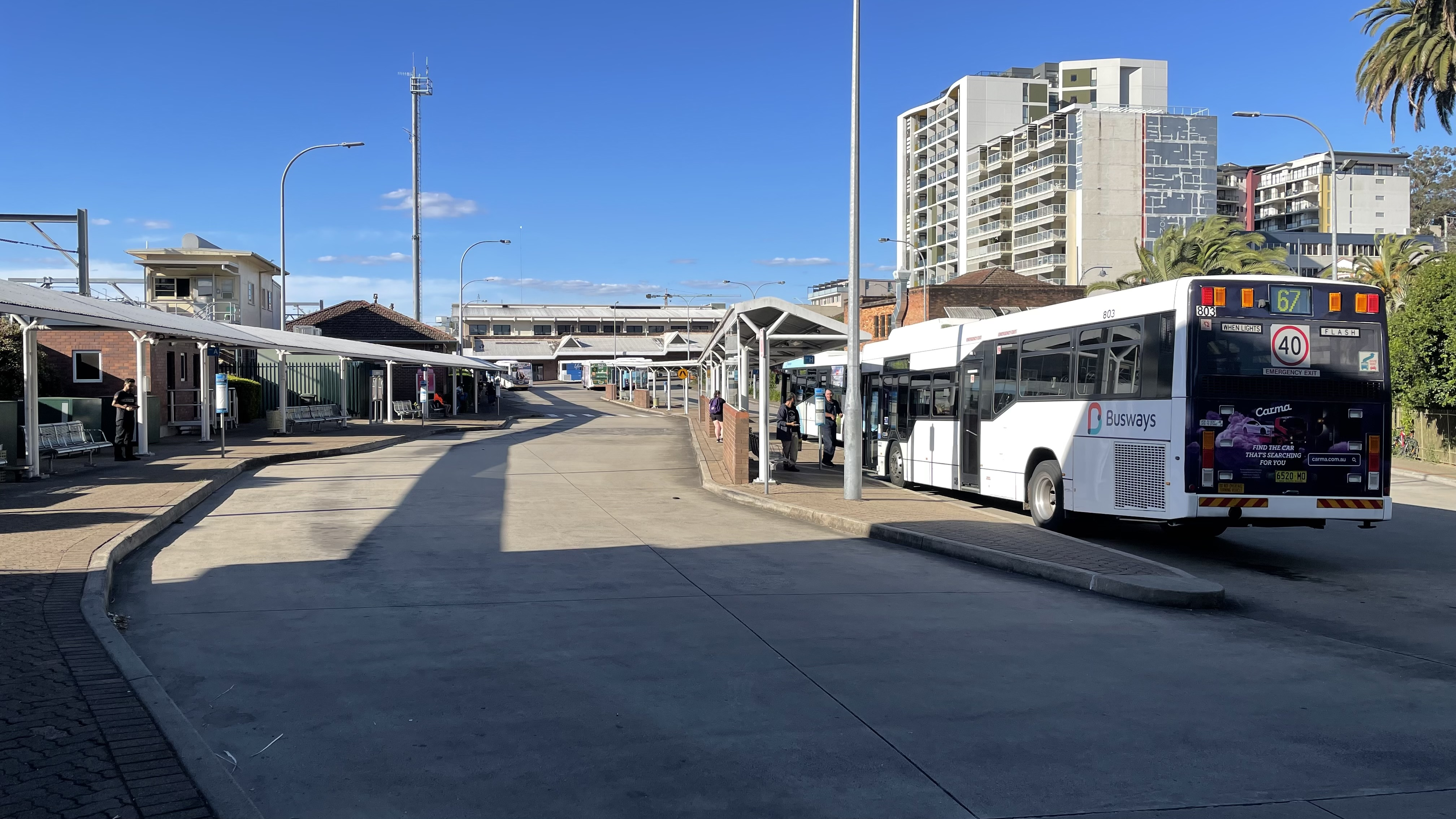
Bus interchange

== Transport links ==
Busways operates 15 bus routes via Gosford station, under contract to Transport for NSW:

- 32: to Spencer
- 33: to Somersby industrial
- 34: to Kariong, some services extend to Somersby, Mangrove Mountain & Spencer
- 36: to Westfield Tuggerah via Narara & Niagara Park
- 37: to Westfield Tuggerah via Settlers Park & Lisarow
- 38: to Wyoming
- 55: to Ettalong Beach & Umina Beach
- 63: to Saratoga via Erina Fair & Davistown
- 64: to Kincumber and Empire Bay
- 65: to Wagstaffe & MacMasters Beach
- 66A: to Avoca & Copacabana anti clockwise
- 66C: to Avoca & Copacabana clockwise
- 67: to North Avoca via Erina Fair & Terrigal
- 68: to Wamberal via Erina Fair & Terrigal
- 70: to Woy Woy & Ettalong Beach

Red Bus Services operates 13 bus routes via Gosford station, under contract to Transport for NSW:

- 17: to The Entrance
- 18: to The Entrance
- 19: to Wyong
- 20: to Matcham loop
- 21: to The Entrance
- 22: to The Entrance
- 23: to The Entrance
- 28: to The Entrance
- 40: to North Gosford loop
- 41: to West Gosford loop
- 42: to Point Frederick loop
- 43: to Springfield
- 44: to Erina Fair
