= Mardi, New South Wales =

Mardi Central Coast, New South Wales
- Coordinates: 33°17′24″S 151°24′36″E
- Population: 3,684 (2016 census)
  - Density: 1,053/km^{2} (2,730/sq mi)
- Postcode(s): 2259
- Elevation: 9 m (30 ft)
- Area: 3.5 km^{2} (1.4 sq mi)
- Location: 77 km (48 mi) SSW of Newcastle; 3 km (2 mi) SW of Wyong; 20 km (12 mi) N of Gosford; 90 km (56 mi) N of Sydney; 16 km (10 mi) WNW of The Entrance
- LGA(s): Central Coast Council
- Parish: Tuggerah
- State electorate(s): Wyong
- Federal division(s): Dobell
Suburbs around Mardi:
| Wyong Creek | Alison | Wyong |
| Ourimbah | Mardi | Tuggerah |
| Kangy Angy | Tuggerah | Tuggerah |

Mardi is a suburb of the Central Coast region of New South Wales, Australia. It is part of the Central Coast Council local government area. The origin of the name is an Aboriginal word meaning 'stone knife'. Mardi had a population of 3,684 at the 2016 census.
