= Tacoma South =

- Suburb
- Interactive map of Tacoma South
- Coordinates: 33.296°S 151.453°E
- Country: Australia
- State: New South Wales
- City: Central Coast
- LGA: Central Coast Council
- Location: 6 km (3.7 mi) ESE of Wyong

Government
  - State electorate: Wyong
  - Federal division: Dobell

Area
  - Total: 1.4 km^{2} (0.54 sq mi)

Population
  - Total: 265 (2011 census)
  - Density: 189/km^{2} (490/sq mi)
- Postcode: 2259
- Parish: Tuggerah
Suburbs around Tacoma South
| Wyong | Tacoma | Tacoma |
| Tuggerah | Tacoma South | Rocky Point |
| | Tuggerah Lake |

Tacoma South is a suburb of the Central Coast region of New South Wales, Australia. It is part of the Central Coast Council local government area.

The suburb, which is primarily bushland, is bordered by Wyong River and Tuggerah Nature Reserve. There is only one way in and out of the suburb.

Access to Tacoma South is via a low bridge 3.4 meters on South Tacoma Road:
