= Rocky Point, New South Wales =

Rocky Point Central Coast, New South Wales
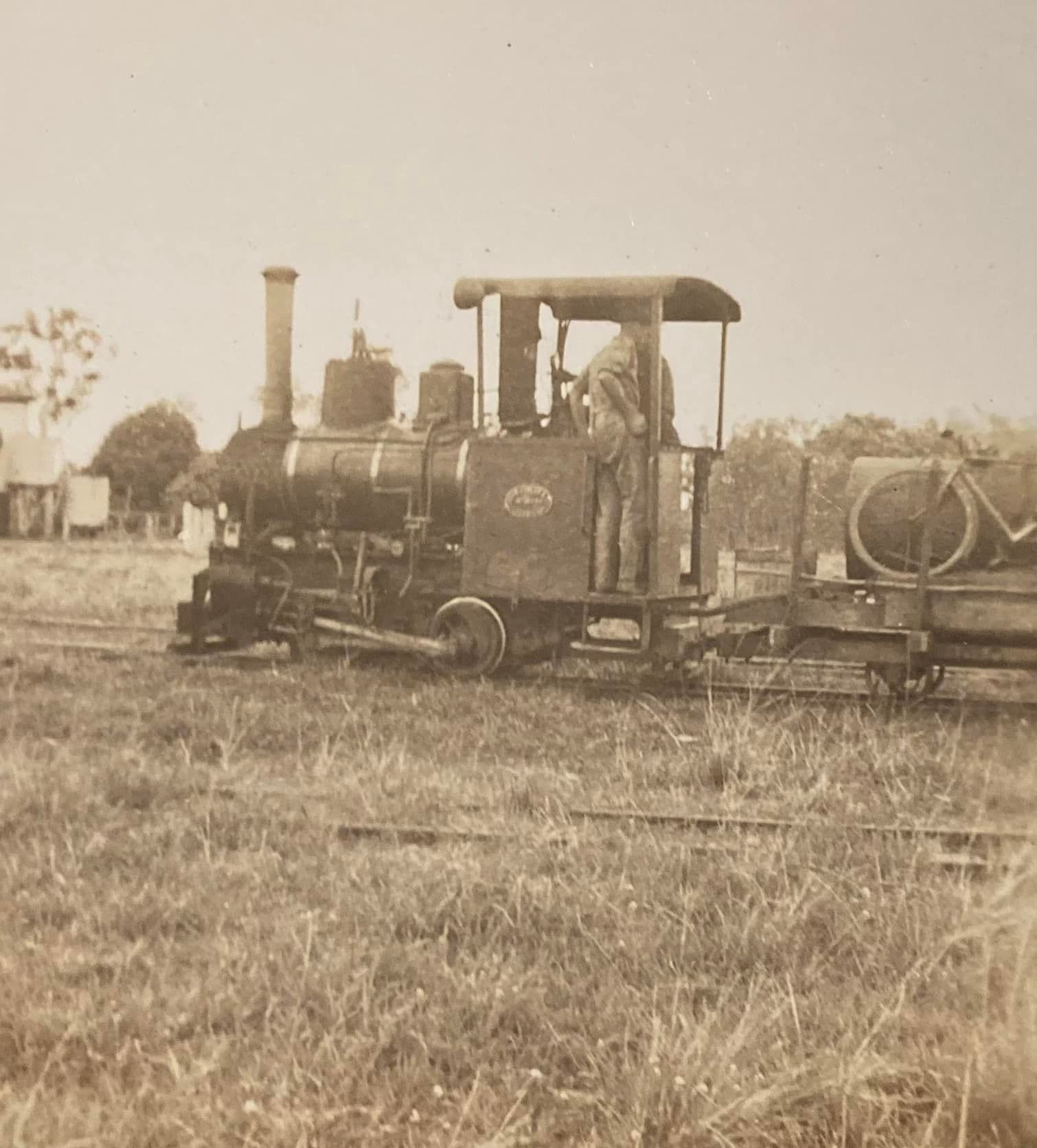
- John Fowler narrow-gauge steam locomotive of Rocky Point sugar mill

- Coordinates: 33°17′49″S 151°28′5″E
- Population: 274 (2011 census)
  - Density: 2,700/km^{2} (7,000/sq mi)
- Postcode(s): 2259
- Area: 0.1 km^{2} (0.0 sq mi)
- Location: 6 km (4 mi) E of Wyong
- LGA(s): Central Coast Council
- Parish: Munmorah
- State electorate(s): Wyong
- Federal division(s): Dobell
Suburbs around Rocky Point:
	Tacoma	Tuggerawong
Tacoma South	Rocky Point
		Tuggerah Lake

Rocky Point is a suburb of the Central Coast region of New South Wales, Australia. It is part of the Central Coast Council local government area. It has a covering an area of 0.127 square kilometres. Rocky Point has a recorded population of 262 (2021) residents and is within the Australian Eastern Daylight Time zone Australia. Rocky Point marks the northern flank of Minnie Water's stretch of beach

== Known inhabitants ==
- Bungaree, Aboriginal Leader
- Nils Seethaler, Anthropologist
