= Tuggerah =

Coordinates: 33°17′56″S 151°26′06″E

- Suburb
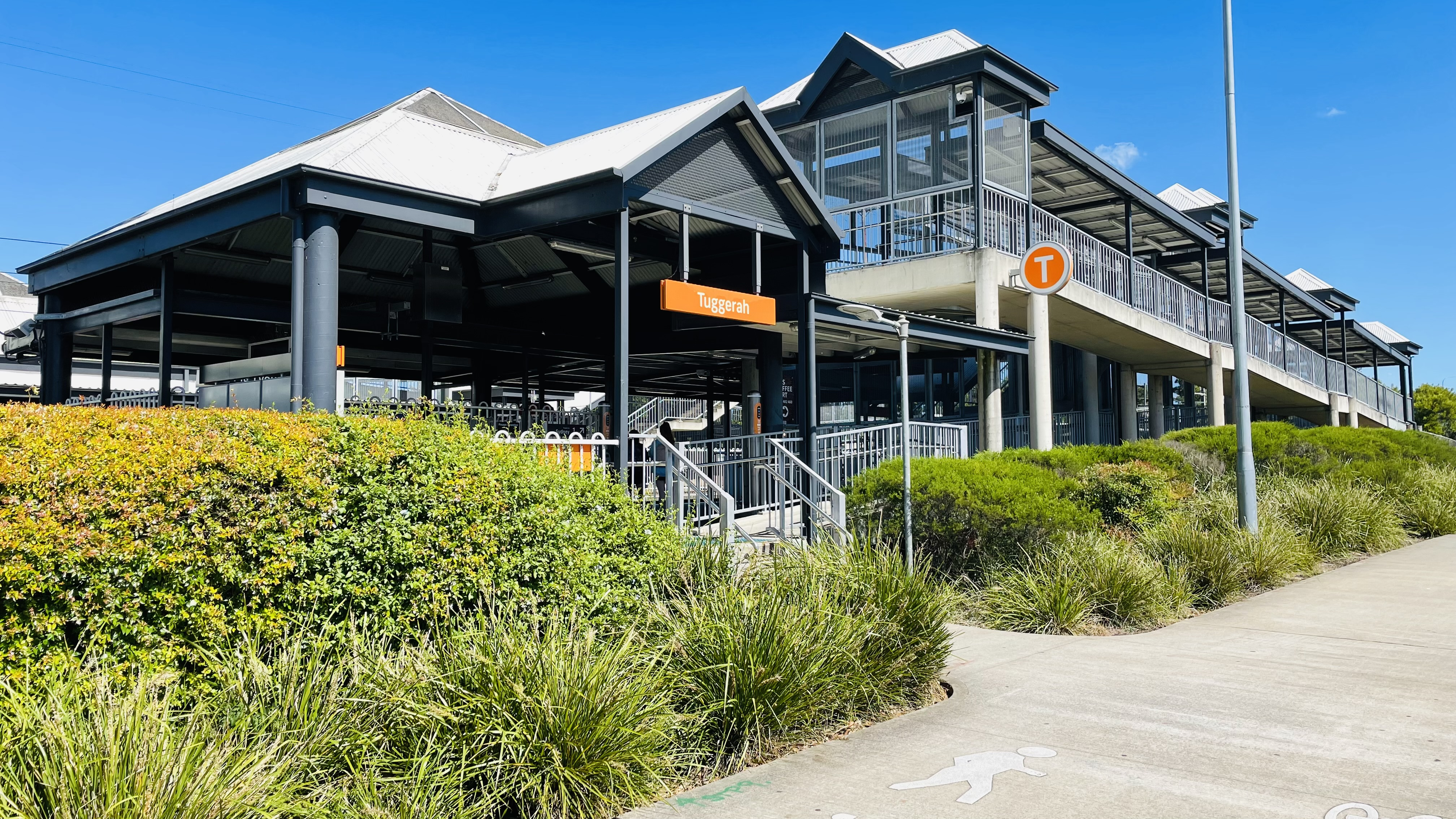
- Entrance of Tuggerah railway station
- Interactive map of Tuggerah
- Country: Australia
- State: New South Wales
- City: Central Coast
- LGA: Central Coast Council
- Location: 68 km (42 mi) S of Newcastle; 3 km (1.9 mi) S of Wyong; 91 km (57 mi) N of Sydney; 22 km (14 mi) N of Gosford; 17 km (11 mi) NW of The Entrance

Government
  - State electorate: Wyong, The Entrance
  - Federal division: Dobell

Area
  - Total: 1.8 km^{2} (0.69 sq mi)
- Elevation: 6 m (20 ft)

Population
  - Total: 925 (SAL 2021)
- Postcode: 2259
- Parish: Tuggerah
Suburbs around Tuggerah
Wyong	Wyong	Tacoma South
Mardi	Tuggerah	Tuggerah Lake
Kangy Angy	Berkeley Vale	Chittaway Point

Tuggerah (/ˈtʌɡərə/) is a large commercial hub and a suburb of the Central Coast region of New South Wales, Australia. It is located approximately 91 km north of Sydney and 68 km south of Newcastle. It is the second largest business hub, major shopping area and financial district for the Central Coast after Erina.

It is a mixture of semi-rural, residential, and light industrial. Historically it was, like much of the Wyong District, a dairy area, and still has the Pioneer Dairy Wetlands. There was an airstrip for some years which has now been built over. The Wyong South sewerage plant is also located in Tuggerah. Tuggerah is located in the Central Coast Council local government area.

== History ==
=== Etymology ===
Tuggerah was originally an Aboriginal word, but its true meaning is not agreed upon by all sources. Some say that it originally meant 'cold' or 'cold place', and some say its original meaning was 'savannah grasslands'. Tuggerah was the name for the region, with The Entrance originally called "Tuggerah Entrance". "Tuggerah Beach" is located between North Entrance and Noraville. There was previously an electorate in the Parliament of New South Wales called Tuggerah.

== Commercial area ==
Tuggerah is a major light industrial and commercial area for the northern Central Coast. It is a huge attraction for the Central Coast and further out residents for its shopping centre Westfield Tuggerah as well as the Tuggerah Supa Centre in Bryant Drive and numerous other shops along the Pacific Highway. A number of well known business have headquarters and offices in the Tuggerah Business Park such as Belkin, ING Australia, as well as the Zenith Business Centre on Reliance Drive.

== Transport ==
Tuggerah railway station is on the North Coast railway line and Pacific Motorway. Tuggerah railway station is served by 18 Busways and Red Bus CDC NSW bus routes.
