= Westfield Tuggerah =

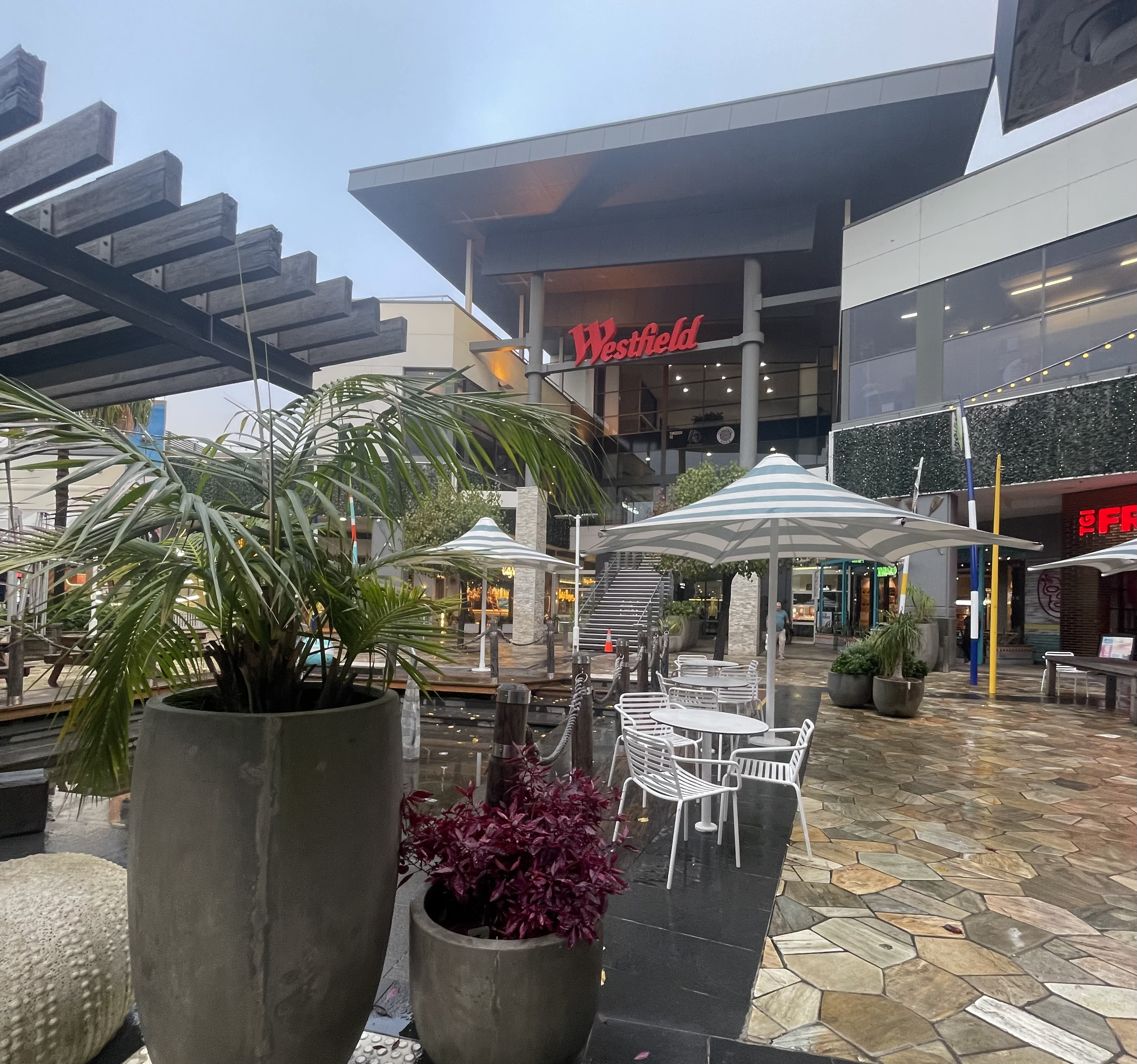
- Tuggerah Westfield Entrance
- Location: Tuggerah, New South Wales, Australia
- Coordinates: 33°18′30″S 151°24′48″E
- Address: 50 Wyong Road
- Opened: 19 October 1995
- Manager: Scentre Group
- Owner: Scentre Group
- Num. of stores: 244
- Num. of anchor tenants: 7
- Floor area: 84,238 m^{2} (906,730 sq ft)
- Floors: 2
- Parking: 3,157 spaces
- Public transit: Bus
- Website: www.westfield.com.au/tuggerah

Westfield Tuggerah is a large shopping centre in the suburb of Tuggerah on the Central Coast, New South Wales, Australia. It is the second largest shopping centre on the Central Coast after Erina Fair.

Westfield Tuggerah is one of the two Westfield branded shopping centres in New South Wales that is not located within the Greater Sydney area, with Westfield Kotara being located in Newcastle.

== Transport ==
Tuggerah railway station is 400 metres away from Westfield Tuggerah and is on the Main Northern railway line. The station is serviced by Sydney Trains services which operate between Sydney and Wyong and Newcastle.

Westfield Tuggerah is located adjacent to an exit from the M1 Motorway.

Westfield Tuggerah has bus connections to Charmhaven, The Entrance, Gosford, Lake Haven, Ourimbah and Wyong, as well as local surrounding suburbs. It is served by Busways and Red Bus CDC NSW. The majority of its bus services are located at the bus interchange outside Event Cinemas.

Westfield Tuggerah has multi level car parks with 3,157 spaces.

== History ==
Westfield Tuggerah opened on 19 October 1995 after only 13 months of construction. The $170 million development was built on a greenfield site that was located across the road from the Wyong District Abattoirs. Originally a single storey shopping complex surrounded by car parks, the centre featured the Central Coast's only David Jones, as well as Big W, Woolworths, Intencity arcade, an eight screen Greater Union cinema, international food court and 140 specialty stores.

Following the opening there has been a progressive decline in shopping in the nearby towns, with many empty stores and banks in Wyong in particular.

During construction of the 2004 extension, a man was electrocuted and killed. His death prompted the Australian Chamber of Commerce and Industry to highlight work safety laws, stating this was another unneeded death on the worksite.

This development added a second level onto the existing centre in July 2005 and the restaurant precinct was added in September 2005. By 2006, the whole redevelopment and extension was completed and opened. This redevelopment added in a Target, Harris Scarfe, Aldi, Coles, Trade Secret, Lincraft, JB Hi-Fi, Timezone arcade and 90 specialty stores.

In 2008, approval was given for another extension to expand the centre by 16,500m² and create a two-level enclosed shopping centre. The expansion proposed a third discount department store, four extra cinemas and another 40 stores and more car parks. However this approval was not acted on.

In September 2009, Myer announced a proposal for a store in the centre to open by the end of 2013. The proposals were for a store of two levels and approximately 12,000 square metres. This was at the time of Myer's re-listing on the share market.

In December 2013, plans were for a $50 million expansion of Westfield Tuggerah to add a further 12,638 m^{2} of retail space to its existing centre with work planned for two stages. The first stage would involve the addition of the two level Myer store, new stores and an expanded parking area. Stage 2 would include a Vmax cinema.

In September 2015, it was announced that there would be no Myer opening at Tuggerah and any expansion plans would be suspended.

On 25 July 2016, H&M opened its first Central Coast store in the centre. TK Maxx which replaced Trade Secret opened on 17 May 2018.

On 21 January 2020, Harris Scarfe closed down. It was replaced by JB Hi-Fi, which relocated within the shopping centre. iPlay replaced Timezone and opened on 6 March 2021.

In early 2021, David Jones closed its upper level so the store was reduced to a single level store. On 18 November 2021, Kmart opened on the former level 2 David Jones space.

On 11 January 2026, David Jones permanently closed its store after 30 years of trade and a replacement store is yet to be announced.

== Future ==
Westfield Tuggerah is part of the $2.8 billion Tuggerah Town Centre masterplan to develop Tuggerah as a lifestyle hub. The masterplan proposes a combination of uses for the 70 hectares of land including new community facilities, large green spaces and parklands and the creation of active transport connections to a redeveloped transport interchange at Tuggerah station. It will also transform the surrounding area into a major hub of employment, transport, housing, leisure, health and education. As part of this masterplan Westfield Tuggerah will add more entertainment, leisure and dining options and expand to the vacant land behind the centre and on the other side of Tonkiss St, as well as nearby land owned by Darkinjung Local Aboriginal Land Council.

== Tenants ==
Westfield Tuggerah has 84,238m² of floor space. The major retailers include Big W, Kmart, Target, Aldi, Coles, Woolworths, H&M, TK Maxx, JB Hi-Fi, Rebel, iPlay and Event Cinemas.
