= Tacoma, New South Wales =

Tacoma Central Coast, New South Wales
- Coordinates: 33°17′56″S 151°28′5″E
- Population: 751 (2011 census)
  - Density: 289/km^{2} (748/sq mi)
- Postcode(s): 2259
- Area: 2.6 km^{2} (1.0 sq mi)
- Location: 4 km (2 mi) E of Wyong
- LGA(s): Central Coast Council
- Parish: Munmorah
- State electorate(s): Wyong
- Federal division(s): Shortland
Suburbs around Tacoma:
Wyong	Wadalba	Wadalba
Wyong	Tacoma	Tuggerawong
Tacoma South	Rocky Point	Rocky Point

Tacoma is a suburb of the Central Coast region of New South Wales, Australia. It is part of the Central Coast Council local government area.

Tacoma is located on the northern bank of the Wyong River where it opens up onto Tuggerah Lake. It has a general store, a school, Tacoma Public School and a Fishermans Co-operative. The suburb is also home to the Wyong Lakes Magpies Australian Football Club. In 2024, there were around 215 kids in Tacoma Public School; they also have a Aboriginal year 5 to year 6 aboriginal programs with Tuggerahwong public school.
