= Lisarow railway station =

Railway station in New South Wales, Australia

Lisarow
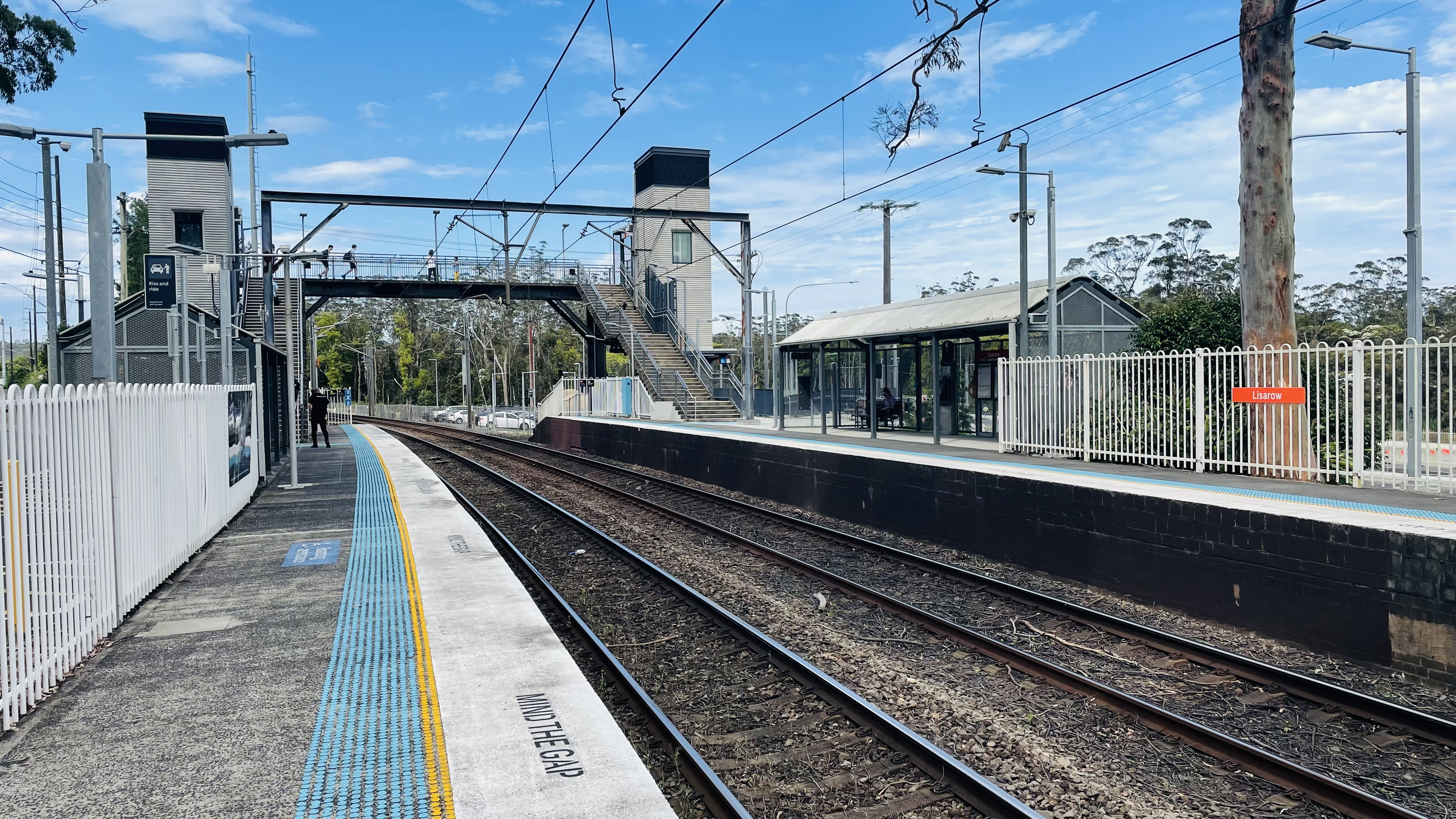
- Northbound view from Platform 2, November 2022

General information
- Location: Old Pacific Highway, Lisarow; Australia
- Coordinates: 33°22′56″S 151°22′11″E
- Owner: Transport Asset Manager of New South Wales
- Operator: Sydney Trains
- Line: Main Northern
- Distance: 87.73 km (54.51 mi) from Central
- Platforms: 2 side
- Tracks: 2
- Connections: Bus

Construction
- Structure type: Ground
- Accessible: Yes

Other information
- Station code: LRW
- Website: Transport for NSW

History
- Opened: 31 October 1892; 133 years ago
- Former names: Jenkins Siding (1892–1902); Wyoming (1902)

Passengers
- 2025: 70,024 (year); 192 (daily) (Sydney Trains, NSW TrainLink)

Services
| Preceding station | Intercity Trains | Following station |
|---|---|---|
| Ourimbah towards Newcastle Interchange | Central Coast & Newcastle Line | Niagara Park towards Central |
Location

Lisarow railway station is located on the Main Northern line in New South Wales, Australia. It serves the northern Central Coast suburb of Lisarow opening on 31 August 1892 as Jenkins Siding. On 1 February 1902 it was renamed Wyoming and again on 2 April 1902 as Lisarow.

The station was upgraded in November 2021, with lifts added.

== Platforms and services ==
Lisarow has two side platforms. It is serviced by Sydney Trains Intercity Central Coast & Newcastle Line services travelling between Sydney Central, Wyong and Newcastle.

| Platform | Line | Stopping pattern | Notes |
| 1 | CCN | Services to Gosford & Sydney Central | |
| 2 | CCN | Services to Wyong & Newcastle | |

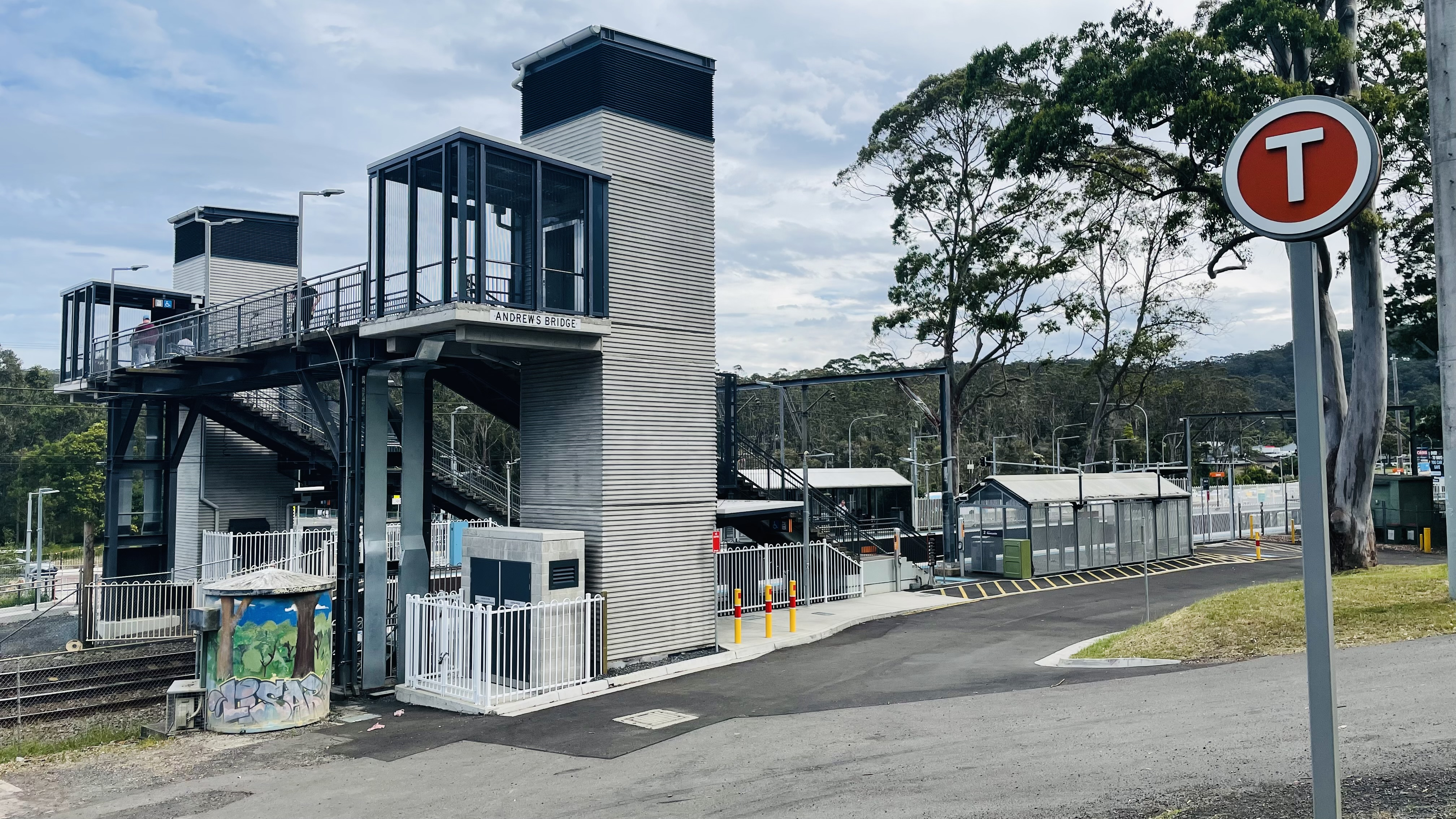
Entrance on Railway Cres

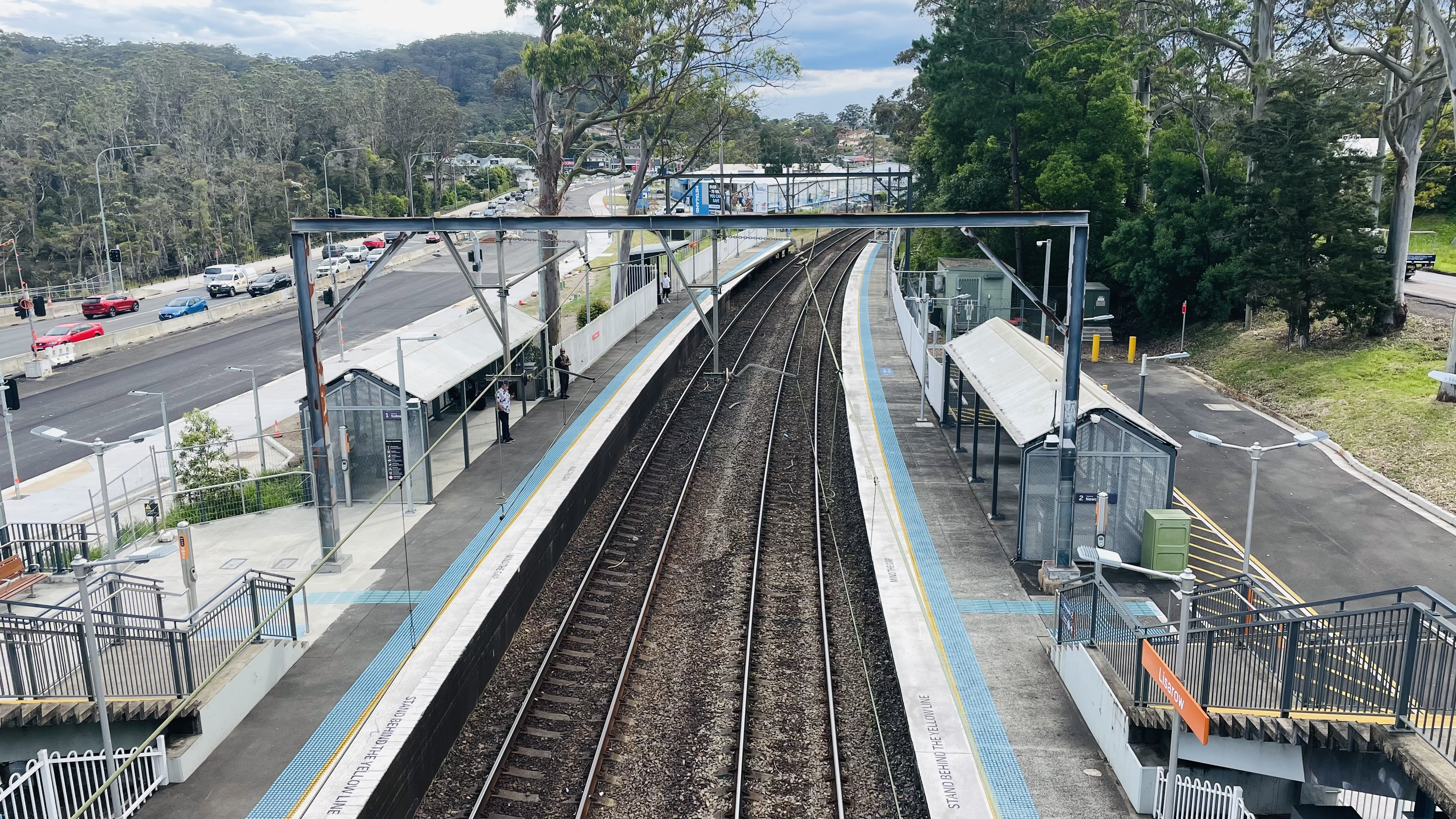
Southbound view from footbridge

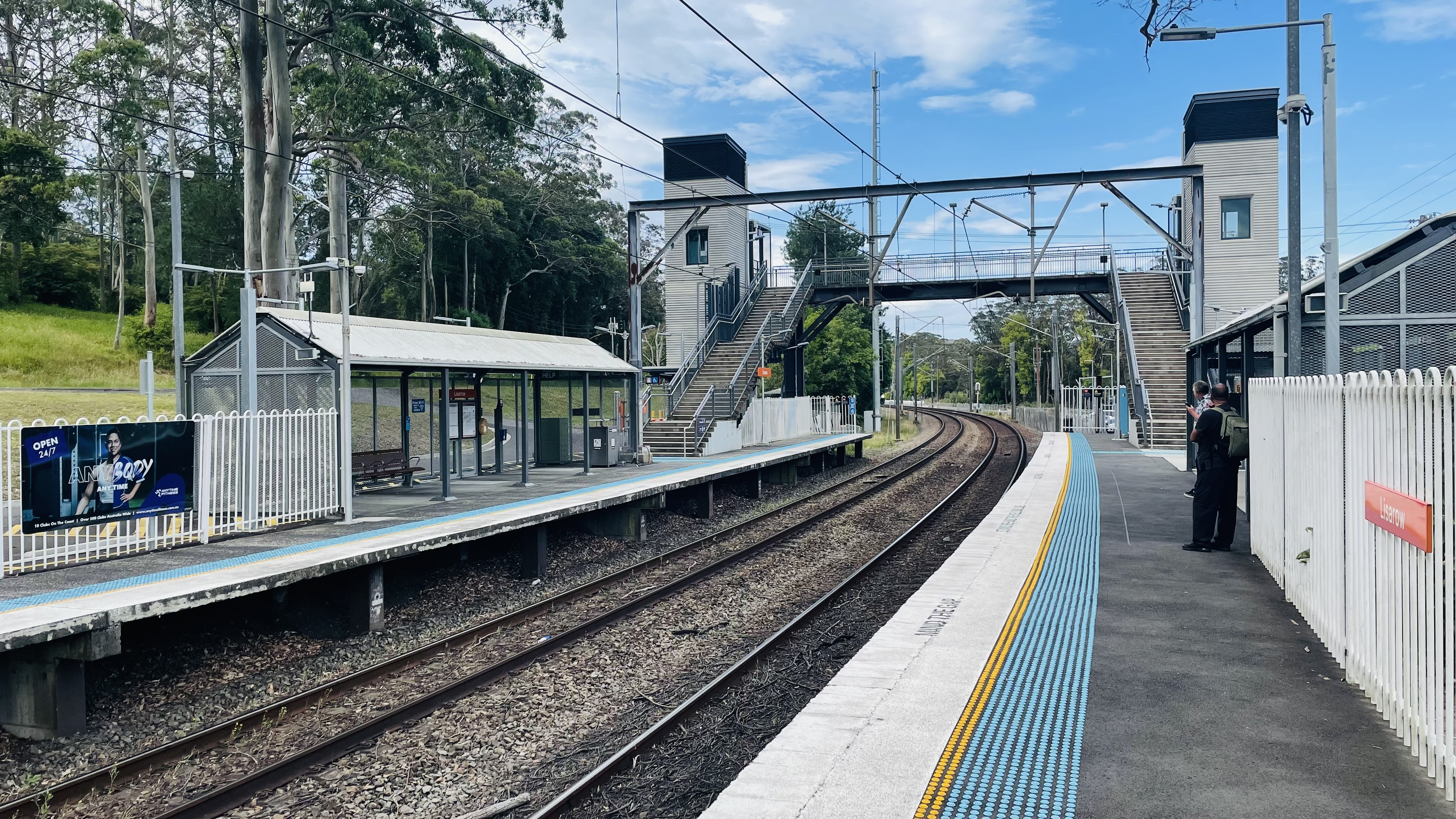
Northbound view from Platform 1

== Transport links ==
Busways operates two bus routes via Lisarow station, under contract to Transport for NSW:

- 36: Gosford station to Westfield Tuggerah via Narara
- 37: Gosford station to Westfield Tuggerah via Wyoming
