= Wyoming Cottage =

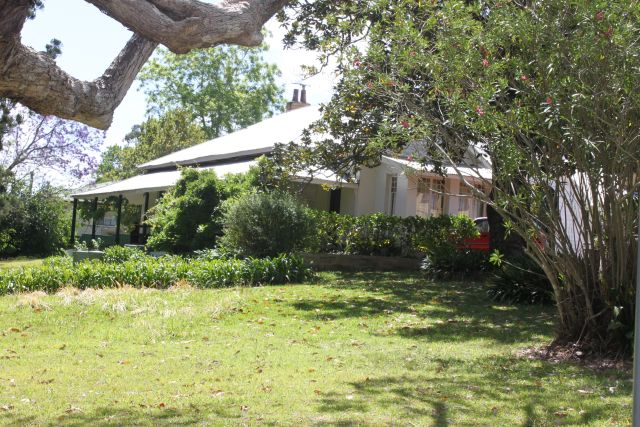

- Location within New South Wales Location within Australia
- 33.4020°S 151.3499°E
- Location: 1 Wyoming Road (Cnr. Pacific Highway), Wyoming, Central Coast, New South Wales, Australia

Site notes
- Architect: John Verge

New South Wales Heritage Register
- Official name: Wyoming Cottage
- Type: state heritage (built)
- Designated: 2 April 1999
- Reference no.: 213
- Type: Cottage
- Category: Residential buildings (private)

Wyoming Cottage is a heritage-listed residence at 1 Wyoming Road, Cnr. Pacific Highway, Wyoming, Central Coast, New South Wales, Australia. It was designed by John Verge and built with convict labour. The suburb Wyoming is named for the Cottage and the original farm. It was added to the New South Wales State Heritage Register on 2 April 1999.

== History ==
Frederick Augustus Hely was Principal Superintendent of Convicts from 1823 until his death in 1836. He was appointed by the Earl of Bathurst in January 1823 and arrived in the Colony of New South Wales later that year with his wife and three children. As head of the Convict Department he was stationed in Sydney but hoped to settle at Brisbane Water where he obtained a large grant of land. By 1825 he had established a farm called Wyoming in the Narara Valley. It is possible that Hely named his property after the Wyoming Valley in Pennsylvania, from a famous poem, Gertrude of Wyoming by Thomas Campbell, dated 1809. This name predates the use of Wyoming for the U.S. state, which was officially named in 1865.

Hely was one of the first land owners in the district and by far the largest. With the advantages of wealth and position, his life style and work provide an important contrast to that of the small settler of which the district abounded.

Hely engaged Architect John Verge to design Wyoming Cottage and in his ledger for June 1832, Verge listed his design for a large cottage at Brisbane Water, noting on 25 June that he had finished the plan and three elevations, as well as specifications for iron work, glass and working plans for the same. The house itself was not completed until after Hely's death in 1837 with construction finished in 1843. Frederick’s body was buried in a family vault on the estate at Wyoming, approximately 100m from the house. The Verge designed vault survives, but is no longer part of the property.

Wyoming remained the residence of Hely family members, including Hovendon Hely, until January 1869. Except for a brief period as a private hospital and nursing home (1957-1969) it has been used as a residence since that time.

In 1979 the Gosford Historical Research Association nominated Wyoming for protection under the Heritage Act. Although there was no immediate threat to the cottage the Association was concerned that future subdivision of the property for residential purposes would impact upon Wyoming Cottage.

An Interim Heritage Order was placed over Wyoming Cottage on 1 August 1980. On 27 August 1982 a Permanent Conservation Order was placed over Wyoming Cottage. It was transferred to the State Heritage Register on 2 April 1999.

== Description ==
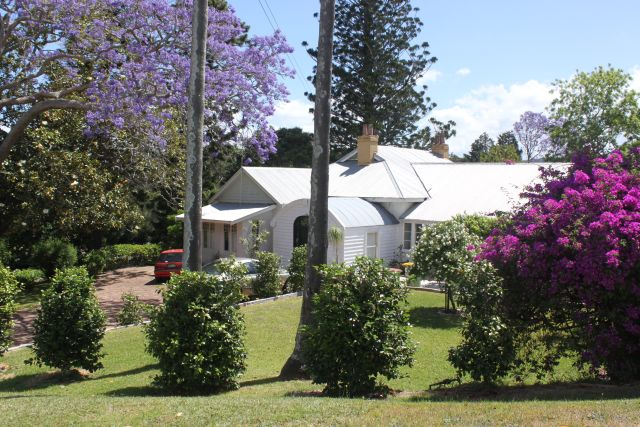
Wyoming Cottage

The original section of this Colonial bungalow is of sandstock bricks finished with stucco. The house has a simple plan, typical of cottages of this period, with a central hallway, with pairs of rooms on either side, and a verandah wrapping around the front and side elevations. The four main rooms have fireplaces with either timber or marble surrounds. The three bedrooms have glazed French doors to the verandahs. These are likely to be original as evidenced by the very fine profile of the mullions. The front door seems to be original with finely detailed side lights and fanlight.

Timber extensions (c. 1900) have pressed metal ceilings and incorporate a side entrance with barrel vaulted roof in corrugated iron. A stone entrance at the rear is of more recent date but the stone extension blocks are from demolished building(s) on the Hely property. At the rear of the site, and linked to the main house is a sandstone service wing. This structure may be original, though some reports indicate that it was constructed using recycled blocks from buildings on the estate. This building is linked to the main house by a lightweight timber and glazed infill structure, and the whole rear wing has been incorporated under a continuation of the original roof. A galvanised roof has replaced the original shingles however early shingles are still extant under the metal sheets. The original section has an impressive archway in the entrance hall. An enclosure on the western side verandah is unsympathetic.

The house stands on a corner site on the Pacific Highway, it is enhanced by a large number of mature trees, including several large pines of the species Bunya (Araucaria bidwillii), Hoop (Araucaria cunninghamii) and Norfolk Island (Araucaria heterophylla). The garden also features mature Jacarandas, Moreton Bay figs, English oak, magnolia and vabbage yree pPalms. These are mostly in front of the house and along the Wyoming Road boundary. The scale of these mature trees, and the distinctive forms of the various pines identify this site as an early settlement in the area and contribute to its landmark status.

== Heritage listing ==
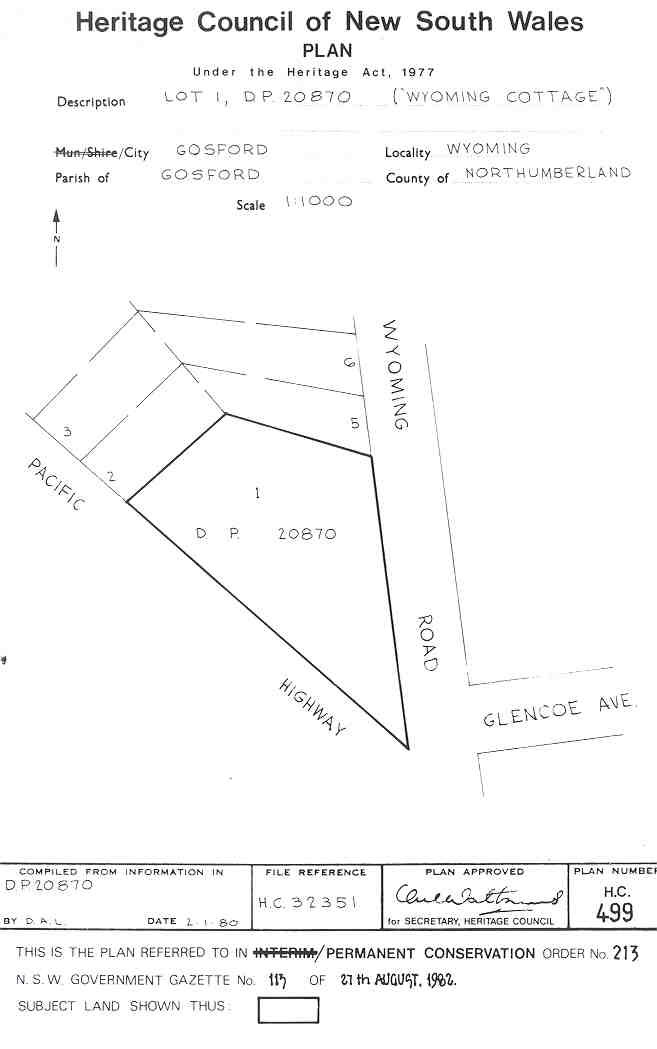
Heritage boundaries

Wyoming Cottage is one of the relatively few remaining buildings known to have been designed by the eminent architect, John Verge. It was the country residence designed for Frederick Augustus Hely, Principal Superintendent of Convicts for the Colony of New South Wales, an important man in the early history of the colony and a pioneer in the Gosford district. It has survived as a rare example of the house of a wealthy early settler of the district. The former stables of the property now known as The Grange and Hely's Grave survive and are listed on the New South Wales Heritage Register.

Wyoming Cottage was listed on the New South Wales State Heritage Register on 2 April 1999.
