= Frederick Augustus Hely =

Australian public servant (1794–1836)

Frederick Augustus Hely (1794 – 8 September 1836), a public servant and settler of colonial Australia, was born in County Tyrone, Ireland. He was the son of Colonel Forbes Francis Hely.

== In New South Wales ==
At eighteen years of age, in the year 1812, he married Georgina Lindsay Bucknell. While there is no evidence of the actual time when Hely came to Australia, it is known that he was given the post of Principal Superintendent of the Convicts in New South Wales sometime in early 1823. However, it was later in the year that he arrived in Sydney, with his wife and children, to actually take up the post (a post he would hold throughout the entirety of the rest of his life). Hely held several other additional positions of public and social influence becoming a justice of the peace in 1825 and president of the Board of Magistrates in 1826. The year following, he became acting superintendent of police, and, in 1831, was appointed a member of the Assignment Board. Later, in 1832, Hely applied for an appointment as stipendiary magistrate at Brisbane Water, where he had a farm and had commissioned a home, Wyoming Cottage. However, he was offered a salary increase of £100 from the £200 he was already earning to induce him to stay as superintendent of convicts (an office in which he had been quite successful in the past). Two years later, Hely became a foundation director of the Commercial Banking Company of Sydney.

== Land ownership ==
Hely established a farm, which he called Wyoming, after he was granted almost 550 hectares of land at Narara, Brisbane Water in 1824, and, in doing so, became the first European man to settle there permanently and to grow a citrus fruit orchard garden. It is possible that Hely named his property after the Wyoming Valley in Pennsylvania, from a famous poem, Gertrude of Wyoming by Thomas Campbell, dated 1809. This name predates the use of Wyoming for the U.S. state, which was officially named in 1865. In 1829, Hely's land was expanded to approximately 4,000 acres (16 km^{2}), or a little over 1600 hectares, after further grants in the districts of Ourimbah and Tuggerah. The land Hely was granted in Tugerah at one time incited a fierce conflict with William Cape, a free settler who did not report his selection of land to the government before clearing around 100 acres (0.40 km^{2}) of land and building a barn on the land which was later granted to Hely. The Darkinyung and Guringai peoples were the traditional custodians of the area, although by 1828 conflict and smallpox had decimated their populations, with only 5 family groups of 65 people remaining.

== Death ==
In 1836, Hely began to suffer periods of bad health, and he was recommended for retirement, with a pension to live on. However, before the pension could be approved, Hely died of apoplexy in Sydney. He was survived by his wife and his five children (three daughters and two sons).

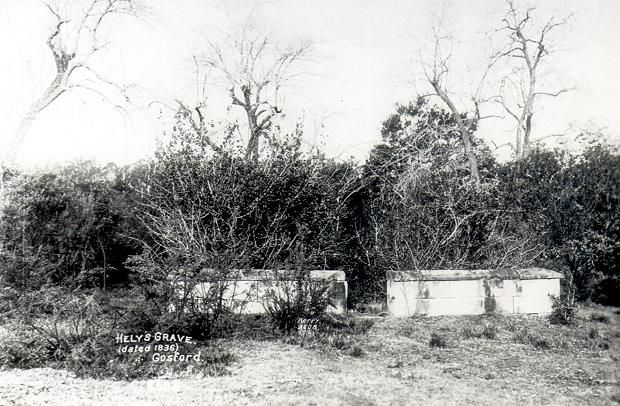
Grave of Frederick Augustus Hely, Wyoming, NSW, Australia

His grave is located at 559 Pacific Highway, Wyoming. The headstone reads:

"IN MEMORY

OF

FREDERICK AUGUSTUS HELY ESQ

DIED 8th SEPTEMBER 1836

AGED 42 YEARS

HIS LOVED REMAINS LIE IN THIS SPOT

BY HIS OWN REQUEST"

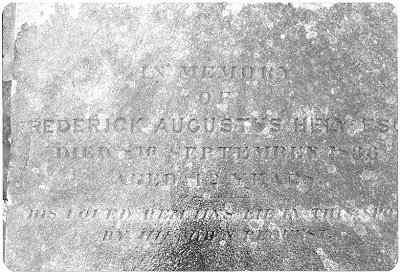
Inscription on the grave of Frederick Augustus Hely

The homestead of Hely's former farm (now Wyoming Cottage), its former stables (now a residence known as The Grange) and Hely's Grave all survive and are listed on the New South Wales Heritage Register.
