= Hely's Grave =

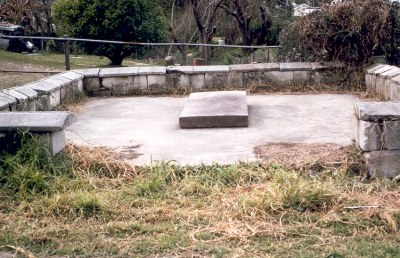

- Location within New South Wales Location within Australia
- 33.4031°S 151.3505°E
- Location: Pacific Highway, Wyoming, Central Coast, New South Wales, Australia

History
- Built: 1836–

Site notes
- Architect: John Verge
- Owner: Gosford City Council

New South Wales Heritage Register
- Official name: Hely's Grave
- Type: state heritage (archaeological-terrestrial)
- Designated: 2 April 1999
- Reference no.: 53
- Type: Isolated Grave/Burial Site
- Category: Cemeteries and Burial Sites

Hely's Grave is a heritage-listed grave at 559 Pacific Highway, Wyoming, Central Coast, New South Wales, Australia. It was designed by John Verge and built in 1836. The property is owned by the Central Coast Council. It was added to the New South Wales State Heritage Register on 2 April 1999.

== History ==
Frederick Augustus Hely was Principal Superintendent of convicts from 1823 until his death in 1836. As head of the Convict Department he was stationed in Sydney but hoped to settle in Brisbane Waters where he obtained a large land grant. By 1825 he established a farm called Wyoming in the Narara valley.

Hely was one of the first land owners in the district and by far the largest. With the advantages of wealth and position, his life style and work provide an important contrast to that of the small settler of which the district abounded.

Hely died at his home Engehurst in Darlinghurst on 8 September 1836.

== Description ==
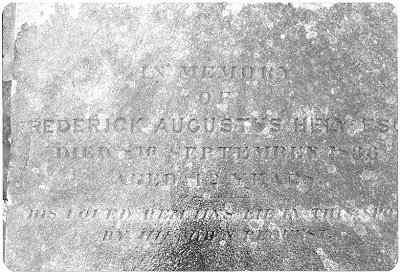
Headstone inscription

Hely's Grave consists of a low stone wall approximately 6 metres square which has a shaped coping which appears to have once supported a decorative railing. In the centre of the walled area sits a simple engraved slab of sandstone.

The inscription reads:

In memory
of
Frederick August Hely Esq
died 8th September 1836
aged 42 years
His loved remains lie in this spot
At his own request

The monument was reported to be in a deteriorated condition as at 20 June 2000. Sandstone blocks have been chipped, broken and dislodged. The surrounding land and parts of the perimeter wall are overgrown with vegetation.

== Heritage listing ==
The remains of the Hely Estate comprise Wyoming Cottage, which was the main cottage, The Grange which was the stables building (now a residence) and Hely's Grave. All three items were designed by the eminent architect John Verge and are three of the relatively few of his works which survive.

Hely's Grave was listed on the New South Wales State Heritage Register on 2 April 1999.
