= Ourimbah railway station =

Railway station in New South Wales, Australia

Ourimbah
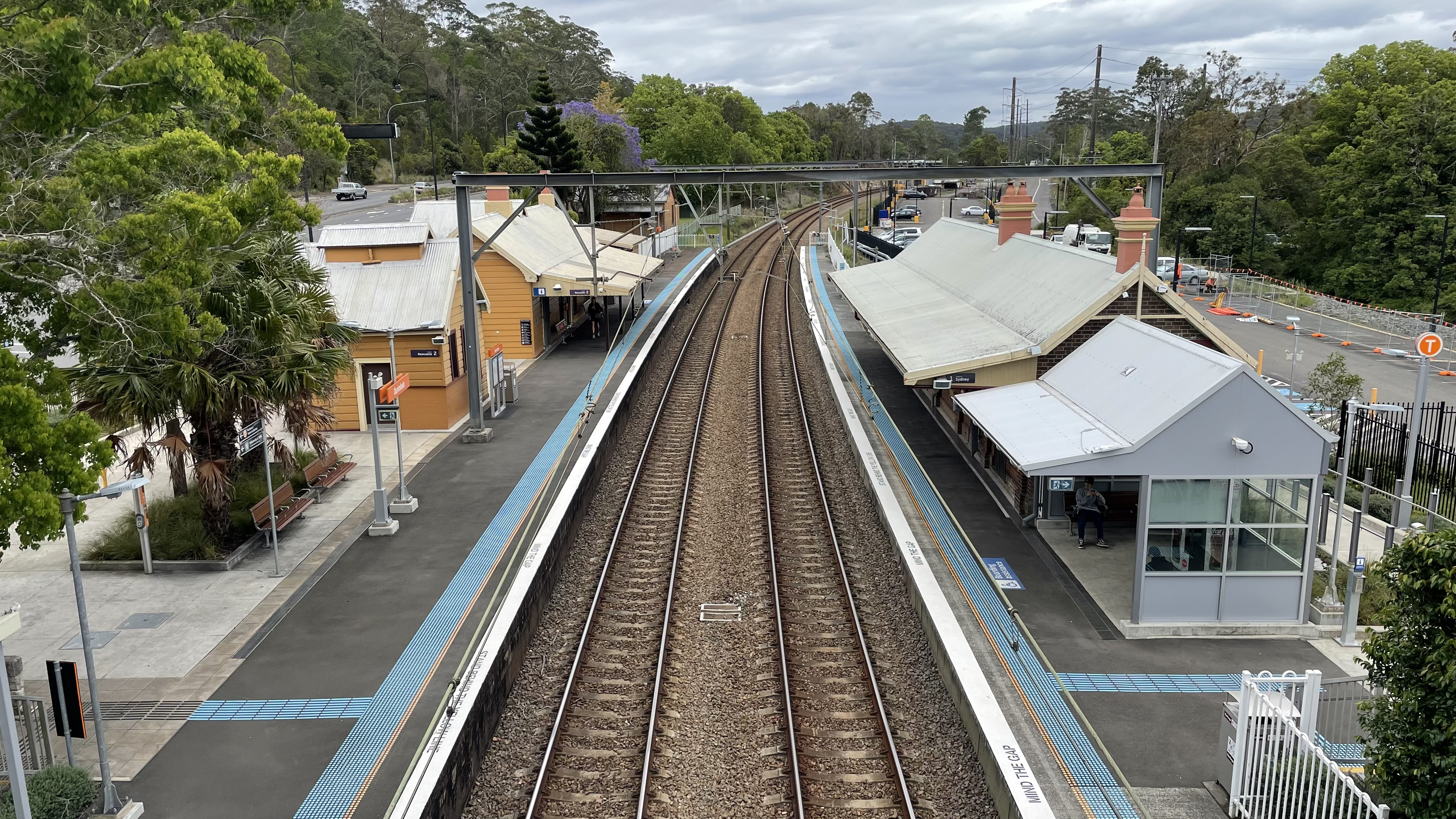
- Northbound view of the station platforms, November 2023

General information
- Location: Old Pacific Highway, Ourimbah; Australia
- Coordinates: 33°21′35″S 151°22′12″E
- Elevation: 24 metres (79 ft)
- Owner: Transport Asset Manager of New South Wales
- Operator: Sydney Trains
- Line: Main Northern
- Distance: 90.61 km (56.30 mi) from Central
- Platforms: 2 side
- Tracks: 2
- Connections: Bus

Construction
- Structure type: Ground
- Accessible: Yes

Other information
- Status: Weekdays: Staffed: 6am to 2pm: Weekends and public holidays: Unstaffed
- Station code: OUR
- Website: Transport for NSW

History
- Opened: 15 August 1887; 139 years ago

Passengers
- 2025: 89,606 (year); 245 (daily) (Sydney Trains, NSW TrainLink)

Services
Preceding station	Intercity Trains	Following station
Tuggerah towards Newcastle Interchange	Central Coast & Newcastle Line	Lisarow towards Central
Location

Ourimbah railway station is a heritage-listed railway station located on the Main Northern line in New South Wales, Australia. It serves the northern Central Coast suburb of Ourimbah opening on 15 August 1887. The station had passing loops and a freight yard that were removed in March 1993.

The station was upgraded with lifts added in August 2021.

== Platforms and services ==
Ourimbah has two side platforms. It is serviced by Sydney Trains Intercity Central Coast & Newcastle Line with services travelling between Sydney Central, Wyong & Newcastle via Strathfield, as well as limited services between Newcastle & Gosford. There are 3 weekday morning peak hour services from Wyong to Sydney Central via Gordon.

Platform	Line	Stopping pattern	Notes
1	CCN	Services to Gosford & Sydney Central via Strathfield	
1	CCN	3 Weekday morning peak hour services to Sydney Central via Gordon	
2	CCN	Services to Wyong & Newcastle	

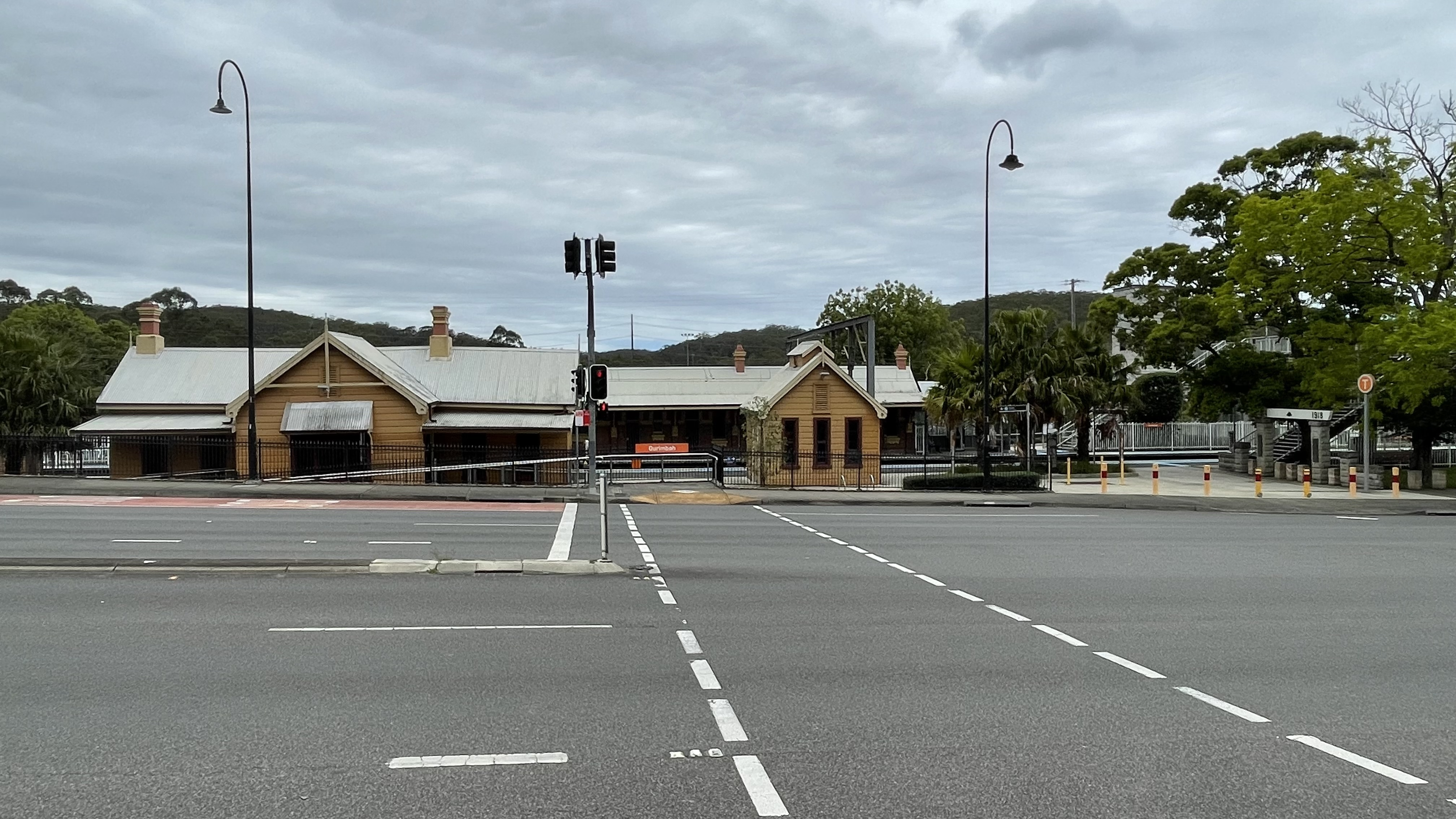
Entrance on Pacific Highway

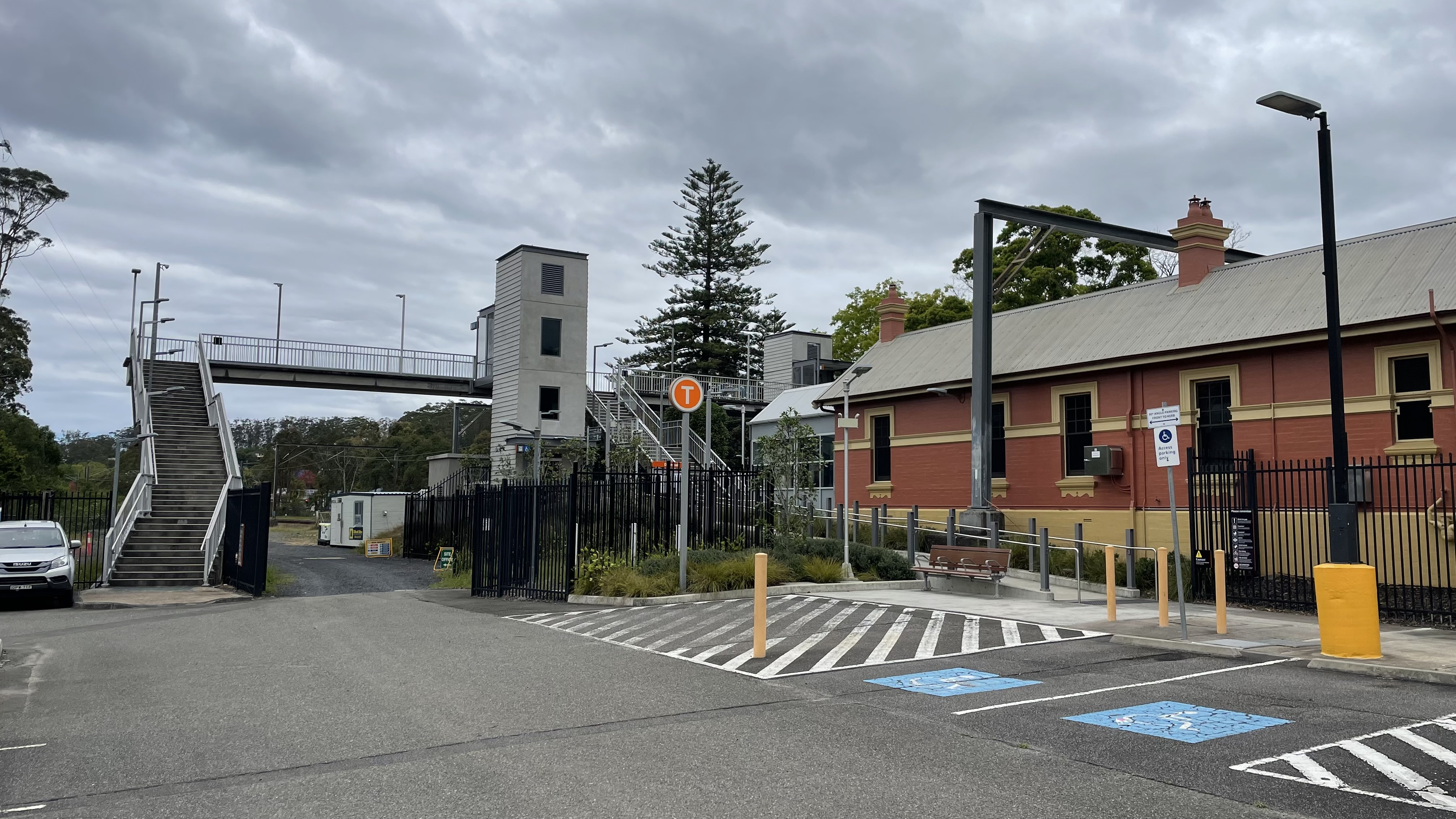
Entrance on Mill Street

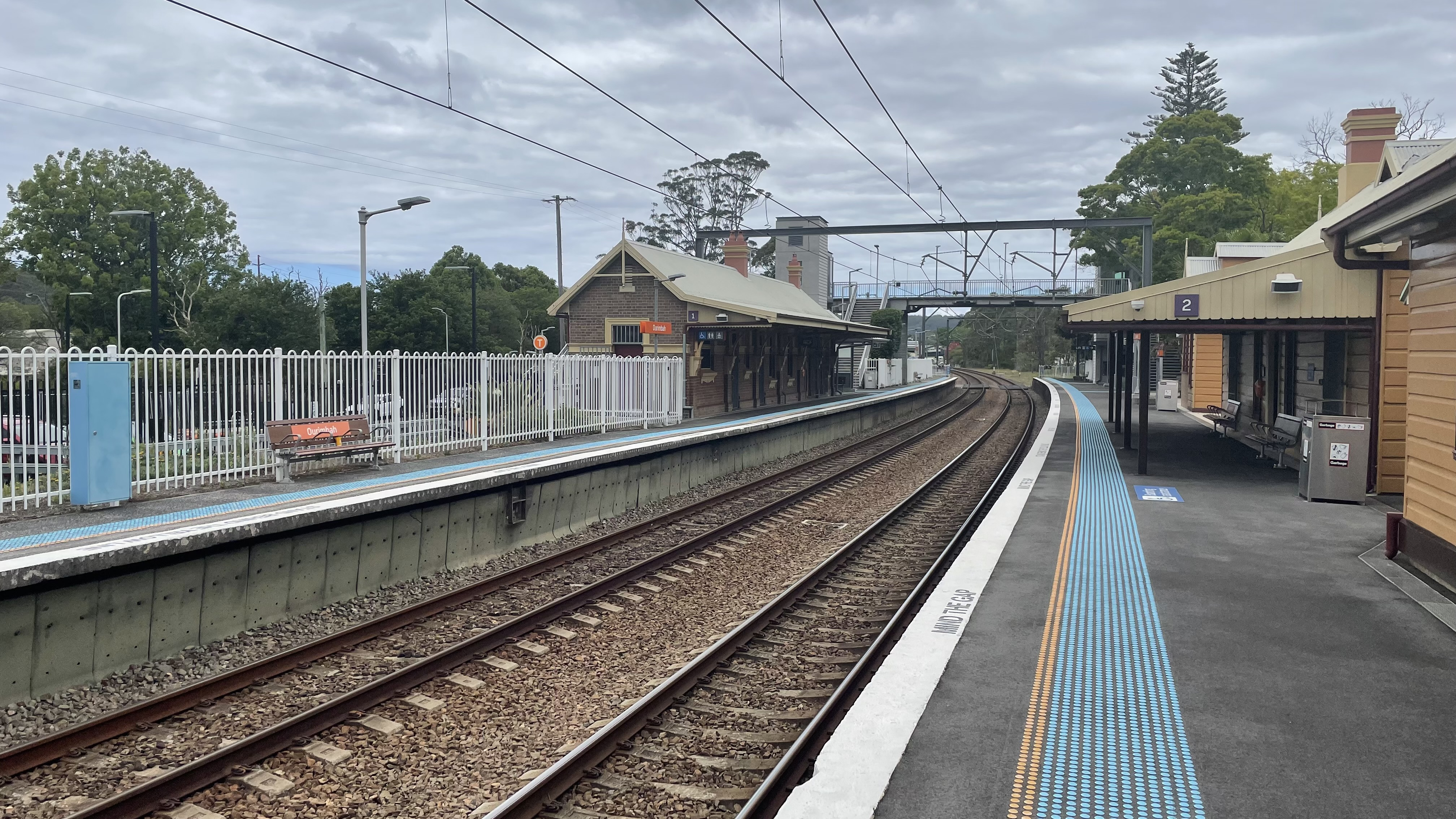
Southbound view from Platform 2

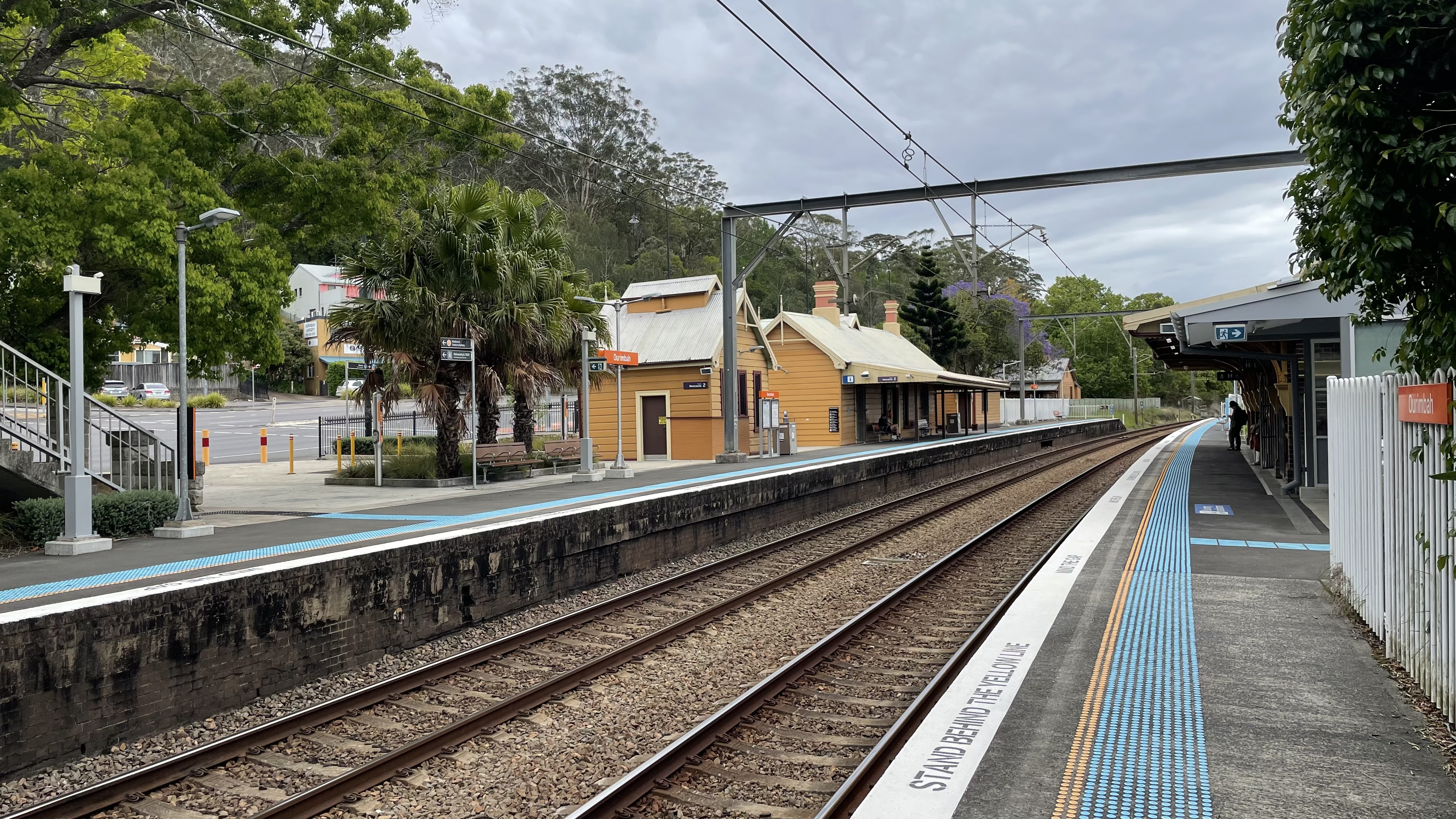
Northbound view from Platform 1

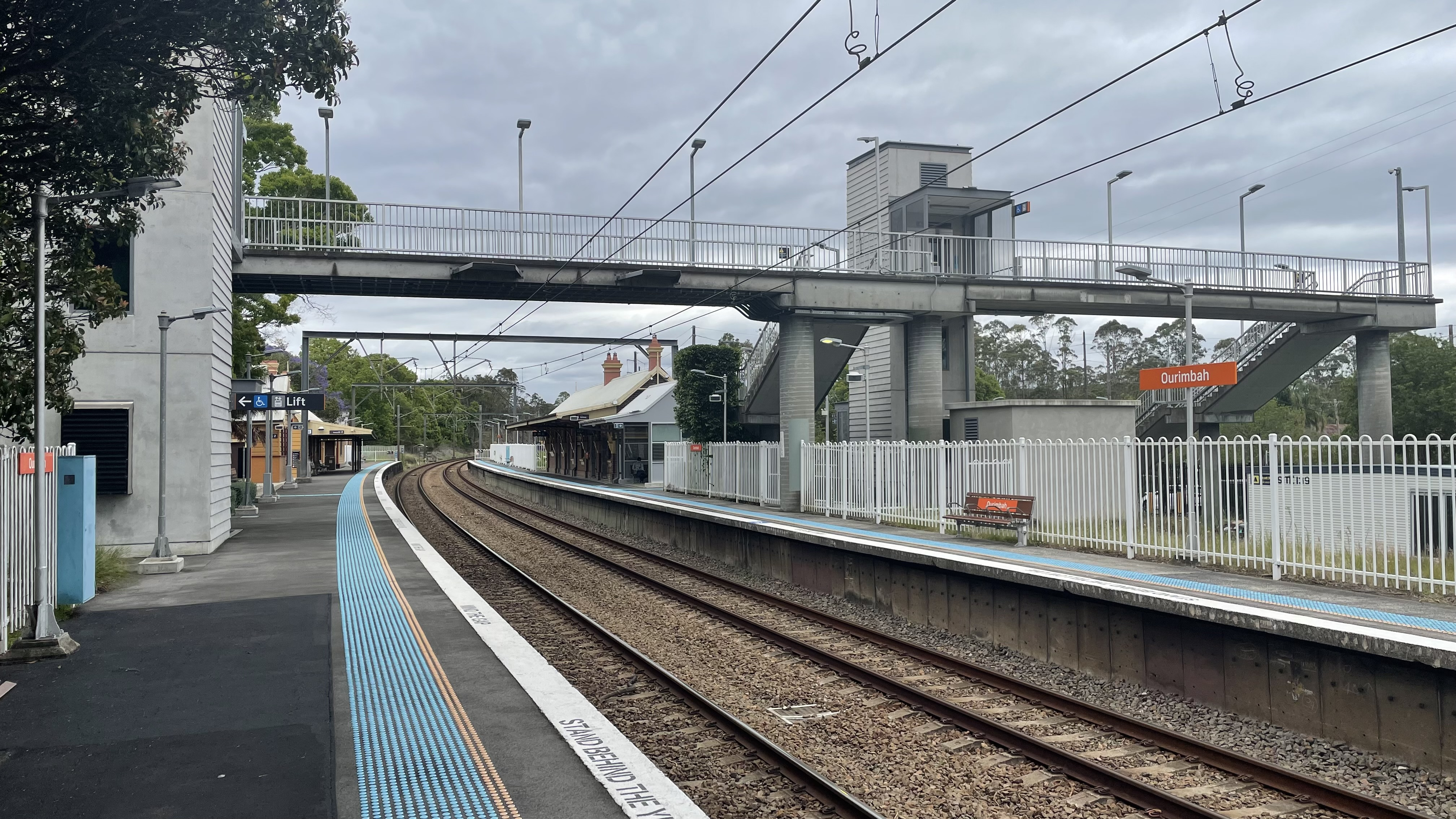
Lifts and overheard concourse

== Transport links ==
Busways operates two bus routes via Ourimbah station, under contract to Transport for NSW:

- 36: Gosford station to Westfield Tuggerah via Narara
- 37: Gosford station to Westfield Tuggerah via Wyoming

Red Bus Services operates one bus route via Ourimbah station, under contract to Transport for NSW:

- 47: Stockland Bay Village to Wyong station
