= Niagara Park railway station =

Railway station in New South Wales, Australia

Niagara Park
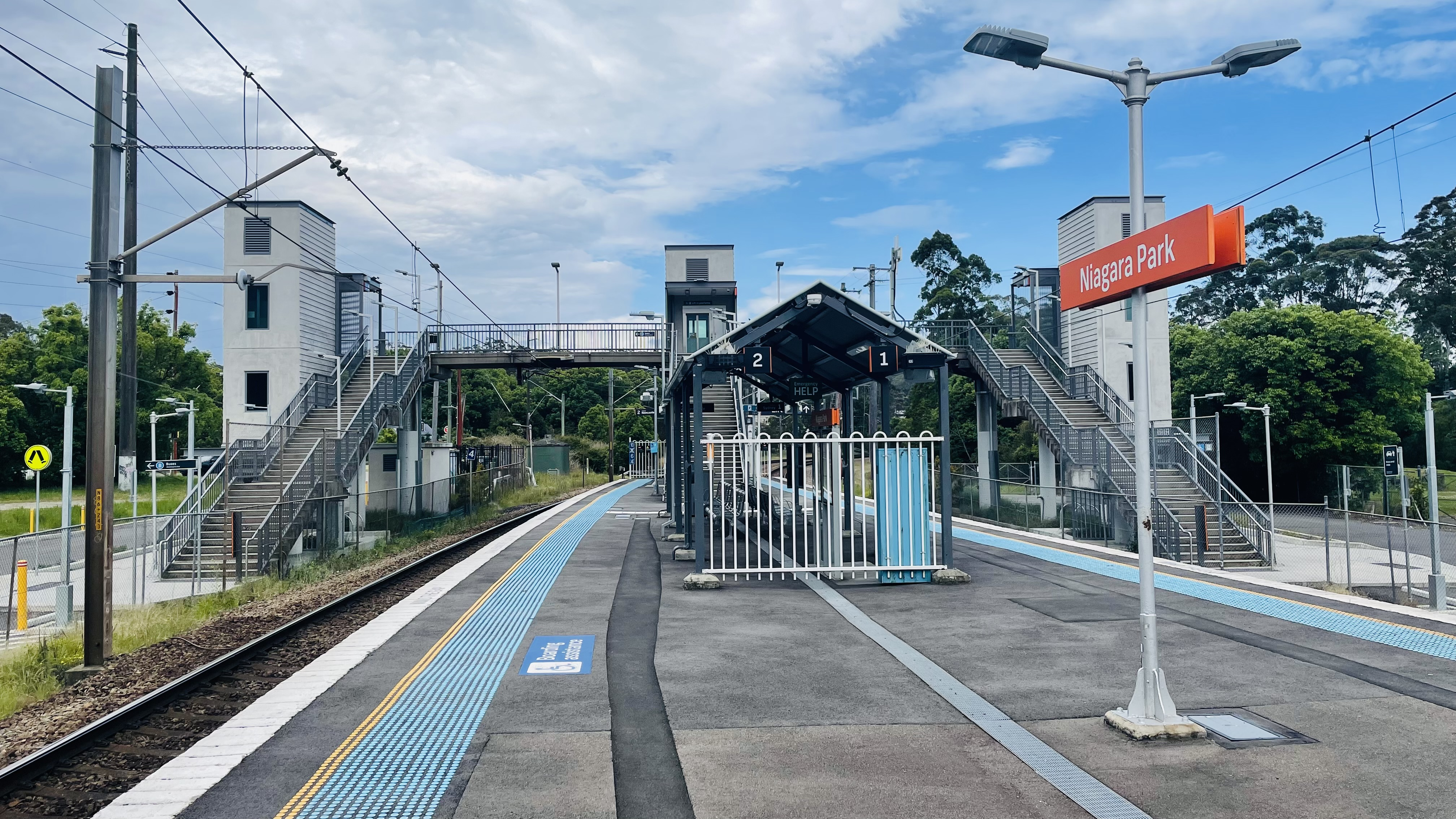
- North-east bound view from Platform 2, November 2022

General information
- Location: Kathleen Morreau Road, Niagara Park; Australia
- Coordinates: 33°23′00″S 151°21′15″E
- Elevation: 18 metres (59 ft)
- Owner: Transport Asset Manager of New South Wales
- Operator: Sydney Trains
- Line: Main Northern
- Distance: 86.19 km (53.56 mi) from Central
- Platforms: 2 (1 island)
- Tracks: 2
- Connections: Bus

Construction
- Structure type: Ground
- Accessible: Yes

Other information
- Station code: NIA
- Website: Transport for NSW

History
- Opened: October 1902; 123 years ago
- Former names: Tundula (1902)

Passengers
- 2025: 49,046 (year); 134 (daily) (Sydney Trains, NSW TrainLink)

Services
Preceding station	Intercity Trains	Following station
Lisarow towards Newcastle Interchange	Central Coast & Newcastle Line	Narara towards Central
Location

Niagara Park railway station is located on the Main Northern line in New South Wales, Australia. It serves the northern Central Coast suburb of Niagara Park opening in October 1902 as Tundula. On 27 November 1902 it was renamed Niagara Park.

The station was upgraded in August 2021 with lifts added to the existing footbridge.

== Platforms and services ==
Niagara Park has one island platform with two faces. It is serviced by Sydney Trains Intercity Central Coast & Newcastle Line services travelling between Sydney Central, Wyong and Newcastle.

Platform	Line	Stopping pattern	Notes
1	CCN	Services to Gosford & Sydney Central	
2	CCN	Services to Wyong & Newcastle	

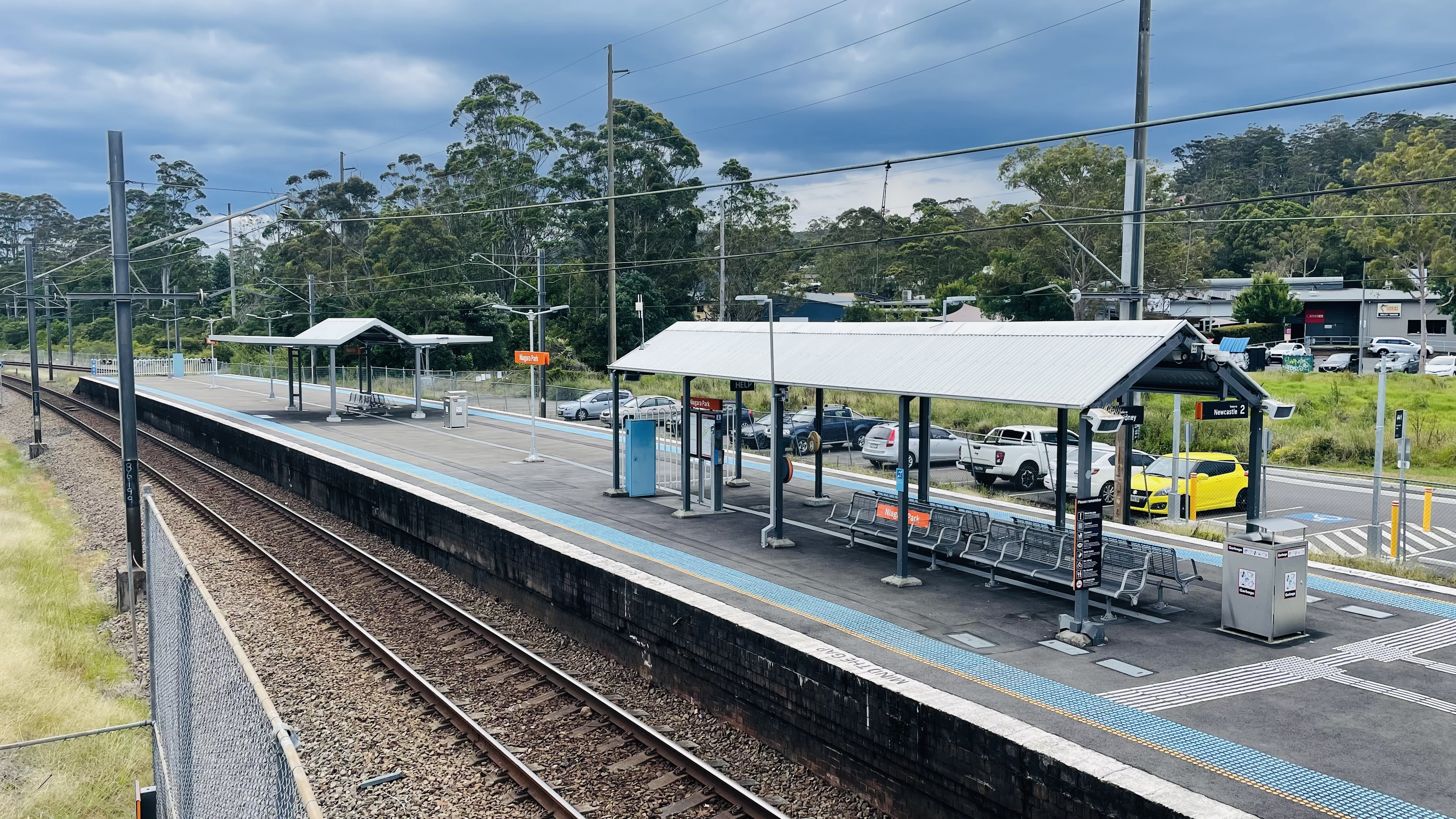
Southbound view

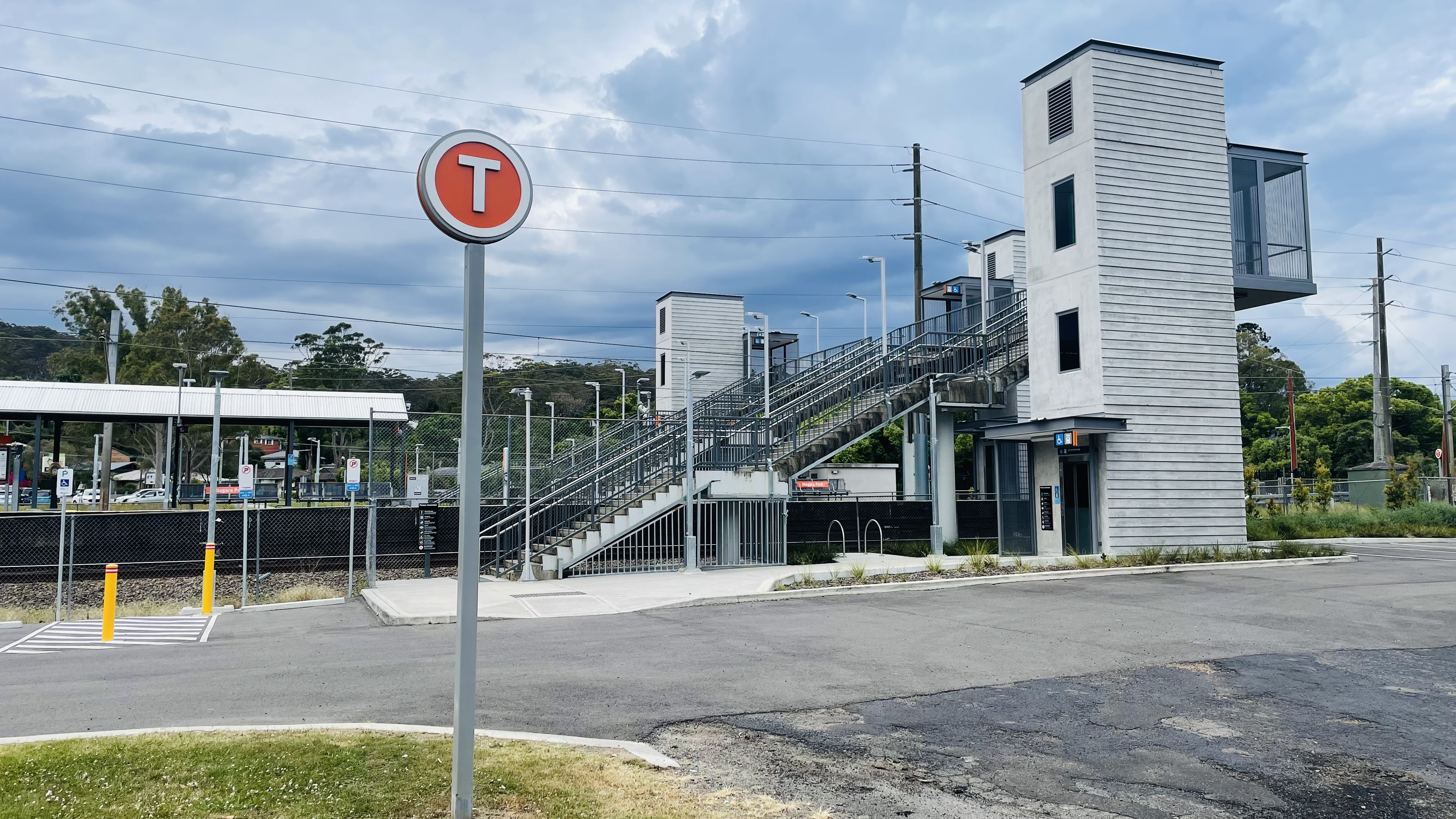
Entrance on Kathleen Morreau Road

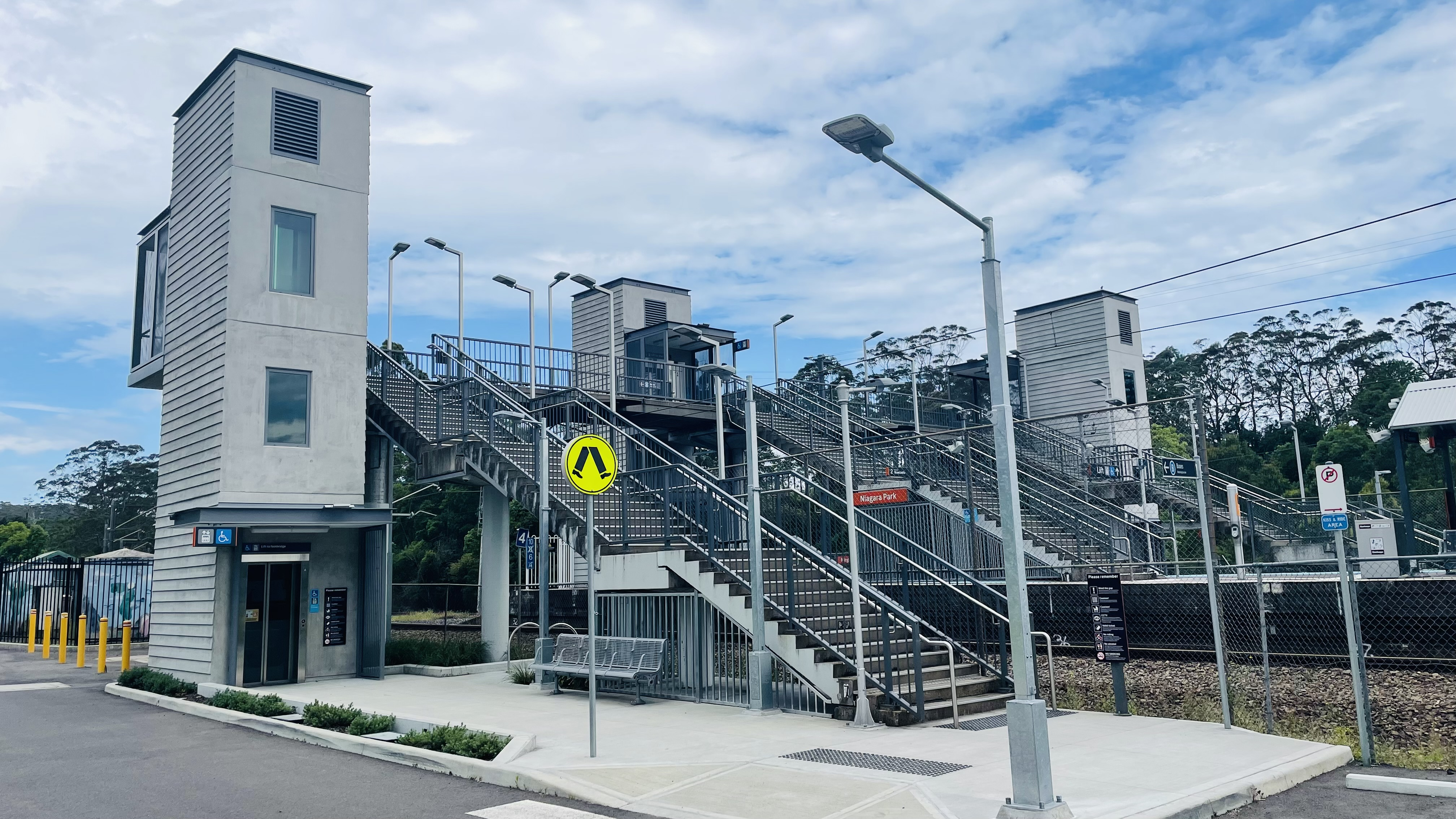
Entrance on Washington Ave

== Transport links ==
Busways operates two bus routes via Niagara Park station, under contract to Transport for NSW:

- 36: Gosford station to Westfield Tuggerah via Narara
- 37: Gosford station to Westfield Tuggerah via Wyoming
