= Narara Music Festival =

The Narara Music Festival was an outdoor music festival held on the Central Coast of New South Wales, Australia in 1983 and 1984. Despite the name, it was actually held at Somersby, a short distance from Narara. Narara is the original clan name of the local Darkinjung people

== 1983 ==
The 1983 concert ran over the Australia Day long weekend, from Friday 28th to Monday 31 January 1983. The event featured an all Australian music bill and comedian Austen Tayshus as M.C.

Australian bands and artists that appeared at the event include:

- INXS
- Men at Work
- Cold Chisel
- The Angels
- The Choirboys
- Uncanny X-Men
- The Church
- Australian Crawl
- Margret Roadknight
- No Fixed Address

Between 30,000 and 45,000 people are believed to have attended this concert. A significant portion of the concertgoers were stranded at Narara railway station, believing the concert was being held in Narara. Most of these people were forced to commute to Somersby via taxis.

A highlight of the event was The Angels playing with a blood red full moon rising over the stage behind them. They performed 11 songs at the concert, which were released as an album titled "Live at Narara".

The songs on this album are:

1. Coming Down
2. Eat City
3. Mr Damage
4. Stand Up
5. No Secrets
6. Take A Long Line
7. After The Rain
8. Shoot It Up
9. Shadow Boxer
10. Is That You
11. Marseilles

This album was released on VHS in 1988, and has also been released on DVD.

INXS put on a show-stopping performance, and a fan presented Michael Hutchence with a baby lamb.

== 1984 ==
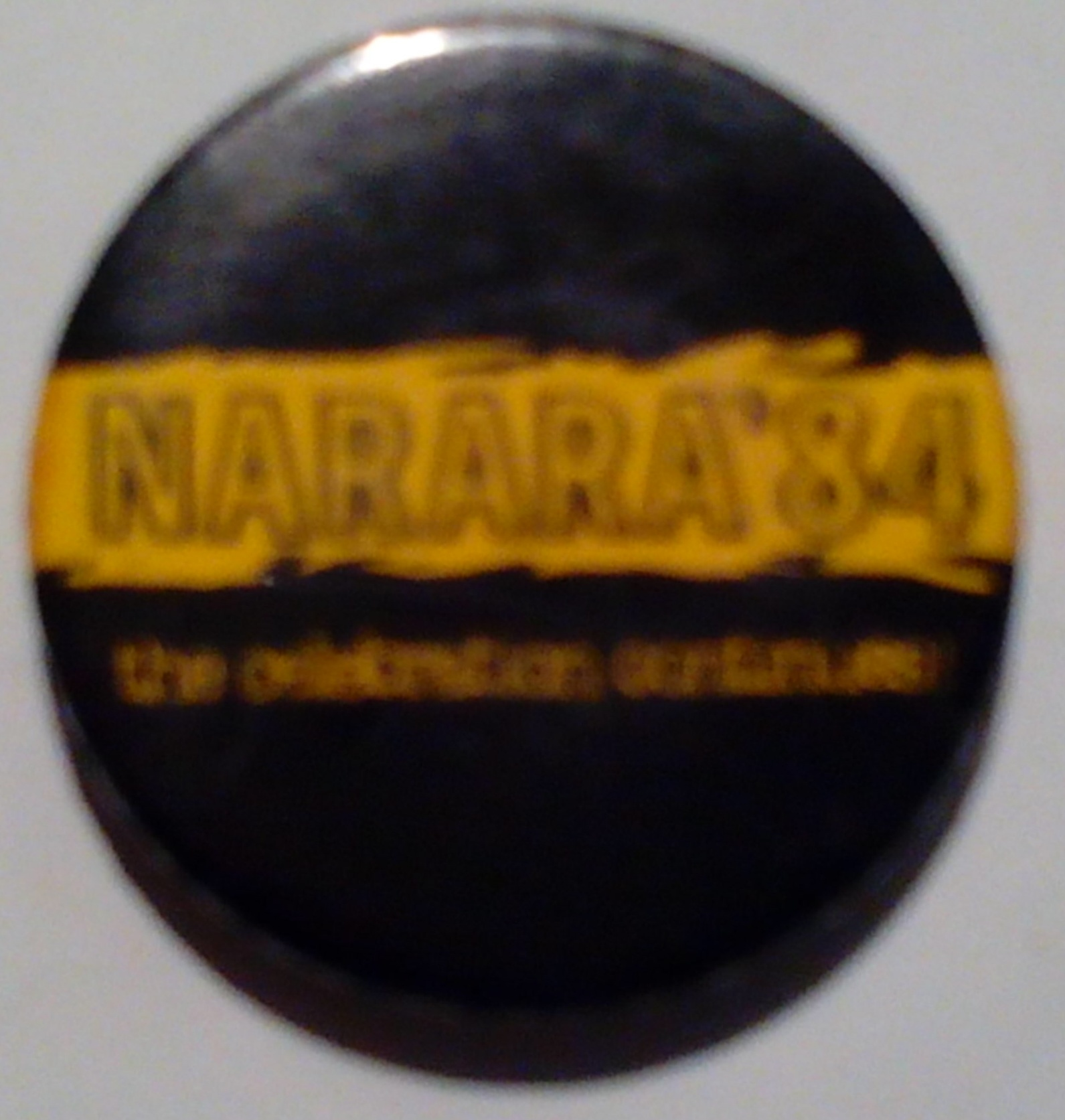
Narara '84 badge. Small text reads "the celebaration continues!"

In 1984 the festival returned for a second year, and also ran over the Australia Day weekend, this time from Friday 27th to Monday 30 January. Peter Sjoquist AM was involved with the organisation of the festival. Austen Tayshus was once again the M.C., and comedians Rodney Rude and George Smillovici made guest appearances.

Due to poor weather, and a mismatched international bill of artists, the numbers were down on the previous concert. Tickets were $40 in advance or $50 at the gate, and $20 for children aged 7–12.

Some international artists that appeared at the event include:

- Simple Minds
- The Pretenders
- Talking Heads"The beat goes on", by Bernard Zuel, The Sydney Morning Herald, 28 November 2003, retrieved 16 December 2005
- Annie Lennox / Eurythmics
- Def Leppard

Def Leppard played on the Sunday night, and were not well received by a crowd frustrated from the long delays and incessant rain. Many one litre plastic bottles, used to sell beer in but were filled with muddy water, were thrown onto the stage and at the band.

=== Official Programme ===
==== Friday 27 January ====
- Party Girls
- Eurogliders
- Real Life
- Eurythmics
- Simple Minds
- Mondo Rock

==== Saturday 28 January ====
From 11 am

- QED
- Zarsoff Bros
- The Johnnys
- Kids in the Kitchen
- Hoodoo Gurus
- Machinations

Break from 5 pm

- Sandii & the Sunsetz
- Models
- INXS
- The Pretenders
- Talking Heads
- Mental As Anything

==== Sunday 29 January ====
From 11 am

- Drop Bears
- Deckchairs Overboard
- Strange Tennants
- The Expression
- Dynamic Hepnotics
- Little Heroes

Break from 5 pm

- Sunnyboys
- Jon English & The Foster Bros.
- Def Leppard
- The Radiators
- Australian Crawl
- Allniters

==== Monday 30 January ====
- Mighty Guys
- Celibate Rifles
- Avion
