= Niagara Park, New South Wales =

Niagara Park
- Suburb
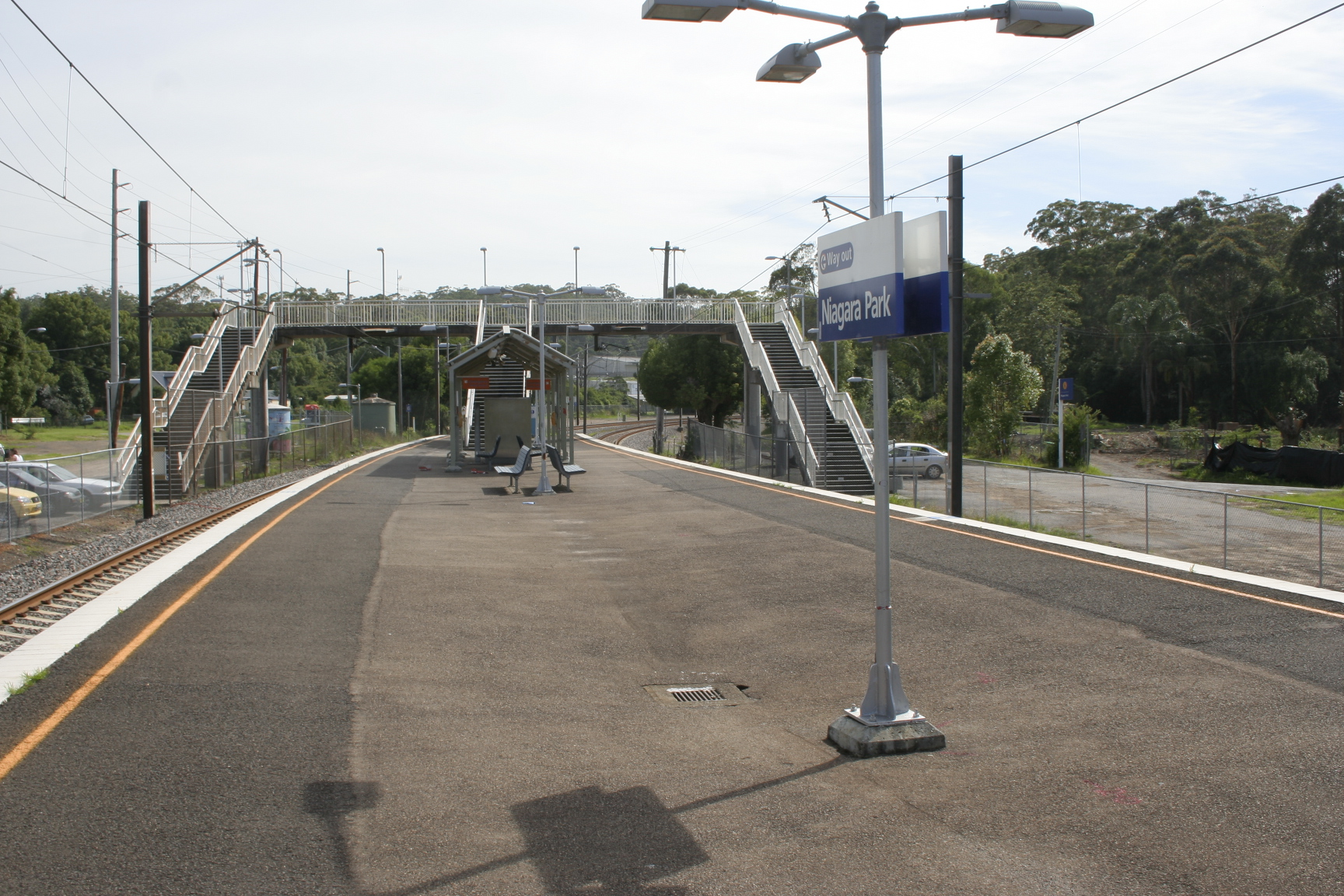
- Niagara Park Station

- Interactive map of Niagara Park
- Coordinates: 33°22′55″S 151°21′04″E
- Country: Australia
- State: New South Wales
- City: Central Coast
- LGA: Central Coast Council
- Location: 6 km (3.7 mi) N of Gosford; 80 km (50 mi) S of Newcastle; 15 km (9.3 mi) SSW of Wyong; 80 km (50 mi) N of Sydney; 20 km (12 mi) WSW of The Entrance

Government
  - State electorate: The Entrance
  - Federal division: Robertson

Area
  - Total: 2.4 km^{2} (0.93 sq mi)
- Elevation: 23 m (75 ft)

Population
  - Total: 2,743 (2016 census)
  - Density: 1,143/km^{2} (2,960/sq mi)
- Postcode: 2250
- Parish: Gosford
Suburbs around Niagara Park
	Ourimbah
Somersby	Niagara Park	Lisarow
Narara	Wyoming	Lisarow

Niagara Park is a suburb of the Central Coast region of New South Wales, Australia 6 kilometres (4 mi) north of Gosford's central business district. It is part of the Central Coast Council local government area. It consists of residential housing as well as acreage blocks and small farms with many houses backing onto natural bushland and reserves. Almost one third of the suburb includes the Siletta Road Bush Reserve, which joins the Strickland State Forest to the west. A variety of native birds and animals have been seen in the bushland areas by local residents, including lyrebirds. It is close to the M1 and is 20 minutes from Shelly Beach.

The suburb contains Niagara Park railway station, which is on the Main North railway line. A shopping centre, timber mill, primary school, and sports centre are also located within Niagara Park.

== History ==
The suburb took its name from a farm, which was owned by Mr. Measure, an American landowner who named the farm after Niagara Falls. Niagara Park railway station was opened in October 1902 with the name Tundula and was later changed to its current name on 27 November.

== Events ==
On the second Saturday of every month a large market is held at the shopping centre where residents set up tables selling various goods. There are also competitions for children held by the town crier.

A jobs convention is held annually at the local youth centre for students from various schools. The event is aimed at years 11 and 12.

Every year there is a large fete held at the local Niagara Park Primary School which features many rides and in the hall there are many baked goods stores.

== Notable residents ==
- Julie Goodwin, chef, won the first Australian Masterchef
