= Palm Grove =

- Suburb
- Interactive map of Palm Grove
- Coordinates: 33°19′26″S 151°18′36″E
- Country: Australia
- State: New South Wales
- City: Central Coast
- LGA: Central Coast Council
- Location: 14 km (8.7 mi) SW of Wyong; 16 km (9.9 mi) NNW of Gosford

Government
  - State electorates: Wyong; Gosford
  - Federal division: Dobell
- Postcode: 2258
- Parish: Ourimbah

Palm Grove is a suburb of the Central Coast region of New South Wales, Australia. It is located about 10 kilometres (6 mi) upstream along Ourimbah Creek from the town of Ourimbah. It is part of the Central Coast Council local government area.
