= Ourimbah =

- Suburb
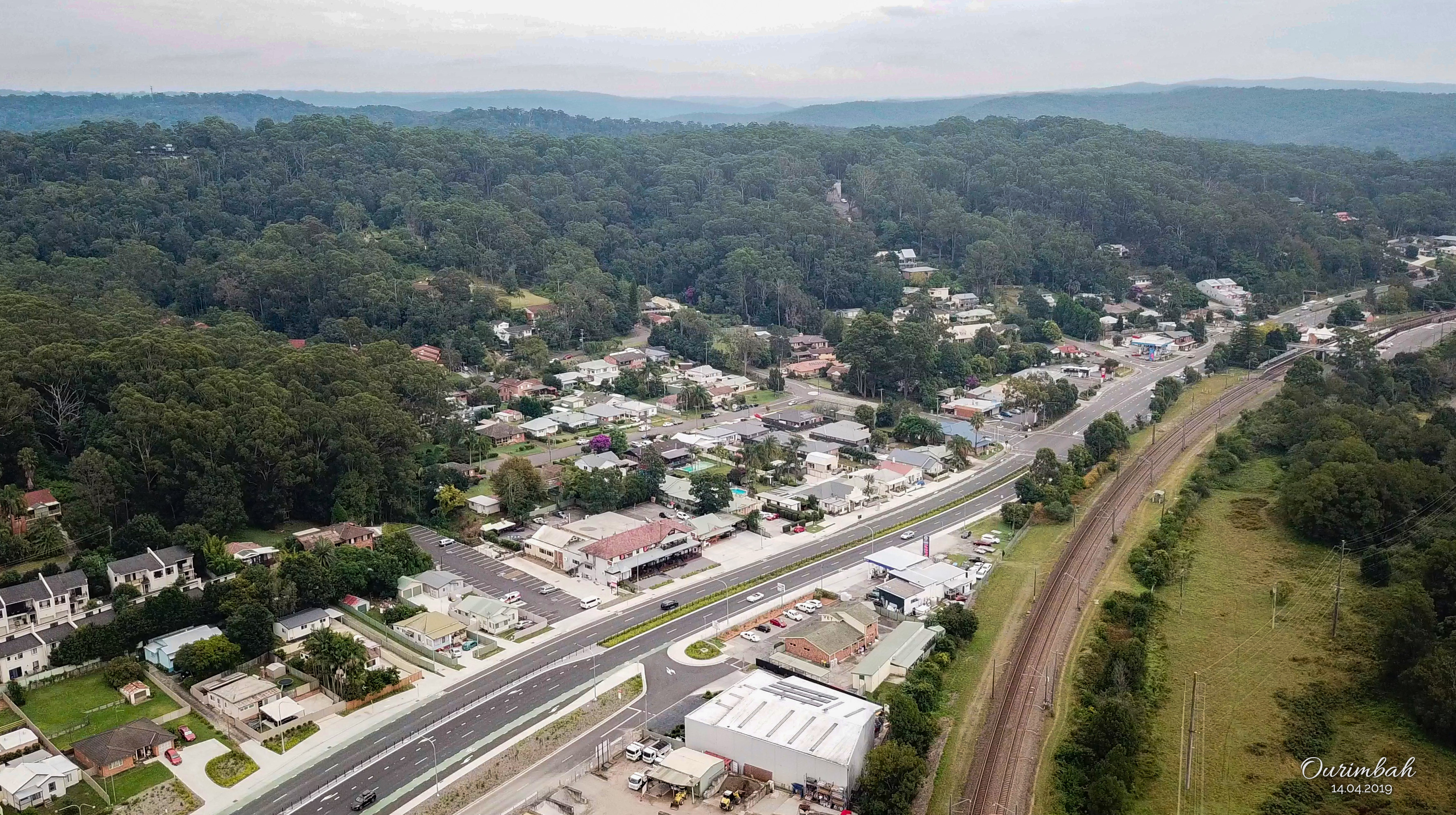
- Aerial shot of Ourimbah in April 2019

- Interactive map of Ourimbah
- Coordinates: 33°21′54″S 151°22′5″E
- Country: Australia
- State: New South Wales
- City: Central Coast
- LGA: Central Coast Council
- Location: 77 km (48 mi) S of Newcastle; 11 km (6.8 mi) SSW of Wyong; 12 km (7.5 mi) NNE of Gosford; 78 km (48 mi) N of Sydney; 17 km (11 mi) W of The Entrance

Government
  - State electorates: The Entrance; Wyong
  - Federal division: Dobell
- Elevation: 37 m (121 ft)

Population
  - Total: 3,951 (2016 census)
- Postcode: 2258
- Parish: Ourimbah
Suburbs around Ourimbah
Palmdale	Palmdale	Kangy Angy
Palm Grove	Ourimbah	Fountaindale
Somersby	Lisarow	Glenning Valley

Ourimbah (/ɔːrɪmbɑː/) is a small township in the Central Coast region of New South Wales, Australia, located about 78 kilometres (48 mi) north of the state capital Sydney. Ourimbah is located approximately halfway between Sydney and Newcastle. The township today consists of small scattered local shops and businesses along the Pacific Highway, as well as the Central Coast campus of the University of Newcastle. Ourimbah had a population of 3,951 at the 2016 census.

== History ==
The Aboriginal word "Oorin" meaning "Belt of manhood" in which a stone axe was carried on hunting expeditions, and "Oorinbah" which is the bora ring or ceremonial ground in which the initiation ceremony of conferring the "belt of manhood" was carried out is where the name for Ourimbah originates from. Ourimbah was also known as 'Blue Gum Flats' which is what the school was called. The name of Ourimbah was universally adopted for the School, Post Office, Railway and Township in the late 19th century, as well as for Ourimbah Creek that skirts the north of the town.

There are many sites around Ourimbah which provide evidence of Aboriginal occupation. These include axe grinding grooves, archaeological deposits of campfires and food scraps, cave art, as well as many stone implements which have been purloined by museums and privateers.

Blue Gum Flat Public School (Ourimbah Public School) was built in 1863 on the site of the present railway station. In 1886 the school was moved to the opposite side of the road and a wooden building constructed. Ourimbah railway station was built in the same year and opened on 15 August 1887 and was the only station other than Narara between Gosford and Wyong at this time.

The relocation of the school and construction of the railway provided the opportunity for the subdivision of land into "town-size" allotments and the creation at Ourimbah of a townscape at first dubbed "Beckford". An area had previously been earmarked for a township to the north of this planned subdivision.

The town of Ourimbah, with its blue gums, blackbutts, round leaved gum, spotted gum and white mahogany trees, was an ideal place for the milling of timber to support a Sydney building boom between 1840 and 1870. The 1840s saw a major growth of population in the Ourimbah area. Attracted by the availability of work cutting timber, a great number of young couples moved all through the Central Coast, gradually forming settlements at which many began to put down roots.

While the timber supply thinned out, other means such as Citrus fruit and dairy farming restored the fortunes of Ourimbah. Later, in the 1950s it was realised that the dairy industry could not survive. The citrus farmers found themselves in a similar bind, unable to match the economies of scale available to producers elsewhere.

On the Australia Day long weekend in January 1970, Ourimbah was the venue for Australia's first major rock festival, the "Pilgrimage For Pop", which drew 11,000 fans.

The early 1970s land boom, which saw much land redeveloped into smaller holdings, was the end of any serious potential for farming as a means of supporting a family in Ourimbah. Land use once again changed, with pockets of urban development amongst the acreages, themselves now valuable for the leisure opportunities they offered rather than as agricultural holdings.

== Education ==
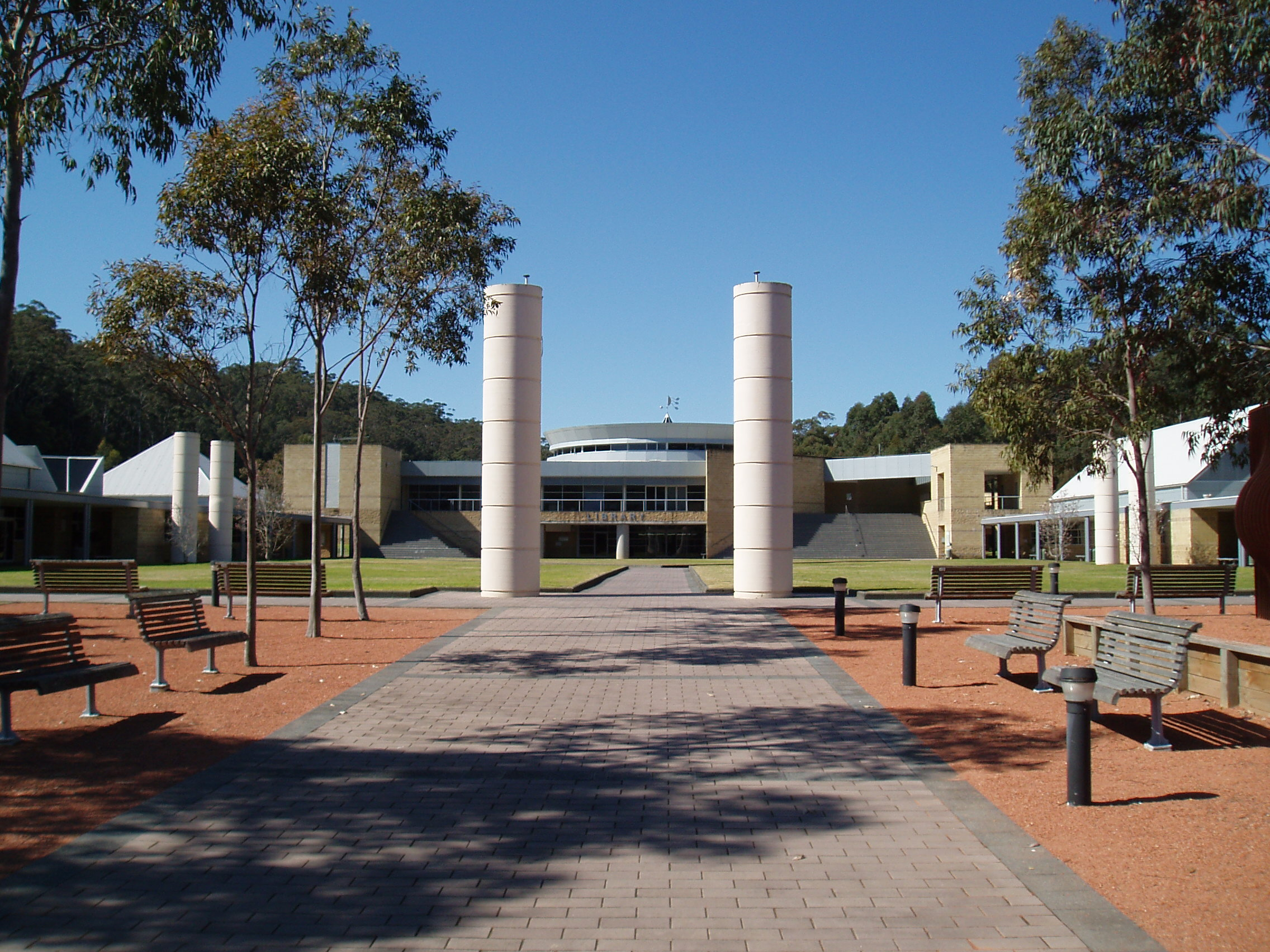
Entrance of the University of Newcastle, Central Coast Campus.

Ourimbah Public School is the oldest school on the Central Coast, opening in 1863 as Blue Gum Flat School. It continues to grow and change from its once small stable rural environment to its present rapidly expanding urban environment.

The University of Newcastle has a campus at Ourimbah through a multi-sector co-located partnership of the University and TAFE NSW – Hunter Institute. The Ourimbah campus offers University, TAFE and Community College programmes and courses on one site so that students can take advantage of pathways between levels and sectors of education and training. Affiliates are the Central Coast Community College and the Central Coast Conservatorium of Music. The University of Newcastle commenced teaching at the Ourimbah Campus, also known as the Central Coast Campus, in 1989.

Campus Central is the Ourimbah Campus student association. Campus Central has been operating as an independent student organisation at the Ourimbah Campus since 1994. Campus Central has retained autonomy through the VSU (Voluntary Student Unionism) legislation changes, and continues to provide services to students, members and the Campus community.

== Historical sites and heritage listed buildings ==
- Sawmill (R. Brownlee & Co.) – Brownlee Street
- Utility Structure – No. 1A Jaques Street
- Dwelling – No. 23 Chittaway Road
- Dwelling (Former Post Office) – Ourimbah Creek Road
- Primary School – No. 121 Pacific Highway
- Railway Station – Pacific Highway
- Shop – No. 21 Pacific Highway
- World War 1 Monument – Pacific Highway
- Post Office and Residence – Station Street
- Dwelling – No. 100 Shirley Street

More information and photos can be found at wyongsc.nsw.gov.au

== Transport ==
Ourimbah railway station is situated on the Main Northern railway line. The Pacific Highway runs through its centre. It is part of the Central Coast Council local government area.

Major upgrades to the Pacific Highway occurred in 2007 by Roads & Maritime Services.

- Stage 1 – Lisarow to Ourimbah

Upgrading the intersection of the Pacific Highway and Dog Trap Road at Ourimbah:

- Stage 2 – Lisarow to Ourimbah

Upgrading the Pacific Highway between Glen Road and Burns Road:

- Stage 3 – Lisarow to Ourimbah

== Symbol of Ourimbah ==
The magpie is commonly used as a symbol for Ourimbah. The black and white bird is featured in the logo of Ourimbah Public School. The school song references the magpie in its first verse, "Here lies Ourimbah nestled in a valley,/ Home of the magpie and blue gum tree" and in its repeating chorus, "home of the magpie colours black and white," referring to the school uniform colours.

The magpie symbol is used for many local sports teams: Ourimbah Rugby League Football Club, Lisarow Ourimbah Cricket Club, Ourimbah Netball Club, and Ourimbah Lisarow RSL Bowling Club.

== Historical images ==
- Looking South at Ourimbah, 1910
- Ourimbah Public School, 1910
- Peach Orchard Road, Ourimbah, 1912
- Ourimbah Sawmill, 1902
- Ourimbah Public School, 1910
- Burns Store, 1915
- Illustration of formed roads in and about Ourimbah, 1920
