= Lisarow =

Suburb in New South Wales, Australia

- Suburb
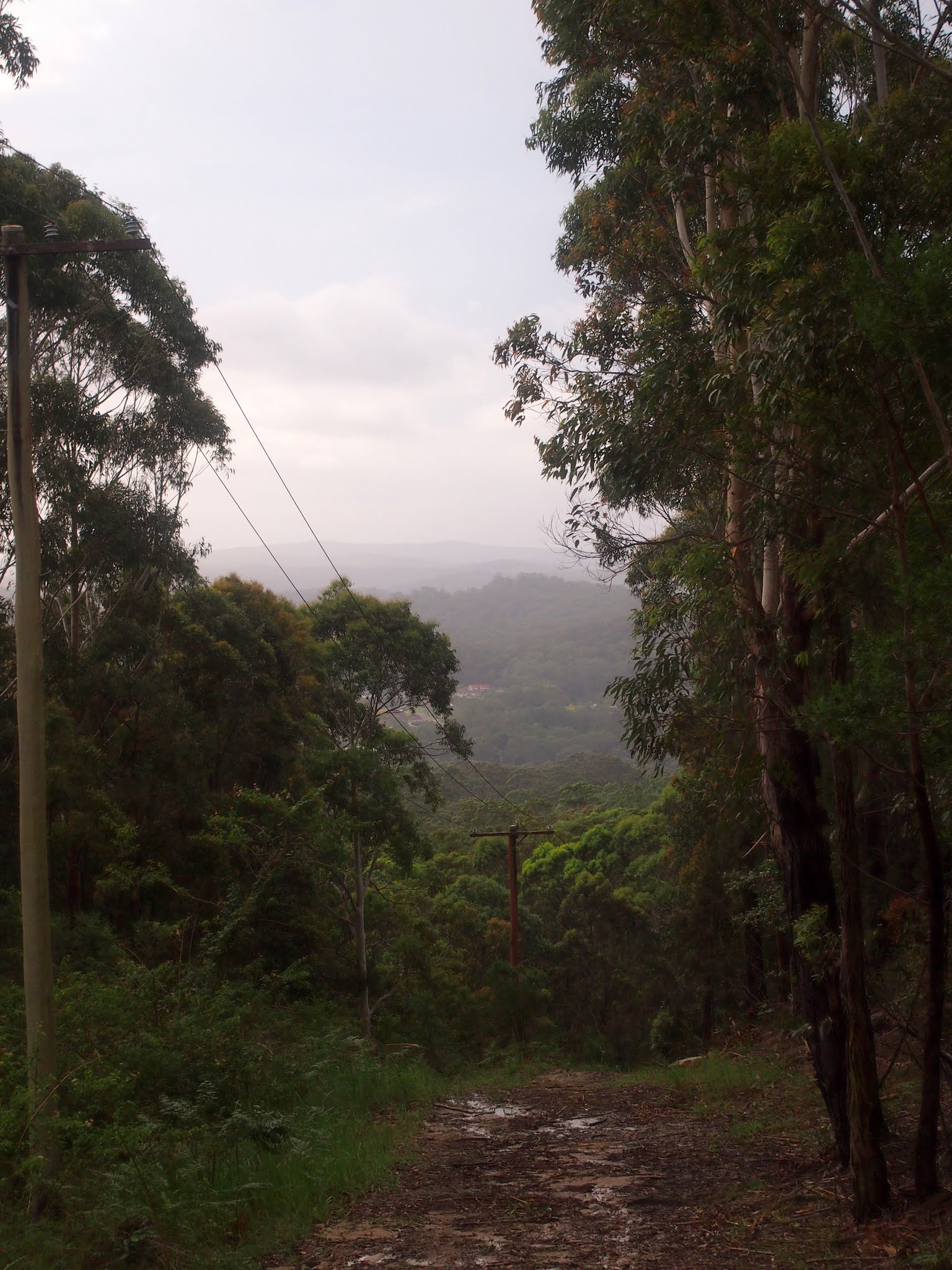

- Interactive map of Lisarow
- Coordinates: 33°22′55.2″S 151°22′33.6″E
- Country: Australia
- State: New South Wales
- Region: Central Coast
- LGA: Central Coast Council
- Location: 8 km (5.0 mi) NNE of Gosford; 79 km (49 mi) S of Newcastle; 14 km (8.7 mi) SSW of Wyong; 85 km (53 mi) N of Sydney; 18 km (11 mi) WSW of The Entrance

Government
  - State electorate: The Entrance
  - Federal division: Dobell

Area
  - Total: 12.2 km^{2} (4.7 sq mi)
- Elevation: 32 m (105 ft)

Population
  - Total: 5,136 (2016 census)
  - Density: 421.0/km^{2} (1,090/sq mi)
- Postcode: 2250
- Parish: Gosford
Suburbs around Lisarow
Ourimbah	Ourimbah	Tumbi Umbi
Niagara Park	Lisarow	Mount Elliot
Narara	Niagara Park	Mount Elliot

Lisarow (/lɪzəroʊ/) is a suburb of the Central Coast region of New South Wales, Australia, located 8 kilometres (5 mi) north-northeast of Gosford's central business district via the Pacific Highway. It is part of the Central Coast Council local government area.

The area was largely rural until urban encroachment in more recent decades. It is now a mainly residential area, composed of medium-density housing, with small rural properties on the fringes. There is also a substantial amount of industrial activity around the railway line and station.

Educational facilities in the suburb include Lisarow High School, Lisarow Public School and Narara Public School.

The Test cricketer, Alan Davidson, hails from the town. Lisarow shares the largest cricket club on the Central Coast with Ourimbah, their club mascot is the magpie.

The international arm of Sara Lee Corporation established its Australian plant in Lisarow in 1971. It had been taken over by McCain Foods, then in 2021 it was taken over by South Island Office, a New Zealand private equity company. On 18 October 2023, Sara Lee Holdings was placed into voluntary administration, with the administrator trying to run the business and continue to employ its 200 employees.
