= Narara Valley High School =

Location
- Narara, Central Coast, New South Wales; Australia
- Coordinates: 33°23′51″S 151°20′03″E

Information
- Type: Government-funded co-educational comprehensive secondary day school
- Motto: For the Future
- Established: 1995
- School district: Central Coast; Regional North
- Educational authority: New South Wales Department of Education
- Principal: Andrew Skehan
- Teaching staff: 65.4 FTE (2020)
- Years: 7–12
- Gender: Mixed
- Age range: 12 to 18
- Enrollment: 762 (2022)
- Student to teacher ratio: 11.9
- Campus type: Suburban
- Colours: Red and Silver
- Website: nararavaly-h.schools.nsw.gov.au

Narara Valley High School (abbreviated as NVHS) is a government-funded co-educational comprehensive secondary day school, located in Narara, in the Central Coast region of New South Wales, Australia.

The school caters for approximately 762 students in 2022, from year 7 to year 12, of whom eleven percent identified as Indigenous Australians and ten percent were from a language background other than English. The school is operated by the NSW Department of Education; and the current principal is Andrew Skehan.

== Extracurricular and co-curricular ==
=== Music ===
The school runs several music programs, including a selective creative and performing arts program and a concert band that frequently plays music at fund-raising events for the school and charity. Music classes are mandatory for all students enrolled in years 7 and 8, and the subject may be continued as an elective if a student wishes.

=== Academic acceleration program ===
Until 2018, the school ran an academic acceleration program for highly engaged students who were invited to join a modified class that aimed to complete the HSC a year earlier than the cohort they initially joined with. This class has since been discontinued, replaced by the STEP class at the beginning of 2018.

== See also ==
- List of government schools in New South Wales
- Education in Australia
