= Wyoming, New South Wales =

Wyoming
- Suburb
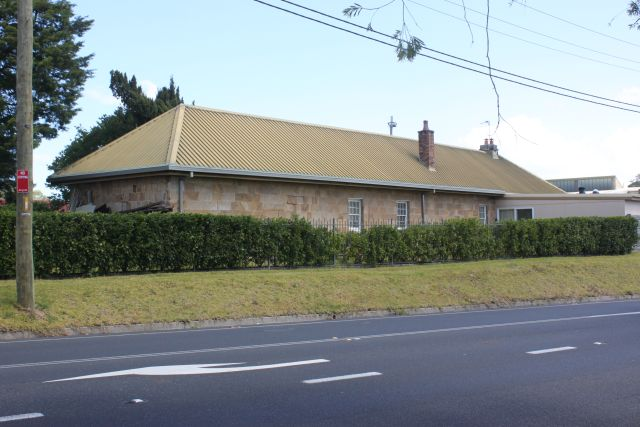
- The Grange restaurant, Renwick Street

- Interactive map of Wyoming
- Coordinates: 33.407°S 151.36°E
- Country: Australia
- State: New South Wales
- City: Central Coast
- LGA: Central Coast Council
- Location: 4 km (2.5 mi) NE of Gosford; 79 km (49 mi) N of Sydney; 23 km (14 mi) SW of The Entrance

Government
  - State electorate: The Entrance
  - Federal division: Dobell

Area
  - Total: 5.1 km^{2} (2.0 sq mi)
- Elevation: 18 m (59 ft)

Population
  - Total: 10,111 (2021 census)
  - Density: 1,983/km^{2} (5,130/sq mi)
- Postcode: 2250
- Parish: Gosford
Suburbs around Wyoming
Narara	Niagara Park	Lisarow
Narara	Wyoming	Mount Elliot
Gosford	North Gosford	Mount Elliot

Wyoming (/waɪoʊmɪŋ/) is a suburb of the Central Coast region of New South Wales, Australia, located 4 kilometres (2 mi) northeast of Gosford's central business district. It is part of the Central Coast Council local government area.

The Aboriginal inhabitants of the Wyoming area before European settlement were the Kuringgai people.

In 1824 Frederick Augustus Hely (1794–1836) purchased 1,340 acres (5.42 km^{2}) of land adjacent to Narara Reserve. Hely named the land after the Wyoming Valley of Pennsylvania, made famous by the 1809 poem Gertrude of Wyoming by Thomas Campbell.

Hely was the Principal Superintendent of Convicts. He was born in Ireland and died in Sydney. He died before the house he was planning to build at Wyoming was completed. His mausoleum lies beside the Pacific Highway at Wyoming, close to the family home which was built by his widow. The grave was designed by architect John Verge and was recently restored after falling into disrepair.

Wyoming is a predominantly residential suburb. The first building was the local pub which was built by convicts in 1854 and still exists today. Wyoming also has medical centres, three primary schools, the Wyoming Shopping Village, and a number of fast-food outlets, petrol stations and other shops. Wyoming is home to the football (soccer) club Wyoming Tigers, affiliated with Central Coast Football.

Many residential streets in the suburb are bordered by temperate-subtropical rainforest, with bushwalking opportunities.

== Demographics ==
According to the 2021 census, there were 10,111 people in Wyoming.

- Aboriginal and Torres Strait Islander people made up 5.0% of the population.
- 75.8% of people were born in Australia. The most common countries of birth were England 5.0%, New Zealand 2.0%, the Philippines 1.3%, India 1.0% and China (excluding SARs and Taiwan) 0.7%.
- 85.5% of people only spoke English at home. The next most common languages spoken at home were Korean 0.8%, Mandarin 0.7%, Tagalog 0.7%, Malayalam 0.6% and Spanish 0.5%.
- The most common responses for religion were No Religion 40.3%, Catholic 18.4%, Anglican 14.9% and Uniting Church 3.0%.

== Wyoming Shopping Village ==
Wyoming Shopping Village is a neighbourhood shopping complex in the suburb, catering for the needs of the residents, and houses a Coles supermarket. The complex was rebuilt in 2004.

== Wyoming Community Centre ==
Wyoming Community Centre is the Local Community Neighbourhood Centre. It is at 147 Maidens Brush Road and provides a wide range of services, activities and referrals for the local community. It is a not for profit organization.

== Heritage listings ==
Wyoming has a number of heritage-listed sites, including:

- Pacific Highway: Hely's Grave
- Pacific Highway: Wyoming Cottage
- Renwick Street: The Grange
