= Palmdale, New South Wales =

Palmdale Central Coast, New South Wales
- Coordinates: 33°19′55″S 151°22′5″E
- Population: 95 (SAL 2021)
- Postcode(s): 2258
- Location: 9 km (6 mi) SW of Wyong
- LGA(s): Central Coast Council
- Parish: Ourimbah
- State electorate(s): Wyong
- Federal division(s): Dobell

Palmdale is a suburb of the Central Coast region of New South Wales, Australia. It is part of the Central Coast Council local government area.

It is bounded on most sides by the Ourimbah State Forest, and is home to the Palmdale Memorial Park and Crematorium.
