= The Grange, Wyoming, New South Wales =

The Grange
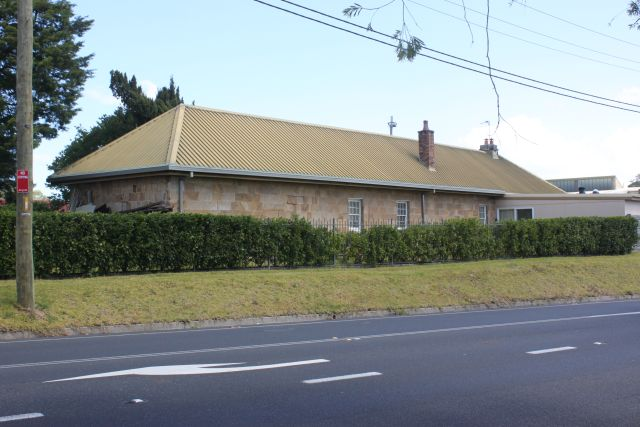

- Location within New South Wales Location within Australia
- 33.4038°S 151.3517°E
- Location: Renwick Street, Wyoming, Central Coast, New South Wales, Australia

Site notes
- Architect: John Verge (1832 additions)

New South Wales Heritage Register
- Official name: The Grange
- Type: state heritage (built)
- Designated: 2 April 1999
- Reference no.: 222
- Type: historic site

The Grange is a heritage-listed former stables and now residence at Renwick Street, Wyoming, Central Coast, New South Wales, Australia. It was designed by John Verge. It was added to the New South Wales State Heritage Register on 2 April 1999.

== History ==
The Grange was built as part of the Wyoming farm complex of Frederick Hely, principal Superintendent of Convicts in the colony of New South Wales from 1825 to 1836. It was originally built as the estate's stables, but was later converted into a residence.

The Grange is a long sandstone block structure built in 1836 with a short timber frame extension of recent vintage. The sandstone section was designed by John Verge in 1832. The stone construction is dry and the pit sawn cedar is mortised. The building was originally 100 meters long with four rooms and 7-10 stables of which only 3 survive. It is believed that dungeons were built below. The plan of the farmyard is extant and held by the Mitchell Library. Four rooms of the Grange correspond exactly to the plan, as does the stables area. The farmyard complex was never completed, perhaps due to the death of Hely in the year it was commenced. Frederick Hely was stationed in Sydney but hoped to retire to Brisbane Water (Gosford) where he secured a number of portions of land.

By 1825 he had established a farm called Wyoming (Wyoming Cottage) on 340 acres later known as Portion 200, Parish of Gosford, County of Northumberland. With the advantages of wealth and position, Hely was able to engage John Verge to design a house and farmyard. He was also able to select as his assigned servants, two professional stonemasons to assist with the building. The foundation stone of the Grange carries the date 1836 and the names of the two masons, W. and A. Sidebottom. It is located within the building, having been repositioned when a porch was added to the northern side in 1944 by the then owner Harry Rolph.

The name The Grange was given by yet another owner, Catherine Granger, who had title to the property between 1925 and 1939. The building is at present used as a house and has undergone substantial modification.

== Significance ==
The former Stable on Renwick Street at Wyoming has significance for its association with Frederick Augustus Hely, the colony's Principal Superintendent of Convicts and early landowner in the north Gosford region, after whose farm "Wyoming" the area was named. It has rare regional historic and social significance as one of the first buildings on the Central Coast, associated with the early settlement of the region. It has rare state historic aesthetic significance as a design by the architect John Verge, and as an early convict-built structure. It is the second oldest building in the Central Coast. Although modified, its significance has not been reduced and is an important streetscape element.

== Heritage listing ==
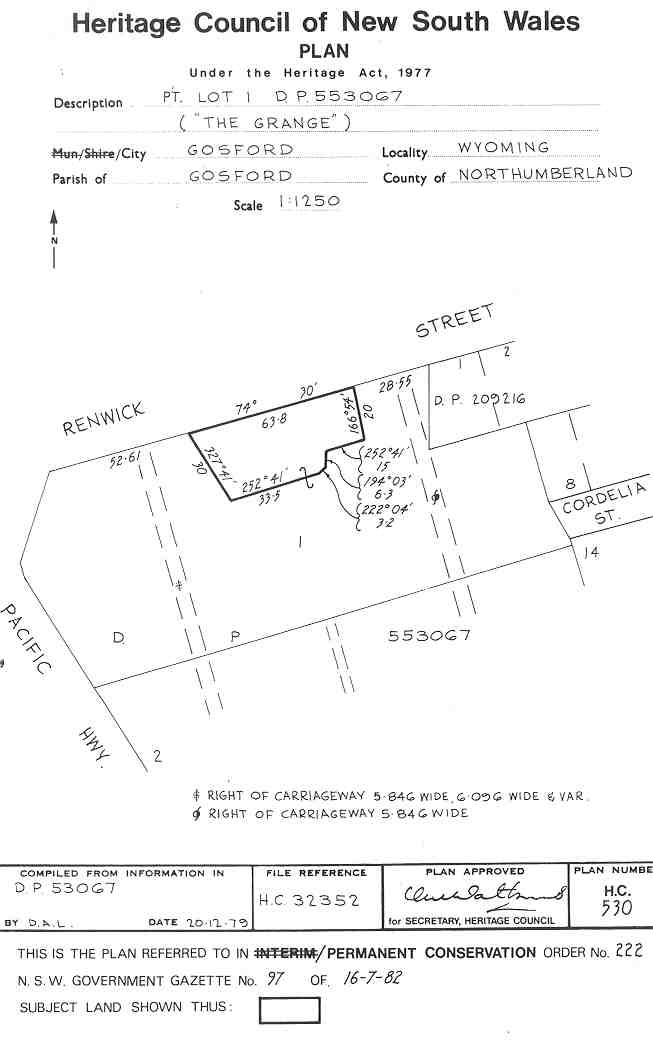
Heritage boundaries

The Grange was listed on the New South Wales State Heritage Register on 2 April 1999. It was also added to the former Register of the National Estate on 22 June 1993.
