= Narara railway station =

Railway station in New South Wales, Australia

Nararara
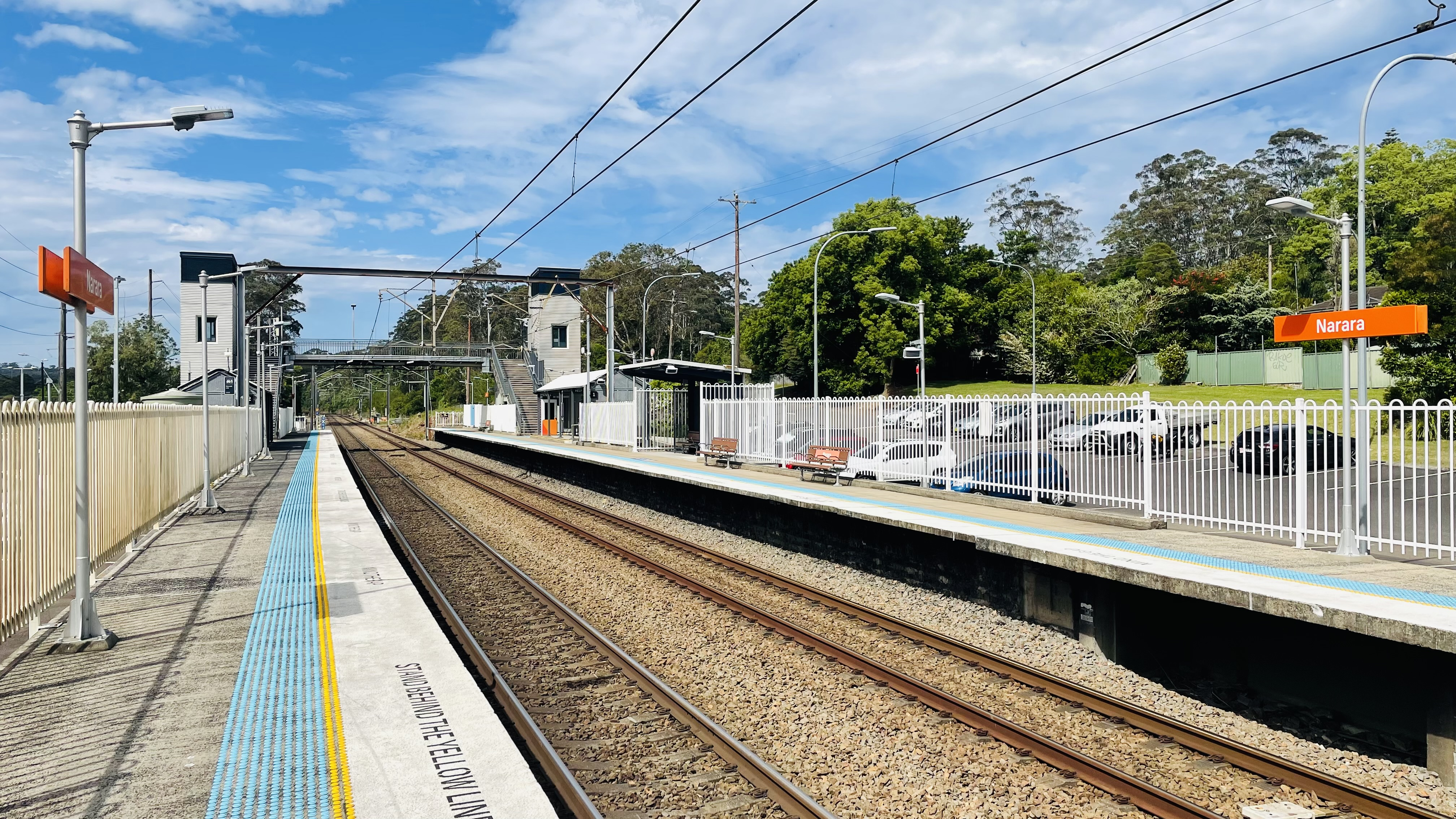
- Northbound view from Platform 2, November 2022

General information
- Location: Narara Valley Drive, Narara; Australia
- Coordinates: 33°23′41″S 151°20′39″E
- Elevation: 13 metres (43 ft)
- Owner: Transport Asset Manager of New South Wales
- Operator: Sydney Trains
- Line: Main Northern
- Distance: 84.60 km (52.57 mi) from Central
- Platforms: 2 side
- Tracks: 2
- Connections: Bus

Construction
- Structure type: Ground
- Accessible: Yes

Other information
- Station code: NRR
- Website: Transport for NSW

History
- Opened: 15 August 1887; 139 years ago

Passengers
- 2025: 106,871 (year); 293 (daily) (Sydney Trains, NSW TrainLink)

Services
Preceding station	Intercity Trains	Following station
Niagara Park towards Newcastle Interchange	Central Coast & Newcastle Line	Gosford towards Central
Location

Narara railway station is located on the Main Northern line in New South Wales, Australia. It serves the Central Coast suburb of Narara opening on 15 August 1887.

== Platforms and services ==
Narara has two side platforms. It is serviced by Sydney Trains Intercity Central Coast & Newcastle Line with services travelling between Sydney Central, Wyong & Newcastle via Strathfield, as well as limited services between Newcastle & Gosford. There are 3 weekday morning peak hour services from Wyong to Sydney Central via Gordon.

Platform	Line	Stopping pattern	Notes
1	Central Coast & Newcastle Line	Services to Gosford & Sydney Central via Strathfield	
1	Central Coast & Newcastle Line	3 Weekday morning peak hour services to Sydney Central via Gordon	
2	Central Coast & Newcastle Line	Services to Wyong & Newcastle	

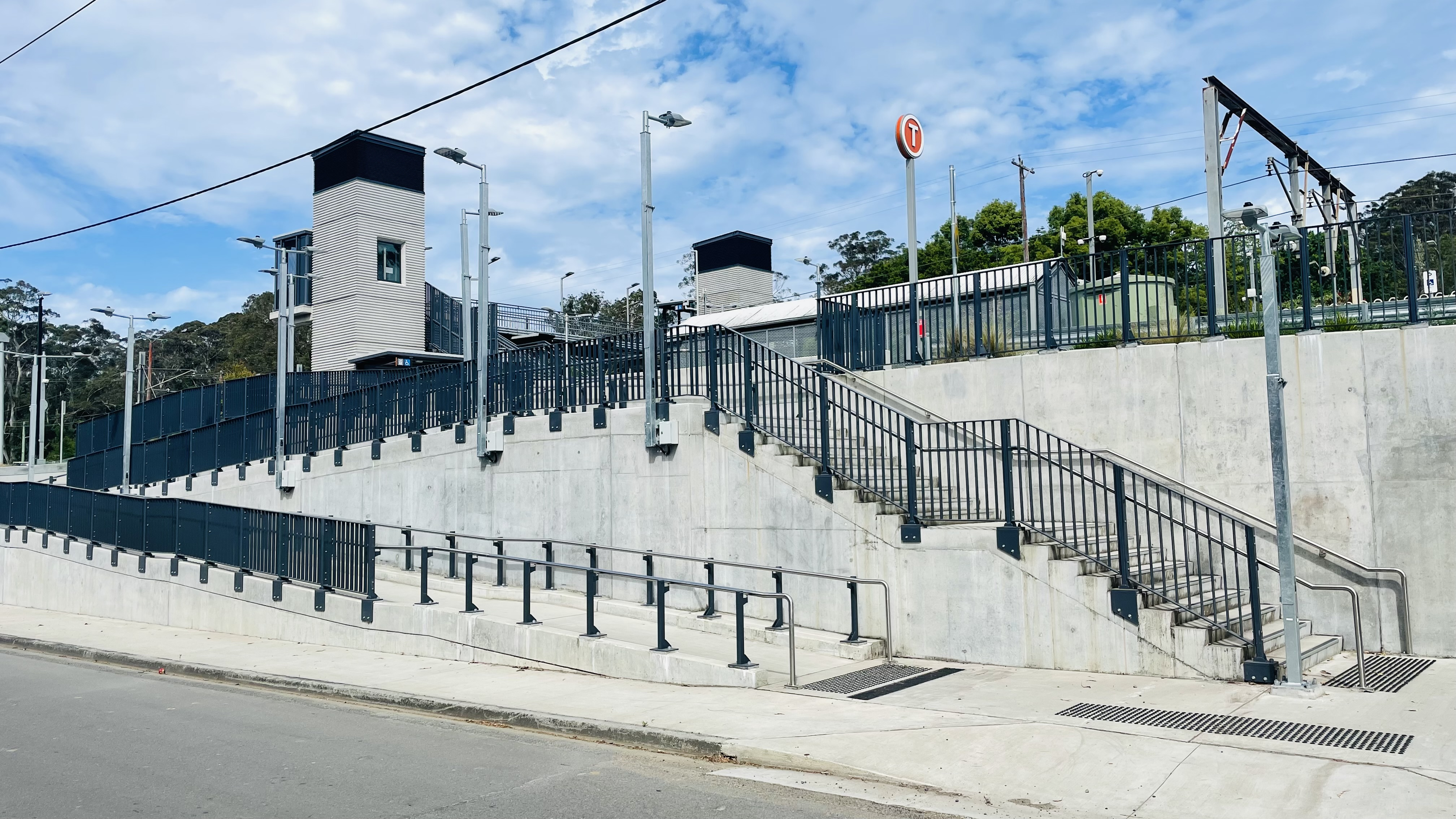
Entrance on Narara Valley Drive

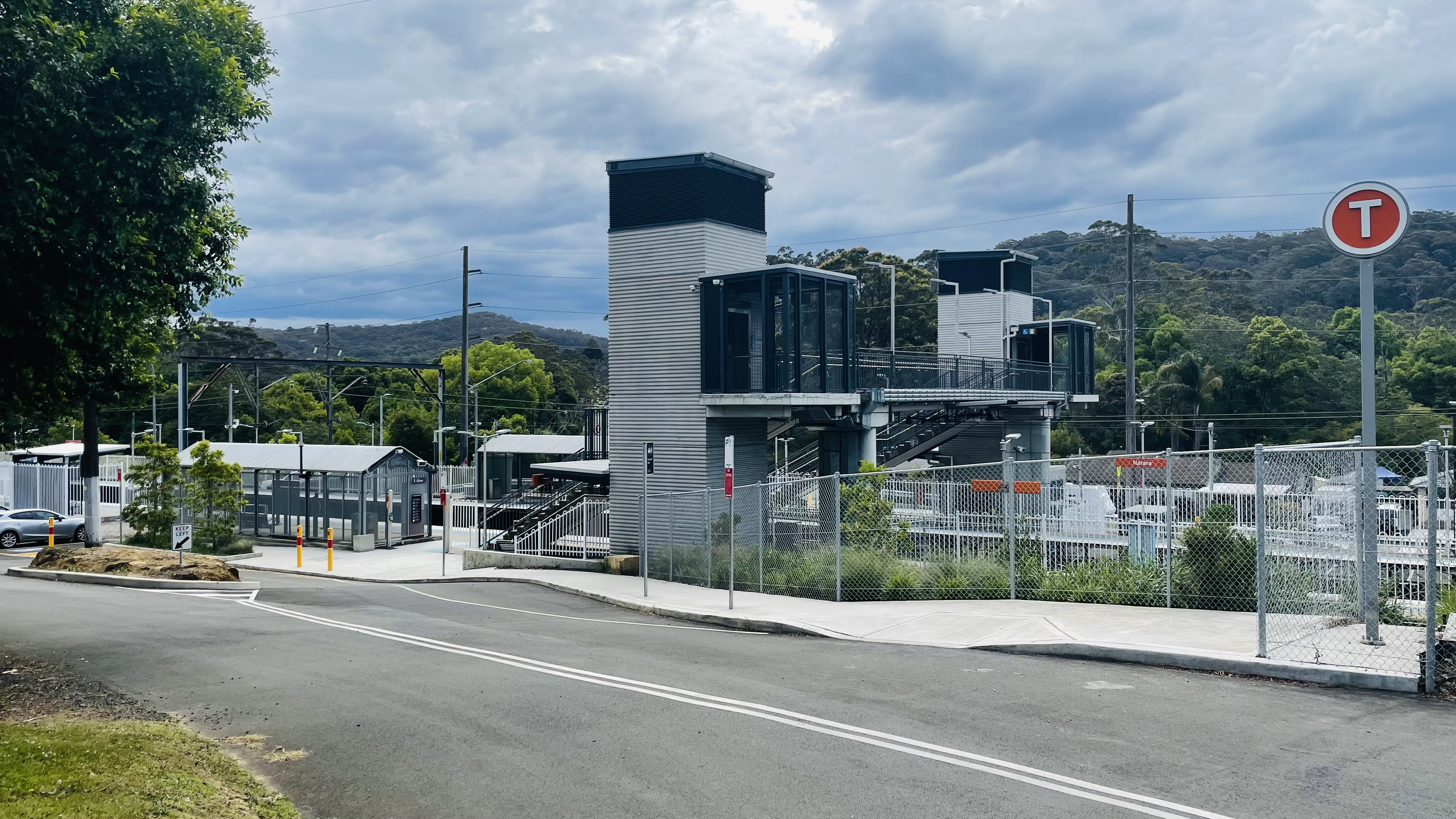
Entrance on Goonak Parade

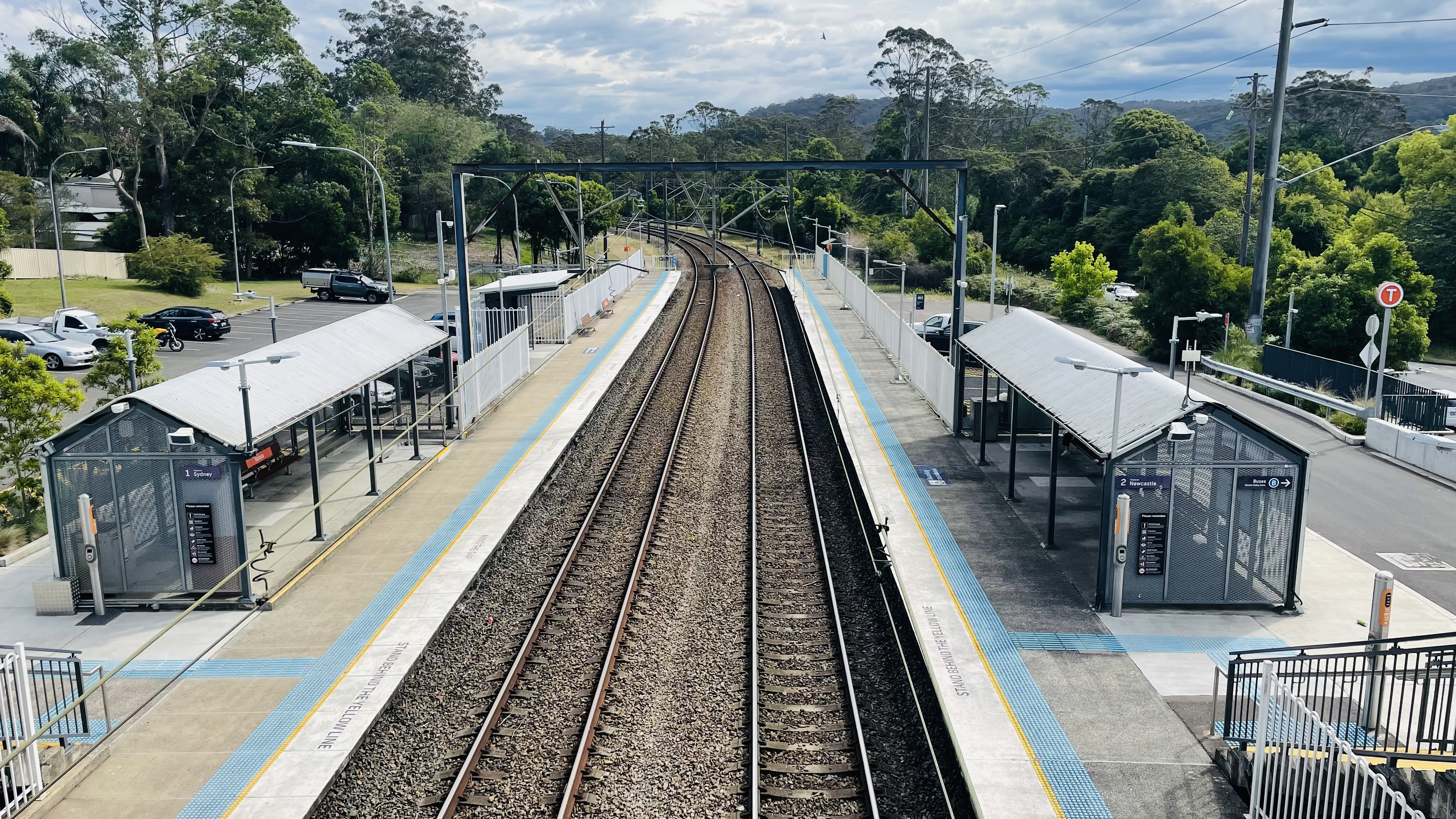
Southbound view from the footbridge

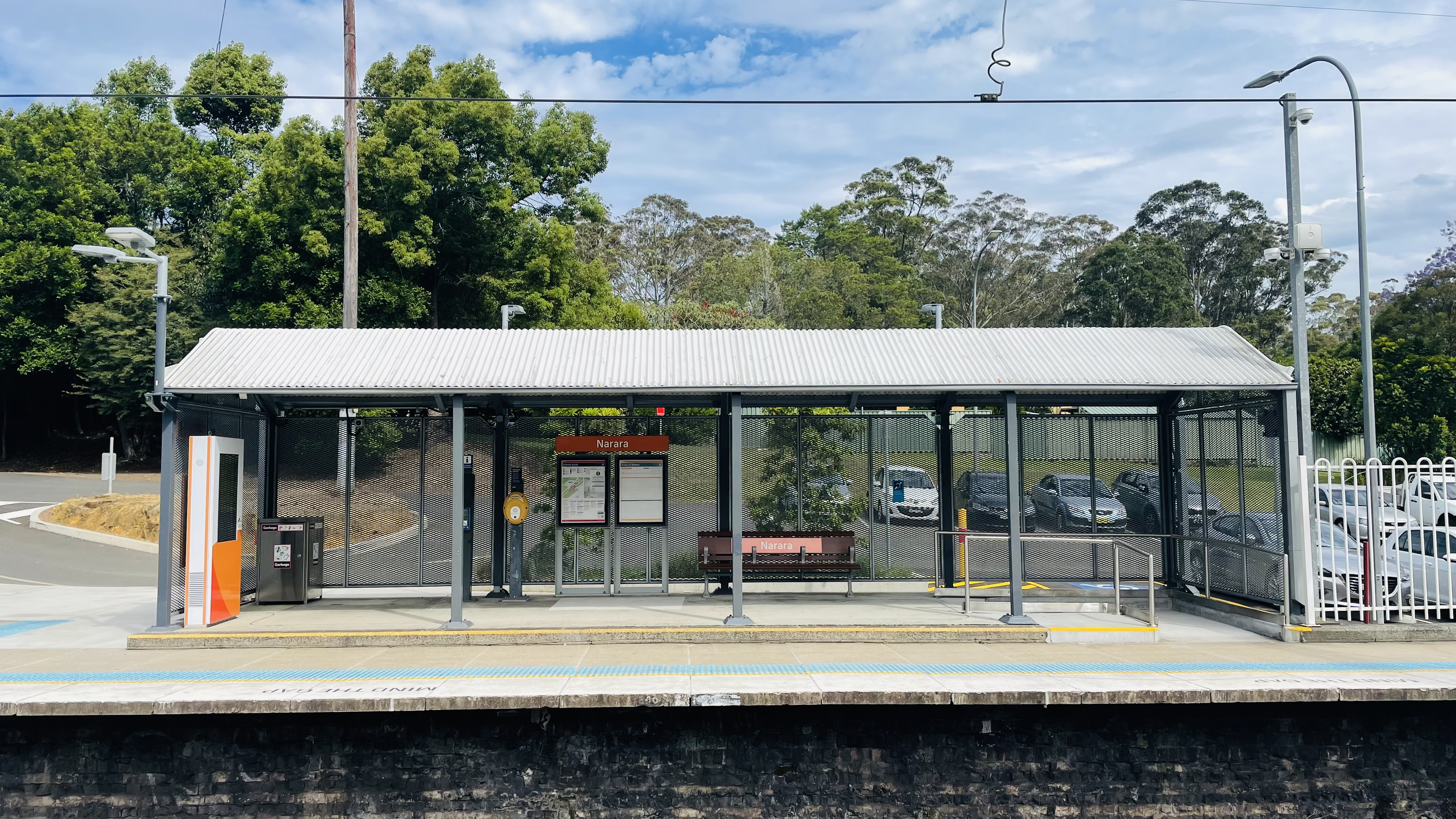
Station facilities on Platform 2

== Transport links ==
Busways operates two bus routes via Narara station, under contract to Transport for NSW:

- 36: Gosford station to Westfield Tuggerah via Narara
- 37: Gosford station to Westfield Tuggerah via Wyoming
