= Gertrude of Wyoming =

1809 poem by Thomas Campbell

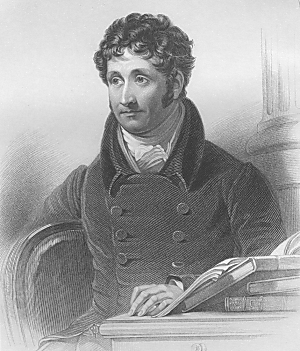
Thomas Campbell

Gertrude of Wyoming: A Pennsylvanian Tale (1809) is a romantic epic in Spenserian stanza composed by the Scottish poet Thomas Campbell (1777–1844). The poem was well received but not a financial success for its author and was written in the context of the Battle of Wyoming.

The poem begins:

On Susquehanna's side, fair Wyoming!
Although the wild-flower on thy ruin'd wall,
And roofless homes, a sad remembrance bring,
Of what thy gentle people did befall;
Yet thou wert once the loveliest land of all
That see the Atlantic wave their morn restore.
Sweet land! may I thy lost delights recall,
And paint thy Gertrude in her bowers of yore,
Whose beauty was the love of Pennsylvania's shore!
