= Narara, New South Wales =

Narara
- Suburb
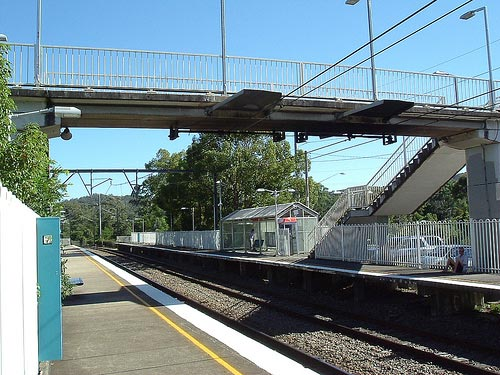
- Narara railway station

- Interactive map of Narara
- Coordinates: 33°23′53″S 151°21′4″E
- Country: Australia
- State: New South Wales
- City: Central Coast
- LGA: Central Coast Council
- Location: 4 km (2.5 mi) N of Gosford; 87 km (54 mi) S of Newcastle; 79 km (49 mi) N of Sydney; 23 km (14 mi) SW of The Entrance

Government
  - State electorates: The Entrance; Gosford
  - Federal divisions: Dobell; Robertson

Area
  - Total: 5.9 km^{2} (2.3 sq mi)
- Elevation: 9 m (30 ft)

Population
  - Total: 8,471 (2021 census)
  - Density: 1,436/km^{2} (3,720/sq mi)
- Postcode: 2250
- Parish: Gosford
Suburbs around Narara
Somersby	Niagara Park	Niagara Park
Somersby	Narara	Wyoming
West Gosford	Gosford	North Gosford

Narara (/nəˈrærə/) is a suburb just north of Gosford on the Central Coast region of New South Wales, Australia. It is part of the Central Coast Council local government area.

The suburb is mostly residential but also holds Narara railway station on the Central Coast & Newcastle Line. It also contains a number of parks, sporting grounds, and a concrete public skatepark. It is the home of Narara Valley High School, a NSW government high school, and St Philips Christian College Gosford, a private school educating children from kindergarten to year twelve.

It is also home to the Narara Ecovillage, which aims to research, design and build a stylish, intergenerational, friendly demonstration ecovillage, blending the principles of ecological and social sustainability, good health, business, caring and other options that can evolve from our well-being. Narara also hosts the annual Ecoburbia festival, awarded Best Community Event by Gosford City Council in 2015.

The name 'Narara' can be traced back to the local Aboriginal term for 'black snake', which appears on the official emblem of Narara Valley High School and the scarf of 1st Narara Scout Group.

The Narara Music Festival was held nearby in Somersby in 1983 and 1984. The Angels, an Australian rock band, produced a live album recorded at the festival, Live at Narara.

Narara largely consisted of orchards and small mixed farms. Water from the small dams that used to be accessible from Narara Creek Road was piped in wooden piping across Narara Creek to the railway station to supply steam trains. The dams were also a popular swimming spot especially when the ladder and walkway still existed on the lower dam wall.

Narara is home to the Central Coast Miniature Railway.
