= Empire Bay, New South Wales =

Empire Bay Central Coast, New South Wales
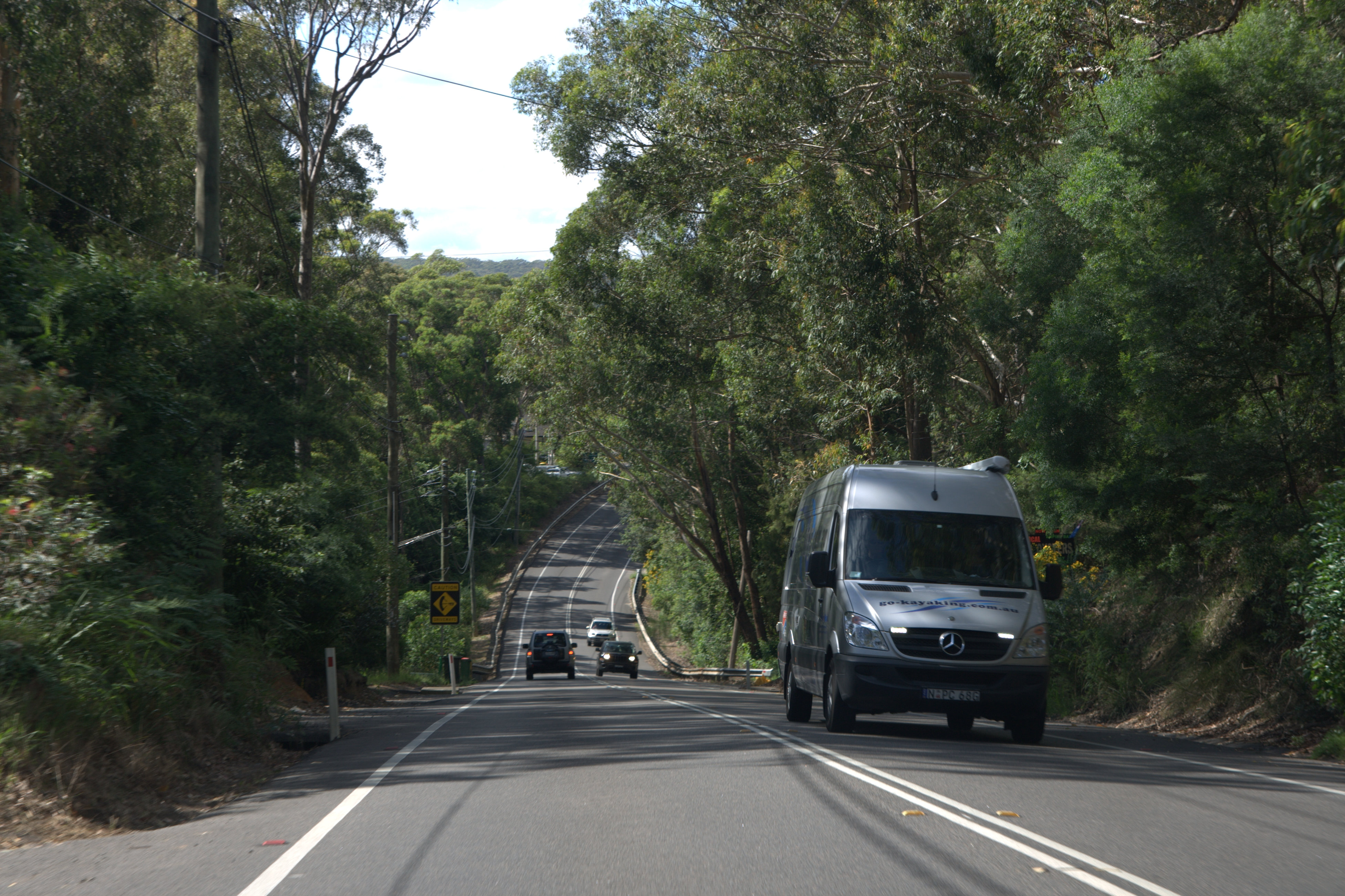

- Coordinates: 33°29′S 151°22′E
- Population: 2,274 (2011 census)
  - Density: 2,070/km^{2} (5,350/sq mi)
- Postcode(s): 2257
- Elevation: 3 m (10 ft)
- Area: 1.1 km^{2} (0.4 sq mi)
- Location: 8 km (5 mi) E of Woy Woy; 18 km (11 mi) S of Gosford; 95 km (59 mi) NNE of Sydney
- LGA(s): Central Coast Council
- Parish: Kincumber
- State electorate(s): Terrigal
- Federal division(s): Robertson
Suburbs around Empire Bay:
| Brisbane Water | Davistown | Kincumber |
| St Huberts Island | Empire Bay | Bensville |
| Daleys Point | Killcare Heights | Bensville |

Empire Bay is a suburb on the Central Coast of New South Wales, Australia. It is part of the Central Coast Council local government area.

Empire Bay was originally known as Sorrento being the name of a large boarding house in the locality. The land was subdivided in 1905. The name changed to Empire Bay in 1908 when a Postal Receiving Office was opened in a building attached to the boarding house. The name was changed because there was already a post office named Sorrento in Victoria and Empire Bay was chosen because there was no other such name in the Commonwealth. The name was officially changed on 24 May 1908. William Huggart who owned Sorrento House was the first postmaster. In 1909 the status of the office was changed to Post Office. It was moved into C. C. Swinburne's general store when he became Postmaster in 1910.

== Transport Links ==
Empire Bay is serviced by regular Busways bus services with connections to Woy Woy shopping centre and railway station, the Ettalong Beach retail centre, Kincumber and Erina Fair. The village is also serviced by Central Coast Ferries on the Woy Woy to Empire Bay route via Saratoga and Davistown.

== History ==
The original Empire Bay general store was built 1910 to 1912.
