= List of Central Coast, New South Wales suburbs =

This is a complete list of the towns, localities and suburbs located in the Central Coast region of New South Wales, Australia. Suburbs are listed here if they are in the Central Coast region and are listed on the Geographical Names Register as suburbs. The area is formed by the boundaries of Central Coast Council, which was a product of the merger of City of Gosford and Wyong Shire in 2016.

== A ==
- Alison
- Avoca Beach

== B ==
- Bar Point
- Bateau Bay
- Bensville
- Berkeley Vale
- Blackwall
- Blue Bay
- Blue Haven
- Booker Bay
- Bouddi
- Budgewoi
- Budgewoi Peninsula
- Buff Point
- Bushells Ridge

== C ==
- Calga
- Canton Beach
- Central Mangrove
- Chain Valley Bay
- Charmhaven
- Cheero Point
- Chittaway Bay
- Chittaway Point
- Cogra Bay
- Colongra
- Copacabana
- Crangan Bay (Southern and North-western part)

== D ==
- Daleys Point
- Davistown
- Dooralong
- Doyalson
- Doyalson North
- Durren Durren

== E ==
- East Gosford
- Empire Bay
- Erina
- Erina Heights
- Ettalong Beach

== F ==
- Forresters Beach
- Fountaindale
- Frazer Park

== G ==
- Glenning Valley
- Glenworth Valley
- Gorokan
- Gosford
- Green Point
- Greengrove
- Gunderman
- Gwandalan

== H ==
- Halekulani
- Halloran
- Hamlyn Terrace
- Hardys Bay
- Holgate
- Horsfield Bay

== J ==
- Jilliby

== K ==
- Kangy Angy
- Kanwal
- Kariong
- Kiar
- Killarney Vale
- Killcare
- Killcare Heights
- Kincumber
- Kincumber South
- Kingfisher Shores
- Koolewong
- Kulnura

== L ==
- Lake Haven
- Lake Munmorah
- Lemon Tree
- Lisarow
- Little Jilliby
- Little Wobby
- Long Jetty
- Lower Mangrove

== M ==
- MacMasters Beach
- Magenta
- Mangrove Creek
- Mangrove Mountain
- Mannering Park
- Mardi
- Marlow
- Matcham
- Moonee (Southern part)
- Mooney Mooney
- Mooney Mooney Creek
- Mount Elliot
- Mount White

== N ==
- Narara
- Niagara Park
- Norah Head
- Noraville
- North Avoca
- North Gosford

== O ==
- Ourimbah

== P ==
- Palm Grove
- Palmdale
- Patonga
- Pearl Beach
- Peats Ridge
- Phegans Bay
- Picketts Valley
- Point Clare
- Point Frederick
- Point Wolstoncroft
- Pretty Beach

== R ==
- Ravensdale
- Rocky Point

== S ==
- St Huberts Island
- San Remo
- Saratoga
- Shelly Beach
- Somersby
- Spencer
- Springfield
- Summerland Point

== T ==
- Tacoma
- Tacoma South
- Tascott
- Ten Mile Hollow (Eastern part)
- Terrigal
- The Entrance
- The Entrance North
- Toowoon Bay
- Toukley
- Tuggerah
- Tuggerawong
- Tumbi Umbi

== U ==
- Umina Beach
- Upper Mangrove

== W ==
- Wadalba
- Wagstaffe
- Wallarah
- Wamberal
- Warnervale
- Watanobbi
- Wendoree Park
- West Gosford
- Wisemans Ferry (North-eastern part)
- Wondabyne
- Woongarrah
- Woy Woy
- Woy Woy Bay
- Wybung
- Wyoming
- Wyong
- Wyong Creek
- Wyongah

== Y ==
- Yarramalong
- Yattalunga
