= Central Coast Ferries =

- Industry: Shipping
- Founded: 1991
- Headquarters: Empire Bay, Australia
- Area served: Brisbane Water
- Services: Ferry operator
- Parent: Conway family
- Website: www.centralcoastferries.com.au

Central Coast Ferries is an Australian ferry operator on the Central Coast of New South Wales.

== History ==
Central Coast Ferries was established in 1991 by the Conway family as a ferry operator on Brisbane Water.

== Services ==
Central Coast Ferries operates a service from Woy Woy to Empire Bay via Saratoga and Davistown under contract to Transport for New South Wales. It previously ran a service from Woy Woy to Ettalong Beach that commenced in 2006. In May 2016, a monthly service was introduced from Gosford to Patonga.

== Fleet ==
As at March 2018, Central Coast Ferries operated three vessels:

- MV Codock II (built 1945), purchased 2006, built for Royal Australian Navy, purchased by Cockatoo Docks & Engineering Company, Sydney 1947
- MV Saratoga (built 2003)
- MV Sorrento (built 2003), purchased from Belmont Christian College, Lake Macquarie 2015
