= Jack Hazlitt =

Australian soldier

- Hazlitt in 1992
- Born: Cecil John Hazlitt; 15 June – 31 December 1897; Melbourne, Victoria, Australia
- Died: June 15, 1993 (aged 95); New South Wales, Australia
- Military career
- Allegiance: Commonwealth of Australia
- Branch: Australian Army
- Service years: 1915–1916
- Rank: Private
- Nickname: Jack
- Unit: 28th Battalion

Cecil John "Jack" Hazlitt (1897–1993) was an Australian soldier who fought in World War I.

== Early life ==
Hazlitt was born between 15 June and 31 December 1897 in Melbourne, Victoria, Australia.

== Career ==
Hazlitt enlisted to join Australian forces on 27 February 1915, and embarked from Fremantle on 9 June 1915. He arrived at Gallipoli in July of that year, and fought in the Gallipoli Campaign as a runner. The average runner at Gallipoli survived for 24 hours, but Hazlitt survived for five months. He later fought in the Battles of Pozières and the Somme, before leaving to return to Australia on 26 December 1916.

== Death ==
Hazlitt died on 15 June 1993 in New South Wales, Australia, aged 95, while living in MacMasters Beach.
