= Avoca Beach =

- Suburb
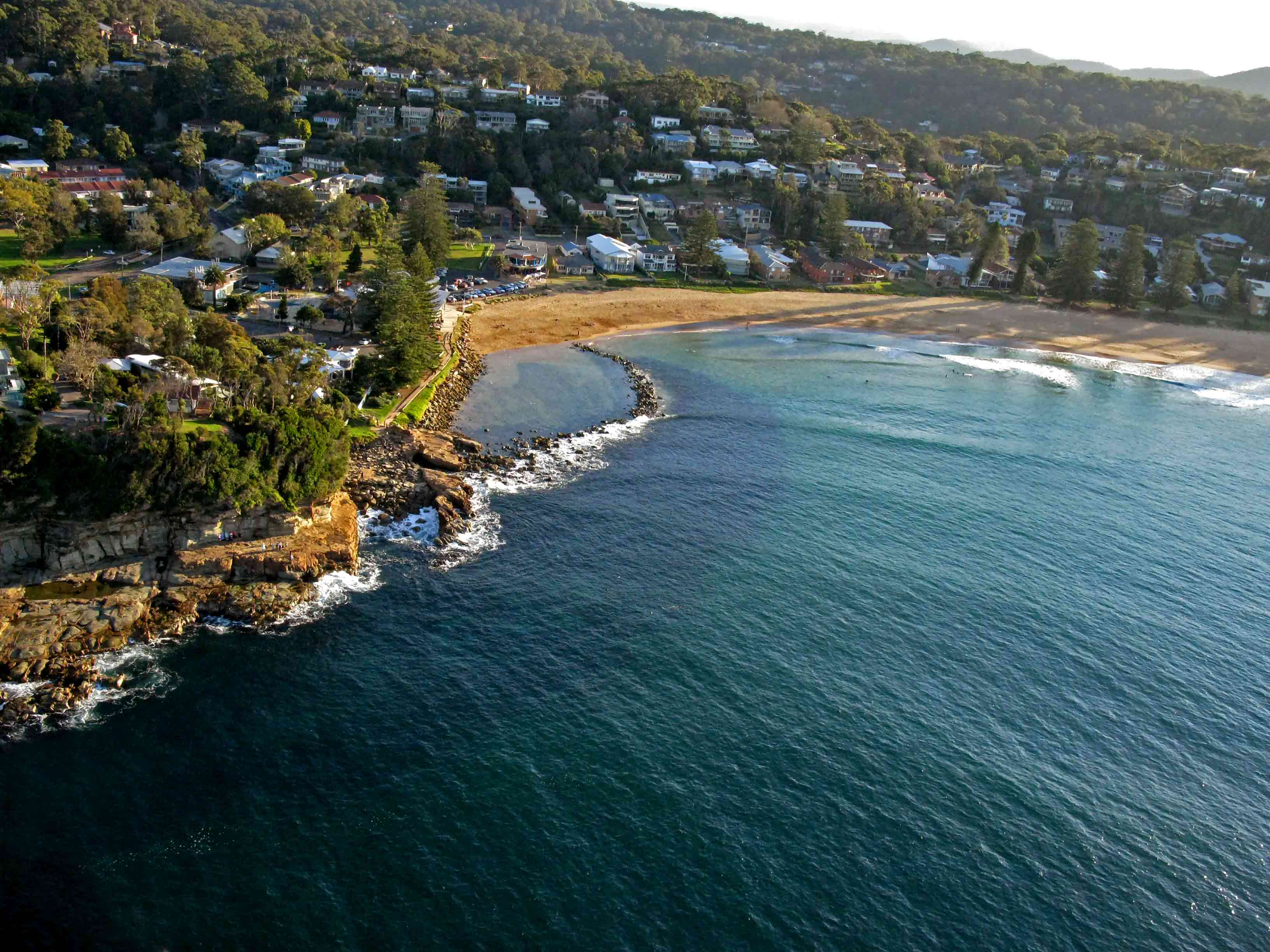
- The view of Avoca Beach and the rockpool

- Interactive map of Avoca Beach
- Coordinates: 33°27′54″S 151°26′06″E
- Country: Australia
- State: New South Wales
- City: Central Coast
- LGA: Central Coast Council
- Location: 92 km (57 mi) NNE of Sydney; 17 km (11 mi) ESE of Gosford; 8 km (5.0 mi) S of Terrigal; 22 km (14 mi) SSW of The Entrance

Government
  - State electorate: Terrigal
  - Federal division: Robertson

Area
  - Total: 4.0 km^{2} (1.5 sq mi)
- Elevation: 8 m (26 ft)

Population
  - Total: 4,708 (2021 census)
  - Density: 1,177/km^{2} (3,050/sq mi)
- Postcode: 2251
- Parish: Kincumber
Suburbs around Avoca Beach
Picketts Valley	Terrigal	North Avoca
Kincumber	Avoca Beach	Tasman Sea
Kincumber	Kincumber	Copacabana

Avoca Beach (/əˈvoʊkə/) is a coastal suburb of the Central Coast region of New South Wales, Australia, about 95 kilometres (59 mi) north of Sydney. Avoca Beach is primarily a residential suburb, but also a popular tourist destination. It is known for its surfing and state (regional) surf competitions. It is located within the Central Coast Council local government area.

Avoca Beach village has a variety of restaurants and cafes as well as a post office, newsagent, pharmacy and mini-mart. Avoca Beach also has a historic cinema, a hotel, bowling club, motel and caravan park.

== Geography ==
Avoca Beach is located on the Tasman Sea 17 kilometres (11 mi) east-southeast of the Gosford central business district, and about halfway between Newcastle and Sydney, being about 95 kilometres (59 mi) from each. It is bordered to the north by the Bulbararing Lagoon, to the west by Saltwater Creek and to the east by the ocean.

== History ==
The area was originally inhabited by the Darkinjung & Awabakal Aboriginal people. "Avoca" is an Irish name meaning "great estuary" or "where the river meets the sea", and is also the name of a town in County Wicklow, Ireland.

On 4 January 1830, 640 acres (259 ha) of land in the area were promised to Irish army officer John Moore. However, the official deeds were not issued until 30 September 1839, due to the difficulty in surveying the land. He built a house opposite Bulbararing Lake (now known as Avoca Lake) and planted vines, cereals and fruit trees. He left the area in 1857 for the Victorian goldfields. In the late 19th century, Tom Davis leased the area in order to exploit local timber, which was transported by tram to a mill at Terrigal via what is now Tramway Road in North Avoca.

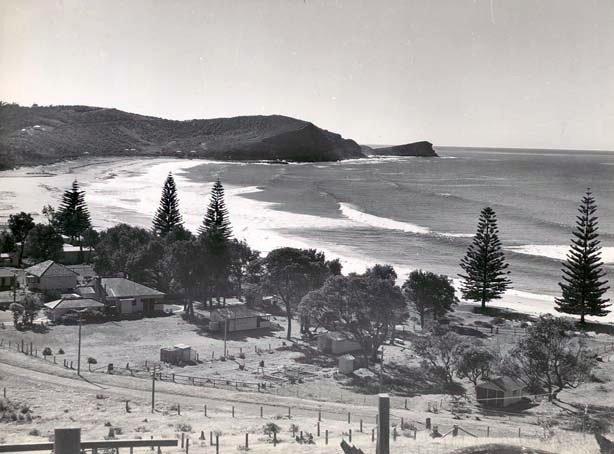
Avoca Beach in the 1950s

In the 1950s, commercial buildings began to be built and populated, including bakery, service station, butchery, mini mart, caravan park and the Avoca Beach Theatre.

Residential development in Avoca Beach began during the 20th century, and the area subsequently became a popular holiday retreat with wealthy residents of Sydney's North Shore.

In February 2010, following the proposal to scuttle the frigate HMAS Adelaide off the beach as a dive wreck in late March, a resident action group was formed to protest against this. The group claims that the wreck will negatively affect surf conditions, tides, and littoral sand drift, and is concerned over the thoroughness of inspection and removal of dangerous materials and chemicals from the former warship, with the chance that marine life and people could be poisoned. An appeal to the Administrative Appeals Tribunal three days before the planned scuttling date of 27 March led to a postponement of the plan until the residents' claims were investigated. The decision from the Tribunal, in favor of the project going ahead after further cleanup work, was handed down on 15 September 2010, and despite further attempts to delay, Adelaide was scuttled on 13 April 2011.

== Demographics ==
At the ABS 2021 census, Avoca Beach had a population of 4,708 people. 76.9% of people were born in Australia. The next most common country of birth was England at 8.2%. 92.1% of people only spoke English at home. The most common responses for religion in Avoca Beach were No Religion 46.6%, Catholic 19.3% and Anglican 14.4%.

Avoca Beach residents had a median age of 43, the same as the Central Coast local government area. Median individual incomes in Avoca Beach were above average for the region — $927 per week compared with $727 per week. The 2021 Census reported 1,539 occupied private dwellings, of which 86.7% were separate houses, and the median monthly housing loan repayment of $2,508 was well above the regional average of $2,000.

In 2020, Avoca Beach's median house price was $1,150,000 versus $940,000 for the Central Coast region.

== Education ==
Avoca Beach has a state primary school, which first opened in 1935. The suburb is within Kincumber High School's catchment area.

== Politics ==
At federal level, Avoca Beach is within the Division of Robertson. In the Federal election of May 2022 it was won by Gordon Reid of the Australian Labor Party, previously held for nine years by Lucy Wicks of the Liberal Party of Australia.

In the New South Wales Legislative Assembly, Avoca Beach is within the electorate of Terrigal, currently held by Adam Crouch of the Liberal Party.

Polling place statistics are presented below from the Avoca Beach polling place in the elections leading up to and including the 2019 federal and state elections as indicated.

2019 federal election Source: AEC
Liberal	43.7%
Labor	32.7%
Greens	14.2%
Independent	3.7%
AJP	1.8%

2016 federal election Source: AEC
Liberal	49.1%
Labor	33.1%
Greens	2.55%
CDP	11.3%
Independent	2.2%

2013 federal election Source: AEC
Liberal	43.6%
Labor	33.2%
Greens	7.3%
Independent	9.2%
Independent	2.5%

2010 federal election Source: AEC
Liberal	41.7%
Labor	37.6%
Greens	11.7%
Independent	2.9%
CDP	2.3%

2007 federal election Source: AEC
Liberal	46.1%
Labor	40.2%
Greens	10.5%
CDP	2.09%
Family First	0.57%

2004 federal election Source: AEC
Liberal	53.7%
Labor	32.3%
Greens	11.0%
Family First	1.54%
One Nation	0.92%

2001 federal election Source: AEC
Liberal	51.2%
Labor	30.4%
Greens	6.14%
Democrats	3.91%
Independent	3.36%

2019 state election Source: ECNSW
Liberal	48.2%
Labor	24.6%
Greens	12.9%
Independent	3.9%
SAP	3.1%

2015 state election Source: ECNSW
Liberal	47.1%
Labor	30.0%
Greens	15.4%
CDP	2.7%
NLT	1.0%

2011 state election Source: ECNSW
Liberal	61.0%
Labor	17.8%
Greens	13.5%
Independent	3.2%
CDP	2.9%

2007 state election Source: ECNSW
Liberal	47.6%
Labor	33.3%
Greens	12.0%
CDP	3.05%
AAFI	1.63%

2003 state election Source: ECNSW
Labor	46.8%
Liberal	40.0%
Greens	10.8%
Democrats	1.06%
SOS	1.01%

1999 state election Source: ECNSW
Labor	42.5%
Liberal	40.4%
One Nation	3,76%
Democrats	3.60%
Greens	3.43%

== Gallery ==
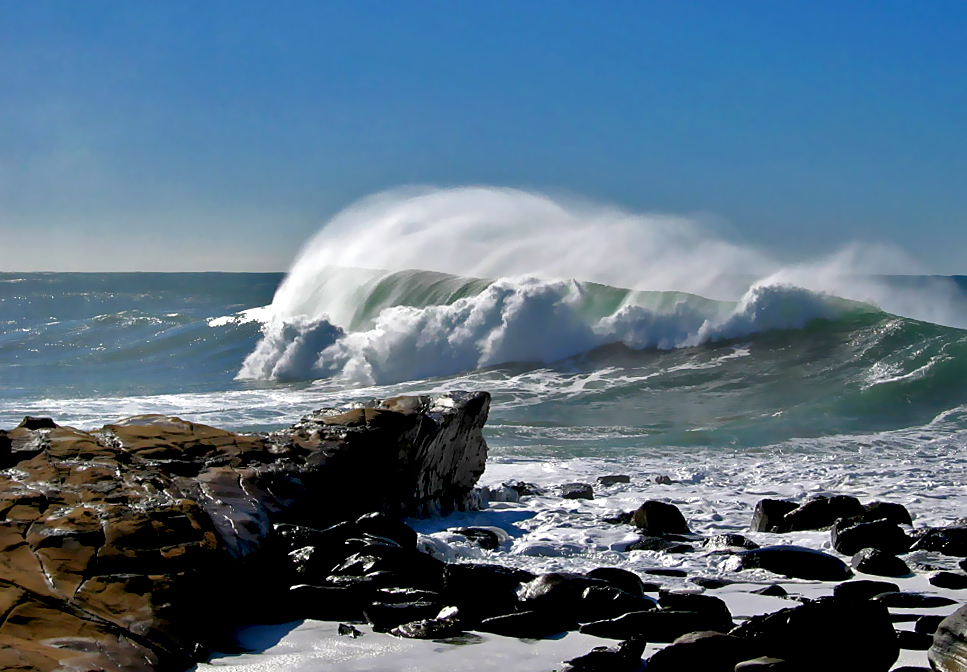
Avoca Headland big surf

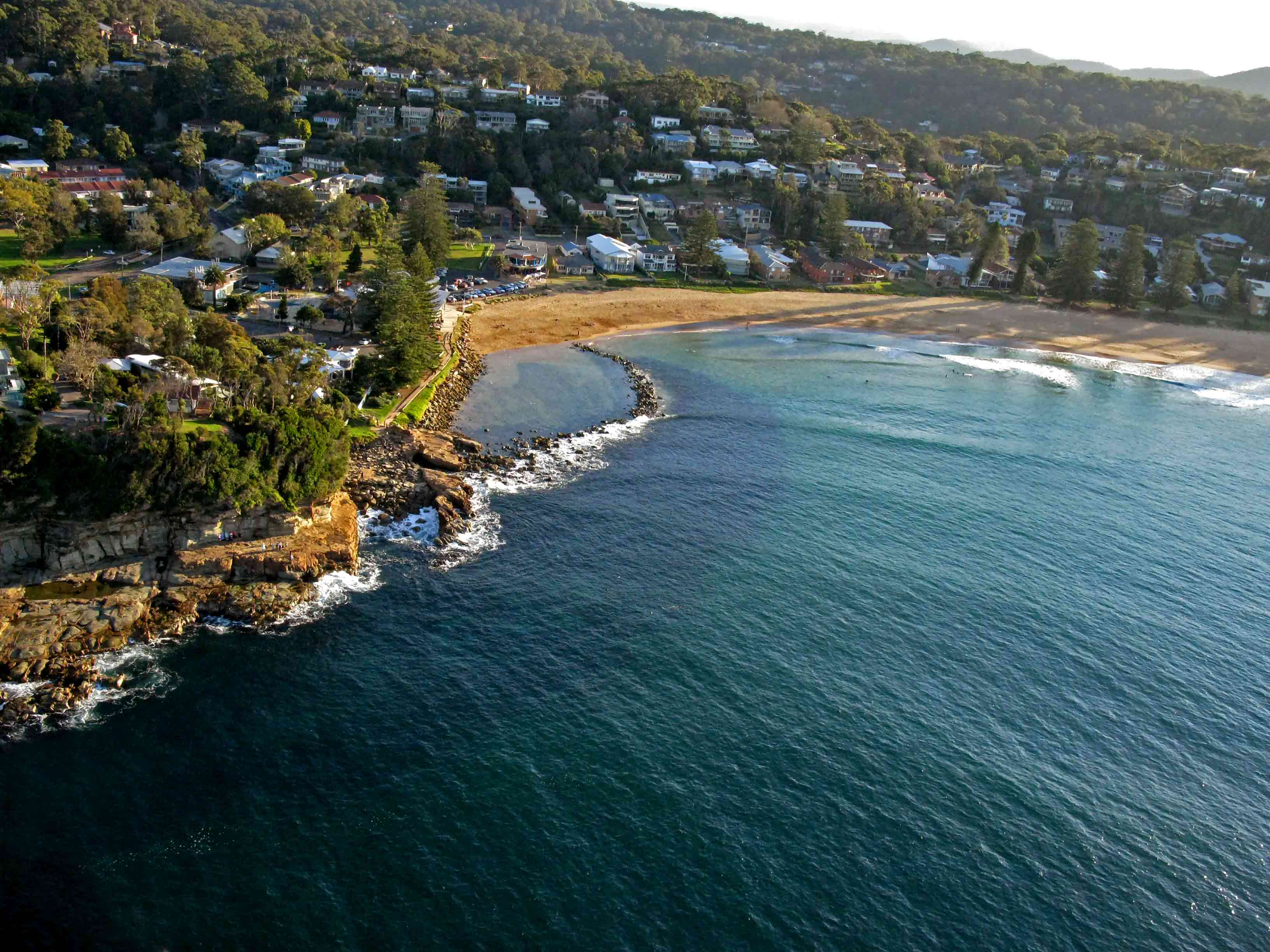
Avoca from the air

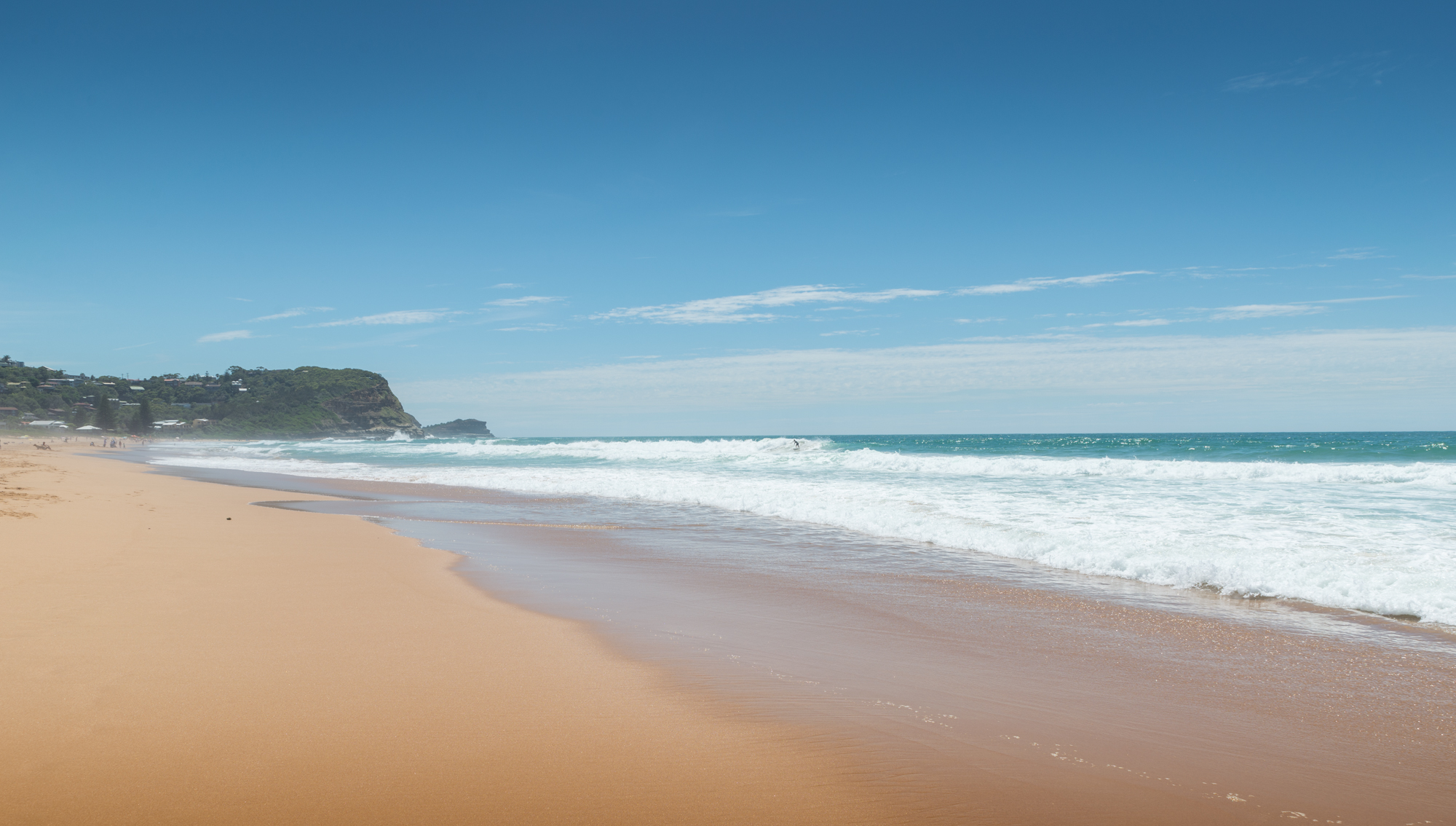
Avoca Beach, facing north near the lagoon

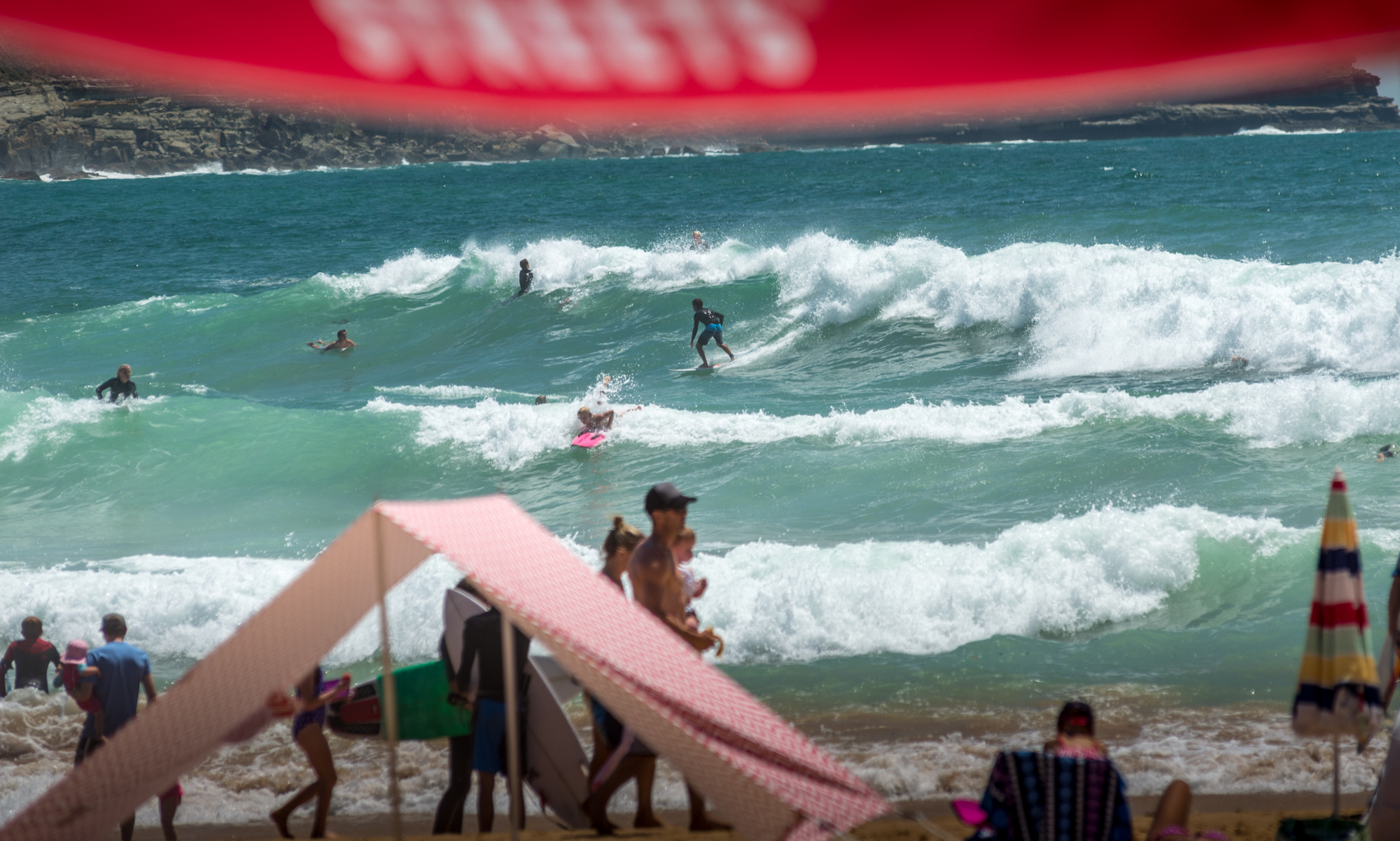
Surfers and beachgoers on a busy summer day

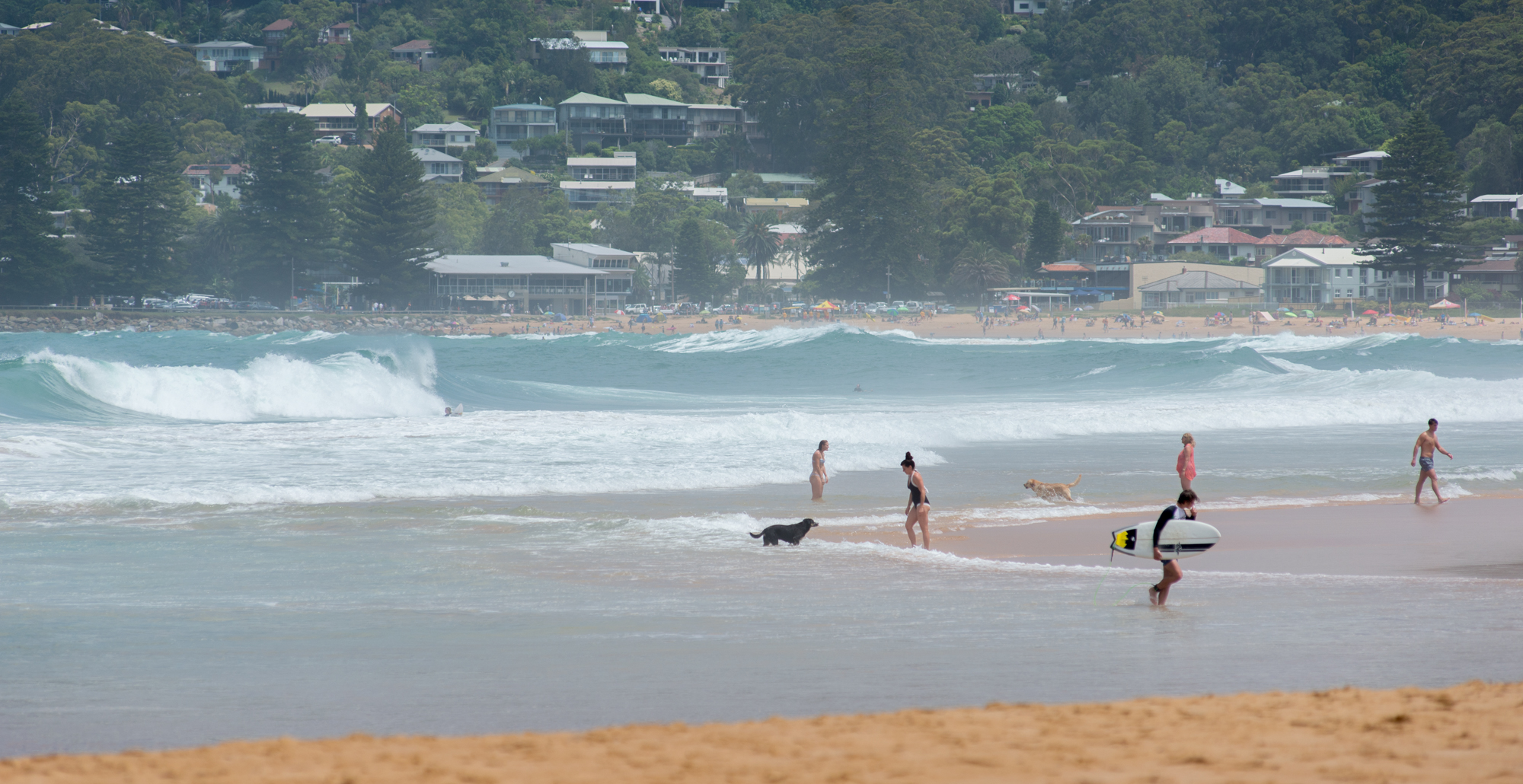
Avoca Beach, New South Wales- facing south towards surf club
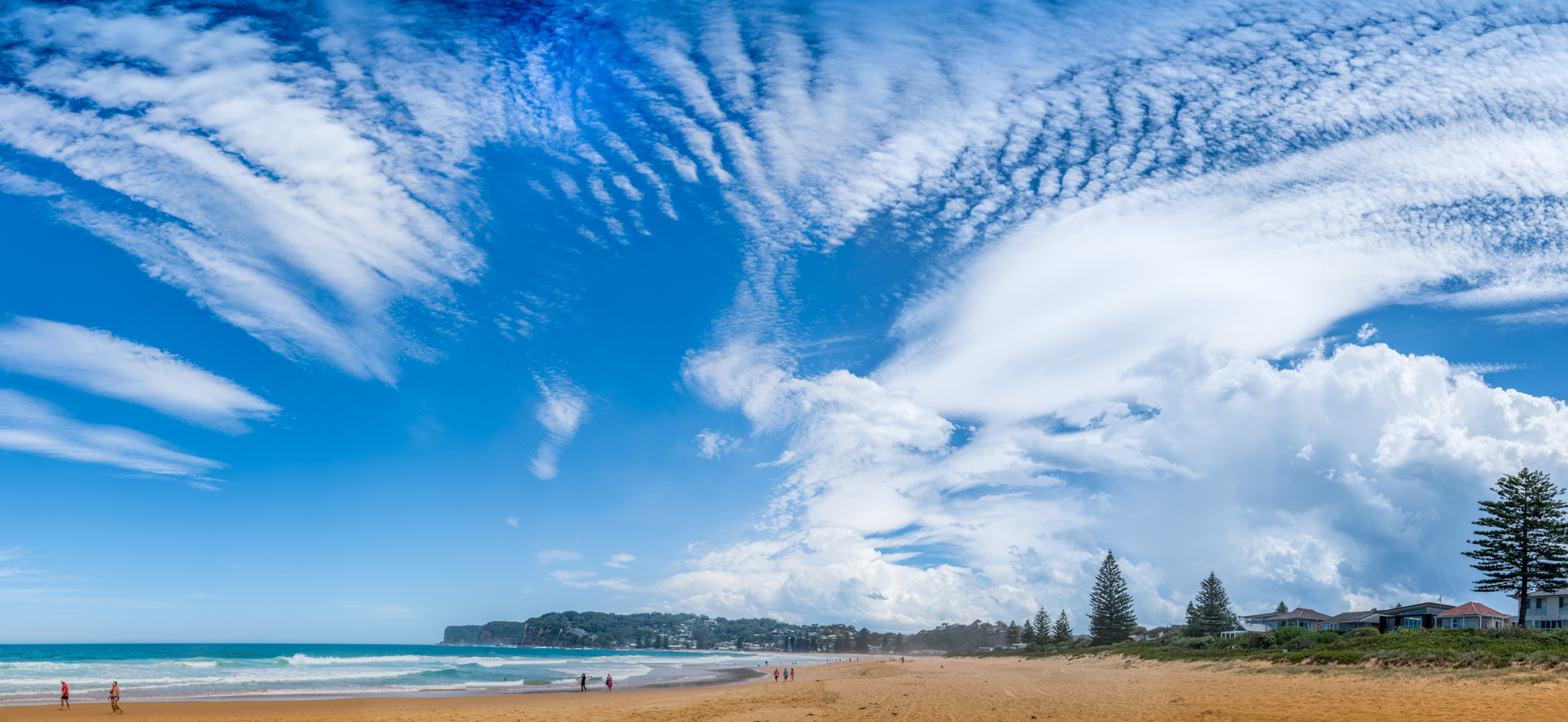
A panoramic view of Avoca facing south, with a storm building, 2014
