= Bouddi =

Bouddi may refer to:

- Bouddi, New South Wales, a suburb of the Central Coast of New South Wales
- Bouddi National Park, located on the Central Coast of New South Wales
