= Eddie White (rugby league) =

Australian rugby league footballer

Personal information
- Full name: Edward Charles White
- Born: 8 May 1883 Paddington, New South Wales, Australia
- Died: 4 March 1962 (aged 78) Saratoga, New South Wales, Australia

Playing information
- Position: Wing, Centre
Club
Years	Team	Pld	T	G	FG	P
1910–14	Eastern Suburbs	35	9	0	0	27
Representative
Years	Team	Pld	T	G	FG	P
1912	New South Wales	1	4	0	0	12
1912	Metropolis	1	0	0	0	0
- Military career
- Allegiance: Australia
- Branch: Australian Army
- Service years: 1900-1902; 1916-1919; 1940-1943
- Unit: First Australian Imperial Force
- Conflicts: Second Boer War; World War I; World War II
- Relatives: Percy White (brother)

Edward Charles White (1883–1962) was an Australian rugby league footballer in formative years of the New South Wales Rugby Football League premiership and an Australian Imperial Forces officer who saw active service in the Boer War and the Great War.

== Rugby league career ==
Born in Paddington on 8 May 1883, Eddie White was a wing with Eastern Suburbs. White played thirty-five matches for the Eastern Suburbs club in the years (1911–13). White was a member of Eastern Suburbs first premiership winning team of 1911 who beat Glebe in a premiership decider. He was a squad member of the sides that took out the RAS shield winning the 1912 and 1913 competitions on a points basis at the end of those regular seasons. Eddie was the Eastern Suburbs club's 53rd player and the older brother of teammate Percy White. His father John White was an early president of the Eastern Suburbs club.

White was a New South Wales state representative in rugby league. In his only appearance he scored two tries in a 1912 interstate match against Queensland.

== War service ==
White was already a veteran of the Boer War, when he enlisted for the First World War at age 32 in 1916. He was enlisted as a 2nd lieutenant with the 1st Division Engineers of the AIF. On 31 October 1917 he embarked from Sydney on board HMAT A14 Euripedes with the July 1917 reinforcements. He survived the war and was a lieutenant at the time of his demobilisation in 1919. He rose to rank of captain in the World War II, at HQ Eastern Command Engineers Serve Branch. He was discharged in 1943.

== Death ==
A builder and architect during his working life, Eddie White died at Saratoga, New South Wales on 4 March 1962, age 78. His Death Notice listed him as being a veteran of the Boer War and 1st & 2nd A.I.F. He was cremated at Woronora Cematorium, Sutherland, on 7 March 1962.
