= Davistown =

- Suburb
- Central Wharf, Davistown

- Coordinates: 33°28′55″S 151°21′36″E
- Country: Australia
- State: New South Wales
- City: Central Coast
- LGA: Central Coast Council
- Location: 12 km (7.5 mi) S of Gosford; 13 km (8.1 mi) WSW of Terrigal

Government
  - State electorate: Terrigal
  - Federal division: Robertson

Area
  - Total: 1.6 km^{2} (0.62 sq mi)

Population
  - Total: 2,602 (2021 census)
  - Density: 1,630/km^{2} (4,210/sq mi)
- Postcode: 2251
- Parish: Kincumber
Suburbs around Davistown
Saratoga	Saratoga	Kincumber
Woy Woy	Davistown	Kincumber South
St Huberts Island	Empire Bay	Bensville

Davistown is a south-eastern suburb of the Central Coast region of New South Wales, Australia. It is part of the Central Coast Council local government area.

The suburb is serviced by a small shopping centre, Paringa Mall, and the Davistown RSL.

It is populated mostly by young families and elderly retirees.

In recent years, much of the dilapidated housing in the area, built mostly within the 1950s through to the 1980s has undergone purchasing by wealthier individuals who are rebuilding new homes.

== Population ==
At the 2021 Census, the population of Davistown was 2,602. 84% of people were born in Australia. The next most common country of birth was England at 4.9%. 94.1% of people only spoke English at home. The most common responses for religion in Davistown were No Religion 38.3%, Anglican 21.2% and Catholic 20.9%.
