= Killcare Heights =

Coordinates: 33°31′55″S 151°22′05″E

- Suburb
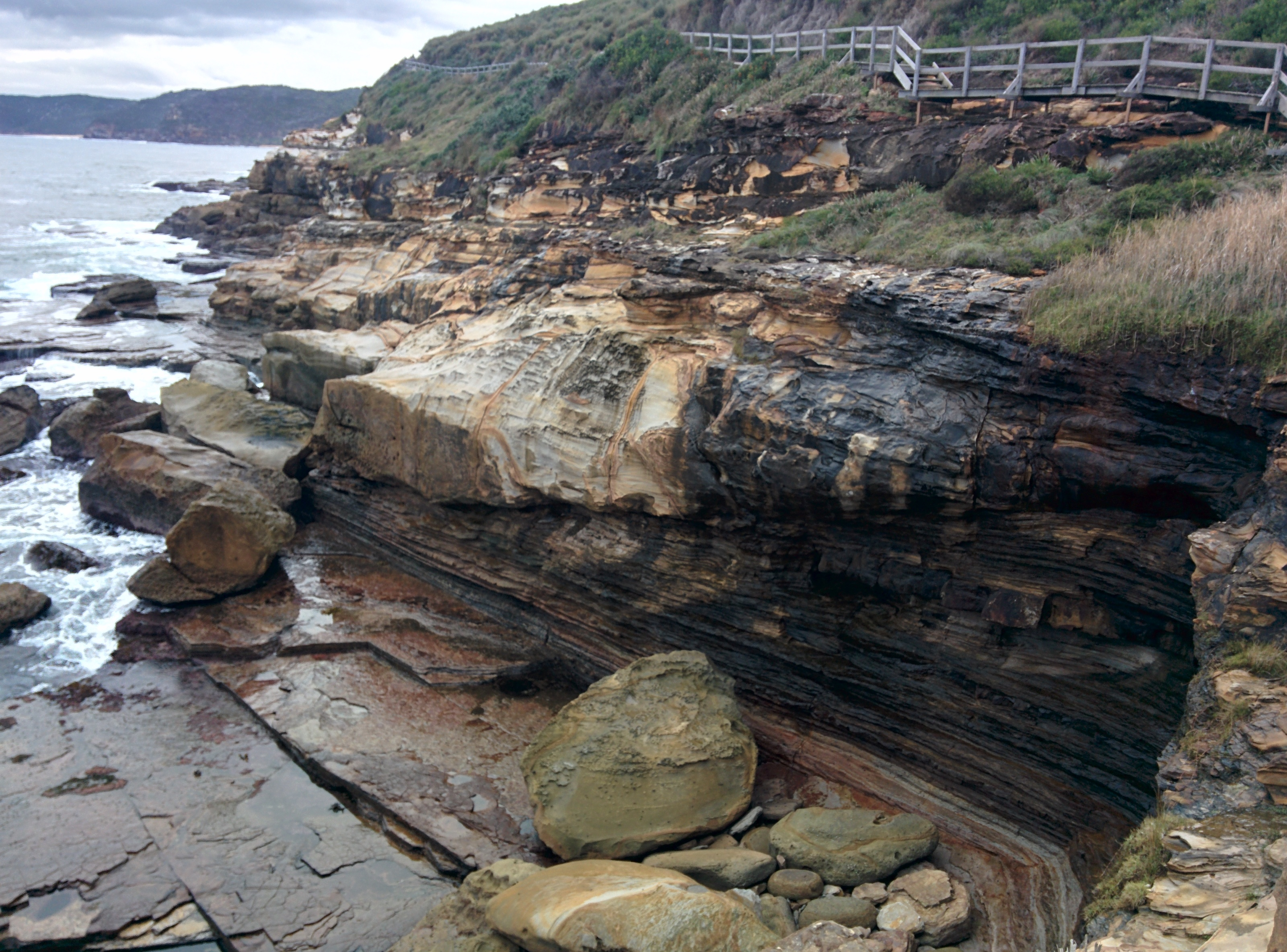
- The Coast Walk in Bouddi National Park
- Interactive map of Killcare Heights
- Country: Australia
- State: New South Wales
- City: Central Coast
- LGA: Central Coast Council
- Location: 21 km (13 mi) S of Gosford; 12 km (7.5 mi) SE of Woy Woy; 93 km (58 mi) NNE of Sydney

Government
  - State electorate: Terrigal
  - Federal division: Robertson

Area
  - Total: 0.9 km^{2} (0.35 sq mi)
- Elevation: 130 m (430 ft)

Population
  - Total: 745 (2016 census)
  - Density: 830/km^{2} (2,140/sq mi)
- Postcode: 2257
- Parish: Kincumber
Suburbs around Killcare Heights
Daleys Point	Bensville	Bouddi
Killcare	Killcare Heights	Bouddi
Killcare	Tasman Sea	Tasman Sea

Killcare Heights is a south-eastern suburb and village located on the Bouddi Peninsula of the Central Coast region of New South Wales, Australia. It is part of the Central Coast Council local government area.

== Demographics ==
95.3% of the population only speak English at home, with the most common languages spoken other than English being Mandarin, German and French. The median age of Killcare Heights is 47, significantly above the median age of NSW and Australia, which is 38.

41.4% of the population described themselves as without a religion; 21.1% described themselves as Catholic, and 17.1% as Anglican. Other residents have described themselves as members of the Uniting Church in Australia, Presbyterian church or Pentecostal church.

Country of Birth (2016)
Birthplace (Note: In accordance with the Australian Bureau of Statistics source, England, Scotland, Mainland China and the Special Administrative Regions of Hong Kong and Macau are listed separately)	Population	Percentage of Population
Australia	594	79.7%
England	58	7.8%
New Zealand	13	1.7%
Germany	11	1.5%

== See also ==
- Bouddi National Park
