= Yattalunga =

Yattalunga may refer to:

- Yattalunga, New South Wales in the Central Coast region north of Sydney
- Yattalunga, South Australia in the City of Playford in the outer northeast of Adelaide
