= Yattalunga, New South Wales =

Yattalunga
- Suburb
- Interactive map of Yattalunga
- Coordinates: 33°28′05″S 151°21′59″E
- Country: Australia
- State: New South Wales
- City: Central Coast
- LGA: Central Coast Council
- Location: 9 km (5.6 mi) SSE of Gosford; 10 km (6.2 mi) WSW of Terrigal

Government
  - State electorate: Terrigal
  - Federal division: Robertson

Area
  - Total: 1.1 km^{2} (0.42 sq mi)

Population
  - Total: 580 (2021 census)
  - Density: 527/km^{2} (1,370/sq mi)
- Postcode: 2251
- Parish: Kincumber
Suburbs around Yattalunga
	Green Point
Brisbane Water	Yattalunga	Kincumber
Saratoga	Saratoga

Yattalunga is a south-eastern suburb of the Central Coast region of New South Wales, Australia. It is located approximately six kilometres south-east of the city of Gosford and is part of the Central Coast Council local government area. In the 2021 census, Yattalunga had a population of 580 people.

== History ==
In January 1994, a study was conducted on the area's drainage "to determine future land uses in consideration of the sensitive local environment". The report concluded that a number of constraints may limit development of the land, such as flooding. However, the report did state some areas where residential lots would be viable.

In 2014, Gosford City Council rejected an application for the construction of a Woolworths in the area due to the proximity of other supermarkets, the need for rezoning of conserved bushland, and the significant pressure it would place on local businesses.

== Demographics ==
In the 2011 census, Yattalunga recorded a population of 527 people, 50.7% female and 49.3% male with 2.6% being Indigenous Australian. The median age of the population was 40 years, 3 years above the national median of 37. 83.0% of people living in Yattalunga were born in Australia. The other top responses for country of birth were England 6.0%, New Zealand 2.3%, Ireland 0.9%, Japan 0.8% and Cyprus 0.6%. 94.1% of people spoke only English at home; the next most common languages were 0.8% Maltese, 0.6% Greek, 0.6% Portuguese, 0.6% Japanese and 0.6% Korean.

In the 2016 census, Yattalunga recorded a population of 551 people, 50.6% female and 49.4% male with 3.1% being Indigenous Australian. The median age of the population was 38 years, on par with the national median. 86.7% of people living in Yattalunga were born in Australia. The other top responses for country of birth were England 6.0%, South Africa 1.3%, New Zealand 0.7%, Canada 0.7% and Scotland 0.6%. 95.6% of people spoke only English at home; the next most common languages were 0.6% French, 0.6% Greek and 0.6% Portuguese.

In the 2021 census, Yattalunga recorded a population of 580 people, 50.3% female and 49.7% male with 1.7% being Indigenous Australian. The median age of the population was 41 years, 3 years above the national median of 38. 83.8% of people living in Yattalunga were born in Australia. The other top responses for country of birth were England 6.2%, Scotland 1.6%, New Zealand 0.9%, Ireland 0.7% and the Netherlands 0.7%. 95.0% of people spoke only English at home; the next most common languages were 1.0% Greek, 0.5% Portuguese, 0.5% Polish and 0.5% Auslan.

== See also ==
- List of Central Coast, New South Wales suburbs
