= Bensville =

Bensville Central Coast, New South Wales
- Coordinates: 33°29′55″S 151°23′05″E
- Population: 2,545 (2016 census)
  - Density: 1,270/km^{2} (3,300/sq mi)
- Postcode(s): 2251
- Elevation: 20 m (66 ft)
- Area: 2.0 km^{2} (0.8 sq mi)
- Location: 17 km (11 mi) SSE of Gosford; 11 km (7 mi) E of Woy Woy; 89 km (55 mi) NNE of Sydney
- LGA(s): Central Coast Council
- Parish: Kincumber
- State electorate(s): Terrigal
- Federal division(s): Robertson
Suburbs around Bensville:
Kincumber South	Kincumber South	Macmasters Beach
Empire Bay	Bensville	Macmasters Beach
Empire Bay	Bouddi	Bouddi

Bensville is a suburb of the Central Coast region of New South Wales, Australia. It is part of the Central Coast Council local government area.

The main section of Bensville is centred on Kallaroo Road, and consists of a small park, cafe, general store and hairdressers. A small combination of shops have recently been added in 2005. There is a small wharf located at the end of Kallaroo Road, which is a popular local fishing spot.

== History ==
Bensville is named after a pioneer of the area, Benjamin Davis. His father had been a school teacher at Kincumber and Davistown is named after his family. Benjamin started a shipbuilding business around 1850 and also owned 1,000 acres (4.05 km^{2}) of land there. When a post office was opened, it was named Bensville, in honour of the pioneer.
