= MacMasters Beach, New South Wales =

Coordinates: 33°29′24″S 151°25′34″E

MacMasters Beach Central Coast, New South Wales
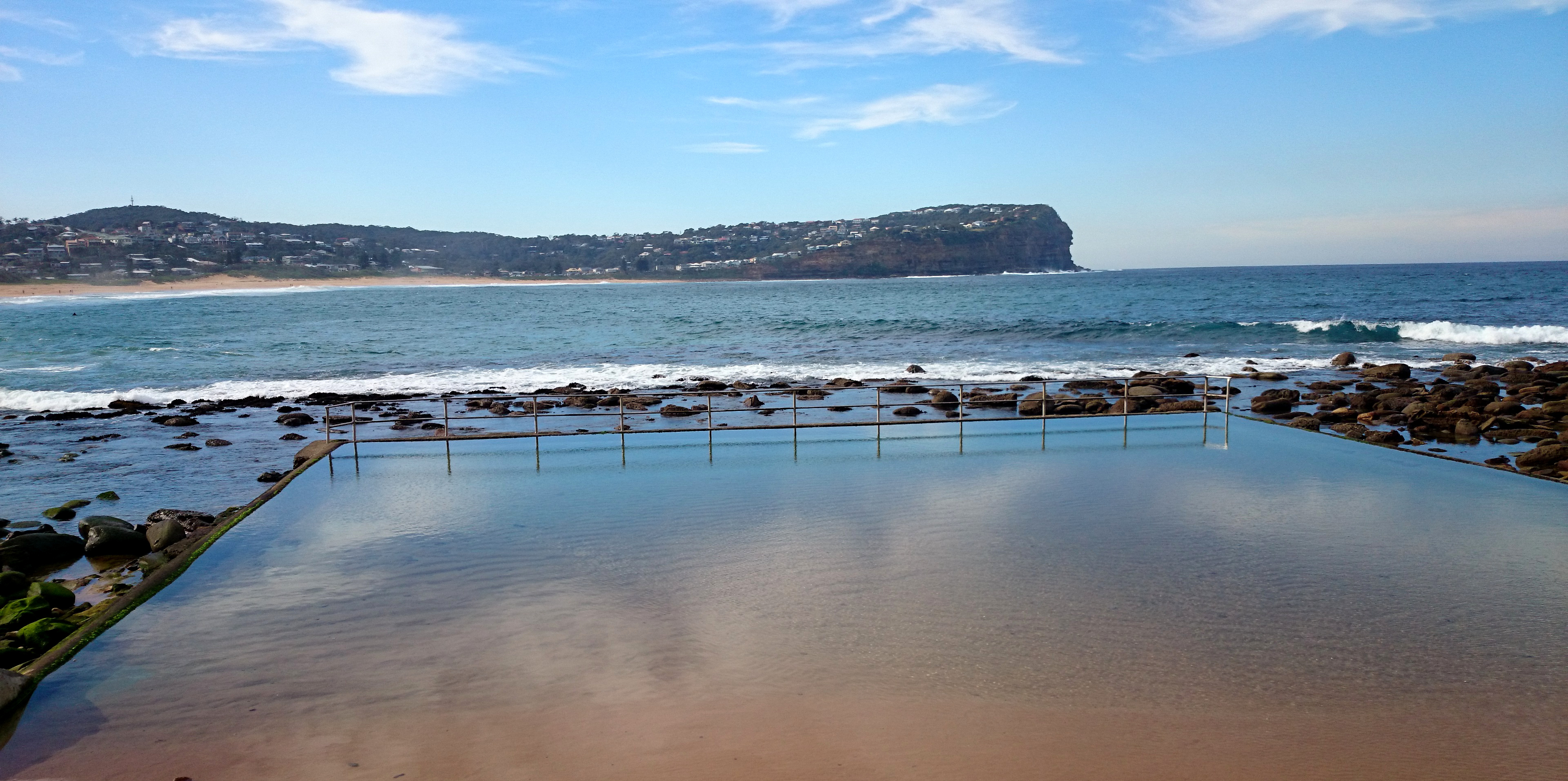
- Population: 1,294 (2016 census)
  - Density: 479/km^{2} (1,241/sq mi)
- Postcode(s): 2251
- Elevation: 8 m (26 ft)
- Area: 2.7 km^{2} (1.0 sq mi)
- Location: 17 km (11 mi) SE of Gosford; 16 km (10 mi) E of Woy Woy; 90 km (56 mi) NNE of Sydney
- LGA(s): Central Coast Council
- Parish: Kincumber
- State electorate(s): Terrigal
- Federal division(s): Robertson
Suburbs around MacMasters Beach:
Kincumber South	Kincumber	Copacabana
Bensville	MacMasters Beach	Tasman Sea
Bensville	Bouddi

MacMasters Beach is a south-eastern suburb of the Central Coast region of New South Wales, Australia on the Bouddi Peninsula. It is part of the Central Coast Council local government area

It was named after Allan MacMaster who was one of the first land owners in this area in 1855 after coming to Australia in 1839 from Scotland. Locals often describe it as having a 'village feel' and strong sense of community.

== Notable residents ==
Beryl Guertner who led Australian House and Garden for 25 years retired here with her partner in 1973.

Max Judd who was a famous chess player who lived here for his entire life. He built a home on a 40 acre farm, alongside the beautiful Cockrone Lagoon.

== Gallery ==
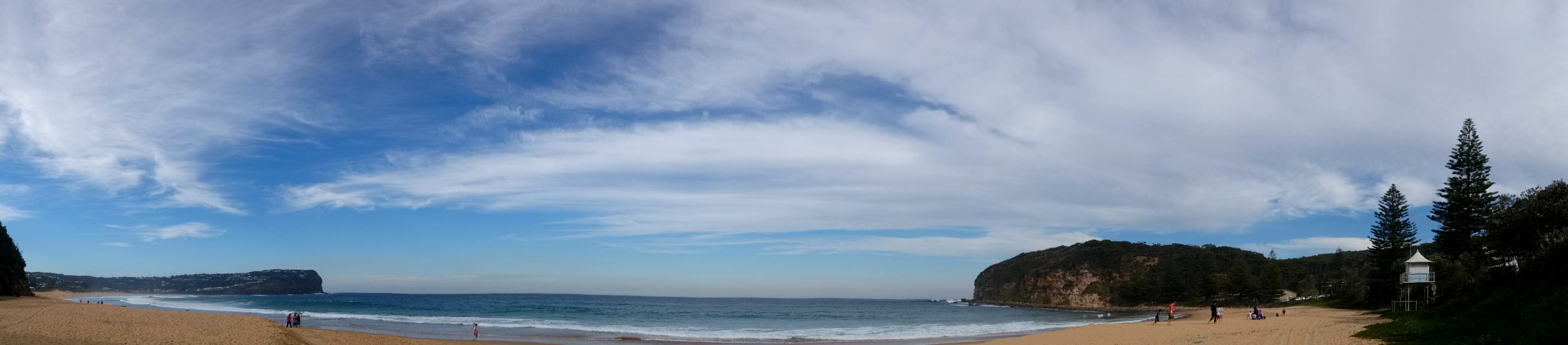
MacMasters Beach panoramic view

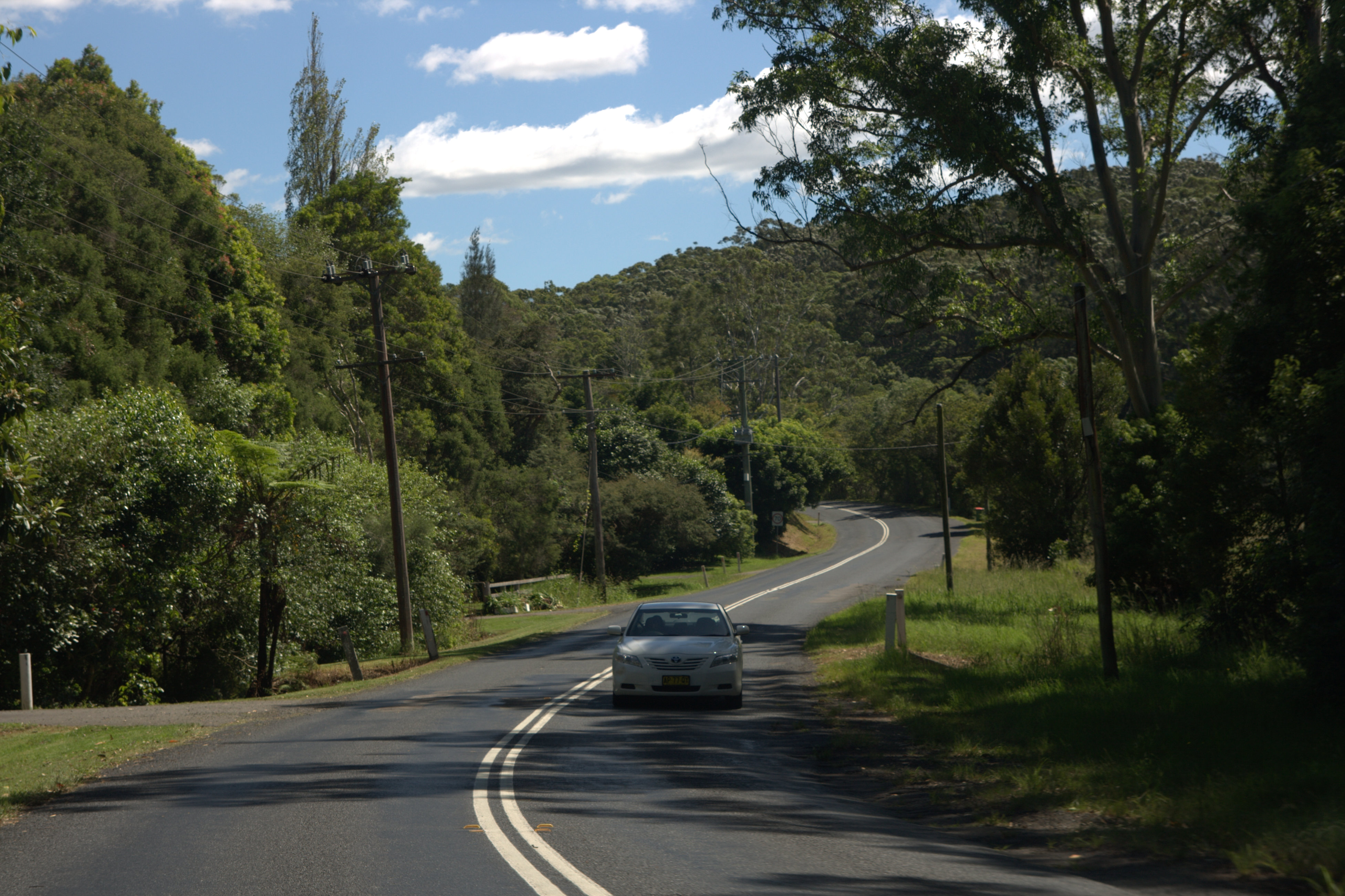
Scenic Road Drive

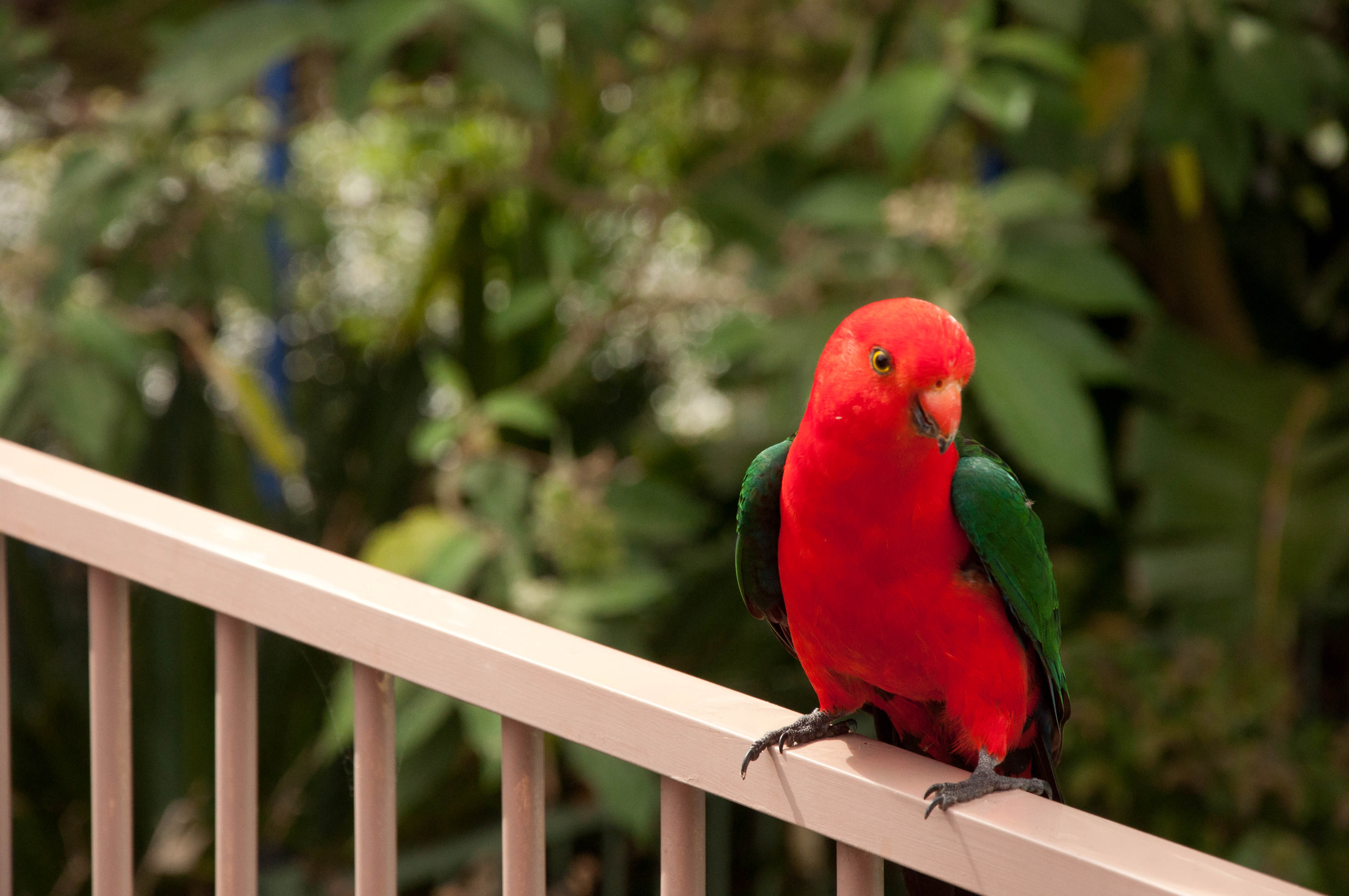
Local wildlife

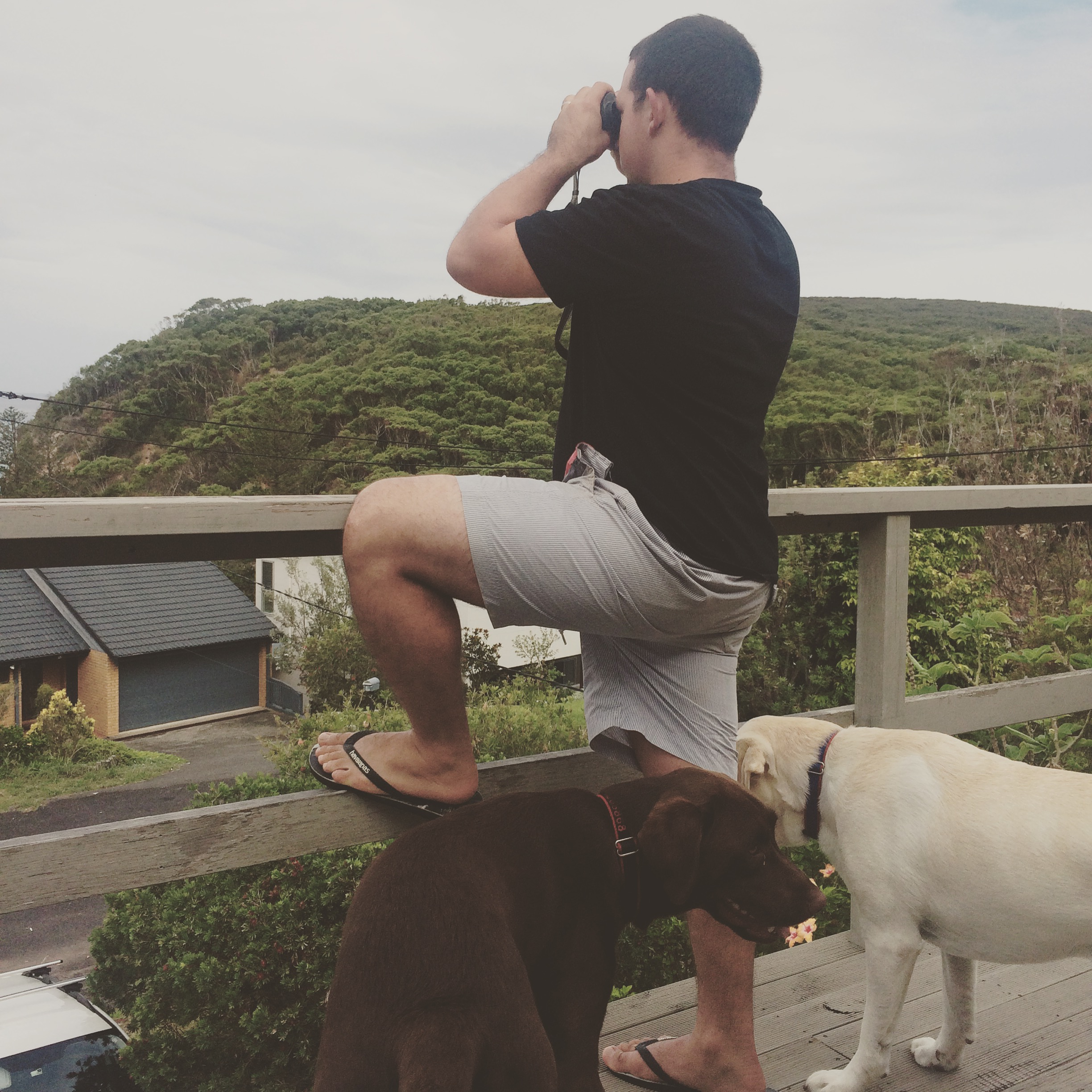
Beach house lookout
