= Picketts Valley =

Coordinates: 33°27′25″S 151°24′36″E

- Suburb
- Interactive map of Picketts Valley
- Country: Australia
- State: New South Wales
- City: Central Coast
- LGA: Central Coast Council
- Location: 13 km (8.1 mi) ESE of Gosford; 5 km (3.1 mi) SW of Terrigal; 19 km (12 mi) SSW of The Entrance; 97 km (60 mi) NNE of Sydney

Government
  - State electorate: Terrigal
  - Federal division: Robertson

Area
  - Total: 2.5 km^{2} (0.97 sq mi)
- Elevation: 15 m (49 ft)

Population
  - Total: 218 (2016 census)
  - Density: 87.2/km^{2} (226/sq mi)
- Postcode: 2251
- Parish: Kincumber
Suburbs around Picketts Valley
Erina	Terrigal	Terrigal
Green Point	Picketts Valley	Terrigal
Kincumber	Kincumber	Avoca Beach

Picketts Valley is a semi-rural suburb of the Central Coast region of New South Wales, Australia. It is in the Central Coast Council local government area.
