= St Huberts Island, New South Wales =

Australian suburb

Coordinates: 33°29′56″S 151°21′04″E

St Huberts Island Central Coast, New South Wales
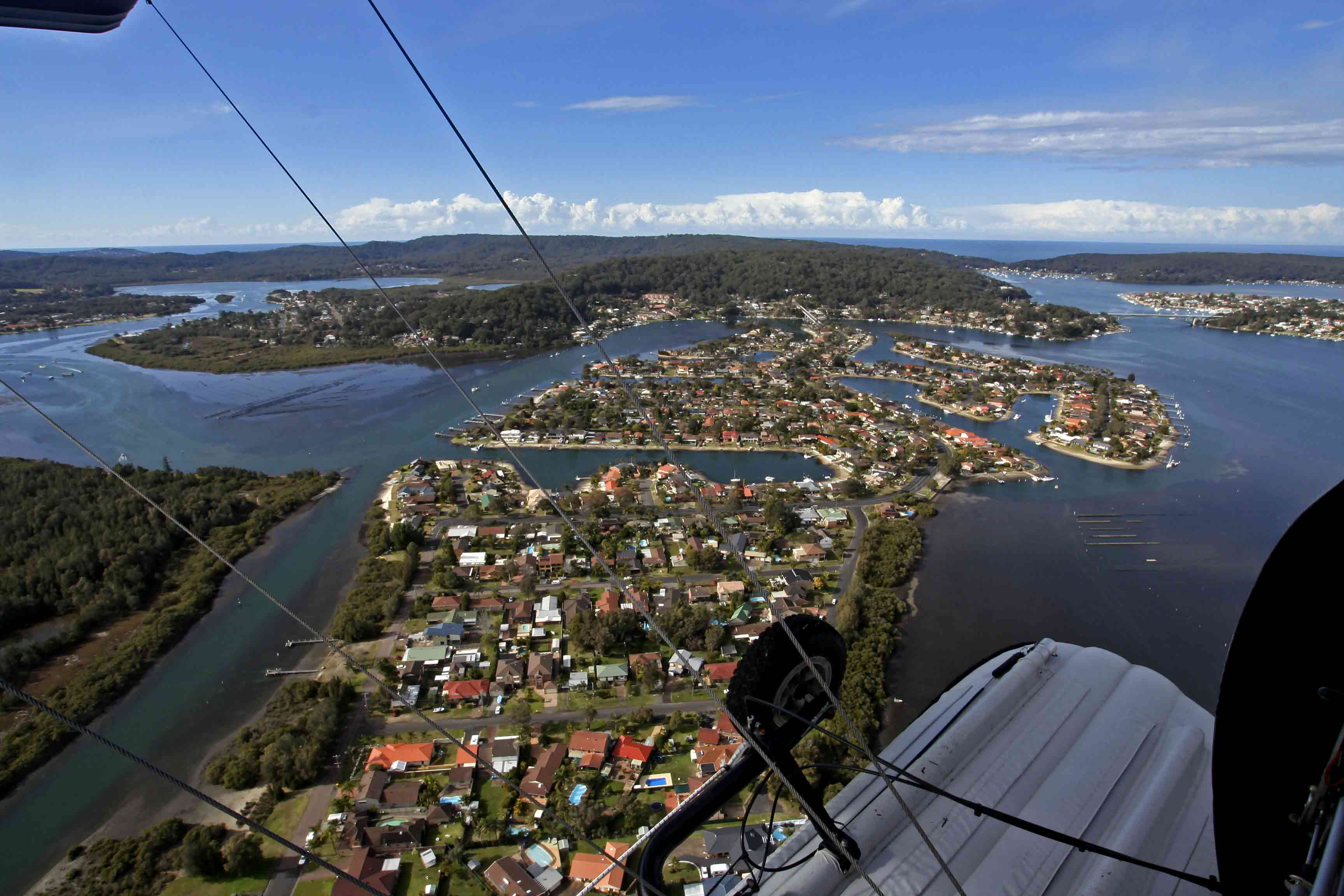
- Population: 1,080 (2021 census)
  - Density: 1,800/km^{2} (4,700/sq mi)
- Postcode(s): 2257
- Elevation: 3 m (10 ft)
- Area: 0.6 km^{2} (0.2 sq mi)
- Location: 5 km (3 mi) E of Woy Woy; 18 km (11 mi) S of Gosford; 88 km (55 mi) NNE of Sydney
- LGA(s): Central Coast Council
- Parish: Kincumber
- State electorate(s): Terrigal
- Federal division(s): Robertson
Suburbs around St Huberts Island:
Woy Woy	Saratoga	Davistown
Woy Woy	St Huberts Island	Empire Bay
Blackwall	Daleys Point	Daleys Point

St Huberts Island is a canal estate and suburb of the Central Coast region of New South Wales, Australia connected to the mainland at Daleys Point. It is part of the Central Coast Council local government area.

The modern-day development of St Huberts Island happened when Hooker-Rex Developments (now LJ Hooker Realty) built residential developments on the site in the early 1970s.

The population of the suburb recorded at the 2021 census was 1,080.

== Transport ==
Busways operates two bus routes through the suburb of St Huberts Island:

- 59: Wagstaffe to Woy Woy via Empire Bay
- 64: Woy Woy To Gosford Via Ettalong, Kincumber and Erina Fair
