= Electoral district of Terrigal =

Terrigal New South Wales—Legislative Assembly
- Interactive map of district boundaries from the 2023 state election
- State: New South Wales
- Dates current: 2007–present
- MP: Adam Crouch
- Party: Liberal Party
- Namesake: Terrigal
- Electors: 58,056 (2023)
- Area: 128.45 km^{2} (49.6 sq mi)
- Demographic: Provincial
Electorates around Terrigal:
The Entrance	The Entrance	Pacific Ocean
Gosford	Terrigal	Pacific Ocean
Pittwater	Pacific Ocean	Pacific Ocean

Terrigal is an electoral district of the Legislative Assembly in the Australian state of New South Wales. It is represented by Adam Crouch of the Liberal Party.

It includes the affluent southeastern suburbs of the Central Coast Council in the Central Coast region. Terrigal has never won by the Labor Party; however it became a marginal seat following the 2023 election.

== History ==
Terrigal was created at the redistribution prior to the 2007 election and consisted of much of the district of Gosford, then held by Chris Hartcher for the Liberal Party, while Gosford absorbed most of the former district of Peats, then held by Marie Andrews for the Labor Party. Antony Green describes the redistribution as effectively being that Gosford was renamed Terrigal while Peats was renamed Gosford.

Since 2015, it has been the only seat on the Central Coast held by the Liberal Party. The Central Coast (particularly around Gosford and The Entrance) is typically a highly competitive region for both major parties on all three levels of politics.

== Geography ==
On its current boundaries, Terrigal takes in the suburbs and towns of Avoca Beach, Bensville, Bouddi, Box Head, Copacabana, Davistown, Empire Bay, Erina, Erina Heights, Forresters Beach, Green Point, Holgate, Killcare, Killcare Heights, Kincumber, Kincumber South, MacMasters Beach, Matcham, North Avoca, Picketts Valley, Pretty Beach, Saratoga, Springfield, St Huberts Island, Terrigal, Wagstaffe, Wamberal, Yattalunga and parts of East Gosford and North Gosford.

== Members for Terrigal ==
Member	Party	Term
Chris Hartcher	Liberal	2007–2014
Chris Hartcher	Independent	2014–2015
Adam Crouch	Liberal	2015–present

== Election results ==
2023 New South Wales state election: Terrigal
Party	Candidate	Votes	%	±%
Liberal	Adam Crouch	23,507	46.6	−6.3
Labor	Sam Boughton	19,703	39.0	+12.9
Greens	Imogen da Silva	4,868	9.6	−0.4
Sustainable Australia	Wayne Rigg	2,392	4.7	+2.8
Total formal votes		50,470	97.5	+0.8
Informal votes		1,270	2.5	−0.8
Turnout		51,740	89.1	−1.2
Two-party-preferred result
Liberal	Adam Crouch	24,467	51.2	−11.1
Labor	Sam Boughton	23,300	48.8	+11.1
Liberal hold		Swing	−11.1	
