= Kincumber South =

Coordinates: 33°28′55″S 151°22′05″E

- Suburb
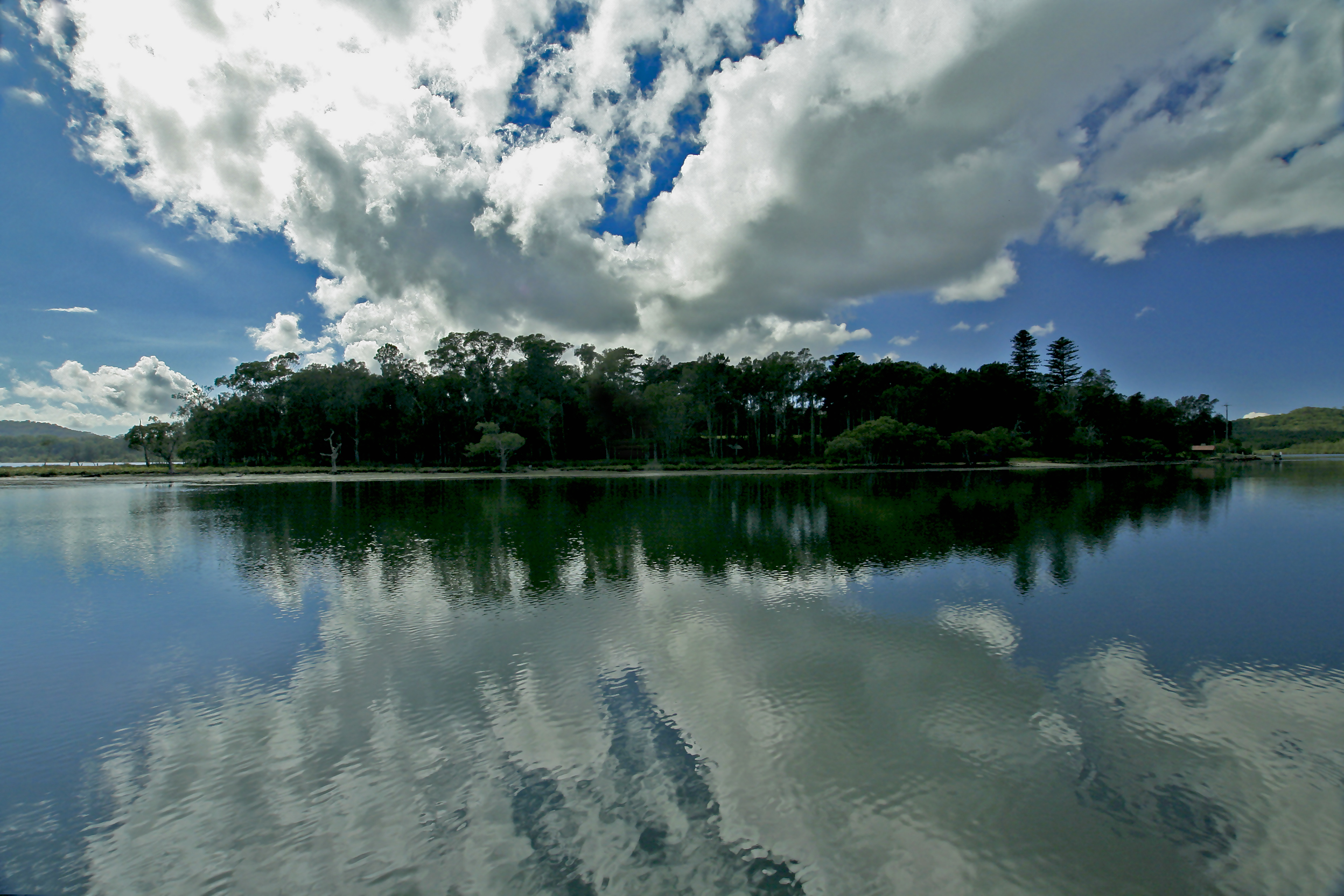
- Kincumber South over the water viewed from Davistown
- Interactive map of Kincumber South
- Country: Australia
- State: New South Wales
- City: Central Coast
- LGA: Central Coast Council
- Location: 14 km (8.7 mi) SE of Gosford; 9 km (5.6 mi) SW of Terrigal; 87 km (54 mi) NNE of Sydney; 23 km (14 mi) SW of The Entrance

Government
  - State electorate: Terrigal
  - Federal division: Robertson

Area
  - Total: 1.3 km^{2} (0.50 sq mi)
- Elevation: 14 m (46 ft)

Population
  - Total: 681 (2011 census)
  - Density: 524/km^{2} (1,360/sq mi)
- Postcode: 2251
- Parish: Kincumber
Suburbs around Kincumber South
	Kincumber
Davistown	Kincumber South	Bensville
	Bensville

Kincumber South is a south-eastern suburb of the Central Coast region of New South Wales, Australia. It is part of the Central Coast Council local government area.
