= Copacabana, New South Wales =

Copacabana
- Suburb
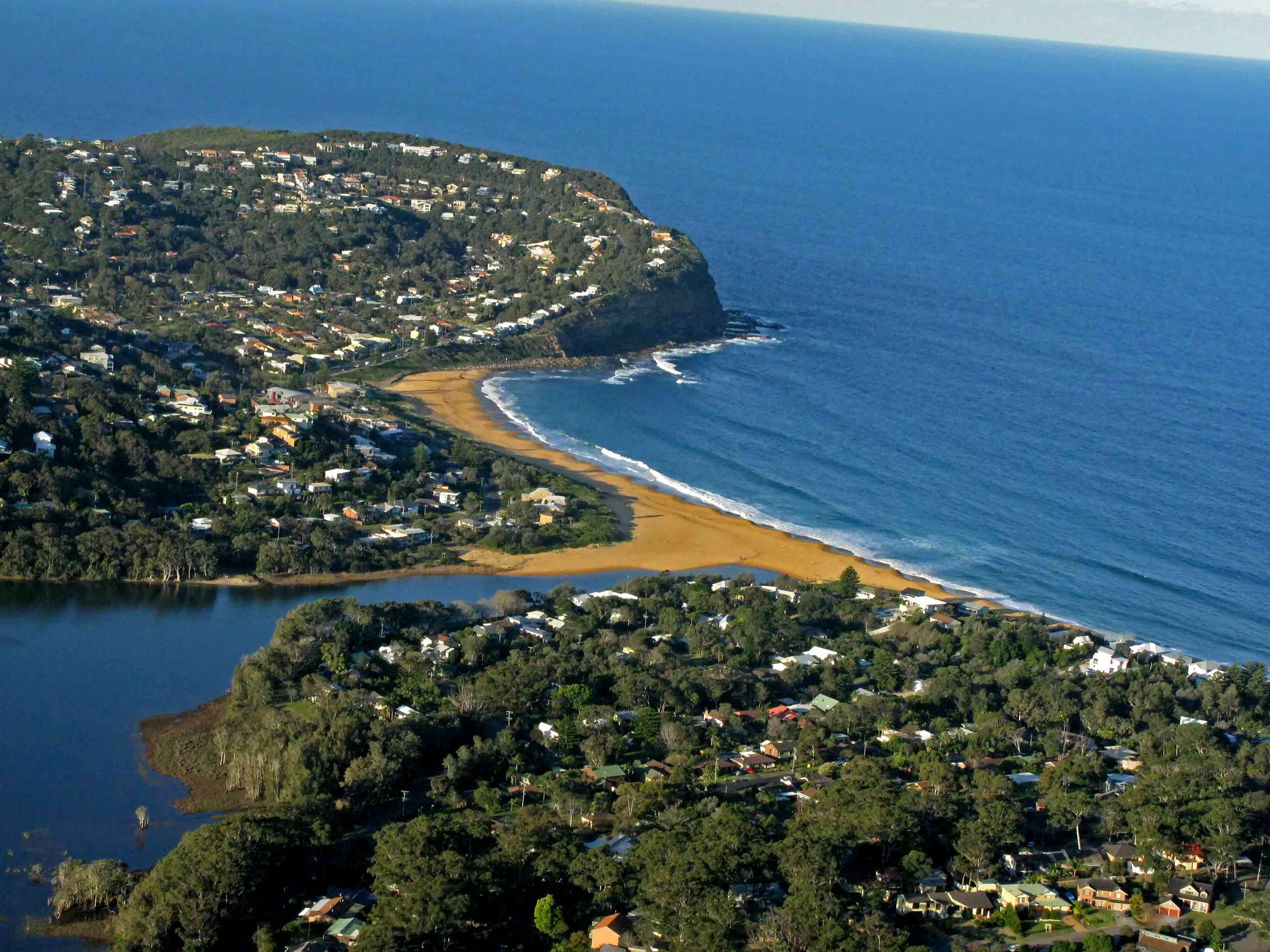
- Aerial view of Copacabana

- Interactive map of Copacabana
- Coordinates: 33°29′24″S 151°26′06″E
- Country: Australia
- State: New South Wales
- City: Central Coast
- LGA: Central Coast Council
- Location: 17 km (11 mi) SE of Gosford; 19 km (12 mi) E of Woy Woy; 91 km (57 mi) NNE of Sydney

Government
  - State electorate: Terrigal
  - Federal division: Robertson

Area
  - Total: 2.3 km^{2} (0.89 sq mi)
- Elevation: 15 m (49 ft)

Population
  - Total: 2,735 (2016 census)
  - Density: 1,189/km^{2} (3,080/sq mi)
- Postcode: 2251
- Parish: Kincumber
Suburbs around Copacabana
	Avoca Beach
Kincumber	Copacabana	Tasman Sea
Macmasters Beach		Tasman Sea

Copacabana is a suburb located on the Central Coast of New South Wales, Australia, as part of the Central Coast Council local government area. Copacabana (so named by real estate developers Willmore and Randell, in the mid twentieth century) is situated at the northern end of Macmasters Beach, the two beaches divided by Cochrone Lagoon. The northern headland of Copacabana beach is Tudibaring Point, purported to mean 'place where the waves pound like a beating heart' in the local indigenous language. The bay itself is Allagai, which means "nest of snakes" in the same language.

== Geography ==
Copacabana is located on the Tasman Sea 17.4 kilometres (11 mi) southeast of the Gosford central business district, and about halfway between Newcastle and Sydney. It is bordered to the south by the Tasman Sea, to the southwest by Cochrone Lagoon and Macmasters Beach and to the north by Avoca Beach.

== Population ==
In the 2016 census, there were 2,735 people in Copacabana. 79.5% of people were born in Australia. The next most common countries of birth was England at 5.9%. 89.8% of people spoke only English at home. The most common responses for religion were No Religion 36.5%, Catholic 22.1% and Anglican 18.1%.

In October 2024, Australian prime minister Anthony Albanese purchased a clifftop home for $4.3 million.
