= Bouddi, New South Wales =

Bouddi Central Coast, New South Wales
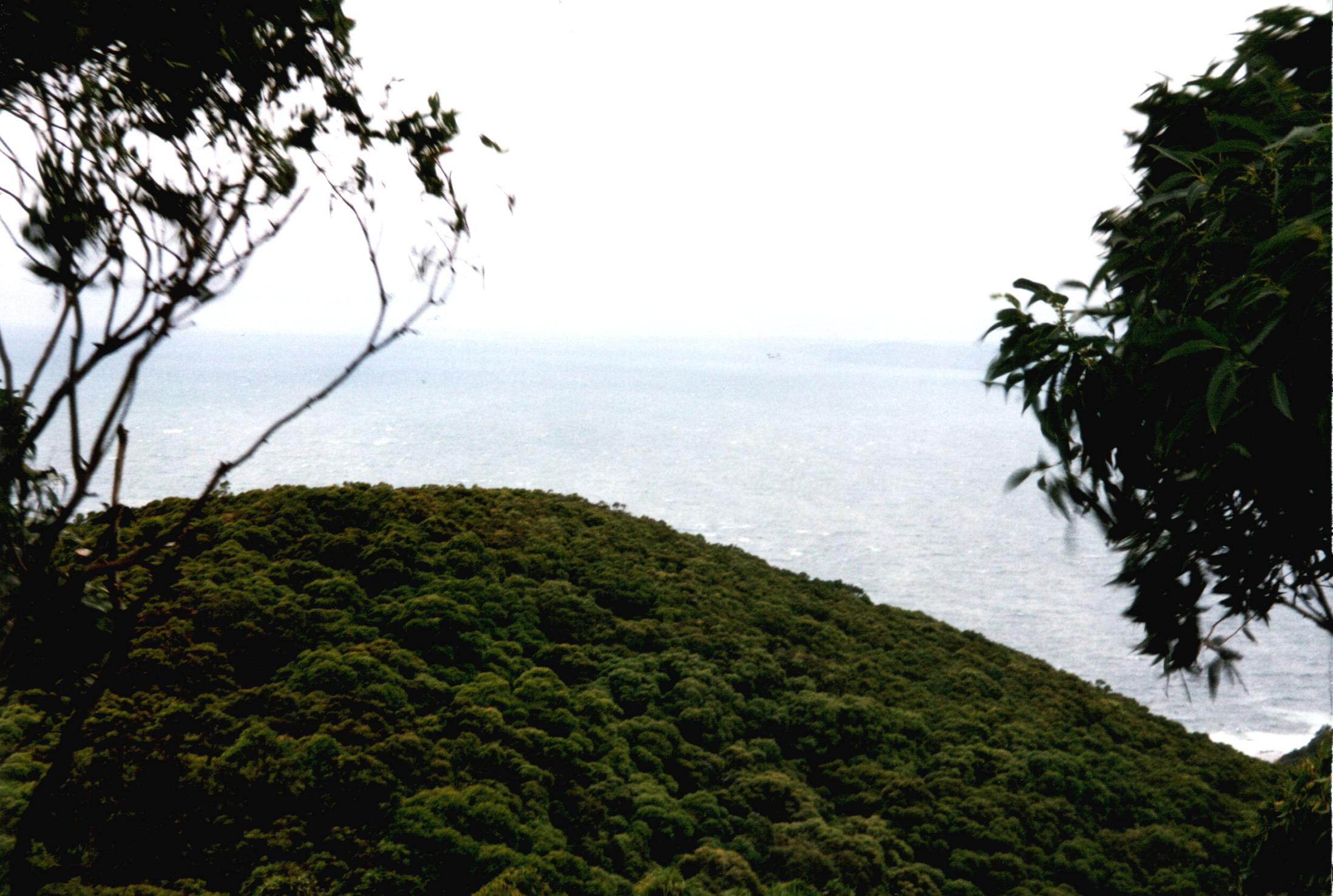

- Coordinates: 33°31′05″S 151°24′00″E
- Population: 5 (SAL 2021)
- Postcode(s): 2251
- Elevation: 160 m (525 ft)
- Location: 21 km (13 mi) SSE of Gosford; 11 km (7 mi) ESE of Woy Woy; 94 km (58 mi) NNE of Sydney
- LGA(s): Central Coast Council
- Parish: Kincumber
- State electorate(s): Terrigal
- Federal division(s): Robertson
Suburbs around Bouddi:
Bensville	Macmasters Beach
Killcare Heights	Bouddi	Tasman Sea
	Tasman Sea

Bouddi (/bʊdaɪ/) is a coastal south-eastern locality on the Central Coast of New South Wales, Australia. It is in the Central Coast Council local government area. Bouddi is the Aboriginal word for the heart.

The Bouddi area locally refers to the Bouddi Peninsula and the associated suburbs of Killcare, Killcare Heights, Hardys Bay, Pretty Beach, Wagstaffe and Macmasters Beach. All of these suburbs/villages fringe Bouddi National Park that includes Maitland Bay.

== See also ==
- Bouddi National Park
