= Saratoga, New South Wales =

Coordinates: 33°28′30″S 151°20′53″E

Saratoga Central Coast, New South Wales
- Saratoga coast
- Population: 3,938 (2016 census)
  - Density: 1,790/km^{2} (4,640/sq mi)
- Postcode(s): 2251
- Elevation: 7 m (23 ft)
- Area: 2.2 km^{2} (0.8 sq mi)
- Location: 11 km (7 mi) S of Gosford; 12 km (7 mi) WSW of Terrigal; 85 km (53 mi) N of Sydney
- LGA(s): Central Coast Council
- Parish: Kincumber
- State electorate(s): Terrigal
- Federal division(s): Robertson
Suburbs around Saratoga:
Brisbane Water		Yattalunga
Koolewong	Saratoga
Woy Woy	St Huberts Island	Davistown

Saratoga is a residential south-eastern village and suburb of the Central Coast region of New South Wales, Australia, located on a peninsula of Brisbane Water and part of the Central Coast Council local government area. The suburb is characterised by its largely settled shoreline, with houses extending up coastal slopes to the base of the tall hills that comprise the core of the peninsula.

The village of Saratoga occupies the central portion of its peninsula, bordered towards the point by Davistown and toward the mainland by Yattalunga.

Initially utilised by indigenous peoples, the area of Saratoga was first used by European settlers for citrus orchards, after John Bourke and his family settled in the area in 1863. Bourke went on to become a pioneer in commercial citrus growing in the area of Brisbane Water. Sporadic building occurred thereafter, including the notable Federation-style house 'Rosemount', built in 1917 and surviving on 0.5 ha of land at the corner of Village Road and Brooklyn Road. In recent decades, housing development has transformed most of Saratoga into an outer residential suburb of Gosford. Bordered on three sides by water, Saratoga has also become a favourite haunt of fishermen and sports people.

Most residents commute to Gosford, Kincumber or Erina for their daily needs, with few working in the suburb itself. Saratoga has a small shopping centre located on Village Road, which includes a petrol station, a general store, a hairdresser, a newsagency, a liquor outlet, a pharmacy, two takeaway shops, a bakery and a jeweller.

Brisbania Public School stands at the corner of High Street and Davistown Road.

Saratoga is the home of the Saratoga Hawks, a Junior Australian Football Club established in 2001.

== Heritage listings ==
Saratoga has a number of heritage-listed sites, including:

- 36 Village Road: Rosemount
