= Kincumber =

Coordinates: 33°27′54″S 151°23′35″E

- Suburb
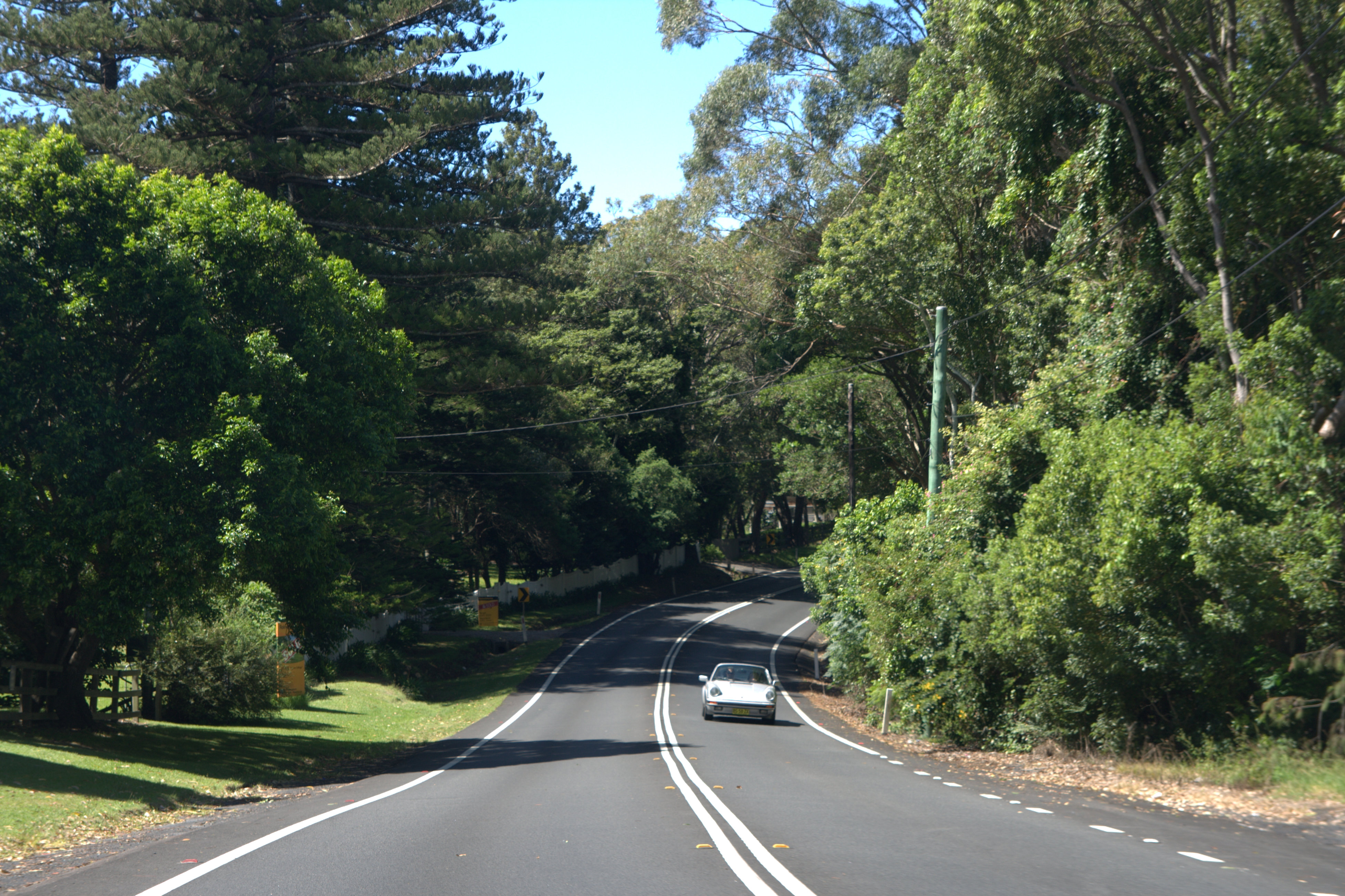
- Interactive map of Kincumber
- Country: Australia
- State: New South Wales
- City: Central Coast
- LGA: Central Coast Council
- Location: 12 km (7.5 mi) SE of Gosford; 7 km (4.3 mi) WSW of Terrigal; 87 km (54 mi) NNE of Sydney; 21 km (13 mi) SW of The Entrance

Government
  - State electorate: Terrigal
  - Federal division: Robertson

Area
  - Total: 8.0 km^{2} (3.1 sq mi)
- Elevation: 8 m (26 ft)

Population
  - Total: 7,093 (2016 census)
  - Density: 887/km^{2} (2,296/sq mi)
- Postcode: 2251
- Parish: Kincumber
Suburbs around Kincumber
Green Point	Green Point	Picketts Valley
Yattalunga	Kincumber	Avoca Beach
Kincumber South	Macmasters Beach	Copacabana

Kincumber is a south-eastern suburb of the Central Coast region of New South Wales, Australia, nested between the Kincumba Mountain Reserve and the Kincumber Broadwater and located 87 kilometres (54 mi) north of Sydney via the Sydney–Newcastle Freeway (M1). It is part of the Central Coast Council local government area. It is on Darkinjung land.

A nature reserve, Kincumba Mountain, is located within the suburb and is often used by the community for various functions, including picnicking, bush-walking, orienteering, parties, and carnivals.

Kincumber is also a skateboarding hub of the Central Coast. It has two skate facilities, one in Frost Reserve and the other in South Kincumber recreation area.

== History ==
The name derives from the local Aboriginal word "kincumba", meaning "towards the rising sun" or "to tomorrow". A large open flat rock area at the highest plateau of Kincumba Mountain, which commands panoramic views of the region, was used by Kuringgai people as a meeting place and camp. Being the highest open position in the region, it was first to receive the morning sun as it broke over the eastern horizon Tasman Sea/Pacific Ocean, and so this area was also referred to as "towards tomorrow". Signs of habitation in the Kincumber area include axe-grinding grooves and rock engravings on Kincumba Mountain. Due to the freshwater creek, water access from Brisbane Water and the Hawkesbury River, and an abundance of old rainforest timber in the surrounding valley hills, Kincumber was one of the earliest settlements on the Central Coast, supplying wood for the needs of the growing colony at Sydney in the early 19th century.

Boat building became an early local secondary industry after timber-getting, to meet the primary necessity of water transport. Boat-building along Kincumber Creek continued until the early 20th century. The last ship was built in the area in 1906 by George Frost. It was called the SS Rock Lily.

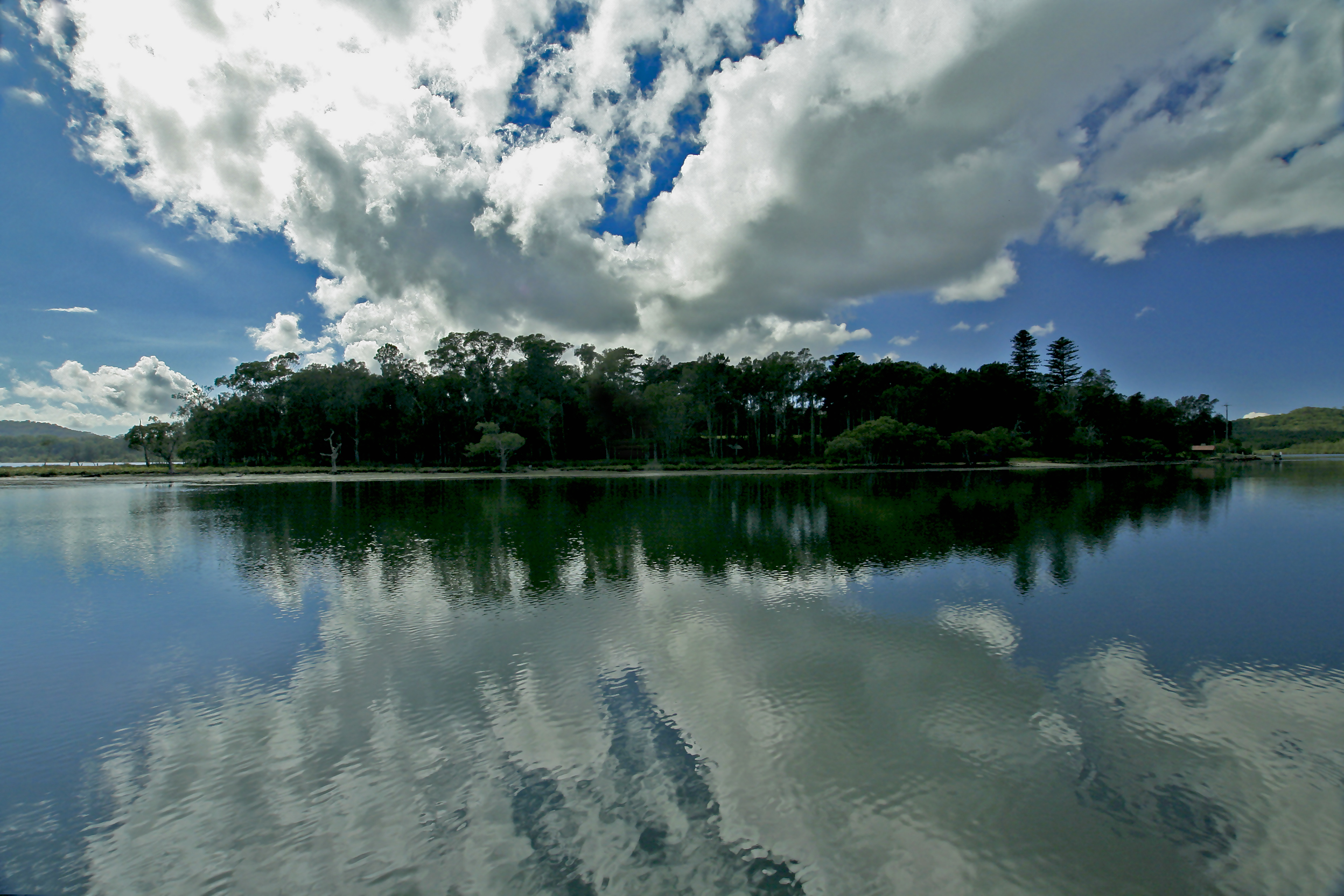
Kincumber Wharf

Kincumber was once home to a monazite processing plant that processed mineral sands mined in the local area. The plant was located on the edge of Kincumber industrial estate, adjacent to Kincumber Creek. The site is now abandoned and has been deemed unsafe for development due to higher than average radiation levels.

During the mid-1980s, the town made international headlines during the Eve van Grafhorst case. Van Grafhorst, a young girl who contracted HIV through an infected blood transfusion, was not permitted to attend pre-school. The attitude of local residents and the local council led the girl and her family to move to Hastings, New Zealand, where she later died from the disease in 1993 at the age of eleven.

On 28 August 2000, the Olympic torch relay passed through Kincumber en route to the Sydney Olympic Stadium.

== Population ==
According to the 2016 census there were 7,093 people in Kincumber.

- Aboriginal and Torres Strait Islander people made up 2.8% of the population.
- 80.2% of people were born in Australia. The next most common countries of birth were England 6.5% and New Zealand 1.4%.
- 92.5% of people spoke only English at home.
- The most common responses for religion were No Religion 26.1%, Catholic 25.2% and Anglican 24.1%.

== Facilities ==
As of January 2020, Kincumber has a high school, primary school, hotel, shopping centre, library, several restaurants, fast food outlets and a licensed post office.

== Politics ==
At a federal level, Kincumber is within the Division of Robertson. Previously held on a safe margin by Jim Lloyd of the Liberal Party, the seat changed hands in the 2007 federal election to the Australian Labor Party's Belinda Neal. In 2010 the seat was won by Labor member Deborah O'Neill. After the 2013 federal election, Lucy Wicks of the Liberal party held office. The May federal election of 2022, saw Dr Gordon Reid of the Australian Labor Party, win the seat of Robertson.

In the New South Wales Legislative Assembly, Kincumber is within the electorate of Terrigal, currently held by Adam Crouch of the Liberal Party.

Polling place statistics are presented below combining the votes from the Kincumber, Kincumber Central and Scaysbrook polling places in the federal and state elections as indicated.

2007 federal election Source: AEC
Liberal	47.1%
Labor	42.8%
Greens	6.06%
CDP	2.12%
One Nation	1.00%

2007 state election Source: ECNSW
Liberal	47.5%
Labor	38.5%
Greens	7.02%
CDP	3.02%
AAFI	1.95%

2004 federal election Source: AEC
Liberal	56.1%
Labor	34.3%
Greens	7.00%
Family First	1.31%
One Nation	1.16%

2003 state election Source: ECNSW
Labor	45.9%
Liberal	45.6%
Greens	5.43%
SOS	1.61%
Democrats	1.07%

2001 federal election Source: AEC
Liberal	51.6%
Labor	33.5%
Democrats	3.23%
One Nation	2.83%
Independent	2.81%

1999 state election Source: ECNSW
Liberal	42.1%
Labor	41.0%
One Nation	6.71%
Democrats	3.57%
CDP	2.82%
