= Adam Crouch =

Australian politician

Adam Crouch MP

Opposition Whip
- Incumbent
- Assumed office 21 April 2023
- Leader: Mark Speakman
- Preceded by: Anna Watson

Government Whip
- In office 30 April 2019 – 15 February 2022
- Premier: Gladys Berejiklian; Dominic Perrottet
- Preceded by: Chris Patterson
- Succeeded by: Nathaniel Smith

Member of the New South Wales Parliament for Terrigal
- Incumbent
- Assumed office 28 March 2015

Personal details
- Party: Liberal Party

Adam Sibery Crouch is an Australian politician who was elected to the New South Wales Legislative Assembly as the member for Terrigal for the Liberal Party at the 2015 New South Wales state election. After the 2019 New South Wales state election he was elected as the NSW Government Whip.

Crouch was a sales director for a printing firm before entering parliament, and won a close preselection against former federal government minister Jim Lloyd by a single vote.

He is the patron of the Terrigal Marine Rescue Squadron and Terrigal Surf Lifesaving Club and also an honorary member of the Terrigal Rotary and member of the NSW Parliamentary Lions Club.

== See also ==
- Results of the New South Wales state elections: 2015, 2019 and 2023

New South Wales Legislative Assembly
Preceded by Chris Hartcher	Member for Terrigal; 2015–present	Incumbent
