= Terrigal =

- Town
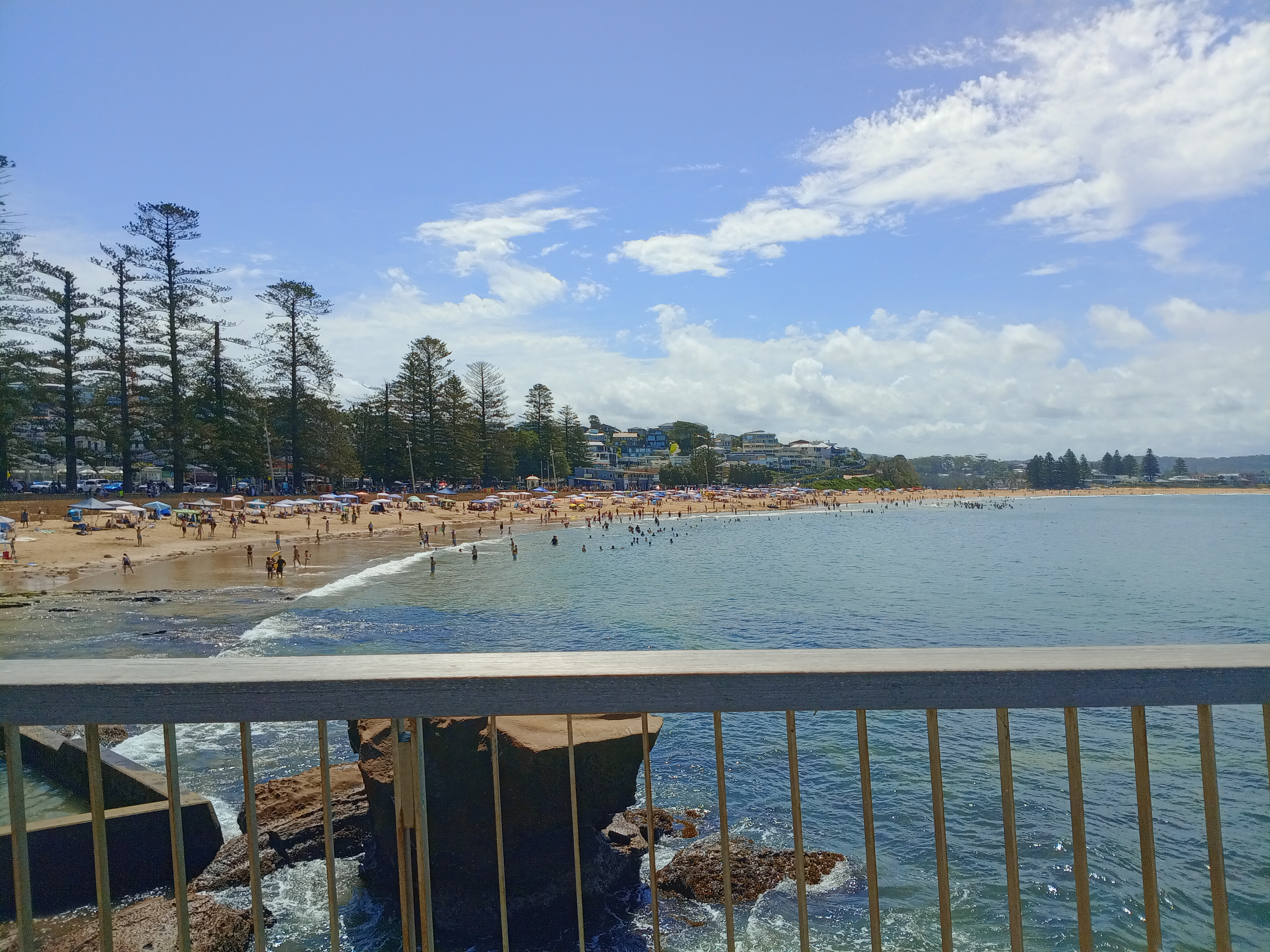
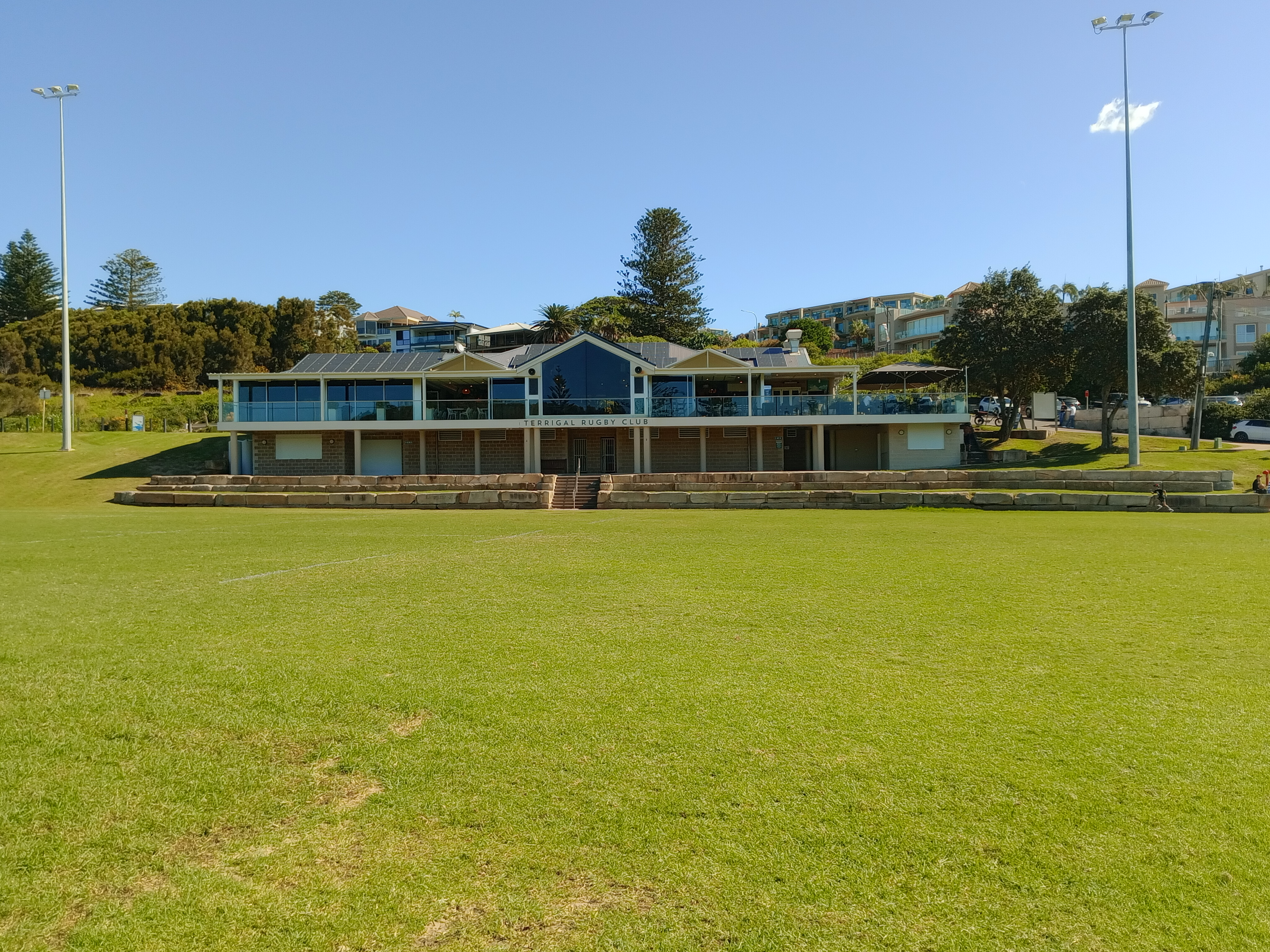
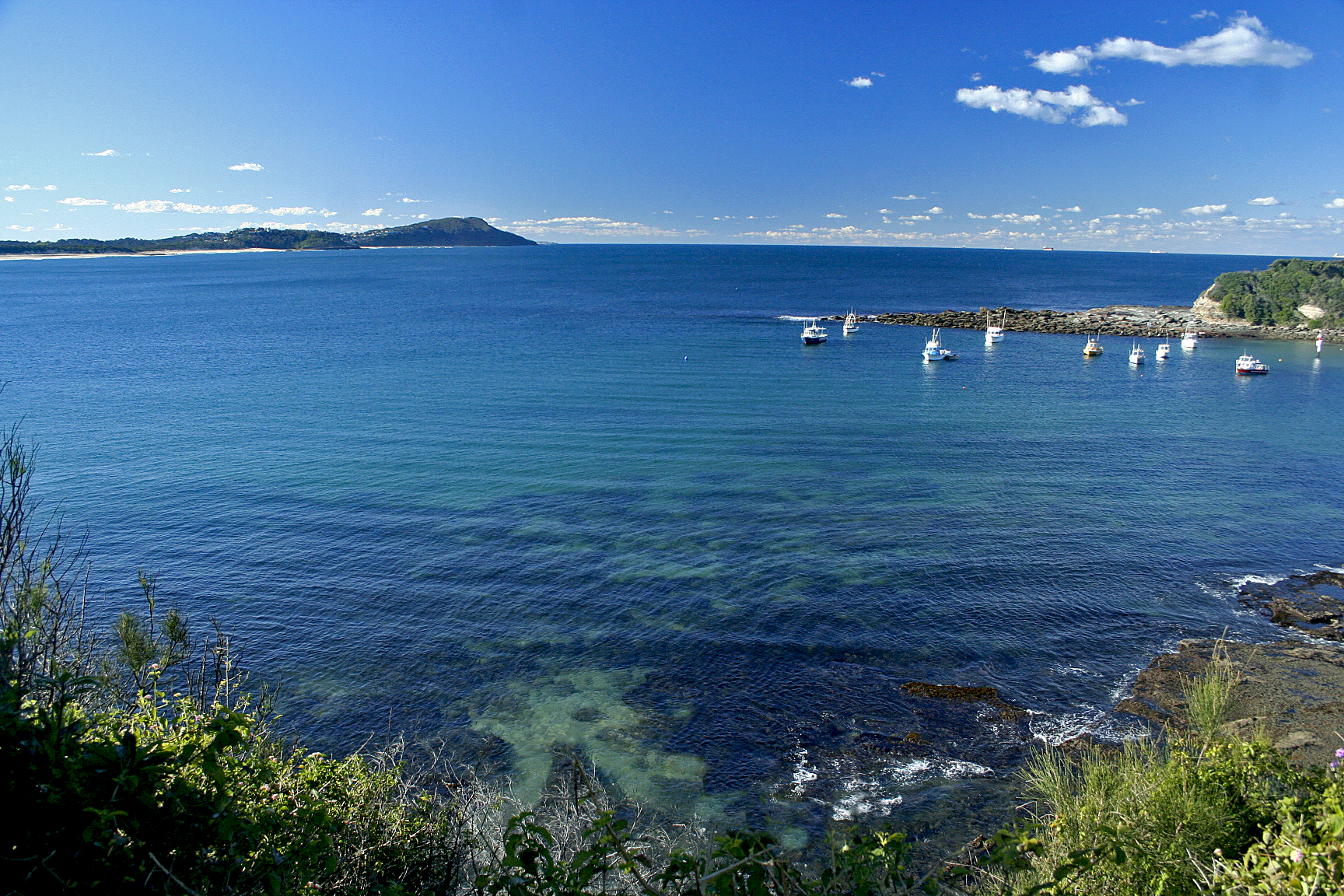
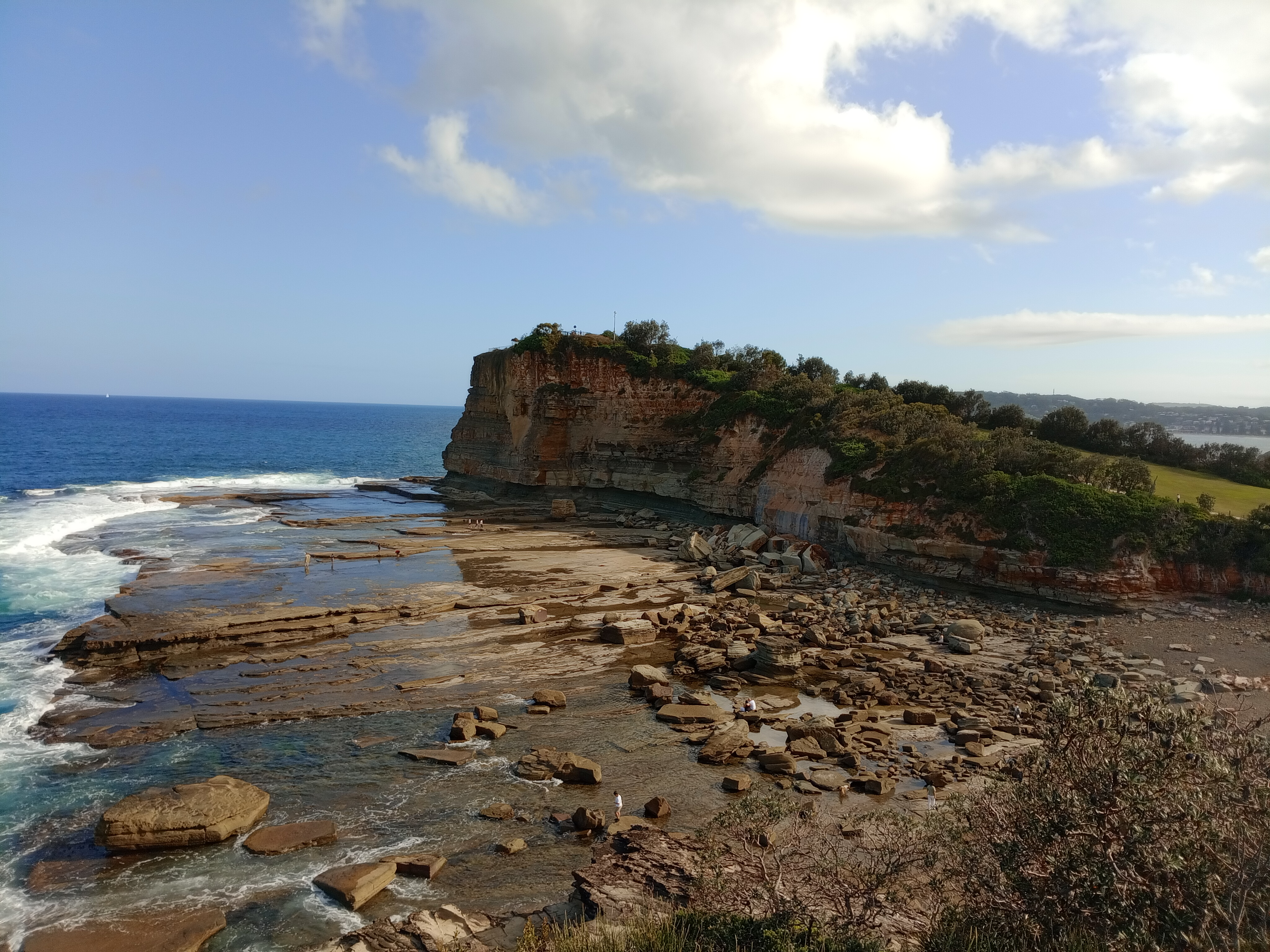
- Terrigal Beach and the town Terrigal Rugby Club Terrigal Haven The Skillion

- Coordinates: 33°26′53″S 151°26′40″E
- Country: Australia
- State: New South Wales
- City: Central Coast
- LGA: Central Coast Council
- Location: 88 km (55 mi) NNE of Sydney; 12 km (7.5 mi) E of Gosford; 15 km (9.3 mi) SSW of The Entrance

Government
  - State electorate: Terrigal
  - Federal divisions: Dobell; Robertson

Area
  - Total: 9.1 km^{2} (3.5 sq mi)
- Elevation: 9 m (30 ft)

Population
  - Total: 12,730 (SAL 2021)
- Postcode: 2260
- Parish: Kincumber
Localities around Terrigal
Erina Heights	Wamberal
Erina	Terrigal	Tasman Sea
Picketts Valley	Avoca Beach	North Avoca

Terrigal is a coastal town on the Central Coast of New South Wales, Australia, located 12 kilometres (7 mi) east of Gosford on the Pacific Ocean. It is part of the Central Coast Council local government area. At the 2021 census, the town had a population of 12,730.

== History ==
Terrigal was first settled in 1826 by European Settler John Gray, who called his property Tarrygal, after the Aboriginal place name, signifying 'place of little birds'. Early industry included Sawmilling and shipbuilding by Thomas Davis, who in 1886 constructed the General Gordon which was a notable steamship that operated on the Hawkesbury River at the Haven, which at the time was known as Broxmouth Ville Common.

== Geography and climate ==
The town's long beach is highly popular with tourists with a large Crowne Plaza hotel. Of geographical significance are the Terrigal lagoons. There are in fact two lagoons at Terrigal, one of which has been filled in to make way for a traffic oval. A local landmark is "The Skillion", a promontory which provides a view of all Terrigal. In recent years the Skillion has undergone rehabilitation by the local city council. Other popular attractions are the numerous nearby surf schools and trails.

The Haven – 2006

The Skillion is on a preserved area of land known as "The Haven". The Haven is centred by a popular public oval which is home of the "Terrigal Trojans", a Rugby Union club. Their new club house was provided by the former Gosford City Council. During the summer it is used by the Terrigal Matcham Cricket Club for both senior and junior fixtures. The Haven also has a popular boat ramp which is partnered by a diving club, and a small number of restaurants and cafes (due to tight development restrictions on the area).

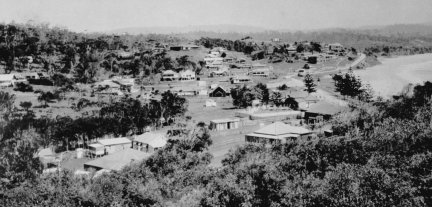
Terrigal in the 1920s

Central Coast Council has invested in Terrigal's CBD with a multi-level car park, esplanade walkway and stormwater drainage system. As a result of improved infrastructure and increased developer interest, Terrigal has become substantially more urban since the 1970s, when there was only one market, one medical centre and several orchards in the area.

Terrigal, as a popular beach-destination, is generally relatively mild to warm all year round, although can become somewhat cool during the winter months.

Climate data for Terrigal Beach
Month	Jan	Feb	Mar	Apr	May	Jun	Jul	Aug	Sep	Oct	Nov	Dec	Year
Mean daily maximum °C (°F)	26.1 (79.0)	26.0 (78.8)	25.1 (77.2)	22.9 (73.2)	20.3 (68.5)	18.0 (64.4)	17.3 (63.1)	18.8 (65.8)	21.0 (69.8)	22.7 (72.9)	23.8 (74.8)	24.9 (76.8)	22.2 (72.0)
Mean daily minimum °C (°F)	19.7 (67.5)	20.0 (68.0)	18.9 (66.0)	15.9 (60.6)	13.1 (55.6)	11.1 (52.0)	9.7 (49.5)	10.5 (50.9)	12.8 (55.0)	14.8 (58.6)	16.8 (62.2)	18.4 (65.1)	15.1 (59.3)

== Landmarks ==
Terrigal is home to a number of both natural and man-made landmarks. The Skillion is a sedimentary rock formation which was formed in the Triassic Period. Not only is the Skillion a beautiful artifact, the flip-side features an extremely steep hill which is used for exercise by locals and tourists.

Terrigal Lagoon, an intermittently closed intermediate saline coastal lagoon, is popular for kayaking and paddleboards.

The Terrigal Boardwalk was opened on the 14th April 2021, and was commissioned by the Central Coast Council and partially funded by the NSW Government, to much controversy. The boardwalk provides a link between the Terrigal Beach, the rockpools, boatramp, and The Skillion.

Terrigal Foreshore War Memorial was redeveloped in 2019 from the combination of two older war memorials, one that historically sat near the Surf Life Saving Club, and the other was the former Erina District War Memorial which was originally on the intersection of Terrigal Drive and The Entrance Road.

== Demographics ==
According to the 2021 census, there were 12,730 people in Terrigal.

- Aboriginal and Torres Strait Islander people made up 1.9% of the population.
- 74.4% of people were born in Australia. The next most common countries of birth were England 7.0%, New Zealand 1.9%, South Africa 1.5%, and the United States of America 0.7%.
- 87.6% of people spoke only English at home; the next most common languages spoken at home included Mandarin 0.7%, Spanish 0.5%, Italian 0.4%, Portuguese 0.4%, and Afrikaans 0.3%.
- The most common responses for religion were No Religion 39.4%, Catholic 23.6%, Anglican 15.1%, and Uniting Church 2.7%; a further 5.6% of respondents for this area elected not to disclose their religious status.

== Amenities ==
Just outside the CBD lie a number of amenities: a recently re-built hotel (2006), a primary school and high school (separate campuses), Catholic school, basketball stadium (used for training by Olympic athletes in the 2000 Sydney Olympics), and a large multi-purpose oval with three fields and year-round sporting activities. A skate park was opened in 2018.

In April 2011, HMAS Adelaide was scuttled off Terrigal as a dive wreck.

== Politics ==
At federal level, Terrigal is within the Division of Robertson. In the Federal election of May 2022 it was won by Gordon Reid of the Australian Labor Party, previously held for nine years by Lucy Wicks of the Liberal Party of Australia, as a result of the seat changing hands every time government changes this seat is known as a bellwether.

In the New South Wales Legislative Assembly, Terrigal is within the electorate of Terrigal, currently held by Adam Crouch of the Liberal Party.

== Transport ==
Terrigal's primary roads are Terrigal Drive and Scenic Highway (which form one continuous D-shaped road when combined with Terrigal Esplanade). At the east end of Terrigal Drive is the Central Coast Highway, which connects Terrigal to Doyalson, The Entrance, Gosford, Kariong, and the M1 Pacific Motorway.

Terrigal does not have a train station on the Central Coast & Newcastle Line, with the closest station (Gosford) located 12 km (7.5 mi) to the northwest. However, it is served by Busways routes 67 and 68, both of which go to Gosford Station.

In 2025, the Draft Central Coast Strategic Regional Integrated Transport Plan was released for public consultation, with submissions closing on 27th July. Four new 'core' bus route were proposed, with one running from Terrigal to Umina via Erina, Gosford, and Woy Woy – notably, the Erina to Gosford section of this route is the only place where two 'core' routes overlap, with this route sharing the corridor with The Entrance to Gosford via Karagi (Bateau Bay) and Erina. Two initiatives were proposed for Terrigal Drive, both to be led by Transport for NSW:

- 13 A (0–5 year timeframe) – Develop and commence implementation of a program of corridor upgrade improvements including bus priority for the proposed ‘core’ bus services, improvements to safety, traffic signals and performance, addressing freight considerations and improved conditions for walking and cycling
- 13 B (5–10 year timeframe) – Continue implementation of a corridor upgrade improvement program to support [the above improvements]

== Gallery ==
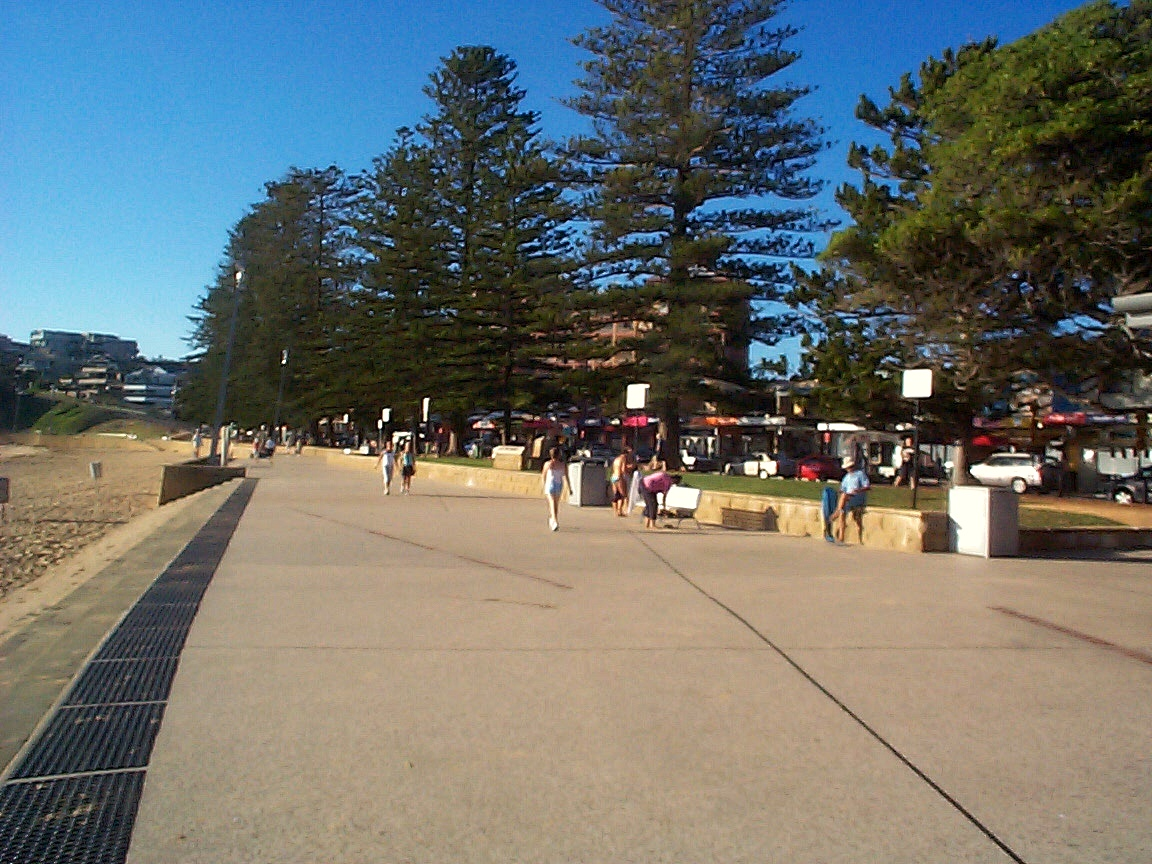
Beachfront

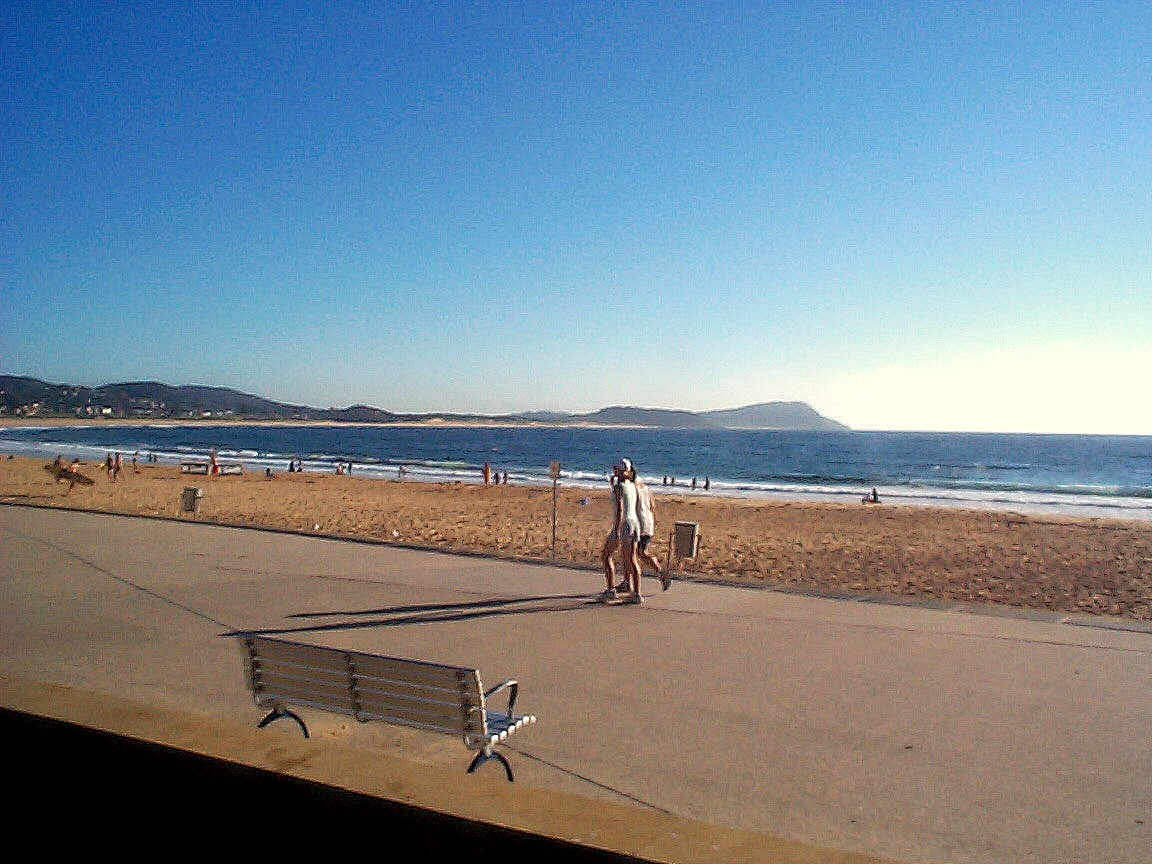
Morning beach

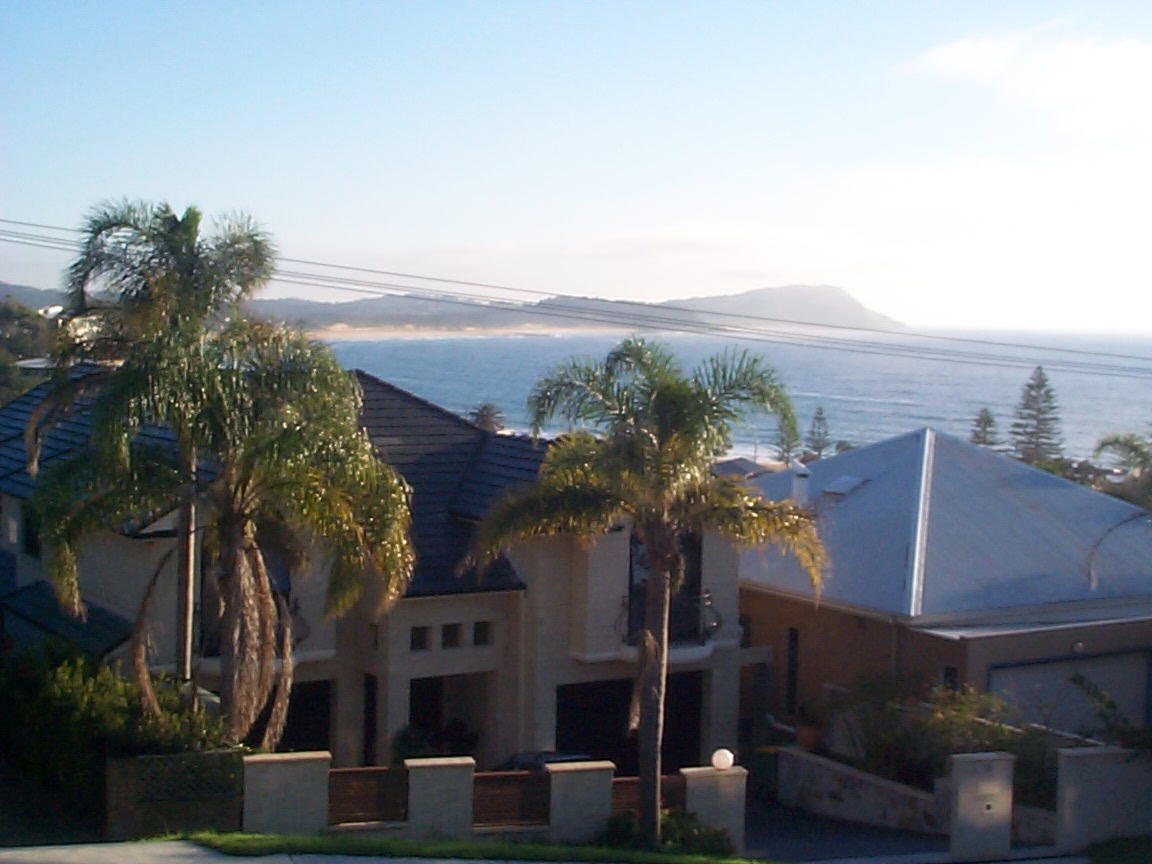
Residential development

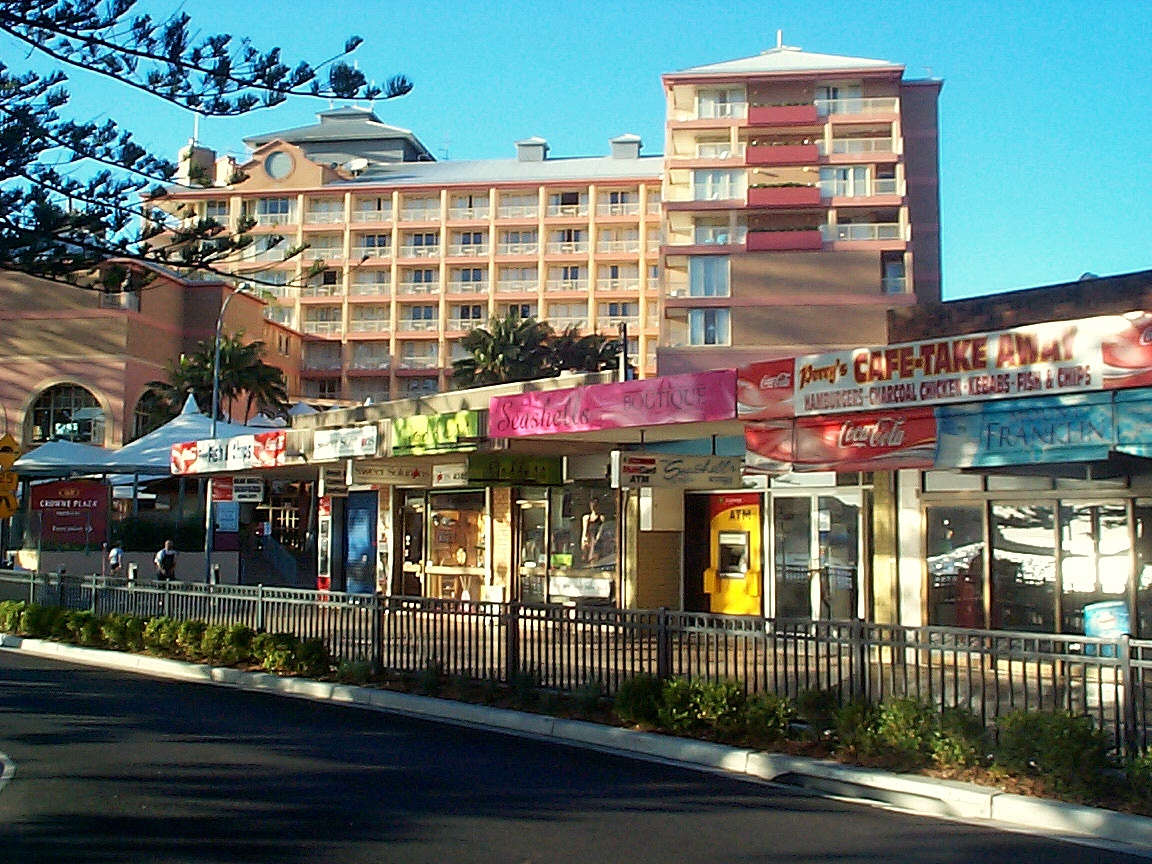
Local businesses
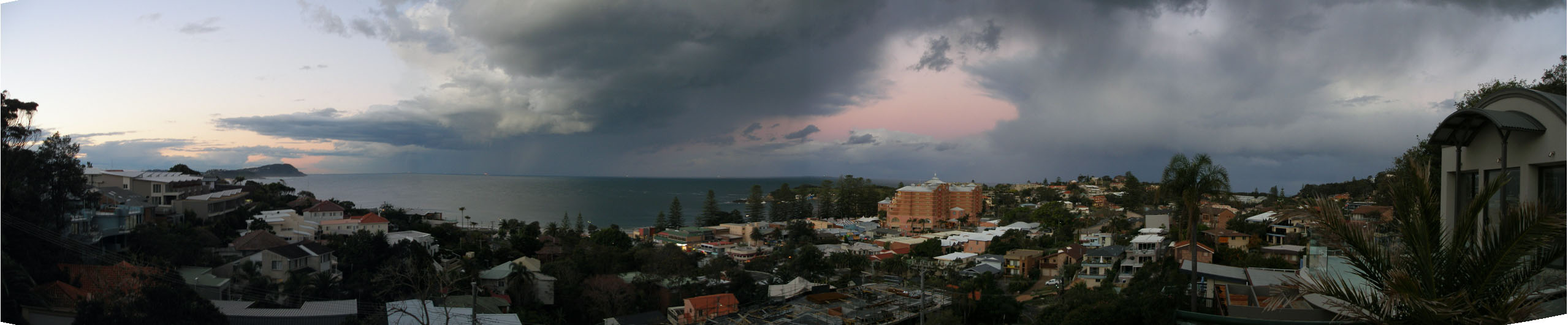
A panoramic view of Terrigal, with a storm out to sea, 2007
