= City of Gosford =

Former local government area in New South Wales, Australia

- Local government area
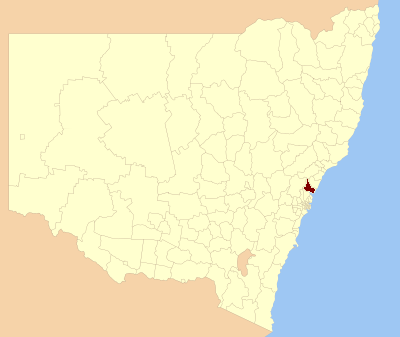
- Location in New South Wales

- Coordinates: 33°26′S 151°13′E
- Country: Australia
- State: New South Wales
- Region: Central Coast
- Established: 11 November 1886 (Borough); 24 October 1936 (Municipality); 1 January 1947 (Shire); 1 January 1980 (City)
- Abolished: 12 May 2016
- Council seat: Gosford Administration Building (1976–2016)

Government
  - Mayor: Lawrie McKinna
  - State electorates: Gosford; Terrigal; The Entrance
  - Federal divisions: Robertson; Dobell

Area
  - Total: 940 km^{2} (360 sq mi)

Population
  - Total: 162,440 (2011 census) (24th)
  - Density: 172.81/km^{2} (447.6/sq mi)
- Time zone: UTC+10 (AEST)
  - Summer (DST): UTC+11 (AEDT)
- Website: City of Gosford
LGAs around City of Gosford
Cessnock	Wyong	Tasman Sea
Hawkesbury	City of Gosford	Tasman Sea
Hornsby	Pittwater	Tasman Sea

The City of Gosford was a local government area that was located in the Central Coast region in the state of New South Wales, Australia. The incorporation of Gosford dates back to 1886 when the Town of Gosford was proclaimed as the Borough of Gosford, becoming the Municipality of Gosford from 1906. In 1908, the Gosford Municipality merged into Erina Shire which covered the remaining Central Coast area outside of Gosford, but regained its independence in 1936. From 1 January 1947, local government in the Central Coast region was reorganised, creating Gosford Shire and Wyong Shire, and the final boundaries of Gosford City Council date from this period. From 1 January 1980, Gosford Shire was granted city status, becoming the City of Gosford. On 12 May 2016 the Minister for Local Government amalgamated the City of Gosford and Wyong Shire Councils to form the new Central Coast Council.

Until its merger with the Wyong Shire in 2016, The City of Gosford covered an area of 940 square kilometres (360 sq mi). Its administrative seat was located in Gosford, approximately 77 kilometres (48 mi) north of Sydney and approximately 86 kilometres (53 mi) south of Newcastle. The city was bounded to the east by the Tasman Sea, to the south by Broken Bay and the Hawkesbury River, to the west by the Great North Road where it encircled the Dharug National Park taking in the catchment area of the Mangrove Creek Dam, before heading south–east towards the coast, north of Forresters Beach.

The last mayor of the Gosford City Council was Lawrie McKinna, an independent politician.

== Suburbs and localities ==
The local government area included a moderately densely populated coastal strip that extended northward from the Hawkesbury River, and an extensive sparsely populated region to the west that was largely native bush. The towns and villages located within the City of Gosford were:

- Avoca Beach
- Bar Point
- Bensville
- Blackwall
- Booker Bay
- Bouddi
- Box Head
- Calga
- Central Mangrove (with parts located within Wyong Shire)
- Cheero Point
- Cogra Bay
- Copacabana
- Daleys Point
- Davistown
- East Gosford
- Empire Bay
- Erina
- Erina Heights
- Ettalong Beach
- Forresters Beach
- Glenworth Valley
- Gosford
- Green Point
- Greengrove
- Gunderman
- Hardys Bay
- Holgate
- Horsfield Bay
- Kariong
- Killcare
- Killcare Heights
- Kincumber
- Kincumber South
- Koolewong
- Kulnura (with parts located within Wyong Shire)
- Lisarow
- Little Wobby
- Lower Mangrove
- MacMasters Beach
- Mangrove Creek
- Mangrove Mountain
- Marlow
- Matcham
- Mooney Mooney
- Mooney Mooney Creek
- Mount Elliot
- Mount White
- Narara
- Niagara Park
- North Avoca
- North Gosford
- Patonga
- Pearl Beach
- Peats Ridge
- Phegans Bay
- Picketts Valley
- Point Clare
- Point Frederick
- Pretty Beach
- St Huberts Island
- Saratoga
- Somersby
- Spencer
- Springfield
- Tascott
- Terrigal
- Umina
- Upper Mangrove
- Wagstaffe
- Wamberal
- Wendoree Park
- West Gosford
- Wisemans Ferry
- Wondabyne
- Woy Woy
- Woy Woy Bay
- Wyoming
- Yattalunga

== History ==
=== Early history ===
The traditional Aboriginal inhabitants of the lands now known as the Brisbane Water were the Guringai people of the Eora nation. The Darkingung people occupied large areas inland west towards Rylstone, and north to Cessnock and Wollombi.

In 1811, the Governor of New South Wales, Lachlan Macquarie, gave the first land grant in the region to William Nash, a former marine of the First Fleet. No further grants were made in the area until 1821. In 1839 governor Sir George Gipps named the town of Gosford after his friend, The Earl of Gosford. In 1840, the Brisbane Water Police District was proclaimed covering the area from the Hawkesbury River to Lake Macquarie and which administered local government under the control of magistrates. In 1843, the Brisbane Water District Council was proclaimed on the same boundaries as the Police District, and replaced the appointed magistrates with an elected council as part of an early attempt to establish local government administration throughout the colony. This experiment in local government was not very successful, with much public opposition focused on the issue of increased taxation, and a lack of oversight and faulty administration led to the collapse of many of these District Councils. The Brisbane Water District Council had ceased to exist by 1855, and the NSW Parliament passed the Municipalities Act in 1858, which allowed for the creation of Municipalities and Boroughs if a petition of as few as 50 signatures was presented to the government. However, no petition was ever sent from the residents of Brisbane Water to the government under this act, and local matters reverted to the police magistrates for determination.

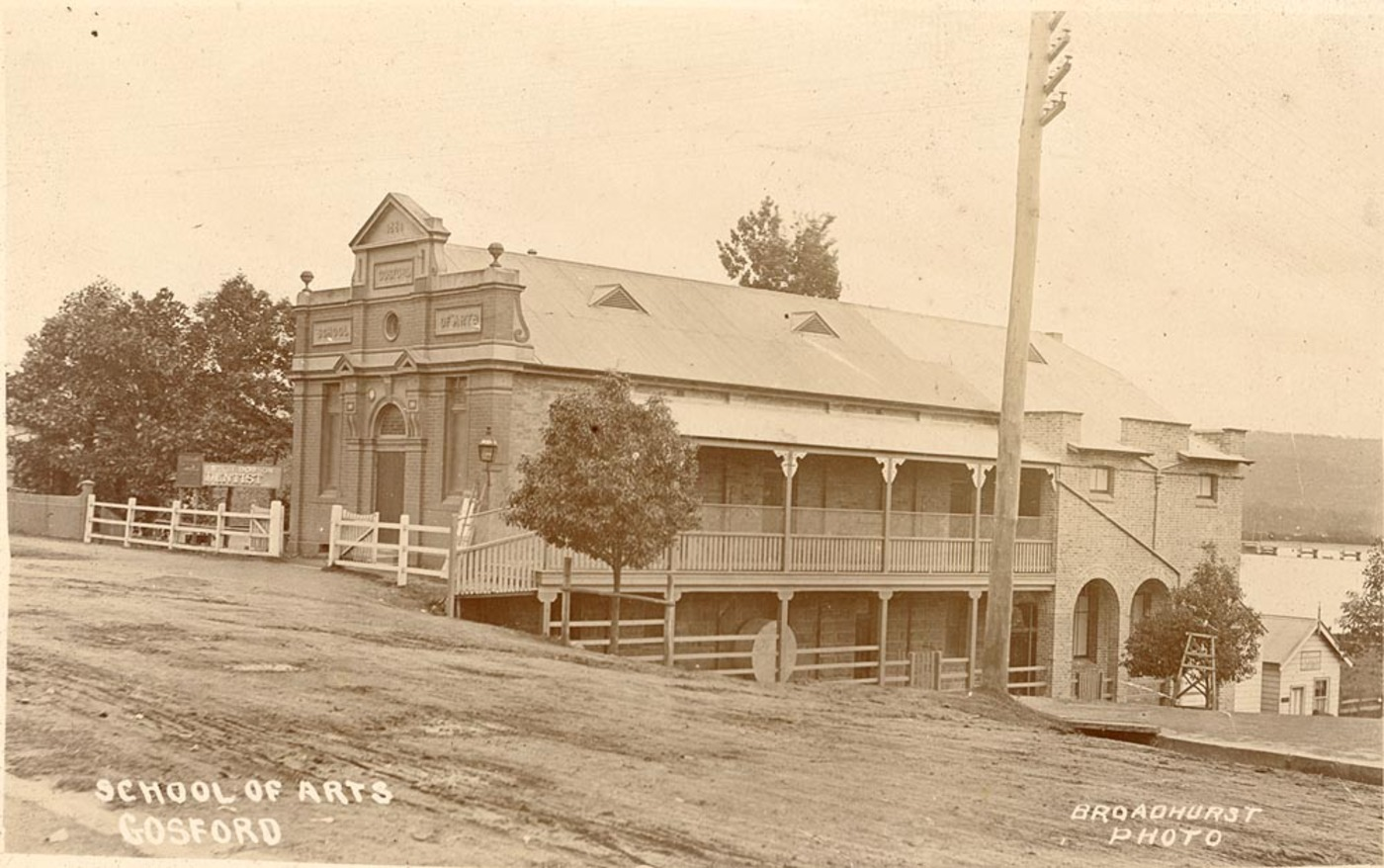
The School of Arts on the corner of Mann Street and Georgiana Terrace, Gosford, was the council seat of Gosford from 1886 to 1907, and Erina from 1907 to 1912. It was destroyed by fire and rebuilt in 1927 with only the sandstone base remaining.

=== Gosford Borough ===
Under the succeeding Municipalities Act, 1867, which allowed for residents to petition the Colonial Government for incorporation, a petition signed by 59 Gosford residents, amongst a population of approximately 1,000 at the time, was sent to the governor on 10 June 1886 requesting the establishment of the "Borough of Gosford" with two wards, East Gosford and West Gosford. The petition was subsequently accepted and on 11 November 1886, the "Borough of Gosford" was proclaimed by the governor Lord Carrington, with an area of 1,840 acres in and around the Town of Gosford. The first election for the six aldermen and two auditors was held at Gosford Courthouse on 1 February 1887, and the first mayor, John Bennett Whiteway, was elected at the first council meeting on 20 February 1887. From 1888, the borough council meetings were held in the Gosford School of Arts building at 38 Mann Street.

=== Erina Shire ===
The remaining area of the Brisbane Water Police District outside of Gosford continued to be administered by the police magistrates until 1906. From 7 March 1906, this area became the Erina Shire, when it was proclaimed by the NSW Government Gazette along with 132 other new Shires as a result of the passing of the Local Government (Shires) Act 1905. On 16 May 1906, the Shire was divided in to three Ridings (A, B, C) and five temporary councillors were appointed (John Bourke of Kincumber, John Martin Moroney of Woy Woy, Harold Stanley Robinson of Penang, Manasseh Ward of Gosford, and Alexander Wilkinson of Wyong). The Temporary Council first met at Gosford Courthouse on 13 June 1906 and Manasseh Ward was elected as the chairman. The first election was held on 24 November 1906 and the first meeting of the elected nine-member council was held at the Gosford Courthouse on 5 December 1906, with councillor Ward elected to continue serving as the first shire president.

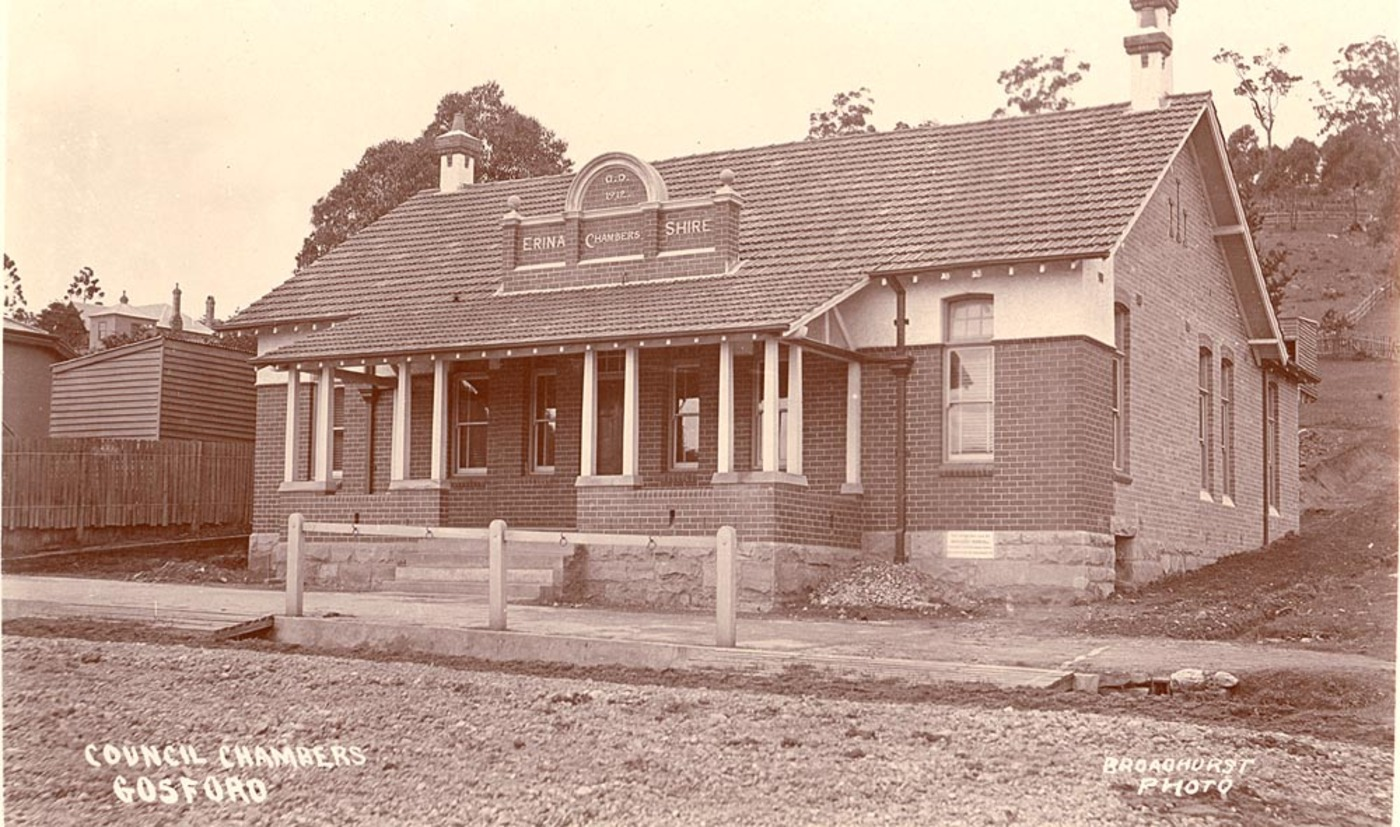
Erina Shire Chambers in Gosford, built 1912.

With the coming into effect of the Local Government Act, 1906, the Borough of Gosford became the Municipality of Gosford, as well as the power of Councils to petition the government to dissolve and merge with other Councils. In July 1907 a petition from the Municipality of Gosford was published in the Government Gazette requesting to merge with Erina Shire, the first Council to do so under the 1906 act. However, owing to objections from the Wyong Progress Association and the Erina Shire Council, a public inquiry was established by the secretary for public works, where it was heard that the Gosford Municipality was in debt and desired to merge with Erina to resolve its financial issues. Despite objections, the commissioner returned a recommendation for the merger and a proposal for a six-ward model was considered and accepted at a conference held on 30 September 1907. The proposal for a six-ward Erina Shire with Gosford becoming F Riding was subsequently proclaimed and came into effect on 23 January 1908. The new Shire Council Chambers on Mann Street, Gosford, were officially opened on 4 May 1912.

In 1921, a group of ratepayers angered by what they saw as a general neglect of their local area, formed an organisation to work towards the separation of the Woy Woy Peninsula area from Erina Shire. On 27 April 1928 a proposal for separation was received and the Shire of Woy Woy was subsequently proclaimed on 1 August 1928.

=== Gosford Municipality and Brisbane Water County Council ===
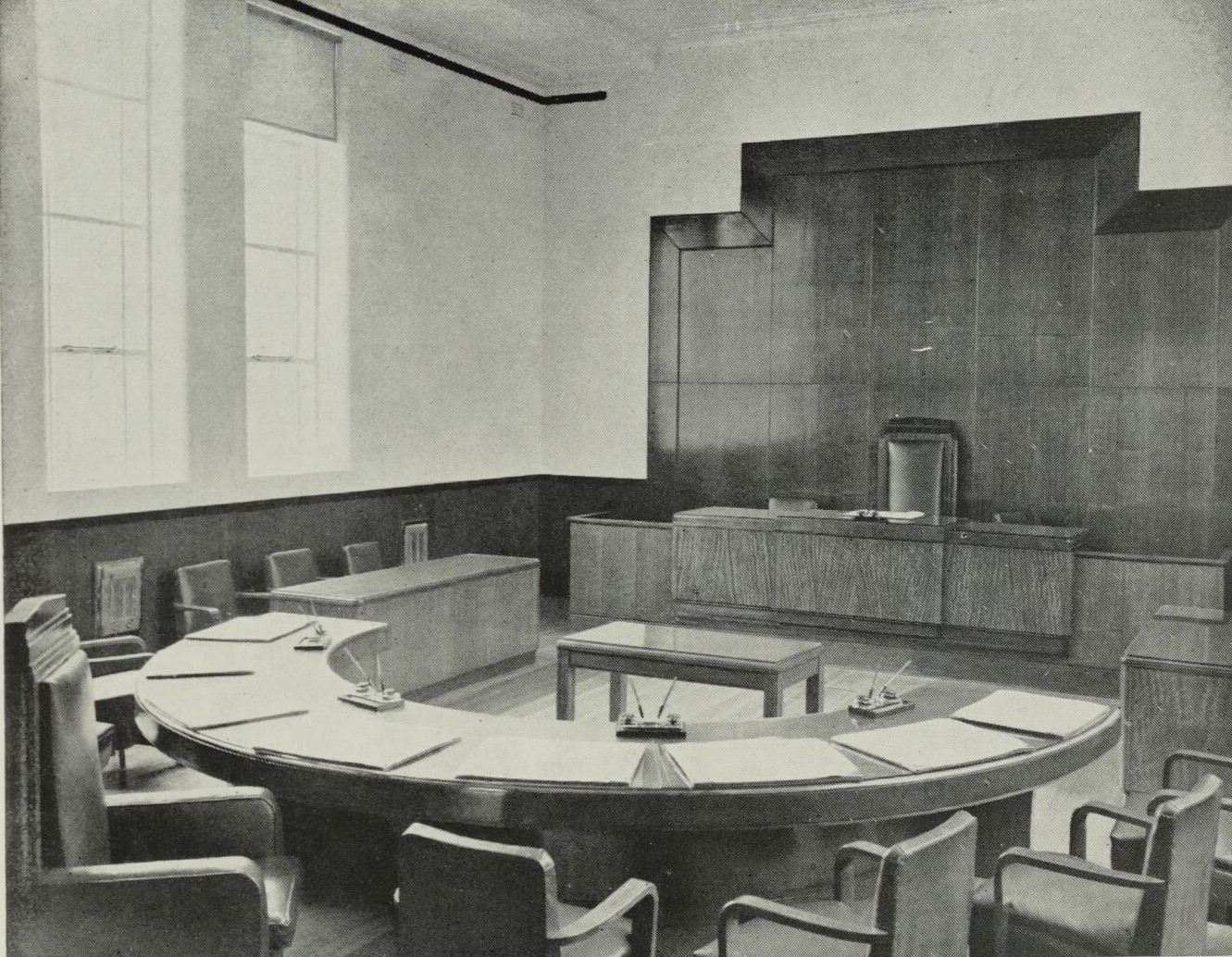
The meeting chamber of Gosford Council Chambers on Mann Street, completed in 1939.

In March 1936, three councillors of Erina Shire were dismissed from office for having held office while subject to a special disqualification, and it was also revealed that council staff had not been paid since February. As the council could not meet due to lack of quorum, on 24 March 1936 the Minister for Local Government, Eric Spooner, dismissed the council and appointed an administrator, B. C. Hughes. Spooner commissioned Hughes to undertake an inquiry into the administration of Erina Shire and, following a January petition from Gosford and Point Clare residents for a new Gosford municipality, also to investigate the question of the separation of Gosford from the Shire. The inquiry found in favour of a separation of Gosford, which was accepted by Spooner, and Erina Shire was divided again to re-form the Municipality of Gosford on 24 October 1936, including the areas of the former Gosford Municipality abolished in 1908 and also new areas from Narara to Woy Woy and Point Clare. A nine-member provisional council was appointed the same day, and at the first meeting on 24 October 1936 William Calman Grahame was elected as the first mayor and Charles Staples, the former mayor of Woy Woy, was elected deputy mayor. Following the first council election on 23 January 1937, Grahame and Staples were re-elected to their positions on 29 January.

In March 1938, the first permanent supply of town water was delivered to Gosford, with the opening of a new water supply direct from Lower Mooney Dam on the Mooney Mooney Creek. On 22 April 1939, the Gosford Council Chambers on Mann Street, designed in the Inter-war Art Deco style by architects Loyal Figgis and Virgil Cizzio and built by A. E. Catterall at a cost of £5,785, was officially opened by the Minister for Local Government, Eric Spooner.

Following significant debate about the provision of electricity undertakings across the Central Coast, including over the split between Erina Shire and Gosford, on 16 October 1942 Gosford Municipality combined with the Shires of Erina and Woy Woy to form the Brisbane Water County Council to provide electricity to the combined area of the three councils. The county council operated as an electricity and gas supplier and retailer and was managed by representatives of the three councils. The county council operated until its amalgamation with the Sydney County Council from 1 January 1980.

=== Gosford and Wyong ===
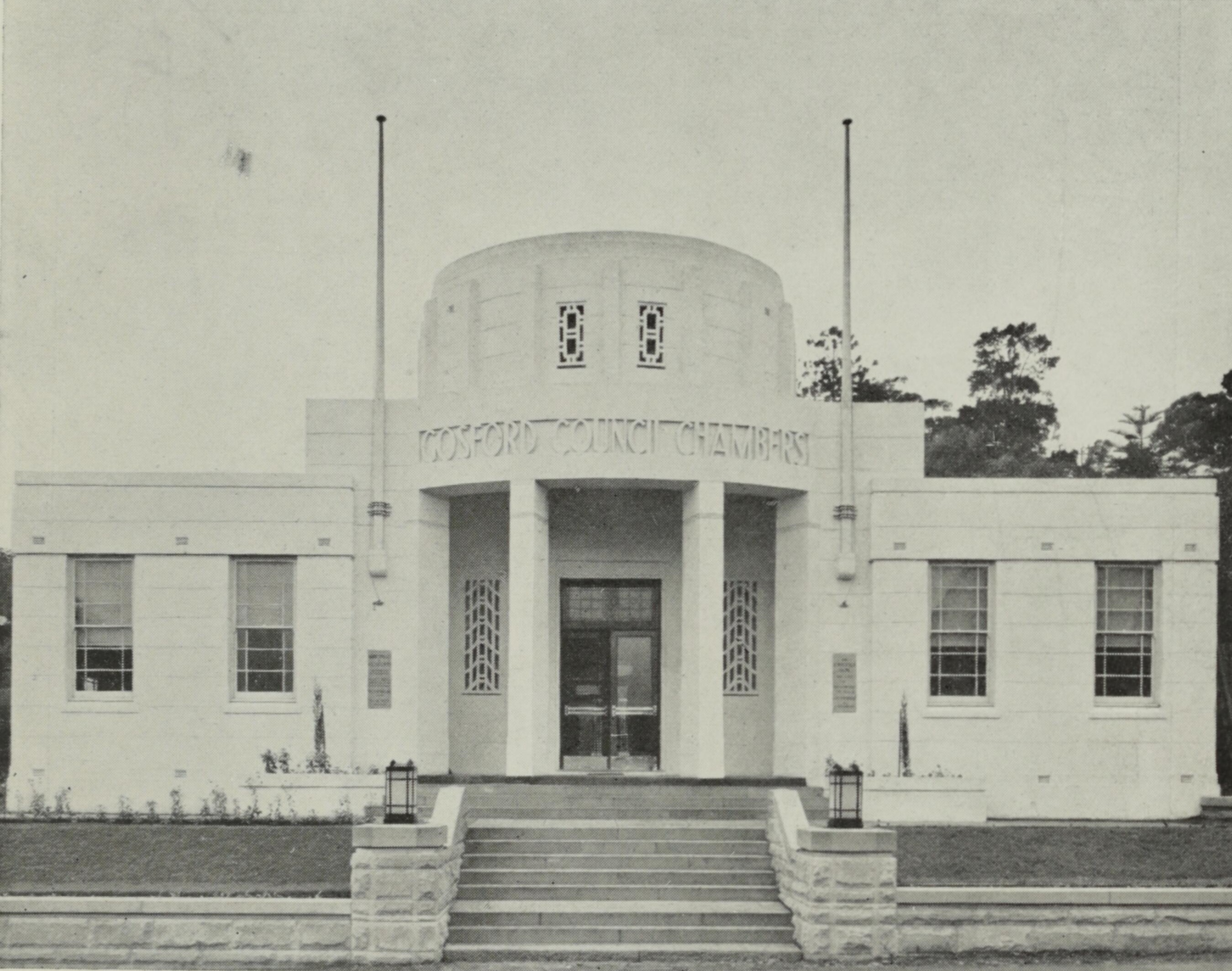
Gosford Council Chambers on Mann Street, completed in 1939 was the council seat until 1974, when it was demolished for the present Gosford Administration Building.

In June 1945, Erina Shire resolved to investigate the reconstitution of local government on the Central Coast into two shires and following further discussions a formal proposal was presented to the Minister for Local Government, Joseph Cahill, in October 1945. Nevertheless, the proposal proved divisive, with Gosford and the Wyong section of Erina Shire in favour and the rest of Erina Shire and Woy Woy Shire opposed. The formal government inquiry subsequently supported the proposal and in April 1946, Cahill notified the councils of his intention to proceed. On 1 January 1947, part of Erina Shire, all of Woy Woy Shire and the Municipality of Gosford formed Gosford Shire, and the remainder of Erina Shire north and east of Kulnura, Central Mangrove and Lisarow formed Wyong Shire.

In August 1948, Gosford Shire established the first Library Service, with branches opening on 13 August at Woy Woy (in the old Council Chambers) and on 16 August on Mann Street next to the Council Chambers. An expanded Gosford Branch Library was opened in 1951 by the Minister for Education, Bob Heffron. New Libraries were subsequently opened at Gosford (Donnison St, 1969), Umina (1983), Kariong (2002) and at Kincumber, Wyoming and Erina (2003).

On 23 February 1961, Gosford Shire Council resolved to suspend the shire clerk, Nigel George Howes, noting dissatisfaction with his work and that they no longer had confidence in him. However, Howes later gained an Equity Court ruling that placed a suspension on council's dismissal of him until a public inquiry could be held to investigate the Council resolution. Awaiting the results of the inquiry, Howes returned to work in March and was suspended again on 6 June 1961, with the council then airing various allegations in the inquiry against him. On 5 August 1961, the council was brought into disrepute again when Councillor Donald Norman Lamont was convicted on 11 counts (fined £450) for three breaches of the Local Government Act 1919, including voting and participating in debate on several developments in which he had a significant undeclared financial interest. As a result of these events, the Minister for Local Government, Pat Hills, announced that due to the failure of council to resolve these matters and the loss of public confidence in the council, he would dismiss the council and appoint an administrator. Subsequently, on 20 September 1961 Hills dismissed the council and appointed the Chief Inspector of Local Government Accounts, Henry William Dane, as administrator. On the dismissal, Councillor Dangar laid the blame for the dysfunction at the feet of the acting shire president, Jack Roberts: "As soon as Councillor Barrett [the shire president] became ill, you made no effort to work with Mr Howes and you had him sacked within two weeks." The inquiry was concluded in October 1961, with Special Magistrate E. R. Harvey finding that there was "no justification" for Council's actions to suspend the shire clerk. Not long after, Dane reinstated Howes to duty as shire clerk, and the council would remain under administration until December 1965.

In 1974–1976, the 1939 Gosford Council Council Chambers were demolished and replaced by the Gosford Administration Building, a Brutalist style tower with a pre-cast concrete facade designed by prominent architects, McConnell Smith & Johnston. On 9 November 1979, the Shire of Gosford was proclaimed as the City of Gosford, with effect from 1 January 1980.

In January 1997, the mayor of Gosford, Tony Sansom, was briefly threatened with dismissal from office when a Magistrate ordered that he be removed from office as a result of litigation that alleged irregularities in moving the dates of the September 1996 mayoral election. However, Sansom, who described the magistrate's ruling as "bizarre" appealed the decision to the Supreme Court. On 4 July 1997, the Supreme Court overturned the magistrate's ruling, with Justice Michael Grove noting that the ruling was an "error of law".

=== Establishment of Central Coast Council and abolition of Gosford City Council ===
In 2015 a review of local government boundaries by the NSW Government Independent Pricing and Regulatory Tribunal recommended that Wyong Shire and Gosford City councils merge to form one single council with an area of 1,681 square kilometres (649 sq mi) and support a population of approximately 331,007. On 12 May 2016, with the release of the Local Government (Council Amalgamations) Proclamation 2016, Central Coast Council was formed from Wyong Shire and Gosford City councils. The first meeting of the Central Coast Council was held at the Wyong Civic Centre on 25 May 2016, with meetings alternating between Gosford and Wyong.

== Demographics ==
At the 2011 Census, there were 162,440 people in Gosford local government area, making the area the twelfth most populous local government area in New South Wales, and the twenty–fourth most populous local government area in Australia. Of these 48.2% were male and 51.8% were female. Aboriginal and Torres Strait Islander people made up 2.2% of the population. The median age of people in the City of Gosford was 42 years; significantly higher than the national median of 37 years. Children aged 0 – 14 years made up 18.7% of the population and people aged 65 years and over made up 19.2% of the population, compared to 14.0% being the national median of people aged over 65 years. Of people in the area aged 15 years and over, 48.6% were married and 13.8% were either divorced or separated. With a higher proportion of elderly residents than the national median, the data reflects the colloquial term for the area as God's Waiting Room.

Population growth in the City of Gosford between the 2001 Census and the 2006 Census was 2.67%; and in the subsequent five years to the 2011 Census, population growth was 2.71%. When compared with total population growth of Australia for the same periods, being 5.78% and 8.32% respectively, population growth in the Gosford local government area was nearly one third below the national average. The median weekly income for residents within the City of Gosford was approximately 10% lower than the national average.

At the 2011 Census, the proportion of residents in the Gosford local government area who stated their ancestry as Australian or Anglo-Saxon exceeded 78% of all residents. In excess of 60% of all residents in the City of Gosford nominated a religious affiliation with Christianity at the 2011 Census, which was significantly higher than the national average of 50.2%. Meanwhile, as at the Census date, compared to the national average, households in the Gosford local government area had a lower than average proportion (7.5%) where two or more languages are spoken (national average was 20.4%); and a higher proportion (89.9%) where English only was spoken at home (national average was 76.8%).

Selected historical census data for the City of Gosford local government area
Census year		1991	1996	2001	2006	2011
Population	Estimated residents on Census night	128,781	144,840	154,045	158,157	162,440
Population	LGA rank in terms of size within New South Wales				9th	12th
Population	% of New South Wales population	2.25%	▲2.40%	▲2.42%		2.35%
Population	% of Australian population	0.76%	▲0.81%	▲0.82%	▼0.80%	▼0.76%
Cultural and language diversity						
Ancestry, top responses	English					31.5%
Ancestry, top responses	Australian					30.4%
Ancestry, top responses	Irish					9.2%
Ancestry, top responses	Scottish					7.5%
Ancestry, top responses	German					2.3%
Language, top responses (other than English)	Spanish			0.2%	▲0.3%	▲0.4%
Language, top responses (other than English)	Italian			0.4%	▼0.3%	▲0.4%
Language, top responses (other than English)	German			0.3%	0.3%	▲0.4%
Language, top responses (other than English)	Cantonese			0.2%	0.2%	▲0.3%
Language, top responses (other than English)	Mandarin			n/c	n/c	▲0.3%
Religious affiliation						
Religious affiliation, top responses	Anglican			31.2%	▼28.5%	▼26.7%
Religious affiliation, top responses	Catholic			26.3%	▼25.6%	25.6%
Religious affiliation, top responses	No Religion			12.3%	▲15.4%	▲19.8%
Religious affiliation, top responses	Uniting Church			6.0%	▼5.2%	▼4.4%
Religious affiliation, top responses	Presbyterian and Reformed			4.1%	▼3.5%	▼3.2%
Median weekly incomes						
Personal income	Median weekly personal income				A$438	A$534
Personal income	% of Australian median income				94.0%	92.5%
Family income	Median weekly family income				A$944	A$1,395
Family income	% of Australian median income				91.9%	94.2%
Household income	Median weekly household income				A$1,147	A$1,089
Household income	% of Australian median income				98.0%	88.2%

== Council ==
=== Final composition and election method ===
Gosford City Council was composed of ten councillors elected proportionally as one entire ward. All councillors were elected for a fixed four-year term of office. The last election was held on 8 September 2012, and the makeup of the council was as follows: The mayor and deputy mayor were elected annually by the councillors at a special meeting of the council in September. The final Council, elected in 2012 and abolished in 2016, in order of election, were:

Councillor	Party	Notes
Jeff Strickson	Liberal	Elected 2008–2016.
Jim Macfadyen	Labor	Elected 2004–2016. Mayor 2007–2008. Deputy mayor 2014–2015.
Lawrie McKinna	Independent	Elected 2012–2016. Mayor 2012–2016.
Hillary Morris	Greens	Elected 2012–2016.
Bob Ward	Liberal	Elected 2008–2016. Deputy mayor 2012–2014.
Vicki Scott	Labor	Elected 2004–2016.
Gabby Bowles	Independent	Elected 2012–2016 on McKinna's ticket.
Chris Burke	Liberal	Elected 2008–2016.
Craig Doyle	Independent	Elected 1999–2016. Deputy mayor 2003–2007, 2008–2012, 2015–2016.
Deanna Bocking	Liberal	Elected 2012–2016.

== Mayors and Shire Presidents ==
=== Mayors 1886–1908 ===
#	Mayor	Term start	Term end	Time in office	Notes
1	John Bennett Whiteway	20 February 1887	18 February 1888	363 days	
2	Henry Charles Wheeler	18 February 1888	14 February 1889	362 days	
3	George Watt	14 February 1889	2 August 1889	169 days	
4	Manasseh Ward	2 August 1889	14 February 1890	196 days	
–	Henry Charles Wheeler	14 February 1890	16 February 1893	3 years, 2 days	
4	John James Mullard	16 February 1893	21 March 1895	2 years, 33 days	
–	Henry Charles Wheeler	21 March 1895	5 February 1896	321 days	
5	Charles Cain	5 February 1896	17 September 1896	225 days	
–	Manasseh Ward	17 September 1896	10 February 1899	2 years, 146 days	
7	Jeremiah James Mason	10 February 1899	21 February 1901	2 years, 11 days	
–	Manasseh Ward	21 February 1901	10 July 1903	2 years, 139 days	
–	Jeremiah James Mason	10 July 1903	3 February 1904	208 days	
8	James Kibble	3 February 1904	23 January 1908	3 years, 354 days	

=== Mayors 1936–1947 ===
#	Mayor	Term start	Term end	Time in office	Notes
1	William Calman Grahame	24 October 1936	4 December 1940	4 years, 41 days	
2	Ralph Randall Mortimer	4 December 1940	4 December 1940	0 days	
3	John Cunningham Speers	23 December 1940	11 January 1943	2 years, 19 days	
4	Clarence James Lloyd	11 January 1943	December 1943	324 days	
–	John Cunningham Speers	December 1943	1 January 1947	3 years, 31 days	

=== Shire Presidents 1947–1980, and Mayors 1980–2016 ===
#	Shire president	Term start	Term end	Time in office	Notes
1	John Cunningham Speers	January 1947	18 July 1947	198 days	
2	William Baldwin	18 July 1947	6 December 1947	141 days	
3	J. H. Parks	10 December 1947	7 December 1948	363 days	
4	William Benjamin Grahame	7 December 1948	19 December 1949	12 days	
5	George Downes	19 December 1949	5 December 1950	1 year, 351 days	
–	William Benjamin Grahame	5 December 1950	6 December 1951	1 year, 1 day	
6	William David Tarrant	6 December 1951	1 December 1952	361 days	
–	William Benjamin Grahame	1 December 1952	8 December 1953	1 year, 7 days	
7	James Arthur Brown	8 December 1953	1956		
8	John Leslie Chambers	1956	December 1956		
–	James Arthur Brown	December 1956	December 1957		
9	Charles Thomas Barrett	December 1957	1961		
–	Jack Roberts (Acting)	1961	20 September 1961		
–	Henry William Dane (Administrator)	20 September 1961	4 December 1965	4 years, 75 days	
10	R. M. Vaughan	December 1965	December 1967		
11	William J. Bullion	December 1967	December 1968		
12	L. J. McCarthy	December 1968	December 1969		
–	William J. Bullion	December 1969	1971		
–	Reginald James Tarbox (Acting)	1971	September 1971		
13	Robert Lionel Hyndman	September 1971	September 1972		
14	J. W. Laurenson	September 1972	September 1973		
15	Malcolm Brooks	September 1973	September 1977		
16	Donald Ernest Leggett	September 1977	1 January 1980		
#	Mayor	Term start	Term end	Time in office	Notes
–	Donald Ernest Leggett	1 January 1980	September 1982		
17	Barrie N. Horne	September 1982	September 1983		
18	Peter Coleman	September 1983	September 1985		
19	Robert Bell	September 1985	September 1986		
20	Dr Patricia Harrison	September 1986	September 1989		
21	Kim Margin	September 1989	September 1990		
–	Dr Patricia Harrison	September 1990	September 1991		
–	Robert Bell	September 1991	September 1993		
22	Dirk O'Connor	September 1993	September 1994		
23	Tony Sansom	September 1994	September 1998		
24	Chris Holstein	September 1998	September 2001		
–	Robert Bell	September 2001	19 April 2004		
–	Malcolm Brooks	19 April 2004	30 September 2005	1 year, 164 days	
25	Laurie Maher	30 September 2005	24 September 2007	1 year, 359 days	
26	Jim Macfadyen	24 September 2007	30 September 2008	1 year, 6 days	
–	Chris Holstein	30 September 2008	28 September 2010	1 year, 363 days	
–	Laurie Maher	28 September 2010	8 September 2012	1 year, 346 days	
27	Lawrie McKinna	24 September 2012	12 May 2016	3 years, 231 days	

== Council executives ==
Town clerk	Term	Notes
Robert John White	7 March 1887 – 30 January 1888	
William Hastings	30 January 1888 – 4 February 1903	
Richard Blaxland Hays	4 February 1903 – 14 September 1905	
William Hastings	14 September 1905 – 23 January 1908	
Town clerk	Term	Notes
Nigel George Howes	2 November 1936 – 31 December 1946	
Shire clerk	Term	Notes
Nigel George Howes	1 January 1947 – 1966	
Benjamin G. Pratt	1966 – 1980	
Town clerk	Term	Notes
Benjamin G. Pratt	1 January 1980 – 1982	
W. H. Grant	1983 – 1988	
City Manager	Term	Notes
Neville Prince	1988 – 1 February 1991	
Keith Dedden	1 February 1991 – 30 June 1993	
General Manager	Term	Notes
Keith Dedden	1 July 1993 – 1995	
Peter Wilson	1995 – 1 June 2012	
Stephen Glenn (Acting)	1 June 2012 – 31 December 2012	
Chief Executive Officer	Term	Notes
Paul Anderson	1 January 2013 – 12 May 2016	

== Coat of arms ==
Coat of arms of City of Gosford
Arms of the Earl of Gosford	Adopted 1966 Crest A Cock Gules, standing upon a Trumpet Or. Helm An Earl's Coronet. Escutcheon Argent, a Double-Headed Eagle displayed Sable, beaked and membered Or, on a Chief Vert, two Mullets Or. Supporters Dexter: A Leopard proper, collared and chained Or; Sinister: A Leopard reguardant proper, collared and chained Or. Motto GOSFORD CITY COUNCIL Symbolism In 1952, the Brisbane Water Historical Society received the approval of the 5th Earl of Gosford via his son Viscount Acheson for a proposal to adopt a version of the Earl of Gosford's coat of arms for the use of Gosford Shire Council. However it wasn't until 1966 when Gosford Shire Council formally adopted the Gosford arms for use by Council. In a modification from the Gosford Arms, the original motto "Vigilantibus" (To be watchful) was replaced by the Council title ("Gosford Shire Council"), with the only change since to replace "Shire" with "City" when the name changed in 1980.
