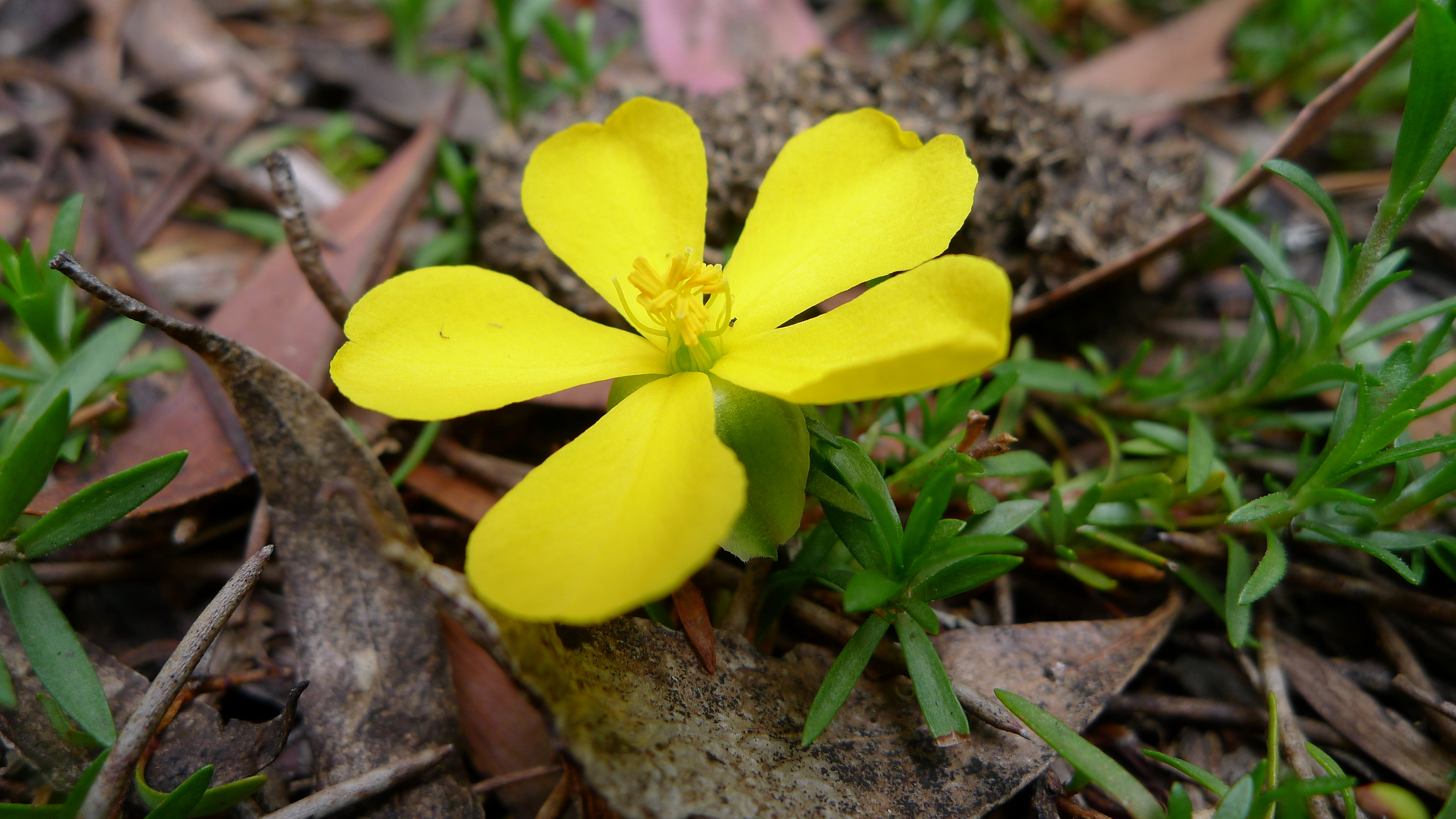
- Hibbertia procumbens near Lake St. Clair

Scientific classification
- Kingdom: Plantae
- Clade: Tracheophytes
- Clade: Angiosperms
- Clade: Eudicots
- Order: Dilleniales
- Family: Dilleniaceae
- Genus: Hibbertia
- Species: H. procumbens

Binomial name
- Hibbertia procumbens (Labill.)DC.

Synonyms
- Candollea enervia (DC.) Druce; Dillenia procumbens Labill.; Hibbertia angustifolia Salisb. nom. illeg.; Hibbertia enervia (DC.) Hoogland p.p.; Hibbertia procumbens var. pilosa Hook.f.; Hibbertia procumbens (Labill.) DC. var. procumbens; Pleurandra enervia DC.

= Hibbertia procumbens =

Spreading guinea flower

Species of flowering plant

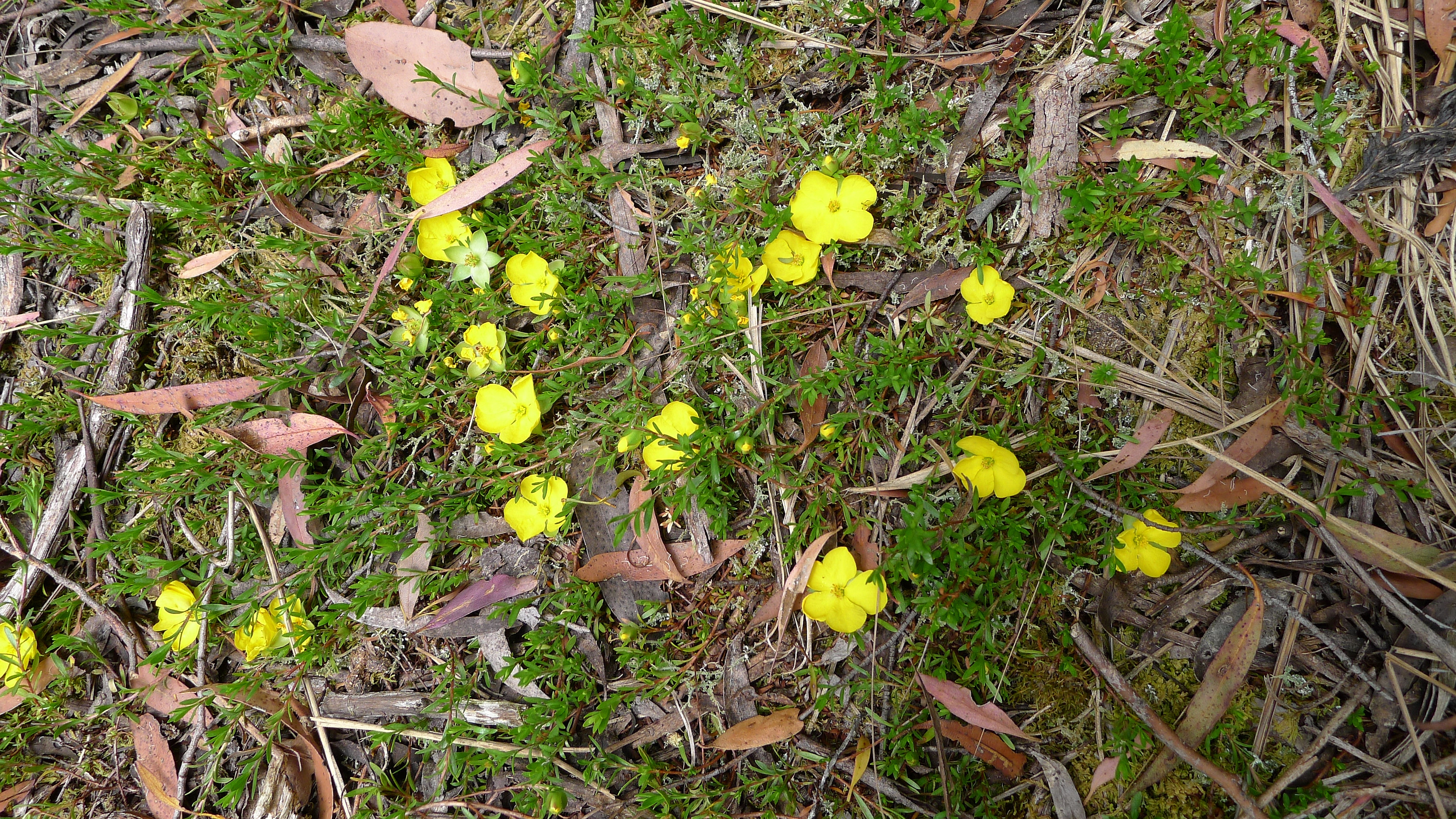
Habit

Hibbertia procumbens, commonly known as spreading guinea flower, is a species of flowering plant in the family Dilleniaceae and is endemic to south-eastern Australia. It is a prostrate, often mat-forming shrub with more or less glabrous stems, linear to narrow lance-shaped leaves with the narrower end towards the base, and yellow flowers with eighteen to twenty-five stamens arranged in groups around usually four glabrous carpels.

== Description ==
Hibbertia obtusifolia is a prostrate, often mat-forming shrub with more or less glabrous branches up to 30 cm (12 in) long. The leaves are linear to lance-shaped with the narrower end towards the base, 3–19 mm (0.12–0.75 in) long and 0.4–2.1 mm (0.016–0.083 in) wide with a rounded end and usually a groove along the upper surface. The flowers are arranged on the ends of branches and are sessile, surrounded by a cluster of up to six leaves. The sepals are 5.3–10.5 mm (0.21–0.41 in) long and of unequal lengths. The petals are bright yellow, egg-shaped with the narrower end towards the base, and 4.0–15 mm (0.16–0.59 in) long. There are eighteen to twenty-five stamens arranged in groups around usually four glabrous carpels. Flowering occurs from October to December.

== Taxonomy ==
Spreading guinea flower was first formally described in 1806 by Jacques Labillardière who gave it the name Dillenia procumbens in Novae Hollandiae Plantarum Specimen. In 1817, Augustin Pyramus de Candolle changed the name to Hibbertia procumbens in Regni Vegetabilis Systema Naturale. The specific epithet (procumbens) means "low-lying".

== Distribution and habitat ==
Spreading guinea flower occurs in New South Wales, Victoria and Tasmania, growing in sandy soil, usually in heath. It is widespread and common in Tasmania, found in near-coastal areas of southern Victoria, but rare in New South Wales where it only occurs on the Central Coast near Somersby, Kulnura and Mangrove Mountain.

== Conservation status ==
Hibbertia procumbens is listed as "endangered" under the New South Wales Government Biodiversity Conservation Act 2016.
