= Greengrove =

- Suburb
- Interactive map of Greengrove
- Coordinates: 33°22′45″S 151°09′25″E
- Country: Australia
- State: New South Wales
- City: Central Coast
- LGA: Central Coast Council
- Location: 41 km (25 mi) W of Gosford; 102 km (63 mi) N of Sydney

Government
  - State electorate: Gosford
  - Federal division: Robertson
- Elevation: 16 m (52 ft)

Population
  - Total: 14 (SAL 2021)
- Postcode: 2250
- Parish: Mangrove
Suburbs around Greengrove
Mangrove Creek	Mangrove Mountain	Central Mangrove
Lower Mangrove	Greengrove	Glenworth Valley
	Spencer	Mount White

Greengrove is a locality of and town within the Central Coast region of New South Wales, Australia, near Mangrove Mountain and adjoining the Popran National Park about 40 kilometres (25 mi) west of Gosford. It is part of the Central Coast Council local government area.

Greengrove is a narrow north-to-south locality spread along the east bank of Mangrove Creek and is traversed by Wisemans Ferry Road. Two district pioneers, Elizabeth Donovan (1791–1891) and Richard Woodbury (1811–1897) are honoured with parks bearing their name within the locality.
