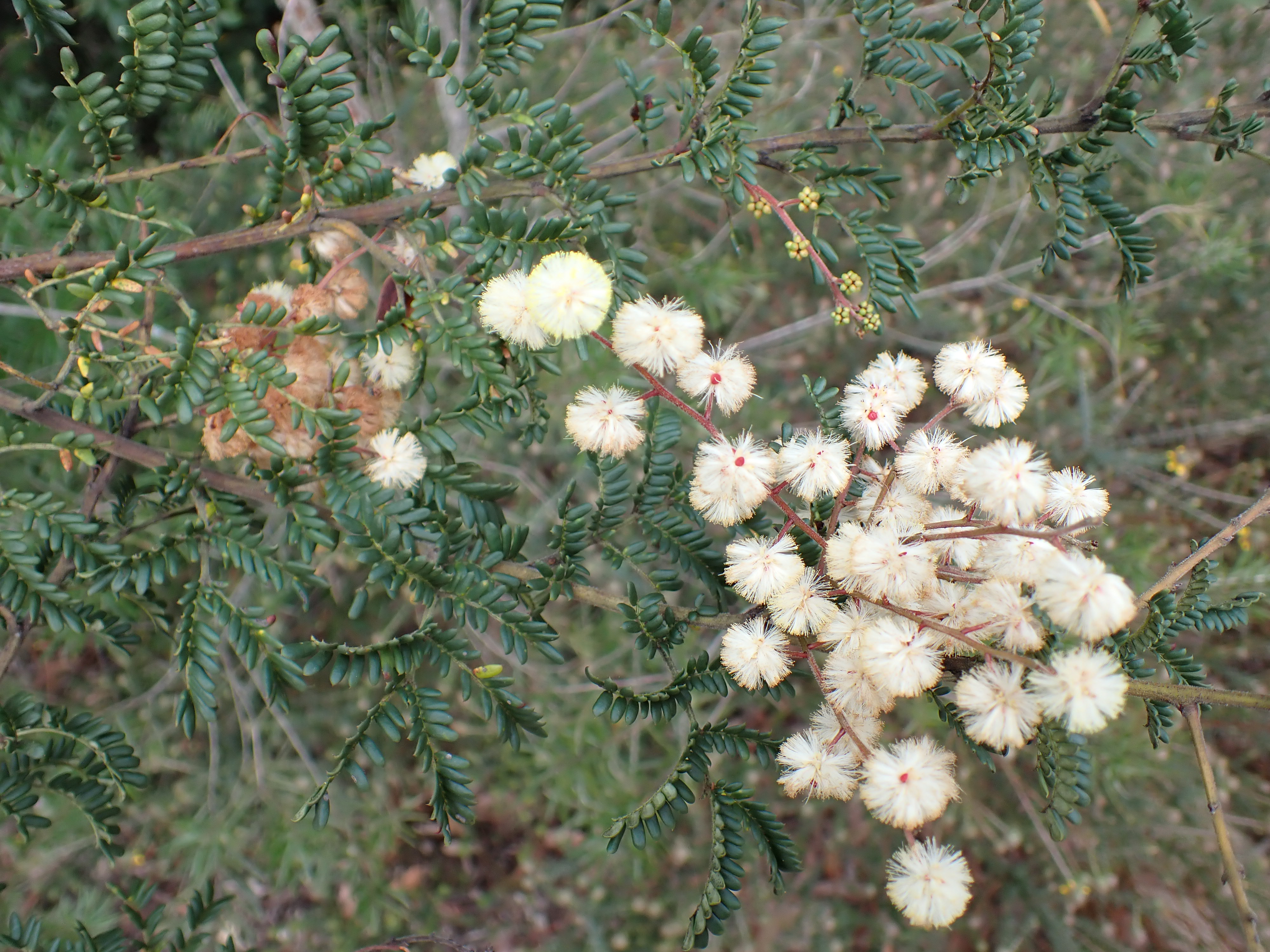

Scientific classification
- Kingdom: Plantae
- Clade: Embryophytes
- Clade: Tracheophytes
- Clade: Angiosperms
- Clade: Eudicots
- Clade: Rosids
- Order: Fabales
- Family: Fabaceae
- Subfamily: Caesalpinioideae
- Clade: Mimosoid clade
- Genus: Acacia
- Species: A. kulnurensis

Binomial name
- Acacia kulnurensis Kodela & Tindale
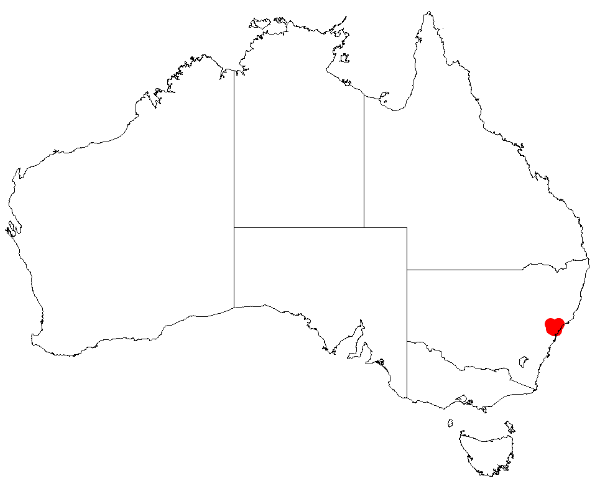
- Occurrence data from Australasian Virtual Herbarium

= Acacia kulnurensis =

Species of legume

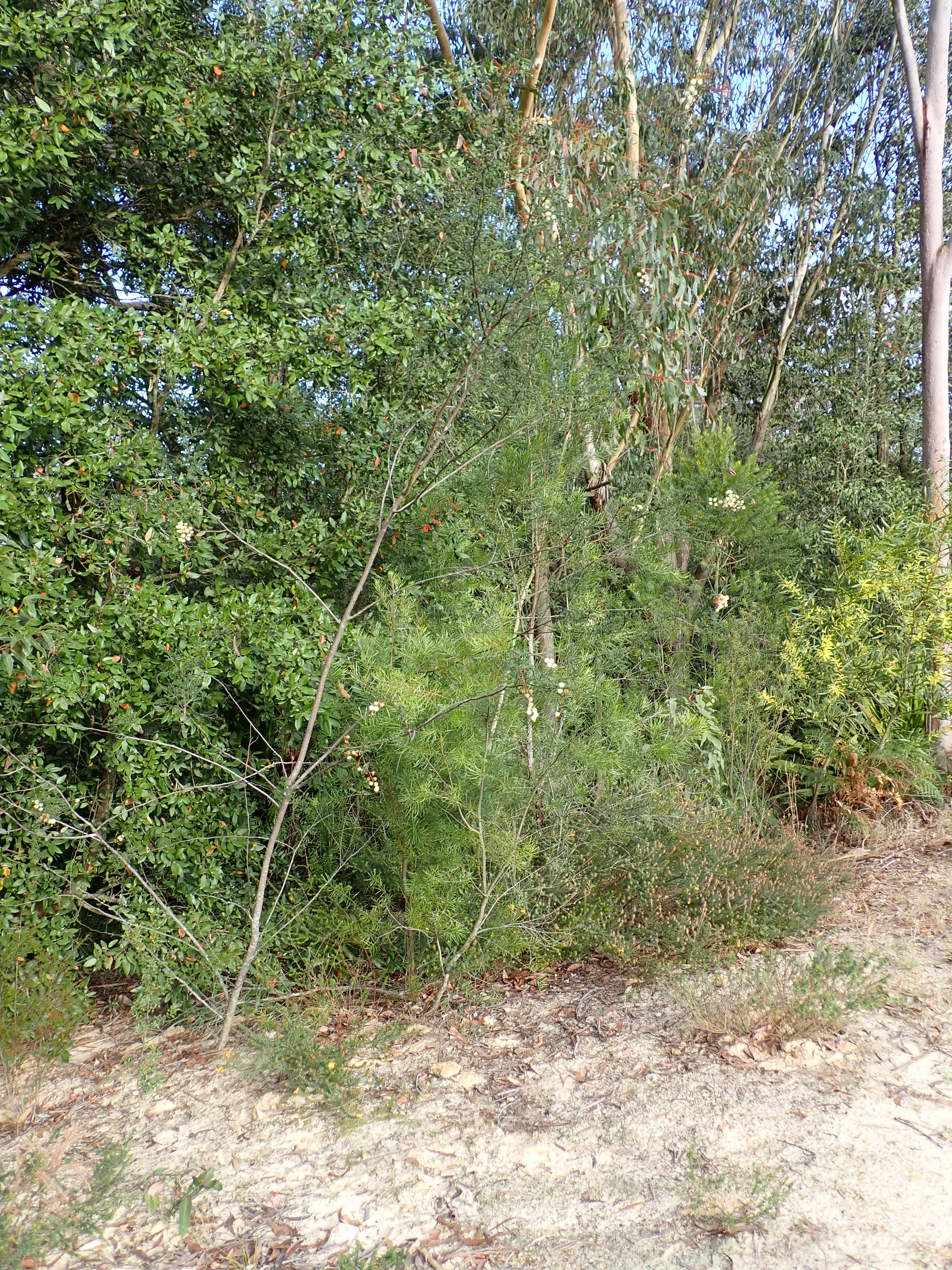
Habit in Kulnura

Acacia kulnurensis, commonly known as the Kulnura wattle, is a species of flowering plant in the family Fabaceae and is endemic to a small area of New South Wales, Australia. It is a slender, spindly or spreading shrub to small tree with bipinnate leaves, spherical heads of cream-coloured to pale yellow flowers in racemes or panicles, and leathery, straight or curved pods.

== Description ==
Acacia kulnurensis is a slender, spindly or spreading shrub or small tree that typically grows to a height of up to 4 m (13 ft), often has pendulous branches and branchlets with longitudinal ridges and covered with soft hairs. The leaves are bipinnate with 3 to 13 pairs of pinnae 5–45 mm (0.20–1.77 in) long, each with 6 to 15 pairs of oblong to elliptic or lance-shaped pinnules 2.5–8.5 mm (0.098–0.335 in) long, 0.8–4.0 mm (0.031–0.157 in) wide, sometimes with the narrower end towards the base. The flowers are borne in spherical heads in axils, on the ends of branches or in panicles up to 290 mm (11 in) long. Each head is on a hairy peduncle 4–15 mm (0.16–0.59 in) long, with 5 to 11 cream-coloured to pale yellow flowers. Flowering occurs from March to September, and the pods are straight or curved, leathery, up to 30–130 mm (1.2–5.1 in) long, 11–17 mm (0.43–0.67 in) wide, brown or black, straight sided or sometimes irregularly constricted between the seeds.

== Taxonomy ==
Acacia kulnurensis was first formally described in 2013 by Phillip Kodela and Mary Tindale in the journal Telopea from specimens collected south of Broke on the road to Kulnura in 1972. The specific epithet (kulnurensis) refers to the location of the type location, Kulnura.

== Distribution and habitat ==
Kulnura wattle grows mostly in sandy soil on sandstone in drier places on upper hillsides and ridges above about 200 m (660 ft) in altitude, in the Bucketty – Kulnura – Mangrove Mountain areas and near Kurri Kurri, in the Hunter Valley of New South Wales.

== See also ==
- List of Acacia species
