= Mooney Mooney Creek =

Coordinates: 33°21′S 151°15′E

Mooney Mooney
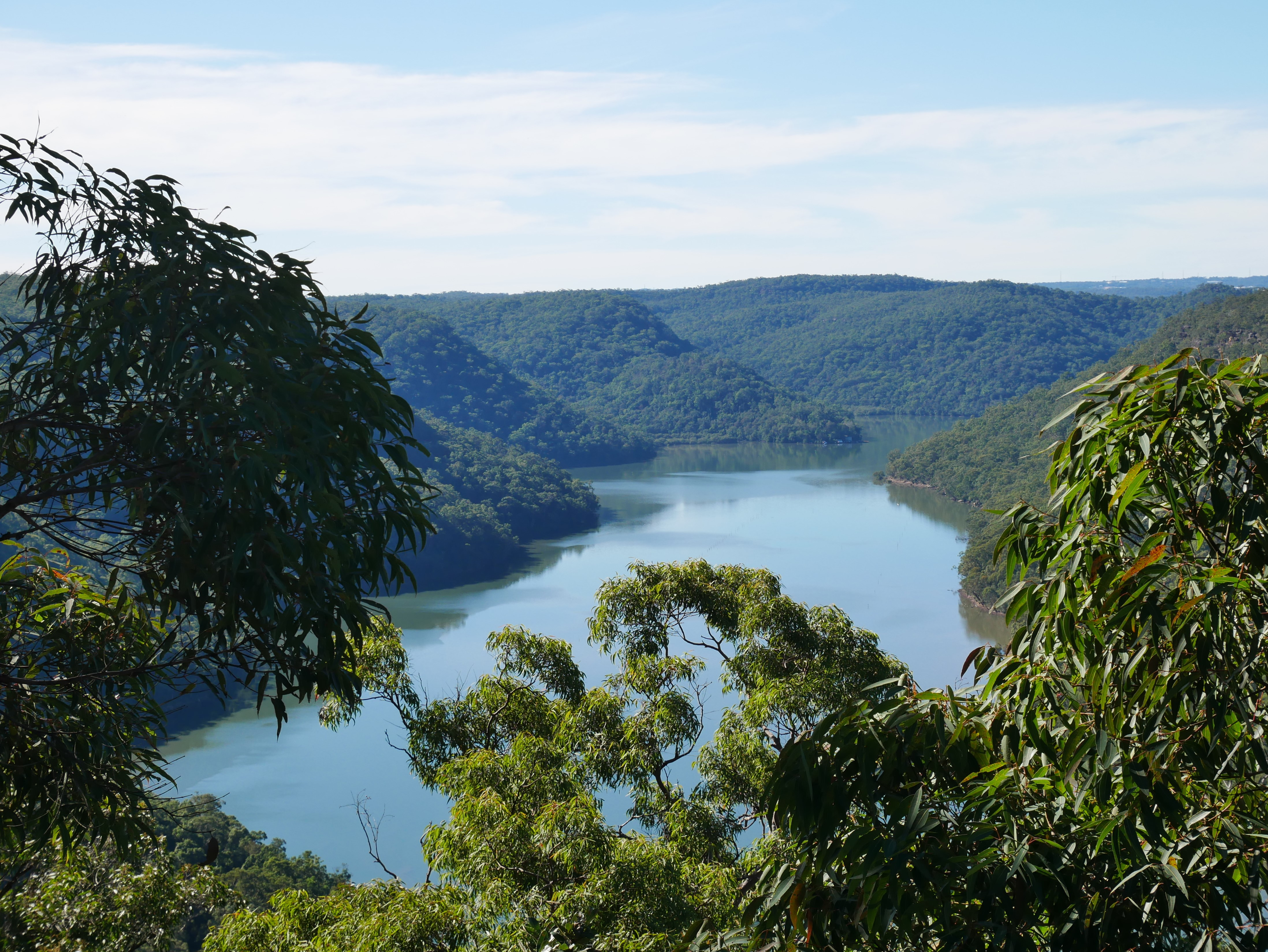
- Although named Mooney Mooney Creek, it is actually a river.

Location
- Country: Australia
- State: New South Wales
- Region: Sydney Basin (IBRA), Central Coast
- Local government areas: Central Coast
- Town: Mooney Mooney

Physical characteristics
- Source: Peats Ridge
  - location: Central Mangrove
  - elevation: 293 m (961 ft)
- Mouth: confluence with Hawkesbury River
  - location: Mooney Mooney
  - elevation: 0 m (0 ft)
- Length: 32 km (20 mi)

Basin features
- River system: Hawkesbury-Nepean catchment
- Tributaries
  - left: Little Mooney Mooney Creek, Floods Creek, Piles Creek
  - right: Ausburn Creek, Calverts Creek
- Bridges: Mooney Mooney Bridge; Old Mooney Mooney Bridge
- National park: Brisbane Water National Park

The Mooney Mooney Creek, a perennial river that is part of the Hawkesbury-Nepean catchment, is located in the Central Coast region of New South Wales, Australia.

== Course and features ==
The Mooney Mooney Creek rises southeast of Central Mangrove below Peats Ridge, and flows generally south before reaching its confluence with the Hawkesbury River at the locality of Mooney Mooney. The river descends 294 metres (965 ft) over its 32-kilometre (20 mi) course.

Although called a creek, the watercourse is designated as a river, and is impounded by the Mooney Mooney Upper Dam, below Mount White. The Pacific Motorway, via the Mooney Mooney Bridge, and the Central Coast Highway crosses the river, both east of the Calga interchange.

== See also ==
- List of rivers of Australia
- List of rivers of New South Wales (L–Z)
- Mooney Mooney Bridge
- Rivers of New South Wales
