= Wyong (disambiguation) =

Wyong is a town in New South Wales, Australia.

Wyong may also refer to:

- Wyong Shire, a former local government area of the Australian state of New South Wales
- Wyong railway station, in New South Wales
- Wyong River, a river and locality of New South Wales
