= Mangrove Creek (New South Wales) =

Coordinates: 33°19′S 151°08′E

Mangrove

Location
- Country: Australia
- State: New South Wales
- Region: Sydney Basin (IBRA), Central Coast
- Local government areas: Gosford
- Towns: Upper Mangrove, Mangrove Creek, Lower Mangrove, Spencer

Physical characteristics
- Source: Hunter Range
  - location: The Letter A
  - elevation: 322 m (1,056 ft)
- Mouth: confluence with Hawkesbury River
  - location: Spencer
  - elevation: 0 m (0 ft)
- Length: 50 km (31 mi)

Basin features
- River system: Hawkesbury-Nepean catchment
- Tributaries
  - left: Boomerang Creek, Warre Warren Creek, Worleys Creek, Ironbark Creek, Popran Creek
  - right: Deep Creek (Gosford, New South Wales)
- National park: Dharug National Park

The Mangrove Creek, a perennial river that is part of the Hawkesbury-Nepean catchment, is located in the Central Coast region of New South Wales, Australia.

== Course and features ==
The Mangrove Creek rises about 5 kilometres (3.1 mi) southwest of Mount McQuiod below the Hunter Range, and flows generally south, joined by six minor tributaries, before reaching its confluence with the Hawkesbury River between Spencer and Wendoree Park. The river descends 323 metres (1,060 ft) over its 50-kilometre (31 mi) course.

Although called a creek, the watercourse is designated as a river, and its headwaters are impounded by the Mangrove Creek Dam, which forms a major part of the water supply to the Central Coast. Below the dam, the creek flows in a southerly direction through the settlements of Upper Mangrove, Mangrove Creek, Greengrove and Lower Mangrove, before joining the Hawkesbury River.

== See also ==
- List of rivers of Australia
- List of rivers of New South Wales (L–Z)
- Mangrove Creek Dam
- Popran Valley
- Rivers of New South Wales
