= Ourimbah Creek =

Coordinates: 33°20′S 151°20′E

Ourimbah Ourinbah Creek
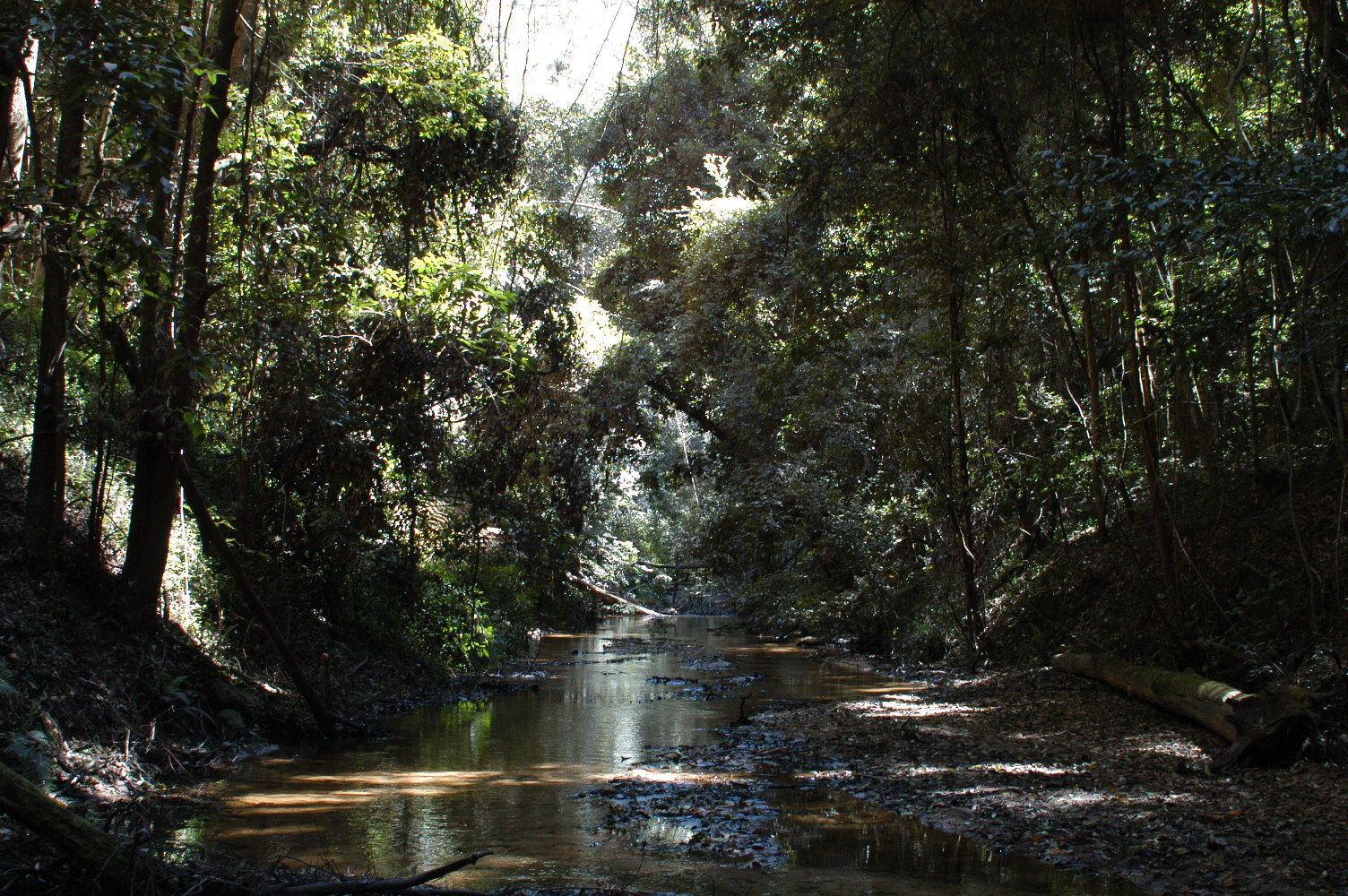
- Etymology: Aboriginal: meaning bora or ceremonial ground; word for "the sacred circle on the initiation site for investing the Oorin or belt of manhood"

Location
- Country: Australia
- State: New South Wales
- Region: Sydney Basin (IBRA), Central Coast
- Local government area: Central Coast

Physical characteristics
- Source: Hunter Range
  - location: near Kulnura
  - elevation: 304 m (997 ft)
- Mouth: Tuggerah Lake
  - location: near Tuggerah
  - elevation: 7 m (23 ft)
- Length: 37 km (23 mi)

Basin features
- River system: Central Coast catchment
- Nature reserve: Jilliby State Conservation Area

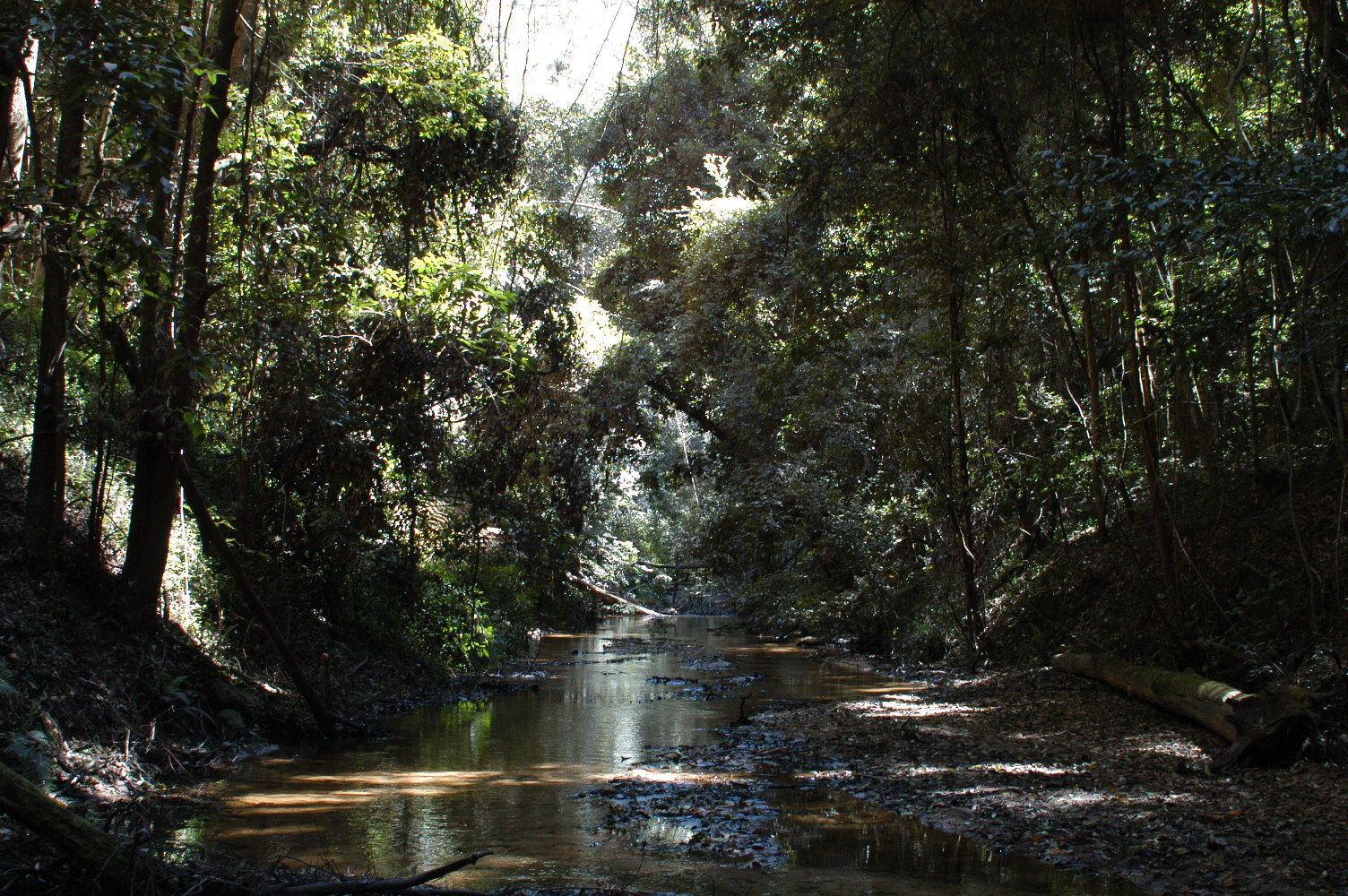
Ourimbah Creek

Ourimbah Creek is a perennial stream of the Central Coast catchment in New South Wales, Australia.

== Course and features ==
Ourimbah Creek rises on the southern slopes of the Hunter Range, about 1.6 kilometres (0.99 mi) south of Kulnura. The river flows generally south southeast and east northeast, before reaching its mouth within Tuggerah Lake, about 4.8 kilometres (3.0 mi) southeast of Tuggerah. The river descends 304 metres (997 ft) over its 37-kilometre (23 mi) course.

Ourimbah Creek and the Wyong River supply most of the fresh water that flows into Tuggerah Lake, which is usually open to the Tasman Sea at The Entrance.

The Pacific Motorway and the Pacific Highway both cross the river, at Kangy Angy.

== Etymology ==
The name of the town Ourimbah, near which the river passes, is derived from the Australian Aboriginal word meaning bora or ceremonial ground; or the word for "the sacred circle on the initiation site for investing the Oorin or belt of manhood".

== See also ==
- List of rivers of Australia
- List of rivers of New South Wales (L-Z)
- Rivers of New South Wales
