= Acacia matthewii =

- Habit in Dharug National Park

Scientific classification
- Kingdom: Plantae
- Clade: Tracheophytes
- Clade: Angiosperms
- Clade: Eudicots
- Clade: Rosids
- Order: Fabales
- Family: Fabaceae
- Subfamily: Caesalpinioideae
- Clade: Mimosoid clade
- Genus: Acacia
- Species: A. matthewii

Binomial name
- Acacia matthewii Tindale & S.J.Davies
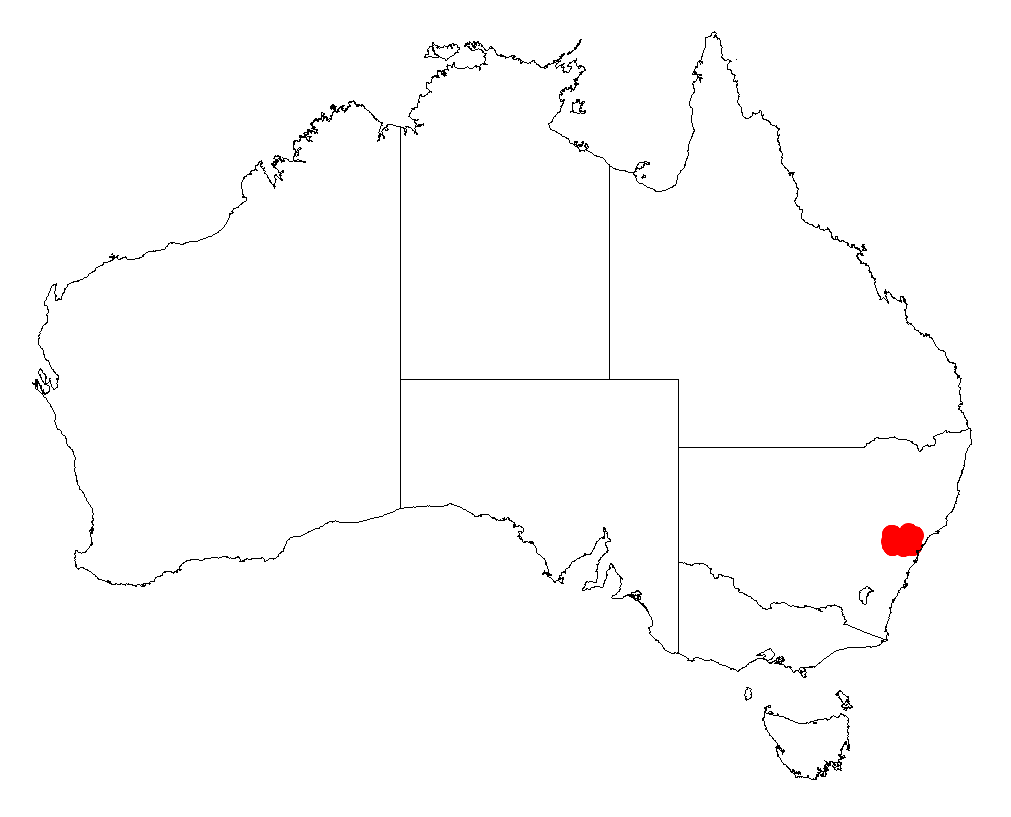
- Occurrence data from AVH

Synonyms
- Racosperma matthewii (Tindale & S.J.Davies) Pedley

Species of legume

Acacia matthewii, commonly known as Matthew's wattle, is a species of flowering plant in the family Fabaceae and is endemic to eastern New South Wales, Australia. It is a tall shrub or tree with flaky to fibrous bark, narrowly elliptic, sickle-shaped phyllodes, spikes of bright yellow flowers arranged in racemes, and linear, leathery pods.

== Description ==
Acacia matthewii is a tall shrub or small tree that typically grows to a height of 3–15 m (9.8–49.2 ft) and has distinct juvenile and adult foliage. Its bark is reddish brown to grey, and peels in long, thin flakes. The branchlets are angular, light brown to reddish brown, often greenish and scurfy. The adult phyllodes are narrowly elliptic to very narrowly elliptic, sickle-shaped, 60–190 mm (2.4–7.5 in) long, 9–25 mm (0.35–0.98 in) wide, more or less leathery, bright green and glossy. There are usually three prominent longitudinal veins and three to five less prominent veins between them. The flowers are bright yellow and borne in up to three spikes 20–60 mm (0.79–2.36 in) long in racemes 5–25 mm (0.20–0.98 in) long. Flowering occurs from August to November, and the pods are linear, more or less flat, straight or sometimes curved, 17–100 mm (0.67–3.94 in) long, 2.5–4 mm (0.098–0.157 in) wide, leathery, wrinkled and glabrous. The seeds are 2.8–5.3 mm (0.11–0.21 in) long and brown to almost black.

== Taxonomy ==
Acacia matthewii was first formally described in 1992 by Mary Tindale and Stuart James Davies in Australian Systematic Botany from specimens collected 12.2 km (7.6 mi) south-west of Wollombi in 1978. The specific epithet (matthesii) honours Patrick Matthew, a naturalist of the central coast of New South Wales.

== Distribution and habitat ==
Matthew's wattle grows on the edges of wet forest, woodland and in pure stands, in sandy soils on sandstone and shale, between Rylstone, Kandos and Capertee and Dharug National Park, especially arounf Mount Yengo and Howes Valley.
