= Peats Ridge =

- Suburb
- Interactive map of Peats Ridge
- Country: Australia
- State: New South Wales
- City: Central Coast
- LGA: Central Coast Council
- Location: 88 km (55 mi) N of Sydney; 25 km (16 mi) NW of Gosford

Government
  - State electorate: Gosford
  - Federal division: Robertson
- Elevation: 280 m (920 ft)

Population
  - Total: 377 (2016 census)
- Postcode: 2250
- Parish: Narara
- Mean max temp: 21.8 °C (71.2 °F)
- Mean min temp: 11.3 °C (52.3 °F)
- Annual rainfall: 1,195.4 mm (47.06 in)
Suburbs around Peats Ridge
	Central Mangrove
Mangrove Mountain	Peats Ridge	Somersby
Glenworth Valley	Calga	Somersby

Peats Ridge is a suburb in the Central Coast region of New South Wales, Australia, as part of the Central Coast Council local government area.

Peats Ridge was opened to white settlement relatively late, as the Great North Road to the Hunter Valley left from Spencer on the Hawkesbury River, effectively bypassing the area until the early part of the 20th century. The area is named for George Peat. A number of fine aboriginal rock carvings survive in Peats Ridge.

Formerly an area with many citrus orchards and market gardens, the improved access to Sydney through the Sydney-Newcastle Freeway has meant that it has increasingly become the home of commuters with jobs in Sydney. There are a number of nurseries and horse studs in the district.

== Geography ==
=== Climate ===
Due to its moderate altitude, Peats Ridge experiences an oceanic climate bordering on a humid subtropical climate (Köppen: Cfb/Cfa) with warm, wetter summers and relatively mild, drier winters. On average, the town has 92.8 clear days with 108.4 cloudy days per annum. The wettest recorded day was 9 June 2007 with 276.6 mm (10.89 in) of rainfall. Extreme temperatures ranged from 42.9 °C (109.2 °F) on 15 January 2001 to −0.1 °C (31.8 °F) on 25 July 1995 and 4 August 1994

Climate data for Peats Ridge (33.31°S 151.24°E) (280 m (920 ft) AMSL) (1981-2015)
Month	Jan	Feb	Mar	Apr	May	Jun	Jul	Aug	Sep	Oct	Nov	Dec	Year
Record high °C (°F)	42.9 (109.2)	40.5 (104.9)	38.9 (102.0)	34.7 (94.5)	26.9 (80.4)	23.6 (74.5)	23.7 (74.7)	28.9 (84.0)	33.3 (91.9)	38.6 (101.5)	41.9 (107.4)	40.8 (105.4)	42.9 (109.2)
Mean daily maximum °C (°F)	27.0 (80.6)	26.4 (79.5)	24.6 (76.3)	22.0 (71.6)	19.1 (66.4)	16.3 (61.3)	15.8 (60.4)	17.7 (63.9)	20.5 (68.9)	22.8 (73.0)	24.1 (75.4)	25.8 (78.4)	21.8 (71.3)
Mean daily minimum °C (°F)	16.3 (61.3)	16.4 (61.5)	14.6 (58.3)	12.0 (53.6)	9.5 (49.1)	7.2 (45.0)	6.0 (42.8)	6.6 (43.9)	8.7 (47.7)	10.9 (51.6)	13.0 (55.4)	14.8 (58.6)	11.3 (52.4)
Record low °C (°F)	7.9 (46.2)	8.4 (47.1)	6.2 (43.2)	3.7 (38.7)	1.1 (34.0)	0.0 (32.0)	−0.1 (31.8)	−0.1 (31.8)	0.0 (32.0)	1.4 (34.5)	4.8 (40.6)	5.8 (42.4)	−0.1 (31.8)
Average precipitation mm (inches)	113.3 (4.46)	154.3 (6.07)	135.9 (5.35)	123.0 (4.84)	89.7 (3.53)	99.5 (3.92)	62.7 (2.47)	74.0 (2.91)	69.1 (2.72)	85.3 (3.36)	100.7 (3.96)	92.4 (3.64)	1,195.4 (47.06)
Average precipitation days (≥ 0.2 mm)	13.8	14.1	14.1	11.3	11.4	10.5	9.7	8.4	8.3	10.6	12.4	12.7	137.3
Average afternoon relative humidity (%)	64	66	66	66	67	66	60	55	54	58	61	63	62
Average dew point °C (°F)	17.1 (62.8)	17.4 (63.3)	15.8 (60.4)	13.1 (55.6)	10.8 (51.4)	8.3 (46.9)	6.3 (43.3)	6.5 (43.7)	8.2 (46.8)	10.9 (51.6)	13.3 (55.9)	15.6 (60.1)	11.9 (53.5)
Source: Bureau of Meteorology (1981-2015)
