= Lower Mangrove =

Coordinates: 33°24′54″S 151°09′36″E

- Suburb
- Interactive map of Lower Mangrove
- Country: Australia
- State: New South Wales
- City: Central Coast
- LGA: Central Coast Council
- Location: 41 km (25 mi) W of Gosford; 35 km (22 mi) E of Wisemans Ferry; 106 km (66 mi) N of Sydney

Government
  - State electorate: Gosford
  - Federal division: Robertson
- Elevation: 57 m (187 ft)

Population
  - Total: 70 (SAL 2021)
- Postcode: 2250
- Parish: Cowan
Suburbs around Lower Mangrove
	Mangrove Creek	Mangrove Mountain
Gunderman	Lower Mangrove	Greengrove
	Spencer	Spencer

Lower Mangrove is a suburb of the Central Coast region of New South Wales, Australia, located about 8 kilometres (5 mi) upstream and north of Spencer along Mangrove Creek. It is part of the Central Coast Council local government area.
