= Lower Hawkesbury Wesleyan Chapel =

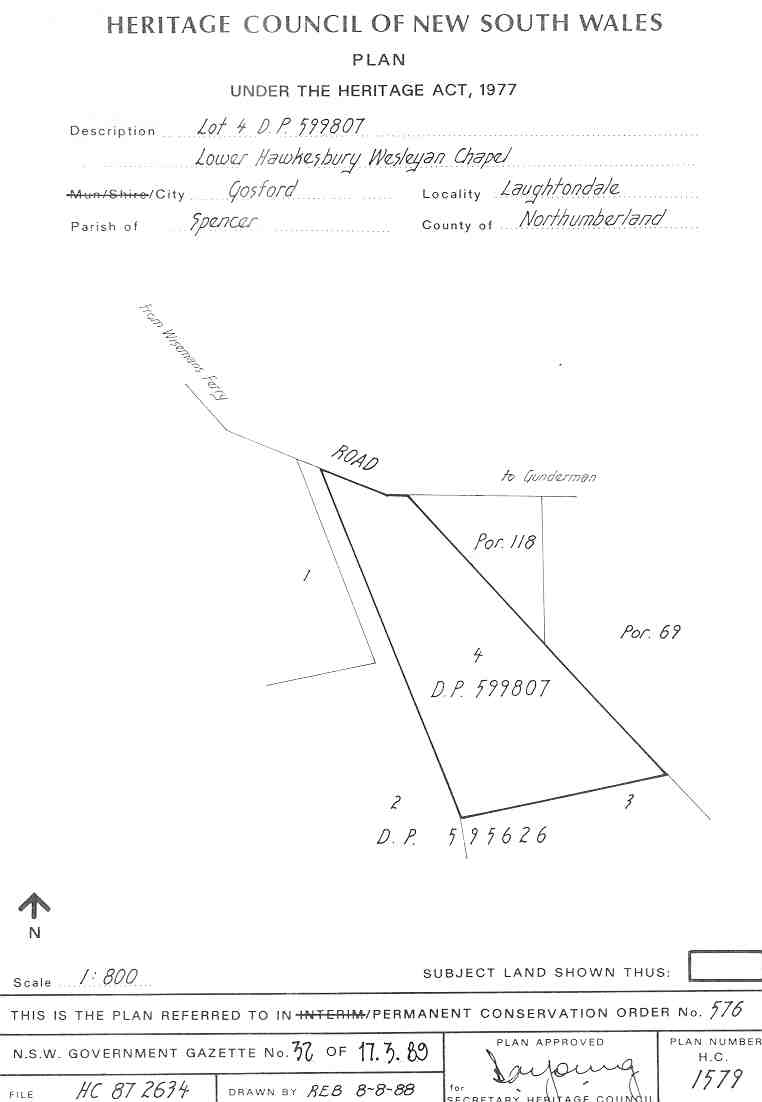
- Heritage boundaries

- Location within New South Wales Location within Australia
- 33.4218°S 151.0344°E
- Location: Wisemans Ferry Road, Gunderman, Central Coast, New South Wales, Australia

History
- Built: 1852

Site notes
- Owner: Dharug and Lower Hawkesbury Historical Society

New South Wales Heritage Register
- Official name: Lower Hawkesbury Wesleyan Chapel and site; Wesleyan Chapel Gunderman
- Type: state heritage (built)
- Designated: 2 April 1999
- Reference no.: 576
- Type: Chapel
- Category: Religion
- Builders: Greentree Brothers

Lower Hawkesbury Wesleyan Chapel is a heritage-listed former Wesleyan chapel and now meeting venue at Wisemans Ferry Road, Gunderman, Central Coast, New South Wales, Australia. It was built in 1852 by Greentree Brothers. The property is owned by the Dharug and Lower Hawkesbury Historical Society. It was added to the New South Wales State Heritage Register on 2 April 1999.

== History ==
By 1818, Wesleyan Methodism had spread along the Hawkesbury River, with many local settlers being from Sussex, Kent and Cornwall. Worship was originally held in private houses, and ministerial care was directed from Windsor.

George Everingham was the first Australian born Wesleyan preacher. A son of First Fleet member Matthew Everingham and Elizabeth Rimes George, he married Keturah Stubbs and in 1832 bought the property known as "Greens" at Lower Hawkesbury. Everingham always walked or rowed a boat to his religious appointments, sometimes taking three days to get there. Part of "Greens" was leased to George William Douglass. From 1841 local meetings were organised at "Greens" by George Everingham, John Laughton and George Douglass. In 1838 George Douglass converted to Methodism.

By 1852 the congregation was too large for private homes and George Everingham donated half an acre of "Greens" property to the church for a Chapel and school. The sandstone Chapel was built by Greentree brothers for 300 pounds. A tea-party had raised 200 pounds before work started and on 9 June 1859 another tea-meeting raised 61 pounds to clear the debt

The first service was held on 22 April 1855. The congregation had arrived on Sunday but the Minister John Watkin had got lost and didn't arrive until Monday. Congregations mostly came by boat. Methodism thrived into the nineteenth century and many local men became preachers.

By the 1950s attendances were well down and the last Methodist service was conducted at the Chapel in 1963.

The Divine Word Missionaries leased "Greens" and the Chapel at a peppercorn rent for 10 years. The first Mass was celebrated on Sunday June 25, 1965.

The lease was not renewed and the Chapel was unused for many years. The Dharug and Lower Hawkesbury Historic Society leased the premises from the Uniting Church in Australia in 1984 for a peppercorn rent. In 1986 they received a Bicentennial Grant, which together with substantial fundraising allowed for the purchase of the property. The Chapel and grounds are used for meetings, social events and are part of historic tours conducted in the area. The Chapel has also had services conducted on request.

== Description ==
The sandstone chapel is built on half an acre of the property "Greens" donated by George Everingham. The shingle roof has been replaced by a corrugated steel roof and the windows have recently been replaced as per the original ones. The inside has a number of pews and a holy table. The grounds also have a small building complete with toilets that serve as a meeting area and amenities block for tours.

The physical condition is good, as the Society has replaced the roof and windows, which were termite affected. There is subsidence in the front corner and a major drainage problem as the building has no drainage underneath and no space for air to circulate. Work on Wisemans Ferry Road raised the road level and this has increased the problem.

The chapel remains as constructed with the exception of the roof, which has been replaced in tin along the original roof line. The windows were replaced with glass matching the originals. A small amenities block has been built further up the property.

== Heritage listing ==
The Lower Hawkesbury Wesleyan Chapel site is of rare local significance. It is significant for its association with the development and practice of Wesleyan Methodism in the Lower Hawkesbury area. It is also significant for its association with early European settlement in the Lower Hawkesbury. Through its use by the community for social, historical, tourist and educational events it maintains this significance.

The Lower Hawkesbury Wesleyan Chapel is therefore a rare example of places of worship for the Wesleyans in the Lower Hawkesbury area in the 19th century. As the oldest intact usable stone chapel of this era in the area, it is a rare example of its purpose.

It is associated within settlement in the area and has been almost continuously used by the community from 1855 to the present day.

Lower Hawkesbury Wesleyan Chapel was listed on the New South Wales State Heritage Register on 2 April 1999 having satisfied the following criteria.

The place is important in demonstrating the course, or pattern, of cultural or natural history in New South Wales.

The site on which the lower Wesleyan Chapel stands has been involved in the history of the Lower Hawkesbury area from the early nineteenth century. It was initially the home of Richard Woodbury, the first police constable for the area and subsequently the home of George Everingham who as a local preacher was intimately involved with the development of Wesleyanism in the Lower Hawkesbury. The Lower Hawkesbury Wesleyan Chapel built in 1855 on land given by George Everingham is an integral part of the history of the early settlement, of the local community and of the development of Wesleyanism in the Lower Hawkesbury.

There have been a number of prominent figures associated with the Chapel either as preachers or as attendees of the Chapel but of particular note are the lay preachers George Everingham and his wife Keturah (née Stubbs), John Laughton and his wife Charlotte, and George Douglas and his wife Elizabeth.

The local Wesleyans raised all the funds for the construction of the Chapel as a place of worship and it was the principal religious and social centre for the community from 1855 to 1963. The present owners the D&LHHSI; raised considerable funding (plus a grant) to purchase the Chapel in 1986. A number of the earliest members of the D&LHHSI;, in particular Louise Prince and Freda Deas, now in her mid-nineties, grew up in the Lower Hawkesbury area and vividly recall attending church services and tea parties at the Wesleyan Chapel. Since purchasing the property the Historical Society has carried out much restoration work of the Chapel and improvement of the surrounding grounds. The society continues to fund the maintenance and upkeep of the chapel.

The site is the only remaining intact stone church built in the mid-nineteenth century in the Lower Hawkesbury. It is therefore of local historical significance.

The place has a strong or special association with a person, or group of persons, of importance of cultural or natural history of New South Wales's history.

It has a strong association with the early pioneering European families of the lower Hawkesbury Valley.

The place is important in demonstrating aesthetic characteristics and/or a high degree of creative or technical achievement in New South Wales.

The Chapel was a visibly prominent landmark in the mid-nineteenth and early twentieth century prior to the road construction. The Chapel is oriented to the Hawkesbury River as this was the point of arrival and departure for the members of the early congregations. The descent on the left hand side through bush to a natural rock landing and the iron rings driven into the rocks would have been used by the Churchgoers particularly after George Everingham acquired the Woodbury property. The Chapel itself is set on the eminence on which the Woodbury house itself would have been located in 1827. The worn steps show evidence of constant use for over 130 years. As the oldest usable intact stone chapel in the Lower Hawkesbury, it significantly contributes to the nineteenth and twentieth century aesthetics of the area. Although it now appears to be set down from the current road it is still a prominent landmark which can be seen from both the road and the Hawkesbury River. It is therefore of local aesthetic significance.

The place has strong or special association with a particular community or cultural group in New South Wales for social, cultural or spiritual reasons.

The Chapel was used as a principal venue for the religious and social activities of the Wesleyan community from 1855 to 1963. From 1965 to 1973 the Divine Word Missionaries, a Roman Catholic order, used it for religious purposes. From 1984, it has been the home of the Dharug and Lower Hawkesbury Historical Society Incorporated. This culminated in their purchase of the Chapel in 1986. Since then it has been used regularly for historical activities and it houses the Society's archives which document the history of the Lower Hawkesbury in written and pictorial form. It is therefore of local social significance.

The place has potential to yield information that will contribute to an understanding of the cultural or natural history of New South Wales.

The site would contain archaeological evidence of its operation as a Wesleyan Chapel. A Gosford Heritage Review conducted in 1997 records the two sandstone finials and the circular motif head and vent on the front facade as being unusual details. They could be of future research value. There is a large, single stone lintel and carved stone with date above the door also with research value.

The Chapel also contains the archives of the D&LHHSI; which incorporate Wesleyan history as well as tapes and original research of the Lower Hawkesbury area including research into the pioneer families of the region. It is therefore of local research significance.

As previously noted the adjacent amenities block has been assessed as of no historical, aesthetic, social or research significance.

The place possesses uncommon, rare or endangered aspects of the cultural or natural history of New South Wales.

The Gosford Heritage Review of 1997 in Evaluation of Significance adjudged the Chapel to be rare in terms of Historic, Aesthetic, and Social as far as the local area is concerned. Of particular note are the two stone finials and the stone block and date carved above the door.

The Lower Hawkesbury Wesleyan Chapel is therefore a rare example of places of worship for the Wesleyans in the Lower Hawkesbury area in the nineteenth century. As the oldest intact usable stone chapel of this era in the area it is a rare example of its purpose.

The place is important in demonstrating the principal characteristics of a class of cultural or natural places/environments in New South Wales.

It demonstrates the main characteristics of a religious chapel of its time.
