= Glenworth Valley, New South Wales =

Glenworth Valley New South Wales
- Coordinates: 33°24′54″S 151°11′04″E
- Population: 10 (2016 census)
  - Density: 0.44/km^{2} (1.1/sq mi)
- Postcode(s): 2250
- Elevation: 5 m (16 ft)
- Area: 22.8 km^{2} (8.8 sq mi)
- Time zone: AEST (UTC+10)
  - Summer (DST): AEDT (UTC+11)
- Location: 73 km (45 mi) N of Sydney; 20 km (12 mi) W of Gosford
- LGA(s): Central Coast Council
- Region: Central Coast
- County: Northumberland
- Parish: Popran
- State electorate(s): Gosford
- Federal division(s): Robertson
Suburbs around Glenworth Valley:
Greengrove	Mangrove Mountain	Somersby
Lower Mangrove	Glenworth Valley	Calga
Spencer	Mount White	Calga

Glenworth Valley is a suburb of the Central Coast Council local government area in the Central Coast region of New South Wales, Australia. About 73 km (45 mi) north of Sydney and 20 km (12 mi) west of Gosford, at the 2016 census it had a population of 10 people. Popran Creek runs through the entire valley and rises in the locality of Central Mangrove and then flows for approximately 24 km (15 mi) in a mostly southern direction until it reaches Mangrove Creek.

== History ==
The history of Popran Creek and Glenworth Valley includes pre and post-European settlement. Indigenous people from the 'Daruk' and 'Darkinyung' communities populated the lower Hawkesbury region- migrating between valleys hunting and fishing.

After initial exploration by Europeans primary industrial activities included timber getting, small farming, dairying and fishing. Some of these settlers remained in the Mangrove and Glenworth Valley locality for at least five generations.

== See also ==
- List of valleys of Australia
- Hawkesbury River
- Mangrove Creek (New South Wales)
- Joseph Kelly (New South Wales politician)
- Glenworth Valley site focussing on history of the Popran valley
