= Mooney Mooney Bridge =

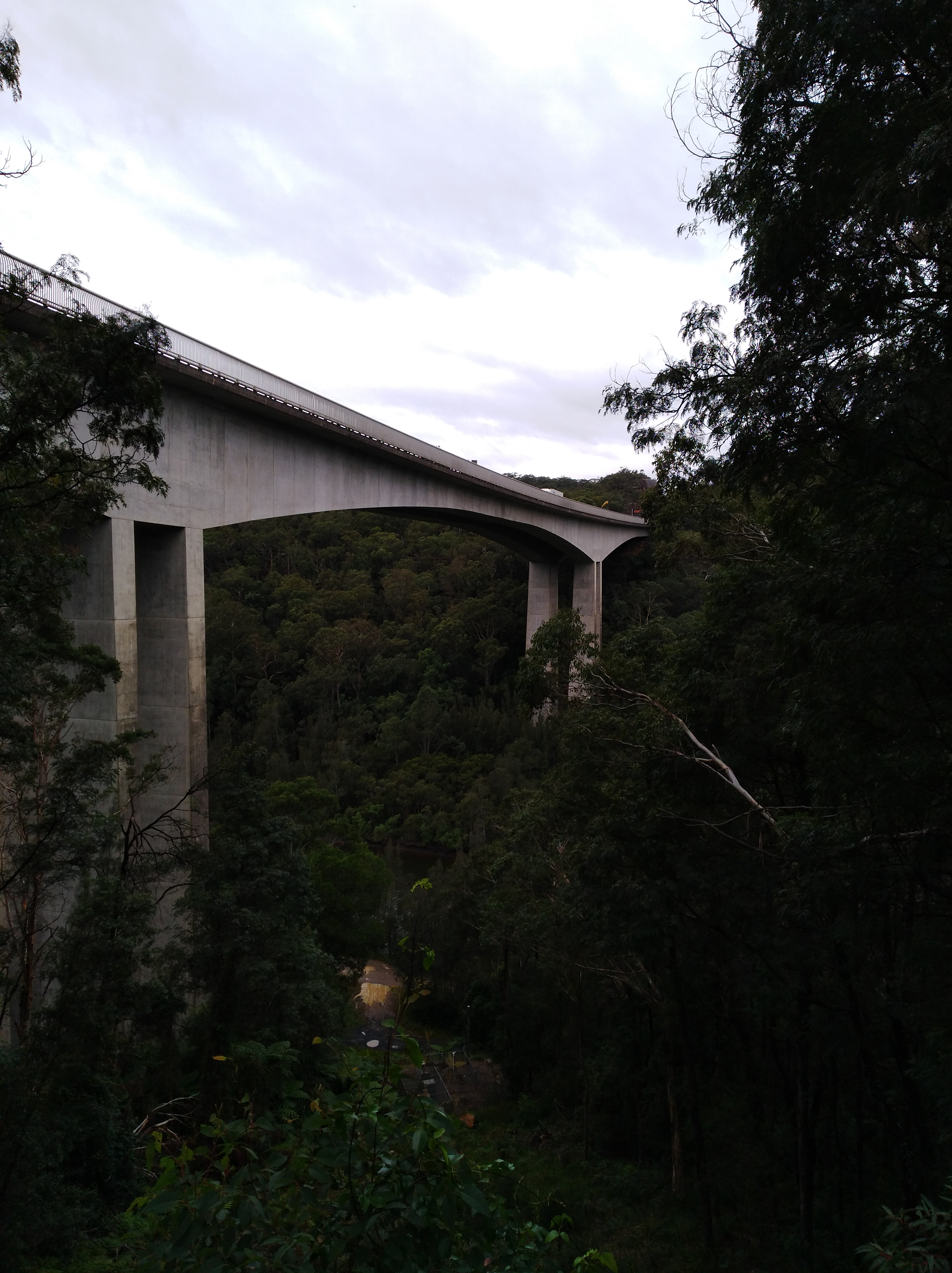
- Mooney Mooney Bridge in May 2020
- Coordinates: 33°25′59″S 151°15′14″E
- Carries: Pacific Motorway: Motor vehicles only
- Crosses: Mooney Mooney Creek
- Locale: Mooney Mooney, New South Wales, Australia
- Official name: Mooney Mooney Creek Bridge
- Named for: Mooney Mooney and Mooney Mooney Creek
- Owner: Transport for NSW
- Followed by: Old Mooney Mooney Creek Bridge

Characteristics
- Design: Box girder cantilever bridge
- Material: Concrete
- Total length: 480 metres (1,575 ft)
- Width: 27 metres (89 ft)
- Height: 75 metres (246 ft)
- Longest span: 220 metres (722 ft)
- No. of spans: 3
- No. of lanes: 6; as a grade-separated twin motorway

History
- Designer: Bruce Judd; Department of Main Roads
- Constructed by: Enpro Constructions
- Inaugurated: 14 December 1986
- Replaces: Old Mooney Mooney Creek Bridge (concurrent use as Pacific Highway) (B83)

Location
- Interactive map of Mooney Mooney Bridge

The Mooney Mooney Bridge is a twin cantilever bridge that carries the Pacific Motorway across Mooney Mooney Creek on the Central Coast, New South Wales, Australia.

== History ==
Construction of the bridge commenced in 1983 concurrent with the extension of the Pacific Motorway was extended from Calga to Somersby. The bridge was opened on 14 December 1986 by the Prime Minister of Australia, Bob Hawke.

== Design ==
Mooney Mooney Bridge was designed by Bruce Judd of the then Department of Main Roads and built by Enpro Constructions by the free cantilever method of post tensioned concrete. It consists of twin bridges, each bridge with a main span and two approach spans. The span at the western end of the bridge is 135 metres (443 ft) long, the main span is 220 metres (722 ft) long and the eastern span is 131 metres (430 ft) long.

The design has been said to demonstrate how good engineering design and good aesthetics are synonymous, and has been used as a standard in the design of bridges throughout New South Wales. They employ a two rail parapet which optimises views of the landscape. The bridges were designed with the natural surroundings in mind and form a simple uncluttered shape so not to detract from the natural bushland of the national park. The three span haunched girders on the bridge were critical to this as were the multiple piers that provide character and strength.

== Incidents ==
The Mooney Mooney Bridge has been the site of several accidents, resulting in the Pacific Motorway being closed to traffic and causing delays. Some of these accidents have prompted debate on whether a new road should be built to supplement the existing freeway.

On 23 October 2004 a semi-trailer's brakes failed coming down the Freeway and caused a pile-up involving 35 vehicles that had slowed down as a result of a car accident on the other side of the bridge. This accident resulted in the death of a woman. On 12 February 2007 another accident occurred when a truck was travelling down the freeway and lost control approaching the bridge, smashing through a guard rail and plunging 30 metres down an embankment at the side of the bridge.

The Mooney Mooney Bridge, because of its height, has been susceptible in the past to people committing suicide. As a result, a fence was erected along the side of the bridge to prevent people jumping off. This fence was erected in 2003 and cost $1 million.
