= Cedar Brush Creek =

Coordinates: 33°09′54″S 151°16′34″E

- Suburb
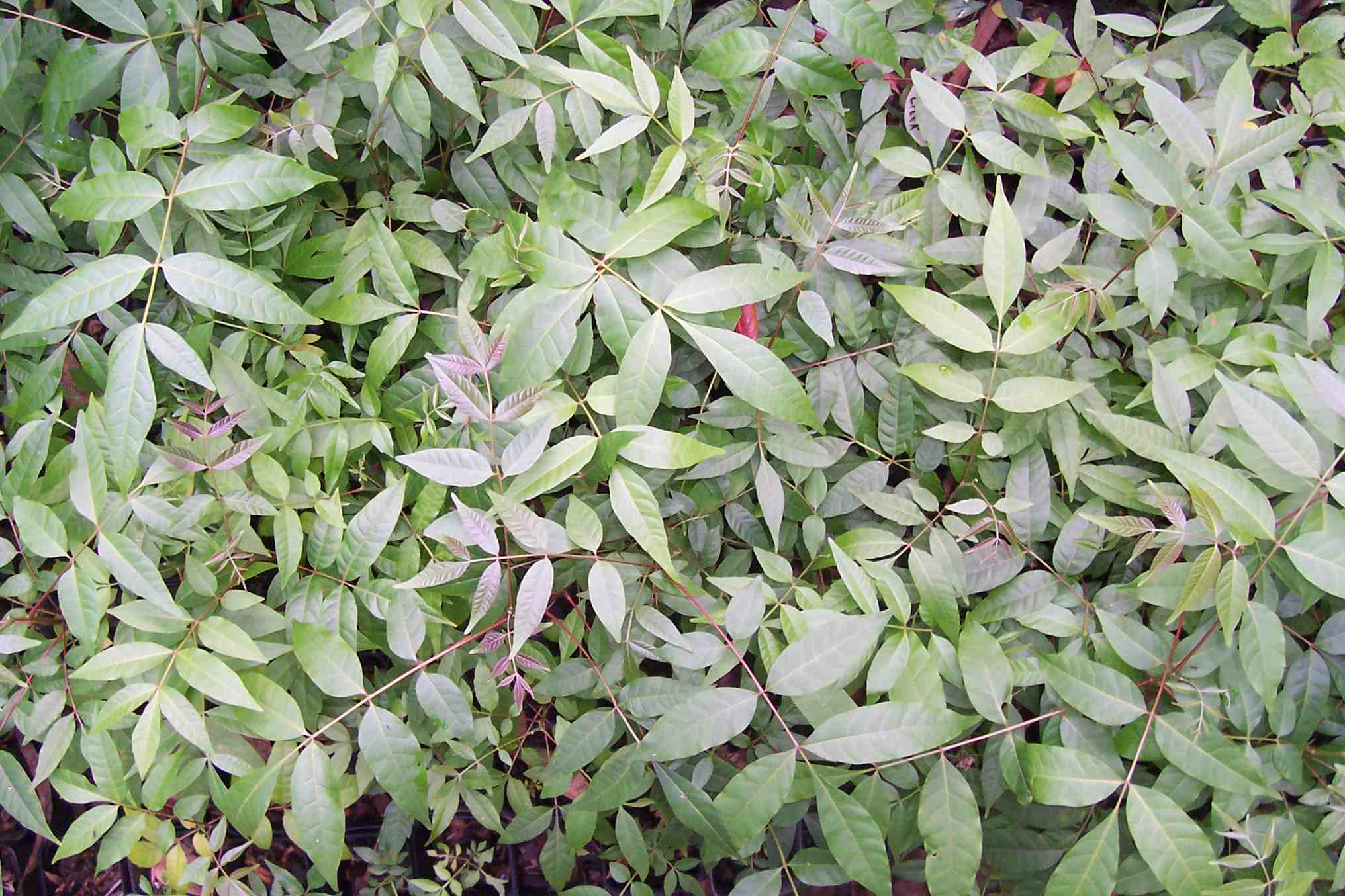
- Toona ciliata seedlings sourced from Cedar Brush Creek
- Interactive map of Cedar Brush Creek
- Country: Australia
- State: New South Wales
- City: Central Coast
- LGA: Central Coast Council
- Location: 24 km (15 mi) NW of Wyong

Government
  - State electorate: Wyong
  - Federal division: Dobell

Population
  - Total: 125 (SAL 2021)
- Postcode: 2259
- Parish: Stowe

Cedar Brush Creek is a suburb of the Central Coast region of New South Wales, Australia, located 24 kilometres (15 mi) upstream from Wyong along the Wyong River. It is part of the Central Coast Council local government area.

The first permanent resident was William Beaven who was also the first person buried at St Barnabas Church Yarramalong.
