= Gunderman =

- Suburb
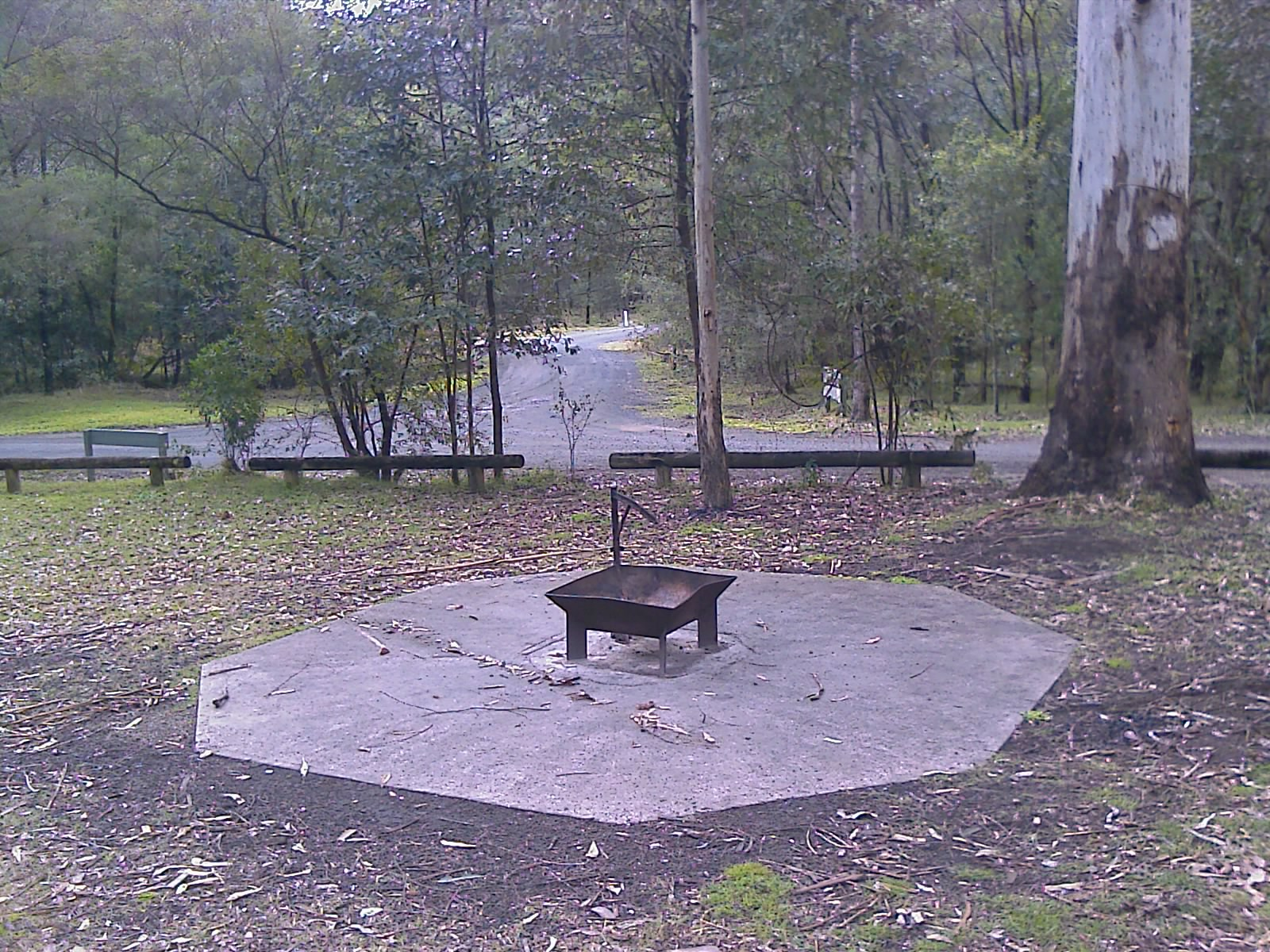

- Interactive map of Gunderman
- Coordinates: 33°24′S 151°05′E
- Country: Australia
- State: New South Wales
- LGA: Central Coast Council
- Location: 18 km (11 mi) SE of Wisemans Ferry; 60 km (37 mi) W of Gosford; 111 km (69 mi) N of Sydney; 60 km (37 mi) N of Hornsby

Government
  - State electorate: Gosford
  - Federal division: Robertson
- Elevation: 14 m (46 ft)

Population
  - Total: 189 (2021 census)
- Postcode: 2775
- Parish: Spencer
Suburbs around Gunderman
Lower Macdonald	Kulnura	Mangrove Mountain
Wisemans Ferry	Gunderman	Mangrove Mountain
Laughtondale	Spencer	Calga

Gunderman is a semi-rural hamlet on the outskirts of Northern Sydney and on the Western outskirts of the Central Coast region of New South Wales, Australia. Gunderman is located on the northern bank of the Hawkesbury River between the historic towns of Wisemans Ferry and Spencer located 111 kilometres north north-west of Sydney. Gunderman is located within the Central Coast Council local government areasharing a Hornsby Shire / Northern Sydney postcode with Wisemans Ferry. It adjoins the Dharug National Park. At the 2021 census, Gunderman had a population of 189 people.

Gunderman is derived from an aboriginal word meaning 'house by the stream'.

Gunderman is accessed by two ferry services crossing the Hawkesbury River from the town of Wisemans Ferry. The eponymous Wisemans Ferry crosses the river to a point down-stream of its confluence with the Macdonald River, connecting with the old Great North Road. It is also accessible via the M1 motorway thru the Somersby and Peats Ridge interchange via Wisemans Ferry Rd inland passing neighbouring towns.

== Heritage listings ==
Gunderman has a number of heritage-listed sites, including:

- Wisemans Ferry Road: Lower Hawkesbury Wesleyan Chapel
