= Mangrove Creek Dam =

- Location of the Mangrove Creek Dam in New South Wales
- Country: Australia
- Location: Central Coast, New South Wales
- Coordinates: 33°12′54″S 151°07′04″E
- Purpose: Water supply
- Status: Operational
- Construction began: 1978
- Opening date: 1982
- Owner: Central Coast Water Corporation

Dam and spillways
- Type of dam: Rock-fill dam
- Impounds: Mangrove Creek
- Height: 80 m (260 ft)
- Length: 380 m (1,250 ft)
- Width (crest): 6 m (20 ft)
- Width (base): 250 m (820 ft)
- Dam volume: 1,340×10^{3} m^{3} (47×10^{6} cu ft)
- Spillway type: Uncontrolled concrete-lined chute
- Spillway capacity: 570 m^{3}/s (20,000 cu ft/s)

Reservoir
- Total capacity: 190,000 ML (150,000 acre⋅ft)
- Catchment area: 101 km^{2} (39 sq mi)
- Surface area: 7 km^{2} (2.7 sq mi)
- Maximum water depth: 65 m (213 ft)
- Website www.centralcoast.nsw.gov.au/residents/roads-and-water/water-supply-services

The Mangrove Creek Dam is a concrete-faced rock-fill embankment dam across the Mangrove Creek, a tributary of the Hawkesbury River, located on the Central Coast of New South Wales, Australia. Constructed between 1978 and 1982, the resultant reservoir is the primary source of potable water supply for residents in the region.

When full, the reservoir has a capacity of 190,000 megalitres (150,000 acre⋅ft) and fed by a catchment area of 101 square kilometres (39 sq mi), is operated by the Central Coast Water Corporation, and supplies approximately 93 per cent of water to 300,000 residents in Central Coast Council.

== Dam and spillway statistics ==
The concrete-faced rock-fill embankment was built due to a rising demand for water from the expanding population on the Central Coast. The dam was built to boost water supply storage and to help provide a more reliable water supply. Mangrove Creek Dam was built using rolled, soft rockfill of sandstones and siltstones. This material was obtained from a quarry located within the storage area. These sandstones and siltstones were crushed and compacted to form the dam embankment. The embankment also contains approximately 100 thousand cubic metres (3.5×10^{6} cu ft) of processed basalt. This material was incorporated into various filters and drains within the embankment to cope with seepage within the embankment and foundations. The concrete face which tapers from 600 millimetres (24 in) at the base to 300 millimetres (12 in) at the crest acts as a seal between the water and the dam embankment. Provision was made to increase the height of the dam wall by 25 metres (82 ft) to a total capacity of 420,000 megalitres (340,000 acre⋅ft) if the need arose in the future.

The dam wall is 80 metres (260 ft) high and 380 metres (1,250 ft) long. The uncontrolled spillway is a concrete lined chute of approximately 240 metres (790 ft) with a width that tapers from 20 to 10 metres (66 to 33 ft), with the capacity to discharge a water flow of 570 cubic metres per second (20,000 cu ft/s) into Mangrove Creek.

Completed in 1989, the Boomerang Creek Tunnel enabled water to be transferred from Mangrove Creek Dam to Wyong River, for extraction at the Wyong River Weir for storage in Mardi Dam. This water was then extracted downstream at Lower Wyong River Weir and pumped for storage in Mardi Dam.

== Catchment ==
The Mangrove Creek Dam was proposed as a large storage dam, not primarily a collection dam. Its catchment area was relatively small and the shape of the valley and its geology enabled the construction of a relatively high wall that stores 190,000 megalitres (150,000 acre⋅ft), reaching a maximum water depth in the reservoir of 65 metres (213 ft). When at full supply, the reservoir has a surface level of approximately 7 square kilometres (2.7 sq mi), generated from the 101-square-kilometre (39 sq mi) catchment area and annual average rainfall of 960 millimetres (38 in).

=== Supply levels ===
Sustained low water conditions, including a 15-year drought, took the level of water to 10.27% of total capacity during February 2007, following an earlier reading of 13.3% during January 2007. Local government officials immediately placed a range of water restrictions on residents and businesses in order to conserve water and ensure ongoing supply to the region's residents and tourism industry. Piping of water from the Hunter River system augmented local water supply.

In 2007, a water plan was established and detailed a program to expand supply and reduce demand to help secure the water supply until 2050.

Between 2010 and 2012, a link was established between the Mangrove Creek Dam and Mardi Dam. This 21-kilometre (13 mi) Mardi-Mangrove Link is made up of two pipelines that enable water to be transferred from the Wyong River and Ourimbah Creek, via Mardi Dam to the large Mangrove Creek Dam for storage, instead of allowing it to flow to the ocean. It is expected that this link will help protect the Central Coast region against future extended periods of below-average rainfall.

In 2022, After days of heavy rainfall Mangrove Creek Dam reached 100% capacity and began spilling over the spillway for the first time since construction of the dam was completed in 1982.

== Access and recreation ==
The dam is a popular day trip destination for both locals and tourists for barbecues and picnics, taking about 45 minutes to reach by car from Gosford. Restrictions apply on accessing the dam and the catchment area in order to protect water quality, protect large areas of bush land and plant and animal habitats, protect threatened plants and animal species, and preserve evidence of Aboriginal occupation.

== See also ==
- List of dams and reservoirs in New South Wales
