= Upper Mangrove =

Coordinates: 33°18′25″S 151°07′34″E

- Suburb
- Interactive map of Upper Mangrove
- Country: Australia
- State: New South Wales
- City: Central Coast
- LGA: Central Coast Council
- Location: 37 km (23 mi) W of Gosford

Government
  - State electorate: Gosford
  - Federal division: Robertson
- Postcode: 2250
- Parish: Mangrove

Upper Mangrove is a suburb of the Central Coast region of New South Wales, Australia, located about 22 kilometres (14 mi) upstream and north of Spencer along Mangrove Creek. It is part of the Central Coast Council local government area.
