= Mangrove Creek, New South Wales =

Coordinates: 33°20′24″S 151°08′35″E

Mangrove Creek Central Coast, New South Wales
- Population: 56 (SAL 2021)
- Postcode(s): 2250
- Location: 29 km (18 mi) NW of Gosford
- LGA(s): Central Coast Council
- Parish: Mangrove
- State electorate(s): Gosford
- Federal division(s): Robertson

Mangrove Creek is a suburb of the Central Coast region of New South Wales, Australia, located about 14 kilometres (9 mi) upstream and north of Spencer along the Mangrove Creek watercourse. It is part of the Central Coast Council local government area.

It derives its name from the waterway, which was first mentioned in 1829 by surveyor William Romaine Govett (1807–1848) in relation to mangroves in the area, which were burnt for ash which was used to make soap.
