= Central Mangrove =

- Suburb
- Coordinates: 33°17′56″S 151°14′6″E
- Country: Australia
- State: New South Wales
- City: Central Coast
- LGA: Central Coast Council
- Location: 81 km (50 mi) NE of Sydney; 22 km (14 mi) NNW of Gosford

Government
  - State electorates: Gosford; Wyong
  - Federal division: Robertson
- Elevation: 334 m (1,096 ft)

Population
  - Total: 264 (2016 census)
- Postcode: 2250
- Parish: Popran
Suburbs around Central Mangrove
Kulnura	Kulnura	Ourimbah
Mangrove Mountain	Central Mangrove	Palm Grove
Mangrove Mountain	Peats Ridge	Somersby

Central Mangrove is a locality within the Central Coast region of New South Wales, Australia. It is about 81 kilometres (50 mi) north of Sydney. The locality is located within the Central Coast Council local government area.

The town is situated at the crossroads of Wisemans Ferry Road and George Downes Drive, and contains a primary school, a 9-hole golf course, country club and health centre.
