= Wyong River =

Coordinates: 33°15′S 151°20′E

Wyong Wyong Creek
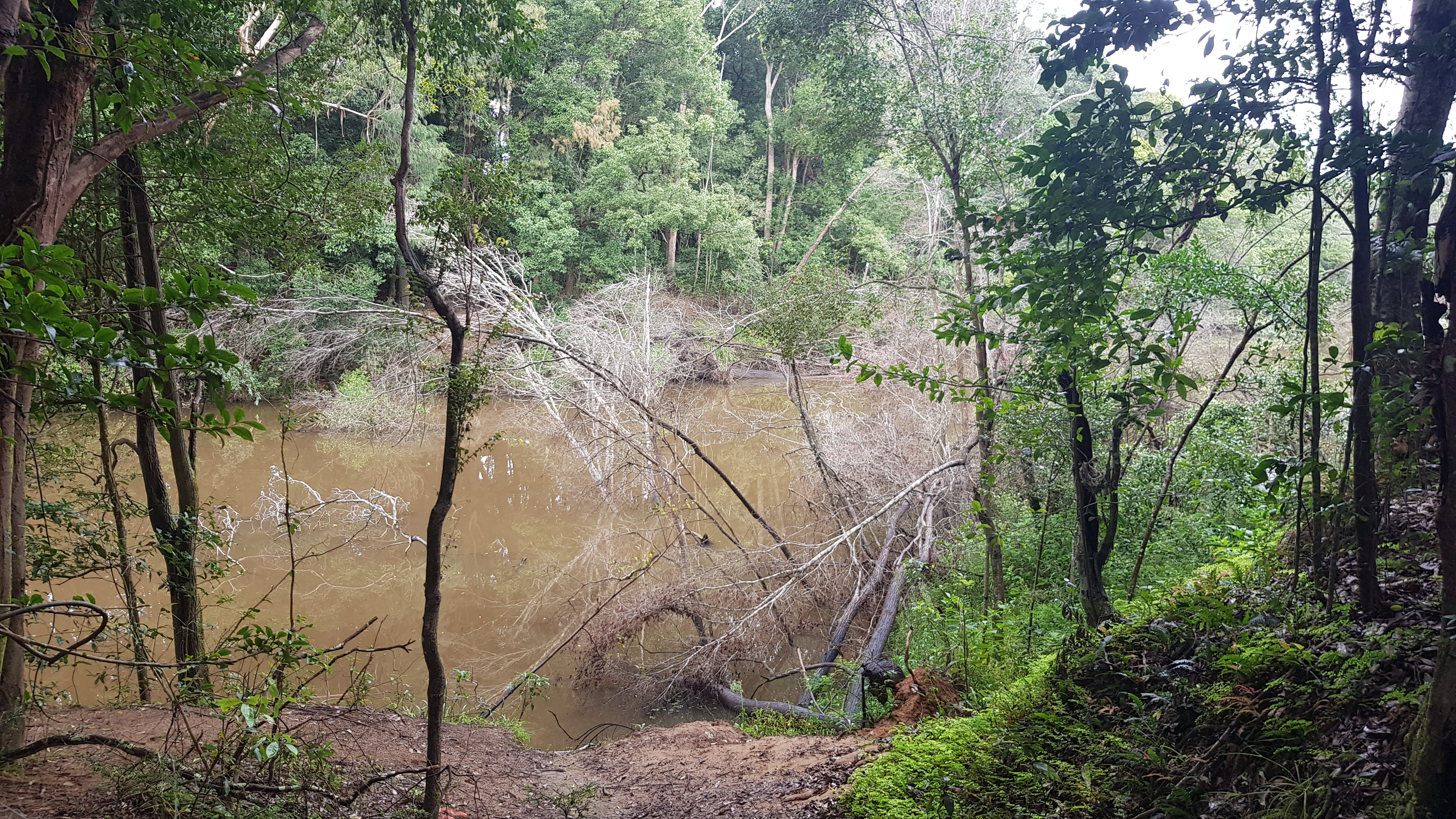
- Wyong River at Mardi, 2023

Location
- Country: Australia
- State: New South Wales
- Region: Central Coast
- Local government areas: Central Coast Council
- City: Wyong

Physical characteristics
- Source: Watagan Mountains
  - location: Martinsville
  - elevation: 118 m (387 ft)
- Mouth: Tuggerah Lake
  - location: Tacoma
  - elevation: 0 m (0 ft)
- Length: 57.5 km (35.7 mi)

Basin features
- Tributaries
  - left: Jilliby Jilliby Creek
  - right: Cedar Brush Creek, Ourimbah Creek
- Nature reserve: Jilliby State Conservation Area

The Wyong River is a perennial river that is located in the Central Coast region of New South Wales, Australia.

== Course and features ==
The Wyong River rises below Watagan Mountains west of Martinsville, and flows generally south and southeast, joined by three minor tributaries, before reaching its river mouth within Tuggerah Lake, near Tacoma. The river descends 119 metres (390 ft) over its 57.5-kilometre (35.7 mi) course.

The merged flows of the Wyong River together with Tuggerah Lake reaches the Tasman Sea of the South Pacific Ocean at The Entrance.

The Pacific Motorway crosses the river west of Wyong.

== See also ==
- Budgewoi Lake
- List of rivers of Australia
- List of rivers of New South Wales (L–Z)
- Rivers of New South Wales
