= Dharug National Park =

National park in Australia

- IUCN category II (national park)
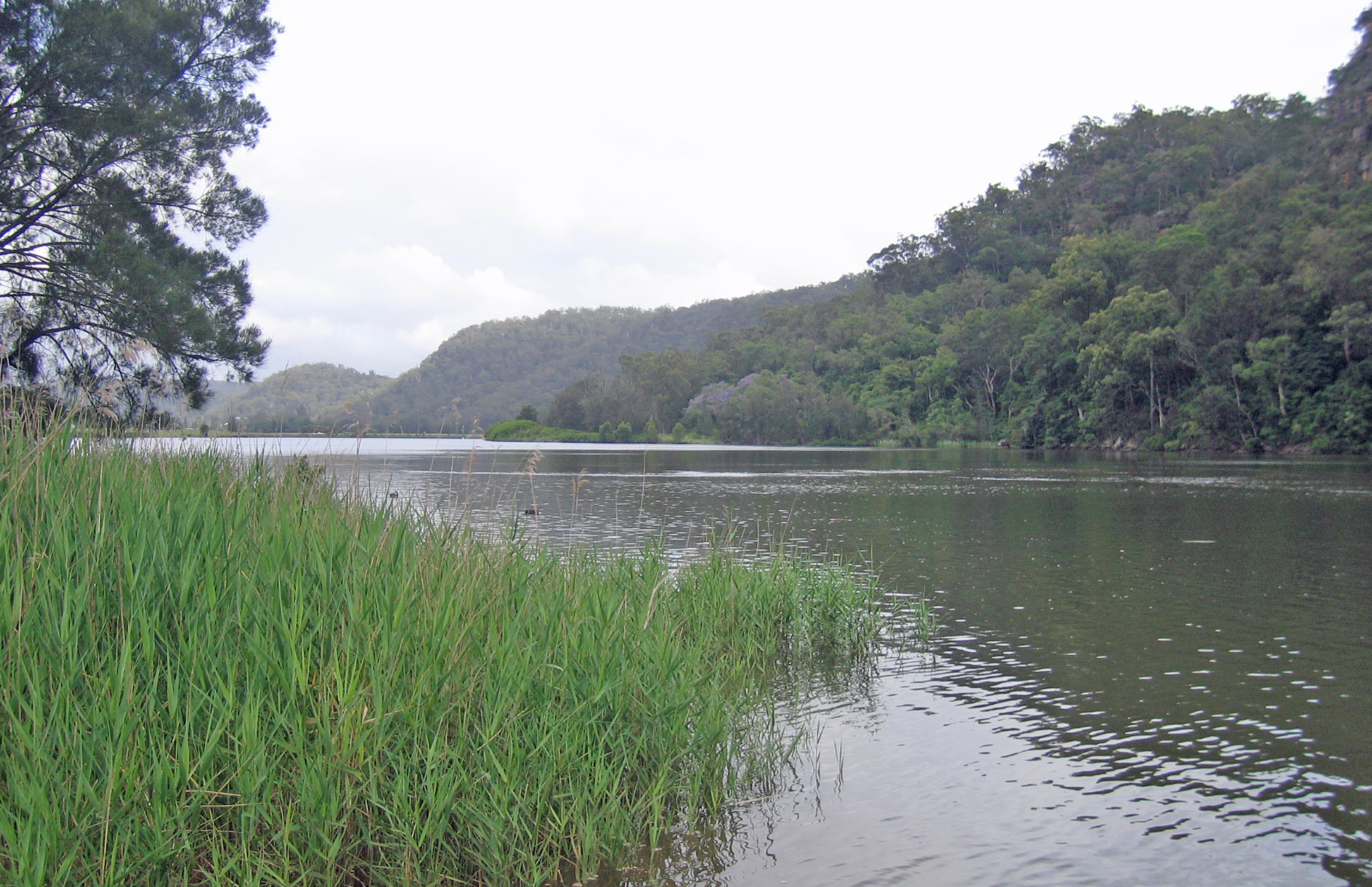
- A view from Settlers Road, located adjacent to the national park, looking across the Hawkesbury River.
- Location: New South Wales
- Nearest city: Gosford
- Area: 148.50 km^{2} (57.34 sq mi)
- Established: 1 October 1967
- Governing body: NSW National Parks & Wildlife Service
- Website: Official website

The Dharug National Park is a protected national park in the Central Coast region of New South Wales, in eastern Australia. The 14,850-hectare (36,700-acre) national park is situated approximately 81 kilometres (50 mi) north of the Sydney and 25 kilometres (16 mi) west of Gosford.

The park contains the Great North Road, one of the eleven UNESCO World Heritage-listed Australian Convict Sites. These eleven sites present the story of the forced migration of convicts and the ideas and practices of punishment and reform of criminals during this time. The relatively intact Devine's Hill and Finch's Line sections of the Old Great North Road, approximately 16 kilometres (9.9 mi) long and contained within the national park, were inscribed on the World Heritage register in July 2010.

== Location and features ==
The park is bounded by the Yengo National Park, the Wisemans Ferry and Old Great North Roads, McPherson State Forest, private land along Mangrove Creek and the townships of Gunderman and Spencer. The Popran National Park is located on the eastern bank of Mangrove Creek and the Marramarra National Park is located on the southern shore of the Hawkesbury River; making the Dharug National Park, when combined with adjoining parks, a virtually contiguous area of protected national park stretching from Jerrys Plains in the Hunter Region in the north to Pennant Hills in the Hills District in the south.

The Dharug National Park lies within the Sydney Basin, a major structural unit of Permian and Triassic age (270-180 million years ago) consisting almost entirely of horizontally bedded sedimentary rocks. The park lies on the northern margin of the Hornsby Plateau; a subdivision of the Sydney Basin.

== Fauna ==
The park is full of birds and animals that you can meet during the tour. You will be greeted by satin bowerbirds, gang-gang cockatoos and green catbirds.

== Etymology ==
The park derives its name from the indigenous Darug people, south of the Hawkesbury River, who are not the traditional custodians of the area. It is incorrectly named on the land of the traditional Darkinjung custodians.

== See also ==
- Protected areas of New South Wales
