= Wendoree Park =

- Suburb
- Interactive map of Wendoree Park
- Coordinates: 33.449°S 151.151°E
- Country: Australia
- State: New South Wales
- City: Central Coast
- LGA: Central Coast Council
- Location: 58 km (36 mi) N of Sydney; 24 km (15 mi) W of Gosford

Government
  - State electorate: Gosford
  - Federal division: Robertson
- Elevation: 5 m (16 ft)

Population
  - Total: 131 (SAL 2021)
- Postcode: 2250
- Parish: Cowan
Suburbs around Wendoree Park
	Spencer
Spencer	Wendoree Park	Mount White
	Marlow

Wendoree Park is a Community of the Central Coast region of New South Wales, Australia, located in a remote region on the east bank of Mangrove Creek and on the north bank of the Hawkesbury River 58 kilometres (36 mi) north of Sydney. It is part of the Central Coast Council local government area.

The community was originally conceived as a "dream village" by Athol Leeming Spring when he purchased property there around the 1940s/1950s. He gave the site the name "Wendoree Park" and hoped to build a village there of 250 self-contained cottages, overlooking Spencer.

Wendoree Park was historically made up of weekenders due to its remote, rural location on the east bank of Mangrove Creek. Recently, Wendoree Park, a very close nit community has shifted from being made up of primarily weekenders to now permanent residence. Wendoree Park is now considered quite a 'back water' community in the region along with surrounding communities.

== Climate ==
=== Overview ===
Wendoree Park, located in the Central Coast region of New South Wales, experiences a Subtropical Climate. This area features warm, humid summers and mild, relatively cool winters, alongside moderate-to-high rainfall year-round.

=== Thunderstorm Activity ===
Wendoree Park experiences a climate atypical of the broader Central Coast region, with meteorological conditions more consistent with areas considerably further north along the New South Wales coast. The area is particularly noted for its above-average summertime thunderstorm activity, with isolated severe thunderstorms occurring with notable regularity during the afternoon and evening hours throughout the summer months.

These storms are frequently characterised by intense electrical activity, producing significant lightning displays, damaging wind gusts, heavy precipitation, and hail. The nocturnal lightning events in particular have become a defining feature of the region.

==== Contributing Factors ====
The heightened storm activity at Wendoree Park is attributed to a confluence of several localised geographic and environmental factors:

- Evaporative moisture from warm, shallow upstream river systems
- Extensive mangrove forests, which contribute additional atmospheric humidity through transpiration
- Above-average surface temperatures during the summer months, promoting strong convective uplift
- Iron-rich mountainous terrain, which is believed to influence localised storm initiation and intensification

== Waterways ==
While the Hawkesbury River is relatively deep, Mangrove Creek is extremely shallow and requires a deep level of local knowledge to navigate the river safely. The people of Wendoree Park seem to be a part of their environment and have a deep sense of understanding for local fishing and crabbing knowledge up Mangrove Creek. One lucky enough to be a part and accepted into a local community around this region will know how reliant they are on the people and vast environment around them. The deep level of local knowledge for waterways, bushland, and wildlife is something that cannot be found anywhere else in Northern NSW and around Greater Sydney. The people's way of life in one of Australia's most diverse inland waterways is truly incredible.
