= Mangrove Mountain =

Suburb in Australia

Coordinates: 33°17′56″S 151°11′35″E

- Suburb
- Interactive map of Mangrove Mountain
- Country: Australia
- State: New South Wales
- City: Central Coast
- LGA: Central Coast Council
- Location: 34 km (21 mi) W of Gosford; 47 km (29 mi) NE of Wisemans Ferry; 96 km (60 mi) N of Sydney

Government
  - State electorate: Gosford
  - Federal division: Robertson

Area
  - Total: 76.9 km^{2} (29.7 sq mi)
- Elevation: 307 m (1,007 ft)

Population
  - Total: 736 (SAL 2021)
  - Density: 9.57/km^{2} (24.8/sq mi)
- Postcode: 2250
- Parish: Kooree
Suburbs around Mangrove Mountain
	Kulnura
Upper Mangrove	Mangrove Mountain	Central Mangrove
Lower Mangrove	Greengrove	Glenworth Valley

Mangrove Mountain is a suburb of the Central Coast region of New South Wales, Australia, located about 14 kilometres (9 mi) upstream and north of Spencer along Mangrove Creek.

== Culture ==
The Central Coast Soaring Club is located near Mangrove Mountain. The club conducts glider-flying training and air experience flights over the Central Coast.

The area is home to a Greek Orthodox monastery, Pantanassa, and to Mangrove Mountain Union Church. Also within the region is an ashram. It is also home to Mangrove Mountain Memorial Golf Club, a 10-hole, 18 tee golf course, currently in development.

== Climate ==
Climate data for Mangrove Mountain
Month	Jan	Feb	Mar	Apr	May	Jun	Jul	Aug	Sep	Oct	Nov	Dec	Year
Record high °C (°F)	44.0 (111.2)	44.4 (111.9)	38.7 (101.7)	33.1 (91.6)	27.1 (80.8)	23.6 (74.5)	25.2 (77.4)	28.7 (83.7)	34.4 (93.9)	35.8 (96.4)	42.1 (107.8)	42.4 (108.3)	44.4 (111.9)
Mean daily maximum °C (°F)	27.5 (81.5)	26.7 (80.1)	24.9 (76.8)	22.0 (71.6)	18.9 (66.0)	16.1 (61.0)	15.8 (60.4)	17.7 (63.9)	20.8 (69.4)	23.0 (73.4)	24.6 (76.3)	26.6 (79.9)	22.0 (71.6)
Mean daily minimum °C (°F)	16.9 (62.4)	16.8 (62.2)	15.3 (59.5)	12.0 (53.6)	8.9 (48.0)	7.0 (44.6)	5.9 (42.6)	6.5 (43.7)	9.1 (48.4)	11.4 (52.5)	13.6 (56.5)	15.4 (59.7)	11.6 (52.9)
Record low °C (°F)	9.5 (49.1)	9.0 (48.2)	7.7 (45.9)	2.8 (37.0)	−0.3 (31.5)	−1.7 (28.9)	−1.0 (30.2)	−0.8 (30.6)	0.5 (32.9)	3.1 (37.6)	3.7 (38.7)	6.6 (43.9)	−1.7 (28.9)
Average precipitation mm (inches)	109.6 (4.31)	141.9 (5.59)	151.8 (5.98)	85.8 (3.38)	78.3 (3.08)	103.6 (4.08)	62.5 (2.46)	60.2 (2.37)	66.0 (2.60)	79.5 (3.13)	94.7 (3.73)	85.0 (3.35)	1,113.4 (43.83)
Average precipitation days	13.7	13.9	14.7	13.1	13.0	13.4	11.1	8.6	9.3	11.5	13.0	12.1	147.4
Average relative humidity (%)	61	64	62	62	64	64	58	49	49	53	58	57	58
