= Kulnura =

- Suburb
- Interactive map of Kulnura
- Coordinates: 33°13′55″S 151°13′5″E
- Country: Australia
- State: New South Wales
- City: Central Coast
- LGA: Central Coast Council
- Location: 30 km (19 mi) NNW of Gosford; 26 km (16 mi) WNW of Wyong; 73 km (45 mi) S of Cessnock; 87 km (54 mi) N of Sydney

Government
  - State electorates: Wyong; Gosford
  - Federal division: Dobell
- Elevation: 345 m (1,132 ft)

Population
  - Total: 584 (2011 census)
- Postcode: 2250
- Parish: Kooree
- Mean max temp: 21.2 °C (70.2 °F)
- Mean min temp: 11.2 °C (52.2 °F)
- Annual rainfall: 1,205.4 mm (47.46 in)

Kulnura (/kʌlˈnjʊərə/) is a rural suburb of the Central Coast region of New South Wales, Australia. It is located north of Mangrove Mountain along the George Downes Drive. Kulnura is located within the Central Coast Council local government area.

Kulnura's name is an Aboriginal word meaning "in sight of the sea" or "up in the clouds", it was named in 1914 by a meeting of the early pioneers Messrs Archibold, Collins, Gatley, Penn, Young, Williams and Gibson. Its population of approximately 600 people rely mostly on the town's fruit and cattle industries for income, however many commute to regional hubs such as Gosford and Wyong and other areas of the Central Coast. It is also home to the biggest water supply catchment area on the Central Coast, Mangrove Creek Dam which has a capacity of 190 000 ML.

== District ==
Kulnura extends from the intersection of Bloodtree Road and George Downes Drive in the south, to the Great Northern Road in the north, to include the Mangrove Creek reservoir in the west, to down Bumble Hill Road in the east and to Red Hill Road in the southeast.

Kulnura Public School is situated at 9 Williams Road.

== Festival ==
Every year Kulnura is host to the Bloodtree Festival, which is a celebration of life in the Mangrove Mountain area.
