= Spencer, New South Wales =

Coordinates: 33°27′25″S 151°08′35″E

Spencer
- Suburb
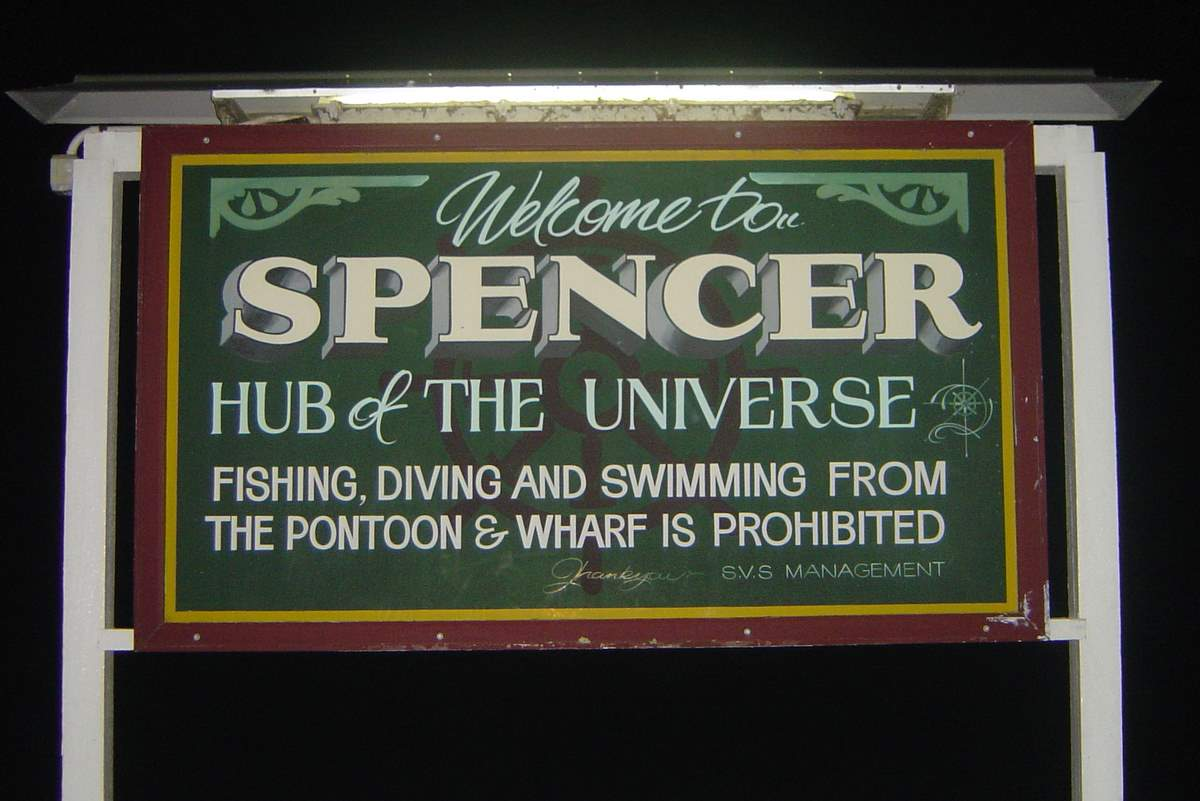
- Spencer Welcome Sign
- Interactive map of Spencer
- Country: Australia
- State: New South Wales
- City: Central Coast
- LGA: Central Coast Council
- Location: 50 km (31 mi) W of Gosford; 107 km (66 mi) N of Sydney; 25 km (16 mi) SE of Wisemans Ferry

Government
  - State electorate: Gosford
  - Federal division: Robertson
- Elevation: 8 m (26 ft)

Population
  - Total: 288 (2021 census)
- Postcode: 2775
- Parish: Spencer
Suburbs around Spencer
Dharug National Park	Lower Mangrove	Glenworth Valley
Gunderman	Spencer	Mount White
Canoelands	Marramarra National Park	Wendoree Park

Spencer is a suburb of the Central Coast region of New South Wales, Australia. It is located on the north bank of the Hawkesbury River, just upstream of that river's confluence with Mangrove Creek. Spencer is part of the Central Coast Council local government area.

== Geography ==
Spencer is bound by the Hawkesbury River to the south and west and Mangrove Creek to the east. Despite the relatively short distance from the Pacific Motorway as the crow flies, a boat across Mangrove Creek significantly reduces the distance to be traveled.

== History ==
Early British explorers stepped onto a "marshy outcrop" here during their exploration of the East Coast of Australia, which is commemorated by a monument near the children's playground and public toilet.

Spencer is a township that is presumed to be named for the parish in which it is situated. Originally, the area was known as Fernleigh. The true name origin of Spencer is unclear, but it is believed to be named after George John Spencer, 2nd Earl Spencer (1758–1834), who became First Lord of the Admiralty in 1794 and held the position until 1810. He was a mentor of Lord Nelson and oversaw many of the Royal Navy's victories over the French.

== Economy ==
The economy is rural, and farming and fishing are the area's main sources of income. Tourism is also growing and based around the history and the scenery of the area.
