= Central Coast Council (New South Wales) =

- Local government area
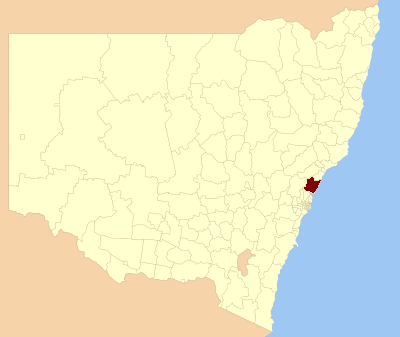
- Location in New South Wales

- Interactive map of Central Coast Council
- Coordinates: 33°25′S 151°20′E
- Country: Australia
- State: New South Wales
- Region: Central Coast
- Established: 12 May 2016
- Council seat: Gosford and Wyong

Government
  - Mayor: Lawrie McKinna (Independent)
  - State electorates: Gosford; Swansea; Terrigal; The Entrance; Wyong
  - Federal divisions: Dobell; Robertson; Shortland

Area
  - Total: 1,681 km^{2} (649 sq mi)

Population
  - Total: 346,596 (2021 census)
  - Density: 206.18/km^{2} (534.02/sq mi)
- Time zone: UTC+10 (AEST)
  - Summer (DST): UTC+11 (AEDT)
- Website: Central Coast Council
LGAs around Central Coast Council
Cessnock	Lake Macquarie	Tasman Sea
Hawkesbury	Central Coast Council	Tasman Sea
The Hills & Hornsby	Northern Beaches	Tasman Sea

The Central Coast Council is a local government area in the Central Coast region of New South Wales, Australia. It is adjacent to the Pacific Highway, Central Coast Highway, the Northern railway line and the Pacific Ocean. The council was formed on 12 May 2016 following the merger of the City of Gosford and Wyong Shire Councils.

The council comprises an area of 1,681 square kilometres (649 sq mi) and is bounded to the east by the Tasman Sea, to the south by Broken Bay and the Hawkesbury River, and to the west by the Yengo National Park northwards to Bucketty before heading eastward along George Downes Drive, encompassing the Olney State Forest and crossing the Pacific Motorway, meeting the southern edge of Lake Macquarie at Mannering Park and eventually reaching the coast north of Moonee. The Central Coast Council has over 40 beaches and over 90 kilometres (56 mi) of coastline. As at the 2021 census the council area had an estimated population of 346,596. The Central Coast Council has two administrative chambers that is located in Gosford and Wyong.

The mayor of the Central Coast Council is Lawrie McKinna who is part of the Independent Team Central Coast political party since 8 October 2024, and the Deputy Mayor of the council is Douglas Eaton, an independent, since 8 October 2024.

== Towns, suburbs and localities ==
The local government area includes a moderately densely populated coastal strip that extends from the Hawkesbury River in the south and is bounded by the Watagan Mountains to the west and north to Lake Macquarie and the Pacific Ocean to the east. It is an extensive sparsely populated region to the west of the Pacific Highway that is largely native bush.

The towns and villages located within Central Coast Council include:

- Alison
- Avoca Beach
- Bar Point
- Bateau Bay
- Bensville
- Berkeley Vale
- Blackwall
- Blue Bay
- Blue Haven
- Booker Bay
- Bouddi
- Box Head
- Budgewoi
- Budgewoi Peninsula
- Buff Point
- Bushells Ridge
- Calga
- Canton Beach
- Cedar Brush Creek
- Central Mangrove
- Chain Valley Bay
- Charmhaven
- Cheero Point
- Chittaway Bay
- Chittaway Point
- Cogra Bay
- Colongra
- Copacabana
- Crangan Bay (Southern and North-western part)
- Daleys Point
- Davistown
- Dooralong
- Doyalson
- Doyalson North
- Durren Durren
- East Gosford
- Empire Bay
- Erina
- Erina Heights
- Ettalong Beach
- Forresters Beach
- Fountaindale
- Frazer Park
- Glenning Valley
- Glenworth Valley
- Gorokan
- Gosford
- Green Point
- Greengrove
- Gunderman
- Gwandalan
- Halekulani
- Halloran
- Hamlyn Terrace
- Hardys Bay
- Holgate
- Horsfield Bay
- Jilliby
- Kangy Angy
- Kanwal
- Kariong
- Kiar
- Killarney Vale
- Killcare
- Killcare Heights
- Kincumber
- Kincumber South
- Kingfisher Shores
- Koolewong
- Kulnura
- Lake Haven
- Lake Munmorah
- Lemon Tree
- Little Jilliby
- Lisarow
- Little Wobby
- Long Jetty
- Lower Mangrove
- MacMasters Beach
- Magenta
- Mangrove Creek
- Mangrove Mountain
- Mannering Park
- Mardi
- Marlow
- Matcham
- Moonee (Southern part)
- Mooney Mooney
- Mooney Mooney Creek
- Mount Elliot
- Mount White
- Narara
- Niagara Park
- Norah Head
- Noraville
- North Avoca
- North Gosford
- Ourimbah
- Palm Grove
- Palmdale
- Patonga
- Pearl Beach
- Peats Ridge
- Phegans Bay
- Picketts Valley
- Point Clare
- Point Frederick
- Point Wolstoncroft
- Pretty Beach
- Ravensdale
- Rocky Point
- St Huberts Island
- San Remo
- Saratoga
- Shelly Beach
- Somersby
- Spencer
- Springfield
- Summerland Point
- Tacoma
- Tacoma South
- Tascott
- Ten Mile Hollow (Eastern part)
- Terrigal
- The Entrance
- The Entrance North
- Toowoon Bay
- Toukley
- Tuggerah
- Tuggerawong
- Tumbi Umbi
- Umina Beach
- Upper Mangrove
- Wadalba
- Wagstaffe
- Wallarah
- Wamberal
- Warnervale
- Watanobbi
- Wendoree Park
- West Gosford
- Wisemans Ferry (North-eastern part)
- Wondabyne
- Woongarrah
- Woy Woy
- Woy Woy Bay
- Wyee (Southern part)
- Wyoming
- Wyong
- Wyong Creek
- Wyongah
- Yarramalong
- Yattalunga

== Demographics ==
At the 2021 census the population of the Central Coast local government area was 346,596. The median income for the Central Coast Council Local Government Area (LGA) was lower than the nation compared to $1,746 nationally, and the state at $1,829 and $1,507 in this LGA.

Selected historical census data for Central Coast local government area
Census year		2016	2021
Population	Estimated residents on census night	327,736	346,596
Population	LGA rank in terms of size within New South Wales	3rd	
Population	% of New South Wales population		
Population	% of Australian population		
Cultural and language diversity			
Ancestry, top responses	English	31.3%	▲42.6%
Ancestry, top responses	Australian	30.2%	▲39.9%
Ancestry, top responses	Irish	9.3%	▲12.0%
Ancestry, top responses	Scottish	7.5%	▲10.5%
Ancestry, top responses	German	2.5%	-
Ancestry, top responses	Australian Aboriginal	4.7%	4.7%
Language, top responses (other than English)	Spanish	0.5%	0.5%
Language, top responses (other than English)	Mandarin	0.5%	▲0.6%
Language, top responses (other than English)	Italian	0.4%	▼0.3%
Language, top responses (other than English)	German	0.3%	-
Language, top responses (other than English)	Cantonese	0.3%	0.3%
Language, top responses (other than English)	Tagalog	-	0.3%
Religious affiliation			
Religious affiliation, top responses	No religion	27.6%	▲39.4%
Religious affiliation, top responses	Catholic	24.7%	▼21.7%
Religious affiliation, top responses	Anglican	22.5%	▼16.8%
Religious affiliation, top responses	Not Stated	8.2%	▼6.1%
Religious affiliation, top responses	Uniting Church	3.2%	▼2.4%
Median weekly incomes			
Personal income	Median weekly personal income	$600	▲$727
Family income	Median weekly family income	$1,560	▲$1,954
Household income	Median weekly household income	$1,258	▲$1,507

== Council ==
A map of the five wards, showing party representation as of the 2017 local elections (note that the council was not up for election in 2021)

The Council comprises fifteen Councillors elected proportionally, with three Councillors elected in five wards. Councillors are elected for a fixed four-year term of office, with the first term to last for three years. The Mayor is elected by Councillors for a period of two years, the Deputy Mayor is elected for one year. On 30 October 2020, the Minister for Local Government, Shelley Hancock announced the suspension of the elected Council and the appointment of Dick Persson as the new interim Administrator of Central Coast Council for an initial period of three months. On 21 January 2021, Hancock announced the extension of Persson's term for an additional three months to 29 April 2021, which was later extended to May 2021. The Council meets fortnightly, with meetings held at the Wyong Civic Centre.

=== Mayors and Deputy Mayors ===
Mayors

No.	Portrait	Mayor	Party	Term start	Term end	Notes	Deputy Mayor
1		Ian Reynolds (Administrator)		12 May 2016	26 September 2017		
2		Jane Smith	Independent	26 September 2017	23 September 2019		Chris Holstein
3		Lisa Matthews	Labour	23 September 2019	30 October 2020		Jane Smith
4		Dick Persson AM (Administrator)		30 October 2020	31 May 2021	Administrator of Warringah Council (2003–2008), Port Macquarie-Hastings Council (2008–2009) and Northern Beaches Council (2016–2017)	
5		Rik Hart (Administrator)		31 May 2021	14 September 2024	Acting CEO of the Council prior to Administrator role (3 November 2020 – 12 April 2021)	
6		Lawrie McKinna	Independent	8 October 2024	incumbent	Mayor of Gosford City Council (2012–2016)	Douglas Eaton

Deputy Mayors

No.	Portrait	Deputy Mayor	Party	Term start	Term end	Notes	Mayor
1		Chris Holstein	Independent	26 September 2017	23 September 2019	Mayor of Gosford City Council (2002–2010)	Jane Smith
2		Jane Smith	Independent	23 September 2019	30 October 2020	Mayor of the Council prior to Deputy Mayor role (26 September 2017 – 23 September 2019)	Lisa Matthews
3		Douglas Eaton	Independent Liberal	8 October 2024	incumbent	Mayor of Wyong Shire Council (2012–2016)	Lawrie McKinna

=== General Manager/CEO ===
No.	Portrait	General Manager/CEO	Term start	Term end	Notes
1		Rob Noble	12 May 2016	20 September 2017	Acting General Manager of Wyong Shire Council (2015–2016)
2		Brian Bell	20 September 2017	2 February 2018	General Manager of Lake Macquarie City Council (2006–2017)
3		Brian Glendenning (Acting)	2 February 2018	2 July 2018	
4		Gary Murphy	2 July 2018	30 November 2020	General Manager of Lismore City Council (2011–2018)
5		Rik Hart (Acting)	30 November 2020	12 April 2021	
6		David Farmer	12 April	incumbent	

=== Current composition ===
The most recent election was held on 14 September 2024. The makeup of the council, is as follows:

Party	Councillors
Labor	5
Independent	5
Liberal	4
Independent Liberal	1
Total	15

Ward	Councillor	Party	Notes
Budgewoi Ward	Helen Crowley	Labor	
Budgewoi Ward	Douglas Eaton	Independent Liberal	Previously Mayor of Wyong Shire Council (1995–1996, 2010–2011, 2012–2016)
Budgewoi Ward	John Mouland	Independent	
Gosford East Ward	Lawrie McKinna	Independent	Previously Mayor of Gosford City Council (2012–2016)
Gosford East Ward	Sharon Walsh	Labor	
Gosford East Ward	Jared Wright	Liberal	
Gosford West Ward	Trent McWaide	Liberal	
Gosford West Ward	Belinda Neal	Labor	Previously Gosford City Council Councillor (1992–1994), Senator for NSW (1994–1998), federal member for Robertson (2007–2010)
Gosford West Ward	Jane Smith	Independent	Previously Mayor (2017–2019)
The Entrance Ward	Margot Castles	Labor	
The Entrance Ward	Rachel Stanton	Liberal	
The Entrance Ward	Corinne Lamont	Independent	
Wyong Ward	John McNamara	Liberal	Previously Wyong Shire Council Councillor (2008–2012)
Wyong Ward	Kyle Macgreggor	Labor	
Wyong Ward	Kyla Daniels	Independent	

== Election results ==
=== 2024 ===
2024 New South Wales local elections: Central Coast
Party	Votes	%	Swing	Seats	Change
Labor	60,882	31.19	+1.17	5	▼1
Liberal	47,232	24.20	-0.50	4	Steady
Team Central Coast	38,867	19.91	+19.91	3	▲3
Independent Liberal	7,364	3.77	+3.77	1	▲1
Central Coast NEW Independents	4,744	2.43	-7.97	1	▲1
Greens	6,029	3.09	-4.71	0	Steady
Ratepayers Choice Central Coast	4,239	2.17	+2.17	0	Steady
Animal Justice	4,032	2.06	+2.06	0	Steady
Central Coast Heart	3,799	1.95	+1.95	0	Steady
Independent One Nation	757	0.39	+0.39	0	Steady
Independent	12,946	6.63	-10.37	1	▼2
Formal votes	195,196	91.53	-0.74		
Informal votes	18,058	8.47	+0.74		
Total	213,254	100		15	
Registered voters / turnout	260,408	81.89	+6.29		

=== 2017 ===
2017 New South Wales local elections: Central Coast
Party	Votes	%	Swing	Seats	Change
Labor	57,265	30.2	+7.0	6	▲1
Liberal	46,751	24.7	−6.5	4	▼2
Independents	32,279	17.0	−12.6	3	▼3
Central Coast NEW Independents	19,774	10.4	+10.4	2	▲2
Greens	14,834	7.8	−1.6	0	▼1
Save Tuggerah Lakes	10,986	5.8	−0.8	0	▼2
Fighting for the Forgotten North	4,012	2.1		0	
Next Generation Independents	2,789	1.5		0	
Animal Justice	544	0.3	+0.3	0	Steady
Sustainable Development	407	0.2	+0.2	0	Steady
Formal votes	189,641	92.3			
Informal votes	15,893	7.7			
Total	205,534	100		15	
Registered voters / turnout	250,818	75.6			

== Past councillors ==
=== Budgewoi Ward ===
Year	Councillor	Party	Councillor	Party	Councillor	Party
2017	Doug Vincent	Labor	Garry Whitaker	Labor	Greg Best	Independent
2022	Council dismissed					
2024	TBC					

=== Gosford East Ward ===
Year	Councillor	Party	Councillor	Party	Councillor	Party
2017	Rebecca Gale-Collins	Liberal	Jeff Sundstrom	Labor	Jane Smith	NEW Independents
2020	Vacant		Jeff Sundstrom	Labor	Jane Smith	NEW Independents
2022	Council dismissed					
2024	TBC					

=== Gosford West Ward ===
Year	Councillor	Party	Councillor	Party	Councillor	Party
2017	Richard Mehrtens	Labor	Troy Marquart	Liberal	Chris Holstein	Independent
2020	Richard Mehrtens	Labor	Vacant		Chris Holstein	Independent
2022	Council dismissed					
2024	TBC					

=== The Entrance Ward ===
Year	Councillor	Party	Councillor	Party	Councillor	Party
2017	Lisa Matthews	Labor	Jilly Pilon	Liberal	Bruce McLachlan	Independent
2022	Council dismissed					
2024	TBC					

=== Wyong Ward ===
Year	Councillor	Party	Councillor	Party	Councillor	Party
2017	Kyle MacGregor	Labor	Louise Greenaway	NEW Independents	Chris Burke	Liberal
2022	Council dismissed					
2024	TBC					

== History ==
=== Early history ===
The traditional Aboriginal inhabitants of the lands now known as the Brisbane Water were the Guringai people of the Eora nation. The Darkingung people occupied large areas inland west towards Rylstone, and north to Cessnock and Wollombi.

In 1811, the Governor of New South Wales, Lachlan Macquarie, gave the first land grant in the region to William Nash, a former marine of the First Fleet. No further grants were made in the area until 1821. In 1839 Governor Sir George Gipps named the town of Gosford after his friend, The Earl of Gosford. In 1840, the Brisbane Water Police District was proclaimed covering the area from the Hawkesbury River to Lake Macquarie and which administered local government under the control of magistrates. In 1843, the Brisbane Water District Council was proclaimed on the same boundaries as the Police District, and replaced the appointed magistrates with an elected council as part of an early attempt to establish local government administration throughout the colony. This experiment in local government was not very successful, with much public opposition focused on the issue of increased taxation, and a lack of oversight and faulty administration led to the collapse of many of these District Councils. The Brisbane Water District Council had ceased to exist by 1855, and the NSW Parliament passed the Municipalities Act in 1858, which allowed for the creation of Municipalities and Boroughs if a petition of as few as 50 signatures was presented to the government. However, no petition was ever sent from the residents of Brisbane Water to the government under this act, and local matters reverted to the police magistrates for determination.

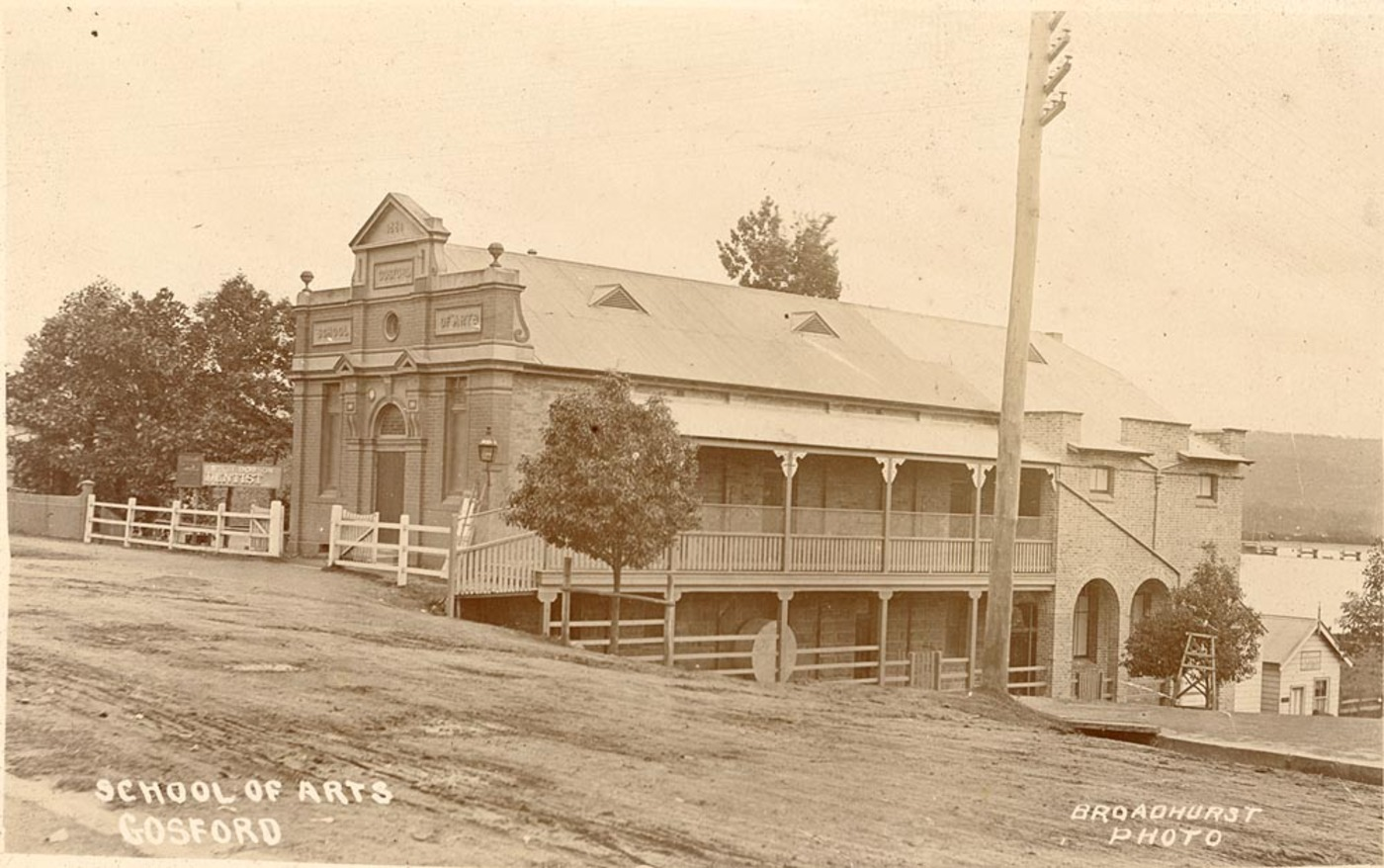
The School of Arts on the corner of Mann Street and Georgiana Terrace, Gosford, was the council seat of Gosford from 1886 to 1907, and Erina from 1907 to 1912. It was destroyed by fire and rebuilt in 1927 with only the sandstone base remaining.

=== Gosford Borough ===
Under the succeeding Municipalities Act, 1867, which allowed for residents to petition the Colonial Government for incorporation, a petition signed by 59 Gosford residents, amongst a population of approximately 1,000 at the time, was sent to the Governor on 10 June 1886 requesting the establishment of the "Borough of Gosford" with two wards, East Gosford and West Gosford. The petition was subsequently accepted and on 11 November 1886, the "Borough of Gosford" was proclaimed by the Governor Lord Carrington, with an area of 1,840 acres in and around the Town of Gosford. The first election for the six aldermen and two auditors was held at Gosford Courthouse on 1 February 1887, and the first mayor, John Bennett Whiteway, was elected at the first Council meeting on 20 February 1887. From 1888, the Borough Council meetings were held in the Gosford School of Arts building at 38 Mann Street.

=== Erina Shire ===
The remaining area of the Brisbane Water Police District outside of Gosford continued to be administered by the police magistrates until 1906. From 7 March 1906, this area became the Erina Shire, when it was proclaimed by the NSW Government Gazette along with 132 other new Shires as a result of the passing of the Local Government (Shires) Act 1905. On 16 May 1906, the Shire was divided in to three Ridings (A, B, C) and five temporary Councillors were appointed (John Bourke of Kincumber, John Martin Moroney of Woy Woy, Harold Stanley Robinson of Penang, Manasseh Ward of Gosford, and Alexander Wilkinson of Wyong). The Temporary Council first met at Gosford Courthouse on 13 June 1906 and Manasseh Ward was elected as the chairman. The first election was held on 24 November 1906 and the first meeting of the elected nine-member Council was held at the Gosford Courthouse on 5 December 1906, with Councillor Ward elected to continue serving as the first Shire President.

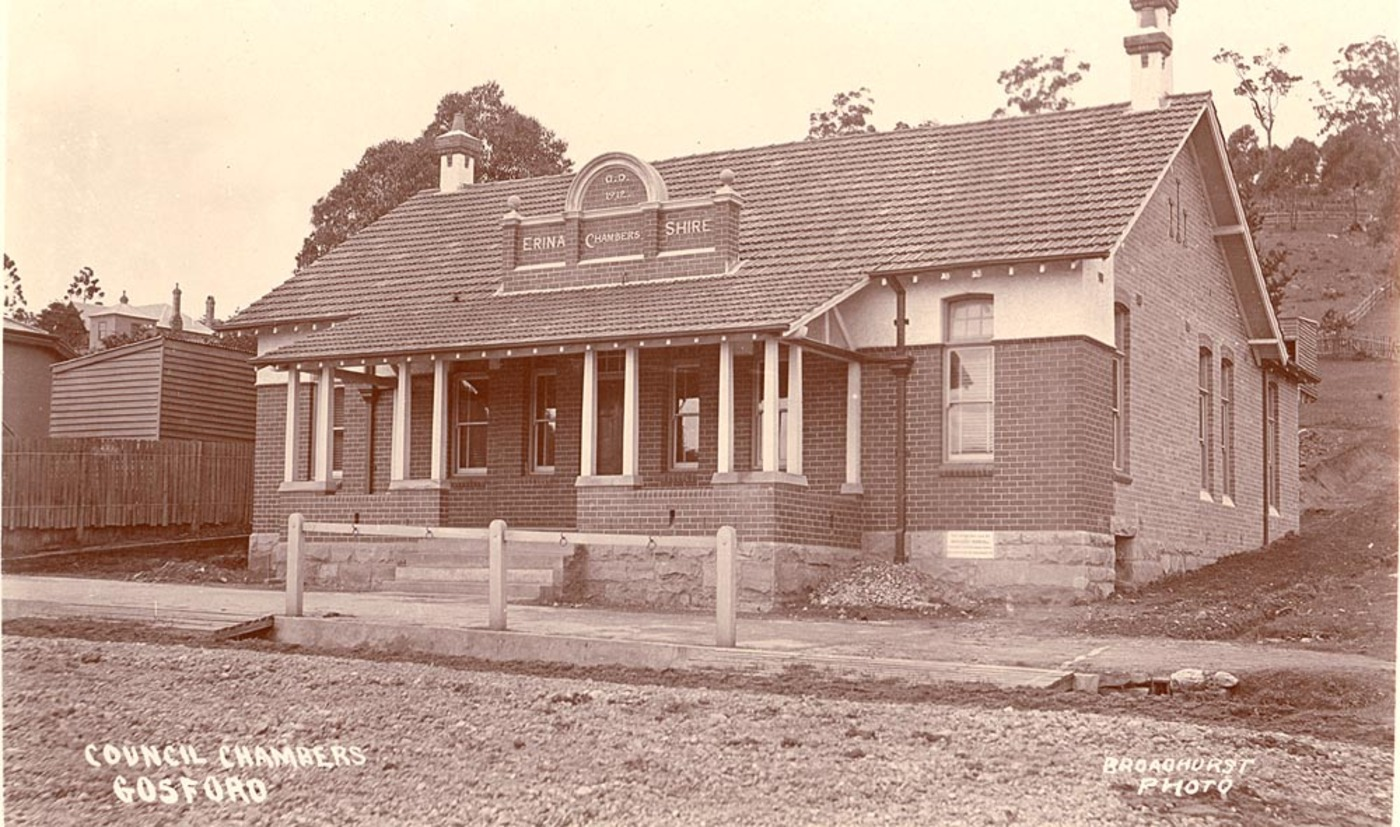
Erina Shire Chambers in Gosford, built 1912.

With the coming into effect of the Local Government Act, 1906, the Borough of Gosford became the Municipality of Gosford, as well as the power of Councils to petition the government to dissolve and merge with other Councils. In July 1907 a petition from the Municipality of Gosford was published in the Government Gazette requesting to merge with Erina Shire, the first Council to do so under the 1906 act. However, owing to objections from the Wyong Progress Association and the Erina Shire Council, a public inquiry was established by the Secretary for Public Works, where it was heard that the Gosford Municipality was in debt and desired to merge with Erina to resolve its financial issues. Despite objections, the commissioner returned a recommendation for the merger and a proposal for a six-ward model was considered and accepted at a conference held on 30 September 1907. The proposal for a six-ward Erina Shire with Gosford becoming F Riding was subsequently proclaimed and came into effect on 23 January 1908. The new Shire Council Chambers on Mann Street, Gosford, were officially opened on 4 May 1912.

=== Woy Woy Shire ===
However, with the substantial size of Erina Shire covering the entirety of the Central Coast region, some local groups began to organise to separate from the shire and manage their own areas. This occurred in D Riding in particular, where in 1921, a group of ratepayers angered by what they saw as a general neglect of their local area, formed an organisation to work towards the separation of the Woy Woy Peninsula area from Erina Shire. On 27 April 1928 a proposal for separation was received and the Shire of Woy Woy was subsequently proclaimed on 1 August 1928. The first Council meeting was held at the Woy Woy Masonic Hall on 11 August 1928, and land developer and businessman Charles Jefferis Staples was elected as the first Shire President. During his tenure as president moves were made to construct a Council Chambers building in the centre of Woy Woy, which was designed by Clifford H. Finch, built by G. J. Richards, and officially opened on 14 March 1931 at the cost of £1845 (now the Woy Woy Library).

Following severe dysfunction from late 1939 in Woy Woy Shire Council, which was unable to meet or elect a president due to boycotts of councillors over a declining financial position, on 14 February 1940 the Minister for Local Government dismissed Woy Woy Shire Council and appointed Keith William Britton as Administrator. A subsequent investigation by the Administrator found the council's finances "unsound" and subject to an "insidious drift".

=== Gosford Municipality and Brisbane Water County Council ===
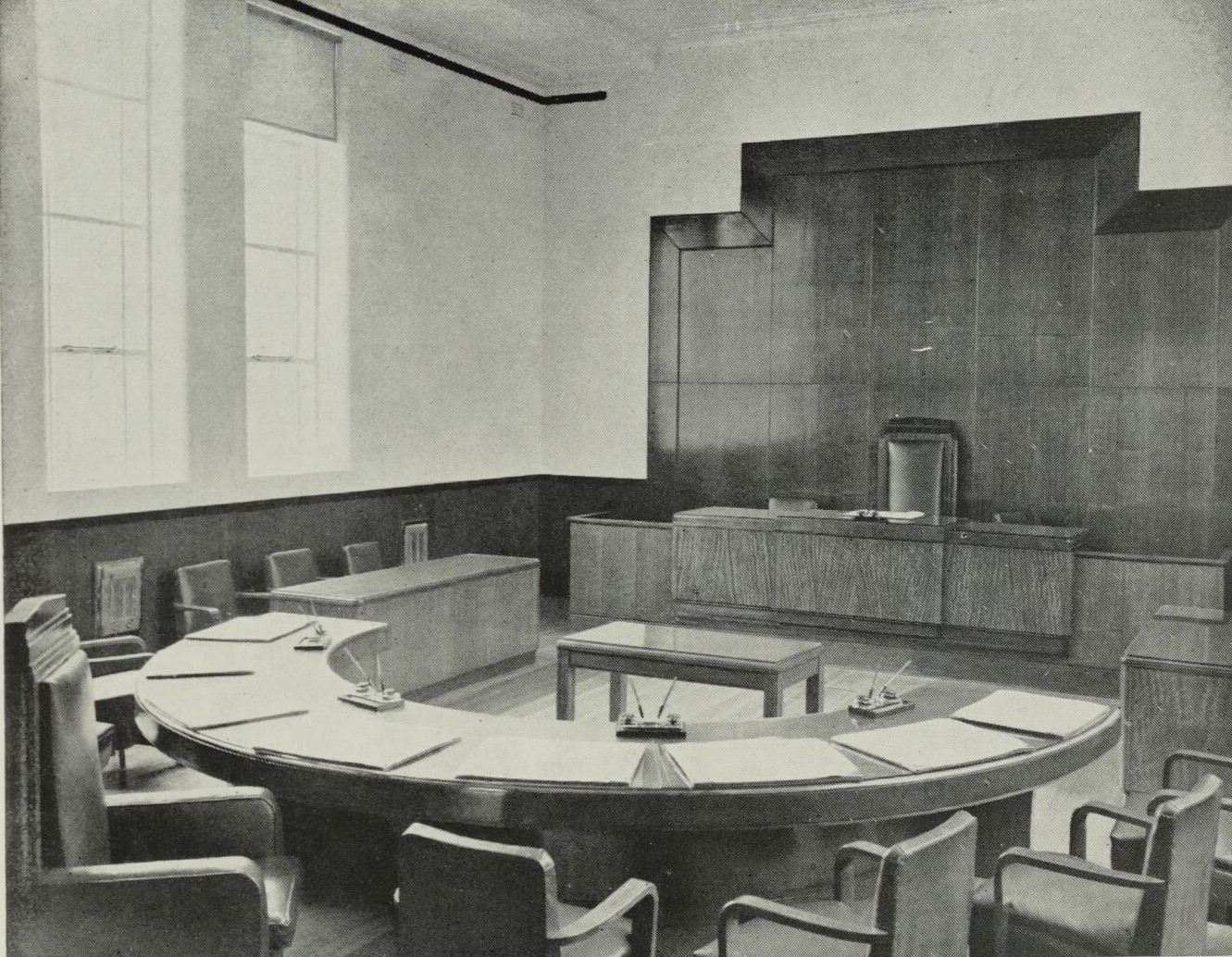
The meeting chamber of Gosford Council Chambers on Mann Street, completed in 1939.

In March 1936, three Councillors of Erina Shire were dismissed from office for having held office while subject to a special disqualification, and it was also revealed that Council staff had not been paid since February. As the council could not meet due to lack of quorum, on 24 March 1936 the Minister for Local Government, Eric Spooner, dismissed the council and appointed an Administrator, B. C. Hughes. Spooner commissioned Hughes to undertake an inquiry into the administration of Erina Shire and, following a January petition from Gosford and Point Clare residents for a new Gosford municipality, also to investigate the question of the separation of Gosford from the Shire. The inquiry found in favour of a separation of Gosford, which was accepted by Spooner, and Erina Shire was divided again to re-form the Municipality of Gosford on 24 October 1936, including the areas of the former Gosford Municipality abolished in 1908 and also new areas from Narara to Woy Woy and Point Clare. A nine-member provisional council was appointed the same day, and at the first meeting on 24 October 1936 William Calman Grahame was elected as the first Mayor and Charles Staples, the former Mayor of Woy Woy, was elected Deputy Mayor. Following the first Council election on 23 January 1937, Grahame and Staples were re-elected to their positions on 29 January.

In March 1938, the first permanent supply of town water was delivered to Gosford, with the opening of a new water supply direct from Lower Mooney Dam on the Mooney Mooney Creek. On 22 April 1939, the Gosford Council Chambers on Mann Street, designed in the Inter-war Art Deco style by architects Loyal Figgis and Virgil Cizzio and built by A. E. Catterall at a cost of £5,785, was officially opened by the Minister for Local Government, Eric Spooner.

Following significant debate about the provision of electricity undertakings across the Central Coast, including over the split between Erina Shire and Gosford, on 16 October 1942 Gosford Municipality combined with the Shires of Erina and Woy Woy to form the Brisbane Water County Council to provide electricity to the combined area of the three councils. The County Council operated as an electricity and gas supplier and retailer and was managed by representatives of the three councils. The County Council operated until its amalgamation with the Sydney County Council from 1 January 1980.

=== City of Gosford and Wyong Shire Councils ===
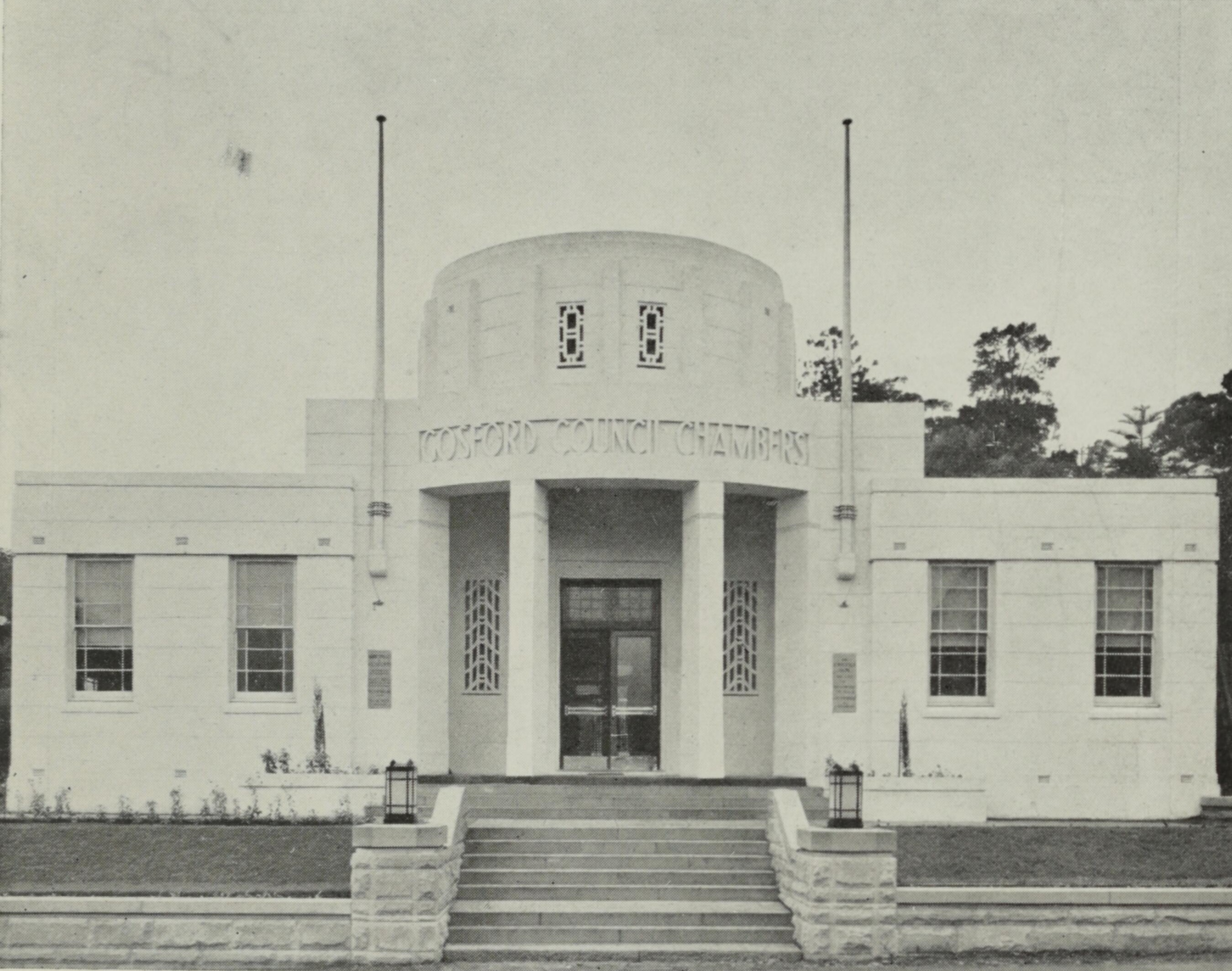
Gosford Council Chambers on Mann Street, completed in 1939 was the council seat until 1974, when it was demolished for the present Gosford Administration Building.

In June 1945, Erina Shire resolved to investigate the reconstitution of local government on the Central Coast into two shires and following further discussions a formal proposal was presented to the Minister for Local Government, Joseph Cahill, in October 1945. Nevertheless, the proposal proved divisive, with Gosford and the Wyong section of Erina Shire in favour and the rest of Erina Shire and Woy Woy Shire opposed. The formal government inquiry subsequently supported the proposal and in April 1946, Cahill notified the councils of his intention to proceed. In response, Woy Woy Shire held a plebiscite in July 1946 on the question which on a low turnout resolved to opposed amalgamation, a vote that Cahill considered a waste of public money considering the decision was already made. On 1 January 1947, part of Erina Shire, all of Woy Woy Shire and the Municipality of Gosford formed Gosford Shire, and the remainder of Erina Shire north and east of Kulnura, Central Mangrove and Lisarow formed Wyong Shire.

Following the changes, the new Wyong Shire Council initially rented the old Erina Shire offices in Gosford, but soon acquired some army huts from Cowra and had them moved to Wyong to serve as temporary Council Chambers, which were officially opened by Minister Joseph Cahill on 4 February 1948. These chambers were later replaced by a more substantial Council Administration Building at 2 Hely Street Wyong completed in 1959.

In August 1948, Gosford Shire established the first Library Service, with branches opening on 13 August at Woy Woy (in the old Council Chambers) and on 16 August on Mann Street next to the Council Chambers. An expanded Gosford Branch Library was opened in 1951 by the Minister for Education, Bob Heffron. New Libraries were subsequently opened at Gosford (Donnison St, 1969), Umina (1983), Kariong (2002) and at Kincumber, Wyoming and Erina (2003). Wyong Shire took longer to deliver its own Library Service by 1959, having delayed a proposal on cost grounds in 1951, and held a referendum on the question in December 1953 which was resolved in favour of adopting the Library Act 1939. Wyong Shire Council formally adopted the act in 1958 and opened the first public library service on the ground floor of the Council Chambers in May 1959. The Wyong Library Service eventually expanded to five branches at Toukley, The Entrance, Tuggerah (1995), Lake Haven (2002), and Bay Village.

In 1974–1976, the 1939 Gosford Council Council Chambers were demolished and replaced by the Gosford Administration Building, a Brutalist style tower with a pre-cast concrete facade designed by prominent architects, McConnell Smith & Johnston. On 9 November 1979, the Shire of Gosford was proclaimed as the City of Gosford, with effect from 1 January 1980.

=== Establishment of Central Coast Council ===
In 2015 a review of local government boundaries by the NSW Government Independent Pricing and Regulatory Tribunal recommended that Wyong Shire and Gosford City Councils should merge to form one single council to cover the whole Central Coast region with an area of 1,681 square kilometres (649 sq mi) and support a population of approximately 331,007. This proposal was supported by Wyong Shire and Gosford City councils, who had submitted the proposal to merge as part of the NSW Government's Fit for the Future reform process.

On 12 May 2016, with the release of the Local Government (Council Amalgamations) Proclamation 2016, the Central Coast Council was formed from Wyong Shire and Gosford City councils. The first meeting of the Central Coast Council was held at the Wyong Civic Centre on 25 May 2016, with meetings alternating between Gosford and Wyong. From amalgamation on 12 May 2016 to September 2017, the Central Coast Council area was administered by the former General Manager of Blacktown City Council (2000–2005), Ian Reynolds, with former Wyong Shire Acting General Manager Rob Noble appointed as Interim General Manager and Gosford City General Manager Paul Anderson appointed Deputy General Manager.

The first election for the new 15-member Council across five wards was held on 8 September 2017, with 6 Labor, 5 Independent and 4 Liberal councillors elected.

=== Administration ===
On 30 October 2020, the Minister for Local Government, Shelley Hancock announced the suspension of the elected Council and the appointment of Dick Persson as the new interim Administrator of Central Coast Council for an initial period of three months. This occurred following the reveal of an $89 million debt in Council finances and an emergency $6.2 million loan provided by the NSW Government in order for Council to pay its own staff. Persson's appointment was announced with the task of ensuring "greater oversight and control over the council’s budget and expenditure to restore its financial sustainability and importantly reinstill the community’s trust in the effective functioning of their council." Persson, a former administrator of Northern Beaches Council and Warringah Council in Sydney, and the Port Macquarie-Hastings Council in the Mid North Coast region was also appointed with Rik Hart on the administration operations team, with whom he had worked on the transformation at Warringah Council in 2007–2008. On 26 October 2020, following Hancock's notice of her intention to suspend the council on 21 October, Councillors Rebecca Gale (Gosford East; Liberal) and Troy Marquart (Gosford West; Liberal) resigned from the council.

On 3 November 2020, Persson announced that the Council CEO, Gary Murphy, would continue on extended leave, and Rik Hart was appointed as Acting CEO. Rik Hart is a former Chief Executive of Hutt City Council (2001–2006) and General Manager of Warringah Council (2007–2016) and Inner West Council (2016–2019). In Mar–Sep 2019 he was Acting CEO of the City of Parramatta Council following the early termination of the previous CEO. On 30 November 2020, Persson announced that he had terminated Murphy's employment as CEO, effective immediately.

On 2 December 2020, Persson delivered his first 30-day interim report which revealed "catastrophic budget mismanagement", including accumulated losses of $232 million since 2016, increased debt from $317 million (2016) to $565 million (2020), and an estimated operating loss of $115 million for 2020/2021 financial year. Persson found that while no evidence of corruption could be found, poor financial decisions by senior management including the CEO and Chief Financial Officer, including the use of restricted reserve funds for capital works, contributed to the poor financial position of the council, and that the elected council failed to hold management to account: "This is a story about the failure of a council to understand or practise the basics of sound financial management." Persson noted that several actions were required to put the council in a stronger position including asset sales of at least $40 million, an increase in rates and council charges, and a substantial reduction in Council staff to 2016 amalgamation levels including a significant reduction in upper and middle management positions. While acknowledging that most staff were "working hard to deliver services to their community [and] what has occurred is not their fault", Persson also noted the hardship and impact that "previous financial mismanagement will have on all residents and ratepayers of the Central Coast", "they don't expect to see things go from what seemed to be okay to what I'm calling the greatest financial calamity in the history of local government in New South Wales". On 14 December 2020 Persson formally adopted the first region-wide Central Coast Local Environmental Plan (CCLEP) and Development Control Plan (CCDCP), consolidating the Gosford and Wyong plans.

On 21 January 2021, the Minister for Local Government announced the extension of Persson's term for an additional three months to 29 April 2021, noting: "There is no doubt that [Persson] needs more time to develop and implement his recovery strategy to restore stability and address the significant reputational, financial and organisational issues. In particular, Mr Persson is focusing on recruiting a new general manager and putting a new budget in place for next financial year. Mr Persson and acting general manager Rik Hart have done an outstanding job to date and I thank them for their efforts in these very challenging circumstances." On 2 February, Persson delivered his 3-month progress report announcing a number of further changes, including that Rik Hart be appointed as Financial Controller once the new CEO takes office, the securing of new loans of $150 million and a referendum to reduce the number of councillors.

On 2 March 2021, Persson announced the appointment of David Farmer as the next council CEO, commencing his term on 12 April 2021. Farmer has served as the CEO of Ipswich City Council (2019–2021), General Manager of Wollongong City Council (2007–2019), CEO of Cairns City Council (2000–2007), and General Manager of Mudgee Shire Council (1996–2000). The following day on 3 March, Persson also announced that he had approved a referendum to be held at the next local government elections, scheduled for September 2021, to request the reduction of the number of councillors from 15 to 9, with the option of a no-ward or three-ward models.

On 15 April 2021, Persson sent his final report to Minister Hancock expressing his view that "by far the greatest reason CCC became insolvent was due to mismanagement of their budget over the years following the merger and leading up to their suspension" and recommending that the Local Government Minister, "take whatever action necessary to prevent the return of the currently suspended councilors, and to delay the September 2021 election to allow a formal Inquiry to determine what is needed to achieve the successful merger of the two previous Councils." Persson's recommendations were subsequently supported by Shelley Hancock, who on 26 April 2021 announced the convening of a public inquiry headed by Roslyn McCulloch, a partner of Pikes & Verekers and former commissioner in the 2019 public inquiry into Balranald Shire, as the commissioner. Hancock announced that, as a result, the council would remain suspended, the elections scheduled for September 2021 would be postponed to September 2022, and Persson's term as administrator would be extended for a further two weeks to May 2021. Former acting CEO Rik Hart was also announced as the next administrator following Persson's decision to step down, and he took up office as the new administrator on 13 May 2021.

On 10 February 2022, Commissioner McCulloch handed down her report into the council, which was tabled in Parliament by the Minister (now Wendy Tuckerman) on 17 March 2022. The government supported in principle all eight recommendation of the report, including that "civic offices at Central Coast Council be declared vacant, effective immediately". Other recommendations included mandatory financial and company director level management training for local councillors, that the Local Government Act 1993 be amended "to make it clear that money received as a result of levying rate or charges under any other Act may not be used otherwise than for the purpose for which the rate or charge was levied", and that Central Coast Council be removed as a water authority under the Water Management Act 2000 "to enable it to administer its water supply and sewerage services in the same way as other NSW councils".

On 17 March 2022, the NSW Government sacked the whole Central Coast Council which terminated all of the councillors effective immediately after a report of the councils financial management. The council was already suspended and under administration since October 2020 after the council was days away from going into a complete financial collapse.

On 8 October 2024, the Central Coast Council's administration had officially ended and had returned to democracy after almost 4 years of being under administration with a newly elected council of 15 councillors with Lawrie McKinna voted as the new Mayor and Douglas Eaton as the Deputy mayor after Administrator Rik Hart had left Central Coast Council. The councils financial position after leaving administration was at a strong position with just under $200 million in debt as the majority of the money borrowed and loss was repaid.

== See also ==
- Local government areas of New South Wales
