= St Barnabas Anglican Church, Yarramalong =

St Barnabas Anglican Church (former)
- Location in New South Wales
- 33°13′08″S 151°16′35″E
- Location: Yarramalong, Central Coast Council, New South Wales
- Country: Australia
- Previous denomination: Anglican

History
- Status: Church (1885 – 1977; Community hall (since ??)
- Dedication: Saint Barnabas

Architecture
- Functional status: Abandoned
- Architect: James Bailey
- Architectural type: Church
- Years built: 1885–
- Completed: c. 1885
- Closed: 1977

Specifications
- Materials: Timber exterior and interior; Corrugated iron roof

New South Wales Heritage Register
- Official name: St. Barnabas Anglican Church; St Barnabas Anglican Church
- Type: State heritage (built)
- Designated: 2 April 1999
- Reference no.: 201
- Type: Former church
- Category: Religion
- Builders: Volunteer labour under supervision of James Bailey

St Barnabas Anglican Church is a heritage-listed former Anglican church located at Yarramalong Road, Yarramalong, in the Central Coast, New South Wales, Australia. It was built from 1889 by volunteer labour under supervision of James Bailey. The property is owned by the Central Coast Council. It was added to the New South Wales State Heritage Register on 2 April 1999.

== History ==
Ezekiel Waters and William Beaven are buried here. It is the oldest church building in the Central Coast Council local government area. It opened c. 1885 and the last "formal" service was held in 1977. Special monthly services and weddings still take place. Graves situated behind the old church are usually maintained by a committee of local residents. The burial ground can be used only by the descendants of those already interred in the cemetery.

A centenary celebration, well-attended, was held there in 1985.

Today the site is fairly thickly revegetating eucalypt forest.

== Description ==
=== Site ===
The oldest church in the former shire, and its only church with an adjoining cemetery (the cemetery is not within, but adjoins, the State Heritage Register curtilage boundary), St Barnabas' is historically significant. In its restored state it is representative of early church buildings, and reflects the early patterns of settlement in the area. The church and cemetery - with community links, are also socially significant.

An historic photograph in the early 1900s shows the church standing in rough grass, with only two gum trees nearby (some 10 metres (33 ft) from the front door. Other bush and taller gum trees are off to some distance.

=== Church ===
The Church uses local timbers throughout its entire construction, and has simple proportions and delicate details. Sited on traditional east west axis, this modest church of timber construction with lancet windows and steeply pitched corrugated iron roof, has an unusual belfry, with louvered sides atop the west end. Entry is via a small porch of similar detailing to church at west end.

Later modifications to the site include fencing and internal lining boards.

It was reported to be in excellent condition as at 7 May 2013.

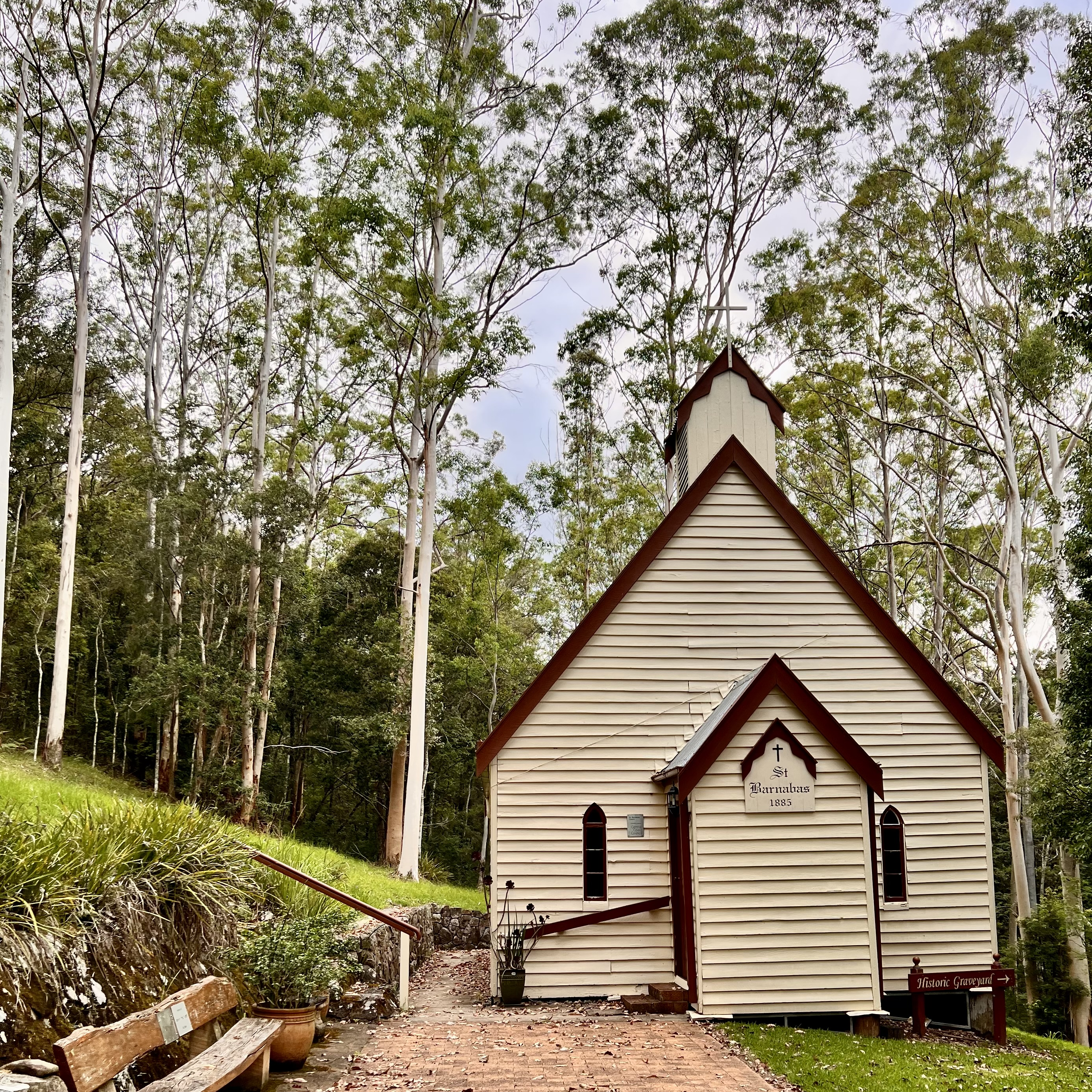
St Barnabas Church, 10 February 2025

== Heritage listing ==
St Barnabas Anglican Church was listed on the New South Wales State Heritage Register on 2 April 1999.

== See also ==
- List of former churches in Australia
