= Canton Bay =

Canton Bay may refer to:

- Kwangchow Bay, an alternative name for the former French colony of Kouang-Tchéou-Wan (present day Zhanjiang, Guangdong)
- The mouth of the Pearl River (China)

== See also ==
- Canton Beach, New South Wales
- Canton, Massachusetts
