= Little Jilliby =

- Suburb
- /0/queryThe property query is required; /0/idsThe property ids is required; /0Failed to match at least one schema; /0/titleThe property title is required; /0/serviceThe property service is required; /0Failed to match exactly one schema; /0/geometriesThe property geometries is required; /0/typeDoes not have a value in the enumeration ["GeometryCollection"]; /0/typeDoes not have a value in the enumeration ["MultiPolygon"]; /0/typeDoes not have a value in the enumeration ["Point"]; /0/typeDoes not have a value in the enumeration ["MultiPoint"]; /0/typeDoes not have a value in the enumeration ["LineString"]; /0/typeDoes not have a value in the enumeration ["MultiLineString"]; /0/typeDoes not have a value in the enumeration ["Polygon"]; /0/coordinatesThe property coordinates is required; /0/geometryThe property geometry is required; /0/typeDoes not have a value in the enumeration ["Feature"]; /0/featuresThe property features is required; /0/typeDoes not have a value in the enumeration ["FeatureCollection"]
- Coordinates: 33°14′24″S 151°21′36″E
- Country: Australia
- State: New South Wales
- City: Central Coast
- LGA: Central Coast Council
- Location: 9 km (5.6 mi) NW of Wyong

Government
  - State electorate: Wyong
  - Federal division: Dobell

Population
  - Total: 120 (2016 census)
- Postcode: 2259
- Parish: Wyong

Little Jilliby is a suburb of the Central Coast region of New South Wales, Australia. It is part of the Central Coast Council local government area. At the 2016 Australian Census, Little Jilliby has a population of 120.

Little Jilliby is an area described as generally those properties on either side of Little Jilliby Road, in the valley running west from Jilliby Road. Jilliby State Conservation Area is nearby.
