= Jared Wright (Australian politician) =

Australian politician (born 1999)

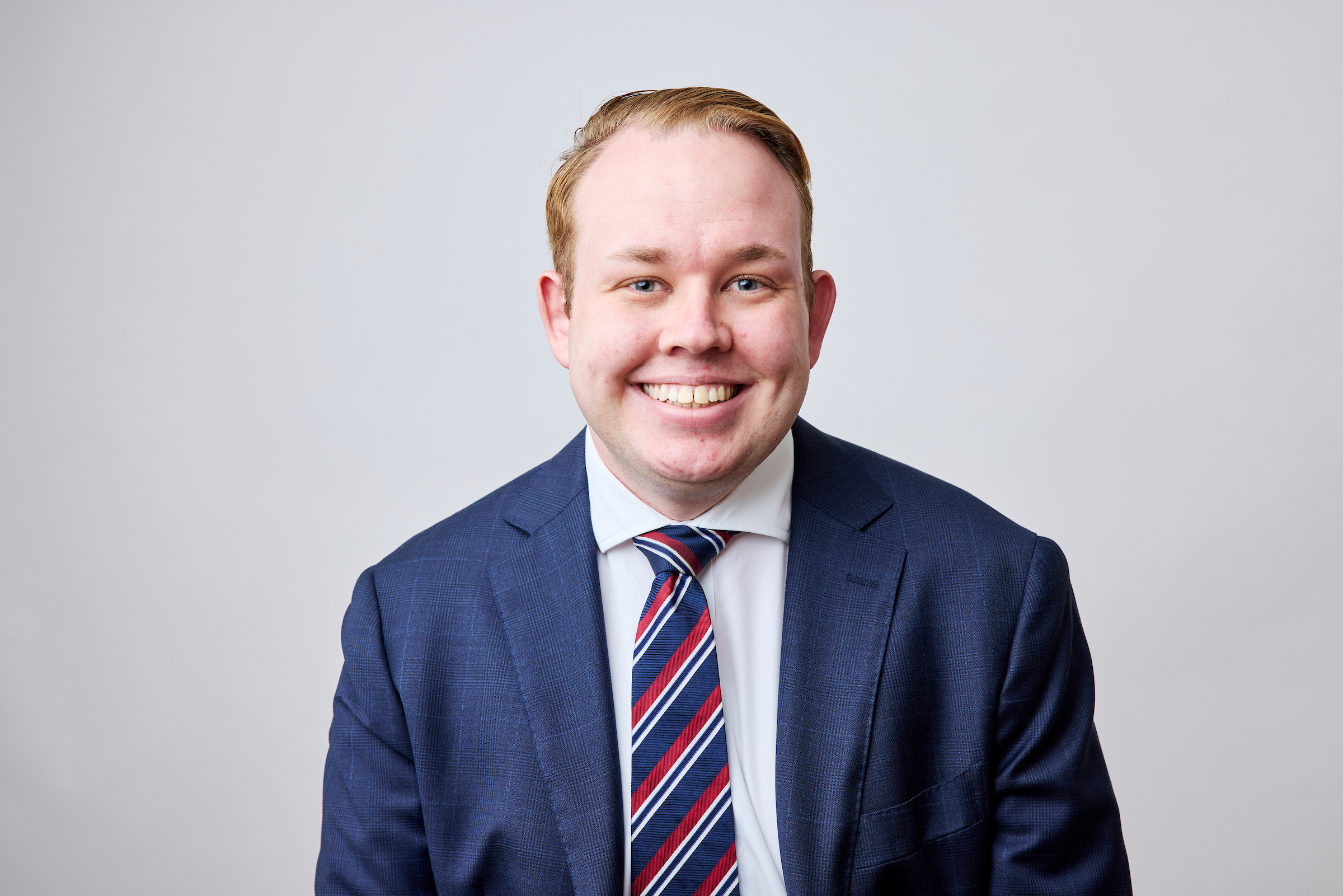

Councillor for Central Coast Council
- Incumbent
- Assumed office 14 September 2024
- Preceded by: Rebecca Gale Collins

Jared Liam Wright (born 31 October 1999) is an Australian politician currently serving as a Councillor on the Central Coast Council in New South Wales. He was elected in September 2024 at the age of 24, making him one of the youngest councillors in the region's history. Wright is a member of the New South Wales Liberal Party and represents the Gosford East Ward as well as the region more broadly.

== Early life and education ==
Jared Wright was born and raised on the Central Coast of New South Wales. He grew up in Kincumber and Avoca Beach, where he participated in local sports, including soccer with the Avoca Football Club, Australian rules football with the Terrigal Avoca Panthers, and cricket with the Kincumber Avoca Cricket Club. He attended Kincumber High School, completing his Higher School Certificate in 2017. In 2020, he graduated from the University of Technology Sydney.

== Career ==
Career Wright works in a consulting role at Australian financial services firm Honner, where he is involved with asset managers, investment banks, financial advisers, and asset consultants. During his university studies, he worked for members of the New South Wales Parliament, including former NSW Treasurer Matt Kean and former Minister for Multiculturalism and Seniors Mark Coure MP.

== Political career ==
Wright was elected as a councillor for Central Coast Council in 2024, following a period when the council was under administration. The Central Coast Council was formed in 2016 after the merger of Gosford City Council and Wyong Shire Council. Wright was the lead candidate for the Gosford East Ward, alongside former Gosford City Councillor Dee Bocking. He is an active member of the NSW Liberal Party and serves as President of the Terrigal Young Liberals. He is also an executive member of the NSW Young Liberals.

=== Public policy and council activities ===
In 2024, the Central Coast Council conducted a public survey regarding local road conditions, which Wright promoted as a way to assess infrastructure needs. He was also involved in council discussions on financial transparency and the disclosure of council debt.

The council debated coastal housing erosion and infrastructure risks, an issue affecting local residents, with Wright contributing to the discussions. The council also approved the installation of new hand railings at Terrigal Haven, a measure discussed in meetings regarding public safety.

=== Public safety and emergency response ===
Wright has been part of discussions concerning public safety, particularly regarding coastal areas. Topics addressed by the council, include responses to coastal erosion affecting housing and community concerns following incidents of missing persons near local beaches.
