= Jim Lloyd =

Australian politician

The Honourable Jim Lloyd JP

Minister for Local Government, Territories and Roads
- In office 18 July 2004 – 3 December 2007
- Preceded by: Ian Campbell
- Succeeded by: Abolished

Member of the Australian Parliament for Robertson
- In office 2 March 1996 – 24 November 2007
- Preceded by: Frank Walker
- Succeeded by: Belinda Neal

Personal details
- Born: 17 July 1954 (age 71) Sydney, Australia
- Party: Liberal Party of Australia

James Eric Lloyd (born 17 July 1954) is an Australian former politician who served with the Liberal Party of Australia member of the Australian House of Representatives from the March 1996 election until the November 2007 election, representing the Division of Robertson in New South Wales.

== Biography ==
Lloyd was born in Sydney and educated at Homebush Boys High School and worked in a variety of occupations, including milkman, ferry and cruise boat crew member, manager of a marina and service station proprietor before entering politics.

Lloyd was the Liberal Party candidate for the safe Labor seat of Peats at the 1984 New South Wales state election, gathering 33.40% of the vote. His lobbying work prior to entering politics included collecting 60,000 signatures which resulted in the re-opening of the Cheero Point section of the Pacific Highway, which had been closed for several years following landslides.

Lloyd was Chief Government Whip from 2001 to 2004 before his appointment as Minister for Local Government, Territories and Roads in July 2004. He was defeated in the 2007 election by Labor member Belinda Neal.

Political offices
Preceded by Ian Campbell	Minister for Local Government, Territories & Roads; 2004–2007	Title abolished
Parliament of Australia
Preceded by Frank Walker	Member for Robertson; 1996–2007	Succeeded by Belinda Neal
