= Kingfisher Shores =

- Suburb
- Interactive map of Kingfisher Shores
- Coordinates: 33.132°S 151.651°E
- Country: Australia
- State: New South Wales
- City: Central Coast
- LGA: Central Coast Council
- Location: 16 km (9.9 mi) SSW of Swansea

Government
  - State electorate: Swansea
  - Federal division: Shortland

Population
  - Total: 163 (2016 census)
- Postcode: 2259
- Parish: Wallarah

Kingfisher Shores is a suburb of the Central Coast region of New South Wales, Australia. It is part of the Central Coast Council local government area.

The suburb was part of Chain Valley Bay, and was approved as a separate suburb on 11 May 2007.

As of 2021, the neighbourhood has had a community garden installed as a courtesy from the power company Delta Electricity.
