= Yarramalong, New South Wales =

Yarramalong
- Suburb
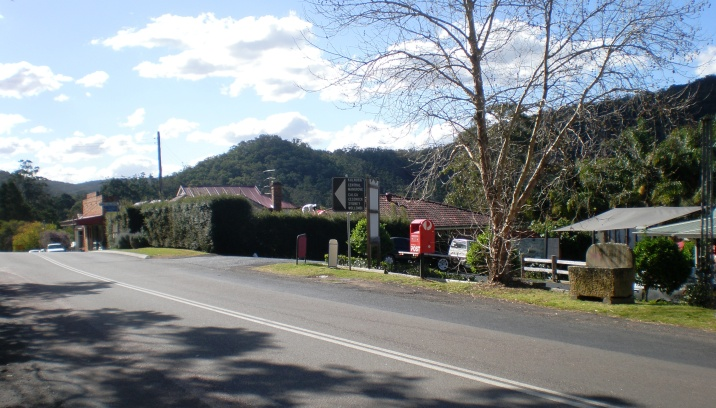
- Main street of Yarramalong c. 2009

- Interactive map of Yarramalong
- Coordinates: 33.223°S 151.285°E
- Country: Australia
- State: New South Wales
- City: Central Coast
- LGA: Central Coast Council
- Location: 88 km (55 mi) SW of Newcastle; 20 km (12 mi) WNW of Wyong; 35 km (22 mi) WNW of The Entrance; 36 km (22 mi) NNW of Gosford; 93 km (58 mi) N of Sydney

Government
  - State electorate: Wyong
  - Federal division: Dobell

Area
  - Total: 26.4 km^{2} (10.2 sq mi)
- Elevation: 40 m (130 ft)

Population
  - Total: 468 (2011 census)
  - Density: 17.73/km^{2} (45.91/sq mi)
- Postcode: 2259
- Parish: Eglington
Suburbs around Yarramalong
Cedar Brush Creek	Ravensdale	Jilliby
Kulnura	Yarramalong	Wyong Creek
Kulnura	Kulnura	Wyong Creek

Yarramalong (cedar country) is a township and suburb of the Central Coast region of New South Wales, Australia, located 20 kilometres (12 mi) upstream from Wyong along the Wyong River. It is part of the Central Coast Council local government area.

The Yarramalong township has: Rural Fire Station, two cemeteries, public school (which closed down recently and is now used for community purposes), general store/petrol station, bottle shop/guest house and a hall which was originally an art hall but is now also used for community purposes. Busways now only operates a school bus service between Yarramalong and Wyong. It was acquired from Yarramalong Bus Lines in 2008.

Yarramalong Valley is the home of many horse studs, turf farms, citrus crops as well as a macadamia nut farm and a lavender farm.

The Great North Walk also passes through Yarramalong to Cedar Brush Creek to the north and Kulnura.

== History of Yarramalong ==
The Yarramalong Valley is in the land of the Darkinjung people. The name derives from the aboriginal words, "Yarraman," meaning horse, and "long" meaning place. Yarraman is thought to be derived from the word "yira" or "yera" which means large teeth, possibly from one of the Sydney languages.

The Yarramalong Valley was first permanently settled by in 1856 by the Stinson and Waters families of Maitland. Prior to the 1850s the valley was logged by timber cutters driving teams of oxen from Wollombi and Maitland.

Yarramalong Public School opened in 1870 to serve the growing community in the Yarramalong Valley. The school ceased operation in 2008 due to falling student numbers.

Yarramalong is the site of the former St Barnabas Church. Built in c. 1885, it is one of the oldest churches in Central Coast Council and now under a permanent conservation order. The church closed in 1977 and is now owned by the Central Coast Council.

== Heritage listings ==
Yarramalong has a number of heritage-listed sites, including:

- Yarramalong Road: St Barnabas Anglican Church
