= Wyong Creek =

- Suburb
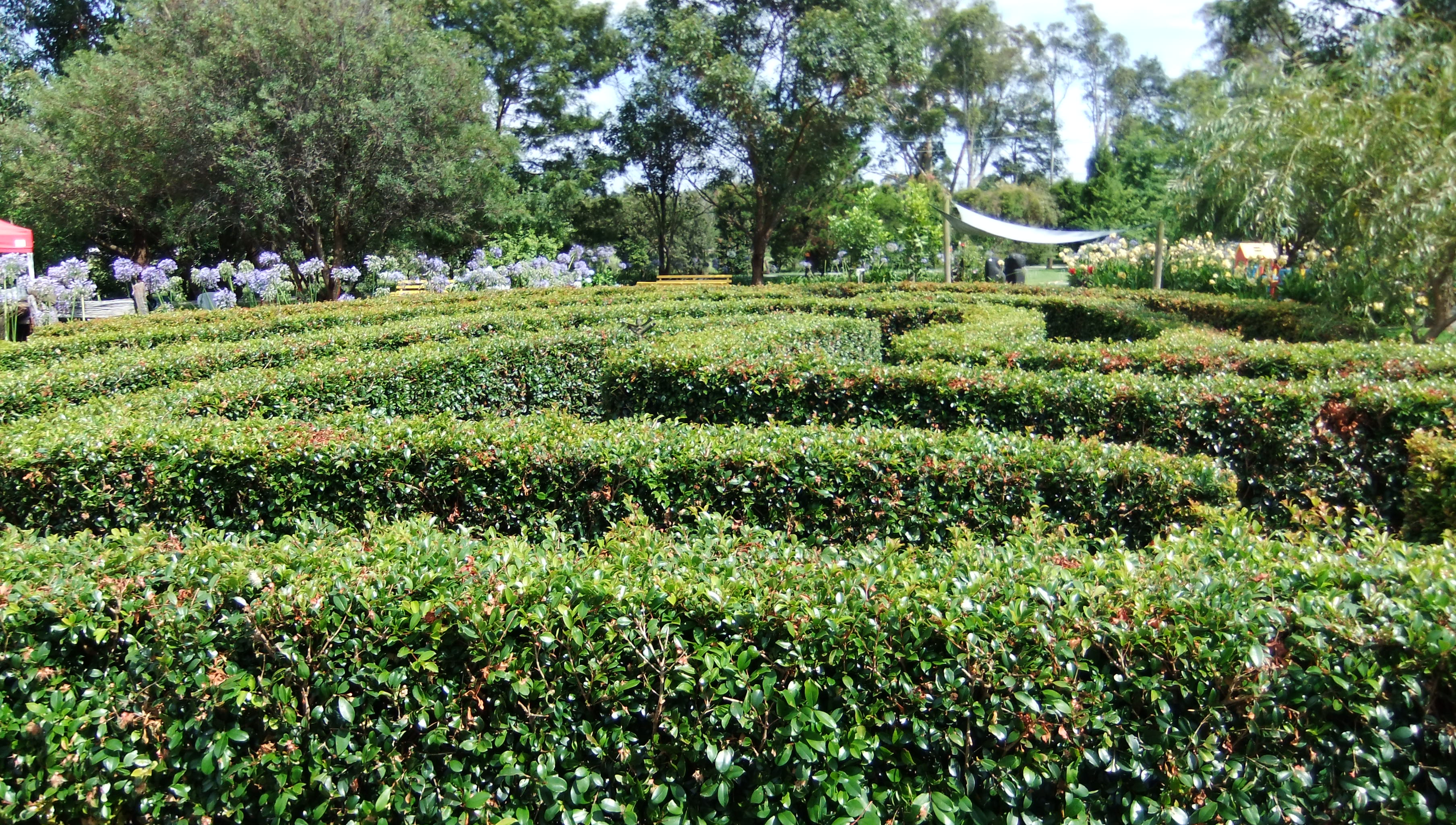
- Amazement Farm & Fun Park

- Interactive map of Wyong Creek
- Coordinates: 33°15′54″S 151°22′05″E
- Country: Australia
- State: New South Wales
- City: Central Coast
- LGA: Central Coast Council
- Location: 8 km (5.0 mi) W of Wyong

Government
  - State electorate: Lake Macquarie
  - Federal division: Dobell

Population
  - Total: 476 (2021 census)
- Postcode: 2259
- Parish: Ourimbah
Suburbs around Wyong Creek
	Jilliby
Yarramalong	Wyong Creek	Jilliby
	Ourimbah

Wyong Creek is a suburb of the Central Coast region of New South Wales, Australia. It is part of the Central Coast Council local government area. In the 2021 census, Wyong Creek had a population of 476 people.

== History ==
Wyong Public School was requested in April 1881 and opened on 5th November 1883 as a provisional school named as Wyong Creek Lower. It became a public school in April 1884. The name changed from Wyong Creek Lower to its current name in September 1888.

The Wyong Creek Community Hall was opened by Alec Wilkinson in 1914.

== Demographics ==
In the 2011 census, Wyong Creek recorded a population of 387 people, 50.1% female and 49.9% male with 2.3% being Indigenous Australian. The median age of the population was 45 years, 8 years above the national median of 37. 82.7% of people living in Wyong Creek were born in Australia. The other top responses for country of birth were England 5.7%, New Zealand 1.8%, Canada 1.0%, France 0.8% and Germany 0.8%. 90.2% of people spoke only English at home; the next most common languages were 1.5% German, 1.0% Portuguese, 0.8% French, 0.8% Italian and 0.8% Hungarian.

In the 2016 census, Wyong Creek recorded a population of 434 people, 47.9% female and 52.1% male with 3.9% being Indigenous Australian. The median age of the population was 47 years, 9 years above the national median of 38. 84.0% of people living in Wyong Creek were born in Australia. The other top responses for country of birth were England 4.1%, New Zealand 1.9% and Germany 0.7%. 87.9% of people spoke only English at home; the next most common languages were 1.9% German and 0.7% Arabic.

In the 2021 census, Wyong Creek recorded a population of 476 people, 51.5% female and 48.5% male with 2.9% being Indigenous Australian. The median age of the population was 47 years, 9 years above the national median of 38. 83.0% of people living in Wyong Creek were born in Australia. The other top responses for country of birth were England 4.8%, New Zealand 1.5%, Germany 0.8%, United States of America 0.8% and South Africa 0.6%. 91.8% of people spoke only English at home; the next most common languages were 1.5% Malay, 1.1% Swedish, 0.8% Serbian, 0.6% Czech and 0.6% Samoan.

== Education ==
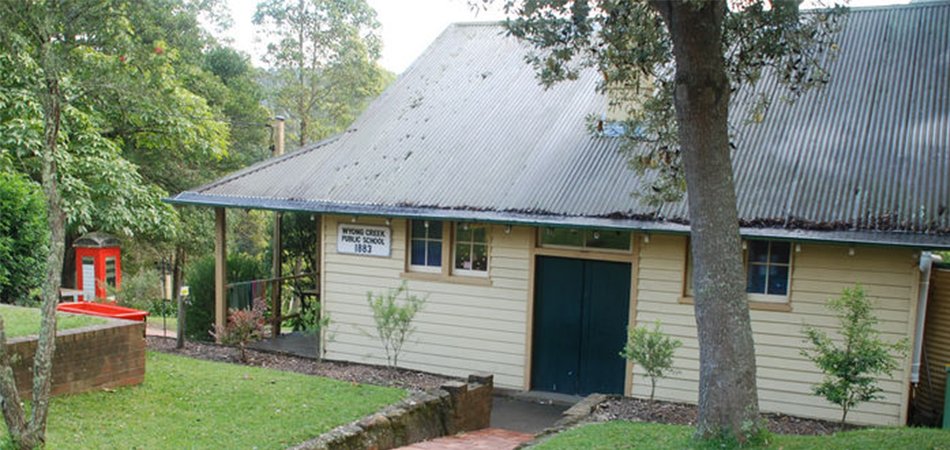
Wyong Creek Public School.

Wyong Creek Public School is a government co-educational primary (Kindergarten-6) school at 583 Yarramalong Road (33.26746°S 151.34814°E). In 2023, the school had an enrolment of 74 students with 5 teachers (4 full-time equivalent) and 3 non-teaching staff (1.4 full-time equivalent). It has been heritage listed since 1991.

== Heritage listings ==
Wyong Creek has a number of heritage-listed sites, including:

- Wyong Creek Community Hall at 791 Yarramalong Road (33.26140°S 151.33404°E).
- Wyong Creek Public School at 583 Yarramalong Road (33.26746°S 151.34814°E).

== See also ==
- List of Central Coast, New South Wales suburbs
- List of schools in the Hunter and Central Coast
