= 2024 Central Coast Council election =

Election in New South Wales, Australia

- 14 September 2024

All 15 seats on Central Coast Council 8 seats needed for a majority
- Registered: 260,408 ▲3.68%
- Turnout: 81.89% (▲6.29 pp)

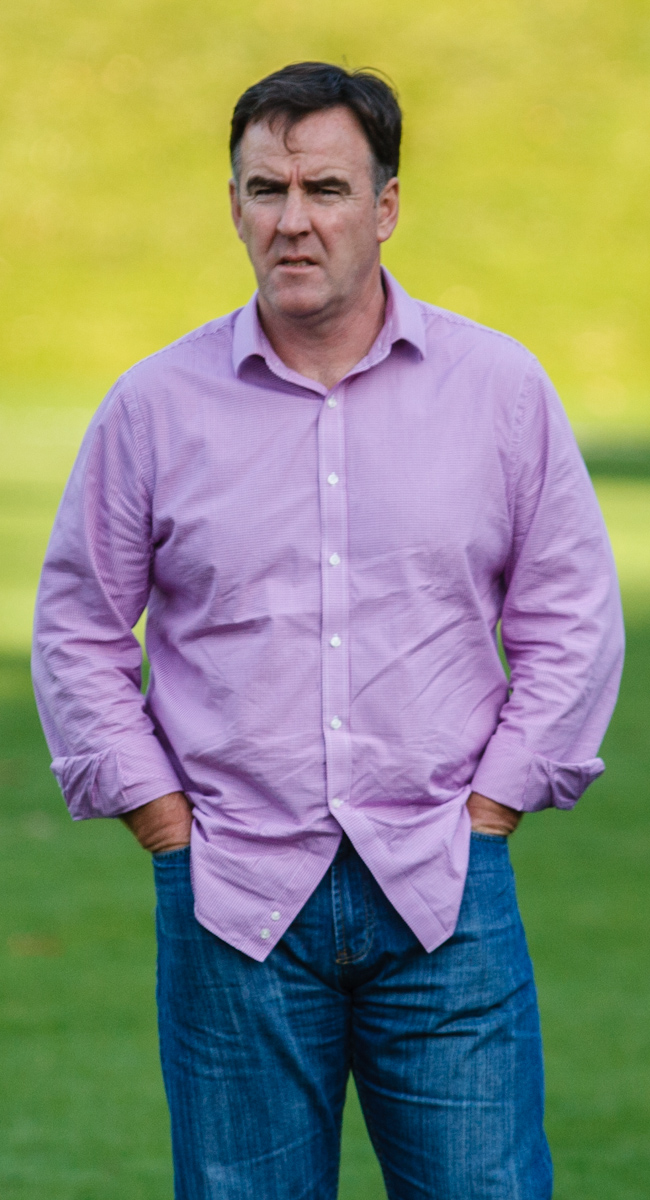

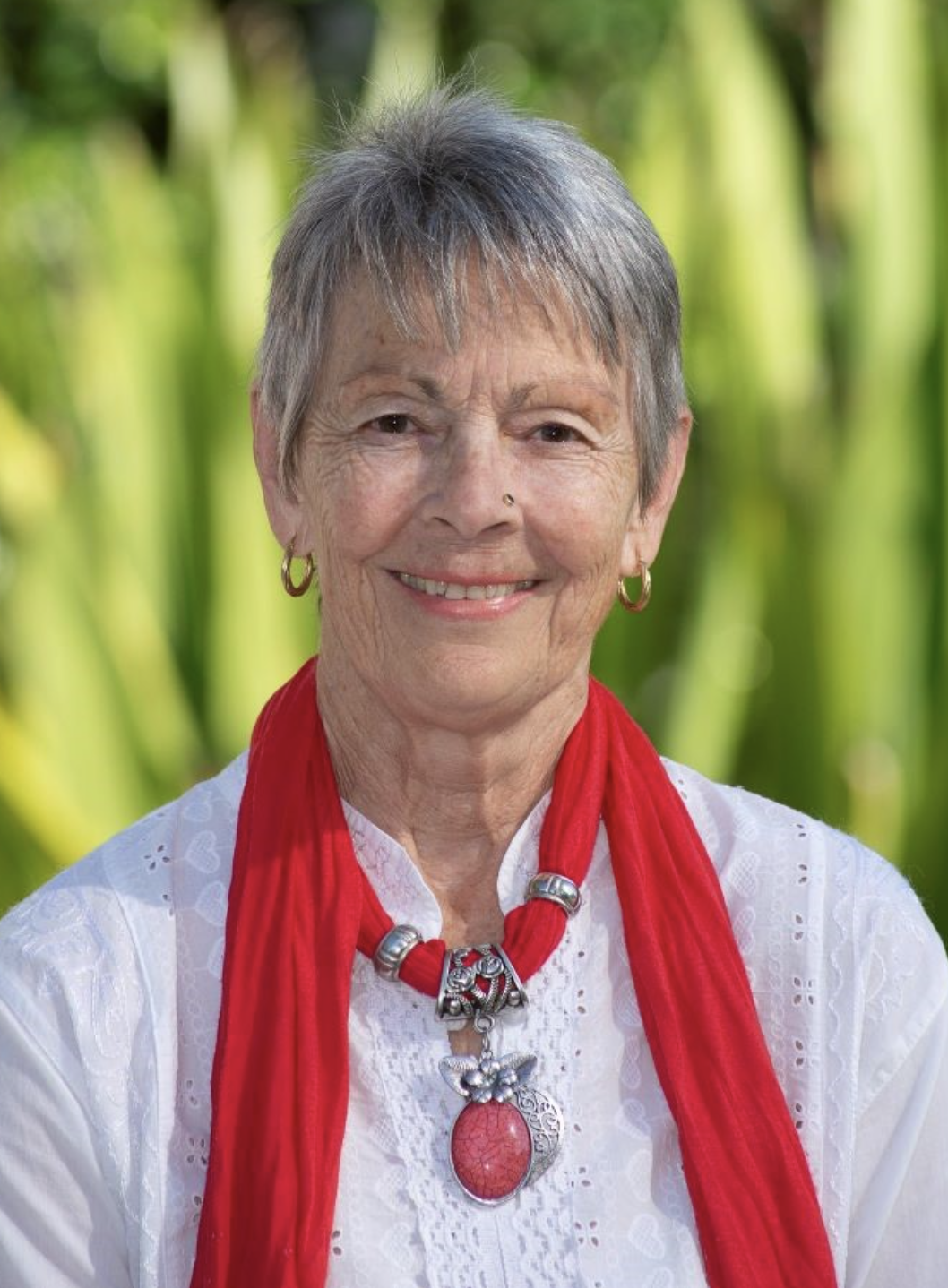
	First party	Second party
Leader	Belinda Neal	N/A
Party	Labor	Liberal
Leader since	22 August 2024	N/A
Leader's seat	Gosford West (won seat)	N/A
Last election	6 seats	4 seats
Seats before	6	2
Seats won	5	4
Seat change	▼1	▲2
Popular vote	60,162	47,232
Percentage	30.82%	24.20%
Swing	▲0.80	▼0.50
	Third party	Fourth party
Leader	Lawrie McKinna	Sue Wynn
Party	Team CC	Greens
Leader since	29 July 2024	7 July 2024
Leader's seat	Gosford East (won seat)	None (contested Budgewoi)
Last election	Did not exist	0 seats
Seats before	0	0
Seats won	3	0
Seat change	▲3	Steady
Popular vote	38,169	6,029
Percentage	19.55%	3.09%
Swing	▲19.55	▼4.71
Largest party before election
N/A (under administration)
Subsequent largest party
Labor

The 2024 Central Coast Council election was held on 14 September 2024 to elect 15 councillors to Central Coast Council as part of the statewide local government elections in New South Wales, Australia.

This was the first election for the council since September 2017, after it was placed into administration on 30 October 2020, missed the local elections in December 2021 and was eventually dismissed on 17 March 2022.

== Background ==
Central Coast Council covers the entire Central Coast region, which has a population of 346,596 as of 2021. This makes it the third-most-populated LGA in New South Wales, behind only Blacktown and Canterbury-Bankstown.

The council was formed on 12 May 2016 as a "super council" after the state government merged the City of Gosford and Wyong Shire. It is composed of five wards, each electing three councillors, totalling 15 councillors for the entire LGA.

=== 2017 election ===
A map of the five wards showing the 2017 election results

At the 2017 election, the Labor Party won a plurality with six seats and 30.2% of the vote. Three independents, two members of the "Central Coast NEW Independents" group and four Liberals were also elected.

=== Administration and dismissal ===
In October 2020, it was revealed that the council was unable to pay 2,000 staff, and the council had a debt of $89 million. On 26 October 2020, Liberal councillors Rebecca Gale-Collins and Troy Marquart resigned, stating they sought to "differentiat[e] themselves from those councillors wishing to show due cause to the minister as to why they should remain in local government".

On 30 October 2020, then-local government minister Shelley Hancock announced the immediate suspension of the council and the appointment of former senior public servant Dick Persson as the new interim administrator. At the commencement of the administration period, debt has reached just under $350 million.

Persson was succeeded as administrator by former acting CEO Rik Hart on 13 May 2021. As a result of being in administration, no election took place for Central Coast in 2021.

On 17 March 2022, the state government formally dismissed the council after a report on its financial management was tabled in the New South Wales parliament. Although there were initially plans to hold a new election in September 2022, these did not eventuate.

== Electoral system ==
Like in all other New South Wales local government areas, Central Coast uses optional preferential voting. Under this system, voters are only required to vote for one group, although they can choose to preference other candidates.

All elections for councillor positions are elected using proportional representation. Central Coast has an Australian Senate-style ballot paper with above-the-line and below-the-line voting. The council is divided into five wards, each electing three councillors.

Voting is compulsory for anyone on the New South Wales state electoral roll. Property owners, rate-paying occupiers or lessees can apply to be on the "non-residential roll" in an LGA, as long as they are not already enrolled as a resident in that area and if they are eligible to be enrolled for state and federal elections. Voting is not compulsory for those on non-residential rolls, although it is still compulsory in the LGA where they are on the residential roll.

== Candidates ==
A total of 77 candidates contested the election.

Belinda Neal, a former federal MP and senator, led Labor and contested Gosford West.

Former Gosford mayor Lawrie McKinna led "Team Central Coast", which had candidates in every ward. Two of the group's candidates, Matt Simon (Gosford East) and Mark Ella (The Entrance), withdrew in early August and were replaced by George Paterson and Sharryn Brownlee respectively. McKinna contested Gosford East, with former Liberal MP Pat Farmer running in second place on the ticket.

The Greens announced former Wyong councillor Sue Wynn as their lead candidate for Budgewoi on 7 July 2024, the only ward the party is contesting.

In Gosford East, the Liberal Party had two candidates, instead of three, after missing the candidate nomination deadline. The Liberals did also not endorse in Budgewoi, where former Wyong mayor Douglas Eaton led an Independent Liberal ticket.

Central Coast NEW Independents, Ratepayers Choice Central Coast and Coasties Who Care all had one group each.

=== Budgewoi ===
Greens	Independent Liberal	Labor	Team Central Coast	Central Coast Heart	Ungrouped
1. Sue Wynn; 2. Chantelle Baistow; 3. Cath Connor	1. Douglas Eaton; 2. Allan McDonald; 3. Greg Best	1. Helen Crowley; 2. Joy Cooper; 3. Sarah Burns	1. John Mouland; 2. Paul Wade; 3. Mitchell Cowan	1. Edna Wacher; 2. Diana Lazatin; 3. Anabelle Alcanar	Sandra Harris (Ind); Kenneth Kozak (Ind)

=== Gosford East ===
Team Central Coast	Labor	Liberal	Ungrouped
1. Lawrie McKinna; 2. Pat Farmer; 3. George Paterson	1. Sharon Walsh; 2. Trevor Drake; 3. Victoria Collins	1. Jared Wright; 2. Dee Bocking	Clive Lawton (Ind); Sharon Andrews (Ind); Rosemary de Lambert (Ind); David Kings (Ind)

=== Gosford West ===
Team Central Coast	NEW Independents	Ratepayers Choice	Liberal
1. Daniel Abou-Chedid; 2. Paul Chapman; 3. Neil Ferguson	1. Jane Smith; 2. Alison Wade; 3. Lisa Wriley	1. Kevin Brooks; 2. Stephen Sizer; 3. Lee Erlin	1. Trent McWaide; 2. Alan Pappas; 3. Kylie Lowbridge
Labor	Coasties Who Care	Ungrouped	
1. Belinda Neal; 2. Adam McArdle; 3. Mark Ellis	1. Lisa Bellamy; 2. Sarah Blakeway; 3. Tegan Mulqueeney	Julian Richards (Ind); Andrew Baker (Ind. PHON)	

=== The Entrance ===
Labor	Animal Justice	Liberal	Independent	Team Central Coast	Ungrouped
1. Margot Castles; 2. Matthew Jeffrey; 3. Joan Pavitt	1. Sarah Ryan; 2. Patrick Murphy; 3. Fardin Pelarek	1. Rachel Stanton; 2. Stephen Hood; 3. Tracey Perrem	1. Corinne Lamont; 2. Sam Carter; 3. Dale Long	1. Sharryn Brownlee; 2. Skaie Hull; 3. Kalvin Smith	Rebecca Smiley (Ind. PHON)

=== Wyong ===
Liberal	Team Central Coast	Labor	Ungrouped
1. John McNamara; 2. Wade Russell; 3. Jennifer Ferguson	1. Kyla Daniels; 2. Natasha Stone; 3. Alexander Burgin	1. Kyle MacGregor; 2. Evan Schrei; 3. Melanie Gould	Michael Whittington (Ind); Daniel Craig (Ind); Rosemary de Lambert (Ind); Jara Millward (Ind)

== Results ==
2024 New South Wales local elections: Central Coast
Party	Votes	%	Swing	Seats	Change
Labor	60,882	31.19	+1.17	5	▼1
Liberal	47,232	24.20	-0.50	4	Steady
Team Central Coast	38,867	19.91	+19.91	3	▲3
Independent Liberal	7,364	3.77	+3.77	1	▲1
Central Coast NEW Independents	4,744	2.43	-7.97	1	▲1
Greens	6,029	3.09	-4.71	0	Steady
Ratepayers Choice Central Coast	4,239	2.17	+2.17	0	Steady
Animal Justice	4,032	2.06	+2.06	0	Steady
Central Coast Heart	3,799	1.95	+1.95	0	Steady
Independent One Nation	757	0.39	+0.39	0	Steady
Independent	12,946	6.63	-10.37	1	▼2
Formal votes	195,196	91.53	-0.74		
Informal votes	18,058	8.47	+0.74		
Total	213,254	100		15	
Registered voters / turnout	260,408	81.89	+6.29		

=== Budgewoi ===
2024 New South Wales local elections: Budgewoi Ward
Party	Candidate	Votes	%	±%
Labor	1. Helen Crowley (elected 1); 2. Joy Cooper; 3. Sarah Burns	12,988	33.99	−9.31
Independent Liberal	1. Douglas Eaton (elected 2); 2. Allan McDonald; 3. Greg Best	7,364	19.27	+2.93
Team Central Coast	1. John Mouland (elected 3); 2. Paul Wade; 3. Mitchell Cowan	6,672	17.46	N/A
Greens	1. Sue Wynn; 2. Chantelle Baistow; 3. Cath Connor	6,029	15.78	+7.98
Central Coast Heart	1. Edna Wacher; 2. Diana Lazatin; 3. Anabelle Alcanar	3,799	9.94	N/A
Independent	Sandra Harris	1,047	2.47	N/A
Independent	Kenneth Kozak	316	0.83	N/A
Total formal votes		38,215	89.24	−1.96
Informal votes		4,606	10.75	+1.95
Turnout		42,821	81.2	−1.0

=== Gosford East ===
2024 New South Wales local elections: Gosford East Ward
Party	Candidate	Votes	%	±%
Team Central Coast	1. Lawrie McKinna (elected 1); 2. Pat Farmer; 3. George Paterson	14,953	38.23	N/A
Labor	1. Sharon Walsh (elected 2); 2. Trevor Drake; 3. Victoria Collins	11,041	28.23	+5.94
Liberal	1. Jared Wright (elected 3); 2. Dee Bocking	8,439	21.58	−15.82
Independent	Rosemary de Lambert	2,275	5.82	N/A
Independent	David Kings	1,399	3.58	N/A
Independent	Sharon Andrews	805	2.06	N/A
Independent	Clive Lawton	197	0.50	N/A
Total formal votes		39,109	92.07	−0.4
Informal votes		3,367	7.92	+1.02
Turnout		42,476	82.82	+1.52

=== Gosford West ===
2024 New South Wales local elections: Gosford West Ward
Party	Candidate	Votes	%	±%
Liberal	1. Trent McWaide (elected 1); 2. Alan Pappas; 3. Kylie Lowbridge	10,830	27.94	+5.74
Labor	1. Belinda Neal (elected 2); 2. Adam McArdle; 3. Mark Ellis	10,722	27.66	+2.26
Central Coast NEW Independents	1. Jane Smith (elected 3); 2. Alison Wade; 3. Lisa Wriley	4,744	12.24	+2.54
Coasties Who Care	1. Lisa Bellamy; 2. Sarah Blakeway; 3. Tegan Mulqueeney	4,305	11.11	N/A
Ratepayers Choice Central Coast	1. Kevin Brooks; 2. Stephen Sizer; 3. Lee Erlin	4,239	10.94	N/A
Team Central Coast	1. Daniel Abou-Chedid; 2. Paul Chapman; 3. Neil Ferguson	3,627	9.35	N/A
Independent	Julian Richards	153	0.39	N/A
Independent One Nation	Andrew Baker	140	0.36	N/A
Total formal votes		38,757	91.45	−0.45
Informal votes		3,622	8.55	+0.45
Turnout		42,379	82.09	+0.49

=== The Entrance ===
2024 New South Wales local elections: The Entrance Ward
Party	Candidate	Votes	%	±%
Liberal	1. Rachel Stanton (elected 1); 2. Stephen Hood; 3. Tracey Perrem	13,677	36.22	+9.82
Labor	1. Margot Castles (elected 2); 2. Matthew Jeffrey; 3. Joan Pavitt	11,329	30.01	+2.31
Independent	1. Corinne Lamont (elected 3); 2. Sam Carter; 3. Dale Long	4,496	11.91	N/A
Animal Justice	1. Sarah Ryan; 2. Patrick Murphy; 3. Fardin Pelarek	4,032	10.68	N/A
Team Central Coast	1. Sharryn Brownlee; 2. Skaie Hull; 3. Kalvin Smith	3,606	9.55	N/A
Independent One Nation	Rebecca Smiley	617	1.63	N/A
Total formal votes		37,757	92.15	−1.35
Informal votes		3,213	7.84	+1.34
Turnout		40,970	80.44	−2.06

=== Wyong ===
2024 New South Wales local elections: Wyong Ward
Party	Candidate	Votes	%	±%
Labor	1. Kyle MacGregor (elected 1); 2. Evan Schrei; 3. Melanie Gould	14,802	35.79	+3.59
Liberal	1. John McNamara (elected 2); 2. Wade Russell; 3. Jennifer Ferguson	14,286	34.54	+13.96
Team Central Coast	1. Kyla Daniels (elected 3); 2. Natasha Stone; 3. Alexander Burgin	10,009	24.20	N/A
Independent	Jara Millward	1,150	2.78	N/A
Independent	Daniel Craig	659	1.59	N/A
Independent	Michael Whittington	449	1.09	N/A
Total formal votes		41,355	92.71	+1.11
Informal votes		3,250	7.28	−1.12
Turnout		44,605	81.92	−0.18

== Referendum ==
Had the 2021 election gone ahead for the Central Coast, the electorate were to be asked whether the council should be reduced in size from 15 to nine councillors, and the wards reduced from five to three. With the postponement of the 2021 elections due to the administration of Council, the referendum was pushed back to the next election.

In 2024, voters were asked whether the Council should reduce the amount of councillors from 15 to nine, reducing the wards from five to three, and thus each ward electing three councillors each. The referendum passed by a majority of 47,621, and as local government referendums are legally binding, the Council must implement these changes for the 2028 elections.

Do you favour a reduction in the number of Central Coast Councillors from 15 to 9 and a reduction in the number of wards from 5 to 3, with each ward electing 3 councillors?
Choice	Votes	%
Yes	125,222	61.74
No	77,601	38.26
Total	202,823	100.00
Valid votes	202,823	95.53
Invalid/blank votes	9,492	4.47
Total votes	212,315	100.00
Source: https://vtr.elections.nsw.gov.au/LG2401/central-coast/referendum
