= Yarramalong Bus Lines =

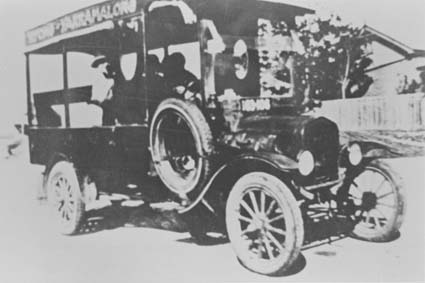
- Model-T Ford operated by Yarramalong Bus Lines in 1925
- Parent: Ashley Palmer
- Commenced operation: 1914
- Ceased operation: January 2008
- Headquarters: Yarramalong
- Service area: Central Coast
- Service type: Bus services
- Routes: 3
- Depots: 1
- Fleet: 4 (January 2008)

Yarramalong Bus Lines was an Australian bus operator that ran bus services in the northern part of the Central Coast of New South Wales from 1914 until it was sold to Busways in January 2008.

== History ==
The business was founded in 1914 by Archie Palmer with a horse-drawn coach to transport passengers and groceries, newspapers and mail. Bags were carried on the roof of the coach and a return trip would cost 2 shillings. A Model-T Ford was the first motorised bus to be acquired and was followed by a Chevrolet in 1948. The bus service ran twice daily in each direction between Yarramalong and Wyong but services were sometimes cancelled because of flooding in the Yarramalong Valley.

A coach operation was established and operated under the Palmer Leisure Tours name. This was sold in January 2003 to Road Runner Tours. In January 2008 the remaining school services were sold to Busways.
