= Belinda Neal =

Australian politician

Councillor of Central Coast Council for Gosford West Ward
- Incumbent
- Assumed office 14 September 2024

Member of the Australian Parliament for Robertson
- In office 24 November 2007 – 19 July 2010
- Preceded by: Jim Lloyd
- Succeeded by: Deborah O'Neill

Senator for New South Wales
- In office 8 March 1994 – 3 September 1998
- Preceded by: Kerry Sibraa
- Succeeded by: Steve Hutchins

Personal details
- Born: 10 January 1963 (age 63) Brisbane, Queensland, Australia
- Party: Labor (1980−2017, 2022−)
- Spouse: John Della Bosca
- Children: Two
- Education: University of Sydney
- Profession: Lawyer
- Website: ALP web page

Belinda Jane Neal (born 10 January 1963) is an Australian politician who currently serves as a councillor for Gosford West Ward on Central Coast Council since 2024.

She was a member of the Senate from 1994 to 1998, before later serving as the member for Robertson in the House of Representatives between 2007 and 2010.

== Early life ==
Neal was born in Brisbane on 10 January 1963. She graduated Bachelor of Laws from the University of Sydney, where she was president of the Students' Representative Council. Prior to entering parliament she worked as a legal officer for the Federated Ironworkers' Association of Australia from 1986 to 1987 and then as a solicitor in Gosford, New South Wales, from 1987 to 1994.

== Political career ==
Neal joined the ALP in 1980. She was a delegate to state conference in New South Wales from 1983 and to national conference from 1984. In July 1989, aged 26, she contested ALP preselection for the federal seat of Robertson with the support of her husband, assistant ALP state secretary John Della Bosca. She lost by only two votes to veteran state MP Frank Walker.

Neal served on the Gosford City Council from 1992 to 1994. In February 1994, she was nominated by the ALP to fill the casual vacancy caused by the resignation of former senate president Kerry Sibraa. Although she was ultimately endorsed unanimously, the preselection process was controversial amid claims that her husband had unfairly interfered in the ballot. One of her competitors Franca Arena said that the preselection had "developed into a farce".

After her appointment, Neal served as a senator until her resignation on 3 September 1998 to contest the House of Representatives seat of Robertson at the 1998 general election in which she was defeated by the incumbent, Jim Lloyd of the Liberal Party.

In the 2007 federal election she was again preselected as the Labor candidate for Robertson, and won the seat in a very tight contest, claiming victory on 5 December.

She lost preselection for the seat of Robertson on 6 March 2010, to challenger Deborah O'Neill, who lost the seat in the following election. On 29 July 2010 Neal announced that she would not recontest the seat at the 2010 federal election, but did not rule out a future in politics, saying that the Labor Party still had her full support. Her husband, John Della Bosca, announced on the same day that he was resigning from the New South Wales Legislative Council to become a campaign director for the National Disability and Carers Alliance, and assist in the establishment of a national disability insurance scheme.

In 2015 Neal attempted a comeback to Robertson but was defeated in the ALP preselection by Ann Charlton who was chief of staff to O'Neill.

In 2024, Neal was nominated as the lead candidate for Labor's ticket for the Gosford West Ward in the 2024 New South Wales local elections.

=== Incident at Iguana Joe's ===
In June 2008, Neal and her husband John Della Bosca were dining in a bistro called Iguana Joe's when they were reportedly involved in an incident with staff of the premises. Multiple witnesses provided sworn affidavits attesting that Neal and Della Bosca had been abusive to restaurant staff. Della Bosca stated that staff had been rude and threatening to them.

=== Labor expulsion and reinstatement ===
On 24 July 2017, officers of the Labor's New South Wales branch adopted the decision of the party's Internal Appeals Tribunal to expel Neal from the party, after the tribunal was instructed by the then General Secretary.The expulsion was overturned in 2022, allowing her to rejoin the party as a full member. Neal was awarded a life honour by Labor in 2024, in recognition of her efforts to the party.

=== Central Coast Council ===
In August 2024, Neal announced that she would contest preselection for Central Coast Council at the September 2024 local government elections. She was successful in her preselection bid and was chosen as the party's leader for the council, as well as the lead candidate in Gosford West Ward.

Parliament of Australia
Preceded by Jim Lloyd	Member for Robertson; 2007–2010	Succeeded by Deborah O'Neill
