= Lawrie McKinna =

Politician and soccer player (born 1961)

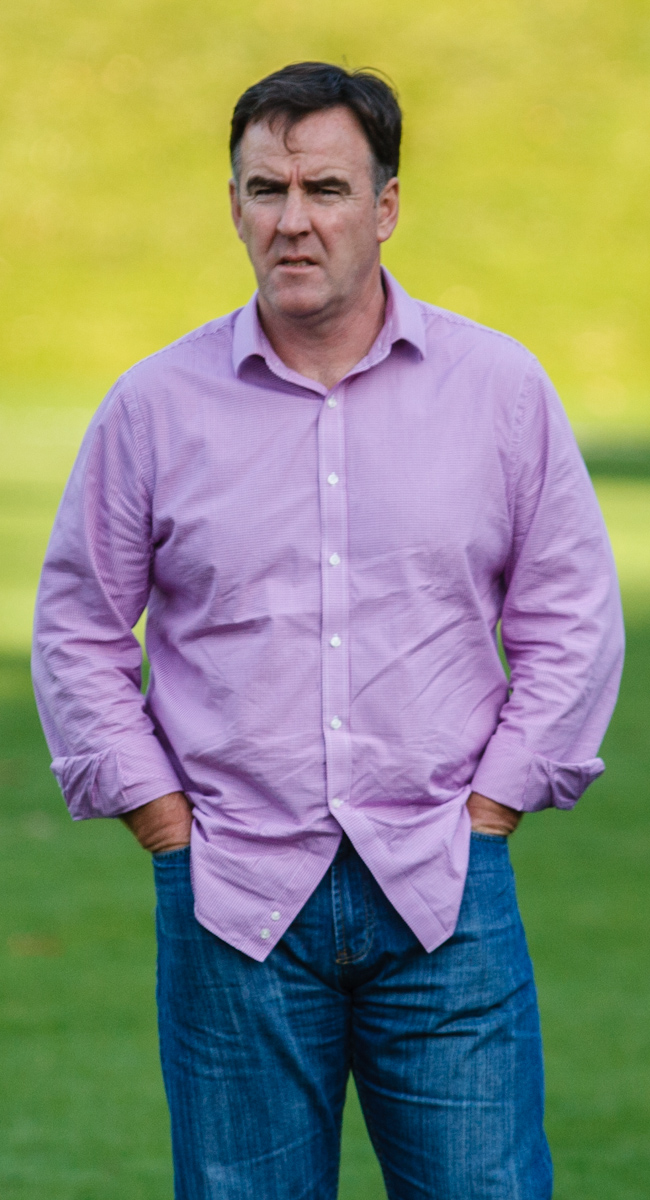

Mayor of Central Coast Council
- Incumbent
- Assumed office 8 October 2024
- Deputy: John Mouland
- Preceded by: Rik Hart (Administrator)

Councillor of Central Coast Council for Gosford East Ward
- In office 14 September 2024 – Present

Councillor of the City of Gosford
- In office 8 September 2012 – 12 May 2016

Mayor of the City of Gosford
- In office 24 September 2012 – 12 May 2016
- Deputy: Bob Ward; Jim Macfadyen; Craig Doyle
- Preceded by: Laurie Maher
- Succeeded by: Council abolished

Personal details
- Born: 8 July 1961 (age 65) Kilmarnock, Scotland
- Party: Independent
Association football career
- Position: Striker
Senior career*
Years	Team	Apps	(Gls)
1979–1982	Darvel		
1982–1986	Kilmarnock	87	(17)
1986	Box Hill		
1987	Heidelberg United	24	(6)
1988	APIA Leichhardt	25	(2)
1989–1990	Blacktown City	31	(4)
1990–1991	Wollongong City	5	(0)
1991–1993	Blacktown City	39	(25)
1993–1994	Newcastle Breakers	7	(0)
1994	Blacktown City	23	(7)
1995–1997	Hills United		
Managerial career
- 1992: Blacktown City (assistant)
- 1995–1996: Hills United
- 1997–1999: Sydney United (assistant)
- 1999–2002: Parramatta Power (assistant)
- 2002–2004: Northern Spirit
- 2005–2010: Central Coast Mariners
- 2011: Chengdu Blades
- 2011–2012: Chongqing Lifan
- 2016–2018: Newcastle Jets Youth
- 2018–2019: Newcastle Jets Youth (assistant)
- 2019: Newcastle Jets Youth
- 2019–2020: Newcastle Jets Youth (assistant)
- * Club domestic league appearances and goals

Lawrie McKinna (born 8 July 1961) is a Scottish-Australian politician and former soccer player and coach. He is currently serving as Mayor for the Central Coast Council and is serving for the East Gosford Ward, heaving led "Team Central Coast" at the 2024 election.

McKinna was elected as a councillor on the City of Gosford in 2012, and was elected by his fellow councillors as mayor following the elections. Lawrie was successful in gaining a seat, and was elected by his fellow councillors Mayor of Gosford City on 24 September, serving into that role until the council was abolished in 2016.

== Early life ==
McKinna was born in Galston in southwest Scotland.

== Playing career ==
McKinna began his career as a striker with local junior side Darvel and made his debut for Scottish Football League side Kilmarnock in 1982. He made 87 league appearances for Kilmarnock, scoring 17 times before moving to Australia in 1986 where he went on to play for several more clubs in the NSL and various state leagues.

== Management career ==
McKinna's coaching career began in 1992 with New South Wales side Blacktown City as assistant manager. In 1995 Hills United hired him as a player-manager. In 1997, he became assistant to David Mitchell with National Soccer League (NSL) clubs Sydney Olympic, then following Mitchell to Sydney United in 1998 and Parramatta Power in 1999.

He left Parramatta Power in 2002 to take over as manager of Northern Spirit. His first season as a NSL coach was promising and successful as he beat many accomplished coaches, and was awarded with the NSL coach of the year award after taking the Northern Spirit to their first finals campaign for three years.

=== Central Coast Mariners ===
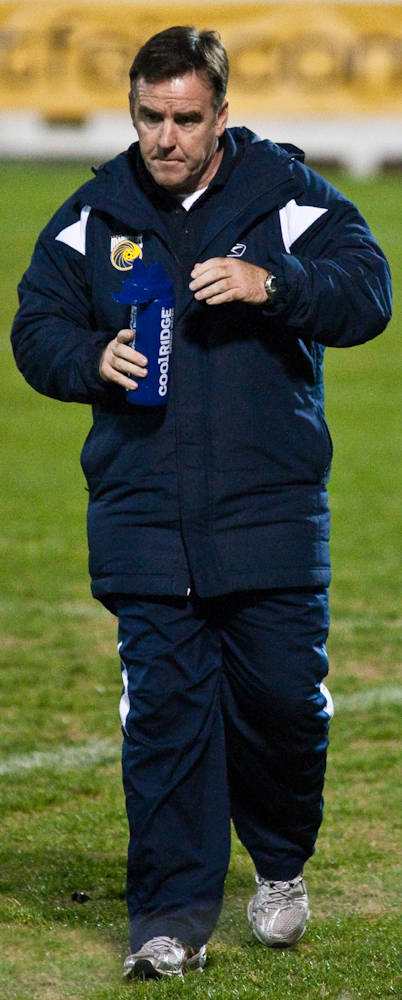
McKinna with Central Coast in 2009.

In 2005, he was named as manager of the new A-League club the Central Coast Mariners, earning the inaugural A-League coach of the year award after leading the Mariners to the grand final and winning the preseason cup. In May 2006 he signed a new five-year contract with the Mariners.

McKinna was popular in the community for his insistence that all the players at the club engaged in community activities. This became a hallmark of his tenure at the fledgling club.

In the 2006–07 season, McKinna gave an interview during which his team were struggling for on field success. Notably saying how it was frustrating for him when the press report losses in matches but don't mention the long-term injury's to the sides key players like Nik Mrdja, Andre Gumprecht and Noel Spencer. In the interview he also talked about his footballing coaching licenses and mentions that he would be preparing to take his "Asian 'B' license" course soon.

On 9 February 2010, it was announced that McKinna will take over as the Football and Commercial Operations Manager for the Mariners from the 2010–11 season, with Graham Arnold replacing him as head coach.

=== Chengdu Blades ===
Chinese Super League club Chengdu Blades have shown interest in McKinna taking over the reins as manager of the first team on 18 March 2011. A day later, he was appointed as the head coach of Chengdu Blades a club known to have the lowest operating budget in the CSL.

On 15 August, it was confirmed by McKinna via his Twitter account, that he had resigned from his position as manager at the Blades. He cited off-field, back room issues as a major reason for his decision, which contributed to the Blades poor 2011 CSL season, in which at the time of McKinna's departure had seen them only win only twice, conceding 30+ goals, whilst only scoring 13, and the club at the bottom of the ladder after just 20 matches.

=== Chongqing Lifan ===
On 2 December 2011, it was announced that McKinna had signed a one-year contract with China League One side Chongqing Lifan. On 15 April 2012, he announced he was leaving the club after a disagreement with the board.

=== Central Coast Mariners ===
On 4 May 2012, it was announced that Lawrie would become the new Director of Football for the Central Coast Mariners. A position that he took on again temporarily for two months in 2014.

=== Newcastle Jets ===
In June 2016, McKinna was appointed chief executive of the Newcastle Jets.

== Political career ==
McKinna was elected a councillor of Gosford City Council in September 2012 and nominated as Mayor at the first council meeting.

In the 2013 Australian election, McKinna ran as an independent candidate for the seat of Robertson. Lawrie unsuccessfully stood as a candidate in the September 2013 federal election for the seat of Robertson. His campaign was backed by John Singleton to the tune of $380,000. While receiving 8.7% of the vote, Singleton and McKinna controversially decided the outcome of the seat by directing preference votes to Liberal Party candidate Lucy Wicks. Wicks formally thanked Lawrie and Singleton in her maiden speech in parliament.

== Managerial statistics ==
As of February 2010

Team	Nat	From	To	Record				
Team	Nat	From	To	G	W	D	L	Win %
Central Coast Mariners	(Australia)	2005	9 February 2010	129	43	37	49	33.33
Total				129	43	37	49	33.33

== Honours ==
=== Player ===
APIA Leichhardt

- NSL Cup: 1988

=== Manager ===
Central Coast Mariners

- A-League Championship runner-up: 2006, 2008
- A-League Premiership: 2007–08
- A-League Challenge Cup: 2005; runner-up: 2006

Individual

- NSL Coach of the Year: 2002–03
- A-League Coach of the Year: 2005–06

Civic offices
Preceded by Laurie Maher	Mayor of the City of Gosford; 2012–2016	Council abolished
