= 2017 Central Coast Council election =

Local election in Australia

- 9 September 2017

All 15 seats on Central Coast Council 8 seats needed for a majority

	First party	Second party	Third party
			IND
Party	Labor	Liberal	Independents
Last election	5 seats	6 seats	6 seats
Seats won	6	4	3
Seat change	▲1	▼2	▼3
Popular vote	57,265	46,751	32,279
Percentage	30.2%	24.7%	17.0%
Swing	▲7.0	▼6.5	▼12.6
	Fourth party	Fifth party	Sixth party
	NEW		STL
Party	NEW Inds.	Greens	STL
Last election	Did not exist	1 seat	2 seats
Seats won	2	0	0
Seat change	▲2	▼1	▼2
Popular vote	19,774	14,834	10,986
Percentage	10.4%	7.8%	5.8%
Swing	▲10.4	▼1.6	▼0.8
- Results by ward
Largest party before election
N/A
Subsequent largest party
Labor

The 2017 Central Coast Council election was held on 9 September 2017 to elect 15 councillors to Central Coast Council. The election was held as part of the statewide local government elections in New South Wales, Australia.

This was the first election for the council after it was formed in 2016 from a merger of the City of Gosford and Wyong Shire.

The Labor Party won the most seats out of any party, winning six out of 15.

== Background ==
Central Coast Council covers the entire Central Coast region, which has a population of 327,736 as of 2021. This makes it the third-most-populated LGA in New South Wales, behind only Blacktown and Canterbury-Bankstown.

The council was formed on 12 May 2016 as a "super council" after the state government merged the City of Gosford and Wyong Shire. It is composed of five wards, each electing three councillors, totalling 15 councillors for the entire LGA.

== Candidates ==
A total of 93 candidates contested the election.

Central Coast NEW Independents endorsed candidates in three wards (Gosford East, Gosford West and Wyong), while Next Generation Independents ran a ticket in one ward (Gosford East).

== Results ==
2017 New South Wales local elections: Central Coast
Party	Votes	%	Swing	Seats	Change
Labor	57,265	30.2	+7.0	6	▲1
Liberal	46,751	24.7	−6.5	4	▼2
Independents	32,279	17.0	−12.6	3	▼3
Central Coast NEW Independents	19,774	10.4	+10.4	2	▲2
Greens	14,834	7.8	−1.6	0	▼1
Save Tuggerah Lakes	10,986	5.8	−0.8	0	▼2
Fighting for the Forgotten North	4,012	2.1		0	
Next Generation Independents	2,789	1.5		0	
Animal Justice	544	0.3	+0.3	0	Steady
Sustainable Development	407	0.2	+0.2	0	Steady
Formal votes	189,641	92.3			
Informal votes	15,893	7.7			
Total	205,534	100		15	
Registered voters / turnout	250,818	75.6			

=== Budgewoi ===
2017 New South Wales local elections: Budgewoi Ward
Party	Candidate	Votes	%	±%
Labor	1. Doug Vincent (elected 1); 2. Jillian Hogan (elected 2); 3. Rowen Turnbull	16,387	43.3	+12.2
Liberal	1. Garry Whitaker; 2. Clive Sargeant; 3. Rhiannon Beckers	6,307	16.7	−11.0
Independent	1. Greg Best (elected 3); 2. Maree Best; 3. Amelia Best	6,154	16.3	
Fighting for the Forgotten North	1. Julie Watson; 2. Peter Harris; 3. Gary Blaschke	4,012	10.6	
Greens	1. Sue Wynn; 2. Greg Simmonds; 3. Anna Durkin	2,938	7.8	−1.4
Save Tuggerah Lakes	1. Helaine Taylor; 2. Cheryl Deguara; 3. Steve Beton	1,633	4.3	
Independent	Michael McCarthy	433	1.1	
Total formal votes		37,864	91.2	
Informal votes			8.8	
Turnout			82.2	

=== Gosford East ===
2017 New South Wales local elections: Gosford East Ward
Party	Candidate	Votes	%	±%
Liberal	1. Rebecca Gale-Collins (elected 1); 2. Kerryanne Delaney; 3. Colin Marchant	14,165	37.4	+0.3
Labor	1. Jeff Sundstrom (elected 2); 2. Victoria Collins; 3. Jim Macfadyen	8,412	22.2	+2.9
Central Coast NEW Independents	1. Jane Smith (elected 1); 2. Mitchell Lawler; 3. Sue Chidgey	4,977	13.1	
Greens	1. Stephen Pearson; 2. Robina Sinclair; 3. Terry Jones	3,819	10.1	−0.1
Next Generation Independents	1. Claire Braund; 2. Diane Bull; 3. Danielle Habib	2,789	7.4	
Save Tuggerah Lakes	1. Patrick Aiken; 2. Gary Lindahl; 3. Denis Whitnall	1,973	5.2	
Independent	Carol Fortey	1,715	4.5	
Total formal votes		37,850	93.1	
Informal votes			6.9	
Turnout			81.3	

=== Gosford West ===
2017 New South Wales local elections: Gosford West Ward
Party	Candidate	Votes	%	±%
Labor	1. Richard Mehrtens (elected 1); 2. Vicki Scott; 3. Brad Ernst	9,694	25.6	+2.1
Liberal	1. Troy Marquart (elected 2); 2. Sue Dengate; 3. Jack Wilson	8,416	22.2	−11.7
Independent	1. Chris Holstein (elected 3); 2. Lorraine Wilson; 3. Bob Puffett	6920	18.3	
Greens	1. Kate da Costa; 2. Ruth Herman; 3. Wendy Rix	3,835	10.1	−0.7
Central Coast NEW Independents	1. Gary Chestnut; 2. Farren Thornycroft; 3. Lisa Wriley; 4. Jean MacLeod	3,676	9.7	
Independent	1. Gabby Greyem; 2. Helen Macnair; 3. Sarah Rimmer	6,920	7.8	
Save Tuggerah Lakes	1. Carl Veugen; 2. Daniel Johnson; 3. John Caska	1,380	3.6	
Animal Justice	Skyla Wagstaff	544	1.4	
Independent	Christine Keene	414	1.1	
Total formal votes		37,837	91.9	
Informal votes			8.1	
Turnout			81.6	

=== The Entrance ===
2017 New South Wales local elections: The Entrance Ward
Party	Candidate	Votes	%	±%
Labor	1. Lisa Matthews (elected 1); 2. Greg Ashe; 3. Margot Castles	10,481	27.7	+8.9
Liberal	1. Jilly Pilon (elected 2); 2. Deanna Bocking; 3. Brian Perrem	10,001	26.4	−1.0
Independent	Bruce McLachlan (elected 3)	7,859	20.7	
Greens	1. Cath Connor; 2. Doug Williamson; 3. Barbara Gorman	4,242	11.2	+3.7
Save Tuggerah Lakes	1. Lloyd Taylor; 2. Glenn Clarke; 3. Matthew Young	3,375	8.9	
Independent	Nathan Bracken	1,348	3.6	
Sustainable Development	Kylie Boyle	407	1.1	
Independent	Aaron Harpley-Carr	171	0.5	
Total formal votes		37,884	93.5	
Informal votes			6.5	
Turnout			82.5	

=== Wyong ===
2017 New South Wales local elections: Wyong Ward
Party	Candidate	Votes	%	±%
Labor	1. Kyle MacGregor (elected 1); 2. Ruth Punch; 3. Narelle Rich	12,291	32.2	+9.7
Central Coast NEW Independents	1. Louise Greenaway (elected 2); 2. Laurie Eyes; 3. John Wiggin	11,121	29.1	
Liberal	1. Chris Burke (elected 3); 2. Kishen Napier; 3. James Wood	7,862	20.6	−9.0
Independent	1. Doug Eaton; 2. Troy Stolz; 3. Phil Collis	4,094	10.7	
Save Tuggerah Lakes	1. Adam Troy; 2. Kaylene Troy; 3. Amber Davis	2,625	6.9	
Independent	Sean Hooper	213	0.6	
Total formal votes		38,206	91.6	
Informal votes			8.4	
Turnout			82.1	

== Aftermath ==
In October 2020, it was revealed that the council was unable to pay 2,000 staff, and the council had a debt of $89 million. On 26 October 2020, Liberal councillors Rebecca Gale-Collins and Troy Marquart resigned, stating they sought to "differentiat[e] themselves from those councillors wishing to show due cause to the minister as to why they should remain in local government".

On 30 October 2020, then-local government minister Shelley Hancock announced the immediate suspension of the council and the appointment of former senior public servant Dick Persson as the new interim administrator. At the commencement of the administration period, debt has reached just under $350 million.

Persson was succeeded as administrator by former acting CEO Rik Hart on 13 May 2021. As a result of being in administration, no election took place for Central Coast in 2021.

On 17 March 2022, the state government formally dismissed the council after a report on its financial management was tabled in the New South Wales parliament. Although there were initially plans to hold a new election in September 2022, these did not eventuate.
