= Woy Woy Shire =

Former local government area in New South Wales, Australia

Shire of Woy Woy New South Wales
- Population: 1,347 (1933 census)
  - Density: 10.836/km^{2} (28.065/sq mi)
- Established: 1 August 1928
- Abolished: 1 January 1947
- Area: 124.31 km^{2} (48.0 sq mi)
- Council seat: Woy Woy Council Chambers
- Region: Central Coast
- County: Northumberland; Cumberland
- Parish: Patonga, Kincumber, Broken Bay
LGAs around Shire of Woy Woy:
Erina	Gosford	Erina
Mooney Mooney Creek	Shire of Woy Woy	Erina
Hornsby	Hawkesbury River; Warringah	Broken Bay

The Shire of Woy Woy was a local government area on the Central Coast region of New South Wales, Australia, centred on the town of Woy Woy. The shire was proclaimed on 1 August 1928 as a result of the proclamation of the separation of the D Riding of Erina Shire and had its council seat at Woy Woy, but covered the majority of the Woy Woy peninsula including Woy Woy Bay, Umina, Blackwall, Kariong, Pearl Beach, and Patonga. Woy Woy Shire was abolished on 1 January 1947 with the reorganisation of local government in the Central Coast region following the end of the Second World War, with the council area amalgamated into Gosford Shire.

== Council history ==
=== Early history ===
The traditional Aboriginal inhabitants of the lands now known as the Brisbane Water were the Guringai people of the Eora nation. The Darkingung people occupied large areas inland west towards Rylstone, and north to Cessnock and Wollombi.

In 1840, the Brisbane Water Police District was proclaimed covering the area from the Hawkesbury River to Lake Macquarie and which administered local government under the control of magistrates. In 1843, the Brisbane Water District Council was proclaimed on the same boundaries as the Police District, and replaced the appointed magistrates with an elected council as part of an early attempt to establish local government administration throughout the colony. This experiment in local government was not very successful, with much public opposition focused on the issue of increased taxation, and a lack of oversight and faulty administration led to the collapse of many of these District Councils. The Brisbane Water District Council had ceased to exist by 1855, and the NSW Parliament passed the Municipalities Act in 1858, which allowed for the creation of Municipalities and Boroughs if a petition of as few as 50 signatures was presented to the government. However, no petition was ever sent from the residents of Brisbane Water to the government under this act, and local matters reverted to the police magistrates for determination.

Under the succeeding Municipalities Act, 1867, a petition was subsequently accepted in incorporate the Town of Gosford as the "Borough of Gosford" on 11 November 1886. The remaining area of the Brisbane Water Police District outside of Gosford continued to be administered by the police magistrates until 1906.

=== Shire of Erina ===
On 7 March 1906, this area became the Erina Shire, when it was proclaimed by the NSW Government Gazette along with 132 other new Shires as a result of the passing of the Local Government (Shires) Act 1905. On 16 May 1906, the Shire was divided in to three Ridings (A, B, C) and five temporary Councillors were appointed (John Bourke of Kincumber, John Martin Moroney of Woy Woy, Harold Stanley Robinson of Penang, Manasseh Ward of Gosford, and Alexander Wilkinson of Wyong). The Borough of Gosford amalgamated into Erina Shire, becoming F Riding, from 23 January 1908, and the Woy Woy Area became D Riding.

=== Creation of Woy Woy Shire ===
With the substantial size of Erina Shire covering the entirety of the Central Coast region, Woy Woy residents began to organise to separate from the shire and manage their own area, where in 1921, a group of ratepayers angered by what they saw as a general neglect of their local area, formed an organisation to work towards the separation of the Woy Woy Peninsula area from Erina Shire. On 27 April 1928 a proposal for separation was received and the Shire of Woy Woy was subsequently proclaimed, coming into effect on 1 August 1928. While initial discussion favoured "Brisbane Water Shire", "Woy Woy Shire" was eventually agreed upon. The new council was divided into three Ridings (A, B, C), with two councillors per riding, and a six-member provisional Council was appointed:

Riding	Councillor	Notes
A Riding	Charles Jefferis Staples	Managing director, Woy Woy
A Riding	Alfred Edwin Smith	Retired bank manager, Woy Woy
B Riding	Michael James Green	Builder, Woy Woy
B Riding	Henry Erwin Goulding	Retired, Woy Woy
C Riding	Jerry Mahoney	Bookmaker, Woy Woy Bay
C Riding	Ernest William Williams	Storekeeper, Patonga Beach

The first Provisional Council meeting was held at the Woy Woy Masonic Hall on 11 August 1928, and land developer and businessman Charles Jefferis Staples was elected as the first Shire President, with the Shire Clerk of Erina, Montague Ogden, appointed acting Shire Clerk until a new clerk could be appointed. In October 1928, Clifford Roy Thew, the Deputy Town Clerk of Drummoyne, was appointed as the first Shire Clerk.

The first elections were held on 1 December 1928, with Councillors Staples, Green, Smith and Williams were returned; Councillor Goulding was defeated by James William Morris, a photographer of Dulwich Hill, and Councillor Mahony did not contest the election and was replaced by William Herbert Winslow Bassan, a farmer of Woy Woy Bay.

During Staples' tenure as president, moves were made to construct a Council Chambers building in the centre of Woy Woy, which was designed by Clifford H. Finch, built by G. J. Richards, and officially opened on 14 March 1931 at the cost of £1845 (Woy Woy Library since 1948).

=== Administration ===
Following severe dysfunction from late 1939 in Woy Woy Shire Council, which was unable to meet or elect a president due to boycotts of councillors over a declining financial position, on 14 February 1940 the Minister for Local Government dismissed Woy Woy Shire Council and appointed Keith William Britton as Administrator. A subsequent investigation by the Administrator found the council's finances "unsound" and subject to an "insidious drift".

=== Brisbane Water County Council ===
Following significant debate about the provision of electricity undertakings across the Central Coast, on 16 October 1942 Woy Woy Shire combined with the Gosford Municipality and Erina Shire to form the Brisbane Water County Council to provide electricity to the combined area of the three councils. However a few weeks later, the council resolved to withdraw their representatives from the county council owing to controversy over the cost of electricity utilities across the whole region. The County Council operated as an electricity and gas supplier and retailer and was managed by representatives of the constituent councils. The County Council operated until its amalgamation with the Sydney County Council from 1 January 1980.

=== Amalgamation ===
In June 1945, Erina Shire resolved to investigate the reconstitution of local government on the Central Coast into two shires and following further discussions a formal proposal was presented to the Minister for Local Government, Joseph Cahill, in October 1945. Nevertheless, the proposal proved divisive, with Gosford and the Wyong section of Erina Shire in favour and the rest of Erina Shire and Woy Woy Shire opposed. The formal government inquiry subsequently supported the proposal and in April 1946, Cahill notified the councils of his intention to proceed.

In response, Woy Woy Shire held a plebiscite in July 1946 on the question which on a low turnout resolved to oppose amalgamation, a vote that Cahill considered a waste of public money considering the decision was already made. On 1 January 1947, all of Woy Woy Shire, part of Erina Shire, and the Municipality of Gosford formed Gosford Shire, and the remainder of Erina Shire formed Wyong Shire.

== Shire presidents ==
#	Shire President	Term start	Term end	Time in office	Notes
1	Charles Jefferis Staples	11 August 1928	9 December 1931	3 years, 119 days	
2	Michael James Green	9 December 1931	5 December 1934	2 years, 361 days	
3	Stewart Arlington Hall	5 December 1934	8 December 1937	3 years, 3 days	
4	William John Bullion	December 1937	14 February 1940	2 years, 68 days	
–	Keith William Britton (Administrator)	14 February 1940	7 December 1940	297 days	
5	William Baldwin	10 December 1940	December 1942	1 year, 356 days	
6	William Strumey Brooker	December 1942	December 1943		
7	Thomas Arthur Hutchinson	December 1943	December 1944		
–	Stewart Arlington Hall	December 1944	1 January 1947		

== Shire Clerk ==
Name	Term	Time in office	Notes
Montague Charles Beresford Ogden (Acting)	11 August 1928 – 24 October 1928	74 days	
Clifford Roy Thew	24 October 1928 – 13 November 1942	14 years, 20 days	
Frank D'Arcey	November 1942 – 1 January 1947	4 years, 49 days	
