= Jilliby State Conservation Area =

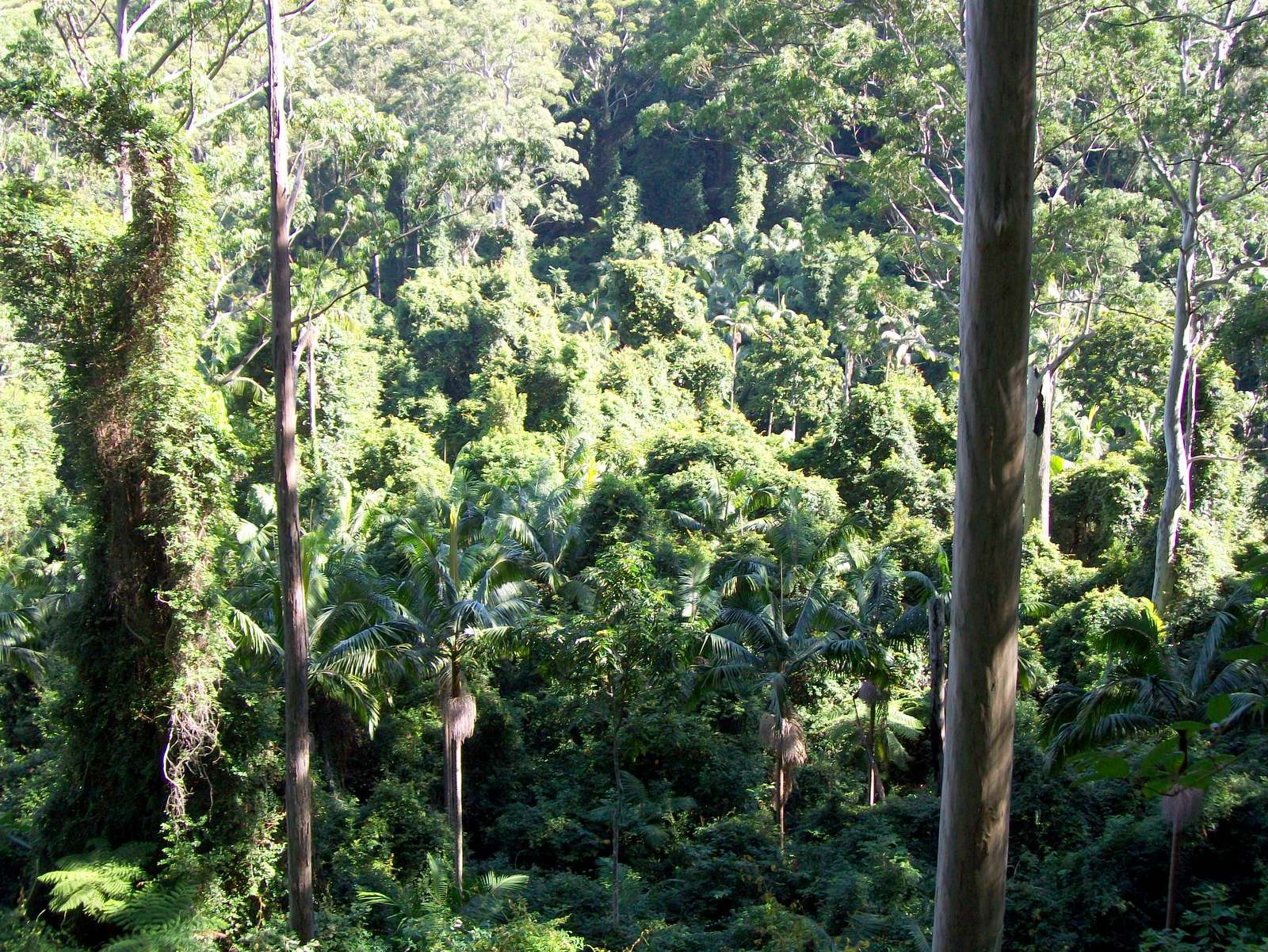
- Rainforest at Muirs Lookout

- Location within New South Wales
- Location: New South Wales
- Nearest city: Newcastle
- Coordinates: 33.095530°S 151.368326°E
- Area: 12,159 ha (46.95 sq mi)
- Governing body: NSW National Parks and Wildlife Service
- Website: Official website

Jilliby State Conservation Area is a protected area located north west of the Central Coast, New South Wales, in eastern Australia. A popular area for recreation, including bush walking, four wheel driving, picnics and horse riding. Birdwatching enthusiasts can enjoy watching over 130 species of birds here.

Jilliby State has an important cultural and historical role for the Aboriginal people.
