= Brisbane Water County Council =

Former county council in NSW, Australia

Agency overview
- Formed: 16 October 1942
- Dissolved: 1 January 1980
- Superseding agency: Sydney County Council

Brisbane Water County Council (BWCC) was a county council in the Australian state of New South Wales, responsible for electricity distribution. Named after the Brisbane Water, it was established on 16 October 1942 by a proclamation of the Governor of New South Wales made under the Local Government Act 1919. Its members (constituent councils) were Erina Shire, Woy Woy Shire and the municipality of Gosford. On 1 January 1980 it was merged into Sydney County Council and hence ceased to exist.

BWCC's headquarters, constructed in 1957, were at 50 Mann St, Gosford; after its abolition they became derelict and by 2017 had been occupied by squatters, delaying their planned demolition for redevelopment; an academic study cited the site as an example of "ruin porn". In 2024, the property development firm Aland purchased the site, with plans to build a mixed use development incorporating a supermarket, cafe, restaurant and three apartment buildings; the developer committed to retain the heritage facade of BWCC's old headquarters "to the best of its ability".
