= Canton Beach =

- Suburb
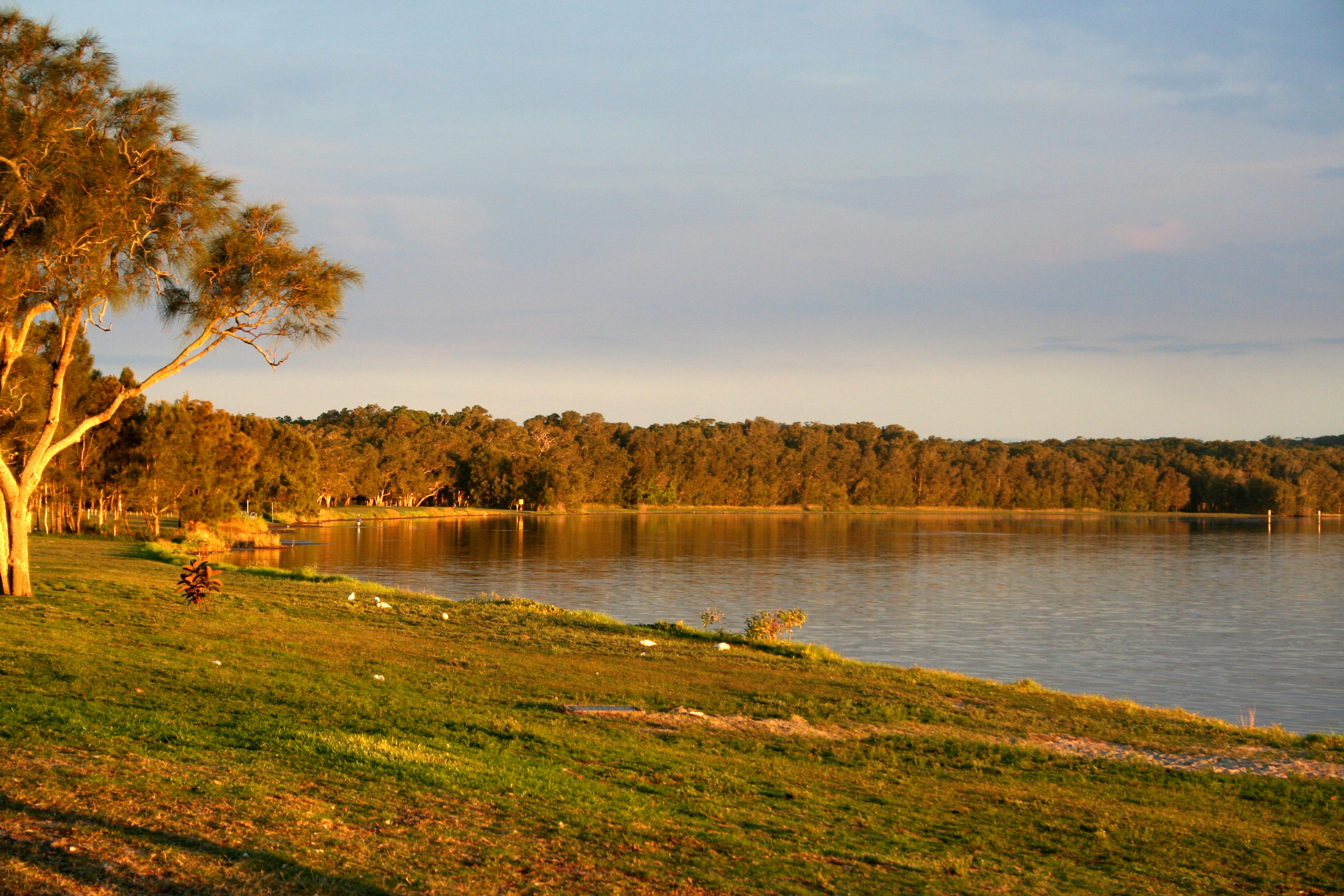
- Canton Beach in late afternoon sunlight

- Coordinates: 33°16.5′S 151°33′E
- Country: Australia
- State: New South Wales
- City: Central Coast
- LGA: Central Coast Council
- Location: 12 km (7.5 mi) NNE of The Entrance; 15 km (9.3 mi) E of Wyong; 35 km (22 mi) NE of Gosford; 54 km (34 mi) SSW of Newcastle; 112 km (70 mi) NNE of Sydney

Government
  - State electorate: Wyong
  - Federal division: Dobell

Area
  - Total: 1.1 km^{2} (0.42 sq mi)
- Elevation: 9 m (30 ft)

Population
  - Total: 2,494 (2001 census)
  - Density: 2,270/km^{2} (5,870/sq mi)
- Postcode: 2263
- Parish: Wallarah
Suburbs around Canton Beach
Toukley	Toukley	Norah Head
Tuggerah Lake	Canton Beach	Noraville
Tuggerah Lake	Magenta	Magenta

Canton Beach is a suburb located on the Central Coast of New South Wales, Australia, as part of the Central Coast Council local government area. It is next to Toukley which is a large residential and holiday town.

== History ==
- Late 1850s – Chinese fishermen worked the Tuggerah Lakes area, in particular, what is now known as Canton Beach. While not confirmed, it is believed this is where the name is derived from. It was a base for catching and curing fish that were then shipped to Queensland, the goldfields and back to China.
- 1856 – Edward Hargraves purchased Robert Henderson's holdings and built "Norahville". Wollombi Aboriginal Tribe members are known to have worked on the property. Some sources state that Hargraves "befriended" tribe members. Cattle were grazed as far as Buff Point and Elizabeth Bay.
- 1903 – Lighthouse built at Norah Head after many vessels were wrecked in the area.

== Demographics ==
As of the 2021 census, Canton Beach had a population of 1,202. The majority of residents (76.3%) were born in Australia, followed by England (6.2%) and New Zealand (0.9%). The most common ancestries were English (47.3%), Australian (35.4%), and Irish (14.6%). English was the primary language spoken at home for 88.5% of the population, while other languages included Polish (0.6%), Nepali (0.4%), and Spanish (0.2%).

The most common religious affiliations were No Religion (32.0%), Catholic (21.9%), and Anglican (21.6%). Christianity was the largest broad religious group, encompassing 61.6% of the population.

Aboriginal and/or Torres Strait Islander people comprised 5.6% of the population, above the national average of 3.2%.
