= Erina Shire =

Former local government area in New South Wales, Australia

Shire of Erina New South Wales
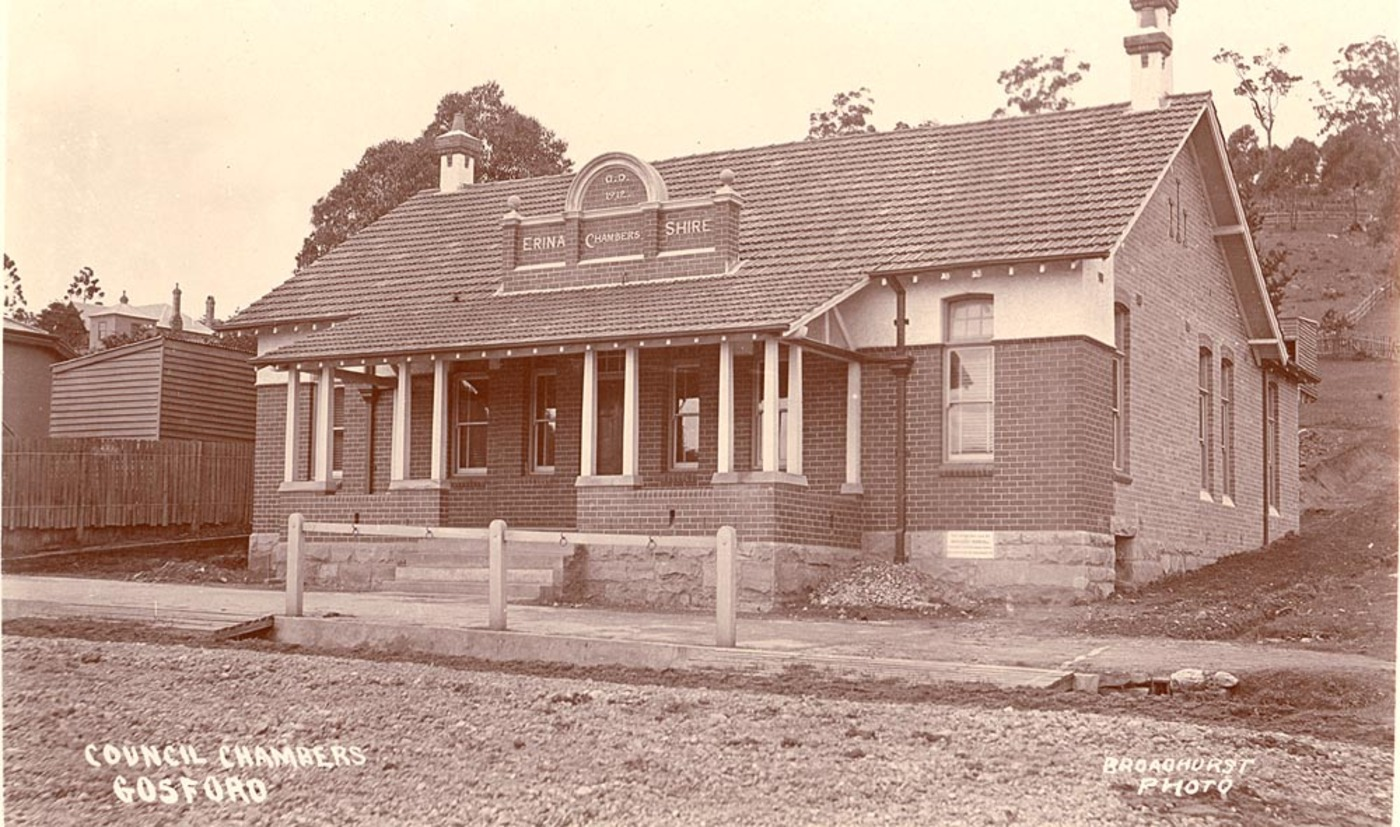
- Erina Shire Chambers on Mann Street, Gosford, built 1912.
- Population: 9,534 (1933 census)
- Established: 7 March 1906
- Abolished: 1 January 1947
- Council seat: Erina Shire Chambers
- Region: Central Coast
- County: Northumberland
LGAs around Shire of Erina:
Cessnock	Lake Macquarie	Lake Macquarie
Colo	Shire of Erina	Tasman Sea
Hornsby	Gosford	Woy Woy

The Shire of Erina was a local government area covering the majority of the Central Coast region of New South Wales, Australia. The shire was proclaimed on 7 March 1906 as a result of the passing of the Local Government (Shires) Act 1905 and covered most of the Central Coast region with the exception of the Town of Gosford, which had been incorporated in 1886.

The shire expanded on 23 January 1908, when the Municipality of Gosford merged into Erina Shire, but contracted on 1 August 1928 when D Riding separated to form Woy Woy Shire, and following a period of dysfunction in the mid-1930s, Gosford separated again from 24 October 1936. Erina Shire was abolished on 1 January 1947 with the reorganisation of local government in the Central Coast region following the end of the Second World War, with the council area split between Gosford Shire and Wyong Shire.

== Council history ==
=== Early history ===
The traditional Aboriginal inhabitants of the lands now known as the Brisbane Water were the Guringai people of the Eora nation. The Darkingung people occupied large areas inland west towards Rylstone, and north to Cessnock and Wollombi.

In 1811, the Governor of New South Wales, Lachlan Macquarie, gave the first land grant in the region to William Nash, a former marine of the First Fleet. No further grants were made in the area until 1821. In 1839, Governor Sir George Gipps named the town of Gosford after his friend, The Earl of Gosford.

In 1840, the Brisbane Water Police District was proclaimed covering the area from the Hawkesbury River to Lake Macquarie and which administered local government under the control of magistrates. In 1843, the Brisbane Water District Council was proclaimed on the same boundaries as the Police District, and replaced the appointed magistrates with an elected council as part of an early attempt to establish local government administration throughout the colony. This experiment in local government was not very successful, with much public opposition focused on the issue of increased taxation, and a lack of oversight and faulty administration led to the collapse of many of these District Councils. The Brisbane Water District Council had ceased to exist by 1855, and the NSW Parliament passed the Municipalities Act in 1858, which allowed for the creation of Municipalities and Boroughs if a petition of as few as 50 signatures was presented to the government. However, no petition was ever sent from the residents of Brisbane Water to the government under this act, and local matters reverted to the police magistrates for determination.

Under the succeeding Municipalities Act, 1867, a petition was subsequently accepted in incorporate the Town of Gosford as the "Borough of Gosford" on 11 November 1886. The remaining area of the Brisbane Water Police District outside of Gosford continued to be administered by the police magistrates until 1906.

=== Shire of Erina ===
On 7 March 1906, this area became the Erina Shire, when it was proclaimed by the NSW Government Gazette along with 132 other new Shires as a result of the passing of the Local Government (Shires) Act 1905. On 16 May 1906, the Shire was divided in to three Ridings (A, B, C) and five temporary Councillors were appointed (John Bourke of Kincumber, John Martin Moroney of Woy Woy, Harold Stanley Robinson of Penang, Manasseh Ward of Gosford, and Alexander Wilkinson of Wyong). The Temporary Council first met at Gosford Courthouse on 13 June 1906 and Manasseh Ward was elected as the chairman. The first election was held on 24 November 1906 and the first meeting of the elected nine-member Council was held at the Gosford Courthouse on 5 December 1906, with Councillor Ward elected to continue serving as the first Shire President.

=== Merger with Gosford ===
With the coming into effect of the Local Government Act, 1906, the Borough of Gosford became the Municipality of Gosford, as well as the power of Councils to petition the government to dissolve and merge with other Councils. In July 1907 a petition from the Municipality of Gosford was published in the Government Gazette requesting to merge with Erina Shire, the first Council to do so under the 1906 act. However, owing to objections from the Wyong Progress Association and the Erina Shire Council, a public inquiry was established by the Secretary for Public Works, where it was heard that the Gosford Municipality was in debt and desired to merge with Erina to resolve its financial issues. Despite objections, the commissioner returned a recommendation for the merger and a proposal for a six-ward model was considered and accepted at a conference held on 30 September 1907. The proposal for a six-ward Erina Shire with Gosford becoming F Riding was subsequently proclaimed and came into effect on 23 January 1908. The new Shire Council Chambers on Mann Street, Gosford, were officially opened on 4 May 1912.

=== Separation of Woy Woy ===
With the substantial size of Erina Shire covering the entirety of the Central Coast region, some local groups began to organise to separate from the shire and manage their own areas. This occurred in D Riding in particular, where in 1921, a group of ratepayers angered by what they saw as a general neglect of their local area, formed an organisation to work towards the separation of the Woy Woy Peninsula area from Erina Shire. On 27 April 1928 a proposal for separation was received and the Shire of Woy Woy was subsequently proclaimed on 1 August 1928.

=== Separation of Gosford ===
In March 1936, three Councillors of Erina Shire were dismissed from office for having held office while subject to a special disqualification, and it was also revealed that Council staff had not been paid since February. As the council could not meet due to lack of quorum, on 24 March 1936 the Minister for Local Government, Eric Spooner, dismissed the council and appointed an Administrator, B. C. Hughes. Spooner commissioned Hughes to undertake an inquiry into the administration of Erina Shire and, following a January petition from Gosford and Point Clare residents for a new Gosford municipality, also to investigate the question of the separation of Gosford from the Shire. The inquiry found in favour of a separation of Gosford, which was accepted by Spooner, and Erina Shire was divided again to re-form the Municipality of Gosford on 24 October 1936, including the areas of the former Gosford Municipality abolished in 1908 and also new areas from Narara to Woy Woy and Point Clare.

Following new elections held on 23 January 1937, the previous dysfunction of Erina Shire continued when at the first meeting following the election, the council was evenly divided on the selection of the shire president and was unable to resolve the matter. As a consequence, on 12 February 1937 the Minister for Local Government, Eric Spooner, dismissed the elected council again and reappointed Hughes as administrator. Hughes remained in office until elections could be held in December 1937.

Following significant debate about the provision of electricity undertakings across the Central Coast, including over the split between Erina Shire and Gosford, on 16 October 1942 Erina Shire combined with the Gosford Municipality and Woy Woy Shire to form the Brisbane Water County Council to provide electricity to the combined area of the three councils. The County Council operated as an electricity and gas supplier and retailer and was managed by representatives of the three councils. The County Council operated until its amalgamation with the Sydney County Council from 1 January 1980.

=== Formation of Gosford and Wyong Shires ===
In June 1945, Erina Shire resolved to investigate the reconstitution of local government on the Central Coast into two shires and following further discussions a formal proposal was presented to the Minister for Local Government, Joseph Cahill, in October 1945. Nevertheless, the proposal proved divisive, with Gosford and the Wyong section of Erina Shire in favour and the rest of Erina Shire and Woy Woy Shire opposed. The formal government inquiry subsequently supported the proposal and in April 1946, Cahill notified the councils of his intention to proceed. In response, Woy Woy Shire held a plebiscite in July 1946 on the question which on a low turnout resolved to opposed amalgamation, a vote that Cahill considered a waste of public money considering the decision was already made. On 1 January 1947, part of Erina Shire, all of Woy Woy Shire and the Municipality of Gosford formed Gosford Shire, and the remainder of Erina Shire north and east of Kulnura, Central Mangrove and Lisarow formed Wyong Shire.

== Shire presidents ==
#	Chairman	Term start	Term end	Time in office	Notes
1	Manasseh Ward	13 June 1906	5 December 1906	175 days	
#	Shire President	Term start	Term end	Time in office	Notes
–	Manasseh Ward	5 December 1906	23 January 1908	1 year, 49 days	
2	Octavius Benoni Emelius Conolly	10 March 1908	February 1909	1 year, 21 days	
3	Manasseh Ward	February 1909	February 1913		
4	Alexander Wilkinson	February 1913	12 February 1915		
5	James Kibble	12 February 1915	February 1916		
6	Frederick Richard Archbold	February 1916	22 November 1920		
7	Robert James Baker	22 November 1920	8 December 1922	2 years, 16 days	
8	Charles Jefferis Staples	8 December 1922	8 December 1924	2 years, 0 days	
9	William Alfred Chapman	8 December 1924	8 December 1926	2 years, 0 days	
10	Albert Charles Leslie Taylor	8 December 1926	24 March 1936	9 years, 107 days	
–	Bruce Carlyle Hughes (Administrator)	24 March 1936	23 January 1937	305 days	
Vacant		23 January 1937	12 February 1937	20 days	
–	Bruce Carlyle Hughes (Administrator)	12 February 1937	8 December 1937	299 days	
11	Arthur Edward Lillicrapp	8 December 1937	1 January 1947	9 years, 24 days	

== Shire Clerk ==
Name	Term	Time in office	Notes
Montague Charles Beresford Ogden	13 June 1906 – 1 January 1947	40 years, 202 days	
