= Australian Reptile Park =

Zoo located on the Central Coast in New South Wales, Australia

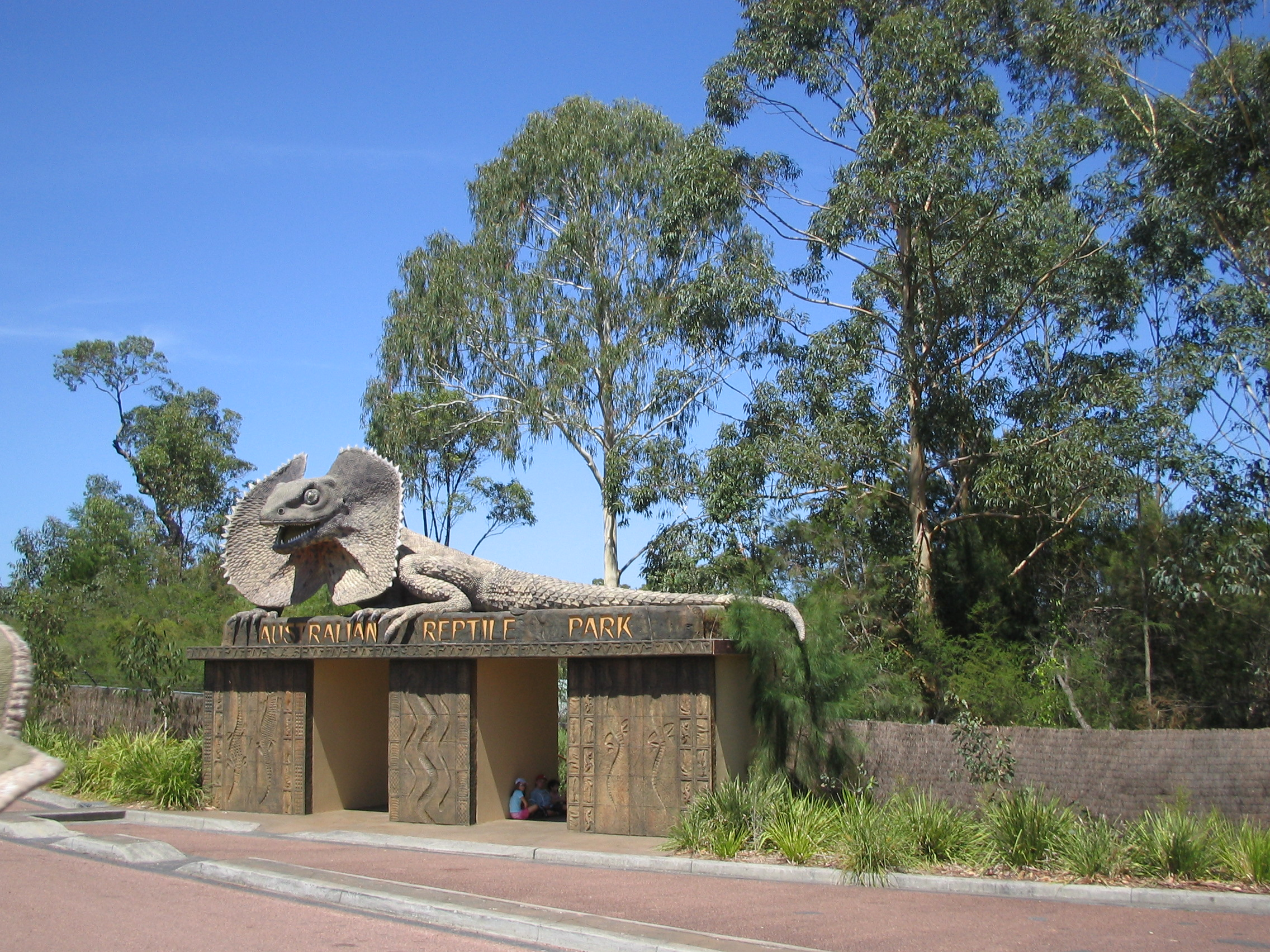
- Entrance to the Australian Reptile Park
- Interactive map of Australian Reptile Park
- 33.418247°S 151.277222°E
- Date opened: 3 October 1959 at Wyoming, New South Wales; moved and reopened at Somersby, New South Wales on 7 September 1996 (the Ocean Beach Aquarium which opened at Umina, New South Wales in 1950, was the original facility)
- Location: Somersby Central Coast New South Wales, Australia
- Land area: 22 acres (8.9 ha)
- No. of animals: 2,000+
- No. of species: 400+
- Annual visitors: 250,000+
- Memberships: Zoo and Aquarium Association NSW Zoo Association (NSWZA) NSW Fauna and Marine Park Association (NSW FMPA) Australasian Society of Zoo Keeping (ASZK)
- Website: www.reptilepark.com.au

The Australian Reptile Park is a wildlife sanctuary park in Somersby near Gosford on the Central Coast of New South Wales, Australia. The Park has one of the largest reptile collections in Australia, with close to 50 species on display. The wide variety of reptile species at the Park includes snakes, lizards (such as Komodo dragons), turtles, tortoises, tuataras, American alligators and crocodiles. The Australian Reptile Park is home to Ploddy The Dinosaur, an icon which can be seen when going north on the Pacific Motorway after crossing the Mooney Mooney Bridge.

In addition, the Park features Australian mammals such as kangaroos, wallabies, koalas, Tasmanian devils, bare-nosed wombat, quokkas, echidnas, and dingoes. Australian birds featured include cassowaries.

The park is heavily involved in snake and spider venom collection for use in the production of antivenom and is credited for saving the lives of thousands. It is an institutional member of the Zoo and Aquarium Association.

== History ==
1949 – The Park's founder Eric Worrell starts building Ocean Beach Aquarium at Umina Beach.

1950 – Ocean Beach Aquarium opens to the public. The aquarium includes a variety of marine fish, juvenile crocodile and snake and lizard pits. Worrell begins his snake venom milking work to contribute to the anti-venom manufacturing by the Commonwealth Serum Laboratories.

1955 – Ocean Beach Aquarium contributes to production of first antivenom to taipan envenomation.

1958 – Worrell moves his animal collection to Wyoming, a northern suburb of Gosford, and changes its name to Eric Worrell's Australian Reptile Park.

1959 – The Park first opens to the public on 3 October.

1962 – The Park contributes to availability of a full range of antivenoms.

1963 – "Ploddy" (originally named Dino), the dinosaur erected, considered by many the first of Australia's big things.

1968 – First nocturnal house in southern hemisphere opens.

1970 – Worrell receives MBE recognising his role in producing antivenom.

1970 – The Park begins providing funnel-web spider venom to Seqiris (formerly bioCSL) in the long process of developing an antivenom.

1972 – Captive breeding of cassowaries begins.

1980 – The long-awaited funnel-web spider antivenom is made available.

1985 – A management team, including future owners John and Robyn Weigel, is formed to steer the future of park, now named simply the Australian Reptile Park.

1987 – Worrell dies, aged 62.

1989 – 4.7-metre-long saltwater crocodile is imported from the Northern Territory on a special jet freighter, and named "Eric" in honour of Worrell.

1992 – John and Robyn Weigel become principal owners of the business, and make the decision to relocate the Park.

1996 – A parade is held in Gosford celebrating the relocation of Ploddy the dinosaur to its new home. Over 15,000 well-wishers lined the streets and cheered as Ploddy was ceremoniously transported from Wyoming to her new home in Somersby.

1996 – The Australian Reptile Park relocates to Somersby, NSW at a site adjacent to Old Sydney Town, and reopens on 7 September.

2000 – Just past midnight on 17 July, most of the main park building was destroyed when a faulty electrical wiring caused a fire. Park staff helped fire crews, but ultimately, the building was lost along with most of the hundreds of reptiles and frogs that had been maintained in the building. With a lot of work from the staff, and support from the city and from other zoos around Australia, the zoo was able to re-open its doors on 9 September 2000, just over seven weeks after the fire.

2007 – A main attraction to the park, Eric the crocodile dies. He is replaced by Elvis, a 4.5 metre male saltwater crocodile.

2008 – Park Director, John Weigel, is awarded Member of the Order of Australia for his contribution to Australian Tourism and the production of snake and spider antivenoms.

2011 – John Weigel founds Devil Ark, a conservation breeding facility for the endangered Tasmanian devil in the Barrington Tops that is now part of the larger Aussie Ark.

2013 – The Australian Reptile Park remains the sole supplier of terrestrial snake and funnel-web spider venom to Seqiris for the nation's antivenom program. Over its 60-year history, it is estimated that the Park has assisted in saving close to 20,000 lives.

2013 – In July, more than twenty reptiles were stolen from the Park. Lizards, geckos, snakes and one alligator were taken. A pair of Solomon Islands skinks were recovered in August.

2015 – Australian Reptile Park Director, Tim Faulkner, is named "Conservationist of the Year" for 2015 by The Australian Geographic Society.

2016 – Tim Faulkner and Liz Gabriel named as co-directors alongside John and Robyn Weigel.

2018 – New Komodo dragon exhibit opened. Home to two Komodo dragons named Kraken and Daenerys.

2018 – Australian Reptile Park wins NSW State Business of the Year awarded by the NSW Business Chamber.

2019 – The Park wins Best Major Attraction at the NSW Tourism Awards.

2019 – A new exhibit, housing a pair of endangered Goodfellow's tree-kangaroos, is opened.

2022 – In April, three Komodo dragon babies are successfully hatched at the park, first Komodo dragons to be born in Australia.

== Animals ==
List of species

Reptiles

- Alligator snapping turtle
- American alligator
- Australian water dragon
- Ball python
- Banded rock rattlesnake
- Blue-bellied black snake
- Brown tree snake
- Burmese python
- Cantil
- Central netted dragon
- Coastal taipan
- Common death adder
- Corn snake
- Cunningham's skink
- Diamond python
- Eastern bearded dragon
- Eastern blue-tongued lizard
- Eastern brown snake
- Eyelash viper
- Fiji crested iguana
- Freshwater crocodile
- Frilled lizard
- Galápagos tortoise
- Gila monster
- Green anaconda
- Green iguana
- Green tree python
- Honduran milk snake
- Hosmer's spiny-tailed skink
- Indian star tortoise
- Inland taipan
- Jungle carpet python
- King brown snake
- King cobra
- Komodo dragon
- Lace monitor
- Land mullet
- Leopard tortoise
- Mainland tiger snake
- Manning River turtle
- Mertens' water monitor
- New Caledonian giant gecko
- Perentie
- Pig-nosed turtle
- Red-bellied black snake
- Reticulated python
- Rhinoceros viper
- Rosenberg's monitor
- Rough-scaled python
- Saltwater crocodile
- Saw-shelled turtle
- Sheltopusik
- Shingleback lizard
- Solomon Islands skink
- Spencer's goanna
- Spotted python
- Stimson's python
- Tuatara
- Veiled chameleon
- Western diamondback rattlesnake

Amphibians

- Australian green tree frog
- Cane toad
- Green and golden bell frog
- Magnificent tree frog
- Northern corroboree frog

Arachnids

- Huntsman spider
- Mexican fireleg tarantula
- Mexican red-knee tarantula
- Mouse spider
- Queensland whistling tarantula
- Redback spider
- Sydney funnel-web spider
- White-tailed spider
- Wolf spider

Birds

- Australian boobook
- Australian king parrot
- Banded lapwing
- Bar-shouldered dove
- Barn owl
- Black-winged stilt
- Blue-faced honeyeater
- Blue-winged kookaburra
- Bush stone-curlew
- Cape Barren goose
- Common bronzewing
- Eastern grass owl
- Eclectus parrot
- Laughing kookaburra
- Major Mitchell's cockatoo
- Rainbow lorikeet
- Satin bowerbird
- Southern cassowary
- Tawny frogmouth
- Topknot pigeon
- Torresian imperial pigeon
- White-headed pigeon

Mammals

- Common wombat
- Dingo
- Eastern grey kangaroo
- Fat-tailed dunnart
- Feathertail glider
- Goodfellow's tree-kangaroo
- Greater bilby
- Grey-headed flying fox
- Kangaroo Island grey kangaroo
- Koala
- Lumholtz's tree-kangaroo
- Parma wallaby
- Quokka
- Red-tailed phascogale
- Short-beaked echidna
- Tasmanian devil
- Yellow-footed rock wallaby

Conservation Ark (access through private tours only)

- Broad-headed snake
- Broad-toothed rat
- Giant barred frog
- Hunter River turtle
- Littlejohn’s tree frog
- Manning River turtle
- Namoi River turtle
- New Holland mouse
- Southern stuttering frog

== Past attractions ==
=== Eric the crocodile ===
A crocodile named Eric, born in 1947 in Australia's Northern Territory, was featured for many years at the park. He was a star attraction and had a fan club of over 10,000 members across the world. Every year, Eric consumed his own body weight in various animals such as chicken, goat and fish.

Eric had been implicated in the disappearance of two indigenous children in the 1980s, and was captured for the safety of the community. He was first taken to Darwin Crocodile Farm, where he bit off the heads of two female crocodiles with whom he was supposed to mate, and lost his right rear foot in a duel with a fellow crocodile. In 1989, he arrived by special freighter jet at the Australian Reptile Park and became a major attraction. He was named after the Park's founder Eric Worrell, who had died in 1987.

Eric the crocodile died on 30 June 2007 from a systemic infection, exacerbated because staff couldn't treat him due to power outages caused by storms in the area. His vet, Peter Nosworthy, believes age made him susceptible to the infection, while his size made it impossible to administer intensive care. At 5.6m long and 700 kg, Eric was the largest crocodile in New South Wales at the time of his death. A memorial to Eric is now at the rear of the park.

== Education ==
Talks and presentations include Galápagos tortoise feedings, a reptile show, a Tasmanian devil talk, koala talk, spider talk, dingo talk, and alligator feeding.

The Australian Reptile Park also take hundreds of school groups into the Park throughout each year for syllabus-based animal and conservation education.

== Antivenom programs ==
=== Snake venom-milking program ===
Since the 1960s, the Australian Reptile Park has been the sole supplier of terrestrial snake venom for the purpose of making antivenom. It is estimated that 300 lives are saved by antivenom in Australia each year and since the program's inception, approximately 20,000 Australian lives have been saved by the program. The Australian Reptile Park is currently home to 250 venomous snakes that are a part of the venom program that are milked on a fortnightly basis.

==== Milking snakes for venom ====
Focused judgement and great dexterity are needed to obtain snake venom from the venomous species of snakes found in Australia. Keepers at the Australian Reptile Park use two different techniques depending on the species of snake.

For taipans, king brown, tiger snakes, and death adders, keepers position the snake's fangs to penetrate a latex membrane stretched over a glass beaker. The snake then bites onto the beaker and the venom is dropped into the beaker and collected.

For eastern brown snakes, a technique called "pipetting" is used. The procedure requires keepers to push a polypropylene pipette onto the snake's fang with the venom dropping into the pipette.

After drying, the venom crystals are carefully scraped from the beakers and pipettes for weighing and packaging. Trained staff, who work with the venom in its various stages of processing, work extremely carefully with the venom to ensure it is not contaminated.

==== Producing snake antivenom ====
Once the venomous snakes have been milked at the Australian Reptile Park, it is then freeze-dried and sent to Seqiris (formally bioCSL) in Melbourne to be made into antivenom.

The process at Seqiris starts with the snake venom being injected into Percheron horses. Over 250 horses take part in the antivenom program, all living the life of luxury. They undergo minimal stress during the inoculation and extraction processes. Inoculation is harmless for the horses and extraction is as simple as donating blood for humans.

The horses are given increasing doses of venom over a period of six-months (until they have built up sufficient antibodies to the venom). Blood is then drawn from the horse with the antibodies extracted from the blood, purified and reduced to a usable form – this becomes antivenom.

The antivenom taken from the horses is used to treat humans suffering from snakebite. Antivenom is injected into the human bloodstream, with the antibodies attacking the venom, neutralising its effects. The dose of antivenom given to a patient varies according to the species responsible for the bite and, when it can be ascertained, the amount of venom injected. The age and weight of the victim makes no difference to the dose of antivenom required in the treatment.

=== Funnel-web spider venom-milking program ===
Since the inception of the Australian Reptile Park's funnel-web spider antivenom program in 1981, zero deaths have been recorded due to a funnel web spider bite. The Australian Reptile Park's venom program houses over 2,000 spiders from baby spiderlings up to full grown adult male specimens; who are milked on a weekly schedule.

The Australian Reptile Park encourages the public to catch funnel-web spiders in their homes and backyards, if it is safe to do so, and bring the spiders to various drop-off locations in around the Central Coast, Sydney and Newcastle. These spiders will become part of the Park's funnel-web spider breeding and venom-milking programs.

==== Milking funnel-web spiders for venom ====
Spider keepers at the Australian Reptile Park must use steady hands and extreme focus to milk funnel-web spiders. Using a glass pipette on the end of a small vacuum, keepers encourage the funnel web spider to rear up in a defensive position and then gently suck the venom from the end of the spider's fangs.

Once all spiders have been milked, the venom is removed from the pipette and frozen until shipment to Seqiris, where the venom is made into antivenom.

==== Producing funnel-web spider antivenom ====
The process of turning venom into antivenom is long and tricky but not impossible. Once the funnel-web spiders have been milked at the Australian Reptile Park, the venom is frozen and sent to Seqiris in Melbourne, Victoria.

The Seqiris team inject very small amounts of the venom into rabbits, increasing slowly over a six-month period until the rabbit is able to withstand six-times the lethal dose. Blood is then drawn from the rabbit and the blood is spun in a centrifuge. The spinning separates the antibodies from the blood, and it is these antibodies that make antivenom.

== Television ==
=== Bondi Vet ===
The Australian Reptile Park was a frequent feature on Australian factual television series Bondi Vet from 2010 until the show's completion in 2016. The episodes usually involved director Tim Faulkner calling Dr. Chris Brown to the park, or taking an animal either to Brown's clinic or the closer clinic owned by Dr. Peter Nosworthy. As of 2014, Faulkner became a part of the regular cast with a segment airing in every episode. When the series was revived in 2019 as Bondi Vet: Coast to Coast, Faulkner was once again part of the cast.

=== The Wild Life of Tim Faulkner ===
The Australian Reptile Park is also shown in the spin-off show The Wild Life of Tim Faulkner, on Channel 9 and the National Geographic Channel, which focused primarily on Faulkner's animal-related activities.
