= Holt-Bragg Bridge =

Road bridge in New South Wales, Australia

- Coordinates: 33°25′08″S 151°17′10″E
- Carries: Old Pacific Highway
- Crosses: Piles Creek
- Locale: Somersby, New South Wales, Australia
- Named for: Adam Holt; Roslyn Bragg; Madison Holt; Jasmine Holt; Travis Bragg
- Maintained by: Central Coast Council

Characteristics
- Design: Arch bridge

History
- Constructed by: Roads & Traffic Authority
- Construction cost: $1.9 million
- Opened: 30 June 2009
- Replaces: Concrete culvert 1986-2007

Location
- Interactive map of Holt-Bragg Bridge

The Holt-Bragg Bridge is an arch road bridge that carries the Old Pacific Highway (B83) across Piles Creek at Somersby on the Central Coast, New South Wales, Australia. It was opened on 30 June 2009 as a replacement for the previous bridge that collapsed two years earlier during severe weather. The bridge is named in honour of the five people who perished when the bridge collapsed.

The Pacific Highway is the main road link from Sydney to Brisbane and travels alongside the coast. The section from Cowan to Kariong, where the Holt-Bragg Bridge is, follows a scenic winding route, however, with the majority of traffic using the Pacific Motorway. The original bridge was built around 1986, during the construction of the Calga to Somersby section of the Pacific Motorway. It was a concrete culvert bridge.

== Culvert collapse ==
On 8 June 2007 the Central Coast was battered by strong winds and torrential rain caused by an intense low pressure system a short distance out to sea. The damage as a result of these storms resulted in them being declared a natural disaster. At approximately 4pm the road above Piles Creek gave way, leaving a 5-metre-wide (16 ft) by 10-metre-deep (33 ft) fissure. The collapse of the road was not visible to motorists travelling and as a result the car fell into the creek. Holt, along with his wife Roslyn Bragg, their daughters Madison and Jasmine and nephew Travis Bragg were all killed.

A coroner's inquest was established to discover the cause of deaths. It found that the failure of the Roads & Traffic Authority (RTA) and Gosford City Council to take action or initiative to fix problems with the bridge led to the collapse.

Adam Holt was found by the coroner as being a hero. Only concerned with the welfare of his wife and children. He could have been saved, but told rescuers to help his wife and children.

The bridge was first identified as being in need of maintenance in 1984 when an RTA scientific officer had drawn attention to the corrosion of galvanised iron pipes used in the culvert. In 1995, responsibility for the road was transferred from the RTA to Gosford City Council; however, the problems with the section were not identified to council engineers. In April 2000 the bridge slumped, however nothing was done to alleviate the problem until 2002 when the council requested an estimation for a major reconstruction of the culvert. In 2004, pavement repairs triggered a request by the council to ask for quotes for concrete lining of the culvert with tenders called. However, the information was not entered into the record system and no follow up action was taken.

== Current bridge ==
To replace the collapsed culvert, a replacement bridge was constructed by the RTA and opened on 30 June 2009, at a cost of $1.9 million. Responsibility for maintenance of the bridge is with the Central Coast Council (formerly the Gosford City Council) since its opening. The RTA named the bridge the Holt-Bragg Bridge in memory of the deceased. Two bronze commemorative plaques are located at either end of the bridge on Somersby sandstone.
