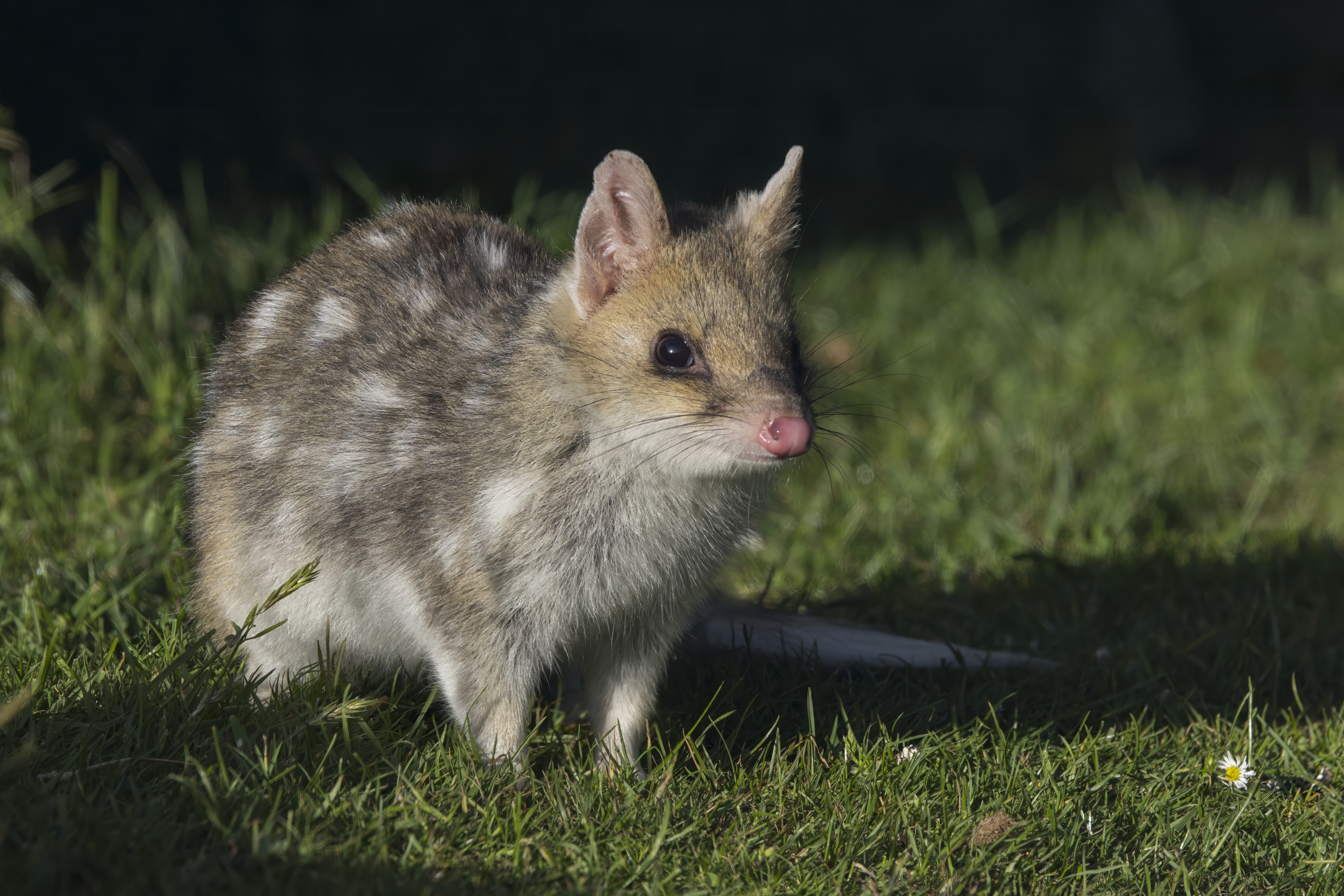
- Fawn morph in Dorset, Tasmania
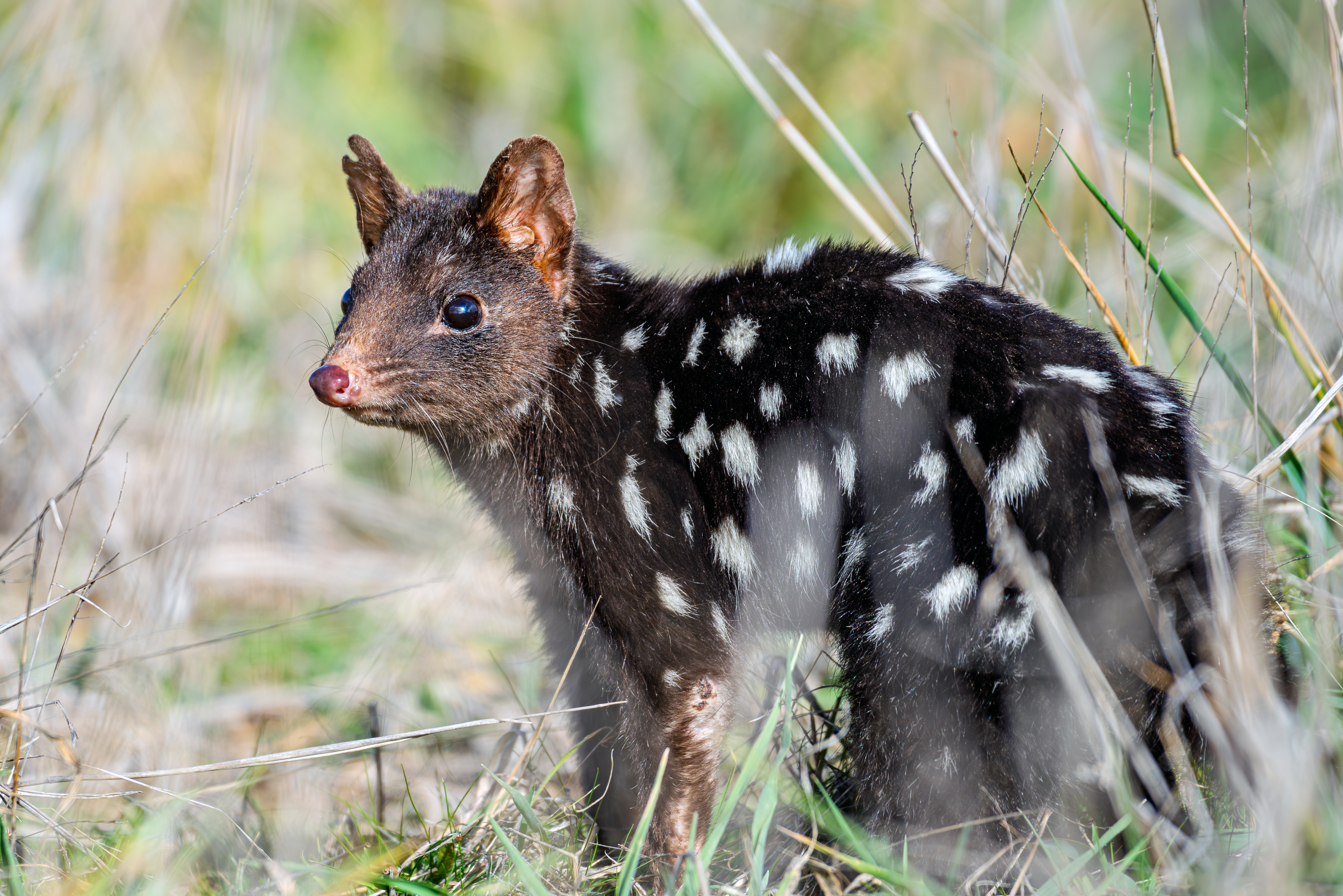
- Black morph in Mulligans Flat Woodland Sanctuary, Canberra, ACT

Conservation status
- Endangered (IUCN 3.1)

- Endangered (EPBC Act)

Scientific classification
- Kingdom: Animalia
- Phylum: Chordata
- Class: Mammalia
- Infraclass: Marsupialia
- Order: Dasyuromorphia
- Family: Dasyuridae
- Genus: Dasyurus
- Species: D. viverrinus

Binomial name
- Dasyurus viverrinus (Shaw, 1800)
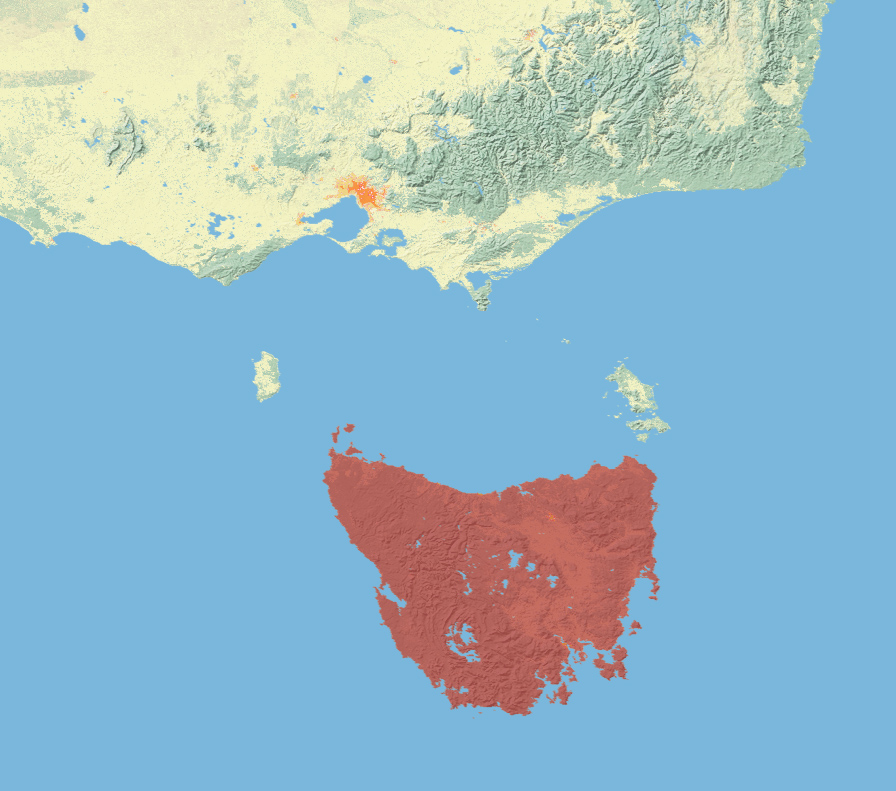
- Eastern quoll range, not including reintroduced populations in Victoria, New South Wales and the Australian Capital Territory

= Eastern quoll =

Species of marsupial

The eastern quoll (Dasyurus viverrinus, formerly known as the eastern native cat) is a medium-sized, carnivorous marsupial (dasyurid), and one of six extant species of quolls. Endemic to Australia, they occur on the island state of Tasmania, but were considered extinct on the mainland after 1963. The species has been reintroduced to fox-proof fenced sanctuaries in Victoria in 2003 and to the Australian Capital Territory in 2016.

== Taxonomy ==
The eastern quoll is a member of the family Dasyuridae, which includes most carnivorous marsupials. Its species name, viverrinus, indicates it is "ferret-like". No subspecies are recognised .

== Description ==
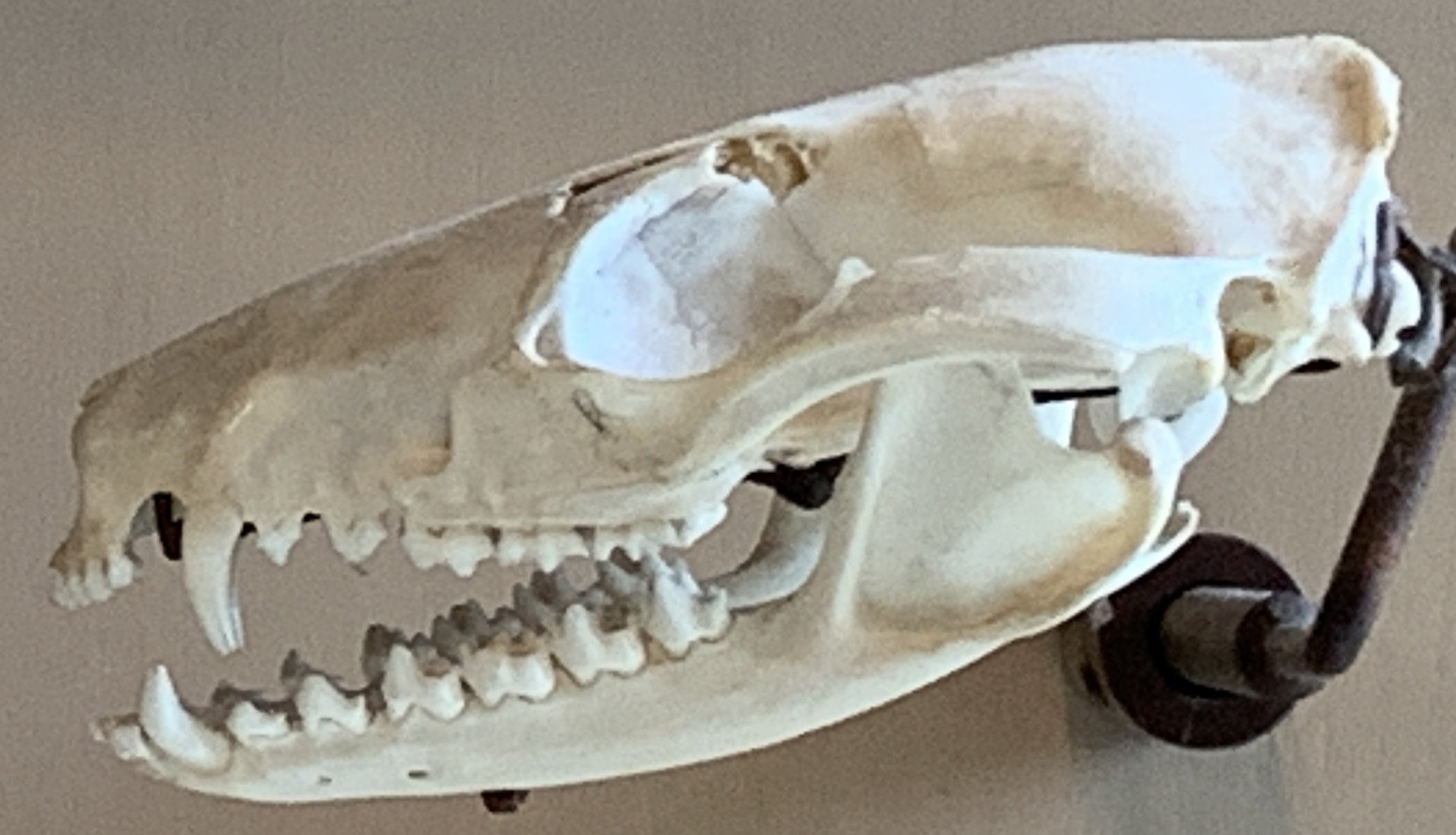
Eastern quoll skull

Eastern quolls are about the size of a small domestic cat, with adult males measuring 53 to 66 cm (21 to 26 in) in total length, including the 20 to 28 cm (7.9 to 11.0 in) tail, and having an average weight of 1.1 kg (2.4 lb). Females are significantly smaller, measuring 48 to 58 cm (19 to 23 in), including a 17 to 24 cm (6.7 to 9.4 in) tail, and weighing around 0.7 kg (1.5 lb). They have a tapering snout, short legs, and erect ears. They can be distinguished from all other species of quolls by the presence of only four toes, rather than five, on the hind feet, lacking the hallux.

They have a thick, light fawn or near-black coat covered by white spots, with off-white underparts stretching from the chin to the underside of the tail. Both fawn and black individuals can be born in the same litter, although in surviving populations, the former are about three times more common than the latter. The spots are 5 to 20 mm (0.20 to 0.79 in) in diameter and are found across the upper body and flanks, from the top of the head to the rump, but unlike some other species of quolls, do not extend onto the tail.

Females possess a relatively shallow, fur-lined pouch formed by lateral folds of skin. The pouch becomes enlarged during the breeding season and includes six to eight teats, which only become elongated and functional if one of the young attaches to them, regressing again after they leave the pouch. As with all quolls, the penis of the male bears an unusual fleshy appendage. The large intestine of eastern quolls is relatively simple, having no caecum and not being divided into a colon and rectum. An unusual feature of eastern quolls is the presence of an opening connecting the ventricles of the heart in newborn young, in addition to that connecting the atria found in all marsupials. Both openings close after a few days.

Eastern quolls exhibit biofluorescence under ultraviolet light. This was first photographed in the wild in 2025.

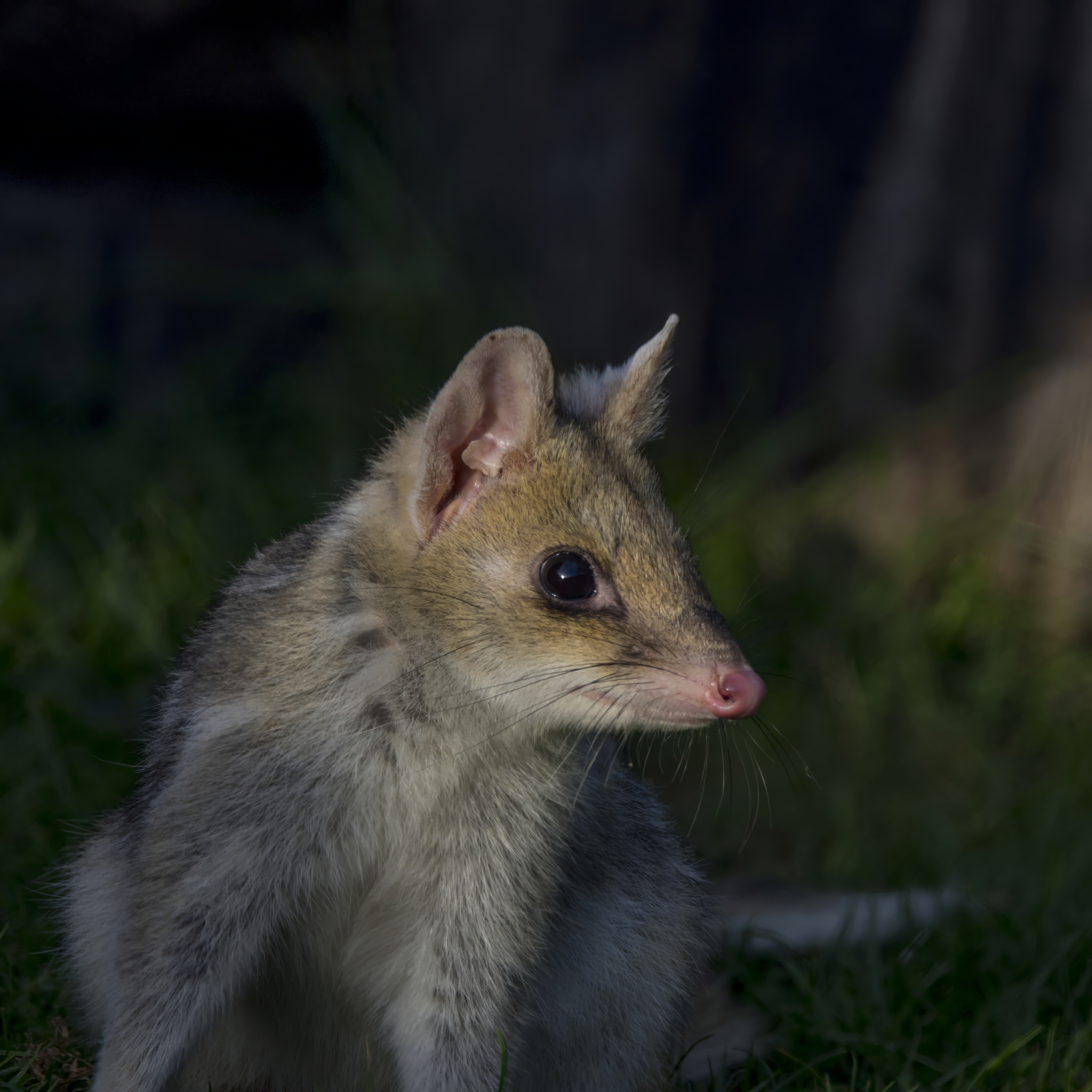
Fawn morph

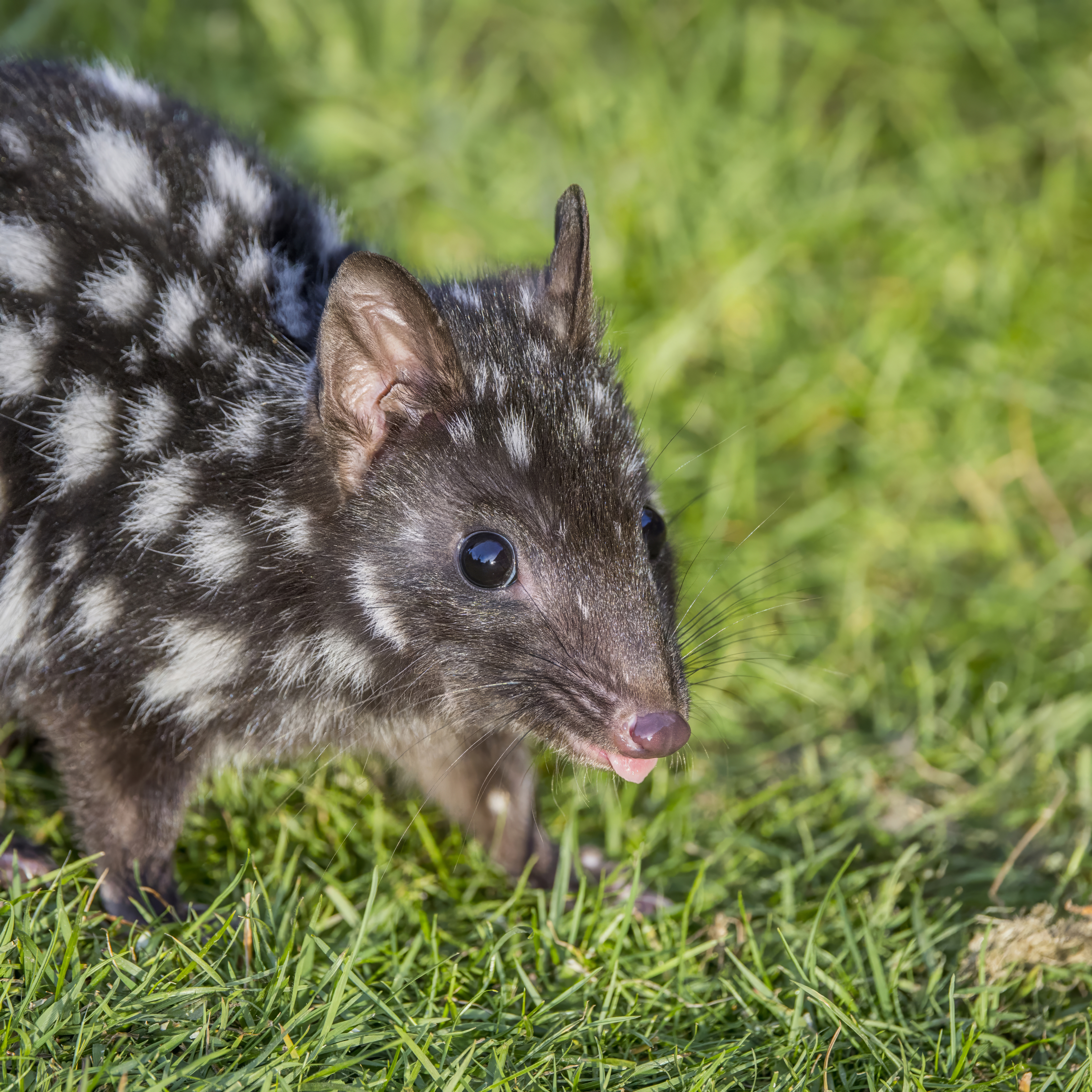
Black morph

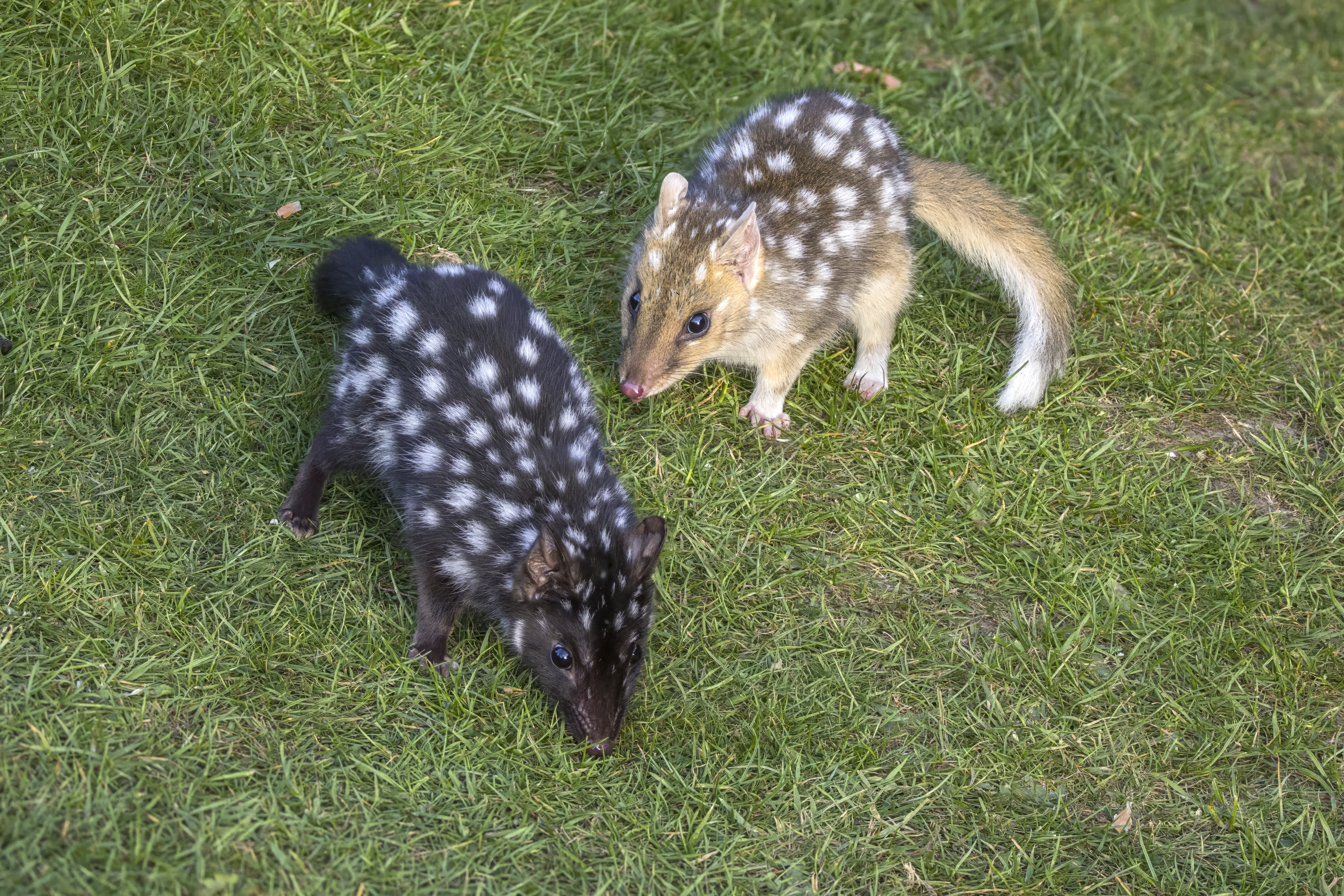
Black and fawn morphs

== Distribution and habitat ==
The eastern quoll was formerly found across much of southeastern mainland Australia, from the eastern coasts of South Australia, through most of Victoria, to the mid-north coast of New South Wales. The species was formerly abundant around Adelaide, particularly the Adelaide Hills, with a 1923 newspaper article noting its rapid decline and presumed extinction in the area during the preceding ten years.

It likely became functionally extinct across its entire mainland range by the early 1960s, but remains widespread but patchy in Tasmania and Bruny Island. Within Tasmania, eastern quolls inhabit rainforest, heathland, alpine areas, and scrub below 1,500 m (4,900 ft). They prefer dry grassland and forest mosaics, bounded by agricultural land, particularly where pasture grubs are common.

== Behaviour ==
Eastern quolls are solitary predators, hunting at night for their prey of insects, small mammals, birds, and reptiles. They have been known to scavenge food from the much larger Tasmanian devil. Although the majority of their diet consists of meat, they also eat some vegetable matter, including fruit during the summer, and grass year-round. Eastern quolls are prey for Tasmanian devils and masked owls.

Eastern quolls are nocturnal, and spend the day resting in dens, although they may also use natural rock crevices or hollow tree trunks. The dens often consist of no more than a simple, blind-ending tunnel, but are sometimes more complex, including one or more nesting chambers lined with grass. Each individual uses a number of dens, usually no more than five, which it alternates between on different days.

Eastern quolls are solitary and tend to avoid one another, but can form loose "neighbourhoods". Home ranges are typically around 35 ha (86 acres) for females, and 44 ha (110 acres) for males, with the latter increasing dramatically during the breeding season. Territories are scent marked, although scats are distributed randomly, rather than placed at specific latrines. Adults also ward off intruders by hissing and making coughing sounds and also make a sharp shriek that may be an alarm call. If intruders fail to leave quickly, then aggressive action escalates to chasing and wrestling with jaws while standing on their hind legs. Mothers and young have softer calls they use to maintain contact.

== Reproduction ==
The breeding season begins in early winter. The oestrus cycle lasts 34 days, although most individuals mate during their first cycle of the year. The female gives birth up to 30 young after a gestation period of 19 to 24 days. Of these, the first to attach themselves to the available teats will be the only survivors. The young remain attached to the teat for 60 to 65 days, begin to develop fur at around 51 days, open their eyes at about 79 days, and are fully weaned at 150 to 165 days. They reach sexual maturity in their first year and typically live for 2–3 years, but can live for up to 7 years in captivity.

== Conservation ==
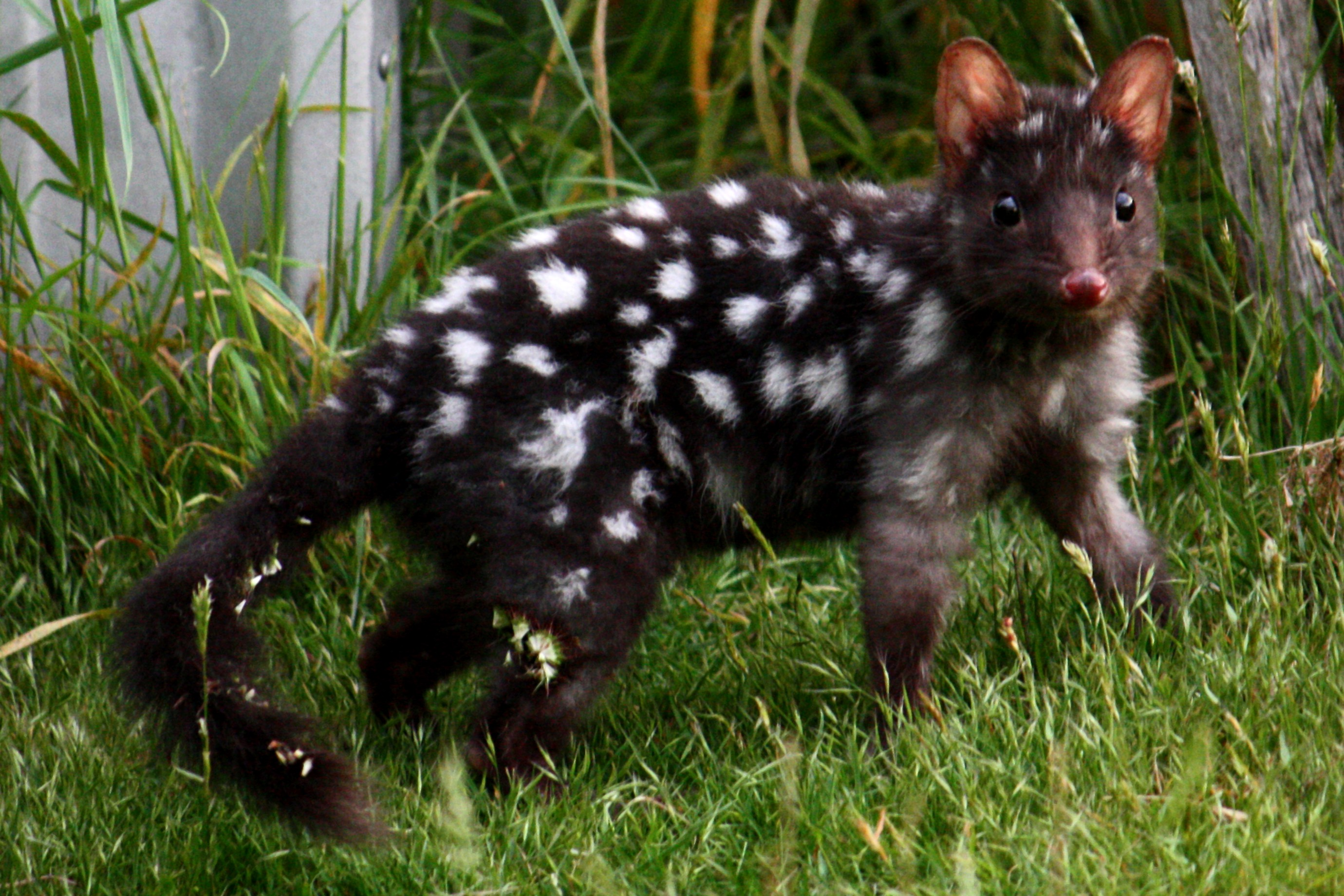
A black eastern quoll photographed in Tasmania

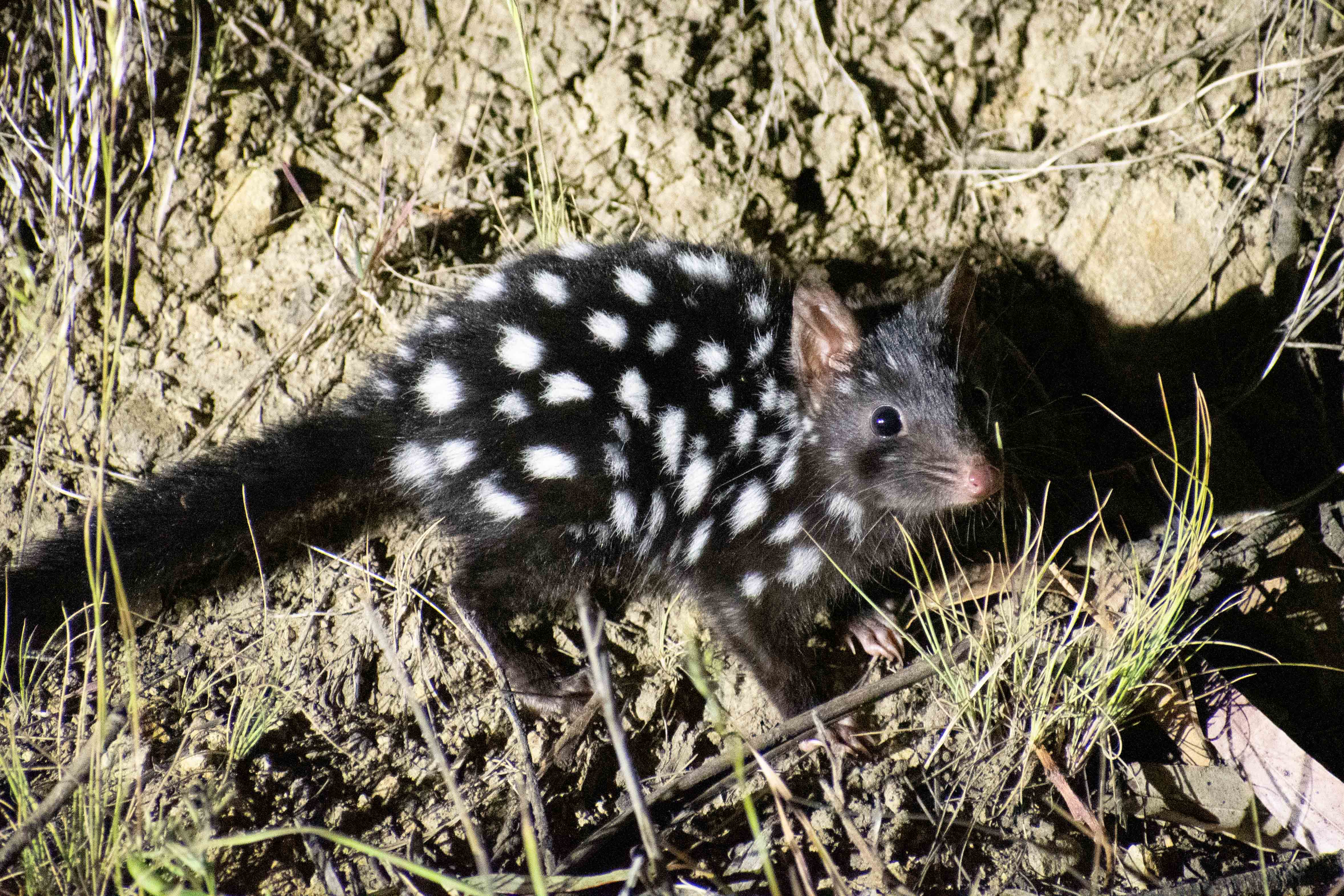
A dark morph eastern quoll pup

An Australia-wide group of institutions collaborate in the Tasmanian Quoll Conservation Program to manage the breeding of eastern and spotted-tailed quolls to directly support wild populations within Tasmania and eastern quoll conservation programs across Australia.

=== Tasmania ===
The eastern quoll likely became extinct on mainland Australia due to predation by introduced predators (red fox), but disease also has been implicated as a potential causative factor of decline. The lack of foxes in Tasmania likely has contributed to the survival of the species there; however, unseasonal weather events and predation by feral cats are thought to have contributed to possible recent and continuing population declines in Tasmania. The species is currently classified as endangered by the IUCN.

=== Mainland Australia ===
The last eastern quoll specimen on the mainland was collected as roadkill in Nielsen Park, Vaucluse in Sydney on 31 January 1963, however a taxidermied specimen provided to NSW National Parks and Wildlife Service in 2016 was reported to have been collected in 1989 or 1990 in the Gloucester region of NSW, indicating the species may have survived longer than the generally accepted 1960's decade of its mainland extinction. The NSW National Parks and Wildlife service reported numerous unconfirmed sightings and the species was reported photographed as recently as 2013 in the Nungatta district of NSW. Specimens collected in 2005 and 2008 west of Melbourne, Victoria, are likely connected with a nearby wildlife sanctuary, either as direct escapees, or the descendants of escapees from that facility.

=== Reintroductions ===
==== Victoria ====
In 2003, the eastern quoll was reintroduced to a 473 ha (1,170-acre) fox-proof fenced sanctuary at Mt Rothwell Biodiversity Interpretation Centre at Mount Rothwell in Victoria. The species has also been part of intensive reintroduction efforts at private sites, including a 2022 breeding population release coordinated by Nigel Sharp at Tiverton Farm.

==== Australian Capital Territory ====
In March 2016, a trial reintroduction of 16 eastern quolls from Mount Rothwell (Victoria), and Tasmania was conducted at Mulligans Flat Woodland Sanctuary in the Australian Capital Territory. Mulligans Flat is a public, 485 ha (1,200-acre) reserve surrounded by a predator-proof conservation fence. Founders from the first trial had a survival rate of 28.6%, with the majority of mortalities being associated with males dispersing beyond the predator-proof fence. Adopting an adaptive management approach, the second and third trials involved only releasing females (preferring those carrying pouch young), which resulted in increased survival (76.9% in 2017 and 87.5% in 2018).

==== New South Wales ====
Beginning in 2017, the Aussie Ark conservation program instituted a captive-breeding project within a 400 ha (990-acre) fox-proof fenced sanctuary, the Barrington Wildlife Sanctuary. As of 2022, 250 eastern quolls had been released into the enclosure, resulting in 63 joeys born in the 2022 breeding season.

In 2018, as a pilot program, 20 captive-bred eastern quolls were released into Booderee National Park on the south coast of New South Wales. The park was unfenced, but had undergone red fox baiting to prepare for the eastern quoll reintroduction. A second release of 40 eastern quolls was conducted in 2019. However, due to threats including predation by residual red foxes, domestic dogs, and road mortality, no founders survived beyond early 2021. In light of this failure and following the successful example of the Aussie Ark program, a second trial release of 19 eastern quolls was made into a 84 ha (210-acre) fenced area in the park.

A third captive-breeding program was established at the Conmurra Wildlife Sanctuary in Bathurst in 2025, with plans to expand its breeding population prior to releases of eastern quolls into the wild.
