= Aussie Ark =

- Date opened: 2011
- Location: Tomalla, New South Wales, Australia
- No. of species: 100+
- Major exhibits: Tasmanian devil
- Website: www.aussieark.org.au

Aussie Ark, formerly Devil Ark, is an animal preservation project based near the Barrington Tops of New South Wales, Australia. The wildlife sanctuary is called the Barrington Wildlife Sanctuary.

== History ==
The project was initially called Devil Ark, when its original goal was to only breed and preserve Tasmanian devils from an aggressive, non-viral transmissible and fatal disease known as devil facial tumour disease. The Devil Ark concept was discussed among zoos in 2006 and formally presented at the Tasmanian devil workshop held in Hobart in 2008, where most stakeholders, researchers and wildlife agencies were represented. The first founding Tasmanian devils were released at Devil Ark in January 2011 and Devil Ark was incorporated as a separate entity in November 2011.

== Description ==
The park is known as Barrington Wildlife Sanctuary. The project is registered as a charity and is fully dependent on voluntary donations.

== Tasmanian devils ==
A group of healthy Tasmanian devil individuals were raised in captivity at the Ark to produce offspring. The project aimed to create a set of one thousand genetically representative devils and is now a major focus of the insurance policy. Previously, Tasmanian devils held in zoos would rarely produce offspring in captivity. Aussie Ark is located on 1,350 m (4,430 ft) altitude in similar weather conditions as found in Tasmania at 500 hectares breeding facility at Ellerston station, just north of Barrington Tops in New South Wales; an initiative of the Australian Reptile Park. In 2013 it was announced that Devil Ark would open for tours on the first Saturday of every month. 2023 saw the 500th Tasmanian devil born through the project.

== Other species ==
Due to its success, the project expanded to include other species such as koalas, the Manning River turtle, eastern quolls and the brush-tailed rock wallaby, as well as creating more wildlife sanctuaries. In 2020, Aussie Ark helped reintroduce Tasmanian devils back to the Australian mainland, in the Barrington Tops of New South Wales.

Its breeding program of the eastern quoll reported a record number of joeys born in spring (November) 2022.

== In the media ==
The Ark and its animals have been featured on the wildlife television series Bondi Vet and its spin-off Outback Adventures with Tim Faulkner.
