= Somersby, New South Wales =

Coordinates: 33°21′54″S 151°17′06″E

Somersby Central Coast, New South Wales
- Population: 1,087 (2021 census)
- Postcode(s): 2250
- Elevation: 221 m (725 ft)
- Location: 14 km (9 mi) NW of Gosford; 77 km (48 mi) N of Sydney; 94 km (58 mi) SSW of Newcastle; 28 km (17 mi) W of The Entrance
- LGA(s): Central Coast Council
- Parish: Narara
- State electorate(s): Gosford
- Federal division(s): Robertson
Suburbs around Somersby:
Peats Ridge	Palm Grove	Ourimbah
Calga	Somersby	Narara
Mooney Mooney Creek	Mooney Mooney Creek	Kariong

Somersby is a semi-rural locality of the Central Coast region of New South Wales, Australia, to the northwest of Gosford along the Pacific Highway. It is part of the Central Coast Council local government area.

Somersby includes sections of the Brisbane Water National Park, within which Somersby Falls are located, as well as the Mount Penang Parklands which are used as a festival and exhibition centre. The Woolshed Function Centre, Australian Reptile Park, a small industrial area near the Kariong Interchange, two juvenile justice centres, and a primary school are features of Somersby. Old Sydney Town, now defunct, was a popular tourist destination in Somersby.

== Heritage listings ==
Somersby has a number of heritage-listed sites, including:

- Pacific Highway: Mount Penang Juvenile Justice Centre

== Gallery ==
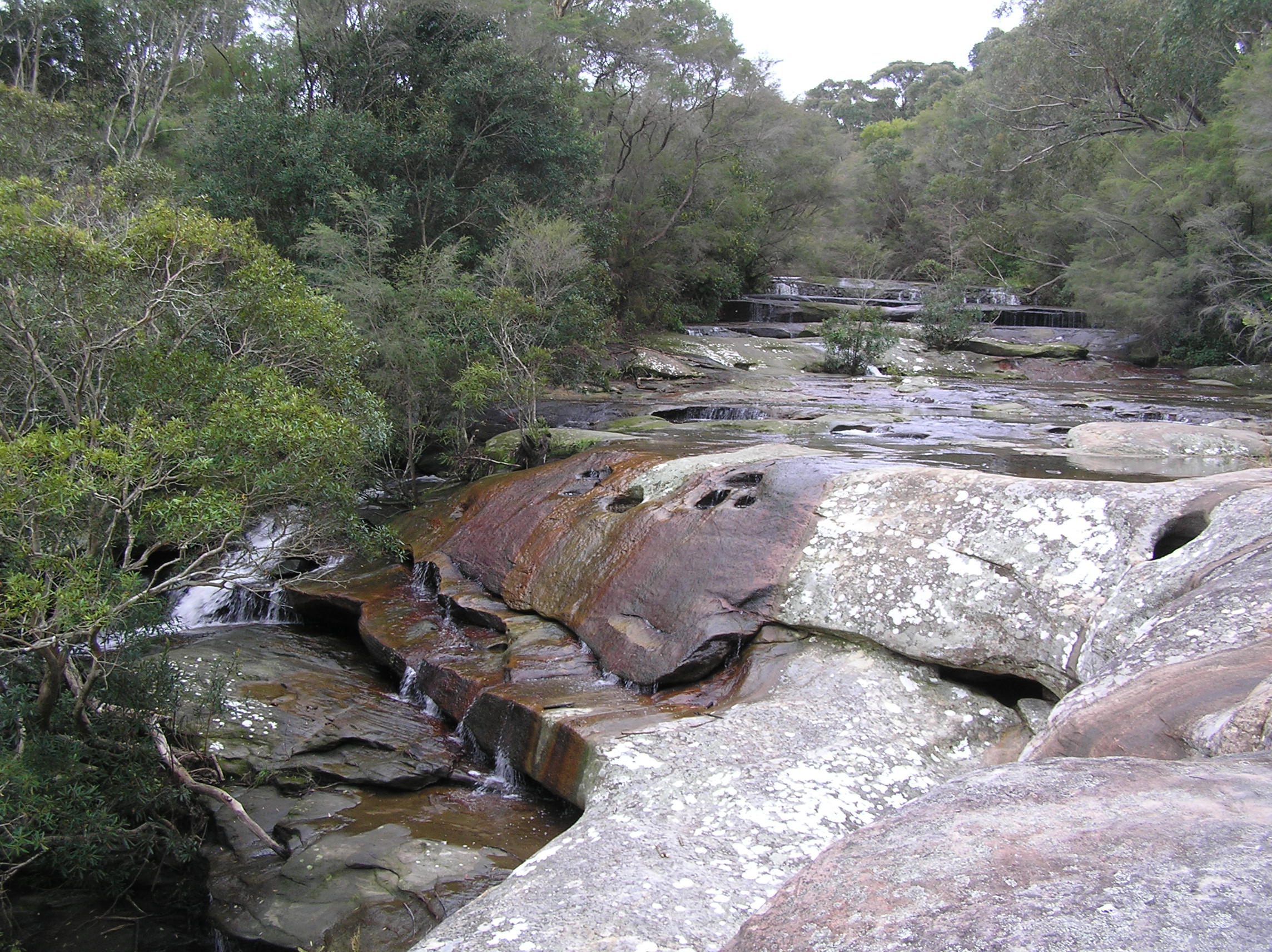
View north up the upper Somersby Falls

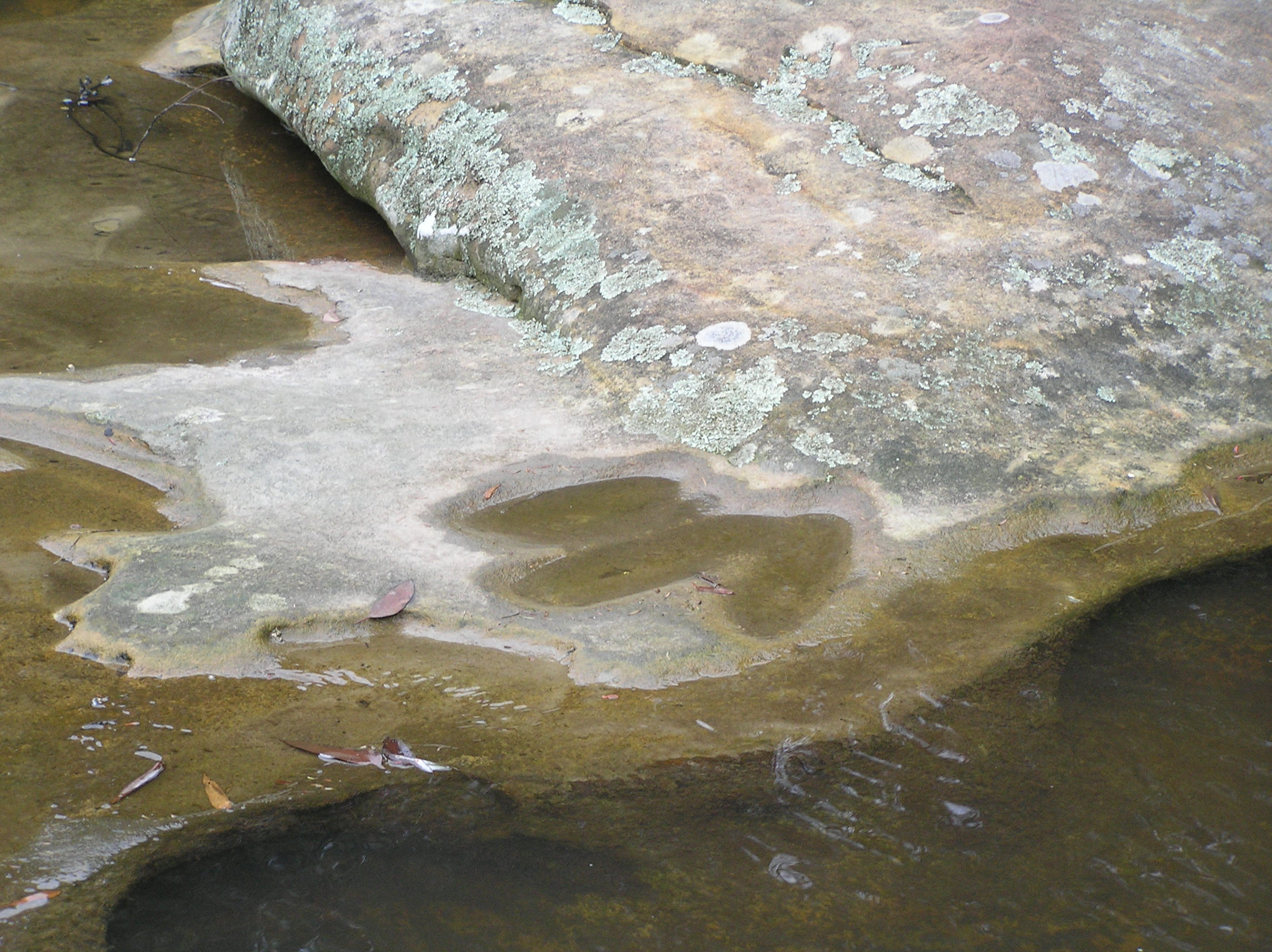
One of several sets of Aboriginal rubbing groves at the upper Somersby Falls

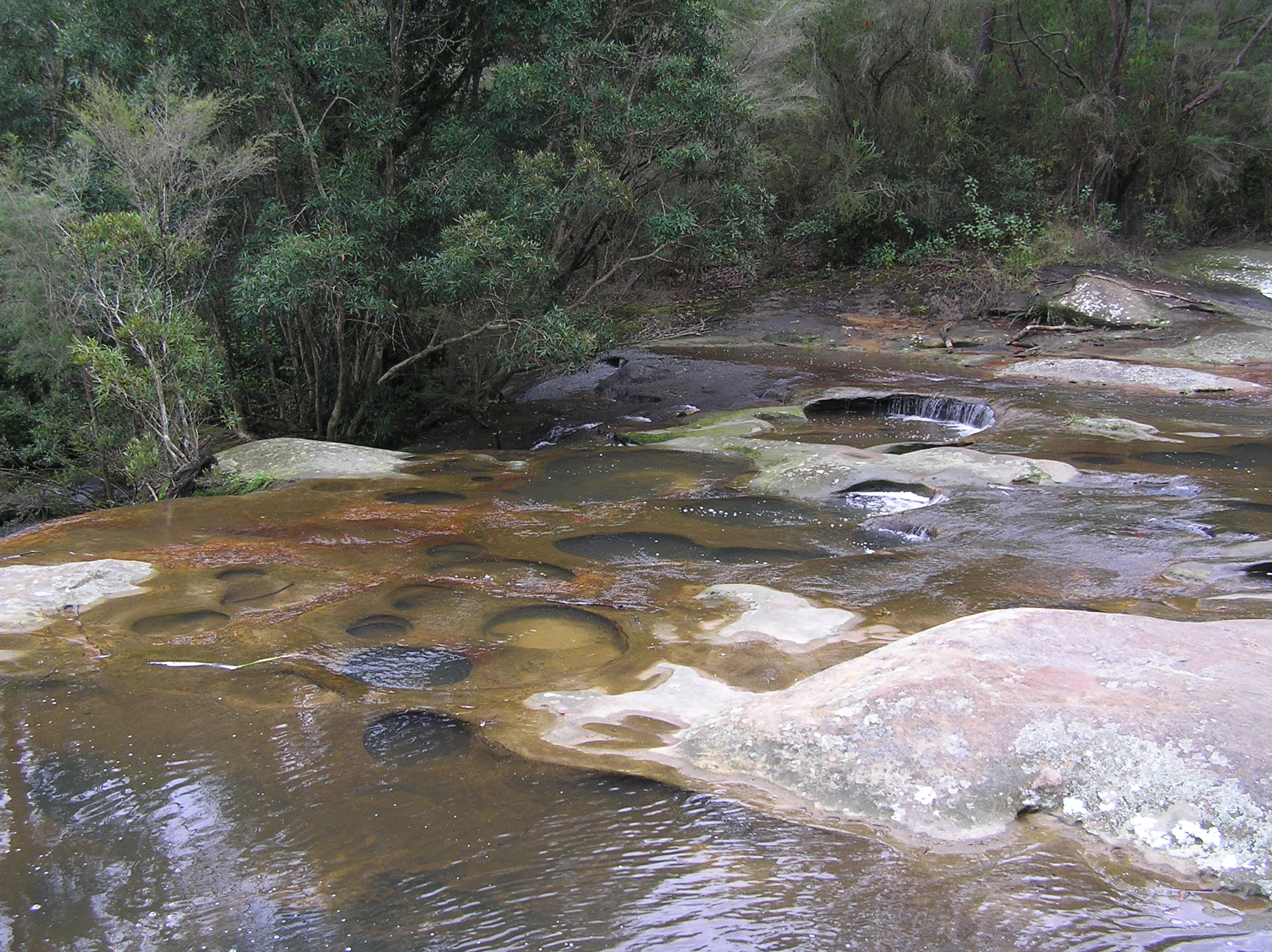
View across the upper Somersby Falls

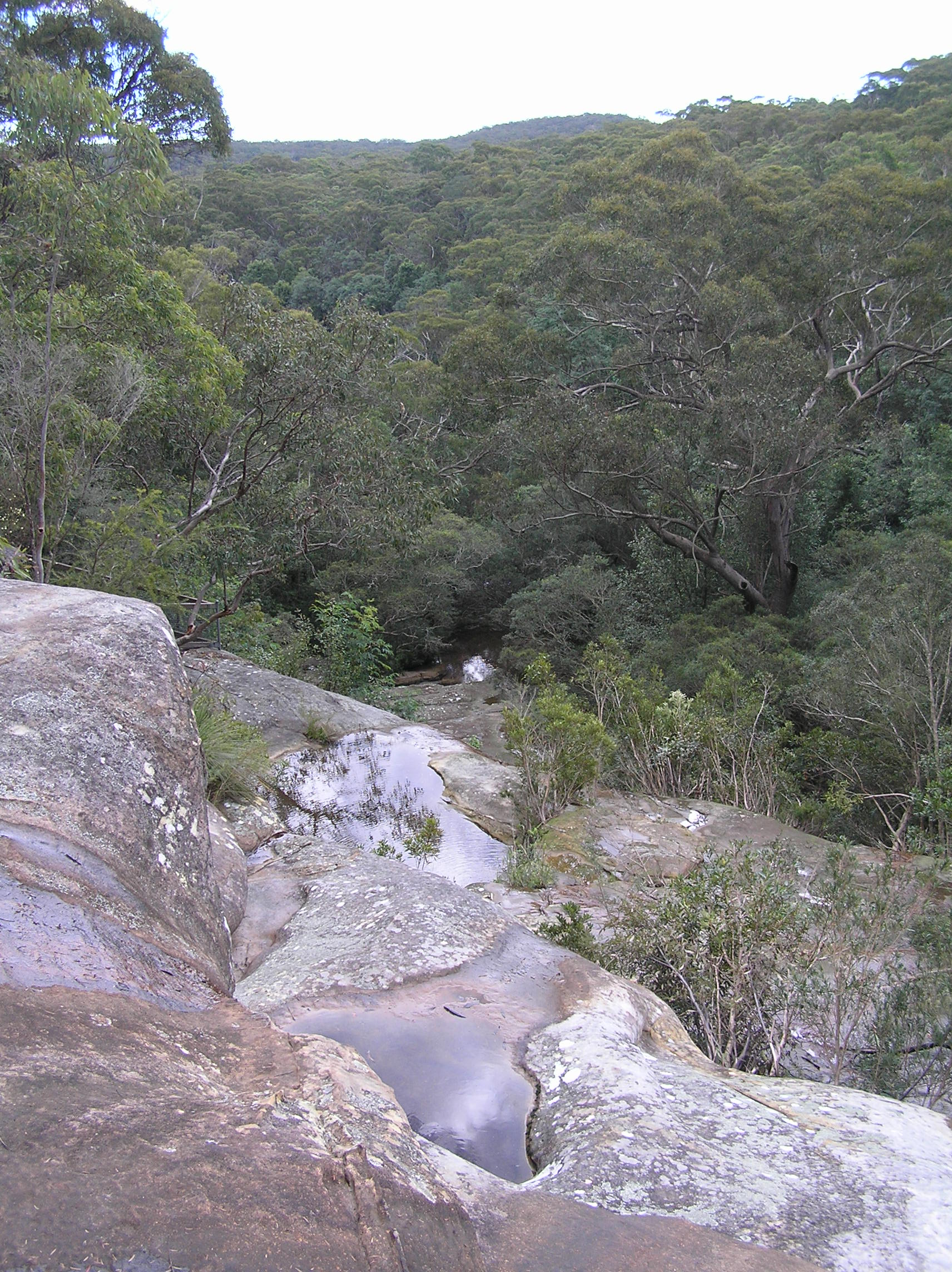
View west down from the upper Somersby Falls

== See also ==
- Holt-Bragg Bridge
