= Old Sydney Town =

Former theme park on the Central Coast, New South Wales, Australia

- Interactive map of Old Sydney Town
- Location: Somersby, New South Wales, Australia
- Coordinates: 33.41925°S 151.2755°E
- Opened: 26 January 1975
- Closed: 3 January 2003
- Owner: Australian Government (1975); Government of New South Wales (1976-1987); Westpac (1975–1987); Warwick Amusements (1987-2003)
- Slogan: "The Biggest Heritage Park in NSW"; "Enter and Step Back in Time"
- Operating season: All year round
- Area: 125 ha (310 acres)

Old Sydney Town was an Australian open-air museum and theme park which operated from 1975 until 2003 in Somersby on the New South Wales Central Coast. Once a living tribute to the early years of Sydney, the state capital's colonial settlement in the late 18th and early 19th centuries, it was complete with historical reenactments and authentic construction methods. The site is now used as a location for film and television production. It borders the Australian Reptile Park.

Robert Hughes, author of The Fatal Shore called the site "the only theme park in the world devoted to punishment and repression."

During its lifetime, the park had 6 million visitors.

== History ==
=== Development ===
During the 1960s, Sydney architect Frank Fox harboured aspirations of building Australia's Disneyland. However, upon a visit to Colonial Williamsburg, Fox decided it would be 'beaut' to construct a place that paid tribute to Australian history.

Fox viewed the Somersby site as an ideal location as the rocks, creek and terrain reminded him of early prints of Sydney Cove.

Fox and his family spent four years researching the pre-Macquarie period for the site and travelled around Australia looking for artefacts. Robert Irving, a senior lecturer at the University of New South Wales (UNSW) was also recruited to head up the site's permanent four-person research team. Irving assigned his 1972 first-year architecture cohort with designing and erecting the site's first buildings as a mandatory component of their studies. The UNSW Student Union Council condemned the Faculty of Architecture's use of unpaid labour for a private commercial enterprise.

Old Sydney Town was to be set out according to James Meehan's 1807 map of Sydney. The period was chosen as initial structures from when the first fleet landed (1788) were seen as too temporary in nature and buildings constructed after the Macquarie period would be too costly to recreate. The NSW Department of Lands enlarged Meehan's map of Sydney to 1: 1200 scale, while Adastra Airways was hired to undertake a 1: 1200 (1 inch = 100 ft) photogrammetric mapping of the Old Sydney Town site. The two maps were juxtaposed, with the Somersby site's dam positioned over Sydney Cove. Efforts were then conducted to reshape the park's terrain to replicate colonial Sydney.

Construction of all the site's planned 80 buildings was not intended to be completed by the official opening. The use of historically accurate building techniques was envisaged as a continuing attraction for visitors. At its peak, the park employed a range of specialised tradespeople to maintain authenticity like a thatcher, blacksmith and shipwright. It was also home to the only mechanical shingle maker in Australia. However, these traditional construction methods struggled with constant contact from visitors and weather, repairs were being needed ‘every three months'. Ultimately, the park would only construct roughly 30 of its planned structures.

Two boats were converted to be period replicas for the site; one of the first Brig built in Sydney, the Perseverance and the HMS Lady Nelson (1798).

The Australian Reptile Park, one of the Central Coast's other popular attractions, donated the site a group of grey kangaroos while Taronga Zoo supplied 10 seagulls in the hopes they would start a colony on the site.

The Australian Government announced it would purchase a 25.5% equity in Old Sydney Town on 22 April 1974. They joined Frank R. Fox's Developments and Bank of New South Wales (Westpac) as investors in the attraction. Frank Stewart, Minister for Tourism and Recreation, stated the venture would be "a focal point for recreation and learning about Australia's past".

=== Operation ===
The park began admitting visitors on 27 November 1974, before being officially opened on 26 January 1975, by Prime Minister Gough Whitlam. Whitlam and his wife were given a tour of the site and its re-enactments aboard a century-old barouche previously owned by the Maharaja of Mysore. Whitlam committed that the Government would invest $3.5 million into the site over the next three years. 11,000 visitors attended the event.

Daily historical re-enactments included convicts being flogged and thrown in the stocks, pistol duels and a convict rebellion. Before floggings, the soldier's whips were dipped in red dye to give the impression of drawing blood upon impact. Other recreation efforts included soldiers circulating through the town, following London Bobby principles, and several staff assumed the roles of colonial figures such as Samuel Marsden,Lt. William Dawes and Elizabeth Rafferty.

Visitors were invited to partake in feeding farm animals, bullock rides, and interactive classrooms. They could also purchase handmade goods from a tinsmith, leathermaker, potter and candlestick maker.

In November 1975, the Federal Government approved a $200,000 loan to the site to allow its operations to continue until after the December Federal Election. That increased the Government's loans to the park to $1.9 million. The Whitlam Government expressed concern for the project's management and stated it was "grossly undercapitalised". Negotiations had faltered over Whitlam's previous commitment to invest $3.5m into the site over three years.

A review of the Government's financial stake in the site by the newly elected Fraser government in March 1976, opted to ask the NSW Wran state government to take over the government's investment in the project. None of the investing parties were willing to give the park more funds and admissions were unable to generate enough income to cover the site's debts. The NSW Government took over the federal government's ownership share and was gifted Frank R Fox's Developments' 49% shareholding in the site.

==== Under NSW Government ====
During 1979–80, the NSW State Government and The Bank of NSW released Old Sydney Town from loans totalling $1.2 million. The site also received a $3.5 million secured loan that would not require interest payments until 1986. While the site was losing money, the Bank of NSW and NSW Government believed its financial position was slowly improving.

During April 1983, the NSW Government approved an emergency interim funding grant to prevent the site's closure. The park was faced with having to immediately fire 27 maintenance and repair staff to reduce operating costs. Following the completion of a management review in August, "serious management deficiencies" were found and the former general manager along with four other staff members resigned.

In 1984, the NSW Government advertised the opportunity to lease the site in hopes of developing the site's unused land into an entertainment park and tourist accommodation. During a bid to lease out the site in 1986, the NSW Government revealed the site had bled $6 million over the previous 10 years, at a rate of up to $800,000 a year.

==== Warwick Amusements Management ====
In 1987, an agreement was reached with Warwick Amusements, a subsidiary of Warwick Hotels and Resorts, for an 80-year lease. The company took over operations of Old Sydney Town and outlined a three-phase plan for the site that included a renovation of the attraction, an 18-hole golf course, a theme park, and a low-rise international hotel.

In 1994, The Eastern Seaboard Fires destroyed the site's wheel-making and carriage workshop. Mike Hendrickson, who operated the workshop, said the biggest losses were his tools and a prized horse-drawn double-decker bus he had been rebuilding. The vehicle had been the last of its kind. The site remained closed for a week after the fires.

In 1995, the Australian Reptile Park negotiated an 80-year lease for land that Old Sydney Town had reserved for a future golf course. The Reptile Park had outgrown its old property in Wyoming and was looking for a fresh start. The park officially opened on the new site in September 1996.

In 1998, NSW's Work Safety Authority fined the site $35,000 after three workers suffered burns and lacerations in a cannon firing accident. No written safety instructions had been given to the actors and they had only been allowed two days to learn the firing procedure.

Warwick Amusements purchased the site for $2.6 million from the NSW Government in 2000. State MP Arthur Chesterfield-Evans opposed the privatisation and accused Warwick Amusements of running down the site to reduce the sales price. Chesterfield-Evans said "The Government shouldn't have a problem with managing a theme park on Australian history. The National Trust could have done it." Visitors were concerned the park's boats were sinking and thought the buildings were in desperate need of repair. Warwick Amusements general manager, Paul Kiley, defended the site saying "It's meant to be buildings and constructions from the 1788-1810 period, so it's not Disneyland."

Robert Hughes featured Old Sydney Town in his documentary Australia: Beyond the Fatal Shore (2000). The segment gave an insight into the performers at the site and what drew them to the experience. Hughes called the site "the only theme park in the world devoted to punishment and repression."

The park permanently closed on 3 January 2003. Warwick Amusements had allegedly lost $1.4 million on the attraction since the land had been purchased outright in 2000. Warwick Amusements partly blamed the park's closure on a lack of youth engagement with the site due to temptations of new technologies. Employees complained about minimal maintenance and lack of marketing. Former MP Barry Cohen, called for an inquiry into the conditions of lease and sale of the site, because Warwick Amusements had never implemented its three-phase development plan.

=== Dormancy ===
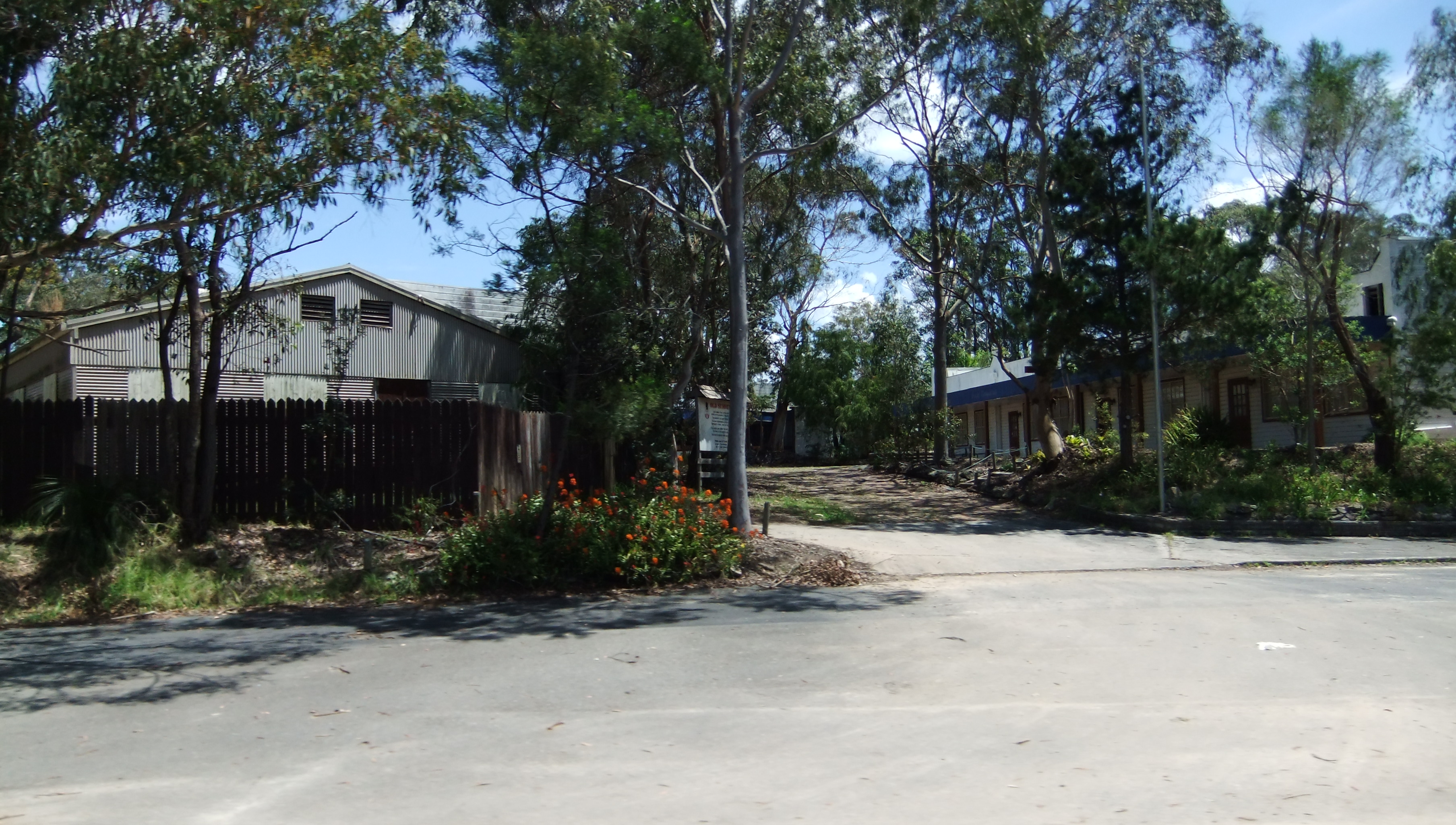
Old Sydney Town in 2010

In February 2012 residents of the Central Coast formed a committee to re-open the park.

In February 2013 the Daily Telegraph reported that the family of Frank Fox (Michael and Peter Fox) were in negotiations with the current leaseholders about reviving the town.

In the early hours of 20 February 2014, fire claimed the site's entrance and reception complex, Heritage Hall. A significant collection of artefacts and documentation stored therein were lost.

The park was sold in May 2018 to World Cultural Tourism Village. Proposed plans for the site include tourism, residential and environmental conservation areas alongside a smaller refurbished old Sydney Town.

The site was listed by the National Trust of Australia in 2019.

== Park layout and attractions ==
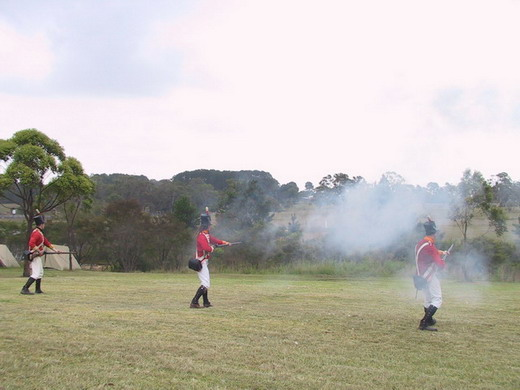
The Red Coats in action

=== Activities and Re-enactments ===
Soldiers on parade	Thundering Cannons
Pistol and sabre duels	Convict rebellion
Public Floggings	Magistrate's court
Convict punishment	Bullock rides, horse-drawn wagons
Craft stores	Kiosk, tea shop, barbecue facilities
Storming of the brig Perseverance	Timber Task Works
Animal feeding	Bush dances
Noonday Fair	Convict Weddings
Minstrel Shows	An Interactive Classroom

=== Sites and Buildings ===
The site featured a range of historical buildings, that included but was not limited to:

"Sydney Cove" - a recreation of Sydney Harbour	Bonded Store	Military Windmill	Barracks
Parade Ground	Church and Graveyard	Dawes Observatory	Gaol
Tea Shoppe	Bullock Pen	Potter's Hut and Kiln	King's Head Tavern
Magistrates Court	Mrs Rafferty's (Cottage Store)	Candlemaker	Wood Turner
Coach and Harness Museum	Seamstress	Tinsmith	BBQ Area
The Brig Perseverance	Dockyards	Blacksmith	Rosetta Stabler's Eating House
Mary Bryant's	Tank Stream	Kenny's School	Bennelong's Hut
Wool Shed			

== Filming location ==
Throughout its life and since closing, the park has been hired for film and television productions.

The ABC also used the site to record documentary resources for schools.

=== Filmography ===
Title	Year
Polly Me Love	1976
The Little Convict	1979
Against the Wind	1978
Mighty Morphin Power Rangers for the three-part episode "Return Of The Green Ranger" as colonial Angel Grove.	1995
Indian	1996
The Wiggles: Cold Spaghetti Western	2004
The Catalpa Rescue	2007
The Last Confession of Alexander Pearce	2008
The Outlaw Michael Howe	2013
Beast No More	2018
