= Nigel Sharp =

Australian conservationist

Nigel Wimble Sharp
- Born: July 28, 1961 (age 65); Hamilton, Victoria, Australia
- Occupations: Investment manager and environmentalist
- Spouse: Rosemary Etherton
- Website: www.linkedin.com/in/nigel-sharp-tiverton/

Nigel Sharp is an Australian investment manager, business executive and environmentalist known for his work in Australia for new business models of regenerative agriculture, nature positive urbanism and threatened species conservation.

He holds leadership positions across several businesses and NGOs, including CircleAG, Dragonfly Enviro Capital, Odonata Foundation, the Soil Carbon Industry Group, and the Bionutrient Food Association.

== Early years ==
Nigel Sharp was born on July 28, 1961, in Hamilton, Victoria, Australia. Growing up on his family’s farm in Branxholme, Victoria, he later credited much of his interest and passion for conservation through helping his father plant and protect creek lines on their farm and in surrounding areas, to combat rising soil salinity levels, which was a major issue at the time.

== Career ==
Sharp began his career as a qualified property valuer, and gained experience running a listed company trust. He worked in senior positions across the property funds management and property development industries, including both rural and urban property projects.

He started his involvement in conservation in 2000 when he helped rescue the predator-free ecosystem at Mount Rothwell Sanctuary Little River, Victoria and introduced a breeding program for species such as the Eastern Quoll, Eastern barred bandicoot and Southern Brush-tailed Rock-wallaby.

In 2010, he and business partner Harry Youngman purchased Tiverton Farm, a 1,000-hectare (2,500-acre) working sheep property in Western Victoria, for the purpose of eradicating non-native species and reintroducing Eastern Barred Bandicoot and Eastern Quoll, while maintaining a viable agricultural business.

In 2016 Sharp founded the Odonata Foundation, specialising in the business of biodiversity. Odonata designs and manages financially sustainable conservation projects, educating the public and empowering businesses to embrace biodiversity.

In 2017, the knowledge gained from projects at Mt Rothwell and Tiverton Farm enabled Nigel Sharp, Harry Youngman and Matt Davis to establish Tiverton Global (previously Tiverton-Rothwell) and Tiverton Global Funds Management (previously Tiverton Agricultural Impact Fund).

== Tiverton Global ==
Tiverton Global's purpose is to transform degraded agricultural landscapes at scale, into profitable, sustainable and biodiverse farms, by building healthy soils, enhancing productivity and food quality, and leaving space for nature repair. Tiverton Global’s investment philosophy recognises that healthy ecosystems – including soil, water, and biodiversity – are essential economic assets.

Tiverton Global owns or has significant investments in companies including biodiverse carbon project originator Carbon Neutral, liquid biofertiliser company CircleAG, and soil carbon measurement business Downforce Technologies. As a result, Tiverton Global does not just manage a portfolio of farms – it is a vertically integrated management system that owns the supply chain supporting its pioneering work. This is referred to as the Tiverton Global AgriSystem.

== Nutritional Agriculture ==
At the heart of Sharp's work is 'restoring health' to landscapes, profits and people. He has coined this 'Nutritional Agriculture', which encapsulates a holistic approach to land management that aims to:

1. Rebuild Soil Health: Enhancing carbon sequestration and water retention.
2. Restore Landscapes: Reintroducing native biodiversity into productive agricultural zones.
3. Ensure No Net Loss in Food Production: Increasing productivity and securing food systems at the same time as building back natural systems.
4. Improving the nutritional quality of food grown, with flow-on benefits to human health.

Sharp’s work seeks to demonstrate that our climate, biodiversity, human health and productivity crises are deeply connected – but the solutions are equally connected. Rather than forcing a trade-off between profitability and nature, biodiversity restoration can be a driver of long-term financial returns.

== Key conservation projects ==
2022 – Successfully returned a breeding population of Eastern Quolls into Tiverton Farm, returning the species to a region it had been extinct for 70 years.

2021 – Helped establish the Byron Bay mobile wildlife hospital, based in Knockrow, NSW.

2021 – Originated the concept of “regenerative urbanism” at the Glen Junor development outside Melbourne, creating a high value corridor connecting Brisbane Ranges National Park and the Werribee Gorge State Park.

2020 – Founded the South-East Australia Sanctuary Operations Network (now the National Sanctuary Network), bringing diversity and connectivity to threatened species conservation.

2020 – Secured the down-listing from extinct to critically endangered of the Eastern Barred Bandicoot.

2019 – Marshalled the emergency bushfire evacuation and translocation of Southern Brush-tailed Rock-wallabies from Canberra, saving them from local extinction.

2019 – Co-designed Melbourne SkyFarm Environmental Education Centre.

2017 – Integrated threatened species programs into three regenerative agriculture enterprises: Orana Park farm, Picardy Station and Sunland Fresh Fruit.

== Awards and honours ==
The Australian Impact Investment Awards (2020) - Outstanding Individual Achievement

Zoos Victoria - Lifetime Achievement Award (2019)
