= Nocturnal house =

Zoo building where nocturnal animals are kept

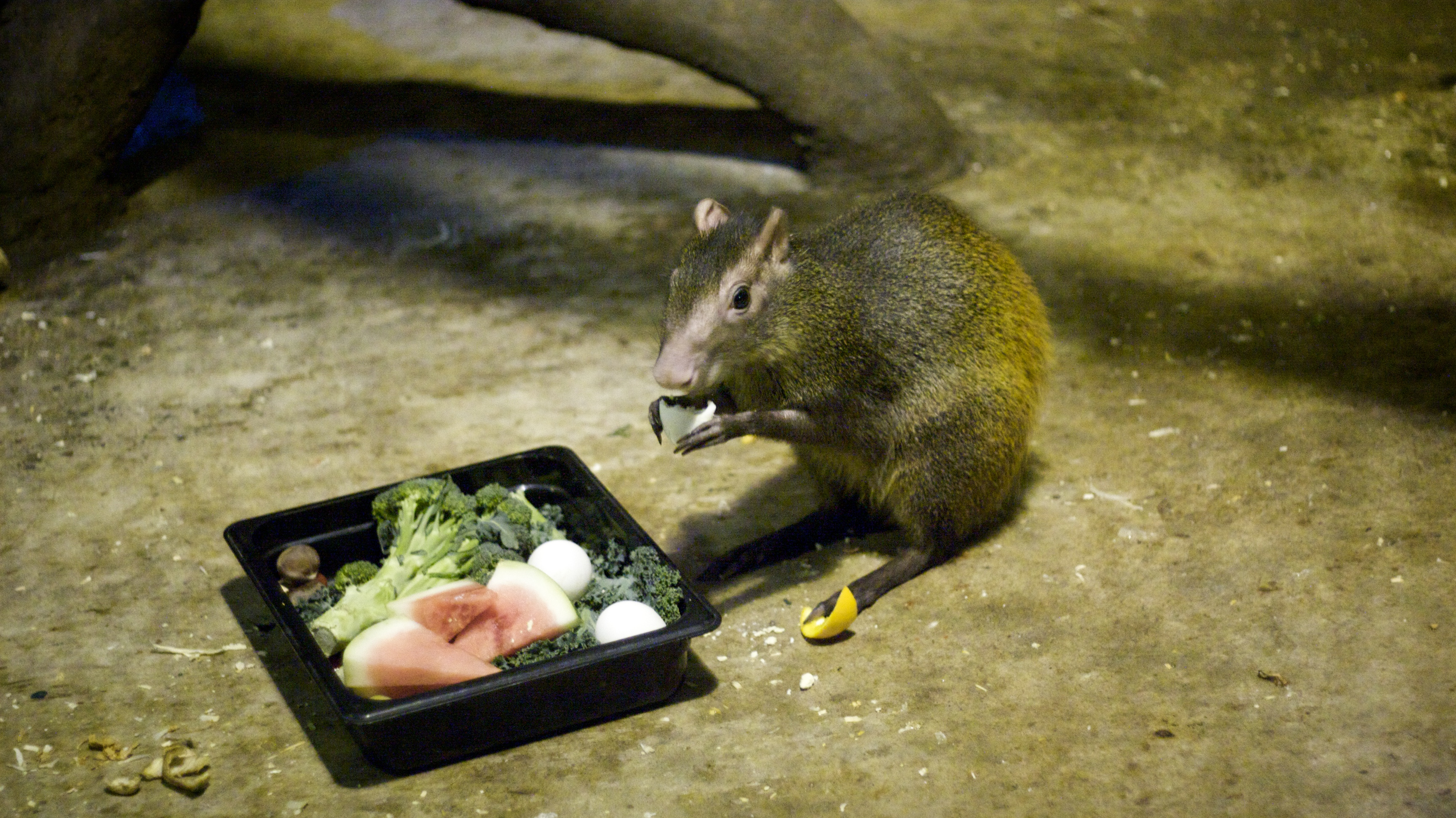
Animal in the nocturnal house at the Calgary Zoo.

A nocturnal house, sometimes called a nocturama, is a building in a zoo or research establishment where nocturnal animals are kept and viewable by the public. The unique feature of buildings of this type is that the lighting within is isolated from the outside and reversed; i.e. it is dark during the day and lit at night. This is to enable visitors and researchers to more conveniently study nocturnal animals during daylight hours.

Internally, a building usually consists of several glass-walled enclosures containing a replica of the animals' normal environments. In the case of burrowing animals, often their tunnels are 'half-glassed' so the animals can be observed while underground.

== Notable nocturnal houses ==
=== Current ===
==== USA ====
- Kingdoms of The Night, Omaha's Henry Doorly Zoo & Aquarium (Nebraska)
- Nocturnal Building and Aviary, Columbus Zoo & Aquarium (Ohio)
- Animals of The Night, Memphis Zoo (Tennessee)
- Bat House in Jaguar Jungle, Audubon Zoo (Louisiana)
- Brazos by Night, Cameron Park Zoo (Texas)
- World of Darkness, Bronx Zoo (New York)
- Desert's Edge and Clouded leopard Rain Forest, Brookfield Zoo (Illinois)
- Night Hunters, Cincinnati Zoo and Botanical Garden (Ohio)

==== Mexico ====
- Guadalajara Zoo

==== United Kingdom ====
- Nightlife, ZSL London Zoo
- Fruit Bat Forest, Chester Zoo

==== Europe ====
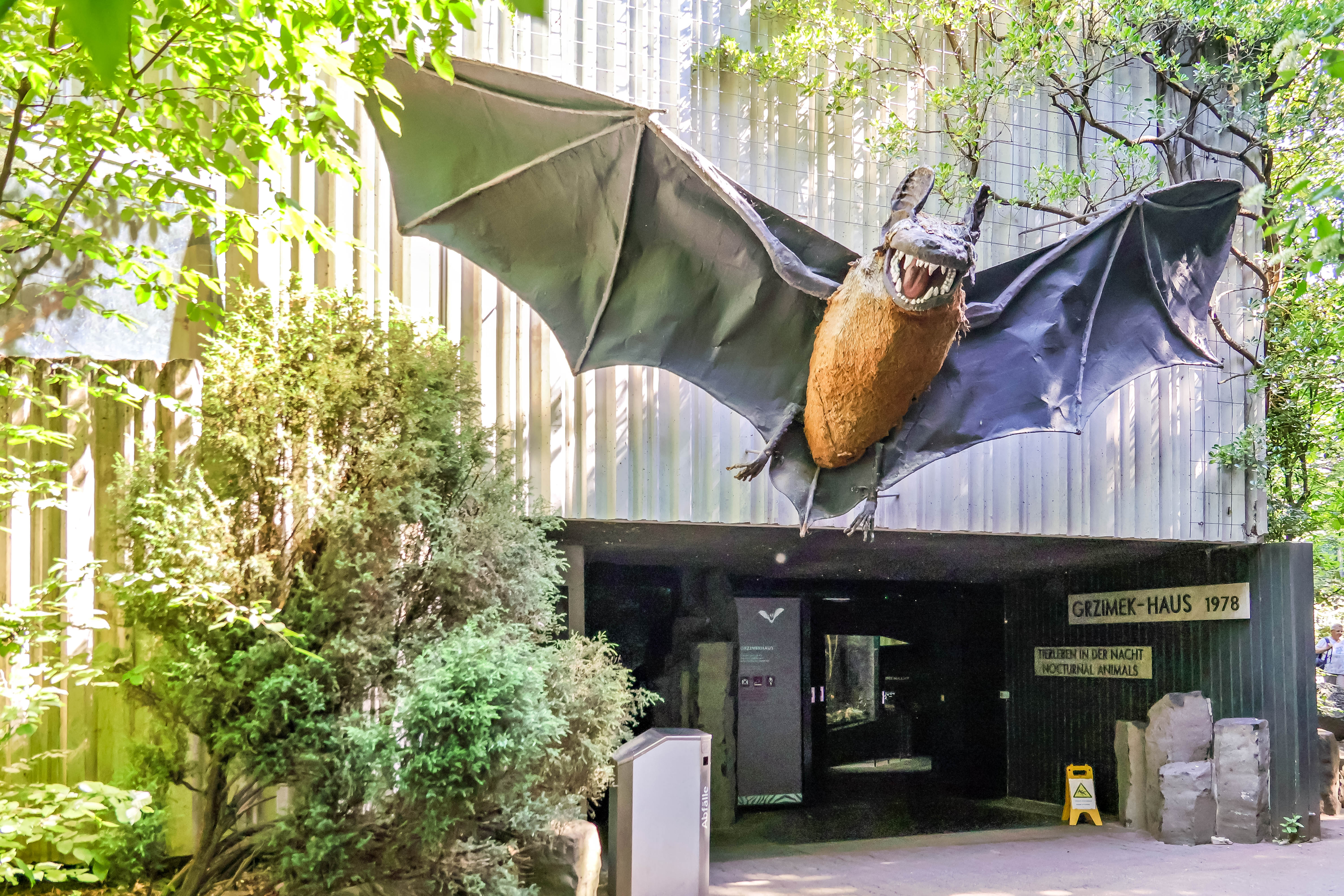
Grzimek building (nocturnal house) in Zoo Frankfurt

- Berlin Zoological Garden
- Frankfurt Zoological Garden
- Moscow Zoo
- Prague Zoo
- Plzen Zoo
- Budapest Zoological and Botanical Garden

==== Australasia ====
- Nguwing Nura, Taronga Zoo
- Wild Life Sydney
- Adelaide Zoo
- Perth Zoo
- David Fleay Wildlife Park
- Auckland Zoo

==== India ====
- Nandankanan Zoological Park

=== Former ===
==== USA ====
- The Night Exhibit, Woodland Park Zoo (Seattle, WA) - closed 2010

==== Canada ====
Creatures Of The Night Calgary Zoo[ [Calgary ]] , AB)- closed 2011 -Demolished around 2013 - 2014 ,Replaced by Savanna Plains And Savanna Crossing IN Destination Africa, In 2025
