= List of lakes of Australia =

Natural freshwater lakes in Australia are rare due to the general absence of glacial and tectonic activity in Australia.

== Types ==
Most lakes in Australia fall within one of five categories. Excluding lakes and lagoons created by artificial dams for water storage and other purposes, one can identify the following:

- coastal lakes and lagoons including perched lakes;
- natural freshwater inland lakes, often ephemeral and some part of wetland or swamp areas;
- the Main Range containing mainland Australia's five glacial lakes. In Tasmania, due to glaciation, there are a large number of natural freshwater lakes on the central plateau, many of which have been enlarged or modified by hydro-electric developments;
- predominantly dry, salt lakes in the flat desert regions of the country lacking organised drainage; and
- lakes created in volcanic remnants.

== List of lakes and lagoons by state and territory ==
=== Australian Antarctic Territory ===
The following is a list of prominent natural lakes and lagoons in the sector of Antarctica claimed by Australia as the Australian Antarctic Territory:

Order	Name	Type	Region	Designation	Area		Image	Notes
Order	Name	Type	Region	Designation	ha	acre	Image	Notes
1	Braunsteffer Lake	Glacial	Princess Elizabeth Land		0.0769	0.19		
2	Club Lake	Glacial	Princess Elizabeth Land					
3	Collerson Lake	Glacial	Princess Elizabeth Land					
4	Dingle Lake	Glacial	Princess Elizabeth Land		68	168		
5	Krok Lake	Glacial	Princess Elizabeth Land					
6	Station Tarn	Glacial	Princess Elizabeth Land					
7	Stinear Lake	Glacial	Princess Elizabeth Land					
8	Lake Vereteno	Glacial	Princess Elizabeth Land					
9	Lake Zvezda	Glacial	Princess Elizabeth Land					

=== Australian Capital Territory ===
In the Australian Capital Territory there are no prominent naturally-formed lakes and lagoons. Artificial lakes include Bendora Dam, Cotter Dam, Corin Dam, Lake Burley Griffin, Lake Ginninderra, Lake Tuggeranong, and Stranger Pond.

=== New South Wales ===
The following is a list of prominent natural lakes and lagoons in New South Wales:

Order	Name	Type	Region	Designation	Area		Image	Notes
Order	Name	Type	Region	Designation	ha	acre	Image	Notes
1	Lake Albina	Glacial	Snowy Mountains	Kosciuszko National Park; Australian Alps National Parks and Reserves	0.66	2		
2	Avoca Lake	Coastal	Central Coast		70	173		
3	Lake Bathurst	Freshwater ephemeral	Southern Tablelands		10	25		
4	Blue Lake	Freshwater ephemeral; Glacial	Snowy Mountains	Kosciuszko National Park; Australian Alps National Parks and Reserves; Ramsar site	16	40		
5	Budgewoi Lake	Coastal	Central Coast		1,400	3,459		
6	Lake Cathie	Coastal						
7	Chipping Norton Lake	Freshwater ephemeral	Greater Sydney					
8	Lake Cootapatamba	Glacial	Snowy Mountains					
9	Lake Cowal	Freshwater ephemeral	Central West					
10	Dee Why Lagoon	Coastal lagoon	Northern Beaches					
11	Lake George	Freshwater ephemeral	Southern Tablelands					
12	Glenbrook Lagoon	Freshwater ephemeral	Blue Mountains					
13	Glenrock Lagoon	Coastal lagoon						
14	Headley Tarn	Glacial						
15	Lake Illawarra	Coastal	Illawarra					
16	Lake Macquarie	Coastal	Hunter					
17	Menindee Lakes	Freshwater ephemeral	Far West					
18	Lake Moore	Freshwater ephemeral						
19	Lake Mungo	Saline	Far West					
20	Lake Munmorah	Coastal	Central Coast					
21	Myall Lakes	Coastal	Mid North Coast					
22	Narrabeen Lagoon	Coastal	Northern Beaches		220	544		
23	Narran Lakes	Freshwater ephemeral						
24	Smiths Lake	Coastal	Mid North Coast					
25	St Georges Basin	Coastal	South Coast / Jervis Bay Territory					
26	Tabourie Lake	Coastal	Mid North Coast					
27	Terrigal Lagoon	Coastal lagoon	Central Coast					
28	Tuggerah Lake	Coastal	Central Coast					
29	Lake Urana	Saline	Far West					
30	Wallaga Lake	Freshwater ephemeral						
31	Wallis Lake	Coastal	Mid North Coast					
32	Wamberal Lagoon	Coastal lagoon	Central Coast					
33	Wattle Grove Lake	Freshwater ephemeral						
34	Willandra Lakes	Saline	Far West					
35	Lake Wollumboola	Coastal	Mid North Coast					
36	Wonboyn Lake	Coastal	Mid North Coast					
37	Lake Woytchugga	Freshwater ephemeral						
38	Peery Lake	Freshwater ephemeral	Far West	Ramsar	5,026	12,420		

=== Northern Territory ===
The following is a list of prominent natural lakes and lagoons in the Northern Territory:

Order	Name	Type	Region	Designation	Area		Image	Notes
Order	Name	Type	Region	Designation	ha	acre	Image	Notes
1	Lake Amadeus	Saline	South-west		103,200	255,013		
2	Corella Lake	Freshwater ephemeral						
3	Lake Mackay	Saline	Great Sandy Desert; Gibson Desert; Tanami Desert		349,400	863,386		
4	Lake Neale	Saline	South-west		30,000	74,132		
5	Numby Numby	Sinkhole	Gulf of Carpentaria					
6	Lake Sylvester	Freshwater ephemeral	Barkly Tableland		200,000	494,211		
7	Tarrabool Lake	Freshwater ephemeral	Barkly Tableland	Tarrabool Lake – Eva Downs Swamp System; Important Bird Area; Register of the National Estate; DIWA	118,600	293,067		
8	Lake Woods	Freshwater ephemeral	Barkly Tableland	Important Bird Area; Longreach Waterhole Protected Area (part)	118,600	293,067		
9	Lake Lewis	Saline ephemeral						

=== Queensland ===
The following is a list of prominent natural lakes and lagoons in Queensland:

Order	Name	Type	Region	Designation	Area		Image	Notes
Order	Name	Type	Region	Designation	ha	acre	Image	Notes
1	Lake Awoonga	Freshwater ephemeral	Central		6,750	16,700		
2	Lake Barrine	Volcanic	Far North	Atherton Tableland				
3	Blue Lake	Coastal	South East	North Stradbroke Island	500	1,236		
4	Boobera Lagoon	Freshwater ephemeral	South West					
5	Lake Boomanjin	Perched	K'gari	Great Sandy National Park	200	494		
6	Brown Lake	Coastal	South East	North Stradbroke Island				
7	Lake Broadwater	Coastal	South East					
8	Lake Buchanan	Saline	North	Desert Uplands	11,700	28,911		
9	Lake Como	Coastal	South East					
10	Lake Cooloola	Coastal	Wide-Bay					
11	Lake Cooroibah	Coastal	South East					
12	Lake Cootharaba	Coastal	Wide-Bay	Great Sandy National Park				
13	Lake Dunn	Freshwater ephemeral	Central West					
14	Lake Eacham	Volcanic	Far North	Atherton Tableland	42.9	106		
15	Lake Elphinstone	Freshwater ephemeral	Central					
16	Lake Euramoo	Volcanic	Far North	Tablelands Region	4.4	11		
17	Lake Galilee	Saline	Central West		25,700	64,000		
18	Lake McKenzie	Perched	K'gari	Great Sandy National Park	150	370		
19	Lake Nuga Nuga	Freshwater ephemeral	Central Highlands	Nuga Nuga National Park				
20	Lake Weyba	Coastal	South East		960	2.372		
21	Lake Wabby	Perched	K'gari	Great Sandy National Park				
22	Lake Yamma Yamma	Saline	South East	Channel Country				

=== South Australia ===
The following is a list of prominent natural lakes and lagoons in South Australia:

Order	Name	Type	Region	Designation	Area		Image	Notes
Order	Name	Type	Region	Designation	ha	acre	Image	Notes
1	Lake Albert	Freshwater	Murray Mallee	Coorong and Lakes Alexandrina and Albert Wetland Ramsar site; Lakes Alexandrina and Albert Important Bird Area				
2	Lake Alexandrina	Freshwater	Murray Mallee	Coorong and Lakes Alexandrina and Albert Wetland Ramsar site; Lakes Alexandrina and Albert Important Bird Area	64,900	160,371		
3	Lake Blanche	Saline	Far North	Strzelecki Desert Lakes Important Bird Area				
4	Blue Lake	Volcanic	Limestone Coast		70	173		
5	Lake Bonney SE	Coastal	Limestone Coast	Canunda National Park	5,056	12,494		
6	Lake Bonney Riverland	Freshwater	Riverland					
7	Lake Bumbunga	Saline	Mid North		1,388	3,430		
8	Lake Cadibarrawirracanna	Saline	Mid North	Woomera Prohibited Area	6,000	14,826		
9	Lake Callabonna	Saline	Far North	Strzelecki Desert Lakes Important Bird Area	16,000	39,537		
10	Coongie Lakes	Wetlands	Far North	Ramsar Site; Innamincka Regional Reserve; Malkumba-Coongie Lakes National Park; Strzelecki Regional Reserve	2,179,000	5,384,426		
11	Lake Dey Dey	Saline	Far North					
12	Lake Dutton	Saline	Far North					
13	Kati Thanda–Lake Eyre	Saline endorheic	Far North	Kati Thanda-Lake Eyre National Park; Elliot Price Conservation Park	950,000	2,347,501		
14	Lake Frome	Saline endorheic	Flinders Ranges	Lake Frome Regional Reserve	259,615	641,523		
15	Lake Gairdner	Saline endorheic	Eyre Peninsula	Lake Gairdner National Park				
16	Lake Gilles	Saline	Eyre Peninsula	Lake Gilles Conservation Park				
17	Goyder Lagoon	Ephemeral swamp	Far North					
18	Lake Gregory	Saline	Far North					
19	Lake Hart	Saline						
20	Lake Hope	Saline ephemeral	Far North	Coongie Lakes wetland Ramsar Site	3,600	8,896		
21	Lake Miranda	Freshwater ephemeral						
22	Seagull Lake	Saline ephemeral	Eyre Peninsula	Sceale Bay Conservation Park	88	217		
23	Serpentine Lakes	Saline	Great Victoria Desert	Mamungari Conservation Park	9,700	23,969		
24	Sleaford Mere	Saline endorheic	Eyre Peninsula	Sleaford Mere Conservation Park	707	1,747		
25	Lake Torrens	Saline ephemeral	Flinders Ranges	Lake Torrens National Park	574,500	1,419,620		
26	Valley Lake	Volcanic	Limestone Coast					
27	Watervalley Wetlands	Contiguous wetlands	Murray Mallee		13,100	32,371		

=== Tasmania ===
The following is a list of prominent natural lakes and lagoons in Tasmania:

Order	Name	Type	Region	Designation	Area		Image	Notes
Order	Name	Type	Region	Designation	ha	acre	Image	Notes
1	Lake Beatrice	Freshwater	Western		55	136		
2	Lake Dora	Freshwater	Western		48	119		
3	Dove Lake	Cirque freshwater	Central Highlands	Cradle Mountain-Lake St Clair National Park	86	213		
4	Lake Dulverton	Freshwater ephemeral	Southern Midlands		230	568		
5	Lake Edgar	Fault scarp pond	South West	Tasmanian Wilderness World Heritage Area	147	363		
6	Lake Fidler	Meromictic	South West	Tasmanian Wilderness World Heritage Area				
7	Lake Flannigan	Freshwater	King Island	Game reserve (pending as at 2005)	150	371		
8	Great Lake	Freshwater	Central Highlands		17,600	43,491		
9	Jocks Lagoon	Dystrophic lake	Central Northern	Ramsar site	18	44		
10	Little Waterhouse Lake	Freshwater coastal	North East	Ramsar Site	10	25		
11	Lake Meston	Freshwater	Central Northern	Walls of Jerusalem National Park				
12	Orielton Lagoon	Dystrophic coastal lagoon	South East Coast	Ramsar Site	3,334	8,240		
13	Lake Selina	Glacial	West Coast					
14	Lake St Clair	Freshwater	Central Highlands	Cradle Mountain-Lake St Clair National Park	4,500	11,120		
15	Lake Westwood	Glacial	West Coast		35	86		

=== Victoria ===
The following is a list of prominent natural lakes and lagoons in Victoria.

Order	Name	Type	Region	Designation	Area		Image	Notes
Order	Name	Type	Region	Designation	ha	acre	Image	Notes
1	Lake Batyo Catyo	Freshwater ephemeral			230	568		
2	Lake Corangamite	Saline			23000	56834		
3	Gippsland Lakes	Coastal						
4	Lake Hindmarsh	Freshwater ephemeral	Wimmera		13500	33000		
5	Mallacoota Inlet	Coastal						
6	Murtnaghurt Lagoon	Saline			81	200		
7	Lake Victoria	Coastal lake			139	340		
8	Lake Tali Karng	Freshwater	Alpine		14	35		
9	Pink Lake (Victoria)	Saline	Wimmera		45	111		

=== Western Australia ===
The following is a list of prominent natural lakes and lagoons in Western Australia:

Order	Name	Type	Region	Designation	Area		Image	Notes
Order	Name	Type	Region	Designation	ha	acre	Image	Notes
1	Angove Lake	Freshwater	Great Southern	Two Peoples Bay Nature Reserve	33	82		
2	Lake Anneen	Saline	Mid West		12,000	29,653		
3	Lake Baghdad	Saline	Rottnest Island					
4	Lake Ballard	Saline ephemeral	Goldfields–Esperance		4,900	12,108		
5	Lake Barlee	Saline	Mid West		198,000	489,269		
6	Bibra Lake	Freshwater	Perth	Beeliar Regional Park				
7	Lake Boonderoo	Freshwater	Goldfields-Esperance		2,500	6,178		
8	Booragoon Lake	Freshwater	Perth	Beeliar Regional Park				
9	Boyd Lagoon	Saline lagoon	Gibson Desert		870	2,150		
10	Lake Breaden	Saline	Gibson Desert		2,600	6,425		
11	Lake Bryde-East Lake Bryde	Freshwater wetland	Great Southern	Lake Bryde Nature Reserve	1,900	4,695		
12	Lake Burnside	Saline	Gibson Desert		42,000	103,784		
13	Lake Carey	Saline	Goldfields-Esperance					
14	Lake Carnegie	Ephemeral	Goldfields-Esperance		571,400	1,411,960		
16	Lake Dora	Saline	Pilbara					
17	Dumbleyung Lake	Saline	Great Southern	Dumbleyung Lake Nature Reserve	5,200	12,849		
18	Lake Dundas	Saline	Goldfields-Esperance					
19	Forrestdale Lake	Brackish seasonal groundwater	Perth	Forrestdale Lake Nature Reserve; Forrestdale and Thomsons Lakes Ramsar Site	245	605		
20	Lake Gore	Seasonal freshwater	Goldfields-Esperance	Lake Gore Nature Reserve; Lake Gore Ramsar Site	740	1,829		
21	Lake Gregory	Seasonal freshwater	Kimberley	Paraku Indigenous Protected Area				
22	Herdsman Lake	Freshwater	Perth	Herdsman Lake Regional Park	300	741		
23	Lake Hillier	Saline	Goldfields-Esperance	Recherche Archipelago Nature Reserve	1.5	4		
24	Hutt Lagoon	Saline	Mid West					
25	Lake Jasper	Freshwater	South West		4,500	11,120		
26	Lake Joondalup	Freshwater	Perth	Yellagonga Regional Park				
27	Jualbup Lake	Freshwater	Perth	Shenton Park				
15	Kumpupintil Lake	Saline endorheic	Pilbara		33,000	81,545		
28	Lake Lefroy	Saline ephemeral	Goldfields-Esperance					
29	Lake Mackay	Saline	Great Sandy Desert		349,400	863,386		
30	Lake McLarty	Freshwater	South West	Lake McLarty Nature Reserve; Peel-Yalgorup System Ramsar site				
31	Lake Macleod	Freshwater	Gascoyne		150,000	370,658		
32	Loch McNess	Freshwater	Perth	Yanchep National Park				
33	Lake Magenta	Saline ephemeral	Wheatbelt	Lake Magenta Nature Reserve	11,000	27,182		
34	Lake Maitland	Dry saline	Mid West					
35	Lake Monger	Freshwater	Perth	Lake Monger Reserve	70	173		
36	Lake Monginup	Freshwater	Goldfields-Esperance	Lake Monginup Nature Reserve	32	79		
37	Lake Muir	Freshwater	South West	Muir-Byenup System Ramsar Site	4	10		
38	Lake Nabberu	Saline	Mid West		18,000	44,479		
39	Lake Newell		Goldfields-Esperance		2,600	6,425		
40	North Lake	Freshwater	Perth	Beeliar Regional Park				
41	Perry Lakes	Freshwater	Perth	Perry Lakes Reserve	12.6	31		
42	Perth Wetlands	Wetlands	Perth	Herdsman Lake Regional Park				
43	Pink Lake	Saline	Goldfields-Esperance		99	245		
44	Lake Seppings	Freshwater	South West	Lake Seppings Nature Reserve				
45	Serpentine Lakes	Saline	Great Victoria Desert	Mamungari Conservation Park	9,700	23,969		
46	Lake Shaster	Hypersaline	Goldfields-Esperance	Lake Shaster Nature Reserve	479	1,184		
47	Lake Thetis	Saline	Mid West					
48	Thomsons Lake	Brackish seasonal groundwater	Perth	Thomsons Lake Nature Reserve; Forrestdale and Thomsons Lakes Ramsar Site	538	1,329		
49	Toolibin Lake	Perched freshwater	Wheatbelt	Toolibin Lake Nature Reserve; Toolibin Lake Ramsar Site	300	741		
50	Lake Warden	Saline	Goldfields-Esperance	Lake Warden Nature Reserve	59	146		
51	Lake Way	Dry saline	Mid-West		46,000	113,668		
52	Lake Wooleen	Intermittent freshwater	Mid-West		5,500	13,591		

== See also ==
- List of dams and reservoirs in Australia
- List of lagoons of Australia
