= List of lakes of Western Australia, Q–Z =

This list includes all lakes, both intermittent and perennial. It is complete with respect to the 1996 Gazetteer of Australia. Dubious names have been checked against the online 2004 data, and in all cases confirmed correct. However, if any lakes have been gazetted or deleted since 1996, this list does not reflect these changes. Strictly speaking, Australian place names are gazetted in capital letters only; the names in this list have been converted to mixed case in accordance with normal capitalisation conventions. Locations are as gazetted; some lakes may extend over large areas.

== Q ==
Name	Coordinates	Remarks
Qualeup Lake	33°51′S 116°46′E	
Quallilup Lake	33°49′S 121°31′E	
Quanbun Billabong	18°23′S 125°14′E	
Lake Quarbing	33°24′S 117°19′E	
Quarderwardup Lake	34°28′S 118°20′E	
Queerearrup Lake	33°31′S 117°14′E	
Quindalup Lake	33°38′S 115°7′E	
Lake Quitjup	34°23′S 115°36′E	

== R ==
Name	Coordinates	Remarks
Racecourse Lake	34°12′S 117°40′E	
Lake Raeside	29°29′S 122°1′E	
Lake Rafa	33°27′S 119°22′E	
Lake Rason	28°41′S 124°19′E	
Lake Rebecca	30°8′S 122°33′E	
Red Billabong	18°32′S 125°8′E	
Red Lake	20°12′S 126°31′E	
Red Lake	32°35′S 120°25′E	
Red Lake	31°5′S 118°26′E	
Red Lake	33°7′S 121°42′E	
Red Lake	32°12′S 118°5′E	
Red Lake	30°55′S 121°36′E	
Red Lake	34°26′S 116°40′E	
Red Lake	33°3′S 115°48′E	
Reward Lake	31°6′S 118°27′E	
Lake Richmond	32°17′S 115°43′E	
Lake Rivers	31°11′S 123°1′E	
Lake Roe	30°41′S 122°35′E	
Lake Romani	33°28′S 119°24′E	
Lake Ronnel	19°30′S 125°59′E	
Lake Ronnerup	33°15′S 119°37′E	
Rowles Lake	31°15′S 116°42′E	
Lake Royston	33°27′S 119°15′E	
Lake Rupert	30°46′S 116°36′E	
Rushy Lake	33°45′S 117°9′E	

== S ==
Name	Coordinates	Remarks
Sachses Lakes	31°16′S 117°55′E	
Lake Saide	35°2′S 117°28′E	
Salt Lake	33°22′S 117°23′E	
Sames Lake	31°11′S 116°55′E	
Lake Samuel	34°44′S 116°3′E	
Sandy Billabong	18°27′S 124°48′E	
Lake Sandy	32°14′S 115°51′E	
Schmidt Pools	28°36′S 120°54′E	
Lake Seabrook	30°56′S 119°39′E	
Second Yarp	16°53′S 122°59′E	
Lake Seppings	35°1′S 117°55′E	
Serpentine Lake	32°0′S 115°31′E	
Shark Lake	33°46′S 121°51′E	
Lake Sharpe	32°55′S 120°58′E	
Lake Shaster	33°53′S 120°42′E	
Lake Sirius	32°0′S 115°31′E	
Lake Skeleton	17°53′S 123°41′E	
Small Lake	33°32′S 117°12′E	
Lake Small	26°32′S 125°38′E	
Lake Smith	34°26′S 115°43′E	
Smythe Lake	31°56′S 115°56′E	
Spade Lake	31°12′S 115°38′E	
Lake Sprenger	25°29′S 125°28′E	
Station Lake	33°48′S 121°57′E	
Stennetts Lake	33°12′S 119°59′E	
Stevens Lakes	33°50′S 122°2′E	
Lake Stubbs	33°4′S 119°1′E	
Sugarbag Hole Billabong	18°30′S 125°32′E	
Lake Sunshine	24°39′S 120°34′E	
Lake Surprise	34°42′S 116°54′E	
Swan Lake	34°44′S 118°27′E	
Swan Lake	31°6′S 122°19′E	
Swan Lake	30°41′S 122°41′E	
Swan Lakes	34°19′S 115°11′E	

== T ==
Name	Coordinates	Remarks
Taarblin Lake	32°57′S 117°33′E	
Tadpole Lake	32°43′S 120°19′E	
Lake Talbot	25°5′S 121°21′E	
Talyelwelup Lake	34°10′S 116°51′E	
Tamaton Lake	31°11′S 116°54′E	
Tarblong Lake	33°50′S 122°27′E	
Lake Tay	32°55′S 120°48′E	
Taylor Lake	33°35′S 115°31′E	
Tea Lake	33°58′S 115°1′E	
Lake Teague	25°44′S 120°54′E	
Terminal Lake	24°28′S 120°37′E	
Lake Thetis	30°30′S 115°5′E	
Thomsons Lake	32°9′S 115°50′E	
Three Star Lake	33°1′S 120°35′E	
Lake Throssell	27°37′S 124°7′E	
Tiger Snake Lake	33°36′S 115°30′E	
Lake Tilly	26°40′S 115°43′E	
Lake Timperley	32°0′S 115°31′E	
Tobin Lake	21°40′S 125°35′E	
Tom South Lake	34°15′S 117°38′E	
Tomato Lake	31°59′S 115°56′E	
Toolbrunup Lake	34°7′S 117°50′E	
Toolibin Lake	32°55′S 117°36′E	
Lake Torrup	34°23′S 119°12′E	
Towerrining Lake	33°35′S 116°47′E	
Lake Tunney	33°1′S 118°55′E	

== U ==
Name	Coordinates	Remarks
Ungani Lakes	17°57′S 122°46′E	
Unicup Lake	34°21′S 116°44′E	
Uramurdah Lake	26°40′S 120°30′E	

== V ==
Name	Coordinates	Remarks
Lake Varley	32°41′S 119°22′E	
Lake Vincent	32°0′S 115°31′E	
Lake Violet	26°39′S 120°14′E	

== W ==
Name	Coordinates	Remarks
Wagin Lake	33°20′S 117°21′E	
Waigen Lakes	27°36′S 128°49′E	
Waikelongup Flat	34°8′S 117°59′E	
Walbyring Lake	32°56′S 117°35′E	
Wallambin Lake	30°59′S 117°33′E	
Lake Walton	30°55′S 120°2′E	
Walyormouring Lake	31°9′S 116°52′E	
Lake Walyungup	32°20′S 115°47′E	
Waneragup Lake	33°28′S 115°41′E	
Lake Wannamal	31°7′S 116°3′E	
Wanneary Lake	30°36′S 116°37′E	
Warburton Lake	34°43′S 118°13′E	
Lake Ward	26°19′S 120°42′E	
Lake Warden	33°49′S 121°52′E	
Wardering Lake	33°32′S 117°15′E	
Wareenip Lakes	34°14′S 117°34′E	
Warramboo Lake	28°27′S 115°42′E	
Lake Waukarlycarly	21°18′S 121°56′E	
Lake Way	26°47′S 120°20′E	
Weelawadgi Lake	29°50′S 115°8′E	
Weelhamby Lake	29°13′S 116°27′E	
Wheatfield Lake	33°49′S 121°55′E	
White Lake	24°42′S 121°43′E	
White Lake	29°55′S 115°7′E	
White Lake	31°14′S 115°48′E	
White Lake	33°0′S 117°28′E	
White Lake	34°46′S 118°9′E	
White Lake	33°44′S 121°50′E	
White Water Lake	32°32′S 117°38′E	
Lake White	21°10′S 128°54′E	
Lake Wilderness	24°18′S 121°8′E	
Lake William	35°5′S 117°36′E	
Lake Williamup	33°46′S 121°37′E	
Lake Wills	21°23′S 128°37′E	
Lake Willson	19°23′S 128°17′E	
Lake Wilson	34°26′S 115°43′E	
Windabout Lakes	33°49′S 121°54′E	
Lake Winifred	22°43′S 123°30′E	
Wirra Wirra Lake	27°47′S 118°29′E	
Lake Wonjan	30°1′S 115°53′E	
Woodada Lake	29°45′S 115°6′E	
Woody Lake	33°49′S 121°55′E	
Lake Wooleen	27°4′S 116°11′E	
Wright Lake	32°6′S 116°0′E	

== Y ==
Name	Coordinates	Remarks
Lake Yakine	31°48′S 116°0′E	
Yalbanberup Pool	32°29′S 115°47′E	
Lake Yalgorup	32°52′S 115°41′E	
Yallurnie Lake	30°51′S 121°56′E	
Yangebup Lake	32°7′S 115°50′E	
Yanget Lake	29°54′S 115°8′E	
Yangy Lake	30°49′S 115°45′E	
Yanneri Lake	24°27′S 120°29′E	
Yeagarup Lake	34°33′S 115°52′E	
Lake Yealering	32°36′S 117°38′E	
Lake Yeerealup	31°18′S 115°50′E	
Yellanup Lake	34°43′S 117°55′E	
Yenyening Lakes	32°14′S 117°12′E	
Lake Yenyening	32°4′S 117°24′E	
Yeo Lake	27°59′S 124°22′E	
Lake Yindana	30°43′S 122°49′E	
Lake Yindarlgooda	30°37′S 122°6′E	
Yonderup Lake	31°33′S 115°41′E	
Yoorawai Billabong	14°42′S 126°31′E	
Youngs Lake	35°1′S 117°28′E	
Yourdamung Lake	33°12′S 116°16′E	

== See also ==
- List of lakes in Western Australia
