= Carle Thulka =

Salt lake in South Australia

- Lake Maurice
- Carle Thulka in South Australia

- Location within South Australia
- Location: South Australia
- Coordinates: 29°25′S 130°59′E
- Type: salt lake
- Basin countries: Australia
- Surface area: 29 km^{2} (11 sq mi)
- Surface elevation: 193 m (633 ft)

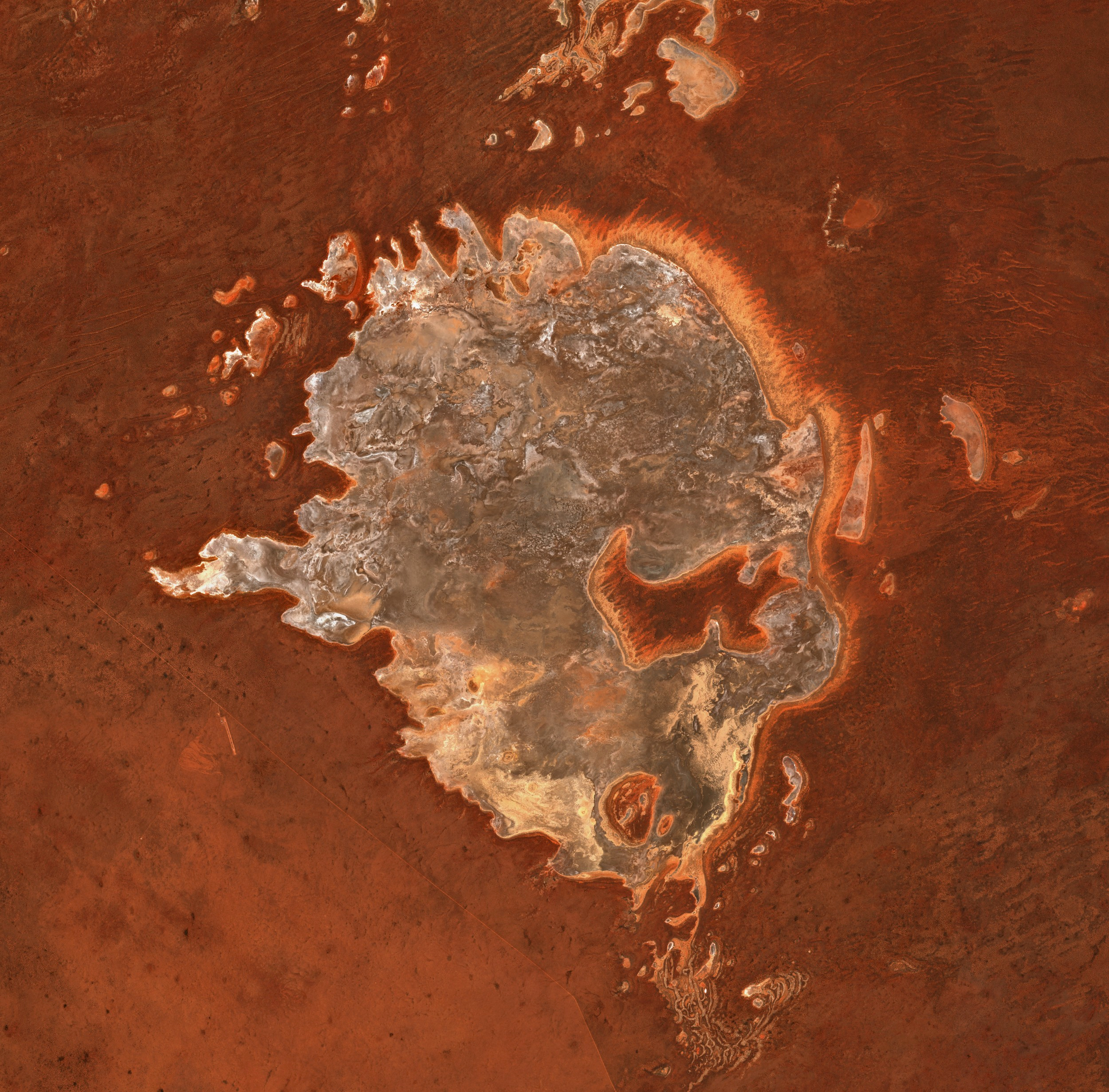
Carle Thulka from space

Carle Thulka, officially Carle Thulka / Lake Maurice is a salt lake in South Australia. It is the largest of many salt lakes in the eastern end of the Great Victoria Desert. It is normally dry, except during and after periods of heavy rainfall. When it is full, the lake covers an area of around 2,900 hectares (29 km^{2}). It is part of the geological basin known as the Officer Basin. The smaller Lake Dey Dey is to the north. Since 1985, Carle Thulka is part of the lands belonging to the Maralinga Tjarutja, a southern branch of the Pitjantjatjara. The community of Oak Valley is near the western shore of the lake.

The exposed surface of the lake normally consists of dry clay, silt or sand, covered with a salty crust. The area around Carle Thulka is very dry. Two wells have been drilled to the southeast and northwest of Carle Thulka, to search for uranium and other minerals. Both wells yield very low levels of groundwater. The water contains high levels of salt. It has also been found to contain radium and sediments from the Cambrian period. The elevation of the surface above mean sea level is 193 m (633 ft).

== History ==
Europeans named the lake after the explorer Richard Maurice. Maurice went on at least eight expeditions to the Great Victoria Desert between 1897 and 1903. He was not the first European to pass through this region: Ernest Giles and his team had explored the area almost 20 years before. Giles saw the lake in 1875, but he did not give it a name. He described the area as barren, and wrote that he and his team found no game between Lake Maurice and the Western Australian border. Maurice, in his own expeditions, recorded information and collected specimens on the plants, animals and geology of the area. In 1904, a mining surveyor named Frank George led a prospecting expedition through this region. He used Maurice's camels and equipment and travelled northwest of Lake Dey Dey and across the border to the salt lakes in Western Australia. George named Lake Maurice, and he reported that the area was not likely to contain anything suitable for mining.

The area around the lake was affected by the nuclear-weapon tests done during the 1950s. Dozens of Aboriginal families were removed from their ancestral lands and settled in towns far to the north (Ernabella), south (Yalata and Ooldea) and west (Cundeelee and Warburton). In the late 1940s, a single officer, Walter MacDougall, was sent to warn people in the area of the coming tests. The fallout from the hydrogen bombs was expected to harm or kill anyone within range. Officially, all were forced to leave their lands and were not allowed within 200 km of ground zero. Given that only one officer and an assistant were assigned to warn the people who lived across this huge area, many of the people were never informed, nor did they leave the area. Planes dropped information leaflets across the area, but the natives could not read the leaflets and were wary or afraid of the aircraft.
