= Jabs =

Jabs is a surname. Notable people with the surname include:

- Douglas Jabs, American ophthalmologist
- Ethylin Wang Jabs, American physician and scientist
- Hans-Joachim Jabs (1917–2003), German fighter pilot
- Jake Jabs, American businessman and philanthropist
- Matthias Jabs (born 1955), German musician, lead guitarist of The Scorpions

See also:

- Lake Jabs, Antarctica
