= Pterostylis spathulata =

Spoon-lipped rufous greenhood

Conservation status
- Priority One — Poorly Known Taxa (DEC)

Scientific classification
- Kingdom: Plantae
- Clade: Tracheophytes
- Clade: Angiosperms
- Clade: Monocots
- Order: Asparagales
- Family: Orchidaceae
- Subfamily: Orchidoideae
- Tribe: Cranichideae
- Genus: Pterostylis
- Species: P. spathulata

Binomial name
- Pterostylis spathulata M.A.Clem.

Synonyms
- Oligochaetochilus spathulata Szlach. orth. var.; Oligochaetochilus spathulatus (M.A.Clem.) Szlach.; Pterostylis sp. 'straight tops'; Pterostylis sp. 'straight tops'; Pterostylis spathulata D.L.Jones nom. inval.

Species of orchid

Pterostylis spathulata, commonly known as spoon-lipped rufous greenhood or Moora rustyhood, is a plant in the orchid family Orchidaceae and is endemic to the south-west of Western Australia. Both flowering and non-flowering plants have a relatively large rosette of leaves. Flowering plants also have up to ten or more white and green or brown flowers with fine, upturned tips on the lateral sepals and a spoon-shaped, insect-like labellum.

== Description ==
Pterostylis spathulata is a terrestrial, perennial, deciduous, herb with an underground tuber and a rosette of between six and ten leaves. The leaves are 20–45 mm (0.8–2 in) long and 7–14 mm (0.3–0.6 in) wide. Flowering plants have a rosette at the base of the flowering stem but the leaves are usually withered by flowering time. Up to ten or more white and green or brown flowers are borne on a flowering stem 150–350 mm (6–10 in) tall. The flowers lean forward and are 20–22 mm (0.8–0.9 in) long and 7–9 mm (0.3–0.4 in) wide. The dorsal sepal and petals form a hood or "galea" over the column with the dorsal sepal having a thread-like tip 9–11 mm (0.35–0.43 in) long. The lateral sepals turn downwards, the same width as the galea, deeply dished, hairy and suddenly taper to narrow tips 18–22 mm (0.7–0.9 in) long which turn forward and upward. The labellum is cup-shaped and insect-like, about 5 mm (0.2 in) long, 3 mm (0.1 in) wide with six to eight long hairs on each side of the "body". Flowering occurs from September to November.

== Taxonomy and naming ==
Pterostylis spathulata was first formally described in 1989 by Mark Clements from a specimen collected near Moora and the description was published in Australian Orchid Research. The specific epithet (spathulata) is derived from the Latin word spatha meaning "spoon" referring to the spoon-shaped labellum of this orchid.

== Distribution and habitat ==
Spoon-lipped rufous greenhood grows in woodland and shrubland and on granite outcrops between Mullewa and the Fitzgerald River in the Avon Wheatbelt, Coolgardie, Mallee, Murchison, Swan Coastal Plain and Yalgoo biogeographic regions.

== Conservation ==
Pterostylis spathulata is classified as "not threatened" by the Western Australian Government Department of Parks and Wildlife.
