= Zvezda =

Zvezda means "star" in some Slavic languages, and may refer to:

== Entertainment ==
- Zvezda (magazine), Russian literary magazine
- Zvezda (TV channel), Russian TV channel
- Star (2014 film), a Russian film
- The Star (1953 film), a Russian film
- The Star (2002 film), a Russian film
- Zvezda (cinema) a squatted cinema in Belgrade
- Zvezda, Serbian literary journal founded and edited by Serbian writer Janko Veselinović

== Places ==
- Lake Zvezda, Antarctica
- Zvezda, Burgas Province, Bulgaria
- Zvezda, Targovishte Province, a village in Targovishte Province, Bulgaria
- Zvezde, Village in Albania

== Space ==
- Zvezda (ISS module), component of the International Space Station
- Zvezda (moonbase), non-realized Soviet moonbase as well as a fictional Soviet base on the moon in the lunar south pole in the For All Mankind TV Series.
- Zvezda spaceplane, a Soviet spaceplane project; see Buran programme#History of the Buran programme
- NPP Zvezda, Russian aeronautical and space manufacturer
- Soyuz 7K-VI Zvezda, non-realized Soviet crewed capsule spacecraft for military goals

== Sports ==
- Zvezda Stadium, a multi-use stadium in Perm, Russia
- FK Crvena zvezda or Red Star Belgrade, a Serbian football club
- FC Zvezda-BGU Minsk, a Belarusian football team
- FC Zvezda Irkutsk, a Russian football team
- FC Zvezda Saint Petersburg, a Russian football team playing in the Professional Football League
- Zvezda-2005 Perm, a women's football team from Perm

== Other uses ==
- Zvezda (company), Russian scale models company
- Zvezda (newspaper), Russian émigré weekly converted into the Bolsheviks' Pravda
- Zvezda (watch), line of Soviet watches produced by the Petrodvorets Watch Factory from 1945 to the late 1960s
- Zvezda M503, diesel engine built in the 1970s by the Soviet Union
- Zvezda shipyard DVZ, large east Russian shipbuilding wharf
- The titular fictional organization in the anime World Conquest Zvezda Plot

== See also ==
- Krasnaya Zvezda, the official newspaper of the Russian Ministry of Defence
- Zviazda, a newspaper in Belarus
- Zvijezda (disambiguation)
