= Lists of lagoons =

Lists of lagoons:

- List of lagoons of Albania
- List of lagoons of Australia
- List of lagoons of California, United States
- List of lagoons of New Zealand
- List of lagoons of South Africa
