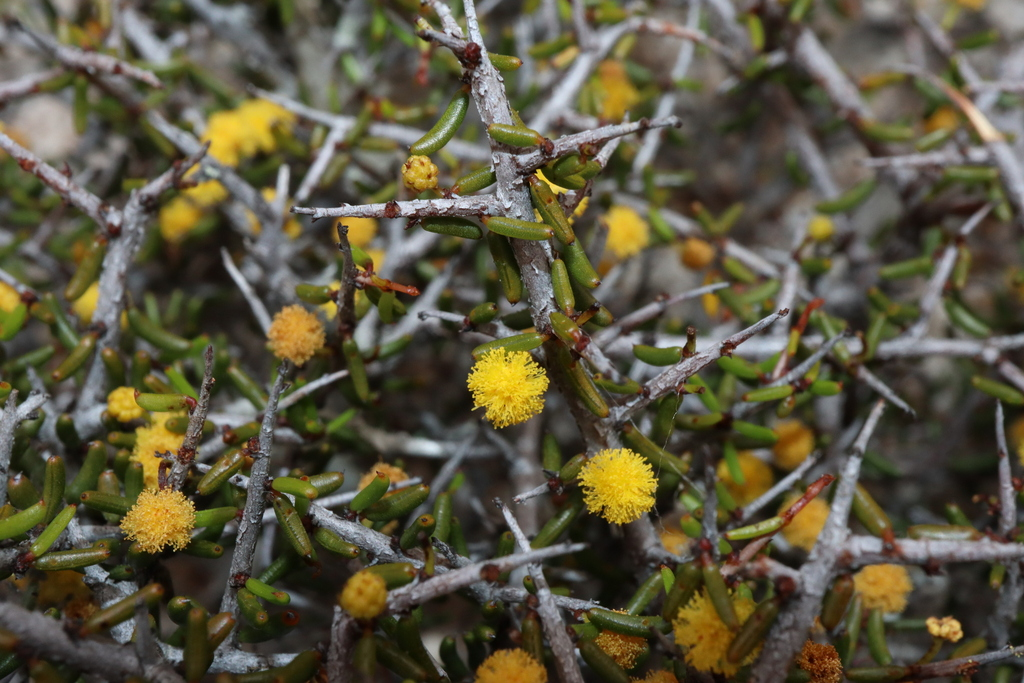

Conservation status
- Priority One — Poorly Known Taxa (DEC)

Scientific classification
- Kingdom: Plantae
- Clade: Tracheophytes
- Clade: Angiosperms
- Clade: Eudicots
- Clade: Rosids
- Order: Fabales
- Family: Fabaceae
- Subfamily: Caesalpinioideae
- Clade: Mimosoid clade
- Genus: Acacia
- Species: A. diminuta

Binomial name
- Acacia diminuta Maslin

= Acacia diminuta =

Species of legume

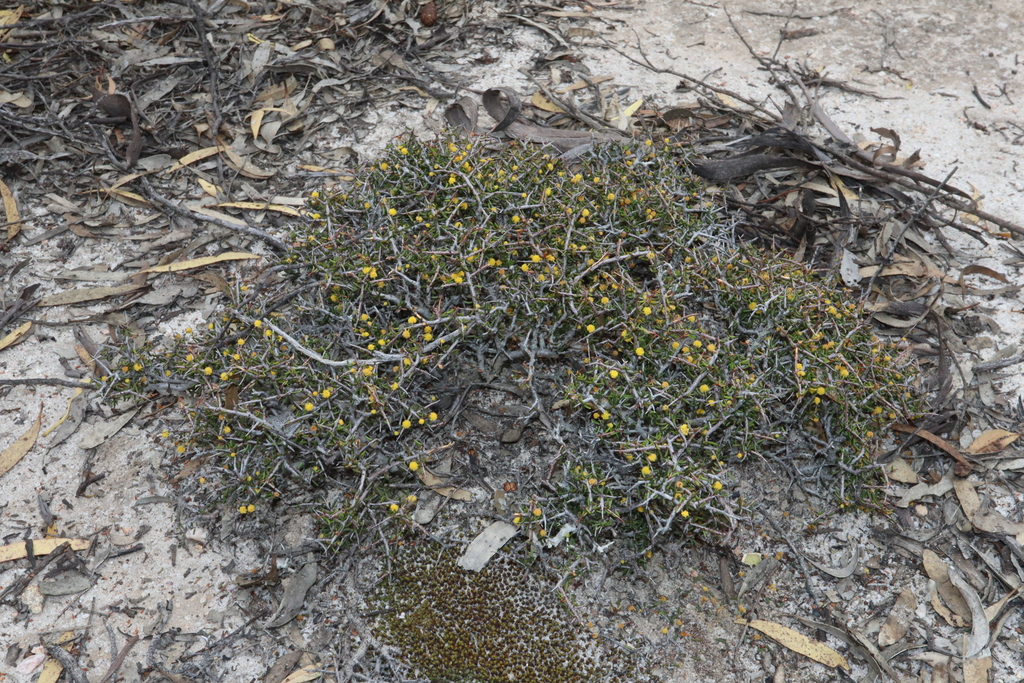
Habit in Lake Magenta Nature Reserve

Acacia diminuta is a species of flowering plant in the family Fabaceae and is endemic to a small area of southern Western Australia. It is an intricately branched, spreading shrub with sharply pointed branchlets, more or less linear to oblong phyllodes, spherical heads of cream-coloured or yellow flowers and oblong to elliptic pods.

== Description ==
Acacia diminuta is an intricately branched, spreading, glabrous shrub that typically grows to a height of up to 20 cm (7.9 in) and has light grey, sharply pointed branchlets. Its phyllodes are sometimes grouped on knotty branchlets, more or less linear to oblong, 3–5 mm (0.12–0.20 in) long and 0.7–1 mm (0.028–0.039 in) wide with a point near the end. There is sometimes a gland on the upper edge near the middle of the phyllode. The flowers are borne in a spherical head in axils on a peduncle 2.5–4 mm (0.098–0.157 in) long, each head about 2 mm (0.079 in) in diameter with about 15 cream-coloured or yellow flowers. Flowering has been recorded in October and November, and the immature pods are up to 20 mm (0.79 in) long, 4–5 mm (0.16–0.20 in) wide and slightly constricted between the seeds. The immature seeds are oblong to elliptic, up to 5 mm (0.20 in) and dull brown.

== Taxonomy ==
Acacia diminuta was first formally described in 1999 by Bruce Maslin in the journal Nuytsia from specimens collected by Alex George west of Ravensthorpe in 1965. The specific epithet (diminuta) means 'made small' or 'diminished', referring to the small size of the plant, its phyllodes, flowers and heads.

== Distribution and habitat ==
This species of wattle is only known form a few scattered polaces between Jerramungup and Scaddan where it grows in sand clay in scrub mallee in the Mallee bioregion of southern Western Australia.

== Conservation status ==
Acacia diminuta is listed as "Priority One" by the Government of Western Australia Department of Biodiversity, Conservation and Attractions, meaning that it is known from only one or a few locations that are potentially at risk.

== See also ==
- List of Acacia species
