= List of lagoons of Australia =

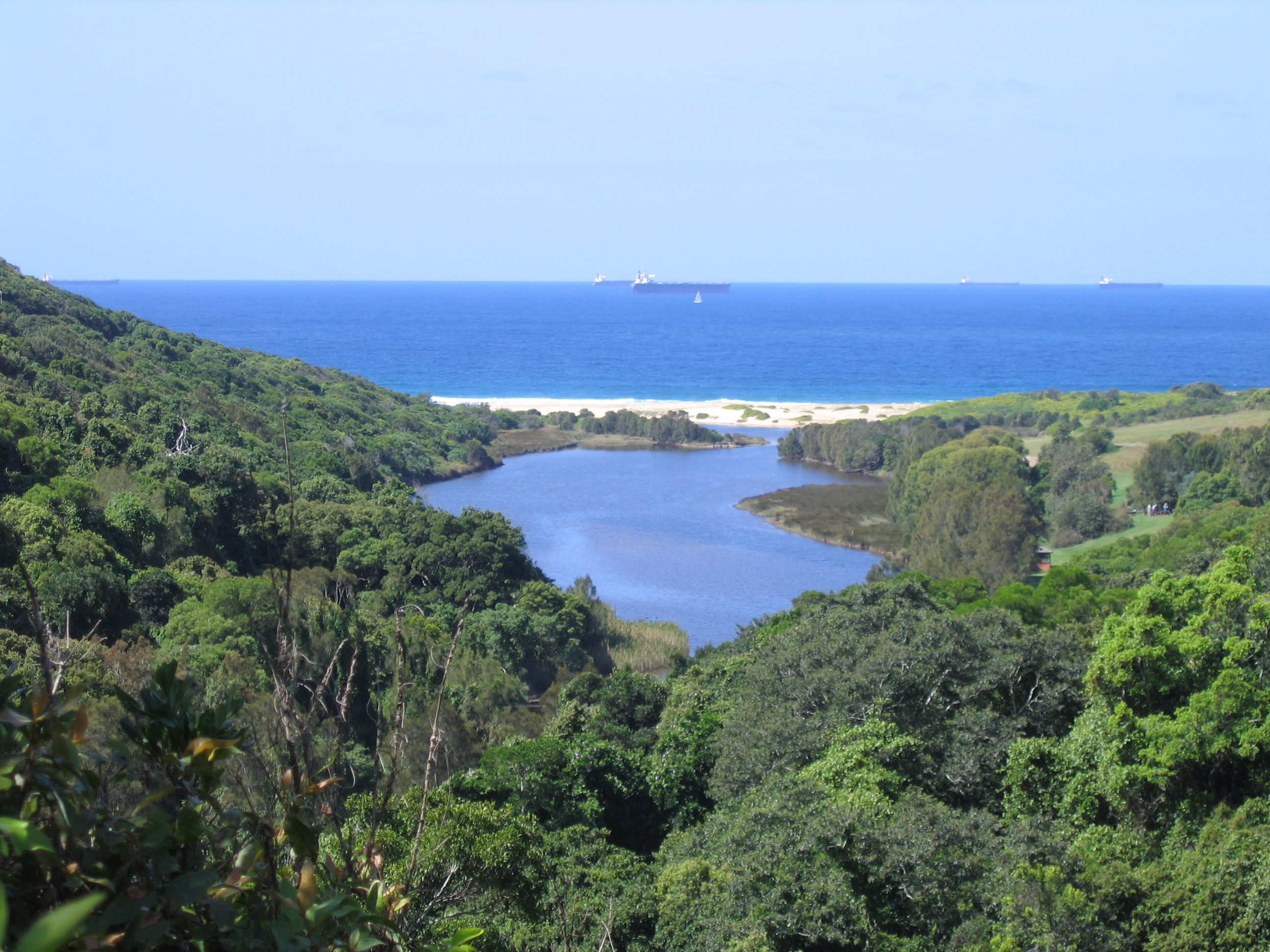
Glenrock Lagoon in New South Wales

This is a list of lagoons of Australia. Coastal lagoons in Australia are most common on the south-east coast, south-west coast, and in the Gulf of Carpentaria in the north.

- Avoca Lake, New South Wales (formerly Avoca Lagoon and Bulbararing Lagoon)
- Bears Lagoon, Victoria
- Blue Lagoon, Lizard Island, Queensland
- Boobera Lagoon, New South Wales
- Bool Lagoon Game Reserve, South Australia
- Boyd Lagoon, Western Australia
- Bronte Lagoon, Tasmania
- Cheetham Wetlands, Victoria (420 hectares of lagoons)
- Dowse Lagoon, Queensland
- Glenrock Lagoon, New South Wales
- Goyder Lagoon, South Australia
- Hacks Lagoon Conservation Park, South Australia
- Hepburn Lagoon, Victoria
- Hutt Lagoon, Western Australia
- Knuckey Lagoons Conservation Reserve, Northern Territory
- Lake Illawarra, New South Wales
- Lake Macquarie (New South Wales)
- Jocks Lagoon, Tasmania
- Little Lagoon, Groote Eylandt, Northern Territory
- Little Pine Lagoon, Tasmania
- Little Waterhouse Lake, Tasmania
- Logan Lagoon, Tasmania
- McMinns Lagoon, Northern Territory
- Moulting Lagoon Important Bird Area, Tasmania
- Nadgee Lake in Nadgee Nature Reserve, New South Wales
- Orielton Lagoon, Tasmania
- Paranki Lagoon Conservation Park, South Australia
- Pelican Lagoon, South Australia
- Southport Lagoon, Tasmania
- Terrigal Lagoon, New South Wales
- Wamberal Lagoon, New South Wales
- Wattamolla, New South Wales
