= Eucalyptus vokesensis =

Vokes Hill mallee

Scientific classification
- Kingdom: Plantae
- Clade: Embryophytes
- Clade: Tracheophytes
- Clade: Spermatophytes
- Clade: Angiosperms
- Clade: Eudicots
- Clade: Rosids
- Order: Myrtales
- Family: Myrtaceae
- Genus: Eucalyptus
- Species: E. vokesensis

Binomial name
- Eucalyptus vokesensis D.Nicolle & L.A.S.Johnson

Species of eucalyptus

Eucalyptus vokesensis, commonly known as the Vokes Hill mallee, is a species of mallee that is endemic to South Australia. It has rough bark on the lower stems and larger branches, broadly lance-shaped to broadly egg-shaped adult leaves, flower buds in group of nine to thirteen, pale yellow flowers and cup-shaped to barrel-shaped fruit.

== Description ==
Eucalyptus vokesensis is a mallee that typically grows to a height of 7 m (23 ft) and forms a lignotuber. It has rough, fibrous grey to grey-brown bark on the stems and larger branches, with smooth tan, grey, or cream-coloured bark above. Young plants and coppice regrowth have stems that are usually square in cross-section and leaves that are egg-shaped to lance-shaped or elliptical and usually glaucous. Adult leaves are the same dull bluish green to glaucous on both sides, broadly egg-shaped to broadly lance-shaped, 70–110 mm (2.8–4.3 in) long and 20–54 mm (0.79–2.13 in) wide, tapering to a petiole 19–27 mm (0.75–1.06 in) long. The flower buds are arranged in leaf axils in groups of nine to thirteen on an unbranched peduncle 9–22 mm (0.35–0.87 in) long, the individual buds on pedicels 5–9 mm (0.20–0.35 in) long. Mature buds are oval, 12–20 mm (0.47–0.79 in) long and 5–8 mm (0.20–0.31 in) wide with a beaked or horn-shaped operculum that is longer than the floral cup. Flowering has been recorded from July to September and the flowers are pale yellow. The fruit is a woody cup-shaped to barrel-shaped capsule 7–10 mm (0.28–0.39 in) long and 6–9 mm (0.24–0.35 in) wide and the valves below rim level, but with the fragile style remnants protruding. The seeds are oval, dark brown to grey and 1.5–2.5 mm (0.059–0.098 in) long.

== Taxonomy ==
Eucalyptus vokesensis was first formally described in 1999 by Dean Nicolle and Lawrence Alexander Sidney Johnson in the journal Telopea, included in a paper by Johnson and Ken Hill. The type specimens were collected by Joseph Zvonko Weber (1930-1996), 130 km (81 mi) north of Cook on the road to Vokes Hill. The specific epithet comes from the locality in which the type specimen was found. Vokes Hill was named during an expedition by explorer Richard Maurice in 1901. His general hand and cook on the journey was W. Voke or Voakes.

== Distribution and habitat ==
The species is endemic to an arid area of western South Australia in the Great Victoria Desert where it grows in deep red sandy soils on and around sand dunes and broad swales in open mallee communities.

== See also ==
- List of Eucalyptus species
