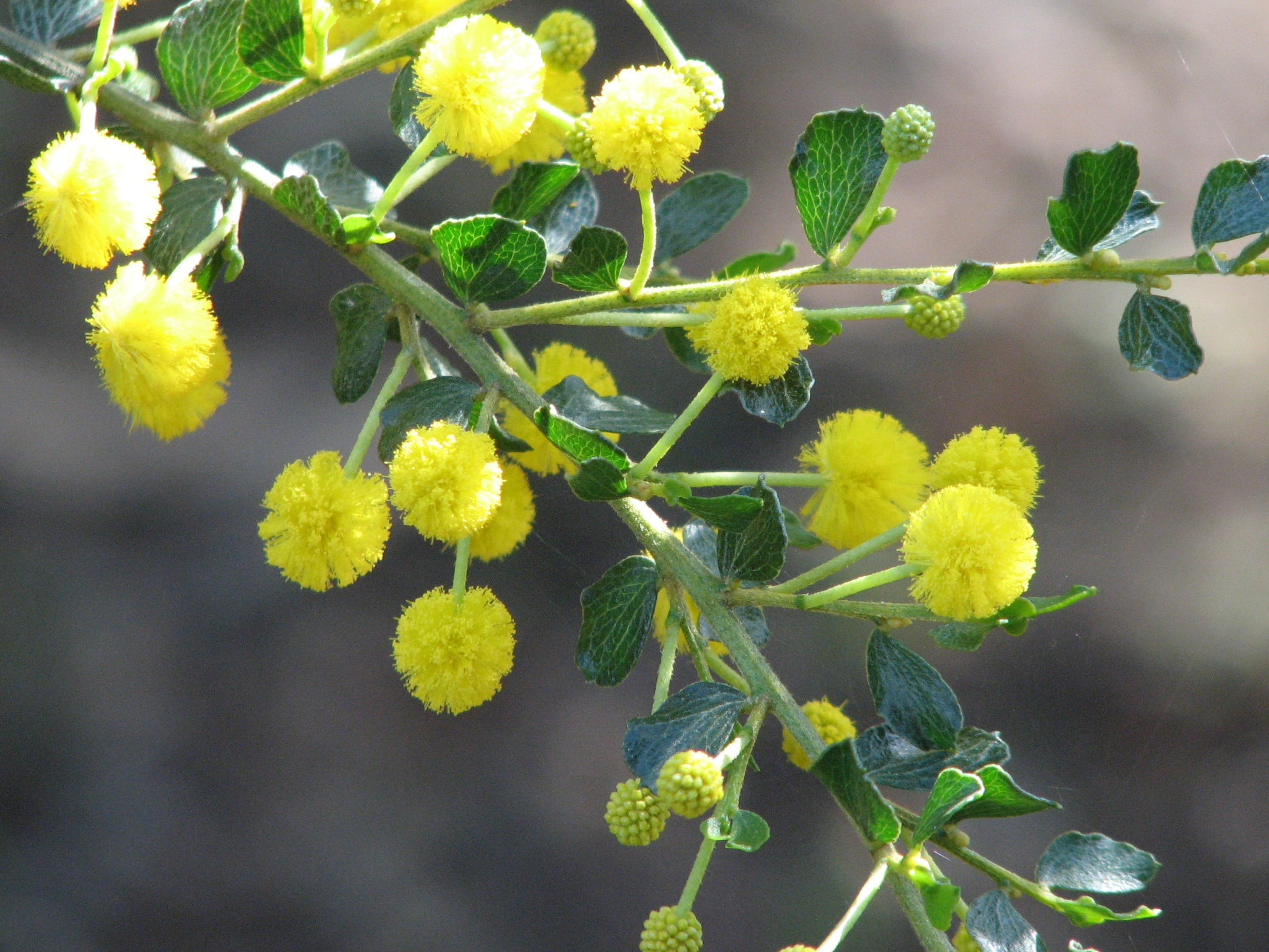

Scientific classification
- Kingdom: Plantae
- Clade: Tracheophytes
- Clade: Angiosperms
- Clade: Eudicots
- Clade: Rosids
- Order: Fabales
- Family: Fabaceae
- Subfamily: Caesalpinioideae
- Clade: Mimosoid clade
- Genus: Acacia
- Species: A. dictyoneura

Binomial name
- Acacia dictyoneura E.Pritz.
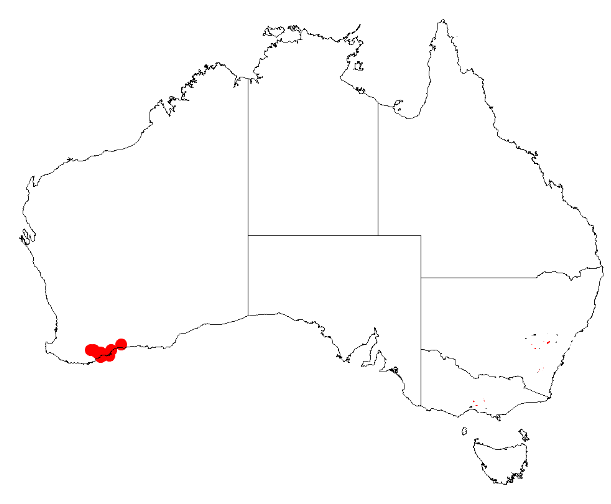
- Occurrence data from AVH

Synonyms
- Racosperma dictyoneurum (E.Pritz.) Pedley

= Acacia dictyoneura =

Species of legume

Acacia dictyoneura is a species of flowering plant in the family Fabaceae and is endemic to the south coast of Western Australia. It is a cone-shaped shrub with erect, oval or elliptic phyllodes, spherical or oblong heads of yellow flowers and narrowly oblong pods.

== Description ==
Acacia dictyoneura is a cone-shaped shrub with the narrower end towards the base, that typically grows to 0.5 to 2 m (1 ft 8 in to 6 ft 7 in) high and has branchlets with a few soft hairs pressed against the surface and sticky on the ends. Its phyllodes are erect, obliquely oval or elliptic, 6–5 mm (0.24–0.20 in) long, 4–9 mm (0.16–0.35 in) wide and wavy with narrowly triangular stipules 0.5–1 mm (0.020–0.039 in) long at the base. There are two or three raised main veins on the phyllodes with a network of veins between them. The flowers are borne in one or two spherical or oblong heads in axils on a peduncle 5–10 mm (0.20–0.39 in) long, each head about 5 mm (0.20 in) in diameter with 45 to 60 yellow flowers. Flowering occurs from August to November, and the pods are narrowly oblong, up to 30 mm (1.2 in) long and 4–7 mm (0.16–0.28 in) wide and covered with soft hairs. The seeds are egg-shaped, 3.0–3.5 mm (0.12–0.14 in) long and brown with an aril on the end.

== Taxonomy ==
Acacia dictyoneura was formally described in 1904 by German botanist Ernst Pritzel in Botanische Jahrbücher für Systematik, Pflanzengeschichte und Pflanzengeographie, based on plant material collected near Cape Riche. The specific epithet (dictyoneura) means 'net-veined'.

== Distribution and habitat ==
This species of wattle is known only from the drainages of the Pallinup and Fitzgerald Rivers as far north as Borden in the Esperance Plains and Mallee bioregions of southern Western Australia, where it grows on river banks and on gentle slopes in loamy soils.

== Conservation status ==
Acacia dictyoneura is listed as "not threatened" by the Government of Western Australia Department of Parks and Wildlife.

== See also ==
- List of Acacia species
