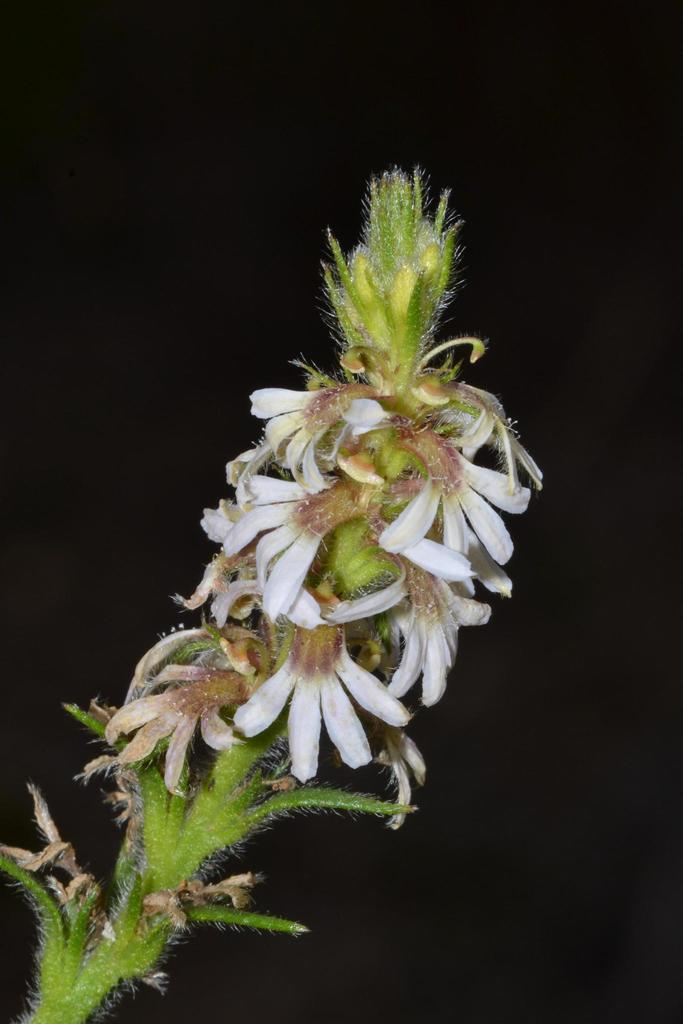

Scientific classification
- Kingdom: Plantae
- Clade: Embryophytes
- Clade: Tracheophytes
- Clade: Angiosperms
- Clade: Eudicots
- Clade: Asterids
- Order: Asterales
- Family: Goodeniaceae
- Genus: Scaevola
- Species: S. lanceolata

Binomial name
- Scaevola lanceolata Benth.
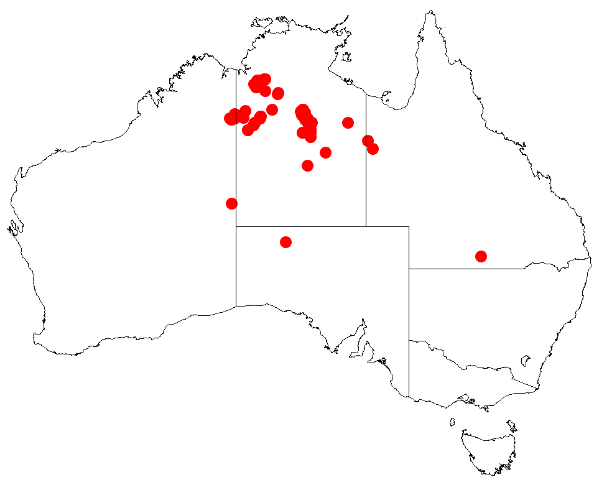
- Occurrence data from AVH

Synonyms
- List: Lobelia lanceolata (Benth.) Kuntze nom. illeg.; Lobelia longifolia (de Vriese) Kuntze nom. illeg.; Merkusia anchusaefolia var. lanceolata de Vriese orth. var.; Merkusia anchusifolia var. lanceolata (Benth.) de Vriese; Merkusia longifolia (de Vriese) de Vriese; Scaevola lanceolata Benth. var. lanceolata; Scaevola lasiantha F.Muell.; Scaevola longifolia de Vriese

= Scaevola lanceolata =

Species of shrub

Scaevola lanceolata, commonly known as long-leaved scaevola, is a species of flowering plant in the family Goodeniaceae and is endemic to the south-west of Western Australia. It is an erect perennial herb with linear to lance-shaped leaves with the narrower end towards the base, white to pale blue flowers with brownish markings, and rough, more or less spherical fruit.

== Description ==
Scaevola lanceolatais an erect, perennial herb that typically grows to a height of up to 10–50 cm (3.9–19.7 in) and has many stems. Its leaves are linear to lance-shaped with the narrower end towards the base, 60–200 mm (2.4–7.9 in) long and 1–10 mm (0.039–0.394 in) wide, mostly towards the base of the stem. The flowers are borne in spikes up to 100 mm (3.9 in) long on the ends of stems, with lance-shaped bracts up to 40 mm (1.6 in) long and linear bracteoles up to 6 mm (0.24 in) long. The sepals form a toothed tube up to 2 mm (0.079 in) long, and the petals 7–15 mm (0.28–0.59 in) long, white to pale blue with brownish markings, hairy outside and bearded inside. Flowering mainly occurs from August to December, and the fruit is more or less spherical, up to 4 mm (0.16 in) in diameter, rough, sometimes covered with soft hairs, otherwise glabrous.

== Taxonomy ==
Scaevola lanceolata was first formally described in 1837 by George Bentham in Enumeratio plantarum quas in Novae Hollandiae ora austro-occidentali ad fluvium Cygnorum et in sinu Regis Georgii collegit Carolus Liber Baro de Hügel from specimens collected in the Swan River Colony by Charles von Hügel. The specific epithet (lanceolata) means 'lanceolate'.

== Distribution and habitat ==
This species of scaevola grows in heath between the Murchison and Fitzgerald Rivers in the Avon Wheatbelt, Esperance Plains, Geraldton Sandplains, Jarrah Forest, Swan Coastal Plain and Warren bioregions in the south-west of Western Australia.

== Conservation status ==
Scaevola lanceolata is listed as 'not threatened' by the Government of Western Australia Department of Biodiversity, Conservation and Attractions.
