= Lake Newell (Western Australia) =

Lake in Western Australia

- Location in Western Australia
- Interactive map of Lake Newell
- Location: Goldfields-Esperance, Western Australia
- Coordinates: 24°50′45″S 126°10′52″E
- Basin countries: Australia
- Surface area: 26 km^{2} (10 sq mi)

Lake Newell is a lake in the Gibson Desert, in the Goldfields-Esperance region of Western Australia, northeast of Lake Breaden. It covers an area of roughly 2,600 hectares (6,400 acres).

The closest major settlement to the lake is Warburton.

== See also ==
- List of lakes of Australia § Western Australia
