= Acacia dermatophylla =

Scientific classification
- Kingdom: Plantae
- Clade: Tracheophytes
- Clade: Angiosperms
- Clade: Eudicots
- Clade: Rosids
- Order: Fabales
- Family: Fabaceae
- Subfamily: Caesalpinioideae
- Clade: Mimosoid clade
- Genus: Acacia
- Species: A. dermatophylla

Binomial name
- Acacia dermatophylla Benth.
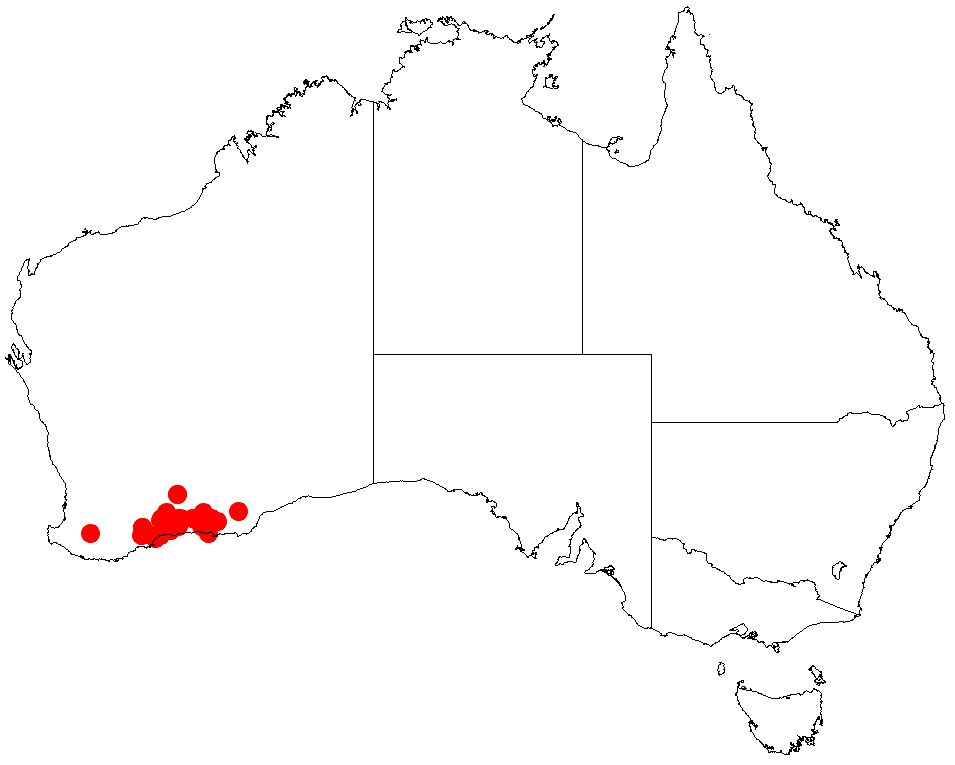
- Occurrence data from AVH

Synonyms
- Racosperma dermatophyllum (Benth.) Pedley

Species of legume

Habit near Mount Madden

Acacia dermatophylla is a species of flowering plant in the family Fabaceae and is endemic to the south of Western Australia. It is an open, often wispy, single-stemmed shrub with lance-shaped phyllodes with the narrower end towards the base, erect stipules, spherical heads of golden yellow flowers and glabrous, narrowly oblong, hard and bony pods.

== Description ==
Acacia dermatophylla is an open, often wispy, single stemmed shrub that typically grows to a height of 20–50 cm (1–2 ft) and has glabrous branchlets. Its phyllodes are lance-shaped with the narrower end towards the base, or linear, 20–55 mm (0.79–2.17 in) long and 4–15 mm (0.16–0.59 in) wide, thickly leathery and sharply pointed. There are persistent, erect, shallowly curved stipules, 4–8 mm (0.16–0.31 in) long and sometimes sharply pointed at the base of the phyllodes. The phyllodes are more or less glaucous with a prominent midrib and there is a gland at about 6 mm (0.24 in) above the base. The flowers are borne in spherical heads in two racemes in axils on a peduncle mostly 5.5–15 mm (0.22–0.59 in) long, each head 5–7 mm (0.20–0.28 in) in diameter with 20 to 40 golden yellow flowers. Flowering occurs from July to October, and the pods are narrowly oblong, more or less biconvex and not constricted between the seeds, up to 65 mm (2.6 in) long, 8–10 mm (0.31–0.39 in) wide, hard, bony and glabrous. The seeds are oblong to broadly elliptic, about 5 mm (0.20 in) long and dull brown with a crest-like aril on the end.

== Taxonomy ==
Acacia dermatophylla was first formally described in 1864 by the botanist George Bentham in his Flora Australiensis from "specimens collected near the Murchison River" by Augustus Oldfield. The specific epithet (dermatophylla) means 'skin-leaved', referring to the smooth phyllodes.

== Distribution and habitat ==
This species of wattle grows in sandy loam or clay on undulating plains, low-lying areas and near salt flats from near the Fitzgerald River to near Ponier Rock about 65 km (40 mi) south-west of Balladonia in the Esperance Plains and Mallee bioregions of Western Australia. The type specimens is reported to come from the Murchison River, but it is the only specimen collected north of Perth, and may well be an error, because Olfield collected both north and south of Perth.

== Conservation status ==
Acacia dermatophylla is listed as 'Not threatened' by the Government of Western Australia Department of Biodiversity, Conservation and Attractions.

== See also ==
- List of Acacia species
