= Seagull Lake =

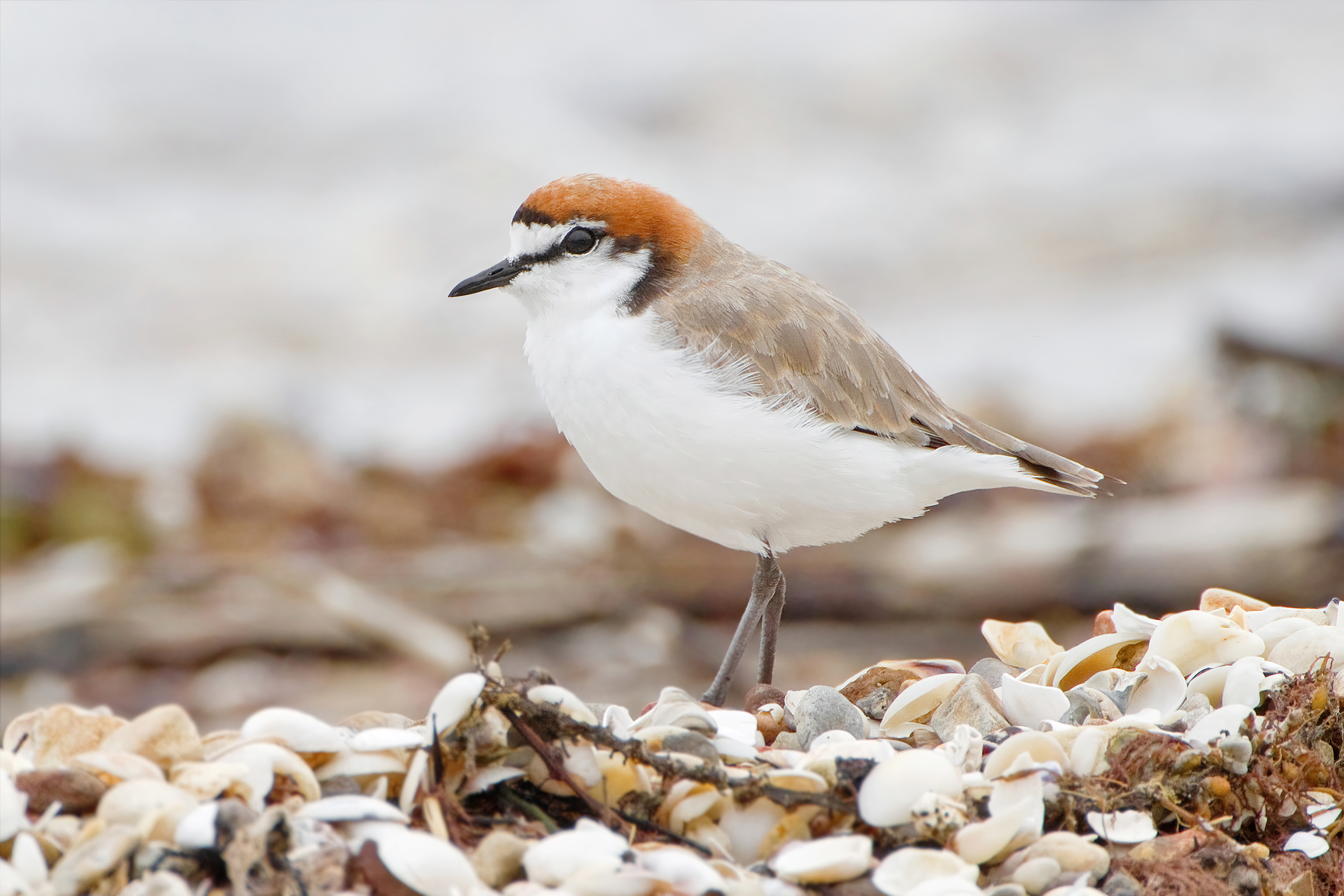
- Red-capped plovers are found at the lake

- Location in South Australia
- Location: Yanerbie, South Australia
- Coordinates: 32°57′34″S 134°12′50″E
- Type: Salt lake
- Basin countries: Australia
- Surface area: 88 hectares (220 acres)

The Seagull Lake is sub-coastal saline lake fed by a marine spring in the locality of Yanerbie on the western side of the Eyre Peninsula in South Australia within the boundaries of the Sceale Bay Conservation Park. It lies about 20 kilometres (12 mi) south of Streaky Bay and 280 kilometres (170 mi) north of Port Lincoln.

== Description ==
The 88-hectare (220-acre) sub-coastal lake was reported in 2010 as being "dominated by Zostera and Ruppia marine seagrasses". There are grassed sand-dunes on the west between the lake and the bay. On the east the lake is bordered by about a kilometre of whipstick mallee and paperbarks, before a series of ephemeral saline wetlands. The surrounds retain much native vegetation, especially samphire and halophytic shrubland. The threatened beaded samphire and west coast mintbush are found at the lake. Although some parts are permanently wet, much of the lake bed dries up during droughts.

== Protected area status ==
=== Statutory ===
Seagull Lake is within the boundaries of the Sceale Bay Conservation Park.

=== Non-statutory arrangements ===
Seagull Lake is within the boundaries of an Important Bird Area (IBA) known as the Seagull Lake Important Bird Area. The IBA was identified by BirdLife International because it regularly supports a breeding colony of fairy terns. Potential threats to the colony are from disturbance by people, vehicles and dogs, water abstraction in the catchment, and fox predation. Other birds recorded using the lake are banded stilts, red-necked avocets, red-necked stints, red-capped plovers, sharp-tailed sandpipers and hooded plovers.

== See also ==
- List of lakes of Australia § South Australia
