= Zvijezda =

Zvijezda in some Slavic languages means "star", and may refer to:

- Zvijezda (Serbia), a mountain in western Serbia
- Zvijezda, Vareš, a village in central Bosnia
- Zvijezda (Bosnia and Herzegovina), a mountain in central Bosnia
- NK Zvijezda Gradačac, a football club from Bosnia and Herzegovina
- Zvijezda (company), an edible oil manufacturing company from Croatia
- Zvijezda, Karlovac, a section of the city of Karlovac, Croatia

== See also ==
- Zvezda (disambiguation)
