= Tarrabool Lake =

Lake in Australia

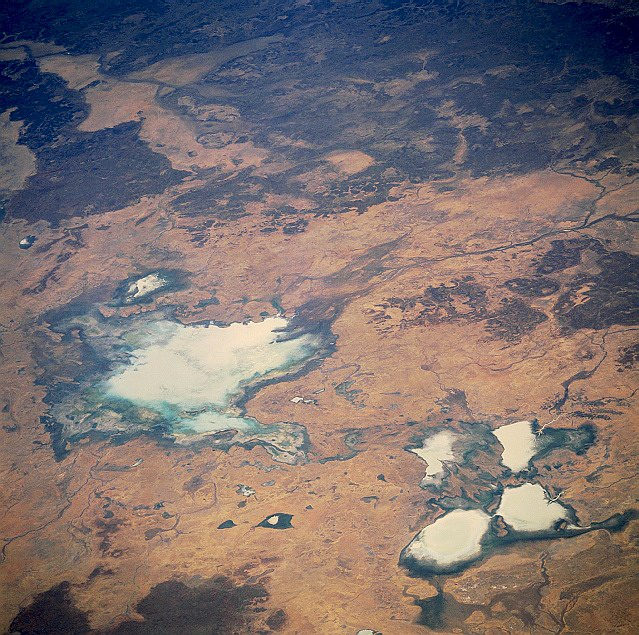
- The lake (left) as seen from space. Cluster on the right includes Corella Lake and Lake Sylvester (September 1993)

- Location within Northern Territory
- Location: Creswell, Northern Territory
- Coordinates: 18°15′35″S 135°05′53″E
- Basin countries: Australia

Tarrabool Lake is a lake in the Northern Territory of Australia in the locality of Creswell on the western fringe of the Barkly Tableland. The size of the lake fluctuates as a function of the amount of precipitation that the surrounding area receives in any given year. Although the lake is fed by several creeks, it receives most of its runoff from Creswell Creek, which enters the northeast end of the lake.

When fully inundated, Tarrabool is the largest wooded swamp in tropical Australia. It is a major breeding area for colonial water birds, especially Australian pelicans and straw-necked ibis. The lake is part of the Tarrabool Lake - Eva Downs Swamp System Important Bird Area, identified as such by BirdLife International because of its importance as a breeding site for waterbirds.
