= Lake Monginup =

Lake in Western Australia

- Lake Mongingup; Lake Mortijinup
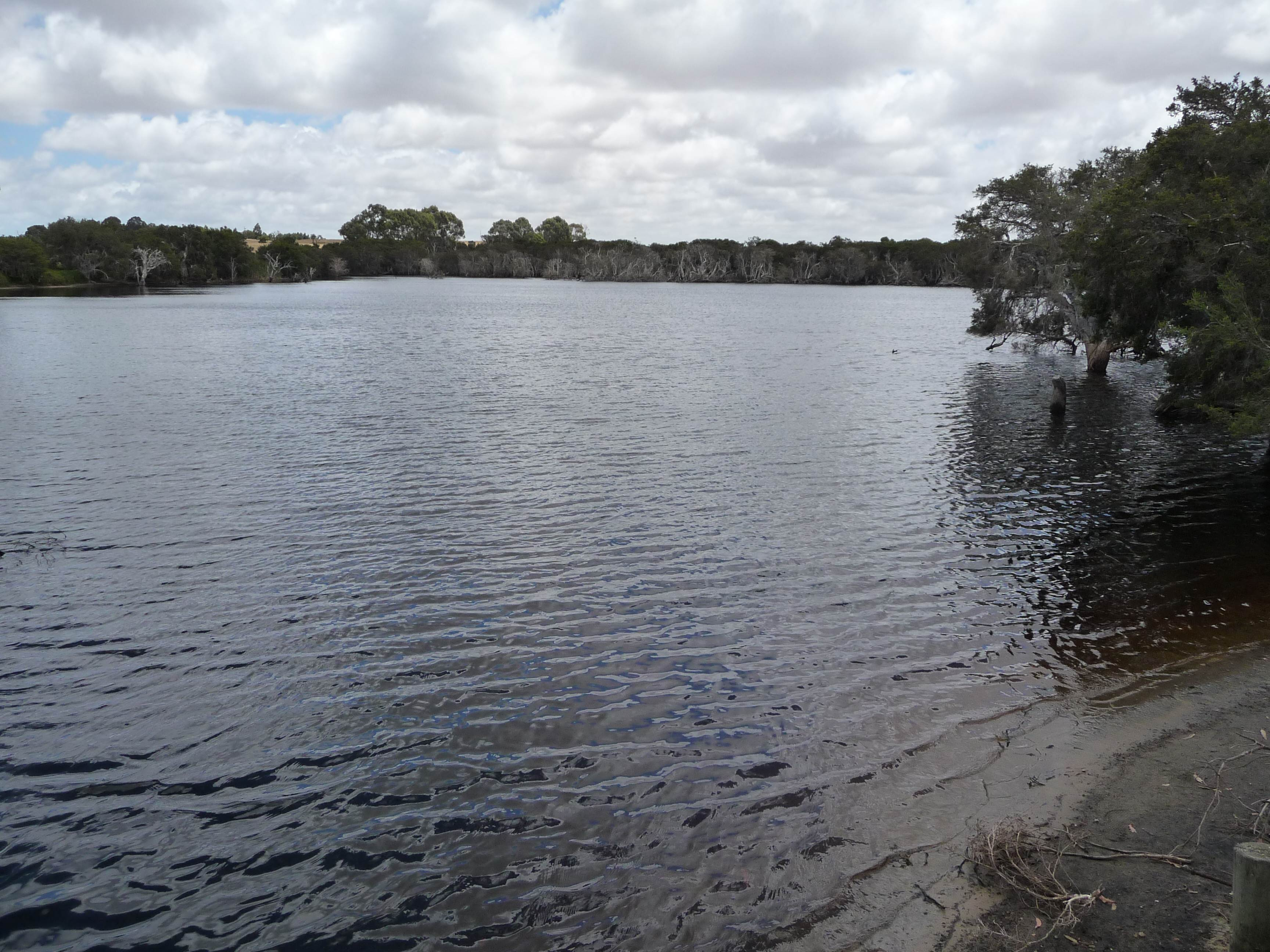

- Location in Western Australia
- Interactive map of Lake Monginup
- Location: Goldfields-Esperance, Western Australia
- Coordinates: 33°48′18″S 121°38′38″E
- Type: Freshwater
- Primary inflows: Kateup Creek
- Basin countries: Australia
- Designation: Lake Mortijinup Nature Reserve
- Max. length: 3.5 km (2.2 mi)
- Max. width: 2 km (1.2 mi)
- Surface area: 320 ha (790 acres)

Lake Monginup, also known as Lake Mongingup and Lake Mortijinup, is a freshwater lake in the Goldfields-Esperance region of Western Australia.

The lake is approximately 18 km (11 mi) west of Esperance and makes up part of the 102-hectare (252-acre) Lake Mortijinup Nature Reserve.

== Description ==
The reserve is managed by the Lake Monjingup Development Committee, which received a $32,000 Lotterywest grant in 2008 to improve facilities, manage dieback and introduce native mammals back into the area.

The area is an excellent example of undisturbed natural vegetation in the area and includes a specimen of Macrozamia dyeri that is over 1,000 years old.

The area was once used as a motorcycle track, a market garden and a watering hole for stockmen's horses.

In 1983 a group of concerned locals started a campaign to preserve the area. The group planted over 30,000 trees then extended the reserve into surrounding farmland and established over 14 km (9 mi) of walking trails.

The area is home to 90 species of birds, 18 species of lizard and 9 species of frogs, as well as honey possums, echidnas and western grey kangaroos.

The Lake Mortijinup Nature Reserve was gazetted on 6 October 1978, has a size of 4.86 square kilometres (1.88 mi^{2}) and is located in the Esperance Plains bioregion.

== See also ==
- List of lakes of Australia § Western Australia
