= Lake Dutton =

Salt lake in South Australia

- Location in South Australia
- Location: South Australia
- Coordinates: 31°46′40″S 137°08′43″E
- Type: Salt lake
- Basin countries: Australia

Lake Dutton, formerly known as Lake Gill, is a salt lake in the Australian state of South Australia, in the locality of Oakden Hills on the west side of the Stuart Highway, approximately 100 kilometres (62 mi) north-west of Port Augusta in the state's Far North region.

It was named after artist S. T. Gill by explorer John Horrocks, who accompanied Horrocks and his party on an exploration trip to the north west of South Australia in 1846. It was also the location where Horrocks accidentally shot himself on 1 September 1846 and the injuries received caused his death on 23 September 1846.

The lake was discovered again by Benjamin Herschel Babbage who reported in July 1858 in a dispatch to Francis Dutton. Later on, Commissioner of Crown Lands reported that he had named this lake after the Commissioner. Babbage's name as the name that was never changed in the official use.

== See also ==
- List of lakes of Australia § South Australia
