= Boonderoo =

Pastoral lease in Western Australia

Coordinates: 31.159°S 124.361°E

Location in Western Australia

Boonderoo Station, often referred to as Boonderoo, is a pastoral lease that operates as a sheep station.

It is located about 268 kilometres (167 mi) east of Kambalda and 287 kilometres (178 mi) north east of Norseman on the western edge of the Nullarbor plain in the Goldfields-Esperance region of Western Australia. The ephemeral lake, Lake Boonderoo, from which the property takes its name is situated within the station boundary.

Boonderoo occupies an area of 3,144 square kilometres (1,214 sq mi) and consists mostly of deflated limestone plain with open bluebush and saltbush scrubland along with bindii grasslands and has a carrying capacity of 23,457 sheep.

The property was established in the early 1960s by the McGregor family who were granted three leases for a total area of 1,000,000 acres (4,047 km^{2}) in the area. The three leases were for Boonderoo, Kanandah and Koonjarra.

== See also ==
- List of ranches and stations
