= Lake Boonderoo =

Lake in Western Australia

- Location in Western Australia
- Interactive map of Lake Boonderoo
- Location: Goldfields-Esperance, Western Australia
- Coordinates: 31°09′32″S 124°21′40″E
- Type: Ephemeral freshwater
- Primary inflows: Ponton Creek
- Basin countries: Australia
- Surface area: 25 km^{2} (9.7 sq mi)

Lake Boonderoo is an ephemeral freshwater lake in the Goldfields-Esperance region of Western Australia.

It is situated approximately 200 kilometres (124 mi) east of Kambalda on the Nullarbor Plain. The lake covers an area of roughly 2,500 hectares (6,178 acres) when full. It is fed by Ponton Creek on its north western side.

The lake lies mostly within the boundaries of Boonderoo and Kanandah Stations which were established in the 1960s and have been running cattle since 1973. The lake has filled in 1975 following heavy rain events further north near Leonora after a cyclone. The rains filled both Lake Braeside and Lake Rebecca to overflow down Ponton Creek to fill Boonderoo and expand out to an area of between 50 square kilometres (19 sq mi) to 80 square kilometres (31 sq mi). The next time the lake filled was in 1995 following Cyclone Bobby.

Lake Boonderoo is an important wetland for birds and invertebrates as it dries out and becomes increasingly saline. In 2005 the lake was found to have a 250 hectares (618 acres) infestation of the invasive weed, the tamarisk tree.

== See also ==
- List of lakes of Australia § Western Australia
