= Lake Cowan (Antarctica) =

- Location within Antarctica
- Location: Antarctica
- Coordinates: 68°32′S 78°25′E
- Type: lake

Lake Cowan (68°32′S 78°25′E) is a lake 0.5 nautical miles (0.9 km) south of Lake Vereteno in the east part of the Vestfold Hills. The lake, which resembles a seal in plan, has been visited by ANARE (Australian National Antarctic Research Expeditions) parties several seasons following 1957. Named by Antarctic Names Committee of Australia (ANCA) for D. Cowan, weather observer at Davis Station in 1969, a member of an ANARE party which passed the lake in March 1969.
