= Lake Dey Dey =

Salt lake in South Australia

- Location within South Australia
- Location: Far North, South Australia
- Coordinates: 29°11′16″S 131°2′28″E
- Type: Salt lake
- Basin countries: Australia
- Surface elevation: 208 m (682 ft)

Lake Dey Dey is one of many ephemeral salt lakes in the eastern end of the Great Victoria Desert, in the Far North region of South Australia.

== Description ==
It is normally dry, except during and after periods of heavy rainfall. It is part of the geological basin known as the Officer Basin. The larger Carle Thulka is to the south. Since 1985, Lake Dey Dey is part of the lands belonging to the Maralinga Tjarutja, a southern branch of the Pitjantjatjara. The community of Oak Valley is located nearby to the southwest.

The surface of the lake normally consists of dry clay, silt or sand, covered with a salty crust. The area around Lake Dey Dey is extremely arid, and groundwater contains high levels of salinity. The elevation of the surface above mean sea level is 208 m (682 ft).

The lake is culturally important to the Maralinga Tjarutja people. Both Dey Dey and Lake Maurice have Tjukurpa (Dreaming stories) associated with them, and access to some parts of Dey Dey is restricted to initiated individuals. The major Tjukurpa associated with Lake Dey Dey relates to Wati Kulpirr, an ancestral spirit represented by the eastern grey kangaroo.

== See also ==
- List of lakes of Australia § South Australia
