= Queerearrup Lake =

Lake in Western Australia

- Location in Western Australia
- Interactive map of Queerearrup Lake
- Location: Wheatbelt, Western Australia
- Coordinates: 33°30′34″S 117°13′58″E
- Type: saline
- Primary inflows: surface flow, groundwater
- Primary outflows: evaporation
- Catchment area: 23,000 ha (57,000 acres)
- Basin countries: Australia
- Max. length: 2.6 km (1.6 mi)
- Max. width: 1.9 km (1.2 mi)
- Surface area: 430 ha (1,100 acres)
- Max. depth: 3.1 m (10 ft)
- Shore length^{1}: 8.3 km (5.2 mi)
- Islands: 0
- Settlements: none
- ^{1} Shore length is not a well-defined measure.

Queerearrup Lake is a permanent saline lake in the Great Southern region of Western Australia located approximately 26 km (16 mi) north west of Woodanilling, 29 km (18 mi) south west of Wagin and about 230 km (140 mi) south east of Perth. It is the largest lake in the Shire of Woodanilling, the next largest being Charling Lake with an area of 800 acres (320 ha).

== Description ==
Queerearrup lake has an elongated shape with a surface area of approximately 430 ha (1,100 acres). It almost joins with Lake Charling on the west and the closest lake to the east is Lake Flagstaff. Queerearrup is part of a chain of lakes that can overflow water into the poorly defined east branch of the Beaufort River. The lake is designated for recreational use with a part around the perimeter separately designated public recreation. The remainder is part of a reserve occupying an area of 380 acres (150 ha). Most of the lake is part of the Shire of Woodanilling but the northern quarter of the lake is part of the Shire of Wagin.

== Catchment ==
The catchment area of the lake occupies approximately 23,000 ha (57,000 acres). A large proportion has been cleared for agricultural purposes. The landscape is composed of lakes and swamps with small lunettes, alluvial plains, swales and dunes on alluvial and aeolian deposits in the Beaufort River and upper Blackwood River catchment. The lake is located along an ancient drainage line. The area receives an annual rainfall of 462 mm (18.2 in) and has an annual evaporation rate of 1,826 mm (71.9 in).

== History ==
The traditional owners of the area are the Noongar peoples, who have inhabited the region for tens of thousands of years. The name of the lake is derived from the Noongar words Queer meaning 'brush wallaby' and up meaning 'place of'. European settlers arrived in the area in the late 19th century. The Queerearrup Station homestead was constructed by Thomas Cornwall on the north western side of the lake. The property was run in conjunction with nearby Beaufort Station. Land on the southern side of the lake was taken up in 65-hectare (160-acre) blocks, some of which were selected by the Thompson family with another farmer named Sam Roberts working on the eastern side.

== Flora and fauna ==
A high bank on the west contains species of Melaleuca then areas of Casuarina obesa followed by Acacia acuminata and swamp yate. The lake provides habitat for species of birds including black swans.

== Facilities ==
The lake is often used for recreational and leisure activities including skiing, swimming and picnic areas during warmer months. Parking and public toilets are available on site. Barbecues, a boat ramp and other facilities have also been constructed in the area. A swimming area on the southern shore of the lake is entered from a rock jutting into the lake, the depth of water varies from 1 to 2 m (3 ft 3 in to 6 ft 7 in).

== See also ==
- List of lakes of Australia § Western Australia
