= Horrocks Pass =

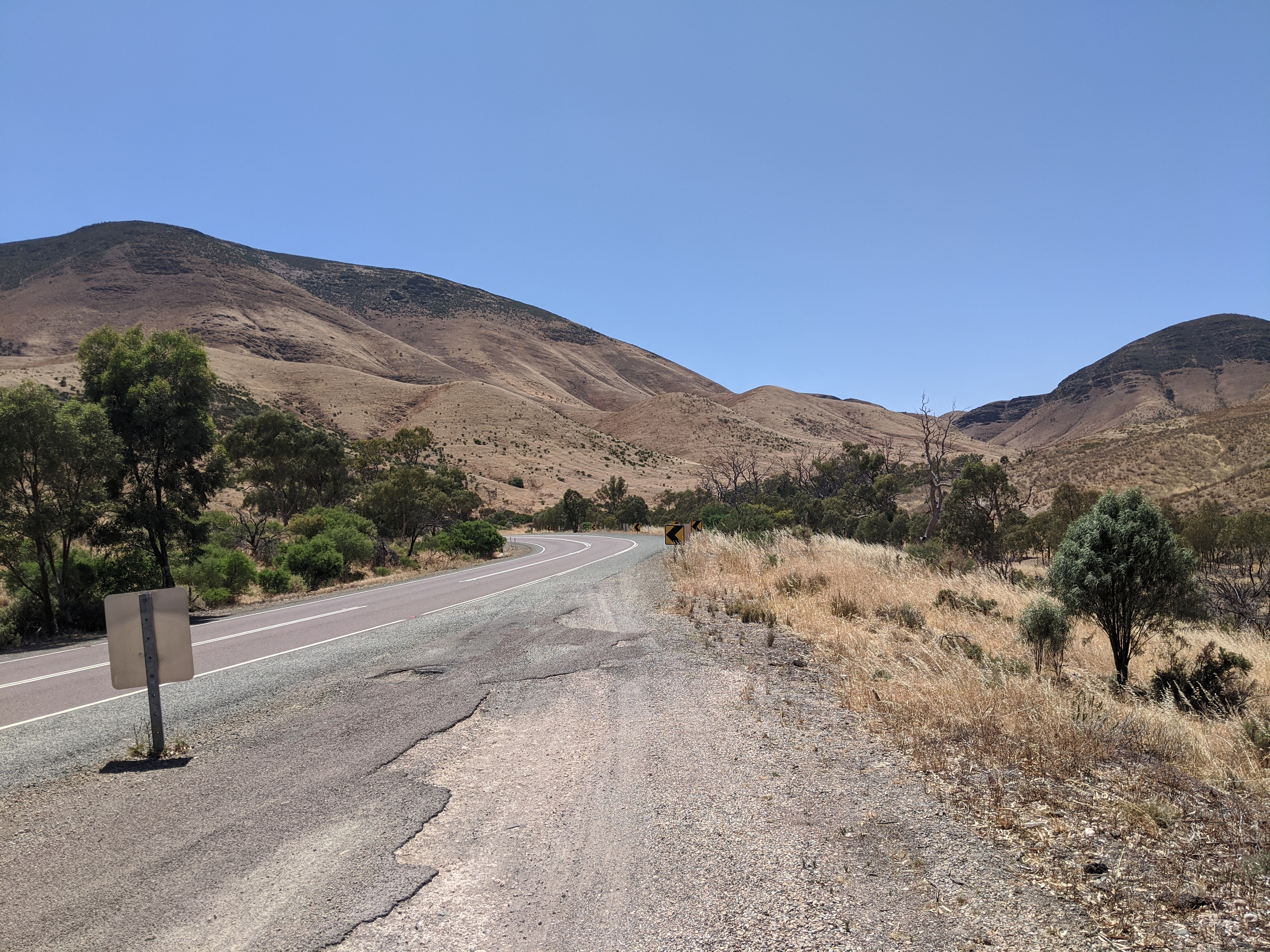
- View of Horrocks Pass facing east from Nectar Brook
- Interactive map of Horrocks Pass
- Elevation: 462 m (1,516 ft)
- Traversed by: Horrocks Pass Road

Third Approach
- Location: South Australia, Australia
- Range: Flinders Ranges
- Coordinates: 32°38′25″S 138°02′15″E

Horrocks Pass is a geographical location in the Australian state of South Australia in the localities of Nectar Brook and Woolundunga in the southern Flinders Ranges, about 6 kilometres (3.7 mi) west of the town of Wilmington. Horrocks Pass Road travels through the pass from Wilmington to the Augusta Highway in the west. It was discovered by and named after John Horrocks who travelled through the area with his party in August 1846 during his ill-fated exploration of land north of Spencer Gulf. At the top of the pass is a lookout and monument to Horrocks and his party which was erected by the District Councils of Wilmington and Port Germein and dedicated on 21 September 1946.
