= Tarrabool Lake – Eva Downs Swamp System =

Lake in Australia

Coordinates: 18°19′56″S 134°55′13″E

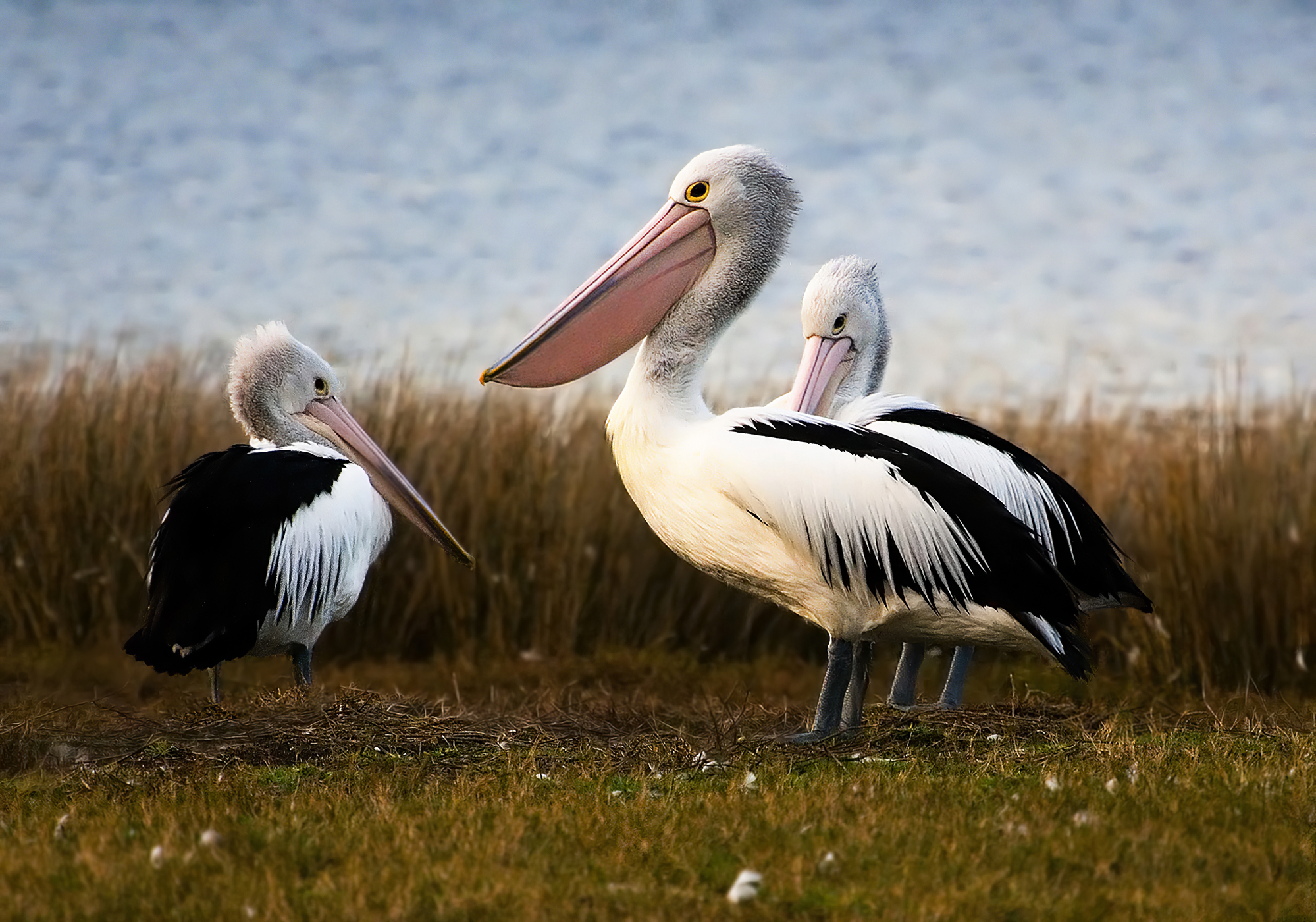
The wetlands are important as a breeding site for Australian pelicans

The Tarrabool Lake – Eva Downs Swamp System is an ephemeral wetland complex lying on the west of the Barkly Tableland region in the Northern Territory of Australia. It is listed on the DIWA wetland directory.

== Description ==
The system comprises Tarrabool Lake and a swamp to its north-west on the Eva Downs pastoral lease. In wetter years, the two water bodies merge to form a single freshwater wetland of up to 2,750 square kilometres (1,060 sq mi). Tarrabool Lake and Eva Downs Swamp are usually inundated seasonally and may retain water for a year or more after major flood events.

=== Vegetation ===
Tarrabool Lake is dominated by low, open coolibah woodland, with lignum shrubland, patches of open northern bluebush shrubland, and with extensive areas devoid of trees. The centre of Eva Downs Swamp is dominated by open belalie woodland in association with lignum shrubland, and is surrounded by northern bluebush shrubland, with tall tussock grassland to the south-east, and coolibah woodland in the south. Drying or marshy areas of the system have prolific swathes of groundcover plants such as Schoenoplectus dissachanthus. Nardoo is common.

=== Birds ===
The core of the wetland system has been identified as an 1,186-square-kilometre (458 sq mi) Important Bird Area (IBA) by BirdLife International because it supports over 200,000 waterbirds when extensively flooded. It has periodically supported over 1% of the world populations of Australian pelicans and straw-necked ibises, their breeding colonies being among the largest recorded in the Australian tropics. Other birds which have bred in the IBA in relatively large numbers include freckled ducks, great and intermediate egrets, glossy ibises, Australian terns, magpie geese, plumed whistling-ducks, grey teals and hardheads. Nationally vulnerable Australian painted snipes bred at Tarrabool in 1993.
