= Station Tarn =

Pond in Antarctica

- Location within Antarctica
- Location: Breidnes Peninsula, Vestfold Hills, Princess Elizabeth Land, Antarctica
- Coordinates: 68°35′S 77°58′E
- Type: pond

Station Tarn (68°35′S 77°58′E) is a small fresh-water pond near the west end of Breidnes Peninsula, Vestfold Hills, immediately north of Heidemann Bay in Princess Elizabeth Land in Antarctica. So named by the first ANARE (Australian National Antarctic Research Expeditions) party at Davis Station because of its proximity.
