= Collerson Lake =

- Location within Antarctica
- Location: Antarctica
- Coordinates: 68°35′S 78°11′E
- Type: glacial lake

Collerson Lake is a small, kidney-shaped glacial lake 1.5 nautical miles (3 km) southwest of Club Lake in the Vestfold Hills of Princess Elizabeth Land in Antarctica. A camp was established on the shores of this lake during geological investigations by K. Collerson, geologist at Davis Station in January 1970, for whom it was named by the Antarctic Names Committee of Australia.
