= Luncke Ridge =

Ridge in Antarctica

Luncke Ridge (68°29′S 78°25′E) is a fairly prominent ridge on the northern side of the eastern extremity of Langnes Fjord in the Vestfold Hills of Antarctica. It was mapped by Norwegian cartographers from air photos taken by the Lars Christensen Expedition, 1936–37. The ridge was seen in 1957 by an Australian National Antarctic Research Expeditions party and named for Bernhard Luncke, a Norwegian cartographer who plotted the Vestfold Hills area for the Hansen Atlas.
