= Jocks Lagoon =

Lagoon in Tasmania, Australia

- Location in Tasmania
- Coordinates: 41°20′24″S 148°18′00″E
- Type: Dystrophic
- Basin countries: Australia
- Designation: Ramsar site
- Max. length: 650 m (2,130 ft)
- Max. width: 150 m (490 ft)
- Surface area: 18 hectares (44 acres)
- Max. depth: 2–3 m (6 ft 7 in – 9 ft 10 in)

Ramsar Wetland
- Designated: 16 November 1982
- Reference no.: 258

Jocks Lagoon is an 18-hectare (44-acre) freshwater coastal lagoon in north-eastern Tasmania, Australia. In 1982, it was designated as a wetland of international importance under the Ramsar Convention.

== Description ==
The lagoon is approximately 5 kilometres (3.1 mi) south-east of the town of St Helens. It lies partly on private land and partly at the southern end of the St Helens Point conservation area. One of a chain of wetlands along St Helens Point, it is 200 to 300 metres (660 to 980 ft) inland from the coast, near a dunefield. About 650 metres (2,130 ft) long and 150 metres (490 ft) wide, it is dystrophic, with tannin-stained, low-nutrient, and acidic waters. Water levels fluctuate with rainfall and reach a depth of 2 to 3 metres (6 ft 7 in to 9 ft 10 in).

=== Vegetation ===
While the northern half of the lagoon is mainly open water, the southern half is mostly covered with emergent rushes and sedges. Threatened plants recorded from the site, or suspected to be present, include jointed twigsedge, slender twigsedge, zigzag bogsedge, yellow onion orchid and erect marshflower.

A total of 51 vascular plant species were recorded from the lagoon by a recent study. Of that total, half were species that grow in swamps or damp areas; vegetation common to dry areas, coastal woodland and Melaleuca forest made up the remainder of the list. The lagoon's aquatic flora is equally rich. Several rare species occur there.

== Ramsar criteria ==
Although Jocks Lagoon is listed as a Ramsar Site, it does not meet all four criteria that determine a site as a Ramsar Site. The lagoon does not meet criterion four, which states that a Ramsar Site is one that "supports species at critical stages or provides refuge in adverse conditions".

== See also ==
- List of Ramsar sites in Australia
- List of lakes in Australia § Tasmania
