= Lake Shaster =

Lake in Western Australia

- Location in Western Australia
- Interactive map of Lake Shaster
- Location: Goldfields-Esperance, Western Australia
- Coordinates: 33°52′29″S 120°43′13″E
- Lake type: Hypersaline
- Basin countries: Australia
- Designation: Lake Shaster Nature Reserve
- Max. length: 5 km (3.1 mi)
- Max. width: 2 km (1.2 mi)
- Surface area: 4.79 km^{2} (1.85 sq mi)
- Average depth: 1.1 m (3 ft 7 in)

Lake Shaster is a hypersaline lake in the Goldfields-Esperance region of Western Australia, approximately 90 km (56 mi) west of Esperance.

The lake is located in the Lake Shaster Nature Reserve, which is found on either side of the Oldfield Estuary Reserves. The 479-hectare (1,180-acre) lake is one of the largest lakes in the district and supports few waterbirds.

== See also ==
- List of lakes of Australia § Western Australia
