= Lake Breaden =

- Location within Western Australia
- Interactive map of Lake Breaden
- Location: Gibson Desert, Western Australia
- Coordinates: 25°47′55″S 125°37′00″E
- Type: Salt lake
- Basin countries: Australia
- Surface area: 26 km^{2} (10 sq mi)
- Surface elevation: 395 m (1,296 ft)

Lake Breaden is a salt lake in the Gibson Desert of Western Australia, to the northeast of Boyd Lagoon. It covers an area of roughly 2,600 hectares (6,400 acres) and has a surface elevation of 395 metres (1,296 ft) above sea level.

== European discovery ==
Lake Breaden was named after Joseph "Joe" A. Breaden by David Carnegie in 1896 during the Carnegie expedition through remote parts of Western Australia. Breaden was Carnegie's second in command. The expedition left Coolgardie in July 1896, proceeded as far north as Halls Creek and returned by a more easterly route arriving back at Coolgardie in August 1897.

== See also ==
- List of lakes of Australia § Western Australia
