= Red Lake (Western Australia) =

Lake in Western Australia

- Location in Western Australia
- Interactive map of Red Lake
- Location: Goldfields-Esperance, Western Australia
- Coordinates: 30°54.27′S 121°21.17′E
- Type: Ephemeral
- Basin countries: Australia
- Max. length: 5 km (3.1 mi)
- Max. width: 2 km (1.2 mi)
- Surface elevation: 338 m (1,109 ft)

Red Lake is an ephemeral salt lake in the outback of Western Australia. The lake is found approximately 18 km (11 mi) east of Coolgardie and 22 km (14 mi) south west of Kalgoorlie in the Goldfields-Esperance region of Western Australia. Its surface elevation is 338 m (1,109 ft) above mean sea-level.

The lake is part of a chain of lakes with Blue Lake to the north, Brown Lake to the south west and White Lake and Douglas Lake to the north east.
