= Lake Jabs =

Body of water

- Location within Antarctica
- Location: Breidnes Peninsula, Vestfold Hills
- Coordinates: 68°33′S 78°15′E
- Basin countries: (Antarctica)

Lake Jabs is a small lake next east of Club Lake in the central part of Breidnes Peninsula, Vestfold Hills, Antarctica. The area was photographed by U.S. Navy Operation Highjump (1946–47), Australian National Antarctic Research Expeditions (1954–58) and the Soviet Antarctic Expedition (1956). The lake was named by the Antarctic Names Committee of Australia after B.V. Jabs, a weather observer at nearby Davis Station in 1961.
