= Boyd Lagoon =

- Location in Western Australia
- Interactive map of Boyd Lagoon
- Location: Gibson Desert, Western Australia
- Coordinates: 25°57′38″S 125°20′37″E
- Type: Lagoon
- Basin countries: Australia
- Surface area: 8.7 km^{2} (3.4 sq mi)

Boyd Lagoon is a lagoon in the Gibson Desert of Western Australia, to the northwest of Tjirrkarli Community and to the southwest of Lake Breaden. It covers an area of roughly 870 hectares (2,100 acres).

== See also ==
- List of lakes of Australia § Western Australia
