= Little Waterhouse Lake =

Lake in Tasmania, Australia

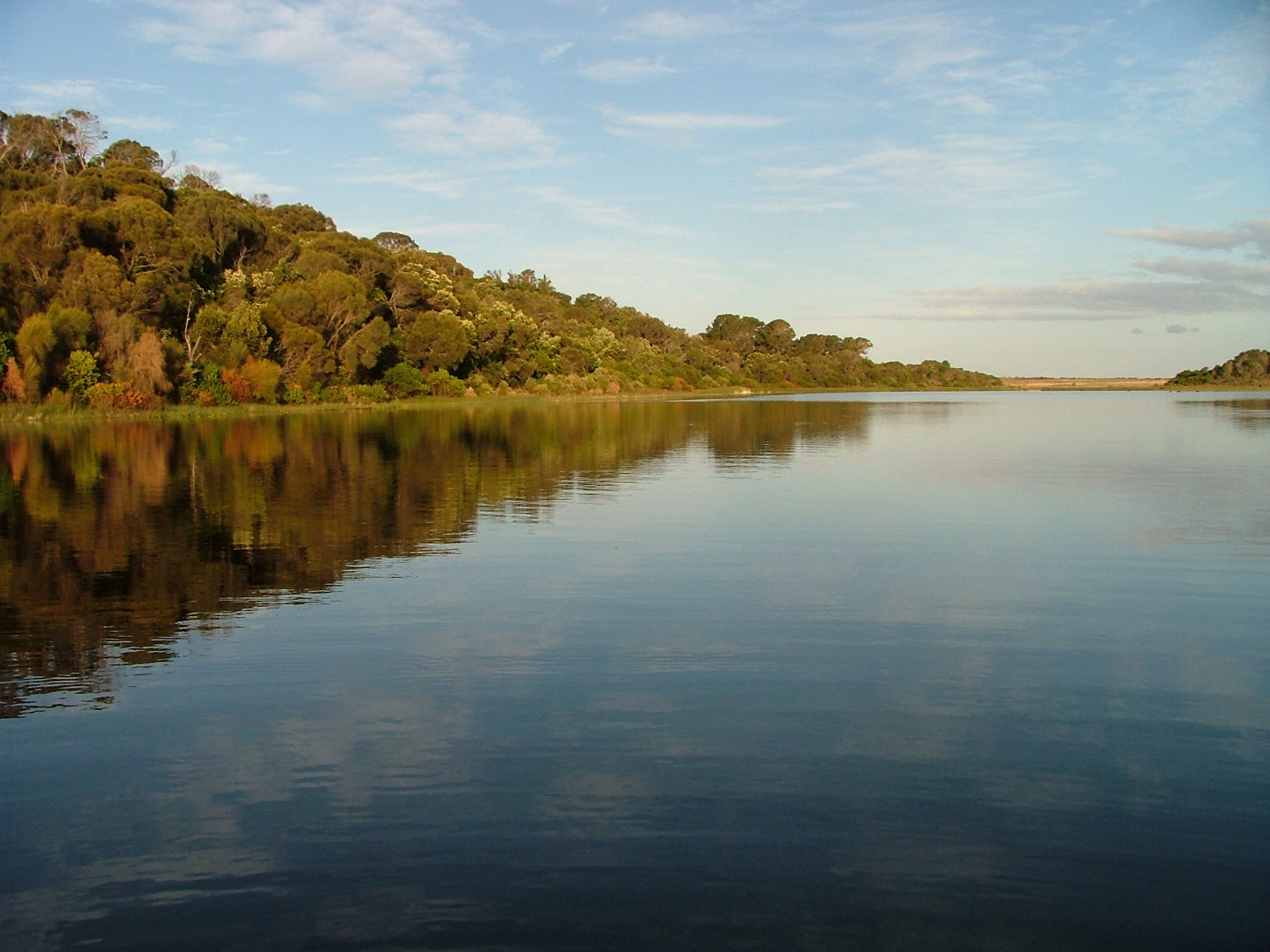
- Little Waterhouse Lagoon

- Location within Tasmania
- Location: North-eastern Tasmania
- Coordinates: 40°52′30″S 147°36′40″E
- Type: Coastal lagoon
- Basin countries: Australia
- Designation: Ramsar Convention (1982)
- Surface area: 10 ha (25 acres)

Ramsar Wetland
- Designated: 16 November 1982
- Reference no.: 260

Little Waterhouse Lake is a freshwater coastal lagoon in the Waterhouse Conservation Area of north-eastern Tasmania, Australia. In 1982 it was designated a wetland of international importance under the Ramsar Convention.

== Description ==
The 56-hectare (140-acre) Ramsar site encompasses Little Waterhouse Lake, its adjacent floodplain to the south, with the marshland extending 400 metres (1,300 ft) downstream of the lake. The 10-hectare (25-acre) lake lies near Bass Strait behind coastal dunes and receives its water from local catchment runoff. It has high floral diversity, with over 40 species of aquatic and semi-aquatic plants. The site also supports the threatened growling grass frog and dwarf galaxias.

== See also ==
- List of reservoirs and dams in Australia § Tasmania
- List of lakes of Australia § Tasmania
