= Ethylin Wang Jabs =

American geneticist

- Citizenship: American
- Education: Johns Hopkins University
- Scientific career
- Fields: medical genetics, craniofacial biology
- Workplaces: Icahn School of Medicine at Mount Sinai

Ethylin Wang Jabs is an American physician and scientist with expertise in medical genetics, pediatrics, and craniofacial biology. She is currently vice chair of the Department of Genetics and Genomic Sciences at the Icahn School of Medicine at Mount Sinai Medical Center. Jabs is also a professor in the departments of developmental and regenerative biology and pediatrics at Mount Sinai and an adjunct professor in pediatrics, medicine, and surgery at the Johns Hopkins School of Medicine. Her research and clinical practice have focused on the development of genetics and patients with birth defects.

== Education ==
Jabs graduated in 1974 as a member of the first undergraduate class that admitted women at Johns Hopkins University. She received her medical degree and pediatric and medical genetics training at Johns Hopkins Hospital and Johns Hopkins Children's Center.

== Research highlights ==
Jabs joined the Johns Hopkins University faculty in 1984 and became a professor of pediatric genetics and Director of the Center for Craniofacial Development and Disorders.

Her laboratory was responsible for the identification of the first human mutation in a homeobox-containing gene, an important regulatory gene in development. Jabs went on to identify mutations in key genes responsible for craniofacial disorders, especially craniosynostosis. She discovered that similar mutations in the same gene, fibroblast growth factor receptor 2 or FGFR2, cause both Jackson–Weiss syndrome and Crouzon syndrome.

For some of these conditions, Jabs demonstrated the association of advanced paternal age at conception. She has studied the increased frequency of spontaneous mutations arising in sperm with aging. Jabs started a database of clinical and genetic data for people with craniofacial disorders including those with Möbius syndrome, a rare neurological disorder, to help identify the genetic root of the condition. Jabs joined the Mount Sinai medical school in 2007. She conducts collaborative genetic research on rare disorders and animal model systems to investigate the molecular mechanism and potential therapeutic strategies for these conditions. She is an active clinician seeing patients with birth defects.

During her time at Johns Hopkins, she directed an international training program in collaboration with Peking Union Medical College and Peking University. At Mount Sinai, she runs a training program for predoctoral students on the integration of bioinformatics, statistics, and developmental biology.

Jabs is an advisor to several parent support groups, including Smile Train. She has authored more than 250 peer-reviewed publications, chapters, and reviews.
