= Lake Zvezda =

Lake in Antarctica

- Location within Antarctica
- Location: Vestfold Hills, Princess Elizabeth Land, Antarctica
- Coordinates: 68°32′S 78°27′E
- Basin countries: Antarctica
- Average depth: 15.4 m (51 ft) above sea level
- Frozen: Yes

Lake Zvezda is a large, irregular-shaped glacial lake 0.5 miles (0.80 km) southeast of Lake Cowan in the east part of Vestfold Hills of Princess Elizabeth Land in Antarctica.

The lake was photographed from the air by U.S. Navy Operation Highjump (1946–47) and was mapped from air photos taken by the Soviet Antarctic Expedition (1956) and ANARE (Australian National Antarctic Research Expeditions) (1957–58). It was named Zvezda (star) by the Soviet expedition, and is not to be confused with Braunsteffer Lake, which is 0.5 miles southwest of Lake Cowan.
