= Lake Vereteno =

- Location within Antarctica
- Location: Breidnes Peninsula, Vestfold Hills, Princess Elizabeth Land, Antarctica
- Coordinates: 68°31′S 78°25′E
- Type: glacial lake
- Max. length: 1.5 nautical miles (2.8 km; 1.7 mi)

Lake Vereteno is a narrow glacial lake, 1.5 nautical miles (2.8 km; 1.7 mi) long, located in the northeast part of Breidnes Peninsula, Vestfold Hills in Princess Elizabeth Land of Antarctica. The lake is approximately 1.5 nautical miles (2.8 km; 1.7 mi) south of Luncke Ridge.

The lake was first photographed by U.S. Navy Operation Highjump (1946–47), and subsequently by ANARE (Australian National Antarctic Research Expeditions) (1954–58), and the Soviet Antarctic Expedition (1956). It was named Ozero Veretenu (Spindle Lake) by the latter.
