= Lake Magenta =

Lake in the Wheatbelt, Western Australia

- Location in Western Australia
- Interactive map of Lake Magenta
- Location: Wheatbelt, Western Australia
- Coordinates: 33°26′28″S 119°11′01″E
- Type: Salt lake
- Primary inflows: Lake Lockhart
- Basin countries: Australia
- Designation: Lake Magenta Nature Reserve
- Max. length: 22 km (14 mi)
- Max. width: 7 km (4.3 mi)
- Surface area: 110 km^{2} (42 sq mi)
- Surface elevation: 390 m (1,280 ft)

Lake Magenta is an ephemeral salt lake in the Wheatbelt area of Western Australia.

The lake is located 55 kilometres (34 mi) north-east of Jerramungup and 62 kilometres (39 mi) east of Pingrup.

The lake is part of the 1,080 km^{2} (420 sq mi) Lake Magenta Nature Reserve as is the bushland to the west of the lake. The area is in relatively pristine condition and contains a rich array of flora and fauna. Water quality and the health of vegetation has begun to decline in the area as salinity of surface runoff has increased and groundwater levels have risen.

Lake Magenta has a wetland area located to the south, and is on the southern end of an 80-kilometre (50 mi) chain of lakes from Lake Biddy in the north, through Lake Stubbs (and the town of Newdegate), Lake Buchan and Lake Lockhart. There are three other lakes nearby to the east: Lake Morris, Lake Royston and Lake Cobham.

The lake is a broad flat-floored valley with long paleo-drainages to the north and more steeply incised drainage lines to the south. The soils in the area are described as siliceous and calcareous loamy soils of minimal development. The rest of the area is composed of hard and sandy alkaline yellow and mottled sands.

== See also ==
- List of lakes of Australia § Western Australia
