= Braunsteffer Lake =

- Location within Antarctica
- Location: Antarctica
- Coordinates: 68°32′S 78°22′E
- Type: glacial lake
- Max. length: 0.5 nautical miles (1 km)
- Surface area: 512 km^{2} (198 sq mi)

Braunsteffer Lake is a glacial lake 0.5 nautical miles (1 km) long located 1 nautical mile (2 km) west of the central part of Lake Zvezda in the Vestfold Hills of Princess Elizabeth Land in Antarctica .

The lake was photographed from the air by U.S. Navy Operation Highjump (1946–47) and was mapped from air photos by the Soviet Antarctic Expedition (1956) and the Australian National Antarctic Research Expeditions (1957–58). It was named by the Antarctic Names Committee of Australia for Claude Braunsteffer (1933 - 2011), a weather observer at Davis Station in 1959, who carried out scientific investigations on lakes in the Vestfold Hills.
