= Club Lake =

Glacial salt-water lake in Antarctica

- Location within Antarctica
- Location: Antarctica
- Coordinates: 68°33′S 78°14′E
- Type: glacial lake and salt lake
- Max. length: 1.5 nautical miles (3 km)

Club Lake is a glacial saltwater lake in the central part of Breidnes Peninsula in the Vestfold Hills of Princess Elizabeth Land in Antarctica.

The lake is 1.5 nautical miles (2.8 km; 1.7 mi) long and its irregular shape resembles a club which is elongated northeast–southwest. It was mapped from air photos taken by U.S. Navy Operation Highjump, 1946–47, and remapped by Australian National Antarctic Research Expeditions (1957–58) who gave the name.

It is next west of Lake Jabs, and it is 1.5 nautical miles (2.8 km; 1.7 mi) northeast of Collerson Lake.
