= Lake Magenta Nature Reserve =

Nature reserve in Western Australia

- IUCN category Ia (strict nature reserve)
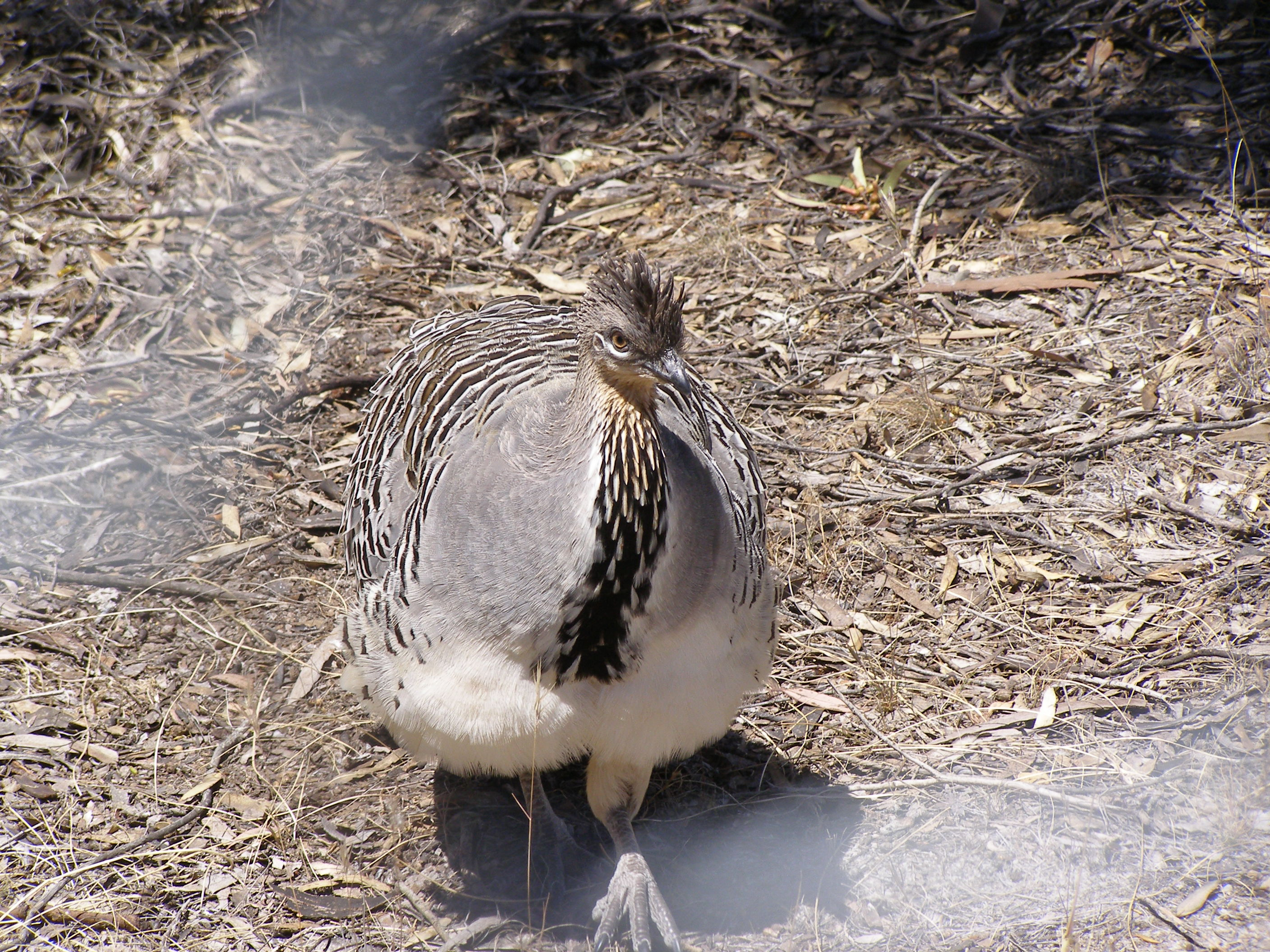
- The reserve is an important area for malleefowl

- Location within Western Australia
- Location: Western Australia
- Nearest city: Pingrup
- Coordinates: 33°33′20″S 119°06′21″E
- Area: 107,902 ha (416.61 sq mi)
- Established: 1958
- Governing body: Department of Biodiversity, Conservation and Attractions

Lake Magenta Nature Reserve is a 1080 km^{2} nature reserve managed by the Department of Parks and Wildlife, making it one of the largest such reserves in the Western Mallee bioregion of Western Australia. It is named after Lake Magenta, which lies just within its eastern boundary.

== Important Bird Area ==
A 1327 km^{2} area of land comprising the reserve (with the exception of Lake Magenta itself), together with a large tract of unallocated crown land to its east, has been identified by BirdLife International as an Important Bird Area (IBA) because it contains core habitat for malleefowl as well as populations of regent parrots, western rosellas, red-capped parrots, blue-breasted fairy-wrens, purple-gaped honeyeaters and western yellow robins - all species restricted to the mallee and south-western biome. The endangered Carnaby's cockatoo occurs in the IBA, though its status there is uncertain.
