= Lake Sylvester System =

Coordinates: 18°49′01″S 135°38′54″E

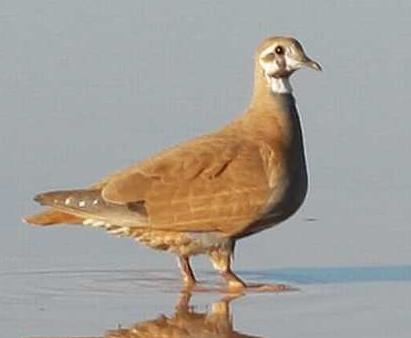
The lake system is important for flock bronzewings

The Lake Sylvester System comprises a system of ephemeral lakes on the Barkly Tableland of the Northern Territory of Australia about 180 km north-east of Tennant Creek.

== Description ==
The whole Sylvester system consists of Lakes de Burgh, Sylvester and Corella, with an unnamed basin to their west, linked by a network of interconnected wetlands. It includes two semi-permanent freshwater billabongs. Corella, de Burgh and Sylvester are ephemeral freshwater lakes which are seasonally inundated, sometimes retaining water for over a year after substantial flooding. At normal capacity the lakes are separate water bodies, though in wetter years they can fill and become connected. During exceptional flood events all water bodies in the system can merge to form a single lake with an area of up to 2000 km^{2}. The lake system lies on deep-cracking grey clay soils that support open shrublands and savanna woodlands with scattered coolibahs, tussock grasslands and mats of aquatic plants. The land forms part of the Brunette Downs pastoral lease operated by the Australian Agricultural Company.

== Birds ==
Some 2262 km^{2} of the lake system and its surroundings have been identified as an Important Bird Area by BirdLife International because it has significant breeding colonies of the letter-winged kites and over 1% of the world populations of plumed whistling-ducks, grey teals, hardheads, little black cormorants, Australian pelicans, straw-necked ibises, Eurasian coots, Oriental plovers, Australian terns and flock bronzewings. It also provides habitat for Australian bustards. When fully inundated, it may support up to a million waterbirds.
