= Sceale Bay Conservation Park =

Protected area in South Australia

- IUCN category III (natural monument or feature)
- Location within South Australia
- Location: South Australia
- Nearest city: Sceale Bay
- Coordinates: 32°56′40″S 134°11′43″E
- Area: 5.27 km^{2} (2.03 sq mi)
- Established: 20 April 1995
- Governing body: Department for Environment and Water

Sceale Bay Conservation Park is a protected area in the Australian state of South Australia located on the west coast of Eyre Peninsula in the gazetted locality of Yanerbie about 6 kilometres (3.7 miles) north of the town of Sceale Bay. The conservation park was proclaimed under the National Parks and Wildlife Act 1972 in 2006 on the basis that some existing crown land 'should be protected and preserved for the purpose of conserving any wildlife and the natural features of the land'. Parts of the conservation park have been subject to protection since 20 April 1995. The conservation park is classified as an IUCN Category III protected area.
