= Richard Maurice (explorer) =

Australian explorer and pastoralist (1859–1906)

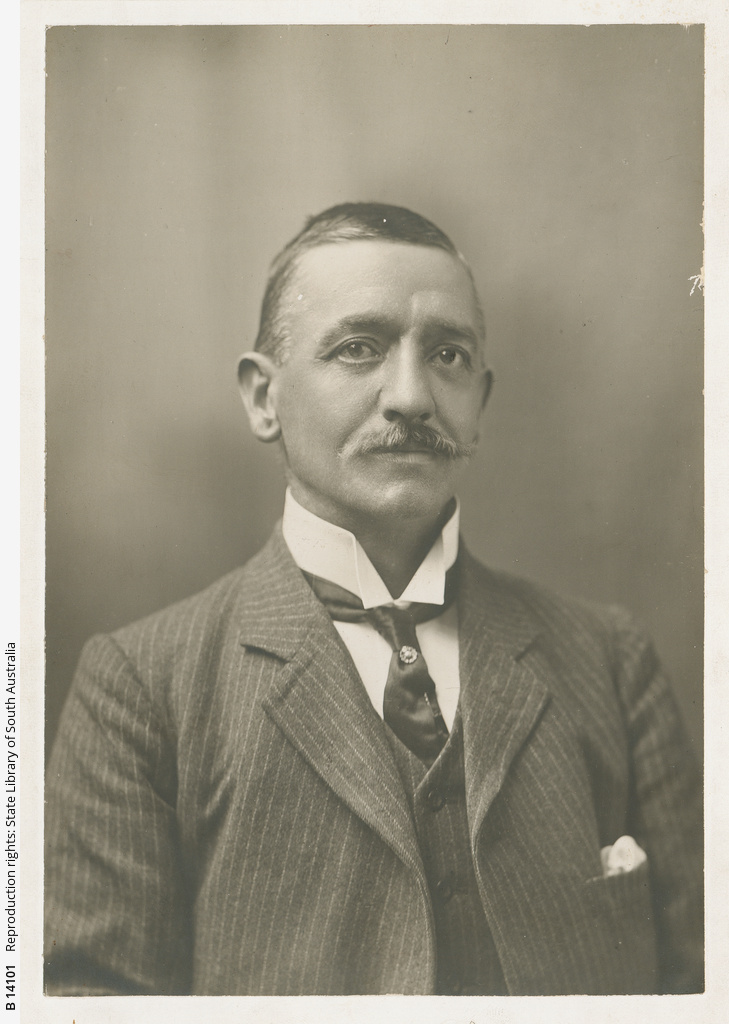
- Richard T. Maurice
- Born: 1859; Fourth Creek, South Australia, Australia
- Died: 24 April 1909 (aged 49–50)
- Occupations: Explorer and Pastoralist

Richard Thelwell Maurice (1859 – 24 April 1909) was an explorer from South Australia who made eight or nine expeditions from his home base of Fowlers Bay, South Australia between 1897 and 1904.

== Early life ==
He was the third son of a prominent pastoralist, Price Maurice, and was born at Fourth Creek in 1859 (a tributary of the Torrens River which runs through Adelaide). At the early age of two or three, his family moved to Bath in England. He attended Somerset College for his education, and in 1876 began farming at Dorset.

He travelled to the United States as a young man to visit some of his father's properties, then spent one year in New Zealand sheep farming. On arrival back in Australia, he spent two years inspecting his father's properties on the west coast, then returned to Fourth Creek.

In his early 20s, Maurice tried his luck in the Kimberley goldfields in the 1880s but serious illness forced his return to Adelaide for a period of convalescence.

Once recovered Richard Thelwell Maurice headed to Fowlers Bay where he found work with George Murray, a personal friend and manager of the nearby Yalata Station. During this period, Maurice established himself as a kangaroo hunter on the Nullarbor Plain.

On his father's death in 1894, Maurice received a substantial inheritance from the estate enabling him to quit Kangaroo-hunting and pursue the exploration of the desert wilderness beyond the northern edge of the Nullarbor Plain.

== Exploration ==
From a new base at Fowlers Bay on the Great Australian Bight, Maurice spent the years 1897 and 1898 searching north of the Nullarbor Plain and the Great Victoria Desert, noting the position of Aboriginal water holes, while maintaining a keen lookout for evidence of gold bearing rocks. In late 1898 he ventured further north to the Everard Ranges collecting Aboriginal artifacts and returned in April the following year.

In 1901 a longer expedition took him to the Rawlinson Ranges in Western Australia to explore the region between the tracks of Ernest Giles in 1875 and the Elder Expedition of 1891–92. He was joined by the government surveyor William Murray whose task was to accurately record water supplies. Other members were William Voake (general hand and cook), Lambert (part Aboriginal cameleer) and his wife. It was during this expedition that Voakes Hill was named.

The year 1902 was the most testing trek for Maurice and his small party, venturing from Fowlers Bay in April, to the distant Wyndham in the north-west of the continent. Personnel on this expedition were R.T. Maurice (leader), W. Murray (surveyor), H. Hausscheldt (cook and general hand), Khasta Khan (Afghan camel handler), Munjena (indigenous assistant to Maurice), plus two trackers, Yarrie and Peter. The party started with 14 camels, but six days after departing Tallaringa, Khan absconded with the best camel. They lost a further six along the way through eating poison bush Gastrolobium. Drought conditions prevailed and lack of water was a constant concern. The route was via Tallaringa to the Everard Ranges, Musgrave Ranges, Ayers Rock (Uluru), Tanami Desert, Sturt Creek, Halls Creek and Wyndham. The expedition mapped waterholes, collected mineral samples and ethnographic specimens. They reached Sturt Creek on 25 August and arrived at Wyndham in October 1902.

Maurice made one final expedition into the country north of Ooldea in 1903 however his arduous life in the bush had left him debilitated and he retired to Sydney later that year.

== Epilogue ==
In 1904 Maurice's journals were published in the South Australian Parliamentary Papers, and numerous specimens were presented to the South Australian museum. In 1909 he was planning another journey from Fowlers Bay, having travelled there a few weeks earlier, but died of heart failure before preparations were complete.
