= Fitzgerald River =

River in Western Australia

Coordinates: 34°05′S 119°38′E

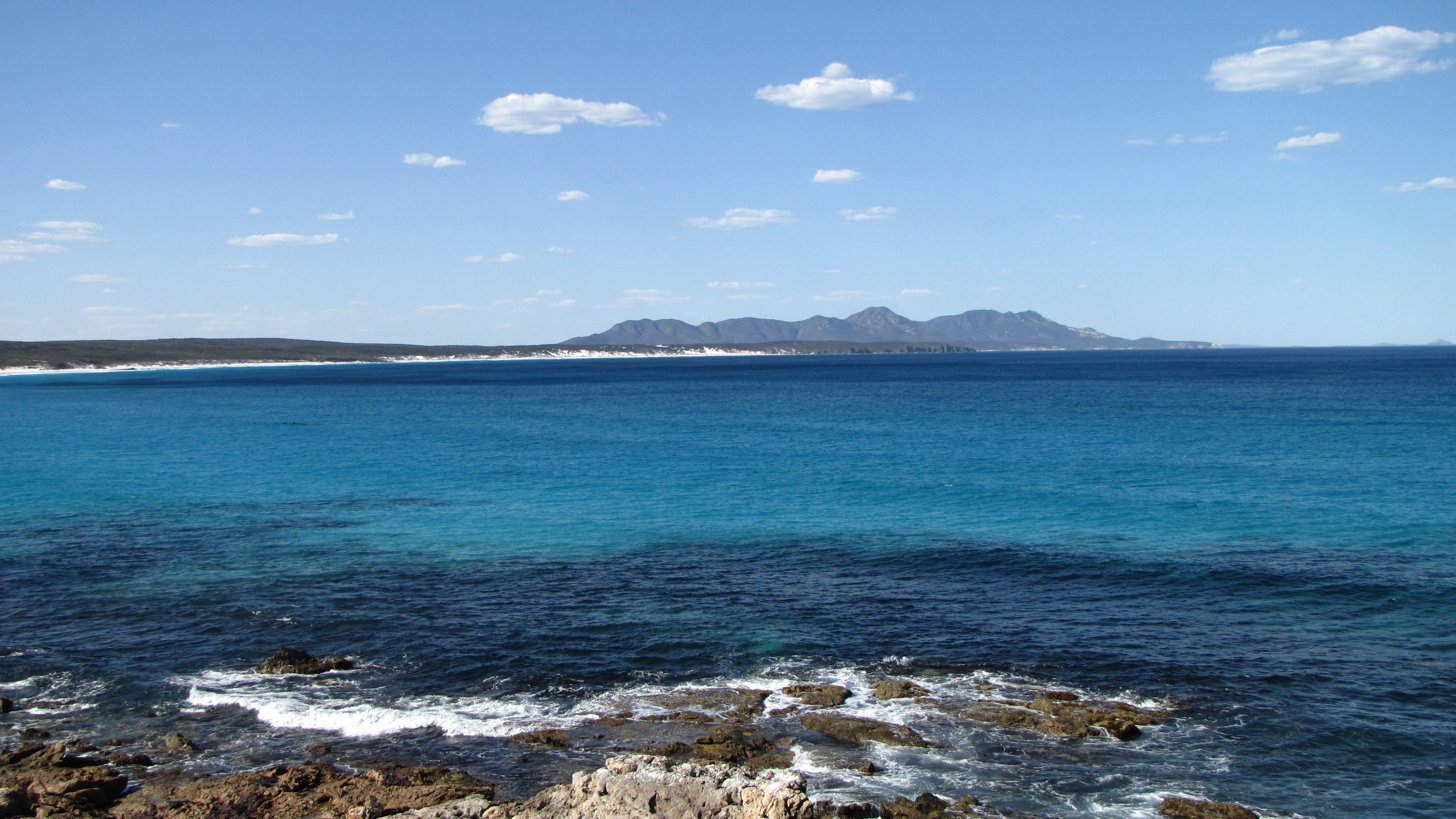

Location
- Country: Australia

Physical characteristics
- Source
  - location: Near Lake Magenta
  - elevation: 324 m (1,063 ft)
- Mouth
  - location: Fitzgerald Inlet
  - elevation: Sea level
- Length: 80 km (50 mi)
- Basin size: 104,000 ha (260,000 acres)
- Discharge
  - average: 7 GL/a (0.22 m^{3}/s; 7.8 cu ft/s)

The Fitzgerald River is a river in the Great Southern region of Western Australia.

Surveyor General John Septimus Roe named the river during expeditions in the area in 1848 after the governor of Western Australia of the day, Charles Fitzgerald.

The river rises near the Lake Magenta Nature Reserve about 300 m above sea level then flows in a southerly direction through farmland until it reaches the Fitzgerald River National Park. The headwaters are in a salt lake area where much of the land has been cleared for agricultural purposes; it is estimated that 40% of the catchment has been cleared. Once the river enters the national park it is flowing through unspoilt bush and has cut magnificent gorges into the plateau of spongolite. Some of the tributaries of the river include Sussetta River, Jacup Creek, Twertup Creek, Tooartup Creek and Martin Creek.

The river discharges into Fitzgerald Inlet which covers a total area of 10.8 km^{2} (4 sq mi), the central basin and barriers have an area of 6.5 km^{2} (3 sq mi) and the delta areas have an area of 3.8 km^{2} (1 sq mi). The inlet, a very shallow estuary, has some fringing vegetation and is wave dominated. The inlet, surrounding marshes and lower portion of the river are a DIWA-listed wetland. The area is a drought refuge for the chestnut teal and is a good example of a naturally saline river with an undisturbed coastal lagoon.

A 1-kilometre (0.62 mi) vegetated sandbar exists between the wetlands and the ocean. The sandbar is breached for a few weeks most years following high rain events.

The river is saline, but was probably saline before land clearing, given that it rises in an area of salt lakes and spongelite would release salts as it is weathered. The river's flow is variable being negligible in dry years, very low under normal conditions but able to flow strongly after substantial rainfall in the area.
