= Electoral results for the district of The Entrance =

Australian district election results

The Entrance, an electoral district of the Legislative Assembly in the Australian state of New South Wales, was created in 1988 as part of a redistribution of seats following the expansion of the Assembly from 99 to 109 seats.

== Members for The Entrance ==
Election	Member	Party
1988	Bob Graham	Liberal
1991	Bob Graham	Liberal
1992 by	Grant McBride	Labor
1995	Grant McBride	Labor
1999	Grant McBride	Labor
2003	Grant McBride	Labor
2007	Grant McBride	Labor
2011	Chris Spence	Liberal
2015	David Mehan	Labor
2019	David Mehan	Labor
2023	David Mehan	Labor

== Election results ==
=== Elections in the 2020s ===
==== 2023 ====
2023 New South Wales state election: The Entrance
Party	Candidate	Votes	%	±%
Labor	David Mehan	22,153	45.0	+1.7
Liberal	Nathan Bracken	17,433	35.4	−2.3
Greens	Ralph Stephenson	4,206	8.6	+0.7
Sustainable Australia	Georgia Lamb	2,131	4.3	+1.9
Animal Justice	Fardin Pelarek	1,896	3.9	−0.2
Liberal Democrats	Bentley Logan	1,372	2.8	+2.8
Total formal votes		49,191	96.7	+1.0
Informal votes		1,688	3.3	−1.0
Turnout		50,879	86.7	−3.2
Two-party-preferred result
Labor	David Mehan	25,782	57.8	+2.5
Liberal	Nathan Bracken	18,793	42.2	−2.5
Labor hold		Swing	+2.5	

=== Elections in the 2010s ===
==== 2019 ====
2019 New South Wales state election: The Entrance
Party	Candidate	Votes	%	±%
Labor	David Mehan	20,744	43.14	+1.26
Liberal	Brian Perrem	18,145	37.73	−6.15
Greens	Stephen Pearson	3,691	7.68	−1.69
Animal Justice	Maddy Richards	2,034	4.23	+4.23
Keep Sydney Open	Jake Fitzpatrick	1,263	2.63	+2.63
Sustainable Australia	Margaret Jones	1,218	2.53	+2.53
Conservatives	Hadden Ervin	991	2.06	+2.06
Total formal votes		48,086	95.76	−0.53
Informal votes		2,130	4.24	+0.53
Turnout		50,216	89.09	−1.37
Two-party-preferred result
Labor	David Mehan	23,661	55.22	+4.84
Liberal	Brian Perrem	19,189	44.78	−4.84
Labor hold		Swing	+4.84	

==== 2015 ====
2015 New South Wales state election: The Entrance
Party	Candidate	Votes	%	±%
Liberal	Michael Sharpe	21,049	43.9	−6.7
Labor	David Mehan	20,086	41.9	+12.0
Greens	Scott Rickard	4,493	9.4	−1.4
Christian Democrats	Hadden Ervin	1,301	2.7	−1.7
No Land Tax	Sonia Lopreiato	1,031	2.1	+2.1
Total formal votes		47,960	96.3	+0.5
Informal votes		1,850	3.7	−0.5
Turnout		49,810	90.5	+0.5
Two-party-preferred result
Labor	David Mehan	22,392	50.4	+12.1
Liberal	Michael Sharpe	22,054	49.6	−12.1
Labor gain from Liberal		Swing	+12.1	

==== 2011 ====
2011 New South Wales state election: The Entrance
Party	Candidate	Votes	%	±%
Liberal	Chris Spence	22,898	50.9	+11.1
Labor	David Mehan	13,057	29.0	−18.5
Greens	Deidrie Jinks	4,877	10.8	+2.0
Christian Democrats	Bob Mirovic	2,083	4.6	+4.6
Family First	James Bond	2,082	4.6	+4.6
Total formal votes		44,997	96.5	−0.9
Informal votes		1,633	3.5	+0.9
Turnout		46,630	93.4	
Two-party-preferred result
Liberal	Chris Spence	24,760	62.5	+17.3
Labor	David Mehan	14,880	37.5	−17.3
Liberal gain from Labor		Swing	+17.3	

=== Elections in the 2000s ===
==== 2007 ====
2007 New South Wales state election: The Entrance
Party	Candidate	Votes	%	±%
Labor	Grant McBride	20,239	47.5	−2.6
Liberal	Phil Walker	16,954	39.8	+6.2
Greens	Kerryn Parry-Jones	3,763	8.8	+3.5
AAFI	Maria Overend	1,663	3.9	+2.5
Total formal votes		42,619	97.4	−0.4
Informal votes		1,122	2.6	+0.4
Turnout		43,741	93.2	
Two-party-preferred result
Labor	Grant McBride	21,762	54.9	−4.8
Liberal	Phil Walker	17,907	45.1	+4.8
Labor hold		Swing	−4.8	

==== 2003 ====
2003 New South Wales state election: The Entrance
Party	Candidate	Votes	%	±%
Labor	Grant McBride	21,763	52.1	+4.8
Liberal	Phil Walker	14,920	35.7	+8.1
Greens	Gwen Parry-Jones	2,362	5.7	+3.4
Christian Democrats	Steve Wood	866	2.1	+0.0
AAFI	Garry Oates	548	1.3	+0.5
Democrats	Carolyn Hastie	496	1.2	−1.6
One Nation	Peter Chermak	465	1.1	−5.8
Save Our Suburbs	Bryan Ellis	327	0.8	+0.8
Total formal votes		41,747	97.8	+0.0
Informal votes		929	2.2	−0.0
Turnout		42,676	92.3	
Two-party-preferred result
Labor	Grant McBride	23,118	59.6	−0.1
Liberal	Phil Walker	15,700	40.4	+0.1
Labor hold		Swing	−0.1	

=== Elections in the 1990s ===
==== 1999 ====
1999 New South Wales state election: The Entrance
Party	Candidate	Votes	%	±%
Labor	Grant McBride	19,526	47.3	−0.3
Liberal	Philip Walker	11,404	27.6	−13.0
National	Bob Graham	3,909	9.5	+9.5
One Nation	John Cantwell	2,861	6.9	+6.9
Democrats	Sarah Browning	1,167	2.8	−0.8
Greens	Rachel Alterator	936	2.3	+2.3
Christian Democrats	Karen Russell	880	2.1	−1.0
AAFI	Garry OAtes	323	0.8	−4.3
Outdoor Recreation	Garth Coulter	271	0.7	+0.7
Total formal votes		41,277	97.8	+1.9
Informal votes		936	2.2	−1.9
Turnout		42,213	94.1	
Two-party-preferred result
Labor	Grant McBride	21,292	59.7	+5.7
Liberal	Philip Walker	14,365	40.3	−5.7
Labor hold		Swing	+5.7	

==== 1995 ====
1995 New South Wales state election: The Entrance
Party	Candidate	Votes	%	±%
Labor	Grant McBride	16,933	47.4	+4.3
Liberal	Doug Eaton	14,369	40.3	−5.9
AAFI	Roy Whaite	1,899	5.3	+5.3
Democrats	Glenice Griffiths	1,340	3.8	−2.1
Call to Australia	Graham Freemantle	1,158	3.2	+3.2
Total formal votes		35,699	96.0	+4.2
Informal votes		1,494	4.0	−4.2
Turnout		37,193	94.0	
Two-party-preferred result
Labor	Grant McBride	18,441	54.1	+4.3
Liberal	Doug Eaton	15,642	45.9	−4.3
Labor gain from Liberal		Swing	+4.3	

==== 1992 by-election ====
1992 The Entrance by-election Saturday 18 January
Party	Candidate	Votes	%	±%
Labor	Grant McBride	16,642	49.6	+6.5
Liberal	Bob Graham	14,222	42.4	−3.7
Democrats	Lynn Sawyer	693	2.1	−3.8
Independent	Peter Clifford	625	1.9	
Independent	Tony Irving	584	1.7	−3.2
Grey Power	Bob Hudson	391	1.2	
Citizens Electoral Council	Sean James	326	0.97	+1.0
Independent	Stewart Scott-Irving	92	0.3	
Total formal votes		33,575	98.4	+1.8
Informal votes		535	1.6	−1.8
Turnout		34,110	91.0	−3.5
Two-party-preferred result
Labor	Grant McBride	17,950	54.7	+4.9
Liberal	Bob Graham	14,857	45.3	−4.9
Labor gain from Liberal		Swing	+4.9	

The Court of Disputed Returns overturned the result of the 1991 The Entrance election.

==== 1991 ====
1991 New South Wales state election: The Entrance
Party	Candidate	Votes	%	±%
Liberal	Bob Graham	14,356	46.1	−5.8
Labor	Grant McBride	13,415	43.1	−3.5
Democrats	Lynn Sawyer	1,825	5.9	+5.3
Independent	Tony Irving	1,516	4.9	+4.9
Total formal votes		31,112	91.7	−5.0
Informal votes		2,801	8.3	+5.0
Turnout		33,913	93.5	
Two-party-preferred result
Liberal	Bob Graham	15,165	50.2	−2.6
Labor	Grant McBride	15,049	49.8	+2.6
Liberal hold		Swing	−2.6	

- This result was overturned by the Court of Disputed Returns and a by-election was called, where Labor won.

=== Elections in the 1980s ===
==== 1988 ====
1988 New South Wales state election: The Entrance
Party	Candidate	Votes	%	±%
Liberal	Bob Graham	16,080	52.0	+21.2
Labor	Brian McGowan	14,852	48.0	−3.7
Total formal votes		30,932	96.7	−1.3
Informal votes		1,069	3.3	+1.3
Turnout		32,001	94.5	
Liberal notional gain from Labor		Swing	+9.9	
