= 1992 The Entrance state by-election =

Election result for The Entrance, New South Wales, Australia

A by-election was held for the New South Wales Legislative Assembly seat of The Entrance on 18 January 1992 because the Court of Disputed Returns overturned the result of the 1991 The Entrance election. Bob Graham (Liberal) had been declared elected by 116 votes over Grant McBride (Labor). Justice Slattery in the Court of Disputed Returns held that more than 200 voters in The Entrance had been given ballot papers for the adjoining district of Gosford and that the poll was void.

== Dates ==
Date	Event
25 May 1991	1991 election
August 1991	petitions against the result of the election lodged by Grant McBride, and Tony Irving.
11 December 1991	Court of Disputed returns declared the election void.
2 January 1992	Writ of election issued by the Speaker of the Legislative Assembly.
3 January 1992	Nominations
18 January 1992	Polling day
7 February 1992	Return of writ

== Results ==
1992 The Entrance by-election Saturday 18 January
Party	Candidate	Votes	%	±%
Labor	Grant McBride	16,642	49.6	+6.5
Liberal	Bob Graham	14,222	42.4	−3.7
Democrats	Lynn Sawyer	693	2.1	−3.8
Independent	Peter Clifford	625	1.9	
Independent	Tony Irving	584	1.7	−3.2
Grey Power	Bob Hudson	391	1.2	
Citizens Electoral Council	Sean James	326	0.97	+1.0
Independent	Stewart Scott-Irving	92	0.3	
Total formal votes		33,575	98.4	+1.8
Informal votes		535	1.6	−1.8
Turnout		34,110	91.0	−3.5
Two-party-preferred result
Labor	Grant McBride	17,950	54.7	+4.9
Liberal	Bob Graham	14,857	45.3	−4.9
Labor gain from Liberal		Swing	+4.9	

== See also ==
- Electoral results for the district of The Entrance
- List of New South Wales state by-elections
