= Terrigal Lagoon =

Lagoon in the state of New South Wales, Australia

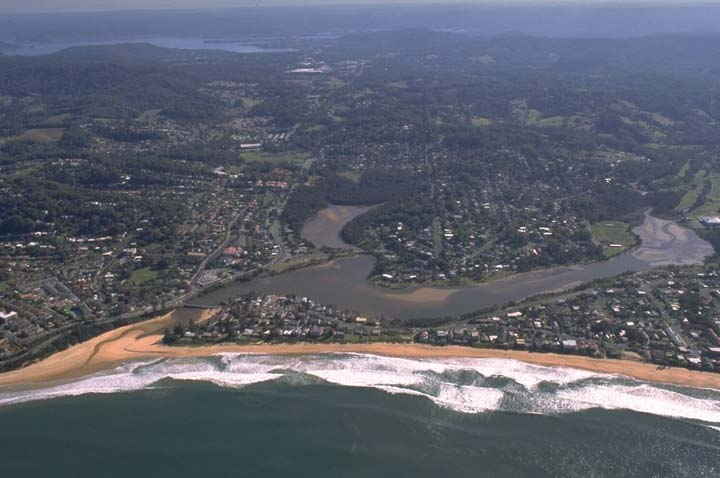

- Location within New South Wales
- Location: Central Coast, New South Wales, Australia
- Coordinates: 33°26′S 151°26′E
- Type: Intermittently closed intermediate saline coastal lagoon
- Primary outflows: Tasman Sea of the South Pacific Ocean
- Catchment area: 8.9 square kilometres (3.4 sq mi)
- Basin countries: Australia
- Surface area: 30 hectares (74 acres)
- Average depth: 0.5 metres (1 ft 8 in)
- Water volume: 151.2 megalitres (5.34×10^{6} cu ft)
- Surface elevation: 0 m (0 ft)
- Settlements: Terrigal, Wamberal

Terrigal Lagoon, an intermittently closed intermediate saline coastal lagoon, is located on the Central Coast of New South Wales, Australia. Terrigal Lagoon is located between the towns of Terrigal and Wamberal, and adjacent to the Pacific Ocean, about 85 kilometres (53 mi) north of Sydney.

== Features and location ==
The lagoon has a surface area of approximately 30 hectares (74 acres) and a catchment area of 8.9 square kilometres (3.4 sq mi). When full, the Terrigal Lagoon covers an area of around 29 hectares (72 acres).

A large part of the upper catchment area of Terrigal Lagoon is rural land, most of which has been cleared. The lower slopes in the vicinity of the lagoon contain extensive urban development. South and west of the lagoon is the township of Terrigal. The northern part of the catchment includes part of the suburb of Wamberal. A large knoll of land rises from the centre of the catchment separating the two arms of the lagoon. The Terrigal Country Club and Golf Course are located at the limit of the North Arm. The North Arm of the creek drains an area of approximately 4.5 square kilometres (1.7 sq mi) and the West Arm 3.7 square kilometres (1.4 sq mi).

Wamberal Lagoon and Avoca Lake located to the north and south respectively, are a short distance away.

== Research of the Terrigal Lagoon ==
From 2005 to 2008 a study, led by Dr. John Marsdale from the University of Newcastle, completed a region-wide survey of waterways. As part of the study, the investigation included the availability of sunlight for plants, turbidity levels, population density of plants and animals residing in the lagoon area, potassium levels, oxygen levels, and water pH levels.

The research team found that abiotic features in the area greatly affected biotic organisms within the lagoon. Marsdale's team also found that the light level available to shrubbery in the lagoon lessened over the course of the study due to growth of taller trees taking critical sunlight from the smaller grounded plants. Marsdale discovered disturbingly high potassium levels in the area in comparison to elsewhere in the region. The potassium levels were affecting not only the fish in the lagoon but also the multitudes of plants that lined the waters edge. The team also found that there was an overall decrease in the distribution of species in the lagoon area particularly concerning animals and some fish species.

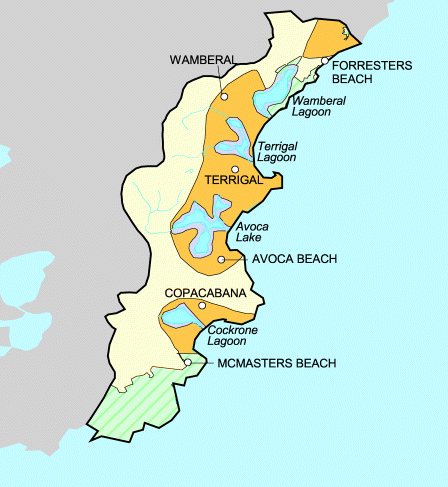
Gosford Lagoons and Sydney Northern Beaches

== See also ==
- List of lakes of Australia
