= Bateau Bay =

- Suburb
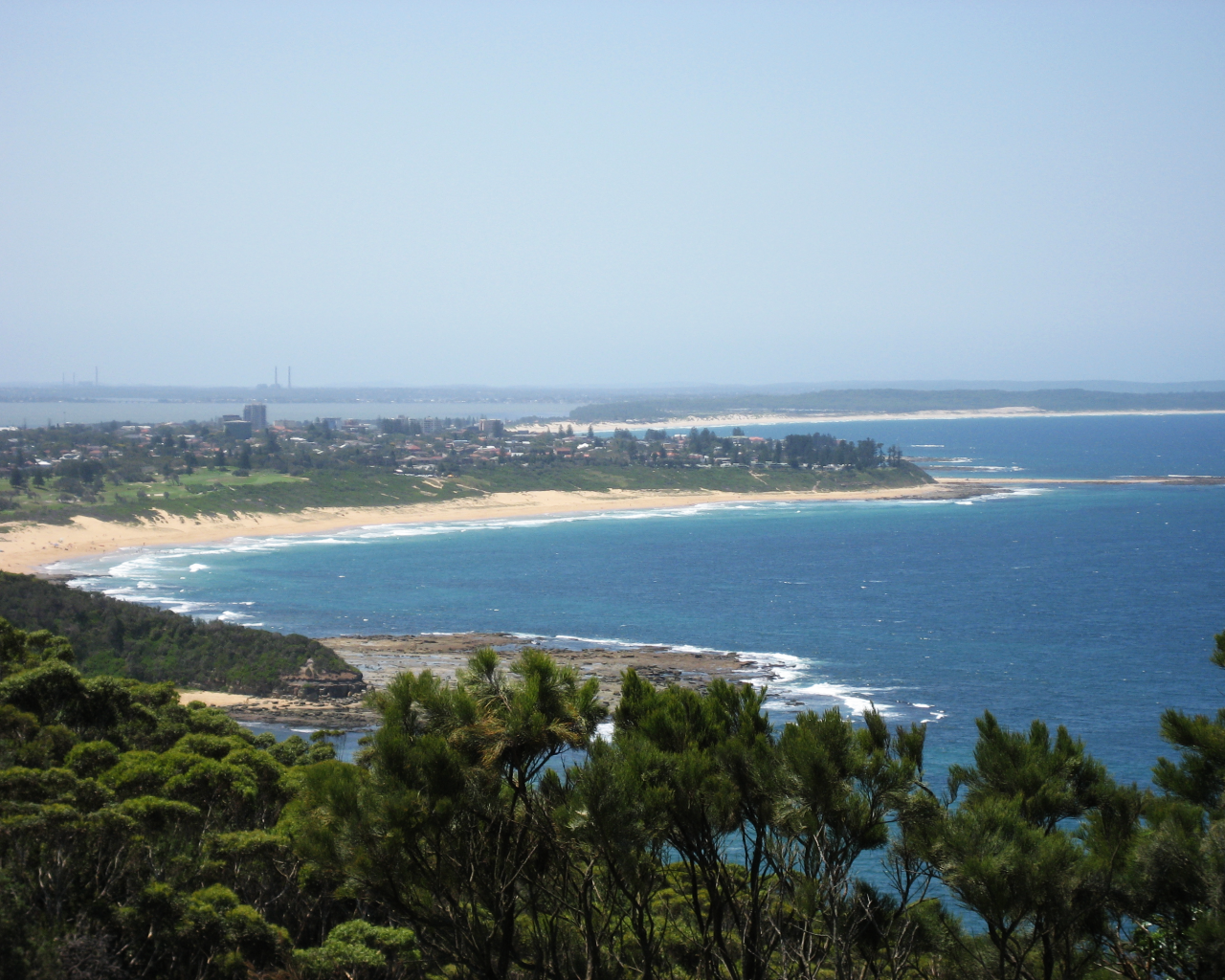
- Crackneck Lookout

- Interactive map of Bateau Bay
- Coordinates: 33.382°S 151.485°E
- Country: Australia
- State: New South Wales
- City: Central Coast
- LGA: Central Coast Council
- Location: 6 km (3.7 mi) SSW of The Entrance; 17 km (11 mi) NE of Gosford; 97 km (60 mi) NNE of Sydney; 69 km (43 mi) SSW of Newcastle

Government
  - State electorate: The Entrance
  - Federal division: Dobell

Area
  - Total: 6.9 km^{2} (2.7 sq mi)
- Elevation: 12 m (39 ft)

Population
  - Total: 12,146 (2016 census)
  - Density: 1,760/km^{2} (4,560/sq mi)
- Postcode: 2261
- Parish: Tuggerah
Suburbs around Bateau Bay
Killarney Vale	Long Jetty	Shelly Beach
Tumbi Umbi	Bateau Bay	Pacific Ocean
Tumbi Umbi	Forresters Beach	Pacific Ocean

Bateau Bay is a suburb of the Central Coast region of New South Wales, Australia. "Bateau" is French for "boat."

== Geography ==
Bateau Bay is about 6 km south of the town of The Entrance and 17 km northeast of Gosford's central business district. Bateau Bay Beach provides access to Crackneck Point, which is a popular local surfing spot. Crackneck Point Lookout (about 100 metres above sea level) is a short distance from the beach, where there is a large clearing and carpark with information boards and a picnic-barbecue area. It provides views of The Entrance peninsula and north across Tuggerah Lakes.

=== Wyrrabalong National Park ===
Part of Bateau Bay is covered by the southern 140 ha section of Wyrrabalong National Park. A feature of the park's coastal cliffs are extensive rock platforms, which are good bases for rock fishing or low tide exploration. Wyrrabalong National Park is a haven for marine, bird, and native wildlife, which include goannas, bandicoots, fantails, and the tawny frogmouth. A 1.6 km walk through Wyrrabalong National Park links Crackneck Point Lookout and Forresters Beach.

== History ==
The settlement was declared a village, under the name "Village of Bateau Bay", by Minister for Lands Ernest Buttenshaw on 13 August 1937. It had previously been called Boat Harbour, and continued to be known as Boat Harbour locally. The name "Boat Harbour" was discontinued by the Geographical Names Board of New South Wales on 29 August 1975.

== Population ==
According to the 2016 census of Population, there were 12,146 people in Bateau Bay.

- Aboriginal and Torres Strait Islander people made up 3.4% of the population.
- 83.1% of people were born in Australia. The most common countries of birth were England 4.3% and New Zealand 1.4%.
- 91.1% of people only spoke English at home.
- The most common responses for religion were Catholic 27.8%, No Religion 26.1% and Anglican 23.6%.

== Sporting facilities and parks ==
EDSACC South Fields

The Entrance District Sporting and Community Centre (EDSACC) is located on The Entrance Road, between Yakalla Street and Eastern Road. The precinct is separated into three areas: EDSACC North Ovals (soccer), EDSACC South Ovals (rugby league), and a Sports Centre that bisects the two. At the very south of the precinct is a golf driving range and a ten-pin bowling centre. EDSACC is home to the Killarney District Soccer Club and The Entrance Tigers Rugby League Club, as well as EDSACC Croquet Club. There are within the suburb fields that allow for playing of rugby league, rugby union, soccer, Australian rules football, softball, baseball, and cricket

EDSACC building has had a number of names in its time and provides tennis courts, indoor basketball courts, and a gymnasium, and was opened in 1979 by the Governor of New South Wales, Sir Roden Cutler.

It was previously the location of The Entrance Airport.

The precinct also has a golf driving range, which was formerly a football field, but was deemed unsafe due to its uneven surface. The home side—The Entrance Bateau Bay Blues—was forced to relocate to a field on Mingara's property at Tumbi Umbi. The Blues have since resettled at Eastern Road Oval in Killarney Vale.

Pat Morley Oval, located on Cresthaven Avenue, was until the early 1980s a rubbish tip and nightsoil depot and was used as a football oval in the 1990s. Development of a new oval adjacent to the existing Pat Morley Oval was completed in 2010, and is used for cricket and Australian rules football. The Entrance Bateau Bay Blues AFL Club will relocate there in 2011. Central Coast Softball will also use the new ground in the summer season. The main ground is home to The Entrance Bateau Bay United Football Club, the oldest soccer club on the Central Coast, having been established in 1952. Sir Joseph Banks Oval, located behind Cresthaven Shopping Centre, is used by The Entrance Rams Rugby Union club.

== Shopping ==
Stockland Bay Village

Bateau Bay Square (formerly known as Stockland Bay Village and Bay Village) is a shopping centre which was opened on the 28th of August 1984, a week after the original planned scheduled opening of August 21st, and is operated by Charter Hall. It is mainly tenanted with chain stores and offers few independent retailers. This piece of land is a new addition to the boundary of Bateau Bay — prior to construction, it was included in the boundary of Killarney Vale. It is located next to a Central Coast Shire Council works depot. The centre has removed many retailers and financial services from the existing local areas, creating a questionable positive impact on local shopping. The centre is surrounded by carparks with a limited number of pedestrian access routes.

A smaller centre, Cresthaven Shopping Centre, opened in 2003. Several other clusters of shops are located throughout Bateau Bay.

== Clubs ==
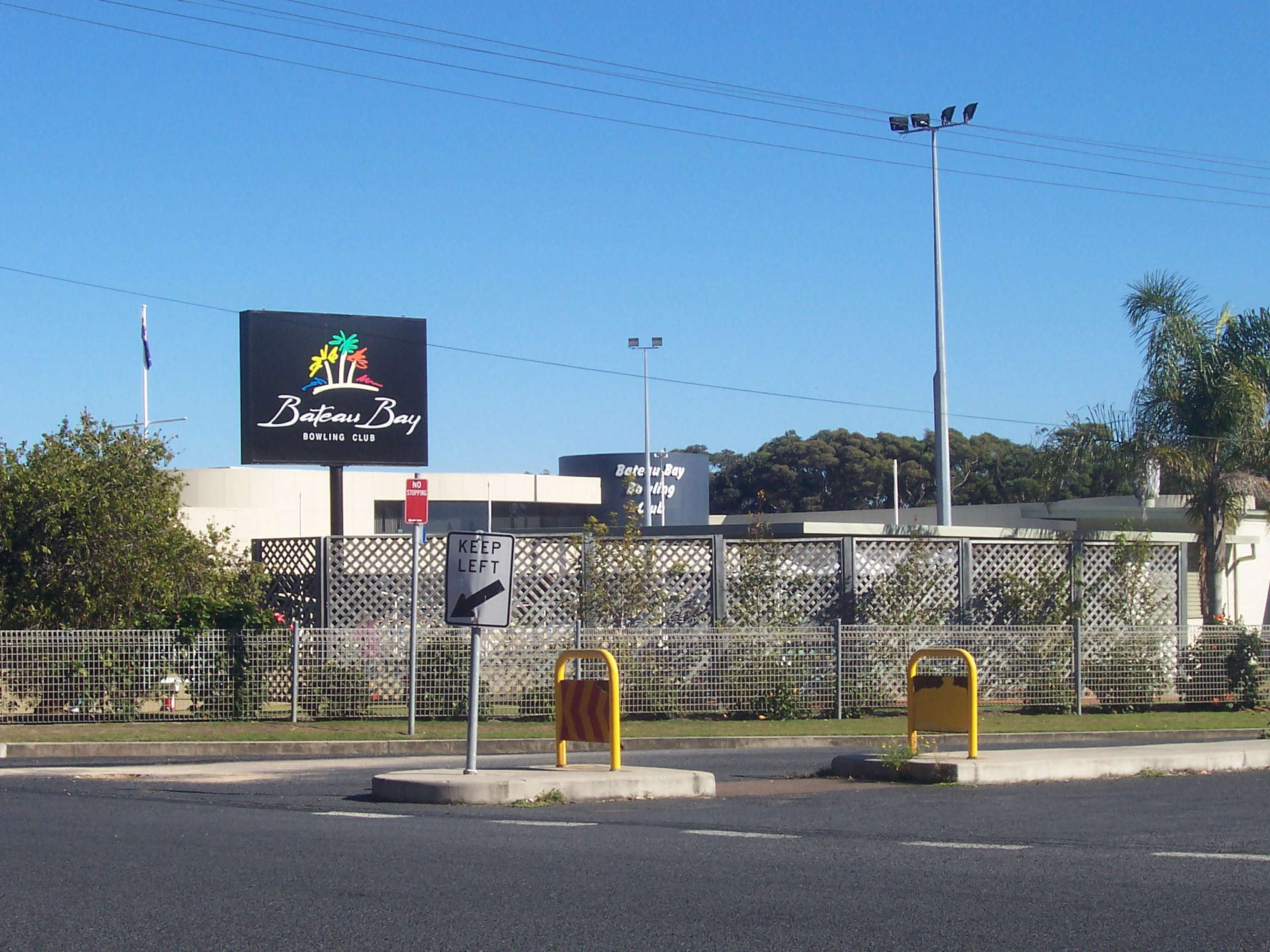
Bateau Bay Bowling Club

Bateau Bay Bowling Club is located on the corner of Pheasant Avenue and Bias Avenue. It has TAB facilities, a bar, and a bistro, as well as an undercover carpark. The club has three bowling greens is strong in competitions run statewide.

The Entrance Leagues Club is located on The Entrance Road adjacent to Bateau Bay Square. The club was first opened in 1992. It has over 15,000 members. It features a large carpark as well as an auditorium, TAB facilities, bar and bistro, function rooms, and a members courtesy bus. The Entrance Leagues Club is a major sponsor of The Entrance Tigers Rugby League Club.

== Notable citizens ==
- Ryan O'Hara (born 1980) formerly played for The Entrance Tigers. He has played in the National Rugby League (NRL) with the Canberra Raiders and Wests Tigers. He currently plays for the Jacksonville Axemen.
- Joseph Furst (born in Vienna, Austria, 1916; died in Bateau Bay, 2005) was an international film and television actor known for his English language roles. He appeared as Professor Zaroff in the Doctor Who story The Underwater Menace. He also had recurring roles in The Young Doctors and four episodes of A Country Practice.
- Adam Harvey, an Australian country music singer, lives in Bateau Bay.
- Teigan Van Roosmalen, an Australian Paralympian.

== Schools ==
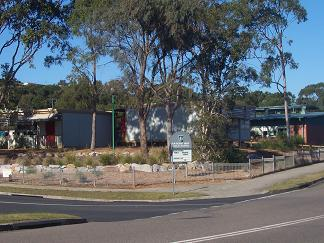
Bateau Bay Public School

There is one school in Bateau Bay: Bateau Bay Public School was established in 1980 and has an enrolment of 620 students in Kindergarten to Year 6. It was originally located in Brooke Avenue (within Killarney Vale) in demountable buildings before relocating. A school remained at Brooke Avenue due to housing development in the period of planning and construction.

== Issues ==
The suburb is bisected by the Entrance Road, a main Central Coast arterial route. There is no differentiation on either side of the Entrance Road; both areas contain housing stock built in the 1960s, '70s, and '80s.

Bateau Bay sewerage treatment plant was built in the late 1960s when at the time there was very little nearby development. Treated sewage is discharged into the sea off Bateau Bay at Wonga Point. Some people protest that sewage may end up on the nearby beaches. Although there has been no major sea pollution from the plant, there is a smell though over the eastern side of the suburb. The treatment plant has operated for longer than most people have been resident.

== Transportation ==
Red Bus CDC NSW bus on The Entrance Road

Red Bus CDC NSW is the local bus operator and runs several routes through Bateau Bay. The operator's depot is also located at Bateau Bay on Coleridge Road.
