= Avoca Lake =

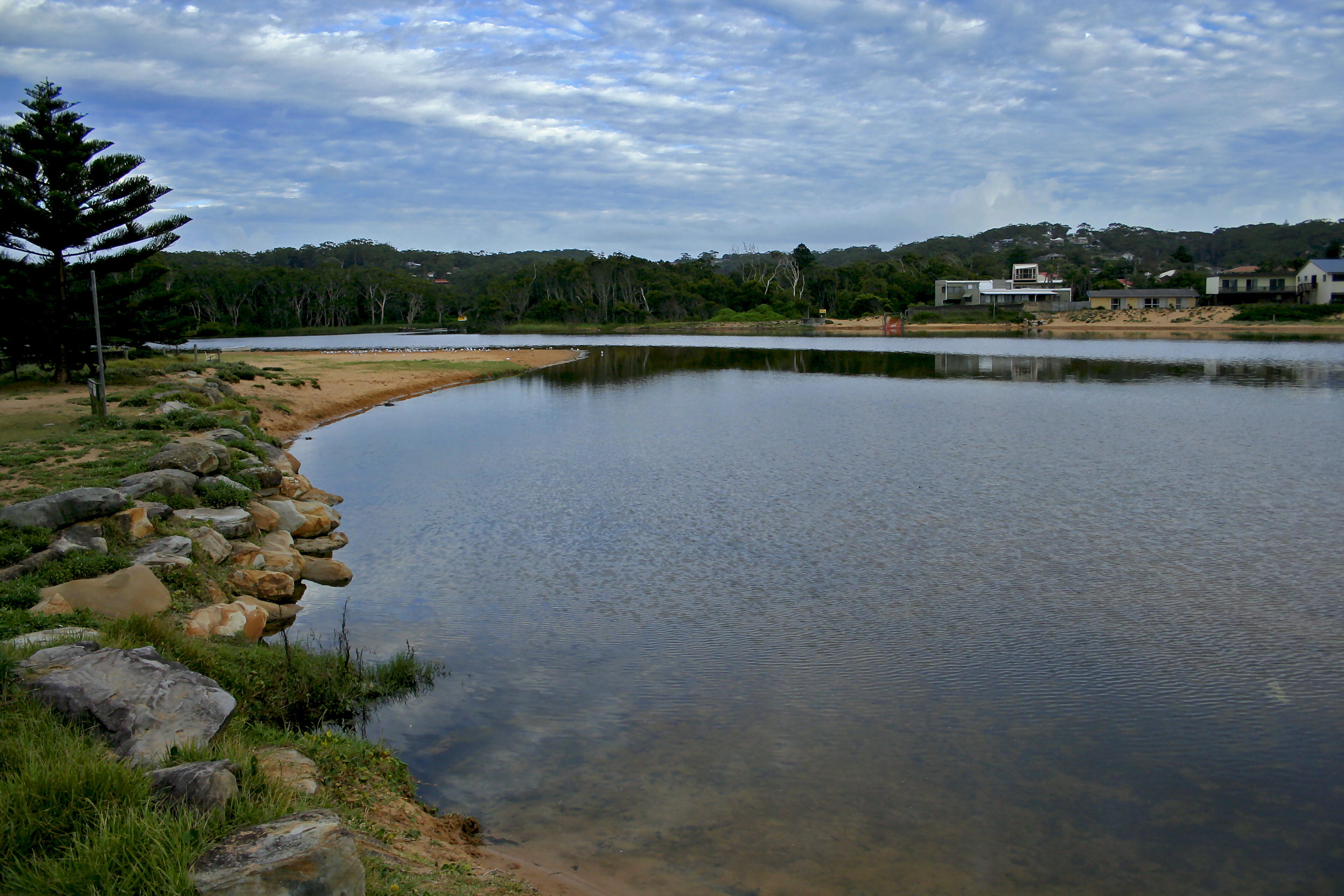
- Avoca Lake

- Location in New South Wales
- Location: Central Coast, New South Wales, Australia
- Coordinates: 33°28′03″S 151°25′39″E
- Lake type: Intermittently closed youthful saline coastal lagoon
- Part of: Central Coast catchment
- Primary outflows: Tasman Sea of the South Pacific Ocean
- Catchment area: 10.8 km^{2} (4.2 sq mi)
- Basin countries: Australia
- Surface area: 70 ha (170 acres)
- Average depth: 0.4 m (1 ft 4 in) AHD
- Water volume: 293.2 ML (10.35×10^{6} cu ft)
- Surface elevation: 0 m (0 ft)
- Islands: Bareena Island
- Settlements: North Avoca, Avoca Beach

The Avoca Lake, formerly known as Avoca Lagoon and as Bulbararing Lagoon, is an intermittently closed intermediate saline coastal lagoon that is located on the Central Coast of New South Wales, Australia. Avoca Lake is located between the beachside settlements of North Avoca and Avoca Beach, and adjacent to the Pacific Ocean, about 85 kilometres (53 mi) north of Sydney.

== Features and location ==
The Avoca Lake is fed by stormwater runoff into Saltwater Creek that gathers on the slopes within Kincumber Mountain Reserve to the northwest above Pickets Valley. The lake has a surface area of approximately 70 hectares (170 acres) and a catchment area of 10.8 square kilometres (4.2 sq mi). Its outflow is into Bulbararing Bay in the Tasman Sea of the South Pacific Ocean. The outflow is generally closed, and water levels inside the lake are not usually influenced by ocean tides.

Bareena Island lies entirely within Avoca Lake.

Terrigal Lagoon and Wamberal Lagoon are located to the north and are a short distance away.

== See also ==
- List of lakes of Australia
