= Wamberal Lagoon =

Lake in the state of New South Wales, Australia

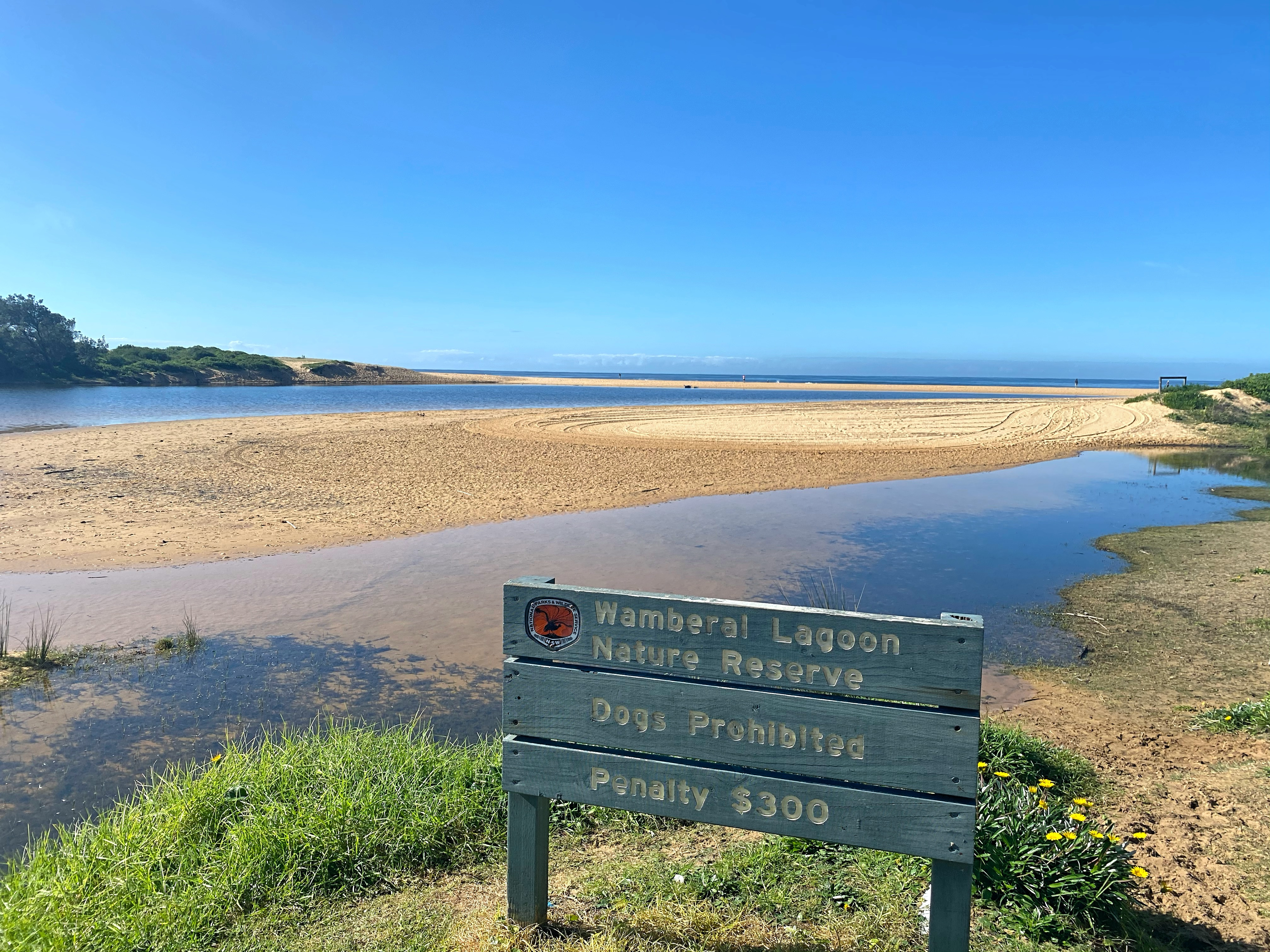

- Location within New South Wales Location within Australia
- Location: Central Coast, New South Wales, Australia
- Coordinates: 33°26′S 151°27′E
- Type: Intermittently closed intermediate saline coastal lagoon
- Primary inflows: Forresters Creek
- Primary outflows: Tasman Sea of the South Pacific Ocean
- Catchment area: 5.8 square kilometres (2.2 sq mi)
- Basin countries: Australia
- Surface area: 50 hectares (120 acres)
- Average depth: 1.7 metres (5 ft 7 in) (AHD)
- Water volume: 880.2 megalitres (31.08×10^{6} cu ft)
- Surface elevation: 0 m (0 ft)
- Settlements: Forresters Beach, Wamberal

Wamberal Lagoon, an intermittently closed intermediate saline coastal lagoon, is located on the Central Coast region of New South Wales, Australia. Wamberal Lagoon is located between the beachside settlements of Forresters Beach and Wamberal, and adjacent to the Pacific Ocean, about 87 kilometres (54 mi) north of Sydney.

== Features and location ==
Fed by stormwater runoff that flows into Forresters Creek, the lagoon has a surface area of approximately 50 hectares (120 acres) and a catchment area of 5.8 square kilometres (2.2 sq mi). When full, the Wamberal Lagoon covers an area of around 50 hectares (120 acres). Its outflow is to the Tasman Sea of the South Pacific Ocean that is generally closed, and water levels inside the lagoon are not usually influenced by ocean tides.

The lagoon and the surrounding land comprising 139 hectares (340 acres) form part of the Wamberal Lagoon Nature Reserve, a nature reserve created in 1981, that is under management of the NSW National Parks & Wildlife Service.

Terrigal Lagoon and Avoca Lake are located to the south and are a short distance away.

== Wamberal Lagoon Conservation Society ==
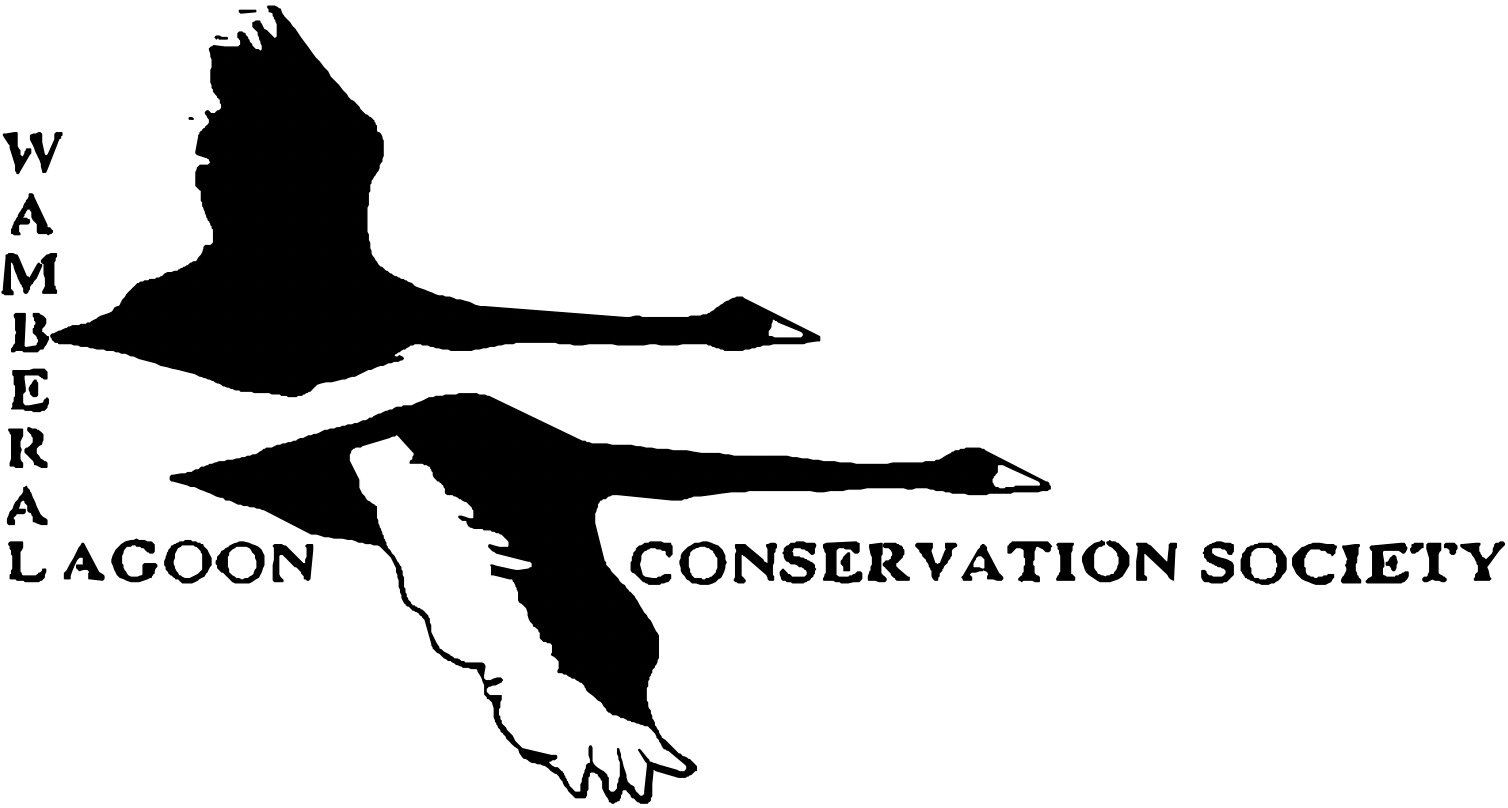

Formed in 1983 and still active, the Wamberal Lagoon Conservation Society (WLCS) was set up to promote conservation of the lagoon and its surrounds in the face of increasing urban development.

The initial charter of the WLCS cited the terms of Section 49(3) of the National Parks and Wildlife Act: lands within a nature reserve shall be deemed to be dedicated for the purposes of:

- (a) The care, propagation, preservation and conservation of wildlife;
- (b) The care, preservation and conservation of natural environments and natural phenomena.
- (c) The study of wildlife, natural environments and natural phenomena; and
- (d) The promotion of the appreciation and enjoyment of wildlife, natural environments and natural phenomena.

To this end the Society engages in education, co-operation with other bodies having a similar interest, and representations to authorities whose responsibilities affect the nature reserve. Members of the WLCS have been active members in bushcare activities over many years, involving removal of rubbish and invasive plants from environmentally sensitive areas, and replanting of native vegetation.

In 2018 and 2019 the WLCS initiated a habitat restoration project aimed at improving water quality in inflows to the lagoon, with the ultimate aim of reintroducing an endangered amphibian species (the green and golden bell frog, Litoria aurea) that once was common in this area but has been extirpated (as it has over most of its former range).

The green and goldenbell frog, Litoria aurea, was once abundant on the Central Coast of NSW but is now known from only two small populations, at Avoca Lagoon and Davistown. The species is classed as endangered under both federal and state wildlife regulations. Photograph by Matt Greenlees.

The WLCS is working with management authorities (notably, the NSW National Parks & Wildlife Service and the Central Coast Council) to identify practicable methods to reduce pollutant input (e.g., via Gross Pollutant Traps on waterways flowing into the lagoon) and to replace invasive weeds with native vegetation to enhance biodiversity.

As part of the habitat restoration initiative, WLCS assembled a list of vertebrate species that have been recorded to occur within one kilometre of the lagoon, based on unpublished records by WLCS members as well as consultancy reports. That list confirms the highly biodiverse nature of the site, and hence the importance of its conservation. Species lists below.

=== Amphibians ===
Family	Common name	Species
Hylidae	Bleating tree frog	Litoria dentata
Hylidae	Eastern dwarf tree frog	Litoria fallax
Hylidae	Peron's tree frog	Litoria peronii
Myobatrachidae	Tusked frog	Adelotus brevis
Myobatrachidae	Common eastern froglet	Crinia signifera
Myobatrachidae	Striped marsh frog	Limnodynastes peronii

=== Birds ===
Family	Common name	Species
Acanthizidae	Brown thornbill	Acanthiza pusilla
Acanthizidae	Striated thornbill	Acanthiza lineata
Acanthizidae	Yellow thornbill	Acanthiza nana
Acanthizidae	Brown gerygone	Gerygone mouki
Acanthizidae	White-browed scrubwren	Sericornis frontalis
Accipitridae	Grey Goshawk	Accipiter (Leucospiza) novaehollandiae
Accipitridae	Pacific Baza	Aviceda (Aviceda) subcristata
Accipitridae	White-bellied sea eagle	Haliaeetus leucogaster
Accipitridae	Whistling Kite	Haliastur sphenurus
Accipitridae	Black Kite	Milvus migrans
Accipitridae	Osprey	Pandion haliaetus
ACROCEPHALIDAE	Australian Reed Warbler	Acrocephalus (Acrocephalus) australis
ALCEDINIDAE	Kookaburra	Dacelo (Dacelo) novaeguineae
ALCEDINIDAE	Sacred Kingfisher	Todiramphus (Todiramphus) sanctus
ANATIDAE	Mallard Duck	Anas (Anas) platyrhynchos
ANATIDAE	Pacific Black Duck	Anas (Anas) superciliosa
ANATIDAE	Chestnut Teal	Anas (Nettion) castanea
ANATIDAE	Grey Teal	Anas (Nettion) gracilis
ANATIDAE	Hardhead	Aythya (Nyroca) australis
ANATIDAE	Musk Duck	Biziura lobata
ANATIDAE	Australian Wood Duck	Chenonetta jubata
ANATIDAE	Black Swan	Cygnus (Chenopis) atratus
ANHINGIDAE	Australasian Darter	Anhinga novaehollandiae
APODIDAE	Spine-Tailed Swift	Hirundapus caudacutus
ARDEIDAE	Eastern Great Egret	Ardea (Casmerodius) modesta
ARDEIDAE	Eastern Great Egret	Ardea (Casmerodius) modesta
ARDEIDAE	Intermediate Egret	Ardea (Mesophoyx) intermedia
ARDEIDAE	Great Egret	Ardea alba
ARDEIDAE	Striated Heron	Butorides striatus
ARDEIDAE	Little Egret	Egretta garzetta
ARDEIDAE	White-Faced Heron	Egretta novaehollandiae
ARDEIDAE	Eastern Reef Egret	Egretta sacra
ARDEIDAE	Black Bittern	Ixobrychus flavicollis
ARDEIDAE	Nankeen Night-Heron	Nycticorax caledonicus
ARTAMIDAE	White-Breasted Woodswallow	Artamus (Artamus) leucorynchus
ARTAMIDAE	Pied Butcherbird	Cracticus nigrogularis
ARTAMIDAE	Australian Magpie	Cracticus tibicen
ARTAMIDAE	Grey Butcherbird	Cracticus torquatus
ARTAMIDAE	Pied Currawong	Strepera (Strepera) graculina
CACATUIDAE	Sulphur-Crested Cockatoo	Cacatua (Cacatua) galerita
CACATUIDAE	Little Corella	Cacatua (Licmetis) sanguinea
CACATUIDAE	Long-Billed Corella	Cacatua (Licmetis) tenuirostris
CACATUIDAE	Gang-Gang Cockatoo	Callocephalon fimbriatum
CACATUIDAE	Yellow-Tailed Black-Cockatoo	Calyptorhynchus (Zanda) funereus
CACATUIDAE	Galah	Eolophus roseicapillus
CAMPEPHAGIDAE	Black-Faced Cuckoo-Shrike	Coracina (Coracina) novaehollandiae
CENTROPODIDAE	Pheasant Coucal	Centropus (Polophilus) phasianinus
CHARADRIIDAE	Pacific Golden Plover	Pluvialis fulva
CHARADRIIDAE	Masked Lapwing	Vanellus miles
CICONIIDAE	Black-Necked Stork	Ephippiorhynchus (Ephippiorhynchus) asiaticus
COLUMBIDAE	Rock Pigeon	Columba (Columba) livia
COLUMBIDAE	White-Headed Pigeon	Columba (Janthoenas) leucomela
COLUMBIDAE	Bar-Shouldered Dove	Geopelia humeralis
COLUMBIDAE	Crested Pigeon	Ocyphaps lophotes
COLUMBIDAE	Common Bronzewing	Phaps (Phaps) chalcoptera
COLUMBIDAE	Spotted Dove	Streptopelia (Spilopelia) chinensis
CORACIIDAE	Dollarbird	Eurystomus orientalis
CORCORACIDAE	White-Winged Chough	Corcorax melanorhamphos
CORVIDAE	Australian Raven	Corvus coronoides
CUCULIDAE	Fan-Tailed Cuckoo	Cacomantis (Vidgenia) flabelliformis
CUCULIDAE	Pacific Koel	Eudynamys orientalis
CUCULIDAE	Channel-Billed Cuckoo	Scythrops novaehollandiae
DICRURIDAE	Spangled Drongo	Dicrurus bracteatus
ESTRILDIDAE	Red-Browed Finch	Neochmia (Aegintha) temporalis
FALCONIDAE	Nankeen Kestrel	Falco (Tinnunculus) cenchroides
HIRUNDINIDAE	Welcome Swallow	Hirundo neoxena
LARIDAE	Whiskered Tern	Chlidonias (Pelodes) hybrida
LARIDAE	Silver Gull	Chroicocephalus novaehollandiae
LARIDAE	Sooty Tern	Sterna fuscata
LARIDAE	Common Tern	Sterna hirundo
LARIDAE	White-fronted Tern	Sterna striata
LARIDAE	Crested Tern	Thalasseus bergii
MALURIDAE	Variegated Fairy-Wren	Malurus (Leggeornis) lamberti
MALURIDAE	Superb Fairy-Wren	Malurus (Malurus) cyaneus
MEGAPODIIDAE	Australian Brush-Turkey	Alectura lathami
MELIPHAGIDAE	Eastern Spinebill	Acanthorhynchus tenuirostris
MELIPHAGIDAE	Little Wattlebird	Anthochaera (Anellobia) chrysoptera
MELIPHAGIDAE	Red Wattlebird	Anthochaera carunculata
MELIPHAGIDAE	Yellow-Faced Honeyeater	Caligavis chrysops
MELIPHAGIDAE	Bell Miner	Manorina (Manorina) melanophrys
MELIPHAGIDAE	Noisy Miner	Manorina (Myzantha) melanocephala
MELIPHAGIDAE	Lewin's Honeyeater	Meliphaga (Meliphaga) lewinii
MELIPHAGIDAE	White-Naped Honeyeater	Melithreptus (Melithreptus) lunatus
MELIPHAGIDAE	White-Cheeked Honeyeater	Phylidonyris (Meliornis) niger
MELIPHAGIDAE	New Holland Honeyeater	Phylidonyris (Meliornis) novaehollandiae
MONARCHIDAE	Magpie-Lark	Grallina cyanoleuca
NECTARINIIDAE	Mistletoebird	Dicaeum (Dicaeum) hirundinaceum
OCEANITIDAE	White-Faced Storm-Petrel	Pelagodroma marina
ORIOLIDAE	Olive-Backed Oriole	Oriolus (Mimeta) sagittatus
ORIOLIDAE	Australasian Figbird	Sphecotheres vieilloti
PACHYCEPHALIDAE	Grey Shrike-Thrush	Colluricincla (Colluricincla) harmonica
PACHYCEPHALIDAE	Golden Whistler	Pachycephala (Pachycephala) pectoralis
PARDALOTIDAE	Spotted Pardalote	Pardalotus (Pardalotus) punctatus
PELECANIDAE	Australian pelican	Pelecanus conspicillatus
PETROICIDAE	Eastern Yellow Robin	Eopsaltria (Eopsaltria) australis
PHAETHONTIDAE	Red-Tailed Tropicbird	Phaethon rubricauda
PHALACROCORACIDAE	Little Black Cormorant	Phalacrocorax sulcirostris
PHALACROCORACIDAE	Pied Cormorant	Phalacrocorax varius
PHALACROCORACIDAE	Great Cormorant	Phalacrocrorax carbo
PODARGIDAE	Tawny Frogmouth	Podargus strigoides
PODICIPEDIDAE	Australasian Grebe	Tachybaptus novaehollandiae
PROCELLARIIDAE	Sooty Shearwater	Ardenna grisea
PROCELLARIIDAE	Wedge-tailed Shearwater	Ardenna pacificus
PROCELLARIIDAE	Short-tailed Shearwater	Ardenna tenuirostris
PROCELLARIIDAE	Fairy Prion	Pachyptila turtur
PROCELLARIIDAE	Great-Winged Petrel	Pterodroma (Pterodroma) macroptera
PROCELLARIIDAE	Little Shearwater	Puffinus (Puffinus) assimilis
PSITTACIDAE	Australian King-Parrot	Alisterus scapularis
PSITTACIDAE	Musk Lorikeet	Glossopsitta concinna
PSITTACIDAE	Little Lorikeet	Parvipsitta pusilla
PSITTACIDAE	Eastern Rosella	Platycercus (Violania) eximius
PSITTACIDAE	Crimson Rosella	Platycercus elegans
PSITTACIDAE	Scaly-Breasted Lorikeet	Trichoglossus chlorolepidotus
PSITTACIDAE	Rainbow Lorikeet	Trichoglossus haematodus
PSOPHODIDAE	Eastern Whipbird	Psophodes (Psophodes) olivaceus
PTILONORHYNCHIDAE	Satin Bowerbird	Ptilonorhynchus violaceus
PYCNONOTIDAE	Red-Whiskered Bulbul	Pycnonotus (Pycnonotus) jocosus
RALLIDAE	Eurasian Coot	Fulica atra
RALLIDAE	Dusky Moorhen	Gallinula (Gallinula) tenebrosa
RALLIDAE	Banded Rail	Gallirallus philippensis
RALLIDAE	Purple Swamphen	Porphyrio (Porphyrio) porphyrio
RHIPIDURIDAE	Rufous Fantail	Rhipidura (Howeavis) rufifrons
RHIPIDURIDAE	Grey Fantail	Rhipidura (Rhipidura) albiscapa
RHIPIDURIDAE	Willie Wagtail	Rhipidura (Sauloprocta) leucophrys
SCOLOPACIDAE	Red-necked Stint	Calidris ruficollis
SCOLOPACIDAE	Curew Sandpiper	Callidris ferruginea
SCOLOPACIDAE	Latham's Snipe	Gallinago hardwickii
SCOLOPACIDAE	Bar-Tailed Godwit	Limosa lapponica
SPHENISCIDAE	Little Penguin	Eudyptula minor
STERCORARIIDAE	Arctic Jaeger	Stercorarius parasiticus
STRIGIDAE	Southern Boobook	Ninox (Ninox) novaeseelandiae
STRIGIDAE	Powerful Owl	Ninox (Rhabdoglaux) strenua
STURNIDAE	Common Myna	Acridotheres tristis
STURNIDAE	Common Starling	Sturnus (Sturnus) vulgaris
SULIDAE	Australasian Gannet	Morus serrator
THRESKIORNITHIDAE	Royal Spoonbill	Oplatalea regia
THRESKIORNITHIDAE	Australian White Ibis	Threskiornis molucca
TIMALIIDAE	Silvereye	Zosterops lateralis
TYTONIDAE	Eastern Barn Owl	Tyto (Tyto) javanica

=== Fish ===
Family	Species	Common name
AMBASSIDAE	Ambassus jacksoniensis	Port Jackson Glassfish
ANGUILLIDAE	Anguilla australis	Short-finned Eel
ANGUILLIDAE	Anguilla reinhardtii	Long-finned Eel
ANTENNARIIDAE	Antennarius striatus	Striated Frogfish
ARRIPIDAE	Arripis trutta	Eastern Australian Salmon
ATHERINIDAE	Atherinosoma microstoma	Smallmouth Hardyhead
ATHERINIDAE	Leptatherina presbyteroides	Silver Side
CALLIONYMIDAE	Repomucenus calcaratus	Spotted Stinkfish
CARANGIDAE	Pseudocaranx dentex	White Trevally
CLUPEIDAE	Herklotsichthys castelnaui	Southern Herring
ELEOTRIDAE	Philypnodon grandiceps	Flathead Gudgeon
GERREIDAE	Gerres subfasciatus	Silver Biddy
GERREIDAE	Girella tricuspida	Luderick
GOBIIDAE	Acentrogobius bifrenatus	Bridled Goby
GOBIIDAE	Afuragobius tamarensis	Tamar River Goby
GOBIIDAE	Callogobius sp.	Goby
GOBIIDAE	Favonigobius exquisitis	Exquisite Sand-goby
GOBIIDAE	Favonigobius lateralis	Goby
GOBIIDAE	Gobiopterus semivestita	Goby
GOBIIDAE	Parkraemeria ornata	Goby
GOBIIDAE	Pseudogobius olorum	Pseudogobius olorum
GONORHYNCHIDAE	Gonorhynchus greyi	Beaked Salmon
HEMIRHAMPHIDAE	Hyporhamphus regularis	Eastern River Garfish
ISONIDAE	Iso rhothophilus	Surf Sardine
LABRIDAE	Achoerodus viridis	Eastern Blue Groper
LABRIDAE	Coris sandeyeri	Eastern King Wrasse
MUGILIDAE	Liza argentea	Flat-tail Mullet
MUGILIDAE	Mugil cephalus	Sea Mullet
MUGILIDAE	Myxis elongatus	Sand Grey Mullet
PARALICHTHYIDAE	Pseudorhombus jenynsii	Small-toothed Flounder
PERCICHTHYIDAE	Macquaria colonorum	Estuary Perch
PLATYCEPHALIDAE	Platycephalus fuscus	Dusky Flathead
POECILIIDAE	Gambusia holbrooki	Eastern Gambusia
POMATOMIDAE	Pomatomus saltatrix	Tailor
PSEUDOMUGILIDAE	Pseudomugil signifer	Pacific Blue Eye
RHOMBOSOLEIDAE	Ammotretis rostratus	Long-nosed Flounder
SILLAGINIDAE	Sillago ciliata	Sand Whiting
SPARIDAE	Acanthopagrus australis	Yellowfin Bream
SPARIDAE	Rhabdosargus sarba	Tarwhine
SYGNATHIDAE	Urocampus carinirostris	Hairy Pipefish
TERAPONTIDAE	Terapon jarbua	Crescent Perch
TETRAODONTIDAE	Tetractenos glaber	Smooth toadfish
TETRAODONTIDAE	Tetractenos hamiltoni	Common Toadfish
TETRAROGIDAE	Centropogon australis	Fortescue
TRIGLIDAE	Chelidonichthys kumu	Red Gurnard

=== Mammals ===
Family	Species	Common name
BALAENIDAE	Eubalaena australis	Southern Right Whale
CANIDAE	Vulpes vulpes	Fox
DASYURIDAE	Antechinus stuartii	Brown Antechinus
FELIDAE	Felis catus	Cat
LEPORIDAE	Oryctolagus cuniculus	Rabbit
MACROPODIDAE	Wallabia bicolor	Swamp Wallaby
MINIOPTERIDAE	Miniopterus australis	Little Bentwing-Bat
MINIOPTERIDAE	Miniopterus schreibersii	Bent-Wing Bat
MOLOSSIDAE	Austronomus australis	White-Striped Freetail-Bat
MOLOSSIDAE	Mormopterus (Ozimops) ridei	Ride's Free-Tailed Bat
MURIDAE	Rattus fuscipes	Bush Rat
MURIDAE	Rattus lutreolus	Swamp Rat
MURIDAE	Rattus rattus	Ship Rat
OTARIIDAE	Arctocephalus tropicalis	Subantarctic Fur-seal
PERAMELIDAE	Isoodon macrourus	Northern Brown Bandicoot
PHALANGERIDAE	Trichosurus vulpecula	Australian Brushtail Possum
PHOCIDAE	Hydrurga leptonyx	Leopard Seal
PSEUDOCHEIRIDAE	Pseudocheirus peregrinus	Common Ringtail Possum
PTEROPODIDAE	Pteropus poliocephalus	Grey-Headed Flying-Fox
TACHYGLOSSIDAE	Tachyglossus aculeatus	Short-Beaked Echidna
VESPERTILIONIDAE	Chalinolobus gouldii	Gould's Wattled Bat
VESPERTILIONIDAE	Chalinolobus morio	Chocolate Wattled Bat
VESPERTILIONIDAE	Nyctophilus gouldi	Gould's Long-Eared Bat
VESPERTILIONIDAE	Vespadelus darlingtoni	Large Forest Bat
VESPERTILIONIDAE	Vespadelus pumilus	Eastern Forest Bat
VESPERTILIONIDAE	Vespadelus vulturnus	Little Forest Bat
VOMBATIDAE	Vombatus ursinus	Bare-Nosed Wombat

=== Reptiles ===
Family	Species	Common name
AGAMIDAE	Amphibolurus muricatus	Jacky Lizard
AGAMIDAE	Intellagama lesueurii	Water Dragon
AGAMIDAE	Rankinia diemensis	Mountain Dragon
COLUBRIDAE	Dendrelaphis punctulatus	Green Tree Snake
ELAPIDAE	Cacophis krefftii	Southern dwarf Crowned Snake
ELAPIDAE	Cacophis squamulosus	Golden Crowned Snake
ELAPIDAE	Demansia psammophis	Yellow-Faced Whip Snake
ELAPIDAE	Hemiaspis signata	Hemiaspis signata
ELAPIDAE	Pseudechis porphyriacus	Red-Bellied Black Snake
GEKKONIDAE	Phyllurus platurus	Leaf-tailed Gecko
PYGOPODIDAE	Pygopus lepidopodus	Common Scaly-Foot
PYTHONIDAE	Morelia spilota	Diamond Python
SCINCIDAE	Bellatorias major	Land Mullet
SCINCIDAE	Ctenotus robustus	Robust Ctenotus
SCINCIDAE	Eulamprus quoyii	Eastern Water Skink
SCINCIDAE	Lampropholis delicata	Dark-Flecked Garden Sunskink
SCINCIDAE	Lampropholis guichenoti	Pale-Flecked Garden Sunskink
SCINCIDAE	Saiphos equalis	Three-toed Skink
SCINCIDAE	Saproscincus mustelinum	Weasel Skink
SCINCIDAE	Tiliqua scincoides	Eastern Blue-Tongue
TYPHLOPIDAE	Ramphotyphlops nigrescens	Common Blind Snake

== See also ==
- List of lakes of Australia
