= Toowoon Bay =

Coordinates: 33°21′25″S 151°29′35″E

- Suburb
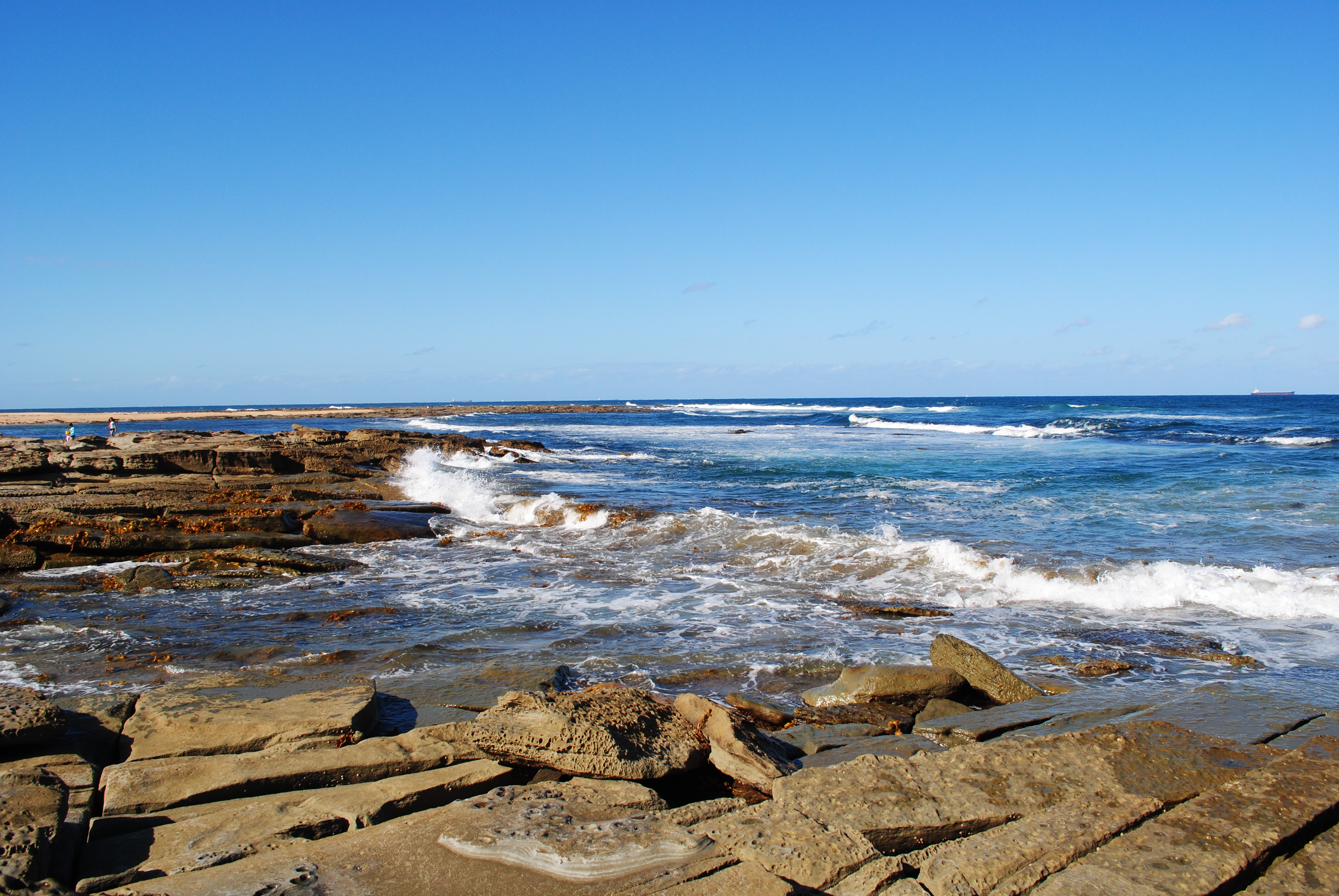
- Toowoon Bay c. 2010
- Interactive map of Toowoon Bay
- Country: Australia
- State: New South Wales
- City: Central Coast
- LGA: Central Coast Council
- Location: 4 km (2.5 mi) S of The Entrance; 22 km (14 mi) ENE of Gosford; 98 km (61 mi) NNE of Sydney; 66 km (41 mi) SSW of Newcastle

Government
  - State electorate: The Entrance
  - Federal division: Dobell

Area
  - Total: 0.6 km^{2} (0.23 sq mi)
- Elevation: 11 m (36 ft)

Population
  - Total: 548 (2011 census)
  - Density: 910/km^{2} (2,370/sq mi)
- Postcode: 2261
- Parish: Tuggerah
Suburbs around Toowoon Bay
Long Jetty	Blue Bay	Blue Bay
Long Jetty	Toowoon Bay	Pacific Ocean
Shelly Beach	Shelly Beach	Pacific Ocean

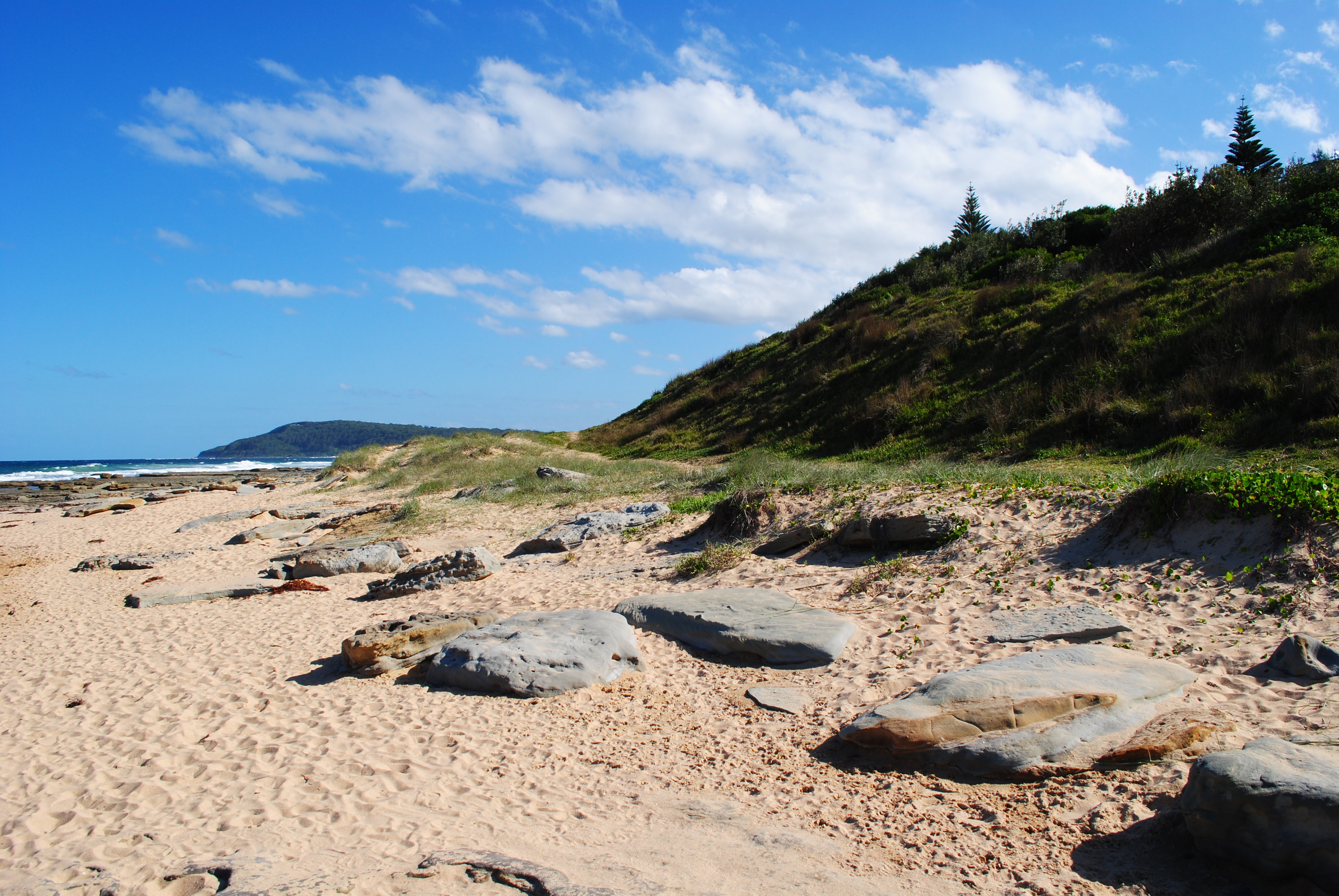
A view of the bay and beach

Toowoon Bay is a suburb of the Central Coast region of New South Wales, Australia, located on a peninsula between Tuggerah Lake and the Pacific Ocean south of The Entrance. It is part of the Central Coast Council local government area.

== Location ==
Toowoon Bay's village centre is within The Entrance district and is situated at the intersection of Toowoon Bay Rd and Bay Rd (which is a tourist route to The Entrance).

The Toowoon Bay beach is located at the eastern end of Toowoon Bay Rd with access from Bay Road (250 metres south of the village intersection). The beach is patrolled by Central Coast Council Lifeguard's during week days and lifesaver volunteers from the Toowoon Bay SLSC on weekends during summer. The Toowoon Bay SLSC has a strong local following within The Entrance district. In 2005, the Toowoon Bay SLSC had a new clubhouse constructed.

The beach is popular for swimming and fishing, with a gentle surf as the beach is protected from winds and strong currents. Sail boarding and kite surfing are popular out on the bay.

The closest shopping centre with full supermarket, banks, and general retail is at The Entrance. It is also at The Entrance where recreation facilities including the ocean baths, cricket pitch, and memorial park are located.

== Education ==
Children from Toowoon Bay are in the area for The Entrance Public School.

== Transport ==
Toowoon Bay is serviced by The Entrance Red Bus Service with one route to The Entrance. The closest railway station is Tuggerah railway station which is serviced by the Central Coast & Newcastle Line.
