= Shelly Beach, Central Coast New South Wales =

Coordinates: 33°21′54″S 151°30′04″E

Shelly Beach
- Suburb
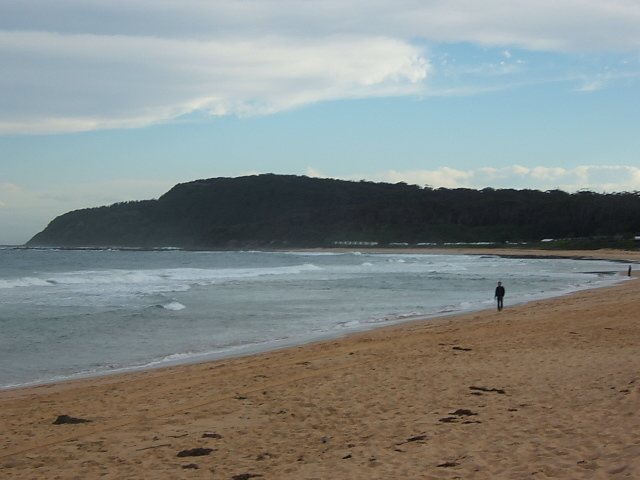
- Shelly Beach on a windy day in 2010, taken from the sand dunes. Crackneck Lookout in the background.
- Interactive map of Shelly Beach
- Country: Australia
- State: New South Wales
- City: Central Coast
- LGA: Central Coast Council
- Location: 5 km (3.1 mi) S of The Entrance; 20 km (12 mi) ENE of Gosford; 102 km (63 mi) NNE of Sydney; 67 km (42 mi) SSW of Newcastle

Government
  - State electorate: The Entrance
  - Federal division: Dobell

Area
  - Total: 1.3 km^{2} (0.50 sq mi)
- Elevation: 10 m (33 ft)

Population
  - Total: 1,266 (2011 census)
  - Density: 970/km^{2} (2,520/sq mi)
- Postcode: 2261
- Parish: Tuggerah
Suburbs around Shelly Beach
| Long Jetty | Long Jetty | Toowoon Bay |
| Killarney Vale | Shelly Beach | Pacific Ocean |
| Bateau Bay | Bateau Bay | Pacific Ocean |

Shelly Beach is a coastal suburb of the Central Coast region of New South Wales, Australia, located east of Tuggerah Lake and bordering the Pacific Ocean south of The Entrance. It is part of the Central Coast Council local government area. It is 66 km south of Newcastle & 93 km north of Sydney. Shelly Beach is considered one of the most popular surfing beaches on the Central Coast.

Shelly Beach Golf Club (previously Tuggerah Lakes Gold Club) is an 18-hole golf course located at the eastern end of Shelly Beach Road, overlooking Shelly Beach. It was formally established in 1930, originally being located at Killarney Vale until 1954 when it moved to its present location.

Within the suburb there is the Shelly Beach Surf Club and the Shelly Beach Fossils soccer club.

== Transportation ==
Red Bus CDC NSW operates routes through Shelly Beach (11, 12, 21, 22, 23). Route 21 operates from The Entrance North to Gosford regularly.

== Notable people ==
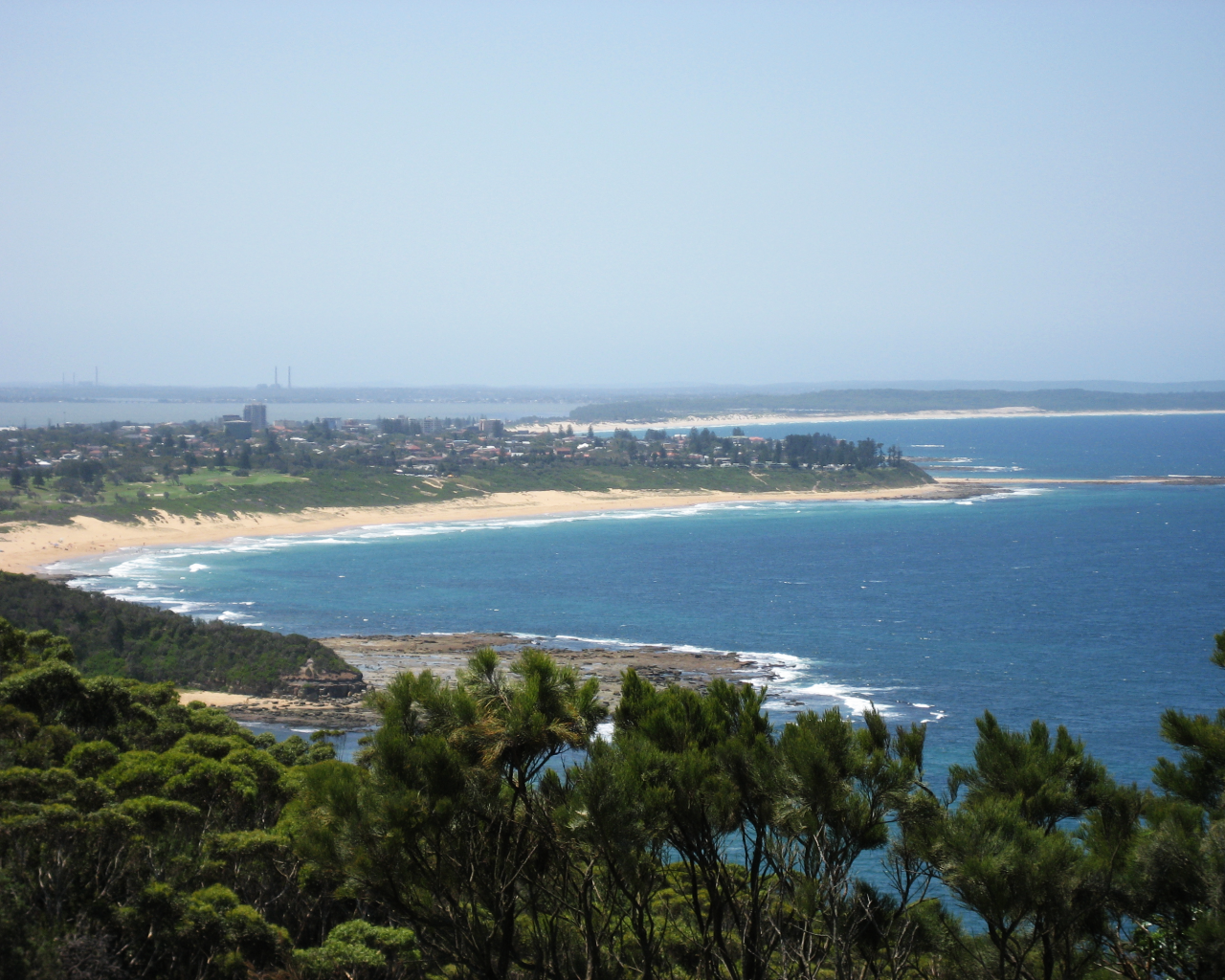

- Nikki Garrett – golfer
- Banjo Paterson – poet
- Shelly Beach Holiday Park
- Blue Lagoon Beach Resort
