= Killarney Vale, New South Wales =

Coordinates: 33°21′54″S 151°27′36″E

Killarney Vale
- Suburb
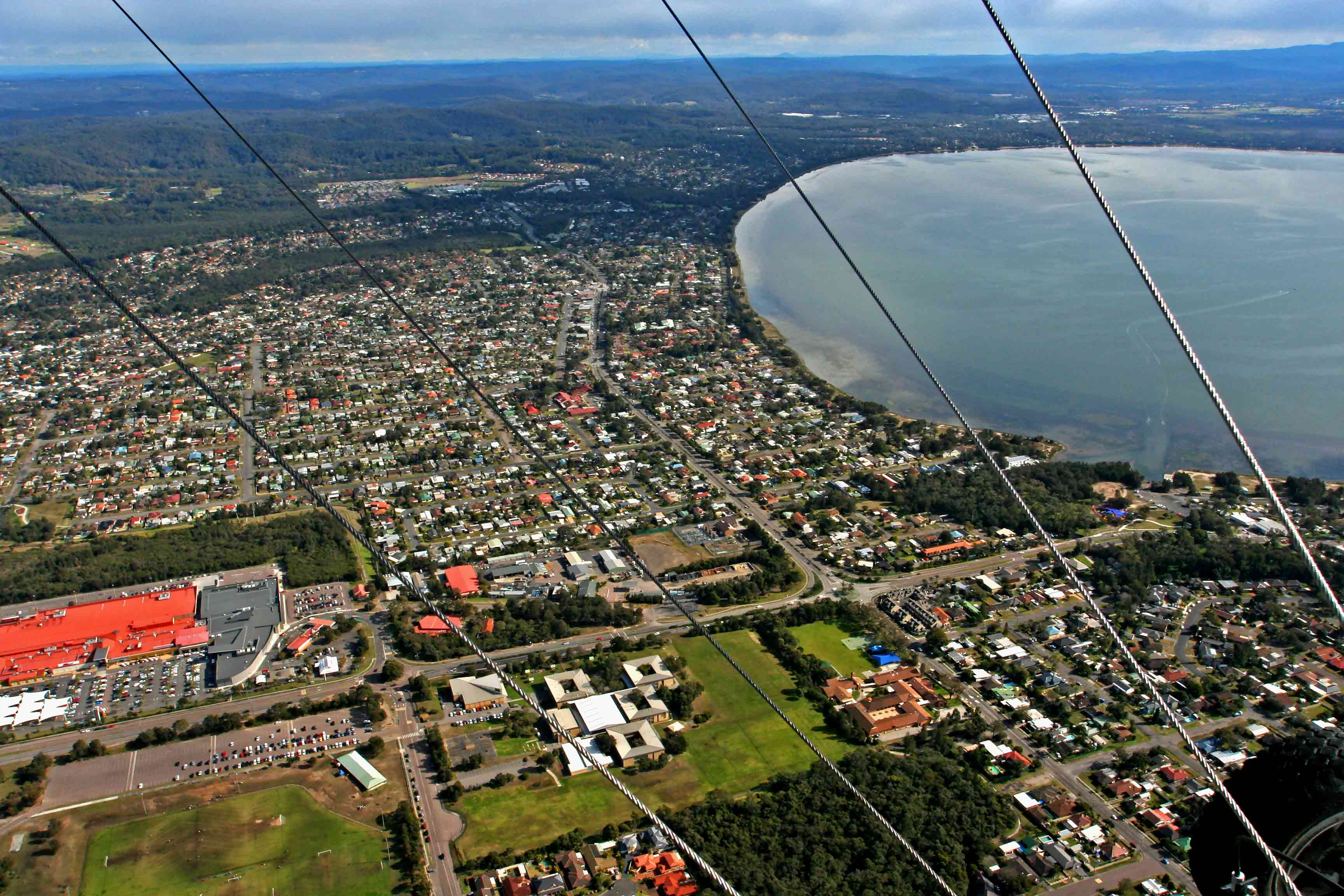
- Interactive map of Killarney Vale
- Country: Australia
- State: New South Wales
- City: Central Coast
- LGA: Central Coast Council
- Location: 4 km (2.5 mi) SSW of The Entrance; 11 km (6.8 mi) NNE of Wyong; 21 km (13 mi) ENE of Gosford; 70 km (43 mi) SSW of Newcastle; 101 km (63 mi) NNE of Sydney

Government
  - State electorate: The Entrance
  - Federal division: Dobell

Area
  - Total: 3.1 km^{2} (1.2 sq mi)
- Elevation: 6 m (20 ft)

Population
  - Total: 7,491 (SAL 2021)
- Postcode: 2261
- Parish: Tuggerah
Suburbs around Killarney Vale
| Berkeley Vale | Tuggerah Lake | Long Jetty |
| Tumbi Umbi | Killarney Vale | Shelly Beach |
| Tumbi Umbi | Tumbi Umbi | Bateau Bay |

Killarney Vale 1958 Real Estate Advertising

Killarney Vale is a suburb of the Central Coast region of New South Wales, Australia, located approximately 5 kilometres south of The Entrance. It is part of the Central Coast Council local government area.

The Entrance – Long Jetty hospital is located in Killarney Vale. It is a Community Health Centre of NSW Department of Health. It does not have an Accident or Emergency service. The hospital is located in buildings that were originally built as the club house for Tuggerah Lakes Golf Club.

Killarney Vale contains two public primary schools. Wyong Road is the main road that runs through Killarney Vale linking The Entrance to Wyong. A second main road running along the south western edge is Eastern Road.

Along Wyong Road, there are Killarney Vale shops which includes a small supermarket. As a local shopping area there is a pharmacy, medical, bakery, and other specialist retail.

It was named after the town of Killarney in Ireland.

== Population ==
According to the 2021 census, there were 7,491 people in Killarney Vale.

- Aboriginal and Torres Strait Islander people made up 5.9% of the population.
- 85.0% of people were born in Australia, the next most common countries of birth included England 2.8%, New Zealand 1.1, the Philippines 0.5%, Scotland 0.4%, and Malaysia 0.4%.
- 89.3% of people spoke only English at home, the next most common languages spoken at home included Spanish 0.4%, Mandarin 0.4%, Cantonese 0.3%, Greek 0.2%, and Italian 0.2%.
- The most common responses for religion included No Religion 40.1%, Catholic 22.3%, Anglican 17.4%, and Uniting Church 2.2%, a further 8.0% of respondents for this area elected not to disclose their religious status.
