= Blue Bay, New South Wales =

Blue Bay Central Coast, New South Wales
- Coordinates: 33°21′11″S 151°30′4″E
- Population: 1,027 (2016 census)
  - Density: 1,710/km^{2} (4,400/sq mi)
- Postcode(s): 2261
- Elevation: 19 m (62 ft)
- Area: 0.6 km^{2} (0.2 sq mi)
- Location: 2 km (1 mi) S of The Entrance; 22 km (14 mi) ENE of Gosford; 97 km (60 mi) NNE of Sydney; 65 km (40 mi) SSW of Newcastle
- LGA(s): Central Coast Council
- Parish: Tuggerah
- State electorate(s): The Entrance
- Federal division(s): Dobell
Suburbs around Blue Bay:
The Entrance	The Entrance	The Entrance
Long Jetty	Blue Bay	Pacific Ocean
Long Jetty	Toowoon Bay	Pacific Ocean

Blue Bay is a location of The Entrance district within the Central Coast region of New South Wales, Australia, located on a peninsula between Tuggerah Lake and the Pacific Ocean south of The Entrance. It is part of the Central Coast Council local government area.

Blue Bay is served by The Entrance for retail, commercial, education, and recreation services.There is one fish and chip Shop, Blue Bay beach has toilet and outdoor showers.
