= North Avoca =

Coordinates: 33°27′25″S 151°26′06″E

North Avoca Central Coast, New South Wales
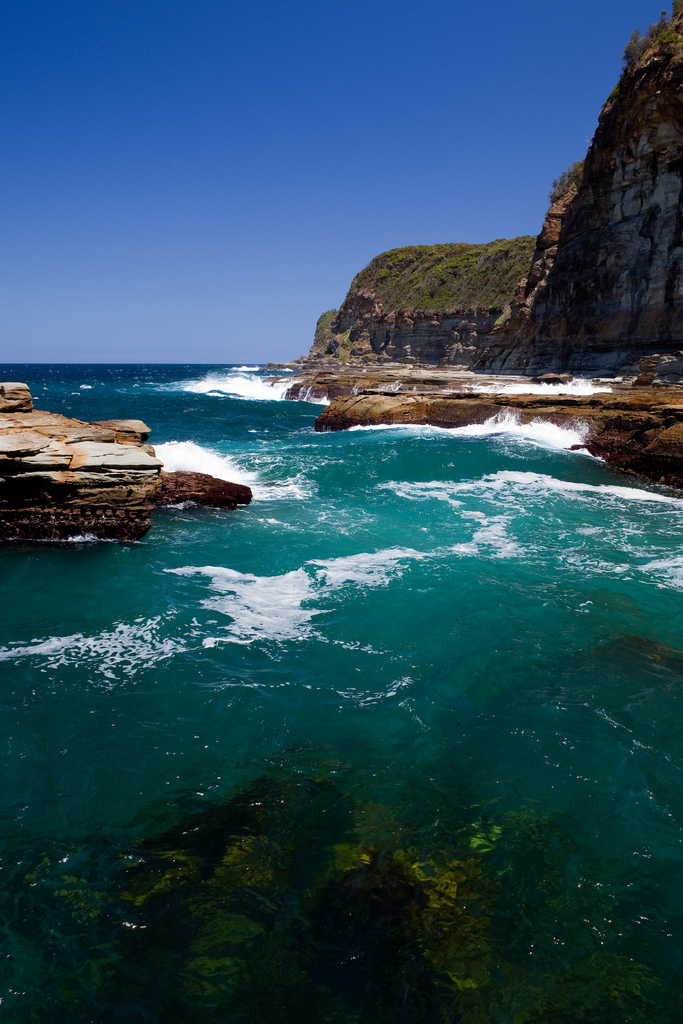
- North Avoca
- Population: 2,200 (2016 census)
  - Density: 850/km^{2} (2,190/sq mi)
- Postcode(s): 2260
- Elevation: 11 m (36 ft)
- Area: 2.6 km^{2} (1.0 sq mi)
- Location: 13 km (8 mi) E of Gosford; 2 km (1 mi) SW of Terrigal; 16 km (10 mi) SSW of The Entrance; 88 km (55 mi) NNE of Sydney
- LGA(s): Central Coast Council
- Parish: Kincumber
- State electorate(s): Terrigal
- Federal division(s): Robertson
Suburbs around North Avoca:
Terrigal	Terrigal
Terrigal	North Avoca	Tasman Sea
Avoca Beach	Avoca Beach

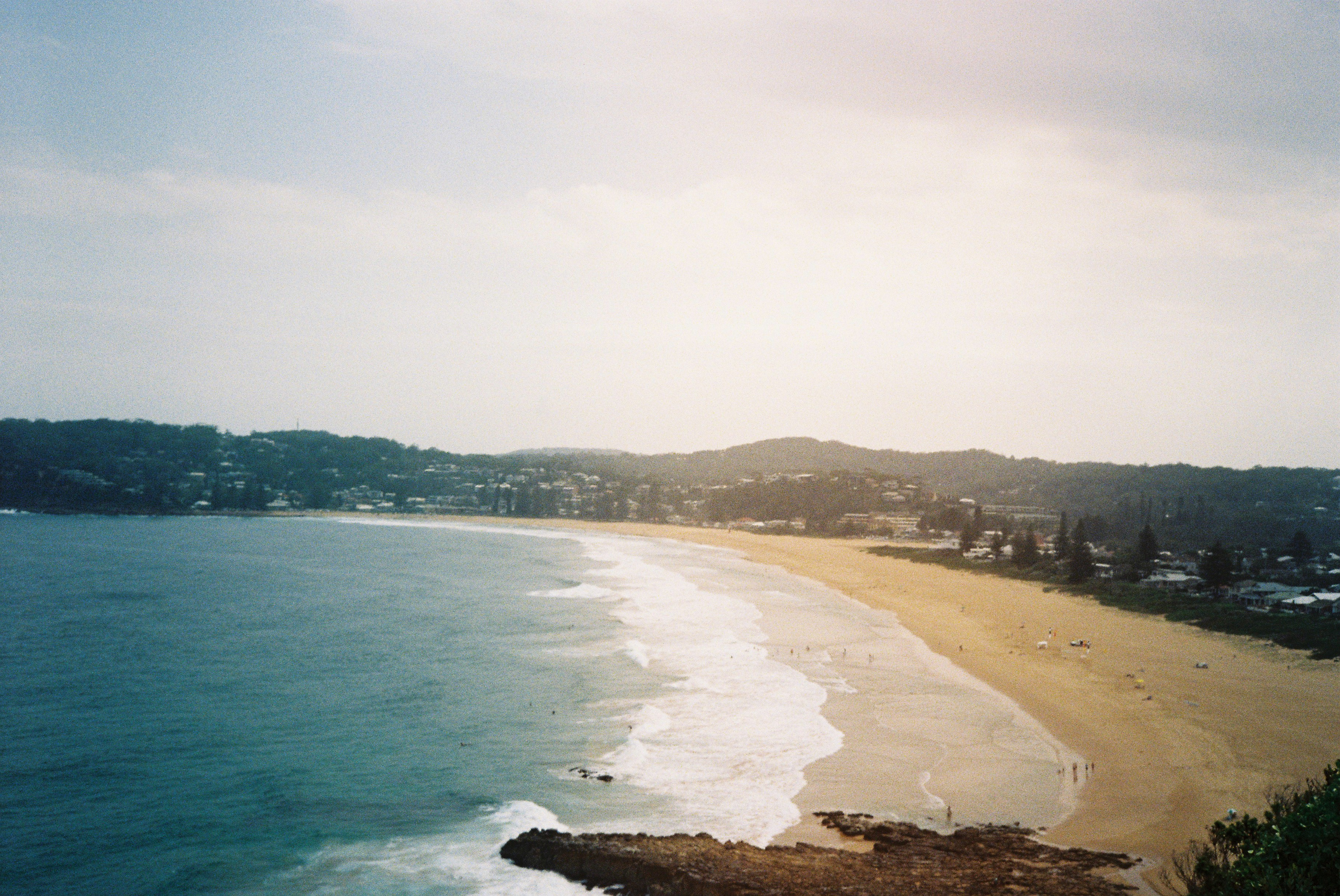
View of North Avoca

North Avoca (/əˈvoʊkə/) is a south-eastern suburb of the Central Coast region of New South Wales, Australia between Avoca Beach and Terrigal on the Tasman Sea coast. It is part of the Central Coast Council local government area.
