= Long Jetty, New South Wales =

Coordinates: 33°21′25″S 151°29′06″E

Long Jetty
- Suburb
- Interactive map of Long Jetty
- Country: Australia
- State: New South Wales
- City: Central Coast
- LGA: Central Coast Council
- Location: 2 km (1.2 mi) SSW of The Entrance; 105 km (65 mi) NNE of Sydney; 21 km (13 mi) NE of Gosford; 67 km (42 mi) SSW of Newcastle

Government
  - State electorate: The Entrance
  - Federal division: Dobell

Area
  - Total: 2.4 km^{2} (0.93 sq mi)
- Elevation: 2 m (6.6 ft)

Population
  - Total: 6,736 (SAL 2021)
- Postcode: 2261
- Parish: Tuggerah
Suburbs around Long Jetty
Tuggerah Lake	The Entrance	The Entrance
Tuggerah Lake	Long Jetty	Blue Bay
Killarney Vale	Shelly Beach	Toowoon Bay

Long Jetty is a suburb of the Central Coast region of New South Wales, Australia, located on a peninsula between Tuggerah Lake and the Pacific Ocean south of The Entrance. It is part of the Central Coast Council local government area.

The only street in The Entrance district to go from the lake to the sea starts in Long Jetty as Toowoon Bay Road.

== History ==
The jetty after which the town was named is located at the end of Archbold Road. In 1914, Long Jetty was built by Mr William Henry Price, to service his private estate. The jetty was opened in 1915 and celebrated 100 years in 2015. This provided a cross lake service with Wyong. At the time, some of the main services for Long Jetty were located around The Entrance Road / Archibold Street area including the former post office.

== Landmarks ==
Long Jetty has previously had a number of recreation services for visitors in the caravan parks and tourist accommodations. This includes the former Savoy theatre (part of the R. Wain & Co Pty. Ltd. group) and the Long Jetty Roller Skating rink (currently the paint ball centre). The theatre was, following its closure, a Jewel Supermarket.

Up until the early 1990s, Long Jetty had many financial service organisations, operating mainly as agencies of The Entrance. This included Commonwealth Bank, Westpac, State Building Society (St. George), and State Bank. Whilst the buildings remain between Thompson Street and Pacific Street (backing on to Bank Lane) on The Entrance Road all have closed. In the most recent years Long Jetty has had a mini-revitalisation as a location for new- and second-hand furniture, clothing, children's toys, books, surfing gear and cafés.

Jubilee Oval is located in Long Jetty. It is a cricket oval for The Entrance Cricket Club, together with Taylor Park at The Entrance. After many decades of progressive land acquisition, the Oval crossed Rhodin Drive to link with Sir Baden-Powell Reserve. The reserve is the location of 1st Tuggerah Lakes Scout Group and was also the former location of 2nd Tuggerah Lakes Sea Scouts.

== Transportation ==
Red Bus CDC NSW is the local bus operator and operates several routes through Long Jetty, namely routes 21–26 and route 29.
