= David Mehan =

Australian politician

David Mehan MP

Member of the New South Wales Legislative Assembly for The Entrance
- Incumbent
- Assumed office 28 March 2015
- Preceded by: Chris Spence

Parliamentary Secretary to the Treasurer
- Incumbent
- Assumed office 26 April 2023
- Minister: Daniel Mookhey
- Preceded by: Felicity Wilson

Personal details
- Born: 23 June
- Party: Labor Party
- Education: University of Newcastle; University of Sydney
- Occupation: Geologist
- Website: www.davidmehan.com.au

Military service
- Allegiance: Australia
- Branch/service: Australian Army Reserve
- Years of service: 1984–1990
- Rank: Lieutenant

David Raymond Mehan is an Australian politician who was elected to the New South Wales Legislative Assembly as the member for The Entrance for the Labor Party at the 2015 New South Wales state election.

Mehan previously worked in the construction industry as an engineering geologist specialising in landslides and earthquakes. He also contested for the seat of Dobell in the 2004 federal election but lost to the sitting member at the time Ken Ticehurst. Mehan has previously contested for his current seat in the 2011 election. He was appointed as a parliamentary secretary in 2023.

New South Wales Legislative Assembly
Preceded by Chris Spence	Member for The Entrance; 2015–present	Incumbent
