= Wamberal =

- Suburb
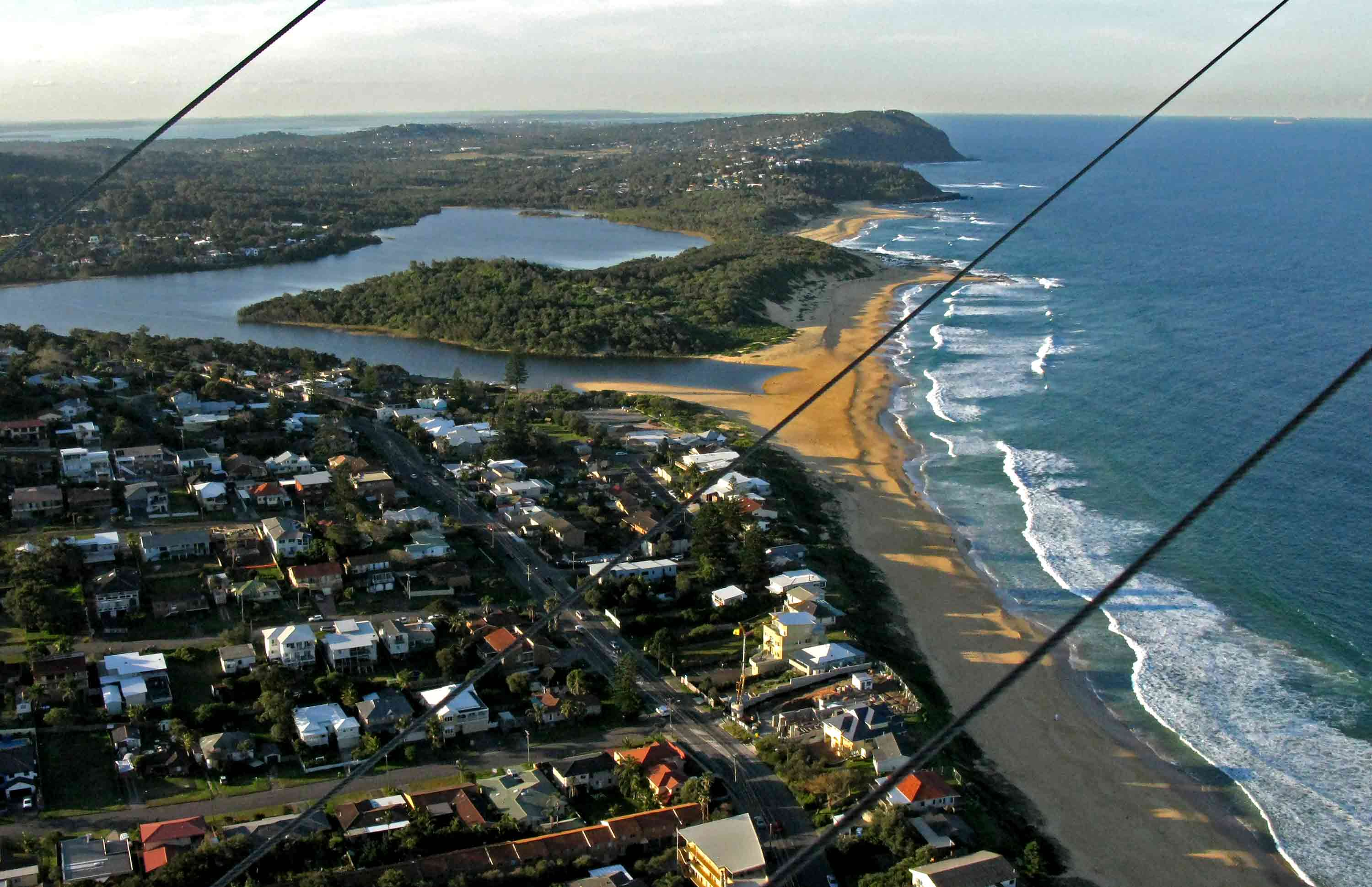
- Aerial view of Wamberal Beach

- Interactive map of Wamberal
- Coordinates: 33°25′5″S 151°26′35″E
- Country: Australia
- State: New South Wales
- City: Central Coast
- LGA: Central Coast Council
- Location: 12 km (7.5 mi) ENE of Gosford; 4 km (2.5 mi) N of Terrigal; 12 km (7.5 mi) SSW of The Entrance; 88 km (55 mi) NNE of Sydney

Government
  - State electorate: Terrigal
  - Federal division: Dobell

Area
  - Total: 6.5 km^{2} (2.5 sq mi)
- Elevation: 11 m (36 ft)

Population
  - Total: 6,298 (2011 census)
  - Density: 969/km^{2} (2,509/sq mi)
- Postcode: 2260
- Parish: Kincumber
Suburbs around Wamberal
Tumbi Umbi	Forresters Beach	Forresters Beach
Matcham	Wamberal	Tasman Sea
Erina Heights	Terrigal	Tasman Sea

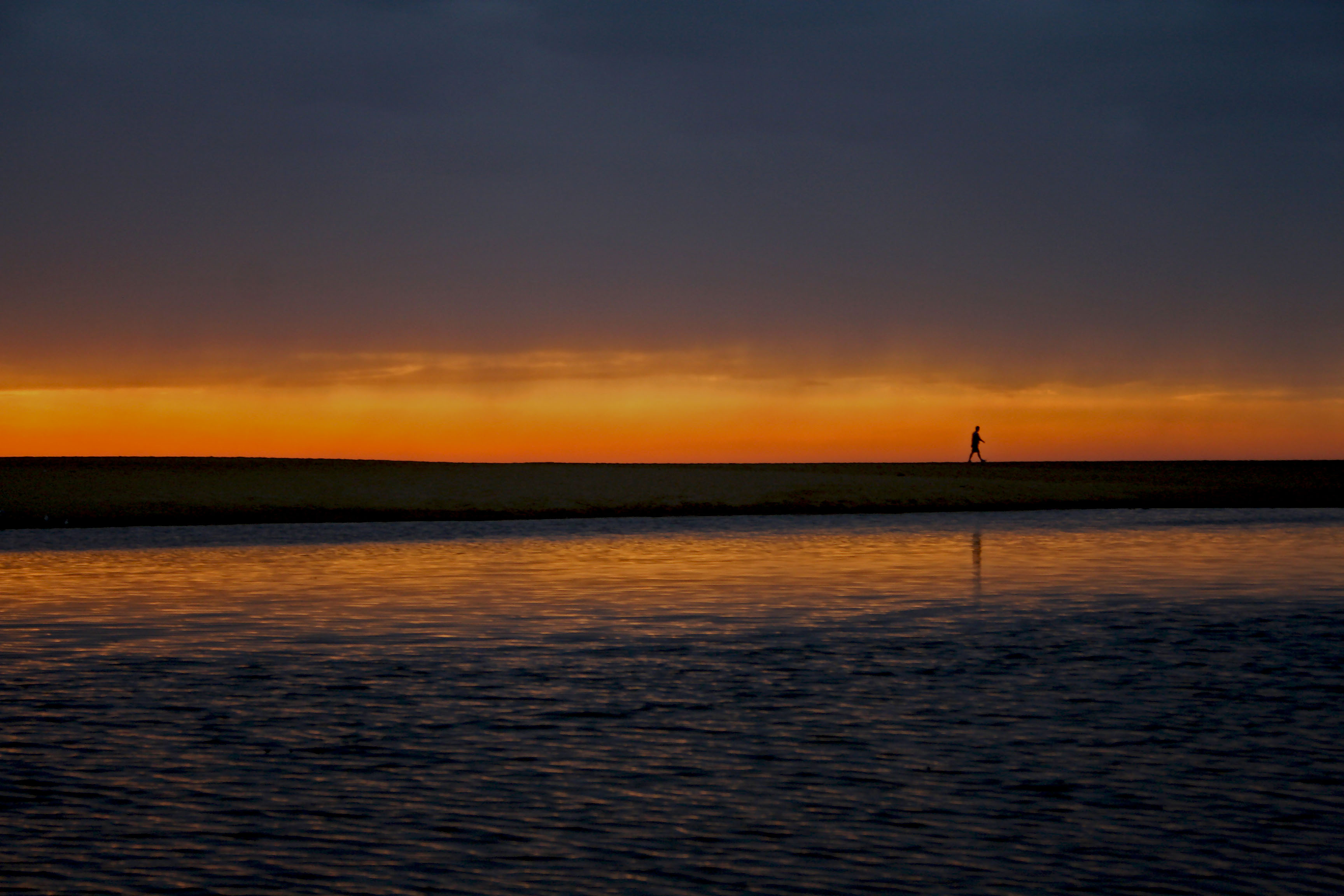
Wamberal on the Lake

Wamberal (/ˈwɒmbərəl/) is a coastal suburb of the Central Coast region of New South Wales, Australia. It is part of the Central Coast Council local government area and is located adjacent to the Wamberal Lagoon. Wamberal is an Aboriginal word meaning 'where the sea breaks'.

== Geography and amenities ==
Wamberal is the next suburb from Terrigal, with the two suburbs being separated by the Terrigal Lagoon Estuary.

The suburb has two distinct areas; there is a coastal strip that includes Wamberal Beach and the Lagoon estuary which houses medium to high-density residential properties, as well as a semi-rural area, slightly west of the beach. The latter contains coastal acreages and ridges of bushland which are legislated non-development areas to retain the area's ecosystem.

The main thoroughfare through the suburb is the Central Coast Highway through the north and south, previously known as The Entrance Road. Since 2008, the roadway has undergone developments at an estimated cost of A$100 million into a four-lane dual carriageway from Matcham to the north end of the suburb. Servicing the suburb from the south-east is Ocean View Drive, linking Wamberal to Terrigal.

Wamberal has small clusters of high-end cafes, restaurants and boutique stores dotted along the beachfront strip, Ocean View Drive, and on nearby streets. In 2009 the Wamberal Surf Life Saving Club was redeveloped to accommodate a cafe and restaurant, in addition to new function rooms and surf life-saving amenities. Wamberal also has a Country Club, "Breakers", commemorating ANZAC efforts; its amenities include a golf course, bowling green and tennis facilities in addition to a brasserie and various bars with gambling outlets.

Wamberal beach has 3.8 km of sand.

Swimming Wamberal is dominated by active and often strong rips, particularly north of the surf club. Definitely swim between the flags. The lagoon also offers a quieter swimming area. Usually there is an attached bar with only small rips, however higher waves will increase rip strength, so it is still best to stay between the flags.

Surfing Wamberal picks up more swell and generally has good beach breaks as well as waves over the northern reefs.

There is a government primary school in the rural sector of the suburb, teaching kindergarten through grade six.

Storms in 2020 highlighted problems of erosion that remain unresolved.

== Demographics ==
At the 2011 census, there were 6,298 people in Wamberal, of which 48.8% were male and 51.2% were female. Aboriginal and Torres Strait Islander people made up 1.3% of the population. The median age in Wamberal was 38 years, just above the national median of 37. Children aged 0–14 years made up 21.4% of the population, while people aged 65 years and over made up 13.9% of the population, just below the national median of 14%. Of people in the suburb aged 15 years and over, 54.3% were married and 11.1% were either divorced or separated.

Population growth in Wamberal between the 2001 and 2006 censuses was 5.08% (national average 5.78%) and in the five years to the 2011 census, it was 10.24% (national average 8.32%). The median weekly income for Wamberal residents was about 25% higher than the national average.

At the 2011 census, the proportion of residents in Wamberal who stated their ancestry as Australian or Anglo-Saxon exceeded 83%. More than 60% of Wamberal residents nominated a religious affiliation with Christianity, which was significantly higher than the national average of 50.2%. Compared to the national average, households in Wamberal had a lower proportion (6.3%) where two or more languages are spoken (national average 20.4%), and a higher proportion (92.6%) where only English was spoken at home (national average 76.8%).

Selected historical census data for the suburb of Wamberal
Census year		2001	2006	2011
Population	Estimated residents on Census night	5,437	5,713	6,298
Population	% of Gosford local government area population	3.53%	▲3.61%	▲3.88%
Population	% of New South Wales population	0.09%	0.09%	0.09%
Population	% of Australian population	0.03%	0.03%	0.03%
Cultural and language diversity				
Ancestry, top responses	English			32.5%
Ancestry, top responses	Australian			30.2%
Ancestry, top responses	Irish			9.7%
Ancestry, top responses	Scottish			8.3%
Ancestry, top responses	German			2.2%
Language, top responses (other than English)	Italian	0.5%	▼0.4%	▲0.5%
Language, top responses (other than English)	German	0.2%	0.2%	▲0.4%
Language, top responses (other than English)	Spanish	n/c	n/c	▲0.3%
Language, top responses (other than English)	Greek	0.3%	▼0.2%	▲0.3%
Language, top responses (other than English)	Cantonese	0.3%	n/c	▲0.3%
Religious affiliation				
Religious affiliation, top responses	Catholic	27.1%	▼27.2%	▲27.3%
Religious affiliation, top responses	Anglican	30.0%	▼26.4%	▼25.1%
Religious affiliation, top responses	No Religion	14.1%	▲16.4%	▲21.5%
Religious affiliation, top responses	Uniting Church	6.9%	▼5.1%	▼4.9%
Religious affiliation, top responses	Presbyterian and Reformed	4.8%	▼3.5%	▼3.0%
Median weekly incomes				
Personal income	Median weekly personal income		A$528	A$662
Personal income	% of Australian median income		113.3%	▲114.7%
Family income	Median weekly family income		A$1,123	A$1,771
Family income	% of Australian median income		109.3%	▲119.6%
Household income	Median weekly household income		A$1,286	A$1,552
Household income	% of Australian median income		109.8%	▲125.8%

== Property ==
The prestige of Wamberal's property has increased dramatically in recent years largely due to leafy and family-friendly streets, shrinking availability of land, and the suburb's proximity to local amenities including public transport, commercial and industrial areas, and education while remaining distant. This motif was heralded in 2008 by the passing in at auction of a 1940s bungalow on a double block of beachfront land at A$7.2 million. The property has since been redeveloped, believed to be worth more than $10 million, which would make it the most valuable home on the Central Coast.

This practice of redevelopment of property within Wamberal is shifting property prices further upmarket and moving the suburb further into the limelight with wealthier home buyers. This shift may also be due to the redevelopment of local amenities such as playgrounds and community spaces such as parks, some of which were initiated under the Nation Building Scheme of the Rudd Government's Economic Stimulus Policy. In September 2010, the median house price for Wamberal was $1.1 million.
