= Electoral district of The Entrance =

The Entrance New South Wales—Legislative Assembly
- Interactive map of district boundaries from the 2023 state election
- State: New South Wales
- Dates current: 1988–present
- MP: David Mehan
- Party: Labor Party
- Namesake: The Entrance
- Electors: 58,657 (2023)
- Area: 124.21 km^{2} (48.0 sq mi)
- Demographic: Provincial
Electorates around The Entrance:
Wyong	Wyong	Pacific Ocean
Gosford	The Entrance	Pacific Ocean
Gosford	Terrigal	Pacific Ocean

The Entrance is an electoral district of the Legislative Assembly located in the central-eastern part of the Central Coast Council on the Central Coast of New South Wales, Australia.

The Entrance is traditionally a marginal seat.

== Geography ==
On its current boundaries, The Entrance takes in the suburbs of Bateau Bay, Berkeley Vale, Blue Bay, Fountaindale, Glenning Valley, Kangy Angy, Killarney Vale, Lisarow, Long Jetty, Mount Elliot, Niagara Park, Ourimbah, Shelly Beach, Somersby, The Entrance, The Entrance North, Toowoon Bay, Tuggerah, Tumbi Umbi and Wyoming.

== Members for The Entrance ==
Member	Party	Term
Bob Graham	Liberal	1988–1991
Grant McBride	Labor	1992–2011
Chris Spence	Liberal	2011–2014
Chris Spence	Independent	2014–2015
David Mehan	Labor	2015–present

== Election results ==
2023 New South Wales state election: The Entrance
Party	Candidate	Votes	%	±%
Labor	David Mehan	22,153	45.0	+1.7
Liberal	Nathan Bracken	17,433	35.4	−2.3
Greens	Ralph Stephenson	4,206	8.6	+0.7
Sustainable Australia	Georgia Lamb	2,131	4.3	+1.9
Animal Justice	Fardin Pelarek	1,896	3.9	−0.2
Liberal Democrats	Bentley Logan	1,372	2.8	+2.8
Total formal votes		49,191	96.7	+1.0
Informal votes		1,688	3.3	−1.0
Turnout		50,879	86.7	−3.2
Two-party-preferred result
Labor	David Mehan	25,782	57.8	+2.5
Liberal	Nathan Bracken	18,793	42.2	−2.5
Labor hold		Swing	+2.5	
