= Forresters Beach =

Forresters Beach Central Coast, New South Wales
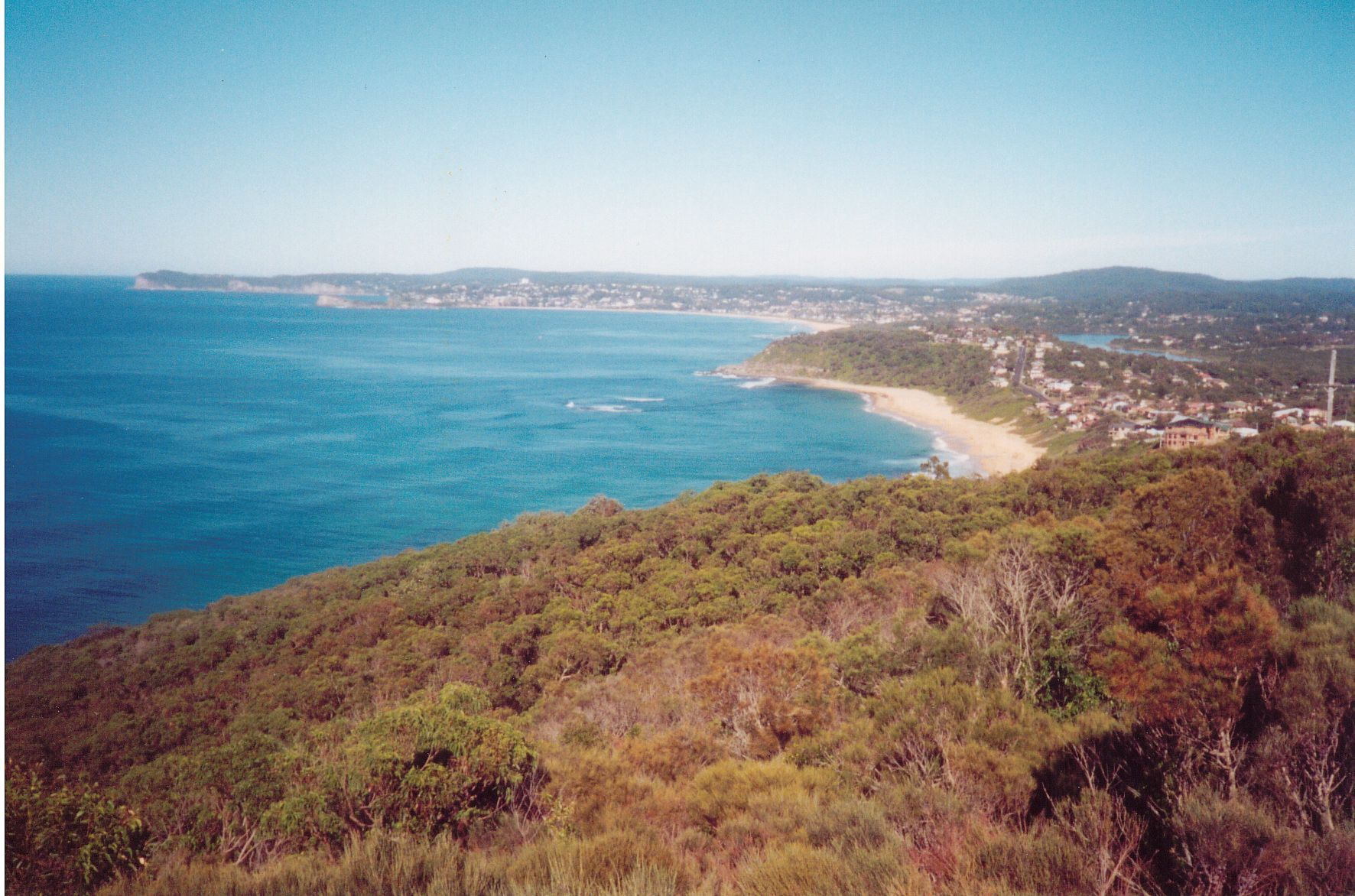
- Forresters Beach

- Coordinates: 33°24′25″S 151°28′34″E
- Population: 2,900 (2016 census)
  - Density: 1,160/km^{2} (3,000/sq mi)
- Postcode(s): 2260
- Elevation: 18 m (59 ft)
- Area: 2.5 km^{2} (1.0 sq mi)
- Location: 15 km (9 mi) ENE of Gosford; 8 km (5 mi) S of The Entrance; 72 km (45 mi) SSW of Newcastle; 97 km (60 mi) NNE of Sydney
- LGA(s): Central Coast Council
- Parish: Kincumber
- State electorate(s): Terrigal
- Federal division(s): Dobell
Suburbs around Forresters Beach:
| Tumbi Umbi | Bateau Bay | Bateau Bay |
| Wamberal | Forresters Beach | Pacific Ocean |
| Wamberal | Wamberal | Pacific Ocean |

Forresters Beach is a coastal suburb of the Central Coast region of New South Wales, Australia between Terrigal and Bateau Bay. It forms part of the Central Coast Council local government area. Forresters Beach's reef breaks are well known to surfers. Its name comes from Robert Forrester who purchased 50 acres (200,000 m^{2}) of land in 1861.

== Population ==
In the 2016 Census 2,900 people resided in Forresters Beach. 82.5% of people were born in Australia. The next most common country of birth was England at 4.8%. 92.1% of people spoke only English at home. The most common responses for religion were No Religion 30.8%, Catholic 25.0% and Anglican 20.7%.

== Retirement Village ==
The Glen Group sought to purchase land in 2004 to build a large Retirement Village at Forresters Beach. Local residents, who felt that the new village would increase population density and the "isolation" of the area would become endangered, opposed the sale. Local residents went to the local council in an attempt to block the development; however, the attempt failed and the village was built. In 2006 the village became open for retirees to move in.

The Village took the place of Forresters Beach Fun Park which throughout the years had been home to Forresters Beach Bowling Alley, Waterslides, Maze, Bungey Jumping, Go-Karts and home of the Forresters Beach Markets, which were popular in the 1990s. The Putt Putt and Swingers 9 Hole golf course no longer remain in the area.

== Wyrrabalong National Park ==
The park covers 597 ha but is divided into two separate areas. Wyrrabalong, meaning 'headland looking over the sea' is a word of the Darkinjung people who once occupied the narrow strip of coastline between Forresters Beach and Bateau Bay, which now constitutes the southern section of the park (140 ha). The southern section is characterised by high, exposed coastal cliffs of sandstone and shale and extensive rock platforms at either end that are ideal for fishing and exploring at low tide. There are woodlands of blackbutt, spotted gum and bloodwood along the plateau, with shrubs and heath (mostly coastal banksia and she-oak) on the gentler slopes to the west. Marine and bird life are abundant in the area. Fauna includes goannas, bandicoots, fantails and the tawny frogmouth. Wyrrabalong Lookout is located on Cromarty Hill. There is a car park and an adjacent concrete platform with views to the south and west. This site is also the major TV tower translator for the Wyong area, broadcasting as far as Yarramalong. A short path leads to Wyrrabalong Lookout on the cliff's edge, 132 m above sea-level, from where there are views south to The Skillion. A 1.6 km walking track leads along the cliffs through the attractive woodland to the other viewing platform, Crackneck Lookout (95 m high) where there is a large clearing and car park with information boards and a picnic-barbecue area.

== See also ==
- Wyrrabalong National Park
