= Chris Spence (politician) =

Australian politician

Member of the New South Wales Parliament for The Entrance
- In office 26 March 2011 – 6 March 2015
- Preceded by: Grant McBride
- Succeeded by: David Mehan

Leader of One Nation ACT
- In office December 1997 – January 1998
- Preceded by: Shaun Nelson
- Succeeded by: Party dissolved

Personal details
- Party: Independent (2014–present)
- Other political affiliations: One Nation (1997–2004); Liberal (2009–2014)
- Occupation: Politician

Christopher Spence is an Australian politician who was a member of the New South Wales Legislative Assembly representing The Entrance for the Liberal Party from the 2011 New South Wales state election until 19 February 2014 when he moved to the parliamentary crossbench and sat as an independent after the Independent Commission Against Corruption heard evidence that Spence may have breached electoral funding laws. He retired in 2015.

== Early career and background ==
Before becoming an MP, Spence played a prominent role in what was dubbed "Iguanagate", in which the then NSW minister for education, John Della Bosca, and his wife, federal politician Belinda Neal were accused of threatening and abusing the staff of Iguana Joe's restaurant in Gosford on 6 June 2008. Spence provided the paperwork, and witnessed the statutory declarations of six employees of Iguana Joe's, which was presented as evidence against the couple. The scandal resulted in Della Bosca being stood down from his ministerial position and Kevin Rudd, in his first incarnation as prime minister, ordering Neal to undertake anger management counselling.

== Political career ==
Spence joined the Liberal Party in his 30s, working as electoral officer for one-time deputy Liberal leader Chris Hartcher. Before this he had been a member of One Nation, serving as national president of the party's youth wing and twice standing for the party at state elections. In November 2009, he was preselected as the Liberal Party's candidate for The Entrance. His endorsement caused an uproar in state parliament over his former One Nation political involvement, with premier Nathan Rees attacking the party over the choice. Treasurer Eric Roozendaal said it represented a rise in extremism in the party and called for Spence to be disendorsed as a candidate. Spence himself has said that his involvement in One Nation was "a mistake" and claimed to have left the party when he concluded it didn't represent "the same values I did."

At the 2011 state election, Spence was elected with a swing of 17.3 points, receiving 62.5 percent of the two-party vote while also winning the primary vote with 50.9 percent. Spence's main opponent was Labor's David Mehan because the sitting member, Grant McBride, retired at the election.

In February 2014, the Independent Commission Against Corruption (ICAC) commenced investigating the allegations of electoral funding irregularities In response to the inquiry, the Liberal MPs Spence, Chris Hartcher and Darren Webber stood aside from the parliamentary party, even though they had just renominated for their seats, to sit as independents. With a delayed final report from the ICAC not due before the 2015 election campaign, Spence and the other two MPs were forced not to contest the 2015 state election and to retire from politics.

New South Wales Legislative Assembly
Preceded by Grant McBride	Member for The Entrance; 2011–2015	Succeeded by David Mehan
