= Grant McBride =

Australian politician

The Honourable Grant McBride
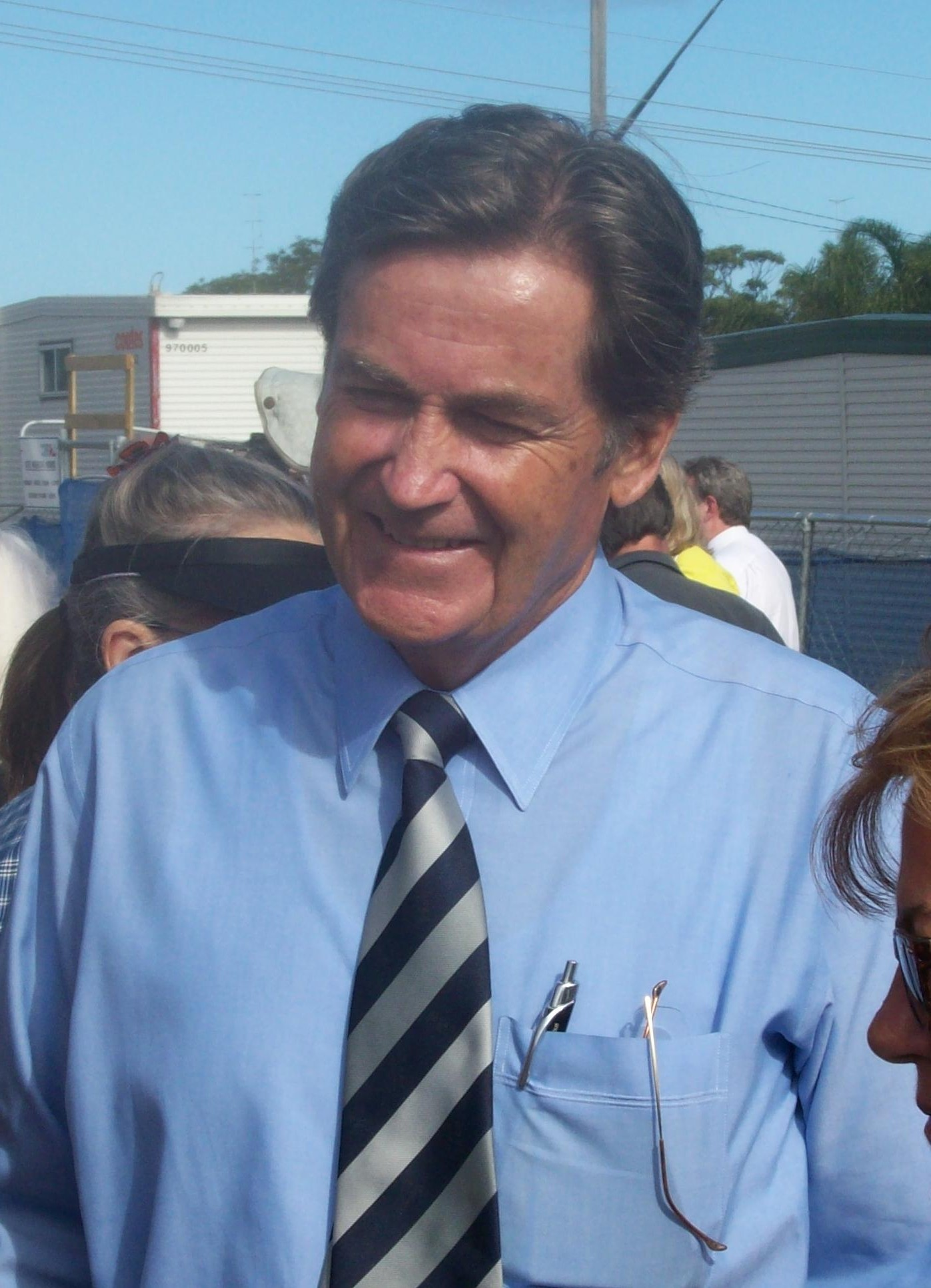

Minister for Gaming and Racing
- In office 2 April 2003 – 2 April 2007
- Premier: Bob Carr; Morris Iemma
- Preceded by: Michael Egan
- Succeeded by: Graham West

Minister for the Central Coast
- In office 1 February 2005 – 2 April 2007
- Premier: Bob Carr; Morris Iemma
- Preceded by: John Della Bosca (as Minister Assisting the Premier for the Central Coast)
- Succeeded by: John Della Bosca

Assistant Speaker of the New South Wales Legislative Assembly
- In office 8 May 2007 – 4 March 2011
- Preceded by: Alison Megarrity
- Succeeded by: Andrew Fraser

Member of the New South Wales Parliament for The Entrance
- In office 18 January 1992 – 26 March 2011
- Preceded by: Bob Graham
- Succeeded by: Chris Spence

Personal details
- Born: 29 December 1949
- Died: 12 February 2018 (aged 68) Wyong, New South Wales, Australia
- Party: Labor
- Children: 8 (including Emma McBride)
- Profession: Civil engineer

Grant Anthony McBride (29 December 1949 – 12 February 2018) was an Australian politician who was a member of the New South Wales Legislative Assembly representing the electorate of The Entrance on the New South Wales Central Coast for the Labor Party between 1992 and 2011.

== Political career ==
McBride won Australian Labor Party preselection for The Entrance in the 1991 state election, losing to Liberal incumbent Bob Graham by 116 votes. However, due to the late completion of the 1991 redistribution, hundreds of voters received absentee ballots for Gosford. As a result, the Court of Disputed Returns ordered a by-election for 1992, which was won by McBride.

In 2003, McBride was appointed Minister for Gaming and Racing and, in 2005, appointed Minister for the Central Coast. As Minister for Gaming and Racing, in 2005, he proposed a ban on Dutch beer Shag, claiming its name was offensive to Australians. McBride said the beer's name linked it, "directly with sexual intercourse". McBride held both Ministerial positions until a controversy arose during 2006, when he was accused of wasting $50,000 on an overseas trip in November 2005. It was alleged that McBride was accompanied by former Gosford City Councillor, Daniel Cook and his former chief of staff (and son of former Police Minister Paul Whelan) John Whelan. Media reports of the incident suggested McBride had taken the trip knowing he might be removed from the Cabinet. McBride lost his position as Minister for Gaming and Racing and Minister for the Central Coast in April 2007.

In May 2007, McBride was appointed Assistant Speaker of the New South Wales Legislative Assembly. On 8 November 2010, McBride announced that he would not contest the 2011 state election.

== Personal life and death ==
McBride was a qualified engineer who worked as an electorate officer to former prime minister, Gough Whitlam. He was married and lived in The Entrance with his wife and eight children, and was an avowed teetotaller and non-gambler. His daughter, Emma McBride, is the current federal MP for Division of Dobell.

He died on 12 February 2018 from Alzheimer's disease at the age of 68. The ocean baths at The Entrance were named The Grant McBride Baths shortly after his death, in his honour.

New South Wales Legislative Assembly
Preceded by Bob Graham	Member for The Entrance; 1992–2011	Succeeded by Chris Spence
New title	Assistant Speaker of the Legislative Assembly; 2007–2011; Served alongside: Alison Megarrity	Succeeded by Andrew Fraser
Political offices
Preceded by Michael Egan	Minister for Gaming and Racing; 2003–2007	Succeeded by Graham West
Preceded by John Della Bosca	Minister for the Central Coast; 2005–2007	Succeeded by John Della Bosca
