= Bob Graham (New South Wales politician) =

Australian politician (born 1943)

Robert Leslie (Bob) Graham JP (born 19 May 1943) is an Australian politician. He was a Liberal Party member of the New South Wales Legislative Assembly from 1988 to 1991, representing the electorate of The Entrance.

Graham was elected to the Legislative Assembly at the 1988 state election, and ran for re-election at the 1991 election. He initially appeared to have won reelection over Labor challenger Grant McBride by 116 votes. However, due to the late completion of the 1991 redistribution, hundreds of voters received absentee ballots for Gosford. As a result, the Court of Disputed Returns ordered a by-election for 1992, which was won by McBride.

== Wyong Shire Council ==
Graham was elected to Wyong Shire Council as a Councillor for B Ward at the September 1999 election, and would be re-elected a further three times in 2004, 2008 and 2012. Served five terms as Mayor (2005–2007, 2008–2010, 2011–2012) and four terms as Deputy Mayor (1999–2000, 2002–2004, 2010–2011). Graham has been a Justice of the Peace (JP) since 1971.

New South Wales Legislative Assembly
New district	Member for The Entrance; 1988–1991	Succeeded by Grant McBride
Civic offices
Preceded by	Deputy Mayor of Wyong Shire; 1999–2000	Succeeded by
Preceded by Gregory Best	Deputy Mayor of Wyong Shire; 2002–2004	Succeeded by Neil Rose
Preceded by Brenton Pavier	Mayor of Wyong Shire; 2005–2007	Succeeded by Warren Welham
Preceded by Warren Welham	Mayor of Wyong Shire; 2008–2010	Succeeded by Doug Eaton
Preceded by Lisa Matthews	Deputy Mayor of Wyong Shire; 2010–2011	Succeeded by Sue Wynn
Preceded by Doug Eaton	Mayor of Wyong Shire; 2011–2012	Succeeded by Doug Eaton
