= Central Coast Football =

Governing body and football competition in New South Wales, Australia

- Formation: 1963
- Headquarters: Lisarow, New South Wales, Australia
- Parent organisation: Football NSW, FFA
- Website: Official Website

Central Coast Football is a governing body and football (soccer) competition located in the Central Coast region of New South Wales. Its administrative headquarters are based at Pluim Park, Lisarow, New South Wales. The association consists of a Premier League, a Division 1 and ten all ages competitions which correspond to tiers five to seventeen on the Australian soccer pyramid. Clubs are based all across the Central Coast.

== History ==
The Central Coast Soccer Association was formed in 1963 with the first year of top-flight competition in 1965. It was later changed to Central Coast Football as the use of the word 'football' replaces 'soccer' in Australia.

In January 2022, CCF announced that the association was disaffiliating with Football Australia and Football NSW. This is due to CCF believing that the FA and FNSW do not value CCF and don't invest in grassroots football on the Central Coast. This has led to CCF being essentially banned from Football Australia and Football NSW competitions.

In March 2022, following months of negotiation, Football Australia announced that CCF would remain as a member of the FIFA affiliated Australian football family. This allowed CCF clubs and players to participate in FNSW and FA competitions.

== Teams and structure ==
Central Coast Football is responsible for overseeing all men's, women's and junior's competitions. Ranging from small sided under 5's competitions to Premier league football and all the way up to over 45's men's football. They oversee over 15000 players, along with this they assist with the running of Central Coast Football Referees Branch, manage over 700 competitive fixtures a weekend with around 250 referees.

=== Tiers and Leagues ===
The Central Coast Premier League sits at the fifth tier of the Australian football league system, Division one sits at the sixth tier, while the ten all age divisions stretch from tiers 7 to 17.

Central Coast Premier League (MPL) operates with 10 teams playing an 18 round home & away season, with the bottom two teams being relegated every year down to Division one. The competition operates with a 'club championship', combining points totals from 1st grade, Reserve grade and 21's (third grade). First grade points are multiplied by four, reserve grade by two and 21's by 1. At the end of the season the top four teams in each grade (1st, Reserve & 21's) compete in their own respective finals series with the winner declared Champions. The team that finishes top of the table in each respective grade at the end of the season is declared as the premiers.

Division one is the second division of men's 1st grade football, with 10 clubs also playing an 18 round home & away season. The top two teams at the end of the season in the combined club championship achieve promotion to the Central Coast Premier League (MPL). Division one teams competes with only a First grade and Reserve competition, lacking the 21's as seen in MPL, this allows for smaller clubs to have the ability to compete in grade football. As with MPL division one has a finals series for the top 4 teams in both First and Reserve grade. The team that finishes top of the table in each respective grade at the end of the season is declared as the premiers.

[7]

Central Coast Women's Premier League (WPL) is the top division of women's football on the central coast sitting at the fourth tier of the Australian female football pyramid. During 2024 the competition runs as a 7 team competition, playing a 21 round home and away season, followed by the top 4 teams qualifying for the finals series with the winner being declared as champion. The team that finishes top of the table at the end of the season is declared as the premiers, unlike the men's reflective competitions the women's competition controversially is without a reserve grade leaving just the clubs first grade sides competing.

=== Teams ===
There are a total of 23 clubs competing across all CCF tiers and divisions.

Club	Nickname	Founded	Home ground
Avoca FC	Sharks	1995	Erina High School, Erina (Home); Paul Oval Holgate (Alternative ground); Fagan Park Point Clare (Alternative ground)
Barnstoneworth United Central Coast	Barnies	1997	Lisarow Sporting Precinct, Lisarow
Berkeley Vale SC	Wombats	1974	Kurraba Oval, Berkeley Vale (Home ) Chittaway Oval, Chittaway Bay (Alternative ground); Mingara Club Oval, Tumbi Umbi (Alternative ground)
Budgewoi FC	Budgies	1961	Budgewoi Soccer Oval, Budgewoi
Doyalson-Wyee SC	Wolves	1992	Doyalson RSL Oval, Doyalson
East Gosford FC	Rams	1963	Hylton Moore Oval, East Gosford
Gosford City	Dragons	1963	Gavenlock Oval, Narara
Gwandalan-Summerland Point FC	Cobras	1997	Tunkawallin Oval, Gwandalan
Kanwal-Warnervale FC	Bulls	1977	Wadalba Sports Complex, Kanwal (Home); Kanwal Oval, Kanwal (Alternative)
Kariong United	Cougars	1990	Kariong Oval, Kariong
Killarney District	Terriers	1972	Edsacc Oval, Bateau Bay
Kincumber FC	Roos	1984	Frost Reserve, Kincumber
Mountain District	Mountain Devils	1978	Bloodtree Oval, Mangrove Mountain
Ourimbah United	Falcons	1982	Ourimbah Oval, Ourimbah
Southern & Ettalong United	Lions	1985	James Brown Oval, Woy Woy
Terrigal United		1967	Duffys Oval, Terrigal; Eastern Road Oval Killarney Vale (Alternative ground)
The Entrance Bateau Bay FC	Reddies	1952	Pat Morley Oval, Bateau Bay
Toukley-Gorokan SC	Gunners	1964	Harry Moore Oval, Toukley
Umina United	Eagles	1980	Umina Oval, Umina
Woongarrah FC	Wildcats	2010	Hamlyn Terrace Oval, Warnervale
Woy Woy FC	Roosters	1966	Austin Butler Oval, Woy Woy
Wyoming FC	Tigers	1970	Alan Davidson Oval, Wyoming
Wyong FC	Emus	1965	Baker Park, Wyong

Defunct Teams

Club	Founded	Defunct	Notes
Avoca Beach	1973	1977	
Avoca Davistown	1978	1980	
Blacksmiths	1968		
Blackwall	1970	1979	Amalgamated with Umina to form Umina United in 1981
Brisbania	1963	1970	Foundation Club
Catherine Hill Bay	1958	?	
Central Coast United	1967	1982	Played in Newcastle Competitions
Coast United	1952	1955	
Davistown Rangers	1971	1985	
Doyalson	1972	1979	
Doyalson RSL	1978	1982	Played in Newcastle Competitions
Ettalong Beach	1963	1984	Amalgamated with Southern United to form Southern & Ettalong United in 1985
Gosford	1952	1963	
Gosford Rangers	1976	1982	Played in Newcastle Competitions
Gosford Rovers	1956	?	
Gosford/Ourimbah	1954		

Club	Founded	Defunct	Notes
Gwandalan	1973		Reformed as Gwandalan-Summerland Point FC in 1997
Lakes United	1972		
Long Jetty	1957		
Milson Island	1955	1956	
Mt Penang	1965	1977	
Narara Wyoming	1966	1970	
Saratoga	1955		
Springfield Rockets	1970	1979	
Southern United	1972	1984	Amalgamated with Ettalong Beach to form Southern & Ettalong United in 1985
Superior Plaster	1974		
Swansea United	1983	1995	Invited from NNSW, now play in Zone Premier League
The Entrance Rovers	1958	?	
Tuggerah United	2000	2022	
Woy Woy Rovers	1952	1953	
Woy Woy St Johns	1964	1965	
Woy Woy United	1952	?	

== Competing Premier League Clubs in 2026 ==
=== Mens Premier League Clubs in 2026 ===
Club	Home Ground	2025 Standing
Berkeley Vale	Mingara Club Oval, Tumbi Umbi	3rd (MPL)
Budgewoi FC	Budgewoi Soccer Oval, Budgewoi	1st (MPL)
Gosford City	Gavenlock Oval, Narara	2nd (Div 1)
Kanwal Warnervale	Wadalba Sports Complex, Kanwal	4th (MPL)
Killarney District	Edsacc Oval, Bateau Bay	6th (MPL)
Ourimbah United	Ourimbah Oval, Ourimbah	7th (MPL)
Southern and Ettalong United	James Browne Oval, Woy Woy	2nd (MPL)
Terrigal United	Duffy's Oval. Terrigal	8th (MPL)
Umina United	Umina Oval, Umina	1st (Div 1)
Wyoming FC	Alan Davidson Oval, Wyoming	(9th (MPL)

=== Womens Premier League Clubs in 2026 ===
Club	Home Ground(s)	2025 Standing
East Gosford FC	Hylton Moore Oval, East Gosford	2nd (WPL)
Kanwal Warnervale	Wadalba Sports Complex, Kanwal	6th (WPL)
Killarney District	Edsacc Oval, Bateau Bay	1st (WPL)
Kincumber FC	Frost Reserve, Kincumber	3rd(WPL)
Southern and Ettalong United	James Browne Oval, Woy Woy	8th (WPL)
Terrigal United	Duffy's Oval. Terrigal	7th (WPL)
The Entrance Bateau Bay FC	Pat Morley Oval, Bateau Bay	5th (WPL)
Umina United	Umina Oval, Umina	4th (WPL)

== Honours ==
Year	League Champions	Grand Final Premiers	Cup Winners
1965	Wyong SC	–	–
1966	Umina United	Brisbania SC	–
1967	Wyong SC	Narara Wyoming SC	–
1968	The Entrance	The Entrance	–
1969	Ettalong Beach	Ettalong Beach	–
1970	Budgewoi FC	Budgewoi FC	–
1971	Ettalong Beach	Woy Woy FC	–
1972	The Entrance	Budgewoi FC	–
1973	Southern United	Southern United	–
1974	Southern United	Southern United	–
1975	Wyoming FC	Wyoming FC	Southern United
1976	Wyoming FC	Wyoming FC	Southern United
1977	Wyoming FC	Wyong SC	Southern United
1978	Wyoming FC	Wyoming FC	Southern United
1979	Wyong SC	Wyoming FC	Southern United
1980	Wyong SC	Wyong SC	Wyong SC
1981	Umina United	Umina United	Wyong SC
1982	Toukley Gorokan FC	Umina United	East Gosford FC
1983	Umina United	Wyong SC	Wyong SC
1984	Wyong SC	Umina United	Umina United
1985	Wyong SC	Wyong SC	Wyong SC
1986	East Gosford FC	Umina United	Woy Woy FC
1987	Swansea United	East Gosford FC	Budgewoi FC
1988	Budgewoi FC	Umina United	Southern & Ettalong
1989	The Entrance	The Entrance	The Entrance
1990	Southern & Ettalong	Wyong SC	Umina United
1991	The Entrance	Southern & Ettalong	Ourimbah United
1992	Southern & Ettalong	Southern & Ettalong	The Entrance
1993	Wyong SC	Wyong SC	Wyong SC
1994	Wyong SC	Wyong SC	Gosford City
1995	Umina United	Gosford City	Southern & Ettalong
1996	Wyong SC	Gosford City	Gosford City
1997	Umina United	Southern & Ettalong	The Entrance
1998	The Entrance	Ourimbah United	Ourimbah United
1999	Wyong SC	Wyong SC	Killarney District
2000	Umina United	Umina United	–
2001	Ourimbah United	Ourimbah United	Ourimbah United
2002	Umina United	East Gosford FC	Ourimbah United
2003	Umina United	Killarney District	Umina United
2004	East Gosford FC	Wyoming FC	Berkeley Vale SC
2005	The Entrance	The Entrance	The Entrance
2006	Umina United	Umina United	Southern & Ettalong
2007	Wyoming FC	Wyoming FC	The Entrance
2008	Budgewoi FC	Umina United	Budgewoi FC
2009	Berkeley Vale SC	Wyoming FC	Budgewoi FC
2010	The Entrance	The Entrance	Berkeley Vale SC
2011	Berkeley Vale SC	Umina United	East Gosford FC
2012	Berkeley Vale SC	Wyoming FC	Berkeley Vale SC
2013	Killarney District	Wyoming FC	Budgewoi FC
2014	Wyoming FC	The Entrance	Wyoming FC
2015	Gosford City	The Entrance	The Entrance
2016	Killarney District	Killarney District	Killarney District
2017	Killarney District	Killarney District	– Not Held
2018	Killarney District	Killarney District	– Not Held
2019	Killarney District	Killarney District	– Not Held
2020	Killarney District	Terrigal United FC	– Not Held
2021	– N/A (Abandoned due to Covid-19)	– N/A (Abandoned due to Covid-19)	Terrigal United FC
2022	Killarney District	Terrigal United FC	Berkeley Vale SC
2023	Killarney District	Killarney District	Southern & Ettalong United
2024	Woongarrah	Berkeley Vale	Berkeley Vale SC
2025	Budegewoi FC	Southern & Ettalong United	Woongarrah
2026			Berkeley Vale SC

Club	Champions	Premiers	Cup Winners	Total	Most Recent Trophy	Best Cup Finish
Berkeley Vale	3	1	6	10	2026 Association Cup	R5
Brisbania†	0	1	0	1	1966 Premiership	N/A
Budgewoi	4	2	4	10	2025 Premiership	R4
East Gosford	2	2	2	6	2011 Association Cup	R4
Ettalong Beach†	1	2	0	3	1971 Championship	N/A
Gosford City	1	2	2	5	2015 Championship	R5
Killarney District	8	6	2	16	2023 Premiership	R6
Narara Wyoming†	0	1	0	1	1967 Premiership	N/A
Ourimbah United	1	2	4	7	2002 Association Cup	R3
Southern and Ettalong United	2	4	4	10	2023 Association Cup	R5
Southern United†	2	2	5	9	1979 Association Cup	N/A
Terrigal United	0	2	1	3	2022 Premiership	R5
The Entrance-Bateau Bay	7	6	6	19	2015 Premiership	R5
Toukley Gorokan	1	0	0	1	1982 Championship	R3
Woongarrah	1	0	1	2	2025 Association Cup	
Woy Woy	0	1	1	2	1986 Association Cup	
Wyoming	6	9	1	16	2014 Championship	
Wyong SC/FC	10	8	5	23	1999 Premiership	

== Performance in FFA Cup/Australia Cup ==
Season	Round	Club	Home team (tier)	Score	Away team (tier)	Notes
2014	Preliminary R1	East Gosford	Ararat (7)	2–1	East Gosford (6)	
2014	Preliminary R1	Entrance Bateau Bay	Hills Pumas (6)	4–1	Entrance Bateau Bay (6)	
2014	Preliminary R1	Berkeley Vale	Arncliffe Aurora (6)	2–1	Berkeley Vale (6)	
2014	Preliminary R1	Kincumber Roos	Rydalmere Lions (5)	5–1	Kincumber Roos (6)	
2015	Preliminary R3	Southern and Ettalong United	Woonona FC (6)	2–1†	Southern and Ettalong United (6)	Woonona advanced in extra time
2015	Preliminary R3	Berkeley Vale	Berkeley Vale (6)	1–3	Granville Rage (4)	
2015	Preliminary R4	Gosford City	Bankstown Sports Strikers (6)	1–6	Gosford City (6)	
2015	Preliminary R4	Entrance Bateau Bay	Pittwater RSL (6)	1–1†	Entrance Bateau Bay (6)	Entrance advanced on penalties
2015	Preliminary R5	Gosford City	Gosford City (6)	1–2	Macarthur Rams (3)	
2015	Preliminary R5	Entrance Bateau Bay	Kenthurst and District (6)	2–1	Entrance Bateau Bay (6)	
2016	Preliminary R3	Southern and Ettalong United	Southern and Ettalong United (6)	5–2	FC Gazy Auburn (5)	
2016	Preliminary R3	Woy Woy FC	Carss Park FC (7)	2–1	Woy Woy FC (7)	
2016	Preliminary R3	Killarney Districts	Killarney Districts (6)	4–2	Stanmore Hawks (4)	
2016	Preliminary R3	Umina United	Melrose FC (8)	0–8	Umina United (6)	
2016	Preliminary R3	Doyalson Wyee SC	Hurstville City Minotaurs (5)	5–0	Doyalson Wyee SC (7)	
2016	Preliminary R3	Berkeley Vale	Greenacre Eagles (7)	0–7	Berkeley Vale (6)	
2016	Preliminary R3	Kanwal Warnervale Rovers	Western Condors (5)	3–2	Kanwal Warnervale Rovers (7)	
2016	Preliminary R3	Gosford City	Gosford City (6)	10–2	Oatley RSL (6)	
2016	Preliminary R3	Ourimbah United	The Ponds SC (6)	3–2	Ourimbah United (7)	
2016	Preliminary R4	Southern and Ettalong United	Southern and Ettalong United (6)	4–8	Dulwich Hill (4)	
2016	Preliminary R4	Killarney Districts	Gosford City (6)	3–4	Killarney Districts (6)	
2016	Preliminary R4	Umina United	Umina United (6)	0–2	Bankstown Berries (3)	
2016	Preliminary R4	Berkeley Vale	Berkeley Vale (6)	1–0	Glenmore Park (8)	
2016	Preliminary R4	Gosford City	Gosford City (6)	3–4	Killarney Districts (6)	
2016	Preliminary R4	Entrance Bateau Bay	Entrance Bateau Bay (6)	6–1	Maroubra United (6)	
2016	Preliminary R5	Killarney Districts	Mt Druitt Town Rangers (3)	2–4†	Killarney Districts (6)	Killarney advanced in extra time
2016	Preliminary R5	Berkeley Vale	St George Warriors (5)	2–1	Berkeley Vale (6)	
2016	Preliminary R5	Entrance Bateau Bay	Entrance Bateau Bay (6)	0–5	Hawkesbury City (4)	
2016	Preliminary R6	Killarney Districts	Manly United (2)	4–1	Killarney Districts (6)	
2017	Preliminary R3	Gosford City	Marayong FC (6)	2–6†	Gosford City (6)	Gosford advanced in extra time
2017	Preliminary R3	Entrance Bateau Bay	St George City (4)	5–0	Entrance Bateau Bay (6)	
2017	Preliminary R3	Woy Woy FC	Kirrawee Kangaroos (6)	8–1	Woy Woy FC (-)	
2017	Preliminary R3	Southern and Ettalong United	Southern and Ettalong United (6)	4–4	Amity FC (-)	Southern advanced on penalties
2017	Preliminary R3	Terrigal United	Kellyville Kolts (-)	5–1	Terrigal United (6)	
2017	Preliminary R3	East Gosford	Glenmore Park (-)	0–1	East Gosford (-)	
2017	Preliminary R3	Killarney Districts	Sydney Dragon (-)	3–8	Killarney Districts (6)	
2017	Preliminary R3	Ourimbah United	Ourimbah United (-)	w/o	Granville Rage (4)	
2017	Preliminary R3	Berkeley Vale	Berkeley Vale (-)	6–0	Penrith Rovers (-)	
2017	Preliminary R4	Gosford City	Gosford City (6)	2–4	Kemblawarra Fury (6)	
2017	Preliminary R4	Southern and Ettalong United	Western Condors (5)	1–2	Southern and Ettalong United (6)	
2017	Preliminary R4	East Gosford	Bankstown Berries (3)	2–0	East Gosford (6)	
2017	Preliminary R4	Killarney Districts	Killarney Districts (6)	3–2	Blacktown Spartans (3)	
2017	Preliminary R4	Berkeley Vale	Dunbar Rovers (6)	4–3†	Berkeley Vale (6)	Dunbar advanced in extra time
2017	Preliminary R5	Southern and Ettalong United	Parramatta FC (2)	3–0	Southern and Ettalong United (6)	
2017	Preliminary R5	Killarney Districts	Killarney Districts (6)	0–4	APIA Leichhardt (2)	
2018	Preliminary R2	Kariong United	Kariong United (7)	4–5	Hurstville Glory (-)	
2018	Preliminary R2	East Gosford	Putney Rangers (-)	0–1	East Gosford (6)	
2018	Preliminary R2	Wyoming FC	Tumut Eagles (-)	0–2	Wyoming FC (7)	
2018	Preliminary R2	Entrance Bateau Bay	Chatswood Rangers (-)	3–1	Entrance Bateau Bay (6)	
2018	Preliminary R2	Woongarrah Wildcats	Woongarrah Wildcats (7)	4–2	Phoenix FC (-)	
2018	Preliminary R2	Toukley Gorokan	The Ponds FC (-)	0–1	Toukley Gorokan (6)	
2018	Preliminary R3	East Gosford	East Gosford (6)	1–4	Nepean FC (5)	
2018	Preliminary R3	Wyoming FC	Central Coast United (5)	2–0	Wyoming FC (7)	
2018	Preliminary R3	Woongarrah Wildcats	Woongarrah Wildcats (7)	4–1	Sydney CBD FC (6)	
2018	Preliminary R3	Toukley Gorokan	Kenthurst and District (-)	5–1	Toukley Gorokan (6)	
2018	Preliminary R3	Woy Woy FC	Maroubra United (6)	5–1	Woy Woy FC (7)	
2018	Preliminary R3	Berkeley Vale	Berkeley Vale (6)	5–1	Hills Hawks FC (-)	
2018	Preliminary R3	Killarney District	Killarney District (6)	3–0	Doonside Hawks (-)	
2018	Preliminary R3	Terrigal United	Quakers Hill JSC (6)	0–6	Terrigal United (6)	
2018	Preliminary R3	Budgewoi FC	Budgewoi FC (7)	6–0	Tolland FC (-)	
2018	Preliminary R4	Woongarrah Wildcats	Bonnyrigg White Eagles (2)	6–1	Woongarrah Wildcats (7)	
2018	Preliminary R4	Berkeley Vale	Berkeley Vale (6)	6–0	Western NSW Mariners (4)	
2018	Preliminary R4	Killarney District	Epping Eastwood (6)	1–8	Killarney District (6)	
2018	Preliminary R4	Terrigal United	Sans Souci FC (-)	2–3	Terrigal United (6)	
2018	Preliminary R4	Budgewoi FC	Northern Tigers (3)	13–0	Budgewoi FC (7)	
2018	Preliminary R5	Berkeley Vale	Hawkesbury City (4)	2–1	Berkeley Vale (6)	
2018	Preliminary R5	Killarney District	Bomaderry SC (-)	1–1†	Killarney District (6)	Bomaderry advanced on penalties
2018	Preliminary R5	Terrigal United	Terrigal United (6)	0–2	Sydney Olympic (2)	
2019	Preliminary R2	Berkeley Vale	Berkeley Vale (6)	2–1	Holroyd Rangers (6)	
2019	Preliminary R2	Woongarrah Wildcats	Woongarrah Wildcats (6)	5–0	Macquarie University (7)	
2019	Preliminary R3	Berkeley Vale	Marayong FC (6)	1–7	Berkeley Vale (6)	
2019	Preliminary R3	Budgewoi FC	Coledale Waves (8)	3–1	Budgewoi FC (7)	
2019	Preliminary R3	Doyalson-Wyee	Pennant Hills (6)	13–0	Doyalson-Wyee (7)	
2019	Preliminary R3	Gwandalan Summerland Point	Gwandalan Summerland Point (7)	2–1	Shoalhaven United (7)	
2019	Preliminary R3	Kanwal Warnervale Rovers	Kanwal Warnervale Rovers (6)	0–4	UNSW (5)	
2019	Preliminary R3	Kariong United	Lindfield FC (6)	2–0	Kariong United (7)	
2019	Preliminary R3	Killarney District	Killarney District (6)	3–2	Albion Park White Eagles (6)	
2019	Preliminary R3	Southern & Ettalong	Abbotsford Juniors (6)	3–2	Southern & Ettalong (6)	
2019	Preliminary R3	Terrigal United	Pagewood Botany (6)	1–3	Terrigal United (6)	
2019	Preliminary R3	Umina United	Umina United (7)	2–1	Epping Eastwood (6)	
2019	Preliminary R3	Woongarrah Wildcats	Dulwich Hill (4)	4–0	Woongarrah Wildcats (6)	
2019	Preliminary R3	Woy Woy	Woy Woy (7)	1–2	Gerringong Breakers (6)	
2019	Preliminary R3	Wyoming FC	Wyoming FC (6)	1–5	Bulli FC (6)	
2019	Preliminary R4	Berkeley Vale	Berkeley Vale (6)	1–3	APIA Leichhardt Tigers (2)	
2019	Preliminary R4	Gwandalan Summerland Point	North Shore Mariners (3)	7–0	Gwandalan Summerland Point (7)	
2019	Preliminary R4	Killarney District	Lugarno FC (7)	1–7	Killarney District (6)	
2019	Preliminary R4	Terrigal United	Terrigal United (6)	2–3	Blacktown City (2)	
2019	Preliminary R4	Umina United	Umina United (7)	2–1	Forest Killarney (7)	
2019	Preliminary R5	Killarney District	Hazelbrook FC (6)	2–2†	Killarney District (6)	Hazelbrook advance on penalties
2019	Preliminary R5	Umina United	Umina United (7)	0–3	Pittwater RSL (6)	
