= 2018 FFA Cup preliminary rounds =

Qualification rounds for 2018 season of Australian soccer competition

Tournament details
- Country: Australia
- Teams: 781

The 2018 FFA Cup preliminary rounds was the qualifying competition to decide 21 of the 32 teams which took part in the 2018 FFA Cup Round of 32, along with the 10 A-League clubs and reigning National Premier Leagues champion, Heidelberg United. The preliminary rounds operated within a consistent national structure whereby club entry into the competition was staggered in each federation, with the winning clubs from Round 7 of the preliminary rounds in each member federation gaining entry into the Round of 32. All Australian clubs were eligible to enter the qualifying process through their respective FFA member federation, however only one team per club was permitted entry in the competition.

== Schedule ==
The number of fixtures for each round, and the match dates for each Federation, were as follows.

Round	Number of fixtures	Clubs	ACT	NSW	NNSW	NT	QLD	SA	TAS	VIC	WA
Qualifying round	32 + 11 byes	781 → 749	–	–	–	–	–	–	–	10–17 Feb	–
First round	57 + 16 byes	749 → 692	–	–	24 Feb–14 Mar	–	28 Feb–24 Mar	–	–	23–25 Feb	–
Second round	171 + 80 byes	692 → 521	–	9–13 Mar	23 Feb–15 Apr	–	15 Feb–11 Apr	22–28 Mar	–	2–6 Mar	11–18 Mar
Third round	189 + 4 byes	521 → 332	18 Mar–3 Apr	14–28 Mar	24 Mar–21 Apr	27 Mar–17 Apr	10 Mar–22 Apr	9–14 Apr	3 Mar	8–11 Mar	23–29 Mar
Fourth round	154 + 2 byes	332 → 178	18 Apr–1 May	3–11 Apr	1–12 May	1–8 May	17 Mar–25 Apr	25 Apr	2 Apr	17 Mar–2 Apr	2 Apr
Fifth round	83 + 1 bye	178 → 95	15–31 May	2–9 May	13–16 May	9–22 May	24 Mar–22 May	5 May	28–29 Apr	11–24 Apr	25 Apr
Sixth round	42	95 → 53	5–7 Jun	15–23 May	9 Jun	5 Jun	5 May–5 Jun	22–23 May	19 May	1–9 May	19–20 May
Seventh round	21	53 → 32	16 Jun	30 May	13 Jun	23 Jun	9–10 Jun	11 Jun	11 Jun	23–30 May	4 Jun

- Some round dates in respective Federations overlap due to separate scheduling of zones.

== Format ==
The preliminary rounds structures were as follows, and refer to the different levels in the unofficial Australian soccer league system :

- Qualifying round:

- 9 Queensland clubs level 4 and below entered this stage.
- 66 Victorian clubs level 7 and below entered this stage.

- First round:

- 19 Northern NSW clubs level 4 and below entered this stage.
- 16 Queensland clubs (7 from the previous round and 9 level 4–5) entered this stage.
- 95 Victorian clubs (36 from the previous round and 59 level 6–7) entered this stage.

- Second round:

- 120 New South Wales clubs level 6 and below entered this stage.
- 60 Northern NSW clubs (16 from the previous round and 34 level 4 and below) entered this stage.
- 83 Queensland clubs (9 from the previous round and 74 level 4 and below) entered this stage.
- 42 South Australian clubs level 3 and below entered this stage.
- 84 Victorian clubs (48 from the previous round and 36 level 5–6) entered this stage.
- 32 Western Australian clubs level 5 and below entered this stage. For matches where the scores were equal at full-time, they went straight to penalties.

- Third round:

- 14 Australian Capital Territory clubs level 3 and below entered this stage.
- 114 New South Wales clubs (88 from the previous round and 26 level 4–5) entered this stage.
- 42 Northern NSW clubs (31 from the previous round and 11 level 3) entered this stage.
- 8 Northern Territory clubs level 2 and below entered this stage.
- 58 Queensland clubs (52 from the previous round and 6 level 4) entered this stage.
- 32 South Australian clubs (21 from the previous round and 11 level 2) entered this stage.
- 12 Tasmanian clubs level 3 entered this stage.
- 66 Victorian clubs (42 from the previous round and 24 level 4) entered this stage.
- 32 Western Australian clubs (16 from the previous round and 22 level 3–4) entered this stage.

- Fourth round:

- 16 Australian Capital Territory clubs (7 from the previous round and 9 level 2) entered this stage.
- 80 New South Wales clubs (57 from the previous round and 23 level 2–3) entered this stage.
- 31 Northern NSW clubs (21 from the previous round and 10 level 2) entered this stage.
- 5 Northern Territory clubs progressed to this stage.
- 50 Queensland clubs (31 from the previous round and 19 level 2–3) entered this stage.
- 16 South Australian clubs progressed to this stage.
- 16 Tasmanian clubs (6 from the previous round and 10 level 2–3) entered this stage.
- 64 Victorian clubs (33 from the previous round and 31 level 2–3) entered this stage.
- 32 Western Australian clubs (19 from the previous round and 13 level 2) entered this stage.

- Fifth round:

- 8 Australian Capital Territory clubs progressed to this stage.
- 40 New South Wales clubs progressed to this stage.
- 16 Northern New South Wales clubs progressed to this stage.
- 7 Northern Territory clubs (3 from the previous round and 4 clubs from the Alice Springs zone) entered this stage.
- 32 Queensland clubs (25 from the previous round and 7 level 2) entered this stage.
- 8 South Australian clubs progressed to this stage.
- 8 Tasmanian clubs progressed to this stage.
- 32 Victorian clubs progressed to this stage.
- 16 Western Australian clubs progressed to this stage.

- Sixth round:

- 4 Australian Capital Territory clubs progressed to this stage, and also got a home fixture when they entered the 2019 FFA Cup preliminary rounds.
- 20 New South Wales progressed to this stage.
- 8 Northern New South Wales clubs progressed to this stage.
- 4 Northern Territory clubs progressed to this stage.
- 16 Queensland clubs progressed to this stage.
- 4 South Australian clubs progressed to this stage.
- 4 Tasmanian clubs progressed to this stage.
- 16 Victorian clubs progressed to this stage.
- 8 Western Australian clubs progressed to this stage.

- Seventh round:

- 2 Australian Capital Territory clubs progressed to this stage, which doubled as the Final of the Federation Cup.
- 10 New South Wales clubs progressed to this stage. The 5 winners also participated in the final rounds of the Waratah Cup.
- 4 Northern New South Wales clubs progressed to this stage.
- 2 Northern Territory clubs progressed to this stage – the winners of the Darwin-based and Alice Springs-based knockout competitions – which doubled as the final of the Sport Minister's Cup.
- 8 Queensland clubs progressed to this stage.
- 2 South Australian clubs progressed to this stage, which doubled as the Grand Final of the Federation Cup.
- 2 Tasmanian clubs progressed to this stage, which doubled as the Grand Final of the Milan Lakoseljac Cup.
- 8 Victorian clubs progressed to this stage. The 4 winners, plus Heidelberg United, also qualified to the final rounds of the Dockerty Cup.
- 4 Western Australian clubs progressed to this stage. The 2 winners also played in the Final of the Football West State Cup.

=== Other qualification issues ===
- A-League Youth teams playing in their respective federation leagues are specifically excluded from the preliminary rounds as their respective Senior A-League clubs are already part of the competition.
- Heidelberg United did not participate in the Victorian qualifying rounds, as they already qualified into the FFA Cup as 2017 National Premier Leagues champions.

== Key to abbreviations ==
Federation	Zone
ACT = Australian Capital Territory	
NSW = New South Wales	
NNSW = Northern New South Wales	FNC = Far North Coast; MNC = Mid North Coast; NC = North Coast; NI = Northern Inland; NTH = North (generally); STH = South
NT = Northern Territory	ASP = Alice Springs; DAR = Darwin
QLD = Queensland	BNE = Brisbane; CQ = Central Queensland; FNQ = Far North Queensland; GC = Gold Coast; MRF = Mackay Regional Football; NQ = North Queensland; SC = Sunshine Coast; SQL = South Queensland (generally); SWQ = South West Queensland; WB = Wide Bay
SA = South Australia	
TAS = Tasmania	
VIC = Victoria	
WA = Western Australia	

== Qualifying round ==
Fed	Zone	Tie no	Home team (Tier)	Score	Away team (Tier)
Queensland
QLD	SC	1	Beerwah Glasshouse United (4)	0–1	Buderim Wanderers (4)
QLD	SC	2	Caloundra FC (4)	6–3	Noosa Lions (4)
Victoria
VIC	–	3	Old Trinity Grammarians (8)	3–0	Meadow Park (8)
VIC	–	4	White Star Dandenong (8)	0–7	Chelsea FC (8)
VIC	–	5	Thornbury Athletic (8)	3–2	Casey Panthers (8)
VIC	–	6	Rowville Eagles (8)	0–2	Glenroy Lions (8)
VIC	–	7	Victoria Park (10)	0–5	Knox United (8)
VIC	–	8	Mildura City (10)	3–4	Yarra Jets (8)
VIC	–	9	Endeavour Hills (8)	w/o	Buninyong Redbacks (10)
VIC	–	10	Cobram Roar (9)	1–5	Boronia SC (8)
VIC	–	11	Pakenham United (8)	0–4	Keilor Wolves (8)
VIC	–	12	Bundoora United (8)	2–0	East Kew (8)
VIC	–	13	Barwon SC (8)	2–1	Mitchell Rangers (8)
VIC	–	14	West Point (8)	2–1	Maidstone United (8)
West Point removed for fielding ineligible players.
VIC	–	15	Deakin Ducks (8)	1–3	Tatura SC (9)
VIC	–	16	Drouin Dragons (8)	0–5	Heidelberg Eagles (8)

Fed	Zone	Tie no	Home team (Tier)	Score	Away team (Tier)
VIC	–	17	Reservoir Yeti (8)	3–2†	Alphington SC (8)
VIC	–	18	Bunyip District (8)	4–3†	East Bentleigh (8)
VIC	–	19	Keon Park (8)	1–7	Gisborne SC (8)
VIC	–	20	Myrtleford Savoy (9)	w/o	Westside Strikers (8)
VIC	–	21	Melbourne Lions (8)	w/o	Monash SC (9)
VIC	–	22	Old Mentonians (8)	2–3	Somerville Eagles (8)
VIC	–	23	Wangaratta City (9)	17–0	Swinburne FC (8)
VIC	–	24	Falcons 2000 (9)	2–3	Mount Waverley City (8)
VIC	–	25	Maribyrnong Greens (8)	1–0	Forest Rangers (9)
VIC	–	26	Brunswick Zebras (7)	w/o	Fortuna 60 (9)
VIC	–	27	Twin City Wanderers (9)	8–2	Old Ivanhoe Grammarians (8)
VIC	–	28	Aspendale SC (8)	4–0	Warrnambool Wolves (9)
VIC	–	29	Glen Eira FC (12)	1–7	Melton Phoenix (8)
VIC	–	30	Waverley Wanderers (8)	w/o	Campbellfield Lions (8)
VIC	–	31	Glen Waverley (8)	2–0	Monash City (8)
VIC	–	32	Lara United (8)	8–3	Kensington City (8)

Notes

- w/o = Walkover
- † = After Extra Time
- QLD Byes – Bribie Island Tigers (5), Gympie United (4), Kawana Force (4), Maroochydore Swans (4) and Woombye Snakes (4).
- VIC Byes – Albert Park (8), Ballarat North United (10), Lyndale United (8), Moonee Valley Knights (8), Mt Lilydale Old Collegians (8) and Uni Hill Eagles (8).

== First round ==
Fed	Zone	Tie no	Home team (Tier)	Score	Away team (Tier)
Northern New South Wales
NNSW	MNC	1	Wallis Lake (4)	4–1	Tuncurry Forster (4)
NNSW	NC	2	Maclean FC (4)	0–1	Northern Storm Thunder (4)
NNSW	NC	3	Grafton United (5)	0–6	Coffs Coast Tigers (4)
Queensland
QLD	FNQ	4	Leichhardt Lions (4)	6–2	Douglas United (5)
QLD	FNQ	5	Mareeba United (4)	3–3†	Marlin Coast Rangers (4)
Marlin Coast Rangers advance 5–4 on penalties.
QLD	FNQ	6	Innisfail United (4)	5–2	Edge Hill United (4)
QLD	FNQ	7	Southside Comets (4)	15–0	JCU Cairns FC (5)
QLD	SC	8	Bribie Island Tigers (5)	0–8	Woombye Snakes (4)
QLD	SC	9	Caloundra FC (4)	5–2	Gympie United (4)
QLD	SC	10	Kawana Force (4)	0–1†	Maroochydore Swans (4)
Victoria
VIC	–	11	Point Cook (6)	4–1	Bundoora United (8)
VIC	–	12	East Brighton United (7)	7–3	Surf Coast (7)
VIC	–	13	Upfield (6)	2–3	Sebastopol Vikings (6)
VIC	–	14	Waverley Wanderers (8)	2–0	Middle Park (6)
VIC	–	15	Sandown Lions (7)	3–2	Knox United (8)
VIC	–	16	Yarra Jets (8)	6–1	Hampton Park United Sparrows (7)
VIC	–	17	Endeavour United (7)	0–2	Ashburton United (7)
VIC	–	18	Darebin United (7)	5–3	Barwon (8)
VIC	–	19	Lara United (8)	w/o	Keysborough SC (7)
VIC	–	20	RMIT (7)	2–1	Aspendale SC (8)
VIC	–	21	Chisholm United (7)	0–3	Noble Park United (6)
VIC	–	22	Fawkner SC (6)	2–5	Brunswick Zebras (7)
VIC	–	23	Myrtleford Savoy (9)	w/o	Riversdale SC (7)
VIC	–	24	Altona North (7)	0–1	Monash University (7)
VIC	–	25	Sandringham (7)	1–2	Melton Phoenix (8)
VIC	–	26	Bell Park (7)	1–0	Dandenong South (7)
VIC	–	27	Chelsea FC (8)	3–4	Old Xaverians (7)
VIC	–	28	Healesville SC (7)	4–2	Bunyip District (8)

Fed	Zone	Tie no	Home team (Tier)	Score	Away team (Tier)
VIC	–	29	Ringwood City (7)	1–0	Greenvale United (7)
VIC	–	30	West Preston (7)	3–0	Monash SC (9)
VIC	–	31	Lyndale United (8)	0–3	Marcellin Old Collegians (7)
VIC	–	32	Glenroy Lions (8)	5–1	Maidstone United (8)
VIC	–	33	Moonee Valley Knights (8)	1–2	Keilor Wolves (8)
VIC	–	34	Wangaratta City (9)	3–1	Collingwood City (6)
VIC	–	35	Laverton FC (7)	4–0	Noble Park (7)
VIC	–	36	Croydon City Arrows (7)	0–2	Heidelberg Eagles (8)
VIC	–	37	Northern Falcons (7)	2–0	Kings Domain (7)
VIC	–	38	Old Trinity Grammarians (8)	1–3	Dandenong Warriors (7)
VIC	–	39	Ballarat North United (10)	0–4	Watsonia Heights (7)
VIC	–	40	Lalor United (7)	5–0	Twin City Wanderers (9)
VIC	–	41	Western Eagles (7)	2–0	Melbourne University (7)
VIC	–	42	Whitehorse United (6)	4–0	Boronia (8)
VIC	–	43	Newmarket Phoenix (7)	w/o	Reservoir Yeti (8)
VIC	–	44	Springvale City (7)	3–0	Baxter SC (7)
VIC	–	45	Dingley Stars (6)	6–0	Golden Plains (7)
VIC	–	46	Harrisfield Hurricanes (7)	w/o	Melbourne City SC (7)
VIC	–	47	Glen Waverley (8)	1–7	Truganina Hornets (7)
VIC	–	48	St Kevins Old Boys (7)	3–1	Gisborne SC (8)
VIC	–	49	Old Camberwell Grammarians (7)	0–1	Elwood City (7)
VIC	–	50	Thornbury Athletic (8)	1–2	Mount Lilydale Old Collegians (8)
VIC	–	51	Tatura SC (9)	6–2	Maribyrnong Greens (8)
VIC	–	52	Sunbury United (6)	1–2	Spring Hills (7)
VIC	–	53	Plenty Valley Lions (7)	w/o	Bayside Argonauts (6)
Walkover for Bayside Argonauts – Plenty Valley Lions removed.
VIC	–	54	Somerville Eagles (8)	3–2†	Balmoral (7)
VIC	–	55	Uni Hill Eagles (8)	w/o	Craigieburn City (7)
Walkover for Craigieburn City – Uni Hill Eagles removed.
VIC	–	56	Albert Park (8)	0–3	North Melbourne Athletic (7)
VIC	–	57	Buninyong Redbacks (10)	1–8	Boroondara-Carey Eagles (6)

Notes

- w/o = Walkover
- † = After Extra Time
- NNSW Byes – Boambee Bombers (4), Coffs City United (4), Kempsey Saints (4), Macleay Valley Rangers (4), Orara Valley (4), Port Saints (4), Port United (-), Sawtell Scorpions (4), Taree Wildcats (4), Urunga FC (4), Wallamba FC (-), Wauchope Axemen (4) and Westlawn Tigers (4).
- QLD Byes – Buderim Wanderers (4) and Stratford Dolphins (4).
- VIC Bye – Mount Waverley City (8).

== Second round ==
Fed	Zone	Tie no	Home team (Tier)	Score	Away team (Tier)
New South Wales
NSW	–	1	Sydney CBD FC (-)	2–1†	Strathfield FC (-)
NSW	–	2	Glebe Gorillas (-)	5–2	Sydney Dragon (-)
NSW	–	3	Coptic United (-)	1–2	Sydney North West (-)
NSW	–	4	Leeton United (-)	0–1	North Ryde (-)
NSW	–	5	Arncliffe Aurora (-)	2–3	Carlton Rovers (-)
NSW	–	6	Kariong United (-)	4–5	Hurstville Glory (-)
NSW	–	7	Coogee United (-)	1–2	Bulli FC (-)
NSW	–	8	Parramatta City (-)	1–3	Harrington United (-)
NSW	–	9	Putney Rangers (-)	0–1	East Gosford (-)
NSW	–	10	Menai Hawks (-)	0–1	Cronulla Seagulls (-)
NSW	–	11	Tumut Eagles (-)	0–2	Wyoming FC (-)
NSW	–	12	Auburn FC (-)	w/o	Port Kembla (-)
NSW	–	13	Ararat FC (-)	1–4	Revesby Workers (-)
NSW	–	14	Kirrawee Kangaroos (-)	3–0	North Epping Rangers (-)
NSW	–	15	Chatswood Rangers (-)	3–1	The Entrance Bateau Bay (-)
NSW	–	16	Glenmore Park (-)	1–2	St Patrick's FC (-)
NSW	–	17	Abbotsford FC (-)	3–0	Sydney Rangers (-)
NSW	–	18	Mosman FC (-)	w/o	APIA Leichhardt Tigers Juniors (-)
NSW	–	19	Norwest FC (-)	0–13	Wollongong Olympic (-)
NSW	–	20	Blue Mountains FC (-)	5–1	Mt Annan Mustangs (-)
NSW	–	21	Glebe Wanderers (-)	2–1	Yagoona Lions (-)
NSW	–	22	Central Sydney Wolves (-)	3–3†	Winston Hills FC (-)
Central Sydney Wolves advance 5–4 on penalties.
NSW	–	23	Waverley Old Boys (-)	6–1	Hornsby Heights (-)
NSW	–	24	Woongarrah Wildcats (-)	4–2	Phoenix FC (-)
NSW	–	25	Doonside Hawks (-)	2–1	Wollongong United (-)
NSW	–	26	Lokomotiv Cove (-)	2–3	Randwick City (-)
NSW	–	27	Parklea SFC (-)	1–5	North Sydney United (-)
NSW	–	28	Revesby Rovers (-)	2–1†	White City SC (-)
NSW	–	29	The Ponds FC (-)	0–1	Toukley Gorokan (-)
NSW	–	30	Coledale Waves (-)	0–4	Penrith Rovers (-)
NSW	–	31	West Ryde Rovers (-)	2–1	Baulkham Hills FC (-)
NSW	–	32	Balmain & District FC (-)	0–14	Pennant Hills FC (-)
Northern New South Wales
NNSW	MNC	33	Wallis Lake (4)	3–2	Macleay Valley Rangers (4)
NNSW	MNC	34	Port United (-)	6–0	Wallamba FC (-)
NNSW	MNC	35	Kempsey Saints (4)	2–1	Wauchope Axemen (4)
NNSW	MNC	36	Taree Wildcats (4)	2–4	Port Saints (4)
NNSW	NC	37	Northern Storm Thunder (4)	1–3	Coffs Coast Tigers (4)
NNSW	NC	38	Orara Valley (4)	1–9	Boambee Bombers (4)
NNSW	NC	39	Urunga FC (4)	6–1	Westlawn Tigers (4)
NNSW	NC	40	Sawtell Scorpions (4)	w/o	Coffs City United (4)
NNSW	NI	41	Moree Services (-)	0–2	Demon Knights (4)
NNSW	NI	42	North Companions (4)	6–1	Narrabri FC (-)
NNSW	NI	43	Armidale City Westside (-)	0–9	Tamworth FC (-)
NNSW	FNC	44	Lismore Thistles (4)	8–3	Ballina (5)
NNSW	FNC	45	Bangalow (4)	8–1	Casino Cobras (-)
NNSW	FNC	46	Shores United (-)	w/o	Goonellabah FC (-)
NNSW	FNC	47	Lennox Head (5)	w/o	Italo Stars (4)
NNSW	STH	48	Beresfield United Senior (4)	2–0	Nelson Bay (5)
NNSW	STH	49	Cardiff City (4)	4–4†	Newcastle Suns (4)
Cardiff City advance 7–6 on penalties.
NNSW	STH	50	Merewether Advance (6)	w/o	Muswellbrook FC (6)
NNSW	STH	51	Charlestown Junior (5)	3–1	Morisset United (4)
NNSW	STH	52	Mayfield United Senior (4)	12–0	Dudley Redhead United Junior (7)
NNSW	STH	53	Jesmond FC (5)	0–1	Hamilton Azzurri (5)
NNSW	STH	54	Bolwarra Lorn (7)	2–1	Maryland Fletcher (6)
NNSW	STH	55	Stockton Sharks (5)	1–1†	Warners Bay (5)
Warners Bay advance 7–6 on penalties.
NNSW	STH	56	Swansea FC (4)	4–1	Westlakes Wildcats (6)
NNSW	STH	57	Barnsley United (5)	6–1	Medowie FC (-)
NNSW	STH	58	Dudley Redhead United Senior (7)	2–2†	Kotara South (5)
Dudley Redhead United SFC advance 4–2 on penalties.
NNSW	STH	59	Raymond Terrace (5)	4–2	Newcastle University (4)
NNSW	STH	60	Garden Suburb (4)	3–1	West Wallsend (4)
NNSW	STH	61	Hunter Simba (6)	5–5†	Maitland Junior FC (-)
Maitland Junior FC advance 6–5 on penalties.
Queensland
QLD	BNE	62	Western Spirit (5)	5–0	Logan Village (7)
QLD	BNE	63	Acacia Ridge (4)	3–4	North Star (5)
QLD	BNE	64	Ipswich City (5)	7–0	Park Ridge (5)
QLD	BNE	65	Clairvaux (6)	1–1	Westside (6)
Westside FC advance 6–5 on penalties.
QLD	BNE	66	Logan Roos (7)	2–2†	Ridge Hills United (7)
Ridge Hills United advance 4–3 on penalties.
QLD	BNE	67	Narangba United (6)	1–2	Tarragindi Tigers (6)
QLD	BNE	68	AC Carina (6)	w/o	Redcliffe PCYC (6)
QLD	BNE	69	Slacks Creek (6)	1–4	New Farm United (5)
QLD	BNE	70	Bethania Rams (7)	4–0	Logan Metro (7)
QLD	BNE	71	Brisbane Knights (4)	4–5	Annerley (5)
QLD	BNE	72	Toowong (5)	4–5	Caboolture (5)
QLD	BNE	73	Samford Rangers (6)	3–2	Taringa Rovers (4)
QLD	BNE	74	Pine Hills (5)	2–1	Moggill (5)
QLD	BNE	75	Jimboomba United (7)	4–2	North Brisbane (6)
QLD	BNE	76	Logan City Kings (7)	6–3	Kangaroo Point Rovers (6)
QLD	BNE	77	Oxley United (5)	6–1	Mooroondu (7)
QLD	BNE	78	The Lakes (7)	6–2	Bardon Latrobe (6)
QLD	BNE	79	St. George Willawong (5)	12–1	Springfield United (7)
QLD	BNE	80	Brisbane Athletic (7)	3–2†	Newmarket (6)
QLD	FNQ	81	Stratford Dolphins (4)	0–3	Leichhardt Lions (4)
QLD	FNQ	82	Innisfail United (4)	0–4	Marlin Coast Rangers (4)
QLD	NQ	83	Townville Warriors (4)	6–5†	Rebels Gunners (4)
QLD	NQ	84	MA Olympic (4)	2–1	Brothers Townsville (4)

Fed	Zone	Tie no	Home team (Tier)	Score	Away team (Tier)
QLD	MRF	85	Mackay Lions (4)	6–1	Mackay City Brothers (4)
QLD	SC	86	Caloundra FC (4)	2–0	Buderim Wanderers (4)
QLD	SC	87	Maroochydore Swans (4)	1–2	Woombye Snakes (4)
QLD	GC	88	Palm Beach Sharks (4)	0–3	Surfers Paradise Apollo (4)
QLD	WB	89	Across The Waves (4)	5–3†	Kawungan Sandy Straits (4)
QLD	SWQ	90	Rockville Rovers (4)	1–2†	University of Southern Queensland (4)
QLD	SWQ	91	Gatton (4)	2–3	Willowburn (4)
QLD	SWQ	92	Kingaroy SC (5)	6–2	Warwick Wolves (4)
South Australia
SA	–	93	Adelaide Raiders (3)	0–0†	Adelaide Blue Eagles (3)
Adelaide Blue Eagles advance 4–2 on penalties.
SA	–	94	Adelaide Hills Hawks (4)	2–1	Immanuel College Old Scholars (5)
SA	–	95	Blackfriars Old Scholars (5)	5–0	Adelaide Victory (4)
SA	–	96	Salisbury United (3)	w/o	Renmark Olympic (5)
SA	–	97	Modbury Vista (4)	0–8	Cumberland United (3)
SA	–	98	Mercedes Old Collegians (6)	0–1	Ghan United (6)
SA	–	99	Rostrevor Old Collegians (5)	2–3	Adelaide University (4)
SA	–	100	Elizabeth Downs (5)	4–6	Modbury Jets (3)
SA	–	101	Woodside Warriors (7)	2–9	Elizabeth Vale (5)
SA	–	102	Prince Alfred Old Collegians (7)	2–4†	Seaford Rangers (3)
SA	–	103	UniSA FC (4)	1–7	Adelaide Pumas (5)
SA	–	104	Cardijn Old Collegians (7)	3–4†	Mount Barker United (4)
SA	–	105	Parafield Gardens (5)	4–3	Adelaide Cobras (4)
SA	–	106	Playford City (4)	2–3	Brahma Lodge (5)
SA	–	107	Fulham United (3)	2–3	Gawler Eagles (4)
SA	–	108	Northern Demons (4)	2–0	Adelaide University Red (5)
SA	–	109	White City (3)	4–2	Port Adelaide Pirates (3)
SA	–	110	Eastern United (4)	4–3	Pontian Eagles (6)
SA	–	111	Western Strikers (3)	9–0	Adelaide Thunder (7)
SA	–	112	Salisbury Inter (5)	4–3	Adelaide Vipers (4)
SA	–	113	The Cove (3)	0–2	Noarlunga United (3)
Victoria
VIC	–	114	Northern Falcons (7)	6–1	North Melbourne Athletic (7)
VIC	–	115	La Trobe University (6)	0–2	Mooroolbark SC (5)
VIC	–	116	Old Scotch SC (5)	7–1	Seaford United (6)
VIC	–	117	Frankston Pines FC (5)	1–2	Ashburton United (7)
VIC	–	118	Peninsula Strikers (5)	1–0	Waverley Wanderers (8)
VIC	–	119	Heidelberg Stars (6)	0–3	Mill Park (5)
VIC	–	120	Fitzroy City SC (5)	1–3	Berwick City FC (5)
VIC	–	121	Healesville SC (7)	1–5	Brimbank Stallions (5)
VIC	–	122	Brighton (6)	5–1	Melton Phoenix (8)
VIC	–	123	Altona East Phoenix (5)	1–2	Keilor Wolves (8)
VIC	–	124	Brandon Park (5)	2–1	Monash University (7)
VIC	–	125	Hume United FC (5)	0–1	East Brighton United (7)
VIC	–	126	Watsonia Heights (7)	0–6	Boroondara-Carey Eagles (6)
VIC	–	127	Dingley Stars (6)	1–0	Mount Waverley City (8)
VIC	–	128	Sandown Lions (7)	3–2	Old Xaverians (7)
VIC	–	129	South Yarra (6)	1–2	Diamond Valley United (5)
VIC	–	130	Epping City (6)	6–0	Lara United (8)
VIC	–	131	Spring Hills (7)	3–4	Whitehorse United (6)
VIC	–	132	Sebastopol Vikings (6)	2–3	Mazenod United FC (5)
VIC	–	133	Yarra Jets (8)	1–8	Bayside Argonauts (6)
VIC	–	134	Doveton SC (5)	4–1	Springvale City (7)
VIC	–	135	Somerville Eagles (8)	0–4	Point Cook (6)
VIC	–	136	Whittlesea United SC (5)	1–0	Dandenong Warriors (7)
VIC	–	137	Moreland United (6)	2–3	Essendon United (6)
VIC	–	138	Brunswick Zebras (7)	3–2	Skye United (6)
VIC	–	139	Noble Park United (6)	4–1	Wangaratta City (9)
VIC	–	140	Laverton FC (7)	1–4	Heidelberg Eagles (8)
VIC	–	141	Heatherton United SC (5)	4–2†	RMIT (7)
VIC	–	142	Harrisfield Hurricanes (7)	1–1†	Williamstown (6)
Harrisfield Hurricanes advance 6–5 on penalties.
VIC	–	143	Monbulk Rangers (6)	w/o	Westvale SC (5)
VIC	–	144	Myrtleford Savoy (9)	3–1	Elwood City (7)
VIC	–	145	St Kevins Old Boys (7)	1–4	Craigieburn City (7)
VIC	–	146	Bell Park (7)	1–1†	Glenroy Lions (8)
Bell Park advance 4–1 on penalties.
VIC	–	147	FC Strathmore (6)	2–0	Knox City (5)
VIC	–	148	North Caulfield Senior FC (5)	3–4	Lalor United (7)
VIC	–	149	Tatura SC (9)	4–2	West Preston (7)
VIC	–	150	Western Eagles (7)	2–5†	Cairnlea FC (5)
VIC	–	151	Mount Lilydale Old Collegians (8)	0–1	Marcellin Old Collegians (7)
VIC	–	152	Truganina Hornets (7)	2–1	Corio SC (5)
VIC	–	153	Ringwood City (7)	3–2	Reservoir Yeti (8)
VIC	–	154	Geelong Rangers (5)	3–2	Doncaster Rovers SC (5)
VIC	–	155	Westgate (5)	2–1	Darebin United (7)
Western Australia
WA	–	156	Bunbury United (-)	3–0	Kalamunda United (13)
WA	–	157	Murray District Rangers (-)	1–9	Kingsley SC (5)
WA	–	158	Collie Power (-)	1–6	BrOzzy Sports Club (12)
WA	–	159	Kwinana United (5)	4–2	North Beach (-)
WA	–	160	Canning Buffers (-)	w/o	Cracovia White Eagles (7)
WA	–	161	Albany Rovers (-)	1–2	Yanchep United (-)
WA	–	162	Maccabi SC (-)	1–2	Phoenix Glory (-)
WA	–	163	Sporting Warriors (-)	w/o	Albany Bayswater (-)
WA	–	164	Hamersley Rovers (5)	2–1	Joondanna Blues (10)
WA	–	165	Challenger FC (-)	0–8	Perth AFC (-)
WA	–	166	Wembley Downs (5)	2–4	Bunbury Dynamos (-)
WA	–	167	Fraser Park (-)	0–0	Warnbro Strikers SC (7)
Warnbro Strikers advance 5–4 on penalties.
WA	–	168	Perth Royals (6)	0–3	Busselton City SC (-)
WA	–	169	Southern Spirit (5)	2–2	Woodvale FC (9)
Woodvale FC advance 4–2 on penalties.
WA	–	170	Ballajura AFC (7)	w/o	Boulder City (-)
WA	–	171	Dalyellup Park Rangers (-)	w/o	Northern City (-)

Notes

- w/o = Walkover
- † = After Extra Time
- NSW Byes – Albion Park White Eagles (6), Banksia Tigers (-), Bankstown RSL Dragons (8), Bass Hill (-), Bega Devils (-), Belrose-Terrey Hills Raiders (-), Berkeley Vale (-), Bomaderry SC (-), Bringelly FC (-), Brookvale Football Club (-), Budgewoi FC (-), Callala Brumbies (-), Central Coast United (-), Coniston FC (-), Connells Point Rovers FC (-), Cranebrook United (-), Dee Why FC (-), Emu Plains FC (-), Epping Eastwood (6), Forest Rangers (-), Gerringong Breakers (6), Gladesville Ravens (6), Glenhaven FC (-), Granville Kewpie Ariana (-), Greenacre Eagles (-), Hazelbrook FC (-), Helensburgh Thistle Soccer Club (-), Henwood Park FC (-), Hills Hawks FC (-), Holroyd Rangers SC (-), Kellyville Kolts (-), Kenthurst and District (-), Killarney District (6), Kogarah Waratah FC (-), Lake Albert (6), Lane Cove (-), Leichhardt Saints (SPL) (6), Lilli Pilli (6), Lindfield FC (-), Lugarno FC (-), Marayong FC (6), Maroubra United (6), Minchinbury Jets (-), Narellan Rangers SC (-), Padstow United (6), Pagewood Botany (-), Peakhurst United (-), Pendle Hill (-), Quakers Hill JSC (6), Ryde Saints United FC (-), Sans Souci FC (-), South Coast Flame FC (-), Tarrawanna Blueys SC (-), Terrigal United (6), Tolland FC (-), West Pennant Hills Cherrybrook (6), West Pennant Hills Redbacks (-) and Woy Woy FC (-).
- NNSW Byes – Mayfield United Junior (4) and Oxley Vale Attunga (4).
- QLD Byes – Albany Creek (4), Bayside United (4), Broadbeach United (4), Brothers Aston Villa (4), Burdekin FC (4), Centenary Stormers (4), Doon Villa (4), Gold Coast Knights (4), Grange Thistle (4), Mackay Magpies (4), Mackay Wanderers (4), Mount Gravatt Hawks (4), Murwillumbah SC (4), North Pine (4), Saints Eagles South (4), Southside Comets (4), The Gap (4), Tinana (5), University of Queensland (4), Virginia United (4) and West Wanderers (4).

== Third round ==
Fed	Zone	Tie no	Home team (Tier)	Score	Away team (Tier)
Australian Capital Territory
ACT	–	1	Gundaroo FC (6)	2–3†	UC Pumas (4)
ACT	–	2	Southern Tablelands United (3)	2–0	Woden Valley (4)
Southern Tablelands United removed from competition for fielding an ineligible player.
ACT	–	3	ANU FC (3)	3–1	White Eagles (3)
ACT	–	4	Queanbeyan City (3)	5–0	Narrabundah FC (3)
ACT	–	5	Burns FC (6)	w/o	Cooma Tigers (4)
ACT	–	6	Gungahlin Juventus (6)	2–0	Brindabella Blues (4)
ACT	–	7	O'Connor Knights (3)	2–0	Weston-Molonglo (3)
New South Wales
NSW	–	8	Pendle Hill (-)	2–4	North Sydney United (-)
NSW	–	9	Gladesville Ravens (6)	6–1	North Ryde (-)
NSW	–	10	Epping Eastwood (6)	8–2	Callala Brumbies (-)
NSW	–	11	Brookvale FC (-)	0–4	Albion Park White Eagles (6)
NSW	–	12	Maroubra United (6)	5–1	Woy Woy FC (-)
NSW	–	13	Revesby Rovers (-)	1–7	Kirrawee Kangaroos (-)
NSW	–	14	Western Condors (5)	2–1	Prospect United (5)
NSW	–	15	Helensburgh Thistle Soccer Club (-)	1–5	Coniston FC (-)
NSW	–	16	University of NSW (5)	3–1	Bankstown City (4)
NSW	–	17	West Pennant Hills Cherrybrook (6)	2–4	South Coast Flame FC (5)
NSW	–	18	Peakhurst United (-)	3–5	Southern Raiders (4)
NSW	–	19	Berkeley Vale (-)	5–1	Hills Hawks FC (-)
NSW	–	20	Kogarah Waratah FC (-)	1–5	Abbotsford FC (-)
NSW	–	21	Blue Mountains FC (-)	3–2†	Central Sydney Wolves (-)
NSW	–	22	Fraser Park (4)	w/o	Wagga City Wanderers (5)
NSW	–	23	FC Gazy Auburn (5)	5–4	Revesby Workers (-)
NSW	–	24	Ryde Saints United FC (-)	1–2	Balmain Tigers (5)
NSW	–	25	Hazelbrook FC (-)	0–1	Glebe Gorillas (-)
NSW	–	26	St George City (4)	7–4	Camden Tigers (5)
NSW	–	27	Harrington United (-)	3–6†	Hurstville Glory (-)
NSW	–	28	Bega Devils (-)	1–8	St Patrick's FC (-)
NSW	–	29	Holroyd Rangers SC (-)	0–4	Cronulla Seagulls (-)
NSW	–	30	Marayong FC (6)	4–2	Mosman FC (-)
NSW	–	31	Wollongong Olympic (-)	11–0	Bass Hill (-)
NSW	–	32	Woongarrah Wildcats (-)	4–1	Sydney CBD FC (-)
NSW	–	33	Killarney District (6)	3–0	Doonside Hawks (-)
NSW	–	34	Cranebrook United (-)	1–2	Bankstown RSL Dragons (8)
NSW	–	35	Padstow United (6)	1–6	Glebe Wanderers (-)
NSW	–	36	Glenhaven FC (-)	3–0	Bringelly FC (-)
NSW	–	37	Connells Point Rovers FC (-)	2–4	Henwood Park FC (-)
NSW	–	38	Kenthurst and District (-)	5–1	Toukley Gorokan (-)
NSW	–	39	Central Coast United (-)	2–0	Wyoming FC (-)
NSW	–	40	Quakers Hill JSC (6)	0–6	Terrigal United (6)
NSW	–	41	Hurstville City Minotaurs (5)	8–0	Lugarno FC (-)
NSW	–	42	Minchinbury Jets (-)	0–12	Belrose-Terrey Hills Raiders (-)
NSW	–	43	Hurstville ZFC (5)	2–1	Dulwich Hill (4)
NSW	–	44	East Gosford (-)	1–4	Nepean FC (5)
NSW	–	45	Waverley Old Boys (-)	4–0	Pagewood Botany (-)
NSW	–	46	Emu Plains FC (-)	2–1	Stanmore Hawks (4)
NSW	–	47	Kellyville Kolts (-)	2–1	Gerringong Breakers (6)
NSW	–	48	Chatswood Rangers (-)	1–4	Bankstown United (4)
NSW	–	49	Bulli FC (-)	6–1	Inter Lions (4)
NSW	–	50	West Ryde Rovers (-)	1–4	Randwick City (-)
NSW	–	51	Western NSW Mariners (4)	3–1†	Lindfield FC (-)
NSW	–	52	Granville Kewpie Ariana (-)	w/o	Lake Albert (6)
NSW	–	53	Leichhardt Saints (SPL) (6)	0–4	Bomaderry SC (-)
NSW	–	54	Sydney North West (-)	1–5	Tarrawanna Blueys SC (-)
NSW	–	55	Greenacre Eagles (-)	0–13	Sydney University (4)
NSW	–	56	Dunbar Rovers (4)	3–0	Port Kembla (-)
NSW	–	57	Narellan Rangers SC (-)	0–1	Carlton Rovers (-)
NSW	–	58	Sans Souci FC (-)	4–0	Forest Rangers (-)
NSW	–	59	West Pennant Hills Redbacks (-)	0–6	Hawkesbury City (4)
NSW	–	60	Lilli Pilli (6)	2–5†	Gladesville Ryde Magic (4)
NSW	–	61	Pennant Hills FC (-)	w/o	Dee Why FC (-)
Walkover for Pennant Hills – Dee Why FC removed.
NSW	–	62	Penrith Rovers (-)	1–4	Banksia Tigers (-)
NSW	–	63	Budgewoi FC (-)	6–0	Tolland FC (-)
NSW	–	64	Lane Cove (-)	0–3	Granville Rage (4)
Northern New South Wales
NNSW	MNC	65	Port United (-)	5–3	Wallis Lake (4)
NNSW	MNC	66	Kempsey Saints (4)	3–2	Port Saints (4)
NNSW	NI	67	North Companions (4)	1–2	Tamworth FC (-)
NNSW	NI	68	Oxley Vale Attunga (4)	2–2†	Demon Knights (4)
Demon Knights advance 5–4 on penalties.
NNSW	NC	69	Boambee Bombers (-)	3–1	Coffs City United (-)
NNSW	NC	70	Coffs Coast Tigers (-)	1–4	Urunga FC (-)
NNSW	FNC	71	Bangalow (4)	2–0	Lennox Head (5)
NNSW	FNC	72	Lismore Thistles (4)	1–1†	Goonellabah FC (-)
Goonellabah FC advance 6–5 on penalties.
NNSW	STH	73	Cessnock City Hornets (3)	w/o	Mayfield United Junior (4)
Walkover for Cessnock City Hornets – Mayfield United Junior removed.
NNSW	STH	74	Hamilton Azzurri (5)	3–1	Merewether Advance (6)
NNSW	STH	75	Wallsend FC (3)	5–0	New Lambton FC (3)
NNSW	STH	76	Cooks Hill United (3)	0–2	Kahibah FC (3)
NNSW	STH	77	Mayfield United Senior (4)	2–2†	Thornton Redbacks (3)
Thornton Redbacks advance 3–2 on penalties.
NNSW	STH	78	Swansea FC (4)	3–1	Belmont Swansea United (3)
NNSW	STH	79	Dudley Redhead Senior (7)	5–3	West Wallsend (3)
NNSW	STH	80	Raymond Terrace (5)	4–1	Beresfield United Senior (4)
NNSW	STH	81	Singleton Strikers (3)	1–1†	Charlestown Junior (5)
Singleton Strikers advance 3–2 on penalties.
NNSW	STH	82	Warners Bay (5)	3–4	South Cardiff (3)
NNSW	STH	83	Maitland Junior FC (-)	2–3	Toronto Awaba Stags (3)
NNSW	STH	84	Garden Suburb (4)	4–2	Bolwarra Lorn (7)
NNSW	STH	85	Cardiff City (4)	1–0	Barnsley United (5)
Northern Territory
NT	DAR	86	Casuarina FC (2)	1–2	Mindil Aces (2)
NT	DAR	87	Palmerston Rovers (2)	3–1	Darwin Hearts FC (3)
NT	DAR	88	University Azzurri (2)	1–0	Port Darwin (2)
Queensland
QLD	BNE	89	Ipswich City (5)	3–1	Bayside United (4)
QLD	BNE	90	Caboolture (5)	2–0	Tarragindi Tigers (6)
QLD	BNE	91	North Star (5)	4–1	Westside (6)
QLD	BNE	92	Brisbane Athletic (7)	2–3	Samford Rangers (6)
QLD	BNE	93	Jimboomba United (7)	1–4	AC Carina (6)
QLD	BNE	94	Centenary Stormers (4)	4–2	Oxley United (5)
QLD	BNE	95	Pine Hills (5)	2–3	Mount Gravatt Hawks (4)
QLD	BNE	96	St. George Willawong (5)	2–1	The Gap (4)
QLD	BNE	97	Grange Thistle (4)	2–2†	New Farm United (5)
New Farm United advance 4–1 on penalties.

Fed	Zone	Tie no	Home team (Tier)	Score	Away team (Tier)
QLD	BNE	98	Logan City Kings (7)	0–2	The Lakes (7)
QLD	BNE	99	Ridge Hills United (7)	0–4	University of Queensland (4)
QLD	BNE	100	Annerley (5)	6–3	Western Spirit (5)
QLD	BNE	101	Albany Creek (4)	6–3	Bethania Rams (7)
QLD	BNE	102	Virginia United (4)	5–2	North Pine (4)
QLD	FNQ	103	Leichhardt Lions (4)	0–6	Southside Comets (4)
QLD	NQ	104	MA Olympic (4)	0–0†	Townville Warriors (4)
MA Olympic advance 8–7 on penalties.
QLD	NQ	105	Burdekin FC (4)	1–2	Saints Eagles South (4)
QLD	CQ	106	Frenchville FC (4)	2–2†	Clinton FC (4)
Clinton FC advance 4–2 on penalties.
QLD	CQ	107	Bluebirds United (4)	2–1	Nerimbera FC (4)
QLD	MRF	108	Mackay Magpies (4)	5–0	Mackay Wanderers (4)
QLD	SC	109	Caloundra FC (4)	2–2†	Woombye Snakes (4)
Caloundra FC advance 5–4 on penalties.
QLD	GC	110	Gold Coast Knights (4)	1–0	Surfers Paradise Apollo (4)
QLD	GC	111	Murwillumbah SC (4)	1–3	Broadbeach United (4)
QLD	WB	112	Tinana (5)	2–15	Brothers Aston Villa (4)
QLD	WB	113	Doon Villa (4)	4–1	Across The Waves (4)
QLD	SWQ	114	Willowburn (4)	3–1	West Wanderers (4)
QLD	SWQ	115	Kingaroy SC (5)	2–5	University of Southern Queensland (4)
South Australia
SA	–	116	North Eastern MetroStars (2)	2–1	Campbelltown City (2)
SA	–	117	Salisbury Inter (5)	2–4	Adelaide University (4)
SA	–	118	Noarlunga United (3)	4–1	Adelaide Pumas (5)
SA	–	119	Para Hills Knights (2)	2–2†	Croydon Kings (2)
Croydon Kings advance 5–4 on penalties.
SA	–	120	Blackfriars Old Scholars (5)	5–0	Mount Barker United (4)
SA	–	121	South Adelaide (2)	0–3	Adelaide City (2)
SA	–	122	Western Strikers (3)	3–1	Northern Demons (4)
SA	–	123	Salisbury United (3)	0–2	Cumberland United (3)
SA	–	124	Adelaide Blue Eagles (3)	2–1	West Torrens Birkalla (2)
SA	–	125	Sturt Lions (2)	1–5	Adelaide Comets (2)
SA	–	126	Brahma Lodge (5)	2–3	Modbury Jets (3)
SA	–	127	Adelaide Olympic (2)	4–1	Parafield Gardens (5)
SA	–	128	Elizabeth Vale (5)	2–3†	Seaford Rangers (3)
SA	–	129	Ghan United (6)	2–1	White City (3)
SA	–	130	Eastern United (4)	0–5	West Adelaide (2)
SA	–	131	Gawler SC (4)	3–1	Adelaide Hills Hawks (4)
Tasmania
TAS	–	132	Metro FC (3)	0–1	Riverside Olympic (3)
TAS	–	133	University of Tasmania (3)	3–1	Beachside FC (3)
TAS	–	134	Southern FC (3)	0–4	New Town Eagles (3)
TAS	–	135	Burnie (3)	2–2†	Ulverstone FC (3)
Ulverstone FC advance 4–3 on penalties.
TAS	–	136	Launceston United (3)	0–10	Taroona FC (3)
TAS	–	137	Nelson Eastern Suburbs (3)	1–1†	Hobart United (3)
Hobart United advance 5–4 on penalties.
Victoria
VIC	–	138	Beaumaris (4)	1–3	Essendon Royals (4)
VIC	–	139	Peninsula Strikers (5)	1–0	Lalor United (7)
VIC	–	140	Morwell Pegasus (4)	0–6	Richmond SC (4)
VIC	–	141	Mooroolbark (5)	1–0	Old Scotch SC (5)
VIC	–	142	Clifton Hill (4)	3–4†	Eltham Redbacks (4)
VIC	–	143	Mornington (4)	2–0	Casey Comets (4)
VIC	–	144	Keilor Park (4)	0–2	Berwick City FC (5)
VIC	–	145	Dingley Stars (6)	2–1	Diamond Valley United (5)
VIC	–	146	Marcellin Old Collegians (7)	0–2	Heatherton United SC (5)
VIC	–	147	Ashburton United (7)	2–4	Brighton (6)
VIC	–	148	Craigieburn City (7)	0–2	Cairnlea FC (5)
VIC	–	149	Preston Lions (4)	4–0	Westgate (5)
VIC	–	150	Caufield United Cobras (4)	3–1	Epping City (6)
VIC	–	151	Mill Park (5)	2–3	Heidelberg Eagles (8)
Heidelberg Eagles removed from competition for fielding ineligible players.
VIC	–	152	Northern Falcons (7)	5–0	Harrisfield Hurricanes (7)
VIC	–	153	Keilor Wolves (8)	0–7	North Sunshine Eagles (4)
VIC	–	154	Strathmore (6)	5–2	Bell Park (7)
VIC	–	155	Mazenod United (5)	2–2†	Sandown Lions (7)
Mazenod United advance 4–2 on penalties.
VIC	–	156	Ringwood City (7)	3–2	Myrtleford Savoy (9)
VIC	–	157	Geelong SC (4)	7–2	Doveton SC (5)
Geelong SC removed from competition for fielding ineligible players.
VIC	–	158	East Brighton United (7)	3–4	Banyule City (4)
VIC	–	159	Boroondara-Carey Eagles (6)	3–2†	Monbulk Rangers (6)
VIC	–	160	Whittlesea United (5)	0–0†	Whitehorse United (6)
Whittlesea United advance 6–5 on penalties.
VIC	–	161	Warragul United (4)	2–4	Sydenham Park (4)
VIC	–	162	Truganina Hornets (7)	1–0	Essendon United (6)
VIC	–	163	Malvern City (4)	5–1	Noble Park United (6)
VIC	–	164	Manningham United (4)	13–0	Tatura SC (9)
VIC	–	165	Brunswick Zebras (7)	2–5	Yarraville Glory (4)
VIC	–	166	Brandon Park (5)	3–1	Brimbank Stallions (5)
VIC	–	167	Hoppers Crossing SC (4)	w/o	Altona City (4)
VIC	–	168	St Kilda (4)	5–1†	Bayside Argonauts (6)
VIC	–	169	Point Cook (6)	3–0	South Springvale (4)
VIC	–	170	Geelong Rangers (5)	0–1	Western Suburbs (4)
Western Australia
WA	–	171	Phoenix Glory (-)	1–5	Swan United (4)
WA	–	172	South West Phoenix (3)	10–0	Yanchep United (-)
WA	–	173	Kingsley SC (5)	1–5	Rockingham City (3)
WA	–	174	Dianella White Eagles (3)	7–1	Curtin University (4)
WA	–	175	Bunbury United (-)	1–4	Busselton City SC (-)
WA	–	176	Kwinana United (5)	4–0	Warnbro Strikers SC (7)
WA	–	177	Ballajura AFC (7)	w/o	Canning City (4)
WA	–	178	Northern City (-)	5–8	Bunbury Dynamos (-)
WA	–	179	Balga (4)	4–1	Shamrock Rovers (4)
WA	–	180	Joondalup City (3)	1–5	Ashfield (3)
WA	–	181	Wanneroo City (4)	7–1	Woodvale FC (9)
WA	–	182	BrOzzy Sports Club (12)	w/o	Cracovia White Eagles (7)
WA	–	183	Murdoch University-Melville (4)	0–2	Fremantle City FC (3)
WA	–	184	Morley-Windmills (3)	1–2	Kelmscott Roos (4)
WA	–	185	Gwelup Croatia (3)	3–1	Quinns (4)
WA	–	186	UWA-Nedlands (3)	2–1	Hamersley Rovers (5)
WA	–	187	Perth AFC (-)	0–6	Western Knights (3)
WA	–	188	Albany Bayswater (-)	1–5	Gosnells City (4)
WA	–	189	Olympic Kingsway (4)	3–0	Mandurah City (3)

Notes

- w/o = Walkover
- † = After Extra Time
- NT Byes – Darwin Olympic (2), Hellenic AC (2)
- QLD Byes – Capricorn Coast (4), Mackay Lions (4), Marlin Coast Rangers (4) and Southside United (4).

== Fourth round ==
Fed	Zone	Tie no	Home team (Tier)	Score	Away team (Tier)
Australian Capital Territory
ACT	–	1	Queanbeyan City (3)	1–2	Gungahlin United (2)
ACT	–	2	UC Pumas (4)	0–5	Belconnen United (2)
ACT	–	3	Tuggeranong United (2)	1–2	Woden Weston FC (2)
ACT	–	4	Burns FC (6)	1–4	Gungahlin Juventus (6)
ACT	–	5	ANU FC (3)	2–4†	Canberra FC (2)
ACT	–	6	Canberra Olympic (2)	1–0	Tigers FC (2)
ACT	–	7	Riverina Rhinos (2)	0–1	Monaro Panthers (2)
ACT	–	8	Woden Valley (4)	0–9	O'Connor Knights (3)
New South Wales
NSW	–	9	St George FC (3)	3–1	North Sydney United (-)
NSW	–	10	Bankstown RSL Dragons (8)	3–6	Gladesville Ravens (6)
NSW	–	11	Rockdale City Suns (2)	12–0	Glebe Wanderers (-)
NSW	–	12	Nepean FC (5)	1–2	Kirrawee Kangaroos (-)
NSW	–	13	Sydney Olympic (2)	7–0	Emu Plains FC (-)
NSW	–	14	Albion Park White Eagles (6)	3–1	Randwick City (-)
NSW	–	15	Sans Souci FC (-)	2–3	Terrigal United (6)
NSW	–	16	Macarthur Rams FC (3)	0–2	Tarrawanna Blueys SC (-)
NSW	–	17	Waverley Old Boys (-)	2–4†	Hawkesbury City (4)
NSW	–	18	Bonnyrigg White Eagles (2)	6–1	Woongarrah Wildcats (-)
NSW	–	19	APIA Leichhardt Tigers (2)	9–1	Fraser Park (4)
NSW	–	20	Belrose-Terrey Hills Raiders (-)	1–0	Banksia Tigers (-)
NSW	–	21	Bankstown City FC (3)	1–3	Hakoah Sydney City East (2)
NSW	–	22	Henwood Park FC (-)	5–4†	St Patrick's FC (-)
NSW	–	23	Carlton Rovers (-)	2–3	Hurstville City Minotaurs (5)
NSW	–	24	Sydney University (4)	0–4	Central Coast United (-)
NSW	–	25	Hills Brumbies FC (3)	2–1	Blacktown Spartans FC (3)
NSW	–	26	Wollongong Wolves (2)	3–0	Kellyville Kolts (-)
NSW	–	27	FC Gazy Auburn (5)	2–1	South Coast Flame FC (5)
NSW	–	28	Bankstown United (4)	3–1	Western Condors (5)
NSW	–	29	Coniston FC (-)	1–3	Bulli FC (-)
NSW	–	30	Granville Kewpie Ariana (-)	0–3	UNSW (5)
NSW	–	31	Granville Rage (4)	0–5	Southern Raiders (4)
NSW	–	32	Marconi Stallions (2)	2–1	Parramatta FC (3)
NSW	–	33	Marayong FC (6)	0–3	Bomaderry SC (-)
NSW	–	34	Abbotsford FC (-)	2–7	Dunbar Rovers (4)
NSW	–	35	Sutherland Sharks (2)	3–1†	North Shore Mariners (3)
NSW	–	36	Sydney United 58 (2)	7–0	Glebe Gorillas (-)
NSW	–	37	Northern Tigers FC (3)	13–0	Budgewoi FC (-)
NSW	–	38	Spirit FC (3)	5–4†	Hurstville ZFC (5)
NSW	–	39	Mounties Wanderers FC (3)	4–0	Rydalmere Lions FC (3)
NSW	–	40	Maroubra United (6)	4–1	Hurstville Glory (-)
NSW	–	41	Wollongong Olympic (-)	7–0	Kenthurst and District (-)
NSW	–	42	Pennant Hills FC (-)	1–4	St George City (4)
NSW	–	43	Glenhaven FC (-)	0–4	Gladesville Ryde Magic (4)
NSW	–	44	Manly United (2)	3–2†	Mt Druitt Town Rangers (3)
NSW	–	45	Blacktown City (2)	9–1	Blue Mountains FC (-)
NSW	–	46	Berkeley Vale (-)	6–0	Western NSW Mariners (4)
NSW	–	47	Cronulla Seagulls (-)	1–4	Balmain Tigers (5)
NSW	–	48	Epping Eastwood (6)	1–8	Killarney District (6)
Northern New South Wales
NNSW	NTH	49	Kempsey Saints (4)	0–5	Boambee Bombers (-)
NNSW	NTH	50	Urunga FC (-)	4–5†	Port United (-)
NNSW	NTH	51	Goonellabah FC (-)	0–1†	Demon Knights (4)
NNSW	NTH	52	Bangalow (4)	3–1	Tamworth FC (-)
NNSW	STH	53	Edgeworth Eagles (2)	4–0	Singleton Strikers (3)
NNSW	STH	54	Wallsend FC (3)	1–4	Broadmeadow Magic (2)
NNSW	STH	55	Lambton Jaffas (2)	11–0	South Cardiff (3)
NNSW	STH	56	Kahibah FC (3)	1–5	Hamilton Olympic (2)
NNSW	STH	57	Raymond Terrace (5)	5–1	Garden Suburb (4)
NNSW	STH	58	Cardiff City (4)	1–3	Cessnock City Hornets (3)
NNSW	STH	59	Swansea FC (4)	2–3	Thornton Redbacks (3)
NNSW	STH	60	Hamilton Azzurri (5)	0–11	Charlestown City Blues (2)
NNSW	STH	61	Lake Macquarie (2)	2–0	Maitland FC (2)
NNSW	STH	62	Toronto Awaba Stags (3)	1–4	Adamstown Rosebud (2)
NNSW	STH	63	Dudley Redhead Senior (7)	3–4	Valentine Phoenix (2)
Northern Territory
NT	DAR	64	Mindil Aces (2)	1–4	Palmerston Rovers (2)
NT	DAR	65	Hellenic AC (2)	4–0	Darwin Olympic (2)
Queensland
QLD	BNE	66	AC Carina (6)	0–2	The Lakes (7)
QLD	BNE	67	Annerley (5)	0–4	Mitchelton (3)
QLD	BNE	68	Peninsula Power (3)	3–0	Redlands United (2)
QLD	BNE	69	Centenary Stormers (4)	7–1	Holland Park Hawks (3)
QLD	BNE	70	Ipswich Knights (3)	0–3	Souths United (3)
QLD	BNE	71	Eastern Suburbs (3)	9–0	North Star (5)
QLD	BNE	72	Olympic FC (2)	7–1	St. George Willawong (5)
QLD	BNE	73	Rochedale Rovers (3)	4–0	Samford Rangers (6)
QLD	BNE	74	Wolves FC (3)	1–0	University of Queensland (4)
QLD	BNE	75	Virginia United (4)	2–4	Logan Lightning (3)
QLD	BNE	76	Capalaba FC (3)	2–5	Brisbane City (2)
QLD	BNE	77	Southside Eagles (3)	0–4	Moreton Bay United (2)
QLD	BNE	78	Lions FC (2)	5–1	Caboolture (5)

Fed	Zone	Tie no	Home team (Tier)	Score	Away team (Tier)
QLD	BNE	79	Albany Creek (4)	1–3	Brisbane Strikers (2)
QLD	BNE	80	Mount Gravatt Hawks (4)	1–2	Western Pride (2)
QLD	BNE	81	Ipswich City (5)	2–1†	New Farm United (5)
QLD	FNQ	82	Southside Comets (4)	2–0	Marlin Coast Rangers (4)
QLD	NQ	83	MA Olympic (4)	6–2	Saints Eagles South (4)
QLD	CQ	84	Southside United (4)	1–1†	Clinton FC (4)
Southside United advance 3–2 on penalties.
QLD	CQ	85	Capricorn Coast (4)	1–3	Bluebirds United (4)
QLD	MRF	86	Mackay Magpies (4)	5–1	Mackay Lions (4)
QLD	SC	87	Caloundra FC (4)	3–2	Sunshine Coast Wanderers (3)
QLD	WB	88	Brothers Aston Villa (4)	0–3	Doon Villa (4)
QLD	GC	89	Gold Coast Knights (4)	1–0	Broadbeach United (4)
QLD	SWQ	90	Willowburn (4)	0–2†	University of Southern Queensland (4)
South Australia
SA	–	91	Blackfriars Old Scholars (5)	1–5	Adelaide Olympic (2)
SA	–	92	West Adelaide (2)	0–1	Adelaide Comets (2)
SA	–	93	Adelaide Blue Eagles (3)	3–0	Noarlunga United (3)
SA	–	94	Adelaide City (2)	5–0	Ghan United (6)
SA	–	95	Adelaide University (4)	0–1	Cumberland United (3)
SA	–	96	Gawler SC (4)	0–3	Modbury Jets (3)
SA	–	97	Croydon Kings (2)	2–1	North Eastern MetroStars (2)
SA	–	98	Seaford Rangers (3)	3–2†	Western Strikers (3)
Tasmania
TAS	–	99	Hobart United (3)	3–0	Somerset FC (3)
TAS	–	100	Taroona FC (3)	7–0	University of Tasmania (3)
TAS	–	101	Ulverstone FC (3)	0–6	Northern Rangers (2)
TAS	–	102	Riverside Olympic (3)	1–11	Hobart Zebras (2)
TAS	–	103	Kingborough Lions United (2)	0–6	Launceston City (2)
TAS	–	104	New Town Eagles (3)	0–7	Devonport City (2)
TAS	–	105	Clarence United (2)	0–6	South Hobart (2)
TAS	–	106	Olympia FC (2)	3–3†	Glenorchy Knights (3)
Olympia FC advance 5–3 on penalties.
Victoria
VIC	–	107	Caufield United Cobras (4)	3–1	Boroondara-Carey Eagles (6)
VIC	–	108	Bentleigh Greens SC (2)	4–0	Box Hill United (3)
VIC	–	109	Green Gully (2)	3–0	Moreland City (3)
VIC	–	110	Preston Lions (4)	3–0	Nunawading City (3)
VIC	–	111	Eastern Lions (3)	0–2	Oakleigh Cannons (2)
VIC	–	112	Yarraville Glory (4)	2–1	Brandon Park (5)
VIC	–	113	Strathmore (6)	0–2	Brunswick City (3)
VIC	–	114	Moreland Zebras (3)	1–1†	Berwick City FC (5)
Moreland Zebras advance 4–3 on penalties.
VIC	–	115	Port Melbourne (2)	2–1	Pascoe Vale (2)
VIC	–	116	Sydenham Park (4)	7–0	Ringwood City (7)
VIC	–	117	Banyule City (4)	1–3	Essendon Royals (4)
VIC	–	118	Mill Park (5)	0–3	Sunshine George Cross (3)
VIC	–	119	Langwarrin (3)	1–2	North Geelong Warriors (3)
VIC	–	120	North Sunshine Eagles (4)	3–0	Dingley Stars (6)
VIC	–	121	Mazenod United FC (5)	0–1	Northcote City (2)
VIC	–	122	Hume City (2)	1–0	South Melbourne (2)
VIC	–	123	Melbourne Knights (2)	2–4	Altona Magic (3)
VIC	–	124	Goulburn Valley Suns (3)	6–1	Northern Falcons (7)
VIC	–	125	Bulleen Lions (2)	3–1	Doveton SC (5)
VIC	–	126	Malvern City (4)	1–3†	Eltham Redbacks (4)
VIC	–	127	Werribee City (3)	0–3	Avondale FC (2)
VIC	–	128	Whittlesea United (5)	3–2†	Western Suburbs (4)
VIC	–	129	Point Cook (6)	1–3†	Hoppers Crossing SC (4)
VIC	–	130	Manningham United (4)	6–2	Mooroolbark (5)
VIC	–	131	Kingston City (2)	2–0	Dandenong City (3)
VIC	–	132	Cairnlea FC (5)	3–1	Springvale White Eagles (3)
VIC	–	133	Dandenong Thunder (2)	5–1	Brighton (6)
VIC	–	134	Murray United (3)	2–1	Ballarat City (3)
VIC	–	135	Truganina Hornets (7)	2–4	Whittlesea Ranges (3)
VIC	–	136	Richmond SC (4)	6–0	Heatherton United SC (5)
VIC	–	137	St Albans Saints (3)	2–3	St Kilda (4)
VIC	–	138	Mornington (4)	4–1	Peninsula Strikers (5)
Western Australia
WA	–	139	Inglewood United (2)	1–3	ECU Joondalup (2)
WA	–	140	South West Phoenix (3)	0–3	Forrestfield United (2)
WA	–	141	Kwinana United (5)	0–8	Gwelup Croatia (3)
WA	–	142	Rockingham City (3)	2–3	Armadale (2)
WA	–	143	Olympic Kingsway (4)	2–3	Cockburn City (2)
WA	–	144	Balga (4)	0–1	Floreat Athena (2)
WA	–	145	Busselton City SC (-)	1–5	Subiaco AFC (2)
WA	–	146	Kelmscott Roos (4)	0–1	UWA-Nedlands (3)
WA	–	147	Balcatta (2)	8–0	BrOzzy Sports Club (12)
WA	–	148	Fremantle City FC (3)	0–1	Joondalup United (2)
WA	–	149	Gosnells City (4)	0–10	Bayswater City (2)
WA	–	150	Dianella White Eagles (3)	5–1	Canning City (4)
WA	–	151	Stirling Lions (2)	10–0	Bunbury Dynamos (-)
WA	–	152	Western Knights (3)	0–1	Sorrento (2)
WA	–	153	Ashfield (3)	0–4	Perth (2)
WA	–	154	Wanneroo City (4)	2–4	Swan United (4)

Notes

- † = After Extra Time
- NNSW Bye – Weston Workers Bears (2).
- NT Bye – University Azzurri (2).

== Fifth round ==
Fed	Zone	Tie no	Home team (Tier)	Score	Away team (Tier)
Australian Capital Territory
ACT	–	1	Belconnen United (2)	8–5	O'Connor Knights (3)
ACT	–	2	Gungahlin United (2)	6–0	Gungahlin Juventus (6)
ACT	–	3	Monaro Panthers (2)	2–4	Woden Weston FC (2)
ACT	–	4	Canberra FC (2)	2–0	Canberra Olympic (2)
New South Wales
NSW	–	5	Northern Tigers FC (3)	1–3	Bonnyrigg White Eagles (2)
NSW	–	6	Gladesville Ryde Magic (4)	2–1	Dunbar Rovers (4)
NSW	–	7	Hills Brumbies FC (3)	3–1	Belrose-Terrey Hills Raiders (4)
NSW	–	8	Bomaderry SC (-)	1–1†	Killarney District (6)
Bomaderry SC advance 6–5 on penalties.
NSW	–	9	Balmain Tigers (5)	0–2	Kirrawee Kangaroos (-)
NSW	–	10	Terrigal United (6)	0–2	Sydney Olympic (2)
NSW	–	11	Hawkesbury City (4)	2–1	Berkeley Vale (-)
NSW	–	12	Southern Raiders (-)	5–4	Albion Park White Eagles (6)
NSW	–	13	Wollongong Olympic (6)	0–4	APIA Leichhardt Tigers (2)
NSW	–	14	Tarrawanna Blueys (6)	1–1†	University of NSW (5)
Tarrawanna Blueys advance 4–3 on penalties.
NSW	–	15	Sydney United 58 (2)	12–0	Henwood Park (-)
NSW	–	16	Wollongong Wolves (2)	1–2	Spirit FC (3)
NSW	–	17	Manly United (2)	1–2	Blacktown City (2)
NSW	–	18	Mounties Wanderers FC (3)	6–1	FC Gazy Auburn (-)
NSW	–	19	Hurstville City Minotaurs (5)	1–2	Central Coast United (-)
NSW	–	20	Rockdale City Suns (2)	3–0	Bankstown United (4)
NSW	–	21	Sutherland Sharks (2)	0–2	Hakoah Sydney City East (2)
NSW	–	22	Maroubra United (6)	1–3	St George City (4)
NSW	–	23	Bulli FC (6)	0–1†	St George FC (3)
NSW	–	24	Marconi Stallions (2)	4–2	Gladesville Ravens (6)
Northern New South Wales
NNSW	NTH	25	Port United (4)	2–0	Demon Knights (4)
NNSW	NTH	26	Bangalow (4)	2–5	Boambee Bombers (4)
NNSW	STH	27	Weston Workers Bears (2)	0–2	Hamilton Olympic (2)
NNSW	STH	28	Raymond Terrace (5)	0–3	Adamstown Rosebud (2)
NNSW	STH	29	Cessnock City Hornets (3)	1–4	Lambton Jaffas (2)
NNSW	STH	30	Thornton Redbacks (3)	0–2	Broadmeadow Magic (2)
NNSW	STH	31	Charlestown City Blues (2)	3–1	Lake Macquarie (2)
NNSW	STH	32	Valentine Phoenix (2)	0–1	Edgeworth Eagles (2)
Northern Territory
NT	DAR	33	Hellenic AC (2)	2–0	University Azzurri (2)
NT	ASP	34	Alice Springs Vikings (2)	0–5	Verdi FC (2)
NT	ASP	35	Alice Springs Celtic (2)	6–5	Alice Springs Stormbirds (2)
Queensland
QLD	BNE	36	Olympic FC (2)	2–1	Centenary Stormers (4)
QLD	BNE	37	Logan Lightning (3)	2–1	Mitchelton (3)
QLD	BNE	38	The Lakes (7)	1–9	Brisbane Strikers (2)
QLD	BNE	39	Ipswich City (5)	0–4	Peninsula Power (3)
QLD	BNE	40	Lions FC (2)	3–2	Eastern Suburbs (3)
QLD	BNE	41	Brisbane City (2)	4–1	Western Pride (2)

Fed	Zone	Tie no	Home team (Tier)	Score	Away team (Tier)
QLD	BNE	42	Moreton Bay United (2)	4–0	Souths United (3)
QLD	BNE	43	Rochedale Rovers (3)	3–0	Wolves FC (3)
QLD	FNQ	44	Southside Comets (4)	3–4†	Cairns FC (2)
QLD	NQ	45	MA Olympic (4)	0–1†	North Queensland United (2)
QLD	CQ	46	Southside United (4)	0–2	Bluebirds United (4)
QLD	MRF	47	Mackay Magpies (4)	0–4	Magpies Crusaders United (2)
QLD	SC	48	Caloundra FC (4)	2–3	Sunshine Coast (2)
QLD	WB	49	Doon Villa (4)	2–1	Wide Bay Buccaneers (3)
QLD	GC	50	Gold Coast Knights (4)	3–2	Gold Coast United (2)
QLD	SWQ	51	University of Southern Queensland (4)	0–6	South West Queensland Thunder (2)
South Australia
SA	–	52	Adelaide Blue Eagles (3)	1–3	Croydon Kings (2)
SA	–	53	Adelaide Comets (2)	1–1†	Adelaide City (2)
Adelaide Comets advance 4–3 on penalties.
SA	–	54	Cumberland United (3)	2–1†	Adelaide Olympic (2)
SA	–	55	Modbury Jets (3)	3–3†	Seaford Rangers (3)
Modbury Jets advance 5–3 on penalties.
Tasmania
TAS	–	56	South Hobart (2)	5–1	Hobart Zebras (2)
TAS	–	57	Devonport City (2)	4–3†	Olympia FC (2)
TAS	–	58	Launceston City (2)	4–1	Hobart United (3)
TAS	–	59	Northern Rangers (2)	6–0	Taroona FC (3)
Victoria
VIC	–	60	Essendon Royals (4)	0–1	Hume City (2)
VIC	–	61	Kingston City (2)	3–1	Manningham United (4)
VIC	–	62	Caulfield United Cobras (4)	0–1	Whittlesea United (5)
VIC	–	63	Whittlesea Ranges (3)	6–1	Yarraville (4)
VIC	–	64	Oakleigh Cannons (2)	6–0	Sydenham Park (4)
VIC	–	65	Bulleen Lions (2)	0–5	Avondale (2)
VIC	–	66	Dandenong Thunder (2)	0–1	Moreland Zebras (3)
VIC	–	67	Northcote City (2)	2–0	Green Gully (2)
VIC	–	68	North Sunshine Eagles (4)	4–2†	North Geelong Warriors (3)
VIC	–	69	Preston Lions (4)	0–1†	Richmond SC (4)
VIC	–	70	Mornington (4)	2–0	Brunswick City (3)
VIC	–	71	Cairnlea (5)	0–2	Murray United (3)
VIC	–	72	St Kilda (4)	2–3	Bentleigh Greens (2)
VIC	–	73	Altona Magic (3)	2–0	Hoppers Crossing (4)
VIC	–	74	Goulbourn Valley Suns (3)	2–1	Eltham Redbacks (4)
VIC	–	75	Port Melbourne (2)	3–0	Sunshine George Cross (2)
Western Australia
WA	–	76	Subiaco AFC (2)	3–1	Stirling Lions (2)
WA	–	77	Sorrento (2)	3–4	Perth (2)
WA	–	78	Gwelup Croatia (3)	3–1†	Cockburn City (2)
WA	–	79	Joondalup United (2)	1–4	Forrestfield United (2)
WA	–	80	Balcatta (2)	2–3†	Armadale (2)
WA	–	81	ECU Joondalup (2)	5–0	UWA-Nedlands (3)
WA	–	82	Bayswater City (2)	1–2	Floreat Athena (2)
WA	–	83	Swan United (4)	1–6	Dianella White Eagles (3)

Notes

- † = After Extra Time
- NT Bye – Palmerston Rovers (2).

== Sixth round ==
Fed	Zone	Tie no	Home team (Tier)	Score	Away team (Tier)
Australian Capital Territory
ACT	–	1	Canberra FC (2)	3–0	Belconnen United (2)
ACT	–	2	Gungahlin United (2)	4–3†	Woden Weston FC (2)
New South Wales
NSW	–	3	Kirrawee Kangaroos (-)	1–2	Tarrawanna Blueys (6)
NSW	–	4	Sydney Olympic (2)	3–0	Hawkesbury City (4)
NSW	–	5	Hills Brumbies FC (3)	3–1	Central Coast United (-)
NSW	–	6	St George City (4)	0–1†	Bonnyrigg White Eagles (2)
NSW	–	7	Southern Raiders (-)	1–4	Marconi Stallions (2)
NSW	–	8	Blacktown City (2)	w/o	Gladesville Ryde Magic (4)
NSW	–	9	APIA Leichhardt Tigers (2)	3–2	St George FC (3)
NSW	–	10	Bomaderry SC (-)	0–4	Spirit FC (3)
NSW	–	11	Hakoah Sydney City East (2)	2–0	Mounties Wanderers FC (3)
NSW	–	12	Rockdale City Suns (2)	2–1	Sydney United 58 (2)
Northern New South Wales
NNSW	NTH v STH	13	Boambee Bombers (-)	0–6	Charlestown City Blues (2)
NNSW	NTH v STH	14	Port United (-)	0–8	Lambton Jaffas (2)
NNSW	STH	15	Edgeworth Eagles (2)	2–3	Hamilton Olympic (2)
NNSW	STH	16	Adamstown Rosebud (2)	0–3	Broadmeadow Magic (2)
Northern Territory
NT	DAR	17	Hellenic AC (2)	5–0	Palmerston Rovers (2)
NT	ASP	18	Verdi FC (-)	3–0	Alice Springs Celtic (-)
Queensland
QLD	BNE	19	Peninsula Power (3)	3–0	Brisbane Strikers (2)
QLD	BNE	20	Moreton Bay United (2)	2–3†	Olympic FC (2)
QLD	BNE	21	Queensland Lions (2)	0–0†	Rochedale Rovers (3)
Queensland Lions advance 4–3 on penalties.

Fed	Zone	Tie no	Home team (Tier)	Score	Away team (Tier)
QLD	BNE	22	Logan Lightning (3)	1–4	Brisbane City (2)
QLD	FNQ v NQ	23	North Queensland United (2)	0–3	Cairns FC (2)
QLD	CQ v MRF	24	Bluebirds United (4)	1–4	Magpies Crusaders United (2)
QLD	SC v WB	25	Doon Villa (4)	0–1	Sunshine Coast (2)
QLD	GC v SWQ	26	South West Queensland Thunder (2)	1–2	Gold Coast Knights (4)
South Australia
SA	–	27	Cumberland United (3)	2–3	Adelaide Comets (2)
SA	–	28	Modbury Jets (3)	0–1	Croydon Kings (2)
Tasmania
TAS	–	29	Northern Rangers (2)	1–2	Devonport City (2)
TAS	–	30	Launceston City (2)	1–3	South Hobart (2)
Victoria
VIC	–	31	Whittlesea Ranges (3)	0–1	Altona Magic (3)
VIC	–	32	Richmond SC (4)	2–1†	Hume City (2)
VIC	–	33	Goulburn Valley Suns (3)	1–3	Bentleigh Greens (2)
VIC	–	35	Northcote City (2)	1–0	Murray United (3)
VIC	–	35	Moreland Zebras (3)	2–0	Mornington (4)
VIC	–	36	Oakleigh Cannons (2)	1–2	Kingston City (2)
VIC	–	37	North Sunshine Eagles (4)	0–4	Avondale (2)
VIC	–	38	Port Melbourne (2)	2–0	Whittlesea United (5)
Western Australia
WA	–	39	ECU Joondalup (2)	5–0	Forrestfield United (2)
WA	–	40	Armadale (2)	5–2	Dianella White Eagles (3)
WA	–	41	Gwelup Croatia (3)	2–1†	Subiaco AFC (2)
WA	–	42	Floreat Athena (2)	1–1†	Perth (2)
Floreat Athena advance 4–3 on penalties.

Notes

- w/o = Walkover
- † = After Extra Time

== Seventh round ==
Fed	Zone	Tie no	Home team (Tier)	Score	Away team (Tier)
Australian Capital Territory
ACT	–	1	Gungahlin United (2)	2–3	Canberra FC (2)
New South Wales
NSW	–	2	Sydney Olympic (2)	0–3	APIA Leichhardt Tigers (2)
NSW	–	3	Tarrawanna Blueys (6)	0–4	Hakoah Sydney City East (2)
NSW	–	4	Hills Brumbies FC (3)	1–2	Bonnyrigg White Eagles (2)
NSW	–	5	Rockdale City Suns (2)	3–2	Blacktown City (2)
NSW	–	6	Marconi Stallions (2)	2–1	Spirit FC (3)
Northern New South Wales
NNSW	–	7	Charlestown City Blues (2)	0–0†	Lambton Jaffas (2)
Charleston City Blues advance 3–2 on penalties.
NNSW	–	8	Broadmeadow Magic (2)	2–1	Hamilton Olympic (2)
Northern Territory
NT	DAR v ASP	9	Hellenic AC (2)	9–0	Verdi FC (-)
Queensland
QLD	BNE	10	Brisbane City (2)	2–2†	Olympic FC (2)
Olympic FC advance 4–1 on penalties.

Fed	Zone	Tie no	Home team (Tier)	Score	Away team (Tier)
QLD	BNE	11	Queensland Lions (2)	6–0	Peninsula Power (3)
QLD	NQL	12	Cairns FC (2)	5–3	Magpies Crusaders United (2)
QLD	SQL	13	Sunshine Coast (2)	2–3†	Gold Coast Knights (4)
South Australia
SA	–	14	Adelaide Comets (2)	2–1	Croydon Kings (2)
Tasmania
TAS	–	15	Devonport City (2)	1–0	South Hobart (2)
Victoria
VIC	–	16	Avondale (2)	4–1	Richmond SC (4)
VIC	–	17	Kingston City (2)	0–4	Bentleigh Greens (2)
VIC	–	18	Port Melbourne (2)	4–3†	Moreland Zebras (3)
VIC	–	19	Altona Magic (3)	0–2	Northcote City (2)
Western Australia
WA	–	20	Gwelup Croatia (3)	4–1	Floreat Athena (2)
WA	–	21	Armadale (2)	3–2	ECU Joondalup (2)

Notes

- † = After Extra Time
