= Fountaindale =

- Suburb
- Interactive map of Fountaindale
- Coordinates: 33°20′24″S 151°23′33.6″E
- Country: Australia
- State: New South Wales
- City: Central Coast
- LGA: Central Coast Council
- Location: 9 km (5.6 mi) S of Wyong

Government
  - State electorate: The Entrance
  - Federal division: Dobell

Population
  - Total: 631 (2011 census)
- Postcode: 2258
- Parish: Tuggerah
Suburbs around Fountaindale
Kangy Angy	Berkeley Vale	Berkeley Vale
Ourimbah	Fountaindale	Glenning Valley
Ourimbah	Ourimbah	Tumbi Umbi

Fountaindale is a semi-rural suburb of the Central Coast region of New South Wales, Australia. It is part of the Central Coast Council local government area.

Fountaindale is also the location of a Rudolf Steiner School, which moved from North Gosford. This school has benefited the community with a new roundabout as well as other road repairs and upgrades.
