= Glenning Valley =

- Suburb
- Coordinates: 33°20′53″S 151°25′05″E
- Country: Australia
- State: New South Wales
- City: Central Coast
- LGA: Central Coast Council
- Location: 7 km (4.3 mi) S of Wyong; 10 km (6.2 mi) W of The Entrance

Government
  - State electorate: The Entrance
  - Federal division: Dobell

Population
  - Total: 2,050 (2011 census)
- Postcode: 2261
- Parish: Munmorah
Suburbs around Glenning Valley
Fountaindale	Tuggerah	Chittaway Bay
Fountaindale	Glenning Valley	Berkeley Vale
Fountaindale	Tumbi Umbi	Tumbi Umbi

Glenning Valley is a suburb of the Central Coast region of New South Wales, Australia, located between The Entrance and Wyong. It is part of the Central Coast Council local government area. Virginia Giuffre, a prominent victim of the paedophile Jeffrey Epstein, lived in the suburb for eleven years.
