= Chittaway Point =

- Suburb
- Coordinates: 33°18′54″S 151°27′04″E
- Country: Australia
- State: New South Wales
- City: Central Coast
- LGA: Central Coast Council
- Location: 6 km (3.7 mi) SE of Wyong

Government
  - State electorate: Wyong
  - Federal division: Dobell

Area
  - Total: 1.5 km^{2} (0.58 sq mi)

Population
  - Total: 941 (2016 census)
  - Density: 627/km^{2} (1,620/sq mi)
- Postcode: 2261
- Parish: Tuggerah
Suburbs around Chittaway Point
Tuggerah	Tuggerah	Tuggerah Lake
Tuggerah	Chittaway Point
	Chittaway Bay

Chittaway Point is a suburb of the Central Coast region of New South Wales, Australia. It is part of the Central Coast Council local government area.
