= Killarney District SC =

Killarney District
- Full name: Killarney District Soccer Club
- Nickname: The Terriers
- Founded: 1972
- Ground: EDSACC Oval
- Chairman: Matthew Gale
- Manager: Peter Preston
- League: Central Coast Premier League
- 2022: 1st
- Website: https://killarneysoccer.com.au/
Home colours

Killarney District Soccer Club is an Australian football club based in Bateau Bay, a suburb on the Central Coast of New South Wales, Australia. The club currently competes in the Central Coast Premier League.

== History ==
Killarney District SC was founded in 1972. The club first won silverware in 1999, winning the Association Cup, and in 2003 winning the League Grand Final.

The clubs main success has come in recent years however with 6 straight League Championships from 2016 to 2022 and 4 straight Grand Final Premierships from 2016 to 2019, both Central Coast Premier League records. It also achieved a treble in 2016.

In 2022, Killarney broke history in the Premier League by completing the regular season with 18 wins out of 18, becoming the first club on the Central Coast to achieve this.

The club has also participated in the Australia Cup qualifying rounds 4 times and are somewhat of a giant killer, defeating NSW NPL outfits on several occasions, namely Stanmore Hawks and Mt Druitt Town Rangers in the 2016 competition and Blacktown Spartans in the 2017 competition. Killarney is the only club from Central Coast Football to have made the sixth preliminary round in the cup, just two wins away from the national rounds.

== Honours ==
=== Senior ===
==== League ====
- Central Coast Premier League League Champions
  - Winners: 2013, 2016, 2017, 2018, 2019, 2020, 2022, 2023
  - Runners-up: 2003
  Central Coast Premier League Grand Final Premiers
  - Winners: 2003, 2016, 2017, 2018, 2019, 2023
  - Runners-up: 2020, 2022
  Central Coast Football Division 1/Premier League 2 League Champions
  - Winners: 1990, 1993, 2001
  - Runners-up: 1988, 1989, 2010
  Central Coast Football Division 1/Premier League 2 Grand Final Premiers
  - Winners: 1988, 1989, 2001, 2010
  - Runners-up: 1990, 1993, 2008

==== Cup ====
- Central Coast Football Association Cup Champions
  - Winners: 1999, 2016
  - Runners-up: 1983

=== Junior ===
- Jack Atkins Trophy
  - Winners: 1978, 1980, 1981, 1997, 2002, 2011, 2020
  Bill Pluim Trophy
  - Winners: 1991, 1993, 1994, 1995, 1996, 1997, 1998, 1999, 2000, 2001, 2002, 2003, 2004, 2005, 2010, 2013, 2014

== Seasons ==
Season	League										Cup	Assc. Cup	Top goalscorer(s)	
Season	Division	P	W	D	L	GF	GA	Pts	Pos	Finals	Cup	Assc. Cup	Player(s)	Goals
1972	Junior Leagues Only													
1973	Div 1 (7)	14	5	4	5	23	19	14	5th	–	N/A	N/A	?	?
1974	Div 1 (7)	15	3	2	10	22	44	8	7th	–	N/A	N/A	?	?
1975	Div 1 (8)	21	2	4	15	26	72	8	7th	–	N/A		?	?
1976	Div 1 (8)	18	3	3	12	15	65	9	9th	–	N/A			
1977	Div 1 (9)	14	1	5	8	5	33	7	8th ↓	–	–			
1978	Div 2 (10)								7th↑	–	–			
1979	Div 1 (9)	22	4	5	13	19	58	13	10th	–	–			
1980	Div 1 (9)	20	7	4	9	28	43	18	6th	–	–			
1981 (Note: In 1981, Division 1 was renamed to the Central Coast Premier League while Div 2 became Div 1.)	CCPL (9)	13	4	2	7	19	27	10	6th	–	–			
1982	CCPL (10)	14	4	1	9	18	35	9	7th	–	–			
1983	CCPL (10)	18	11	3	4	39	22	25	3rd	PF	–	RU		
1984	CCPL (10)								5th	–	–			
1985	CCPL (10)								9th	–	–			
1986	CCPL (10)								8th	–	–			
1987	CCPL (9)								10th ↓	–	–			
1988	Div 1 (10)								2nd	W	–			
1989	Div 1 (10)								2nd	W	–			
1990	Div 1 (10)								1st ↑	RU	–			
1991	CCPL (9)								10th ↓	–	–			
1992	Div 1 (10)								4th	SF	–			
1993	Div 1 (10)								1st ↑	RU	–			
1994	CCPL (9)								4th	SF	–			
1995	CCPL (9)								7th	–	–			
1996	CCPL (9)								6th	–	–			
1997	CCPL (8)								7th ↓	–	–			
1998	CCPL2 (9)								4th	SF	N/A			
1999	CCPL2 (9)								4th	SF	N/A	W		
2000	CCPL2 (9)								4th	SF	N/A			
2001	CCPL2 (9)								1st ↑	W	N/A			
2002	CCPL (8)								5th	–	N/A	RU		
2003	CCPL (7)								2nd	W	N/A			
2004	CCPL (6)								8th	–	N/A			
2005	CCPL (6)								6th	–	N/A			
2006	CCPL (7)								4th	PF	N/A			
2007	CCPL (6)	18	2	5	11	23	47	11	10th ↓	–	N/A	RU		
2008	Div 1 (7)								3rd	RU	N/A			
2009	Div 1 (7)								3rd	PF	N/A			
2010	Div 1 (7)								2nd ↑	W	N/A			
2011	CCPL (6)	18	7	5	5	26	25	26	5th	–	N/A			
2012	CCPL (6)	18	11	1	6	44	31	34	4th	RU	N/A			
2013	CCPL (6)	18	12	6	0	36	14	42	1st	PF	N/A			
2014	CCPL (6)	18	11	4	3	46	27	37	4th	SF	–			
2015	CCPL (6)	18	10	3	5	44	22	33	3rd	SF	–			
2016	CCPL (6)	18	16	2	0	64	23	50	1st	W	PR6	W	Tim Knight	23
2017	CCPL (6)	18	12	4	2	43	19	40	1st	W	PR5			
2018	CCPL (6)	22	16	5	1	68	20	53	1st	W	PR5			
2019	CCPL (6)	22	15	3	4	67	26	48	1st	W	PR5			
2020	CCPL (6)								1st	RU	N/A		Daniel Rodger	20
2021	CCPL (6)	N/A									–	RU		
2022	CCPL (6)	18	18	0	0	56	10	54	1st	RU	–	GS	Adam Woodbine	13
2023	CCPL (5)	18	13	4	1	?	?	43	1st	W	–	GS		
2023	CCPL (5)	0	0	0	0	0	0	0						
2024	CCPL (5)	0	0	0	0	0	0	0						
2025	CCPL (5)	18	5	4	9	29	35	19	6th	–				
2026	CCPL (5)	0	0	0	0	0	0	0						
