= Kangy Angy =

- Suburb
- Interactive map of Kangy Angy
- Coordinates: 33°19′26″S 151°23′6″E
- Country: Australia
- State: New South Wales
- City: Central Coast
- LGA: Central Coast Council
- Location: 6 km (3.7 mi) SSW of Wyong; 16 km (9.9 mi) N of Gosford; 84 km (52 mi) N of Sydney; 71 km (44 mi) SSW of Newcastle; 16 km (9.9 mi) W of The Entrance

Government
  - State electorates: Wyong; The Entrance
  - Federal division: Dobell
- Elevation: 18 m (59 ft)

Population
  - Total: 331 (SAL 2021)
- Postcode: 2258
- Parish: Tuggerah
Suburbs around Kangy Angy
Tuggerah	Tuggerah	Tuggerah
Ourimbah	Kangy Angy	Berkeley Vale
Palmdale	Ourimbah	Fountaindale

Kangy Angy (/kæŋi æŋi/) is a semi-rural suburb of the Central Coast region of New South Wales, Australia. It is in a small valley along Ourimbah Creek and the Pacific Highway. It is part of the Central Coast Council local government area.

Home to a section of the convict built Great North Road, the area remained important as a hill crossing between Sydney and Newcastle until large scale earthworks permitted the development of more direct roads and highways.

Nowadays it is home to several small farms and pasture used for agistment. The valley is bordered by state forest to the north and west and the Sydney–Newcastle railway line to the south-east. Koalas, grey wallabies, echidnas, wombats, sugar gliders, and many bird and reptile species have been documented in the undeveloped forest of the valley. Some isolated patches of temperate rainforest add diversity to the nature of the valley. The Kangy Angy Maintenance Centre maintains the NSW TrainLink D sets.

== Transport ==
Busways operates two bus routes through Kangy Angy:

- 36: Gosford to Tuggerah via Narara, Niagara Park, Lisarow and Ourimbah
- 37: Gosford to Tuggerah via Wyoming, Niagara Park, Lisarow and Ourimbah
