= Berkeley Vale, New South Wales =

Berkeley Vale
- Suburb
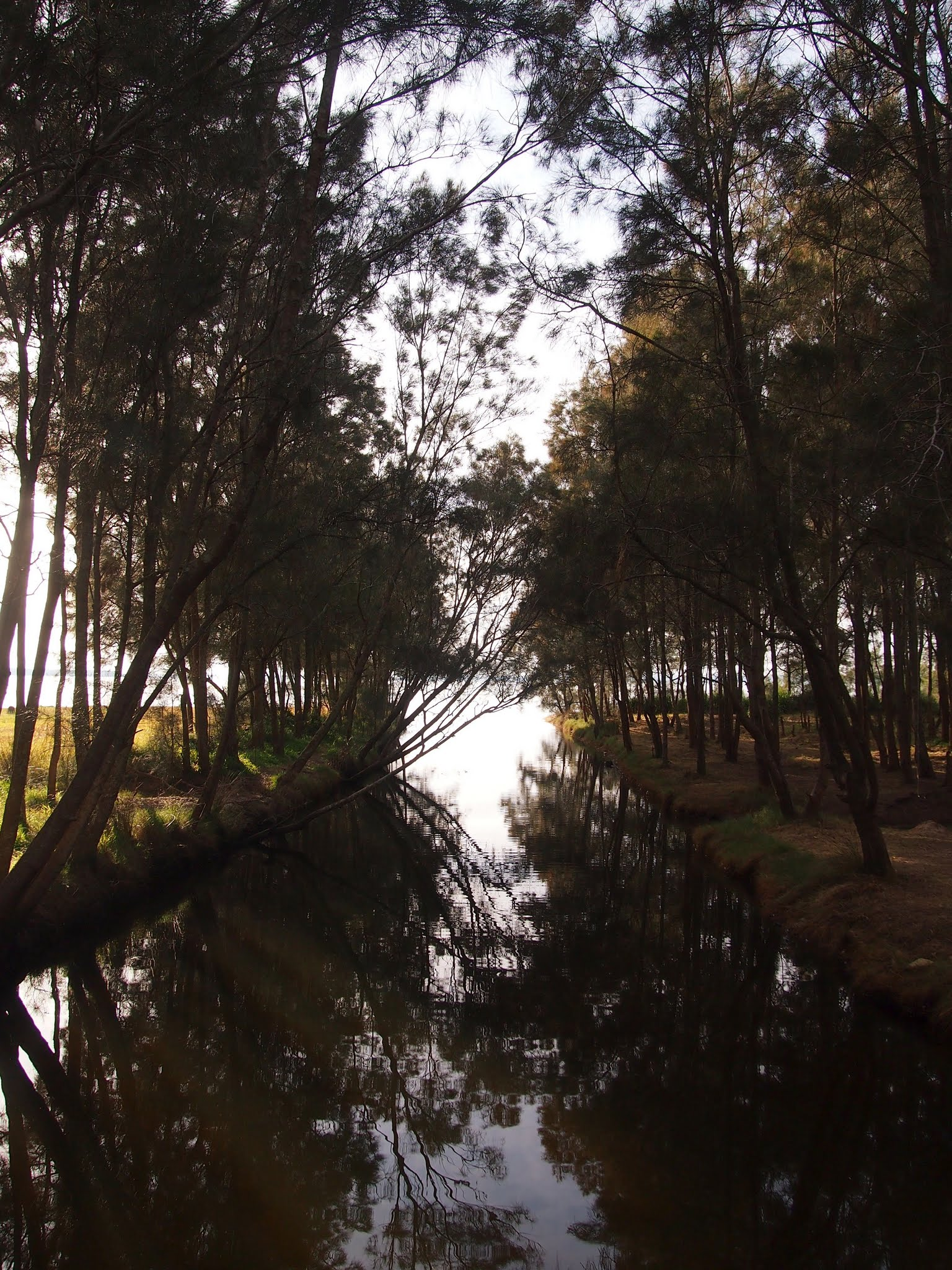

- Interactive map of Berkeley Vale
- Coordinates: 33°20′24″S 151°26′6″E
- Country: Australia
- State: New South Wales
- City: Central Coast
- LGA: Central Coast Council
- Location: 9 km (5.6 mi) W of The Entrance; 8 km (5.0 mi) SSE of Wyong; 19 km (12 mi) N of Gosford; 75 km (47 mi) SSW of Newcastle; 98 km (61 mi) NNE of Sydney

Government
  - State electorates: Wyong; The Entrance
  - Federal division: Dobell

Area
  - Total: 4 km^{2} (1.5 sq mi)
- Elevation: 8 m (26 ft)

Population
  - Total: 8,355 (2016 census)
  - Density: 2,090/km^{2} (5,400/sq mi)
- Postcode: 2261
- Parish: Tuggerah
Suburbs around Berkeley Vale
Kangy Angy	Chittaway Bay
Fountaindale	Berkeley Vale	Tuggerah Lake
Glenning Valley	Tumbi Umbi	Killarney Vale

Berkeley Vale is a suburb of the Central Coast region of New South Wales, Australia. Berkeley Vale is commuting distance from Sydney. It is part of the Central Coast Council local government area and part of the federal division of Dobell.

Wyong Road is the main road that runs through Berkeley Vale. Berkeley Vale contains two public schools – Berkeley Vale Campus, which is a part of Tuggerah Lakes Secondary College, and Berkeley Vale Public School.

There is a private hospital and a retirement village on the lake side of Wyong Road. Youth activities available include 1st Berkeley Vale Scout Group.

Berkeley Vale is home to the Berkeley Vale "Panthers" Rugby League Football Club and the Berkeley Vale "Wombats" Soccer Club.

== Population ==
According to the 2016 census of Population, there were 8,355 people in Berkeley Vale.

- Aboriginal and Torres Strait Islander people made up 4.3% of the population.
- 84.9% of people were born in Australia. The next most common countries of birth were England 3.8% and New Zealand 1.8%.
- 92.8% of people only spoke English at home.
- The most common responses for religion were No Religion 28.9%, Catholic 25.6%, Anglican 24.2%, Not stated 6.8% and Uniting Church 2.6%.
