= Chittaway Bay, New South Wales =

Chittaway Bay
- Suburb
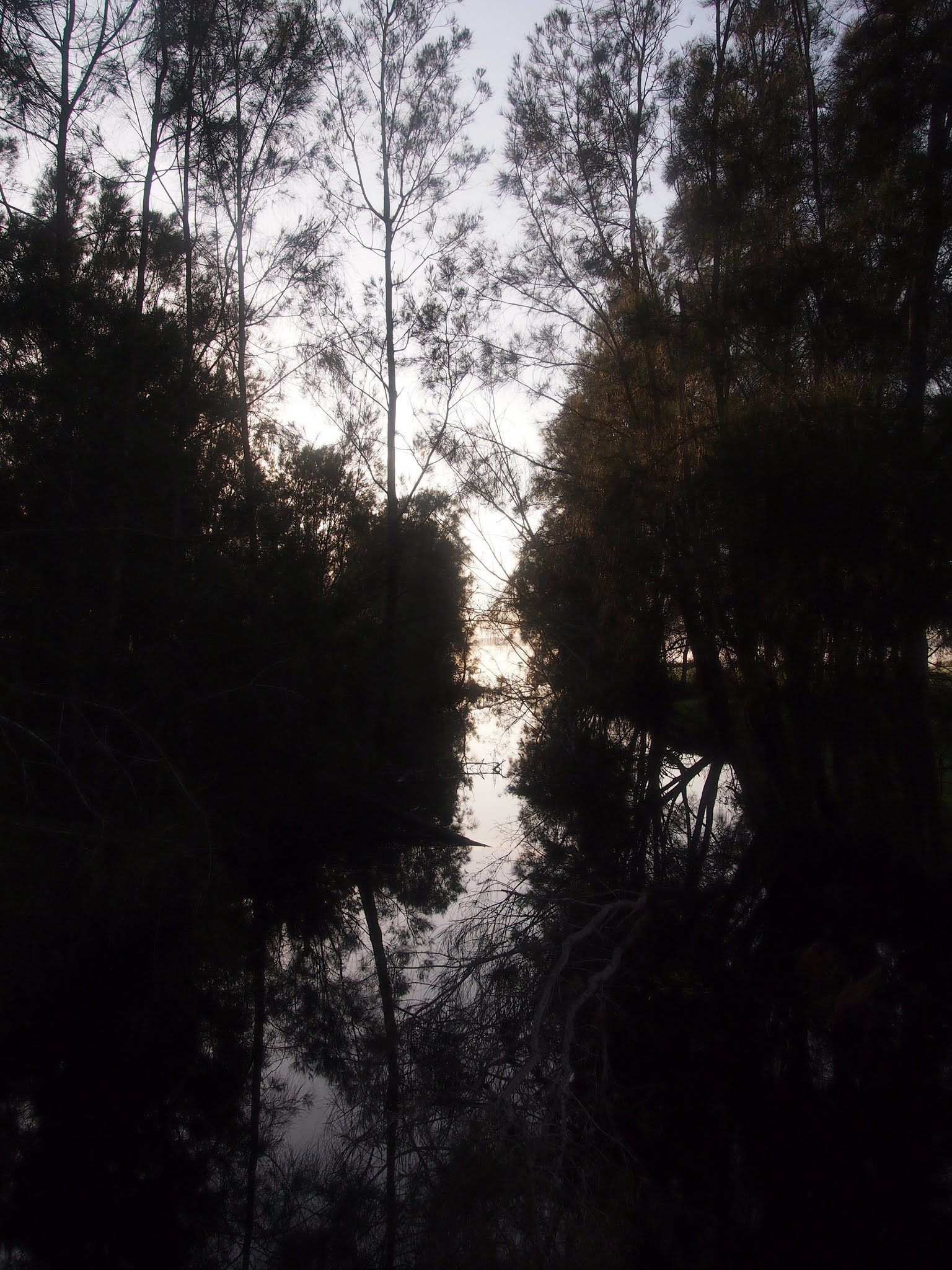

- Interactive map of Chittaway Bay
- Coordinates: 33°19′55″S 151°27′04″E
- Country: Australia
- State: New South Wales
- City: Central Coast
- LGA: Central Coast Council
- Location: 6 km (3.7 mi) SSE of Wyong

Government
  - State electorate: Wyong
  - Federal division: Dobell

Area
  - Total: 1.2 km^{2} (0.46 sq mi)

Population
  - Total: 1,987 (SAL 2021)
- Postcode: 2261
- Parish: Tuggerah
Suburbs around Chittaway Bay
Kangy Angy	Chittaway Point	Chittaway Point
Berkeley Vale	Chittaway Bay
Berkeley Vale	Berkeley Vale	Tuggerah Lake

Chittaway Bay is a suburb of the Central Coast region of New South Wales, Australia. It is part of the Central Coast Council local government area.

The main road through the suburb, Chittaway Road, has on it a four star motel, service station, and a shopping centre known as Chittaway Centre, it also has a pub called Chittaway Bay Tavern, but more commonly known to locals as "The Tav".

== Population ==
According to the 2021 census, there were 1,987 people in Chittaway Bay.

- Aboriginal and Torres Strait Islander people made up 4.8% of the population.
- 83.9% of people were born in Australia; the next most common counties of birth included England at 4.1%, New Zealand at 1.5%, Scotland at 0.6%, India at 0.6%, and Thailand at 0.6%. 90.8% of people spoke only English at home; the next most common languages spoken at home included Spanish at 0.9%, Cantonese at 0.8%, Malayalam at 0.7%, Thai at 0.4%, and French at 0.4%.
- The most common responses for religion included No Religion at 39.0%, Catholic at 22.2%, Anglican at 20.9, and Uniting Church at 2.2%; a further 4.5% of respondents for this area elected not to disclose their religious status.
