= Sydney CBD FC =

Sydney CBD
- Full name: Sydney CBD Football Club
- Nickname: The D's
- Founded: 2014 (as Team CBD)
- Ground: The Domain Fields, Sydney
- Coach: Leighton Robins
- League: Eastern Suburbs Football Association
- Website: http://sydneycbdfc.com.au/
Home colours	Away colours

Sydney CBD FC is an association football club based in Sydney CBD, New South Wales, Australia. The club was formed in 2014 as Team CBD, but changed their name after just one season. The club currently competes in the Eastern Suburbs Football Association (ESFA).

== History ==
In 2014, they managed to qualify for 3 major finals in their first ever season in the Sydney Amateur Football Association. Their first grade narrowly lost 0–2 to Leichhardt Saints FC in the premier division Grand Final, whilst losing 0–5 in the reserve grade Grand Final to Iraqi Lions. Two weeks later the first grade finished on top of a nine-goal thriller with Balmain Wanderers FC to lift the Sydney Amateur Cup. It was the first time the Sydney Amateur Football League saw any one club in both the first division Grand Final and first division Amateur Cup final in the same season in their 68-year history. Sydney CBD played their 2014 home games at Wentworth Park, but with no official training ground.

The 2015 season saw a change in home ground to the Domain Fields, adjacent to the Royal Botanic Gardens. They entered into the preliminary rounds of the 2015 FFA Cup, and in their only game were defeated 0–3 in the Fourth Round by Woonona FC.

They joined the Eastern Suburbs Football Association from the 2016 season onwards.
