= Tumbi Umbi =

- Suburb
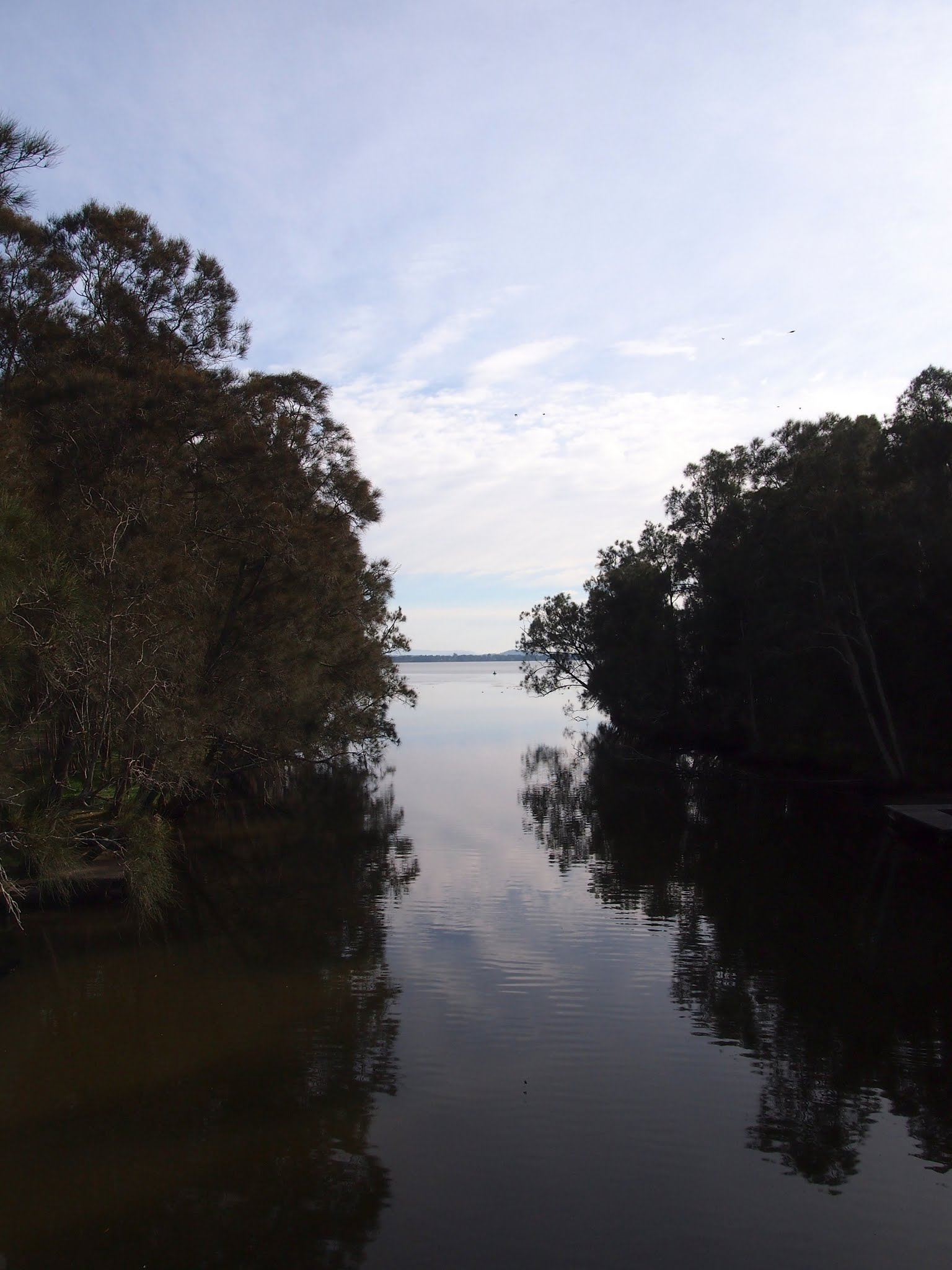
- Tumbi Umbi Creek

- Interactive map of Tumbi Umbi
- Coordinates: 33.365°S 151.443°E
- Country: Australia
- State: New South Wales
- City: Central Coast
- LGA: Central Coast Council
- Location: 7 km (4.3 mi) SW of The Entrance; 11 km (6.8 mi) N of Terrigal; 20 km (12 mi) ENE of Gosford; 77 km (48 mi) SSW of Newcastle; 110 km (68 mi) NNE of Sydney

Government
  - State electorates: The Entrance; Terrigal
  - Federal division: Dobell
- Elevation: 7 m (23 ft)

Population
  - Total: 5,369 (2021 census)
- Postcode: 2261
- Parish: Tuggerah
Suburbs around Tumbi Umbi
Glenning Valley	Berkeley Vale	Killarney Vale
Ourimbah	Tumbi Umbi	Bateau Bay
Holgate	Matcham	Forresters Beach, Wamberal

Tumbi Umbi is a mostly semi-rural suburb of the Central Coast region of New South Wales, Australia, located northwest of Bateau Bay along Wyong Road. It is part of the Central Coast Council local government area.

== Geography ==
It is a distributed community on the shores of Tuggerah Lake and associated with the creek that feeds into that body of water. In Aboriginal times, the description "A place of Tall Trees" accurately described the swamp land that has now been extensively drained and populated with housing, industrial estates, a school, Mingara Recreation Club, Mingara One Fitness and Aquatic Centre, a pistol range and Glengara Retirement Village.

The more urbanised part of the suburb can be found along Wyong Road adjacent to Berkeley Vale, Killarney Vale, and Bateau Bay. The more rural part is situated around Tumbi Road and Palm Valley Road, adjacent to Glenning Valley, Wamberal and Forresters Beach.

It is situated a short distance from the coast.
