= Brown Lake (Stradbroke Island) =

Lake in Queensland, Australia

- Bummeria
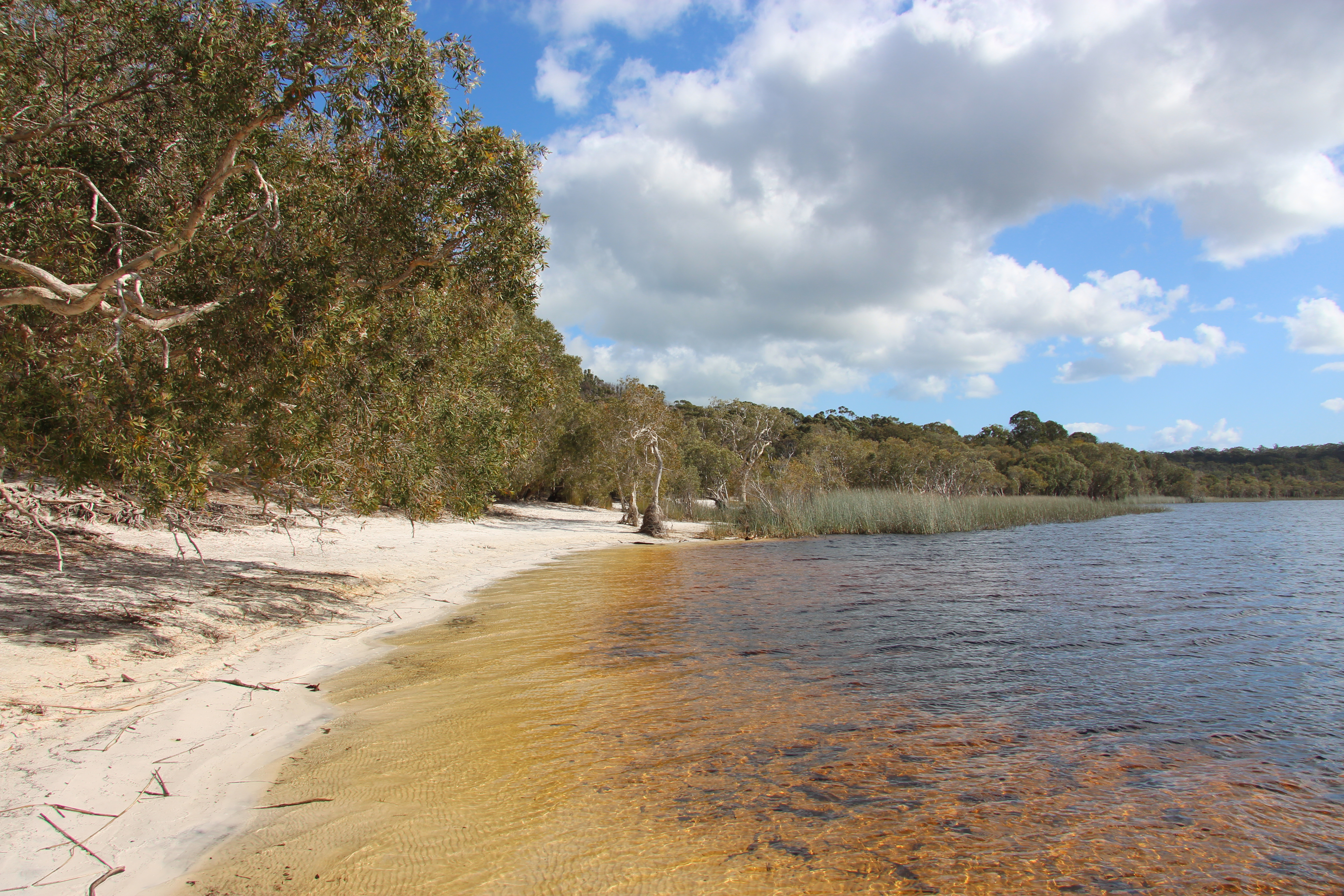

- Location within Queensland
- Location: North Stradbroke Island, Queensland
- Coordinates: 27°29′24″S 153°25′57″E
- Type: Perched
- Primary inflows: Precipitation
- Basin countries: Australia
- Max. length: 1 km (0.62 mi)
- Settlements: Dunwich, Amity, Point Lookout

Brown Lake (Bummeria) is a perched lake on North Stradbroke Island, in South-East Queensland, Australia. The ecosystem is an example of a coastal non-floodplain sand lake and is characterised by acidic water, nutrient-poor and sandy soil, shrub-like vegetation and wet heathland.

Brown Lake is of geographical significance, possessing ecological value. The geomorphology of the ecosystem is representative of the unique parabolic dune ridge systems that formed during the Pleistocene epoch. As a perched lake, the hydrological operations of Brown Lake are highly diverse and complex.

The lake is also of cultural significance to the Aboriginal population of North Stradbroke Island, the Quandamooka people, as they possess a spiritual and physical relationship with the ecosystem. The Indigenous population care for and protect the landscape, sharing traditional environmental management knowledge.

Brown Lake’s cultural heritage and ecological value, along with the environmental damage associated with tourism, has led to increased conservation. The Queensland Government and the Quandamooka Yoolooburrabee Aboriginal Corporation (QYAC) have proposed an improved environmental management plan, combining traditional and contemporary management practices.

== Geography ==
Brown Lake is 1 km in length and is located 4 km east of Dunwich, a small town on North Stradbroke Island. Brown Lake is in a subtropical climatic region; experiencing a wet season in the winter and a dry season in the summer. The mean daily temperature for the area is "15°–29°C in summer and 9°–20°C in winter" and the average annual rainfall is 1668 mm.

Geologically, Brown Lake exists on a parabolic beach ridge system that formed during the Quaternary glacial and interglacial cycles of the Pleistocene epoch. The cold-climate interval of the epoch caused a periodic lower sea level, which exposed the sea-bed of the coastal heathland to strong south-easterly winds that carried and deposited sediment which eventually accumulated to form the dune ridges on which Brown Lake developed.

Perched lakes are formed via geological processes. They occur in sunken landforms (depressions) when an impermeable layer of sand, combined with decomposed organic material, becomes cemented as precipitates of mineral matter fill in pore spaces; transforming sediment into rock. This cemented layer is known as 'coffee rock' and it prevents rainwater from escaping the depression, percolating through to the regional aquifer, forming a perched lake.

The sand at Brown Lake is quartz sand and the yellow-brown colouring of the sand is caused by the sesquioxide coating on the quartz grains. Podzol soil supports the health and growth of the vegetation at Brown Lake. Developed from quartz-rich sand, podzol soil is sandy in texture and is characterised as a well-aerated, well-drained and acidic soil. The soil is also nutrient deficient, which is largely due to leaching.

== Localities around Brown Lake ==
Encompassing Brown Lake are three townships; Dunwich, Amity and Point Lookout.

| City | Population |
|---|---|
| Dunwich | 885 |
| Amity | 387 |
| Point Lookout | 713 |

== Hydrology ==
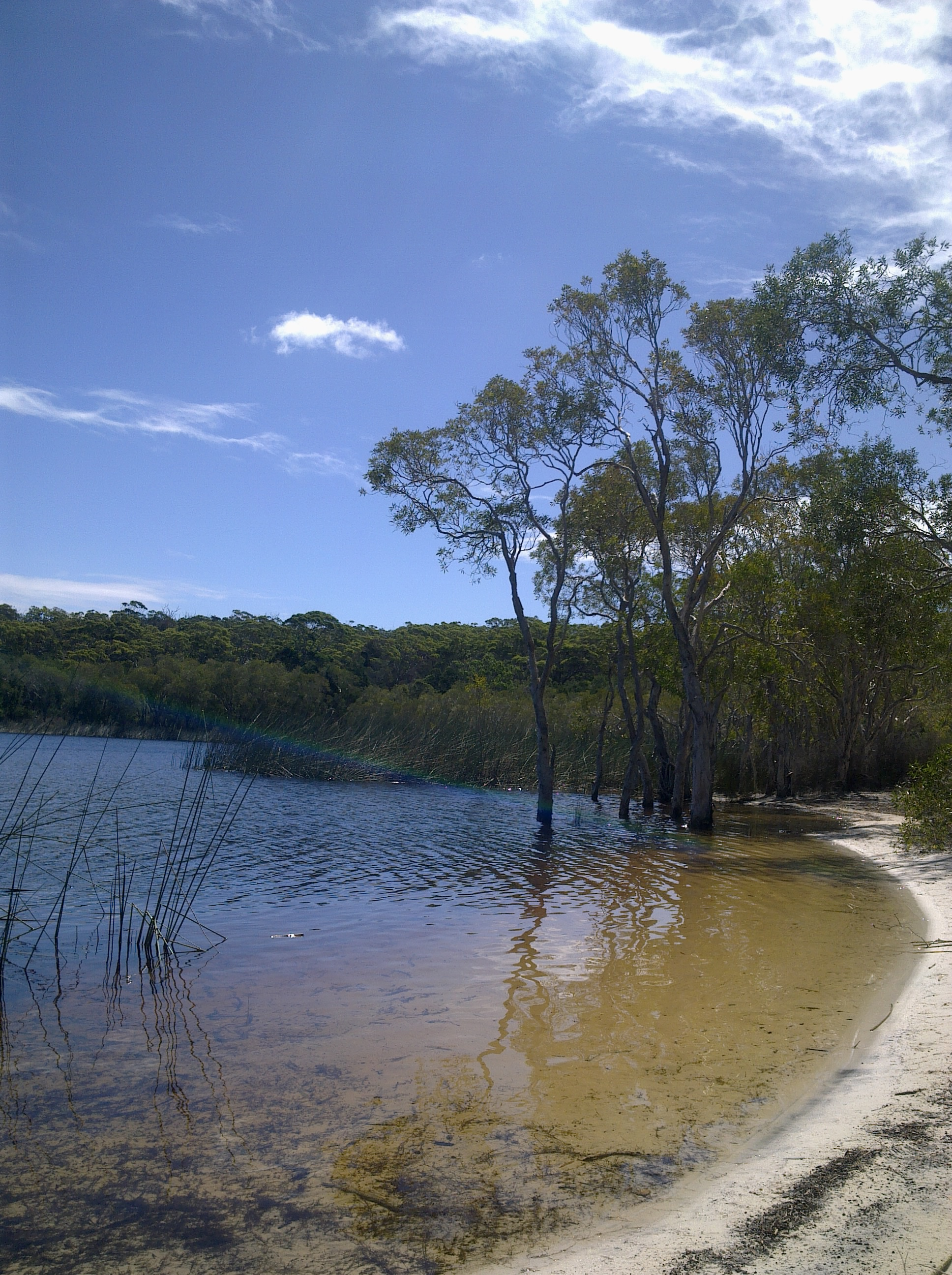
Brownish, tea-colour of Brown Lake's water

As a perched lake, Brown Lake contains high levels of dissolved organic matter, resulting in the water system being acidic in nature; possessing a PH level less than 6. The high level of dissolved organic content contributes to the water colour of Brown Lake; staining the lake a brownish tea colour; characterising the lake as dystrophic.

Water systems receive nutrients from the sediment surrounding the ecosystem and at Brown Lake, the sand and soil that support the ecological community possess a low nutrient supply; characterising the lake as oligotrophic.

Perched lakes are recharged and replenished via rainfall infiltration. Accordingly, pro-longed periods of low rainfall often lead to decreased water levels however, studies show that Brown Lake’s water level has been relatively stable; remaining at a normative level due to the large rainfall infiltration that occurred during the January 1975 cyclonic event. The small fluctuation in water level that does occur at Brown lake is most likely a result of water seeping through the lakebed.

== Aquatic fauna ==
Brown Lake supports a diverse population of aquatic fauna; inhabiting macroinvertebrates, fish and decapod crustacea. The taxa of aquatic biota occupying the ecosystem are of conservation significance, as they are representative of rare acid-adapted marine life existing in humic water systems.

=== Macro-invertebrates ===
Macro-invertebrates inhabiting the area include:

- Acarina
- Aeshnidae
- Atyidae
- Baetidae
- Calamoceratidae
- Ceratopogonidae
- Chaoboridae
- Cladocera
- Coenagrionidae
- Copepoda
- Corixidae
- Dugesiidae
- Dytiscidae
- Gerridae
- Gomphidae
- Hydroptilidae
- Leptoceridae
- Lestidae
- Libellulidae
- Limnichidae
- Mesoveliidae
- Nepidae
- Notonectidae
- Orthetrum boumiera
- Chironominae
- Tanypodinae

==== Fish ====
- Gambusia holbrooki (small, non-indigenous fish)
- Hypseleotris galii (a native gudgeon)

===== Decapod crustacea =====
- Caridina indistincta C1

== Flora ==
The vegetation surrounding Brown Lake is composed of riparian grass and small plant species; characterising the ecosystem as a coastal wet heathland and shrub-dominated area however, there is some presence of larger trees.

Flora supported by the ecosystem include:

- Gahnia sieberiana
- Empodisma minus
- Gleichenia spp.
- Blechnum indicum
- Lepironia articulata
- Baumea spp.
- Juncus spp.
- Eleocharis spp.

== Natural history ==
=== Fish migration ===
Up until 10 years ago, Brown Lake was a fish-less wetland. Both natural and physical disruptions to the ecosystem have contributed to two fish species migrating to the lake; the Gambusia holbrooki and Hypseleotris galii.

A natural disruption that has contributed to the migration of the fish species is Charles Darwin's (1882) 'duck feet theory'. The concept posits that eggs belonging to marine life can be transported from one ecosystem to another via plant material that has become attached to a waterbird's feet or mouth; depositing eggs as they roam between wetlands. Natural hydrological processes have also contributed to the fish migrating to Brown Lake. Storm events and major flooding can often force egg dispersal, as bodies of water transport and deposit colonists.

Physical disruptions that have contributed to the fish species migrating to Brown Lake are associated with human activity. The recreational boating that occurs at Brown Lake is a contributing factor to fish migration, as boats passing through the ecosystem that have visited other water systems on North Stradbroke Island either accidentally or deliberately transport eggs and live cargo into the lake. In 2014 a large bushfire occurred near Brown Lake and a fire-fighter helicopter landed at the ecosystem to suck up water; utilising the lake as a source for water bombs to extinguish the fire. It is theorised that this helicopter accidentally deposited live fish into Brown Lake from its last filling point.

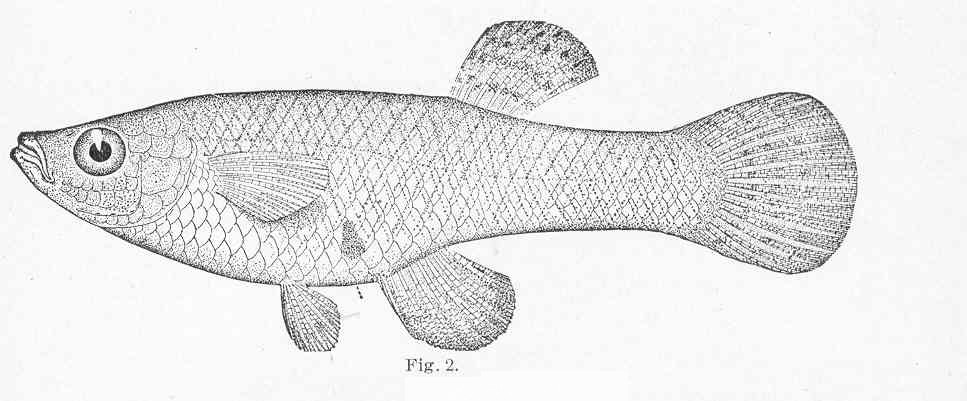
Female Gambusia holbrooki

==== Invasive species ====
In the 1920s the Gambusia holbrooki was known for its ability to control mosquito populations and consequently, the species was deliberately released into South-East Queensland waters. Contemporary research revealed that the species' mosquito-repelling ability was no greater than the native marine life that fed on the insect; classifying the fish as a pest. The introduction of this pest species is impacting the aquatic fauna at Brown Lake through competition and predation; threatening the biodiversity and equilibrium of the ecosystem.

===== Lepironia articulata =====
The Lepironia articulata, commonly referred to as grey sedge, is a perennial grass-like plant that typically encompasses lake systems; forming a dense and thick swards. The flower on the plant is reddish-brown in colour, cylindrical in shape and points sideways. The species plays a significant role in the functioning of the Brown Lake ecosystem, as the submerged parts of Lepironia articulata provide a habitat for the macroinvertebrates and fish present at Brown lake. Also, decaying Lepironia articulata is a valuable food source for Brown Lake's fauna.

== Aboriginal significance ==
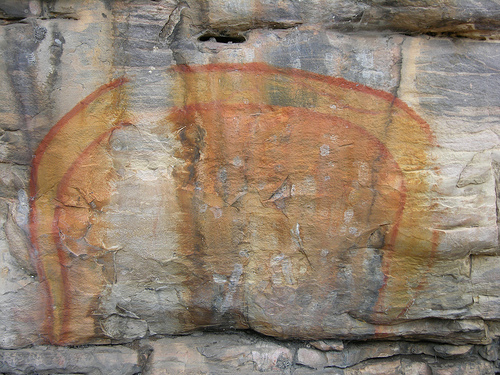
Australian Aboriginal rock painting of "The Rainbow Serpent"

Brown Lake (Bummiera) is of cultural significance to the Indigenous population of North Stradbroke Island, the Quandamooka people, as they possess a spiritual and physical relationship to the ecosystem; engaging with the landscape through ritual activities, beliefs and values which have been passed down and maintained through Law and the Dreaming. In fact, the Quandamooka Yoolooburrabee Aboriginal Corporation (QYAC) describes the lake as "one of the most spiritual and sacred places for the Quandamooka People". The Aboriginal people of the Brown Lake area, the Quandamooka people, associate the area very strongly with women and children; only women can speak for Brown Lake and women are responsible by Law to care for manage the lake and its resources. Brown Lake is also a ceremonial place at which women-only, ritualistic activities take place. For example, the Rainbow Serpent, which is a symbol of water, fertility and well-being in Aboriginal culture, is known to inhabit Brown Lake and "as a sign of respect to this spirit and to the old ancestors watching over the lake, the Quandamooka women would ask permission before they would enter the lake. Ripples on the water meant permission was denied, while a smooth lake meant women and children were free to enter".

== Environmental threats ==
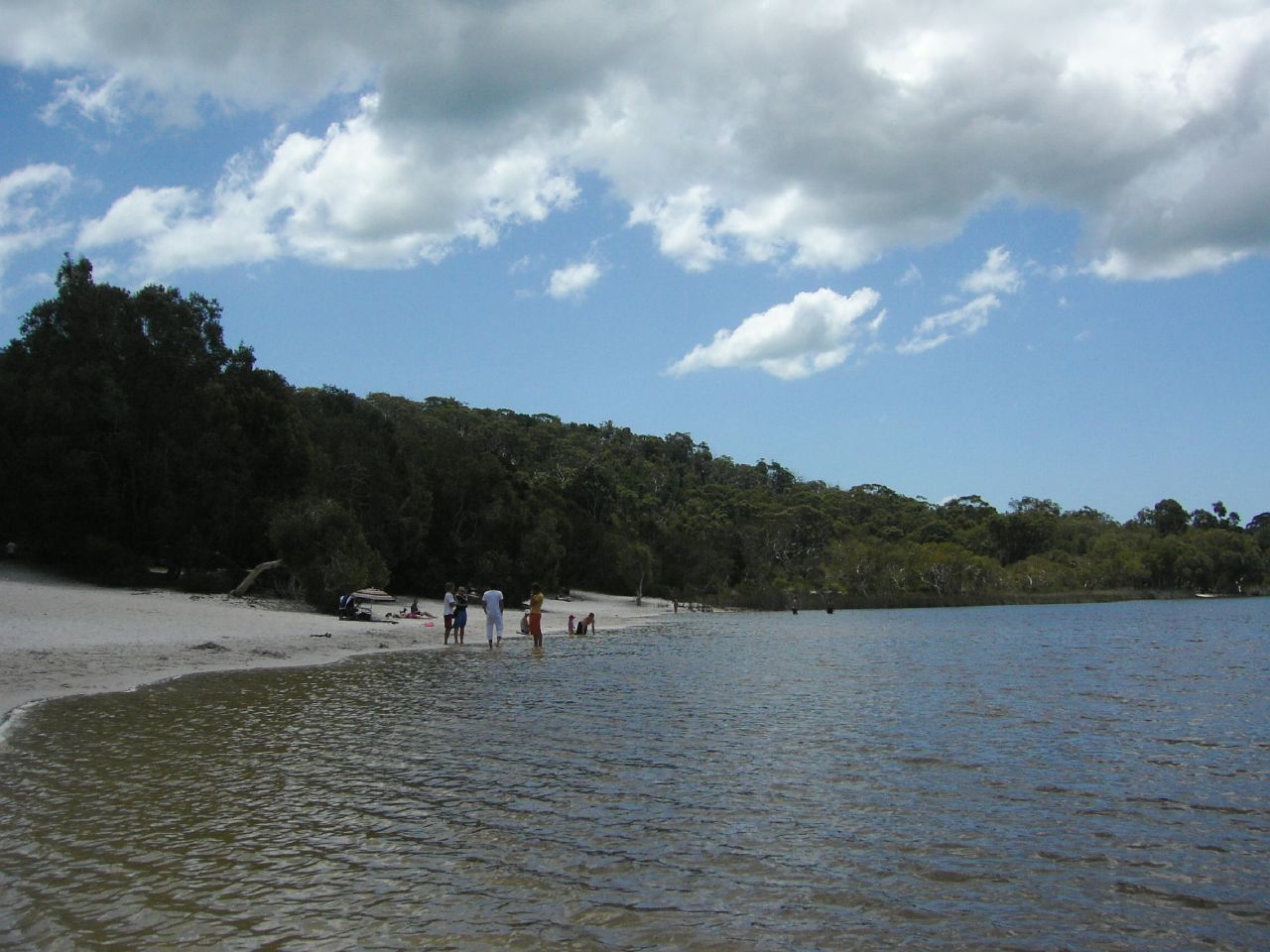
Tourists swimming at Brown Lake

Brown Lake is a popular tourist destination at which a range of recreational activities take place, including picnics, barbecues, camping, boating and swimming. Tourism is threatening Brown Lake's ecosystem, as the high visitation rates cause nutrification (direct nutrient enrichment) through the infiltration of chemicals in urine, soaps, detergents, shampoos, sunscreen and other human product. The increased nutrient supply causes the production of algal blooms, which negatively impact water systems, causing water quality to decline and creating an unbalanced ecosystem; threatening the equilibrium of aquatic habitats.

North Stradbroke Island holds major deposits of valuable minerals such as ilmenite, monazite, zircon and rutile. Consequently, mining is a frequent occurrence in the area encompassing Brown Lake, negatively impacting the environment through habitat degradation, pollution and excessive withdrawal of water, which can potentially lead to loss of lakes due to ruptures at the base of the groundwater aquifer.

Bushfires and fire management practices, such as hazard reduction back burning, threaten Brown Lake’s ecosystem. The fauna and flora of Brown Lake can be heavily impacted through the raised temperatures, habitat destruction and siltation that occurs during fire processes. Also, bushfires often result in an excessive amounts of organic matter, such as ash and leaf littler, entering water systems, which can increase the biological oxygen demand (BOD) of a water body and alter the natural nutrient cycle; impacting flora and fauna.

== Ecosystem management ==
Brown Lake possesses high conservation value; exhibiting cultural and ecological significance. Protected areas, or buffer zones, are extremely effective in maintaining and protecting an ecosystem; conserving and nurturing an areas biodiversity and cultural value for future generations. The Queensland Government and Quandamooka Yoolooburrabee Aboriginal Corporation (GYAC) have included Brown Lake in a protected area expansion strategy that will combine traditional and contemporary management strategies; acknowledging the value of the intimate knowledge Indigenous populations possess of the land and sea. The introduction of traditional management practices is evident through the first planned cultural burn at Brown Lake. In 2020, in order "reduce fuel and aid recovery of culturally significant plant species" an all-women team from the Quandamooka Yoolooburrabee Aboriginal Corporation and Queensland Parks and Wildlife Service engaged in a cultural burn.

== See also ==
- List of lakes in Australia
- North Stradbroke Island
