= Anisocentropus pyraloides =

Scientific classification
- Kingdom: Animalia
- Phylum: Arthropoda
- Clade: Pancrustacea
- Class: Insecta
- Order: Trichoptera
- Family: Calamoceratidae
- Genus: Anisocentropus
- Species: A. pyraloides

Binomial name
- Anisocentropus pyraloides (Walker, 1852)

Synonyms
- Notidobia pyraloides Walker, 1852

Species of caddisfly

Anisocentropus pyraloides is a species of caddisfly in the family Calamoceratidae. It is found in North America.
