= Anisocentropus krampus =

Scientific classification
- Kingdom: Animalia
- Phylum: Arthropoda
- Clade: Pancrustacea
- Class: Insecta
- Order: Trichoptera
- Family: Calamoceratidae
- Genus: Anisocentropus
- Subgenus: Anisocentropus
- Species: A. krampus

Binomial name
- Anisocentropus krampus Malicky, 1994

Species of caddisfly

Anisocentropus krampus is a species of caddisfly in the family Calamoceratidae. It was described in 1994 by Austrian entomologist Hans Malicky and found in New Britain.

== Name ==
Malicky did not specify an etymology. However as other new species described in the same paper, such as Ganonema dracula and Anisocentropus golem, seem to reference monsters from central Europe such as Count Dracula and the golem, the specific epithet likely refers to Krampus.

== Description ==
The distinguishing features of this species are the colorful wings and the male external copulatory organs, especially the laterally protruding lobes of the 10th segment. The designs on the forewing in particular is one of the distinguishing characteristics for this and other related species.

The thorax, head, and appendages are light brown with golden yellow hairs. The antennae also are covered in the same gold hairs. The abdomen is dark brown.

The forewings are also golden yellow with a wide dark brown transverse band in the lower third and irregularly rounded dark brown spot in the distal third. The forewings are broad in shape with a rounded outer margin, 10 mm long in males and 10–11 mm in females.

The hindwings are dark brown and pearlescent.

The ninth segment of the external copulation organs of males are wide with the anterior edge projecting out in the lower third area. On the dorsal side are a pair of long, pointed lobes. The tenth segment bends downwards laterally with two pairs of sharp points. In the dorsoventral view, a pair of lobes extend far outward and only then bent down into points. Yet the caudal pair of spikes is shorter. The pre-anal appendages are long, oval, and erect, and in the cavity of a projecting side lobe of the 9th segment. Laterally the lower appendages are short and triangular, but ventrally they appear long, slender, and directed outwards.

Anisocentropus krampus closely resembles Anisocentropus maclachlani, which differs by having brown-black forewings with a yellow Y-shape. It also resembles Anisocentropus tosavos, but the pattern on the forewings also differs.

== Distribution ==
Anisocentropus krampus is in the Anisocentropus latifasciata diagnostic species group, which has a Gondwanan distribution. The type locality for A. krampus is Kongi (alternatively spelled Komgi) on the Gazelle Peninsula on the island of New Britain in Papua New Guinea at about 1000 m elevation. Four specimens were collected as part of the 1961–1962 Noona Dan Expedition. The holotype and paratypes are kept at the University of Copenhagen Zoological Museum.
