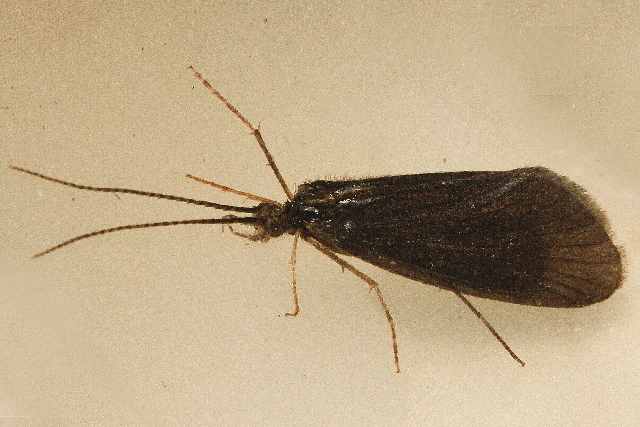

Scientific classification
- Kingdom: Animalia
- Phylum: Arthropoda
- Clade: Pancrustacea
- Class: Insecta
- Order: Trichoptera
- Family: Calamoceratidae
- Genus: Heteroplectron
- Species: H. californicum

Binomial name
- Heteroplectron californicum McLachlan, 1871

= Heteroplectron californicum =

Species of caddisfly

Heteroplectron californicum is a species of caddisfly in the family Calamoceratidae. It is found in North America.
