= Phylloicus aeneus =

Scientific classification
- Kingdom: Animalia
- Phylum: Arthropoda
- Clade: Pancrustacea
- Class: Insecta
- Order: Trichoptera
- Family: Calamoceratidae
- Genus: Phylloicus
- Species: P. aeneus

Binomial name
- Phylloicus aeneus (Hagen, 1861)

Synonyms
- Heteroplectron nigripenne Banks, 1900; Macronema aeneum Hagen, 1861; Phylloicus nigripennis (Banks, 1900)

Species of caddisfly

Phylloicus aeneus is a species of caddisfly in the family Calamoceratidae. It is found in Central America.
