= Georgium (caddisfly) =

Scientific classification
- Kingdom: Animalia
- Phylum: Arthropoda
- Clade: Pancrustacea
- Class: Insecta
- Order: Trichoptera
- Family: Calamoceratidae
- Subfamily: Calamoceratinae
- Genus: Georgium; Fischer, 1964

Genus of caddisflies

Georgium is a genus of caddisflies in the family Calamoceratidae. There are at least two described species in Georgium.

== Species ==
These two species belong to the genus Georgium:

- Georgium japonicum (Ulmer, 1905)
- † Rhabdoceras fusculum (Ulmer, 1912)
