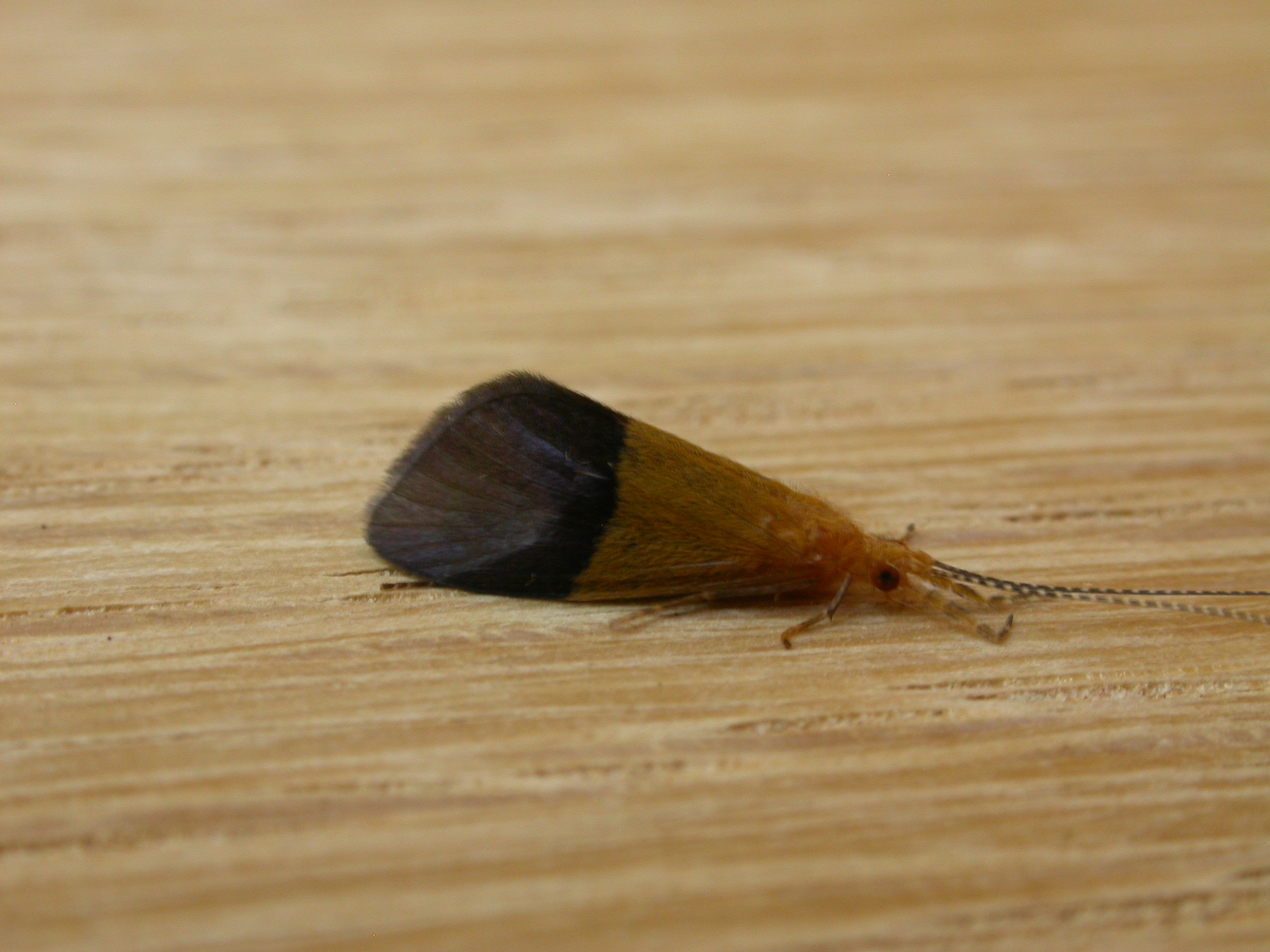
- Anisocentropus bicoloratus

Scientific classification
- Kingdom: Animalia
- Phylum: Arthropoda
- Clade: Pancrustacea
- Class: Insecta
- Order: Trichoptera
- Family: Calamoceratidae
- Subfamily: Anisocentropodinae
- Genus: Anisocentropus; McLachlan, 1863

Subgenera
- Anisocentropus (Anisocentropus) McLachlan, 1863; Anisocentropus (Anisokantropus) Malicky, 1994; Anisocentropus (Anisolintropus) Malicky, 1994; Anisocentropus (Anisomontropus) Malicky, 1994

= Anisocentropus =

Genus of caddisflies

Anisocentropus is a genus of caddisflies in the family Calamoceratidae. There are more than 60 described species in Anisocentropus.

== Species ==
These 62 species belong to the genus Anisocentropus:

- Anisocentropus annulicornis (Hagen, 1858)
- Anisocentropus apis Malicky, 1998
- Anisocentropus bacchus Malicky & Chantaramongkol, 1994
- Anisocentropus banghaasi Ulmer, 1909
- Anisocentropus bellus Banks, 1931
- Anisocentropus bicoloratus (Martynov, 1914)
- Anisocentropus brevipennis (Ulmer, 1906)
- Anisocentropus brunneus Jacquemart, 1967
- Anisocentropus cameloides Malicky, 1995
- Anisocentropus corvinus Neboiss, 1980
- Anisocentropus cretosus McLachlan, 1875
- Anisocentropus croesus McLachlan, 1875
- Anisocentropus diana Malicky & Chantaramongkol, 1994
- Anisocentropus dilucidus McLachlan, 1863
- Anisocentropus eungellus Neboiss, 1980
- Anisocentropus fijianus Banks, 1936
- Anisocentropus fischeri Marlier, 1971
- Anisocentropus flavicaput (McLachlan, 1866)
- Anisocentropus flavomarginatus Ulmer, 1906
- Anisocentropus fulgidus Navás, 1933
- Anisocentropus fulvus Navás, 1934
- Anisocentropus furcatus (Banks, 1924)
- Anisocentropus golem Malicky, 1994
- Anisocentropus handschini Ulmer, 1951
- Anisocentropus hyboma Neboiss, 1986
- Anisocentropus illustris McLachlan, 1863
- Anisocentropus immunis McLachlan, 1863
- Anisocentropus insularis Martynov, 1930
- Anisocentropus io Kimmins, 1962
- Anisocentropus ittikulama Schmid, 1958
- Anisocentropus janus Malicky & Chantaramongkol, 1994
- Anisocentropus kawamurai Iwata, 1927
- Anisocentropus kempi Martynov, 1936
- Anisocentropus kirramus Neboiss, 1980
- Anisocentropus krampus Malicky, 1994
- Anisocentropus latifascia (Walker, 1852)
- Anisocentropus longulus Navás, 1933
- Anisocentropus maclachlani Ulmer, 1929
- Anisocentropus maculatus Ulmer, 1926
- Anisocentropus magnificus Ulmer, 1906
- Anisocentropus magnus (Banks, 1931)
- Anisocentropus minutus (Martynov, 1930)
- Anisocentropus muricatus Neboiss, 1980
- Anisocentropus nitidus Banks, 1937
- Anisocentropus orion Mey, 1997
- Anisocentropus pallidus Martynov, 1935
- Anisocentropus pan Malicky & Chantaramongkol, 1994
- Anisocentropus pandora Malicky & Chantaramongkol, 1994
- Anisocentropus pictilis Neboiss, 1986
- Anisocentropus piepersi McLachlan, 1875
- Anisocentropus pyraloides (Walker, 1852)
- Anisocentropus salsus (Betten, 1909)
- Anisocentropus samuh Olah & Johanson
- Anisocentropus semiflavus Banks, 1939
- Anisocentropus solomonis Banks, 1939
- Anisocentropus torulus Neboiss, 1980
- Anisocentropus triangulatus Ulmer, 1907
- Anisocentropus tristis Ulmer, 1929
- Anisocentropus ulmeri Malicky, 1998
- Anisocentropus usambarensis Ulmer, 1908
- Anisocentropus valgus Neboiss, 1980
- Anisocentropus voeltzkowi Ulmer, 1909
