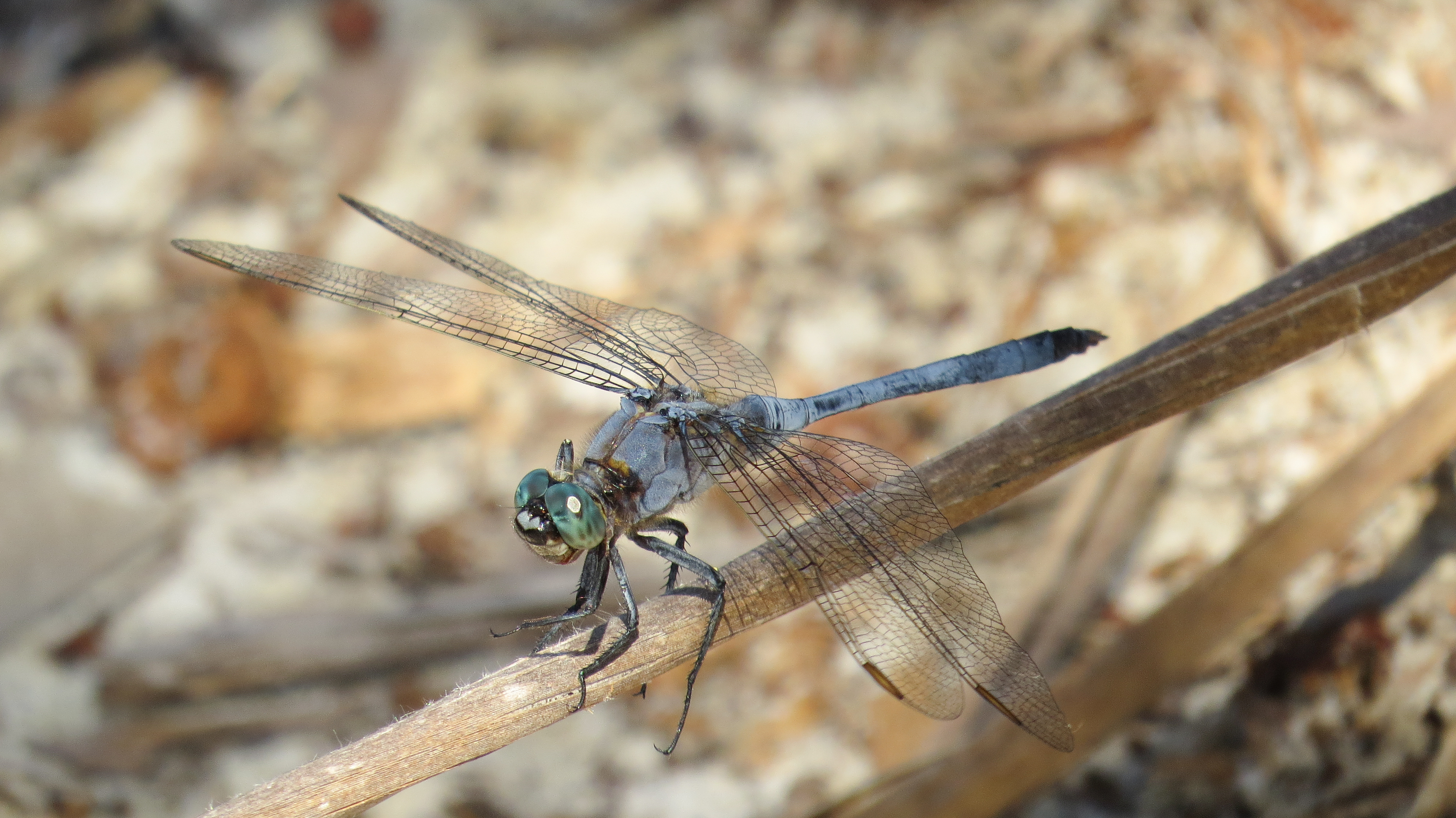
- Male
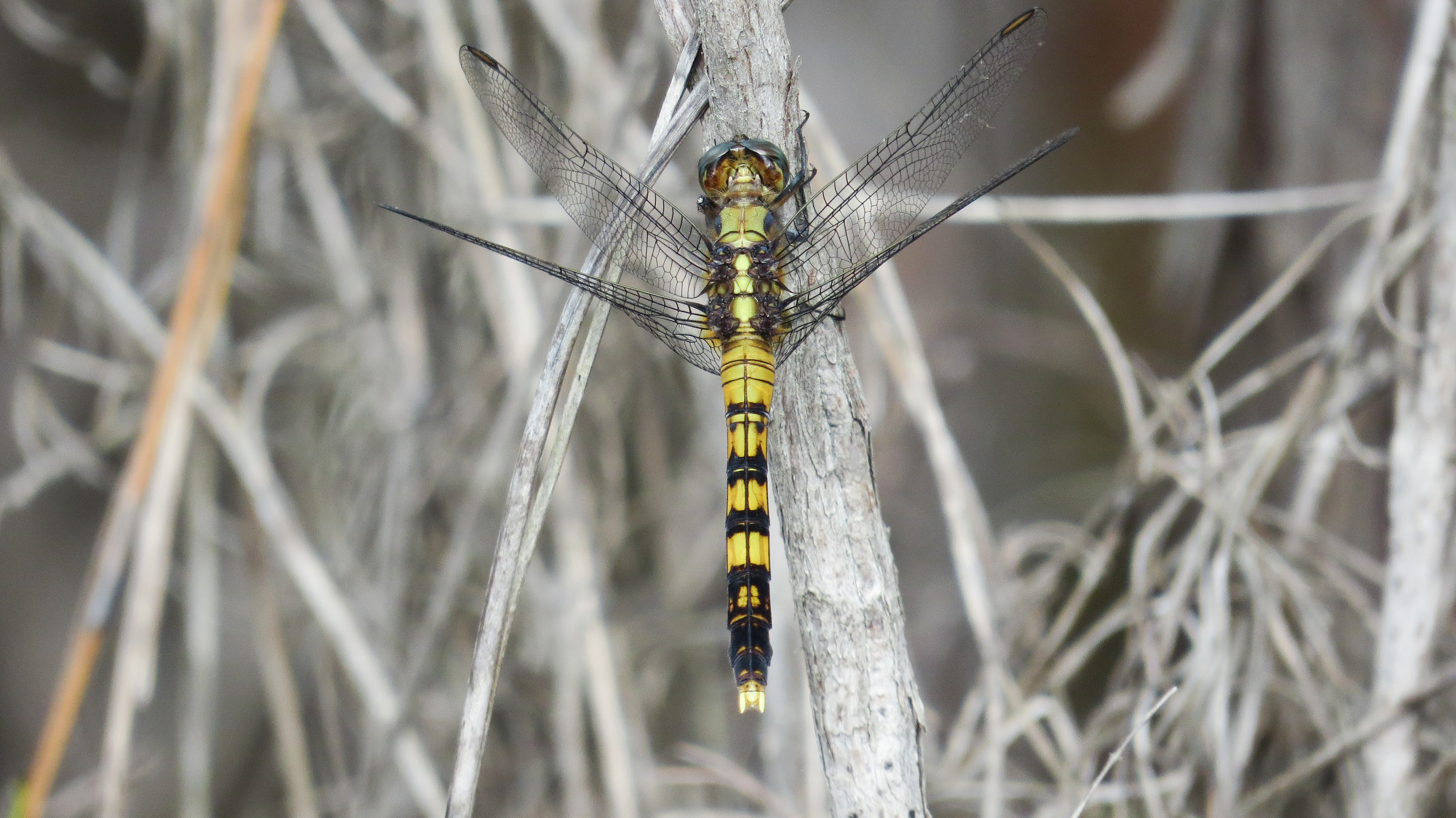
- Female

Conservation status
- Near Threatened (IUCN 3.1)

Scientific classification
- Kingdom: Animalia
- Phylum: Arthropoda
- Clade: Pancrustacea
- Class: Insecta
- Order: Odonata
- Suborder: Anisoptera
- Superfamily: Libelluloidea
- Family: Libellulidae
- Genus: Orthetrum
- Species: O. boumiera

Binomial name
- Orthetrum boumiera Watson & Arthington, 1978

= Orthetrum boumiera =

Brownwater skimmer

Species of dragonfly

Orthetrum boumiera is a freshwater dragonfly species in the family Libellulidae, endemic to eastern Australia, where it inhabits dune lakes. The common name for this species is brownwater skimmer.

Orthetrum boumiera is a medium-sized, yellow dragonfly with black markings. Adult males develop an extensive blue pruinescence, while females will become slightly pruinescent.

== Etymology ==
The genus name Orthetrum is derived from the Greek ὀρθός (orthos, "straight") and ἦτρον (ētron, "abdomen"), referring to the parallel-sided abdomen of the genus.

The species name boumiera is a toponym derived from the Aboriginal name "Bummiera" for Brown Lake on North Stradbroke Island, Queensland, Australia. University of Queensland students first collected specimens of the species in the Bummiera area on North Stradbroke Island.

== Gallery ==
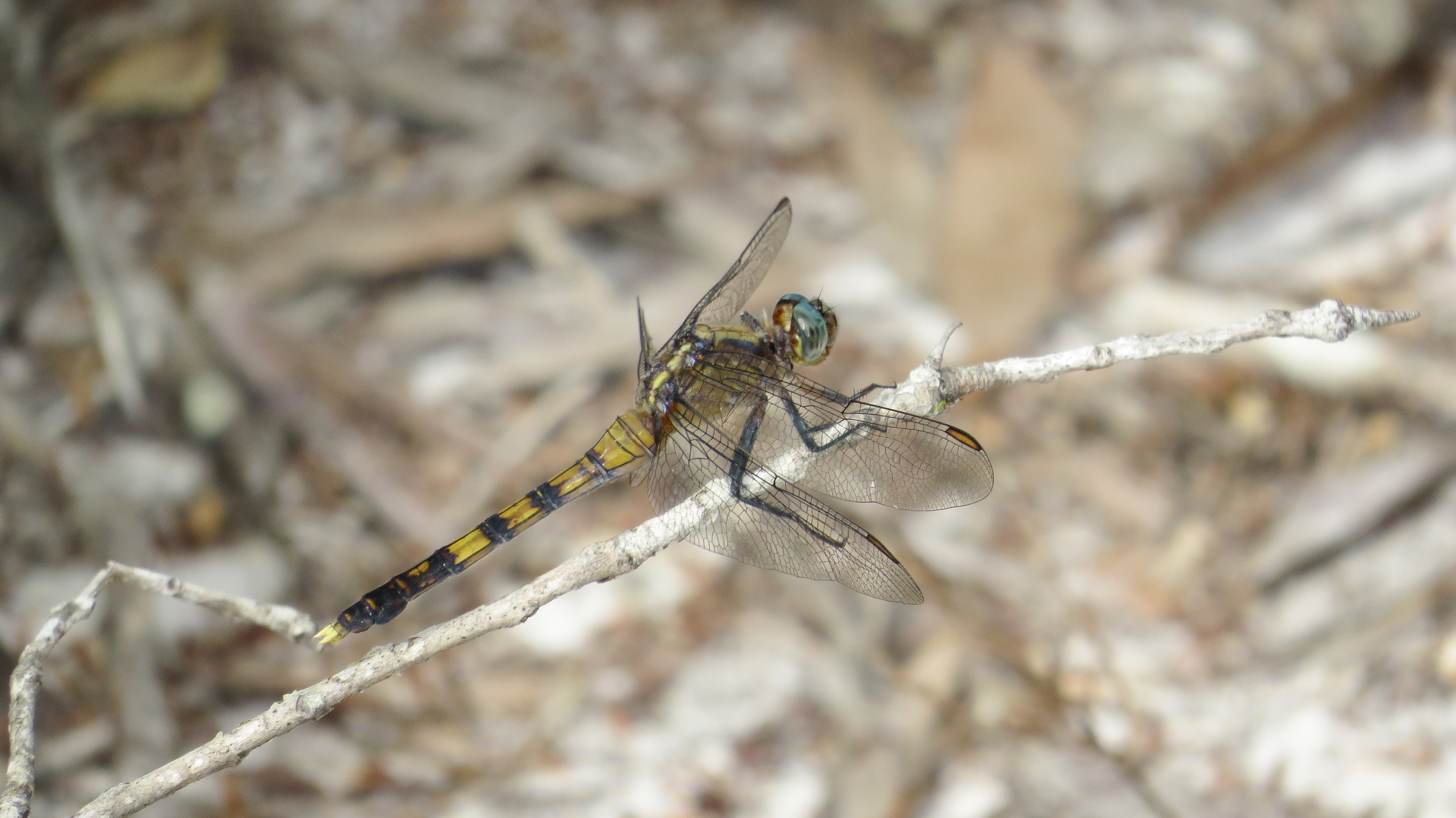
Female profile

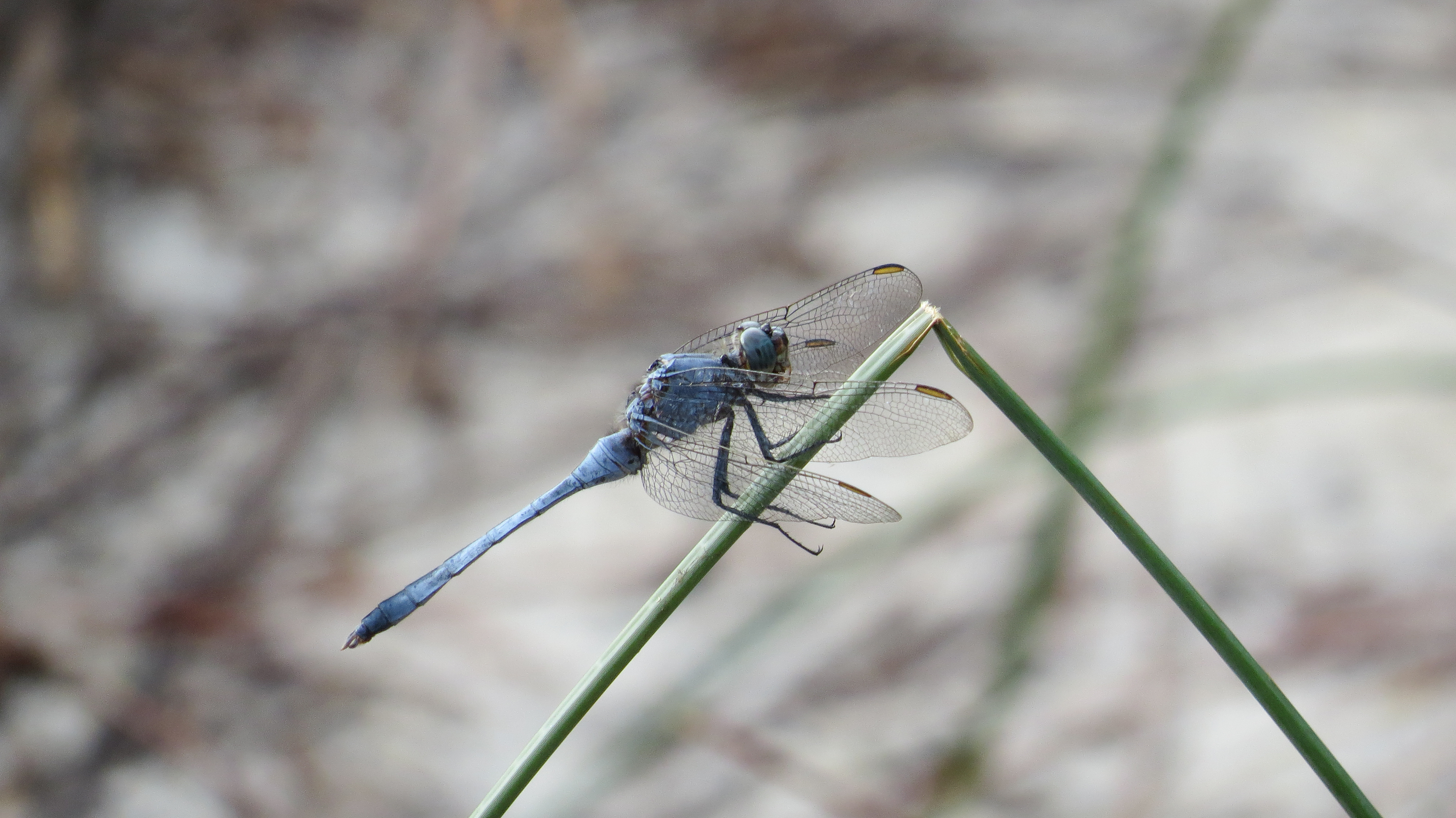
Male profile

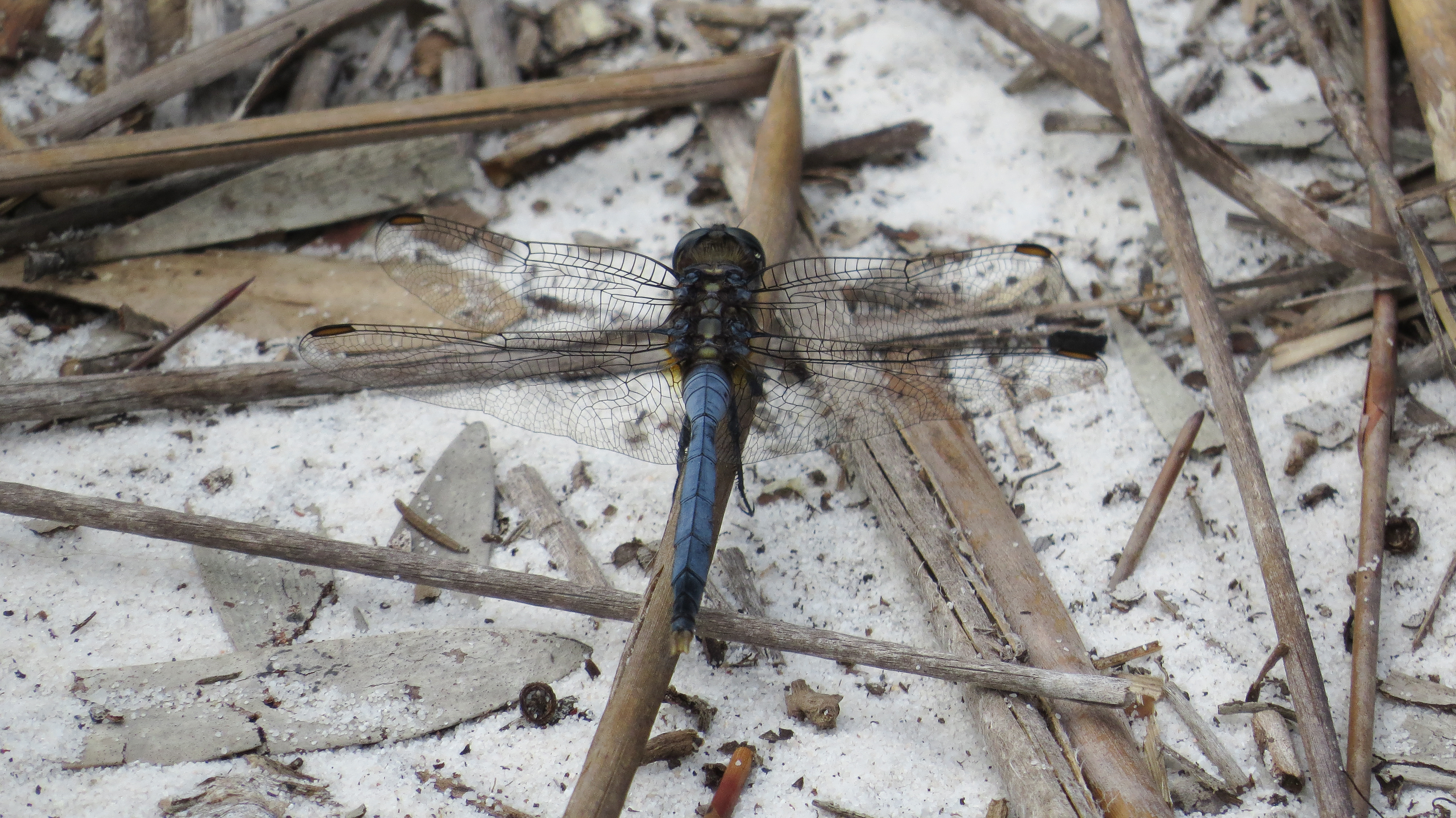
Male view from behind

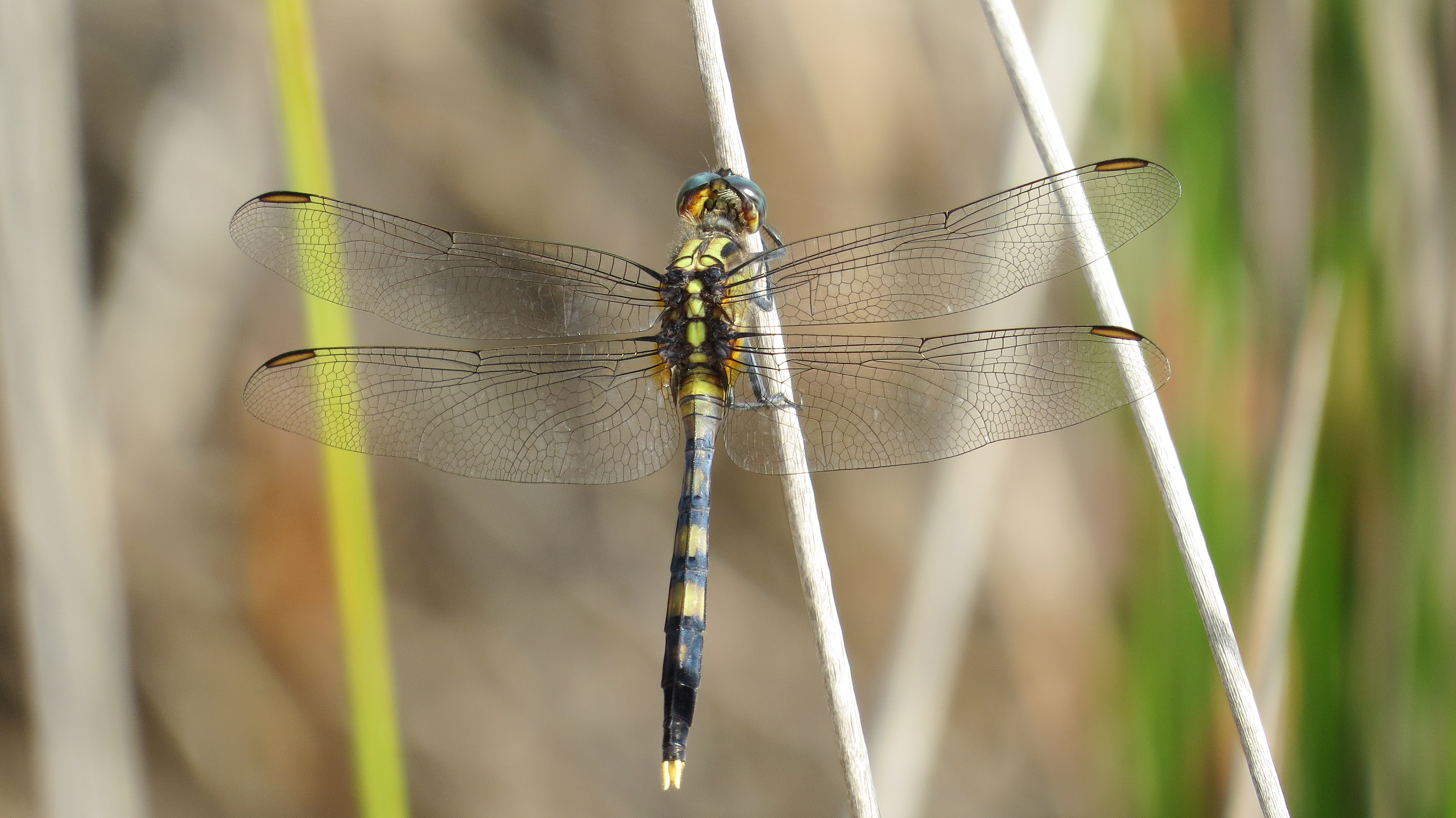
Young male colouring is similar to female

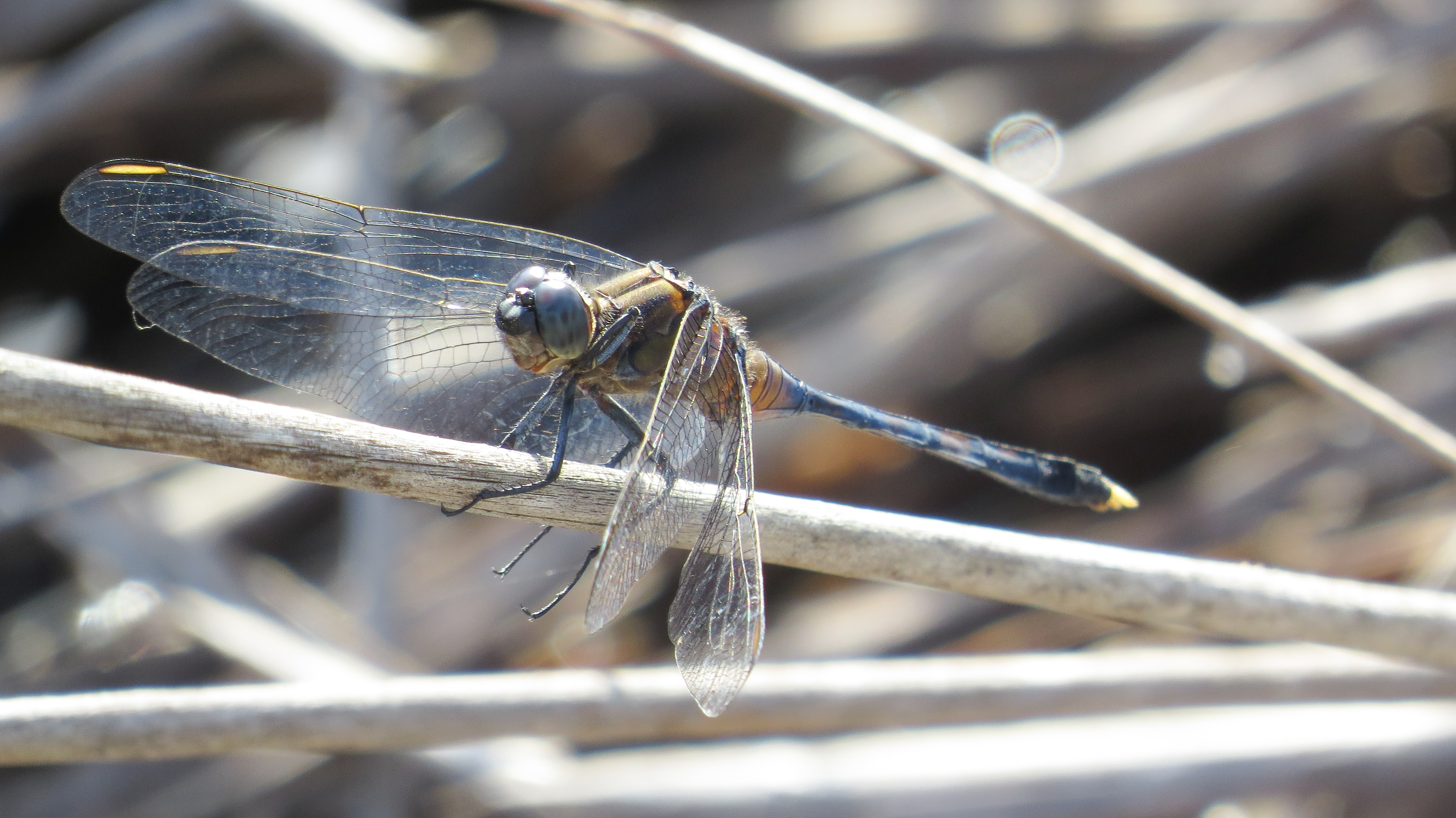
Young male

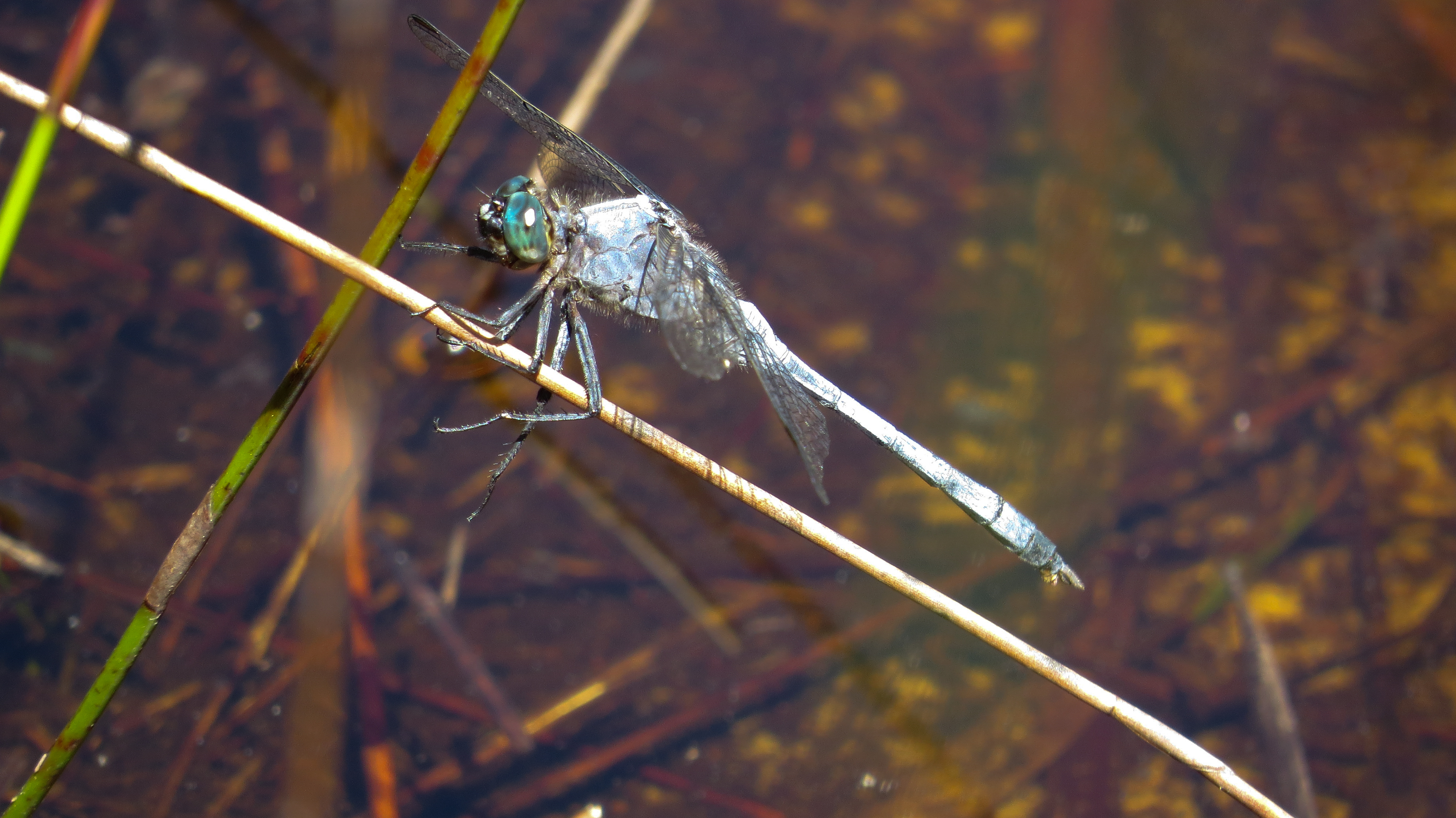
Old male

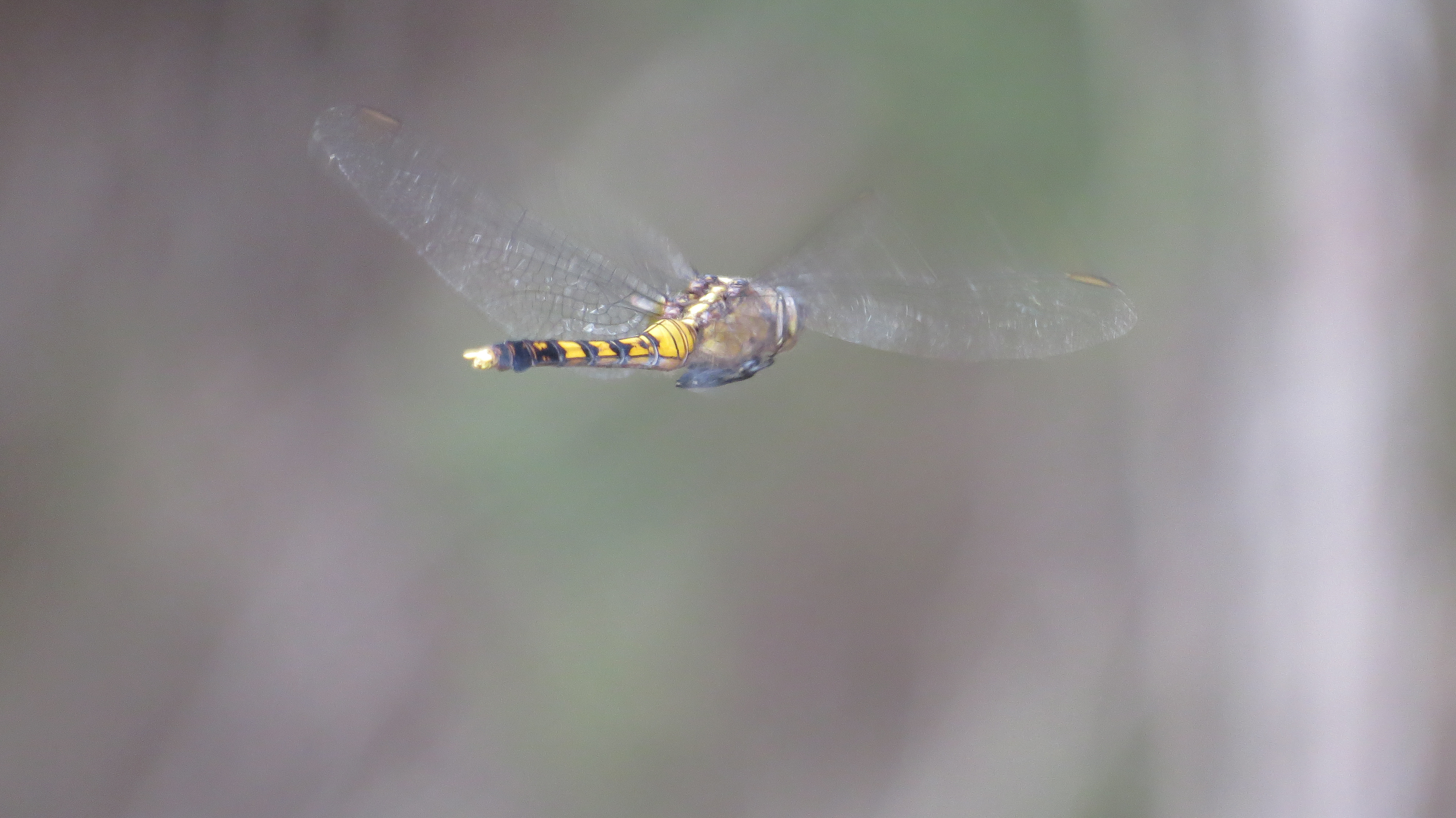
Female flying

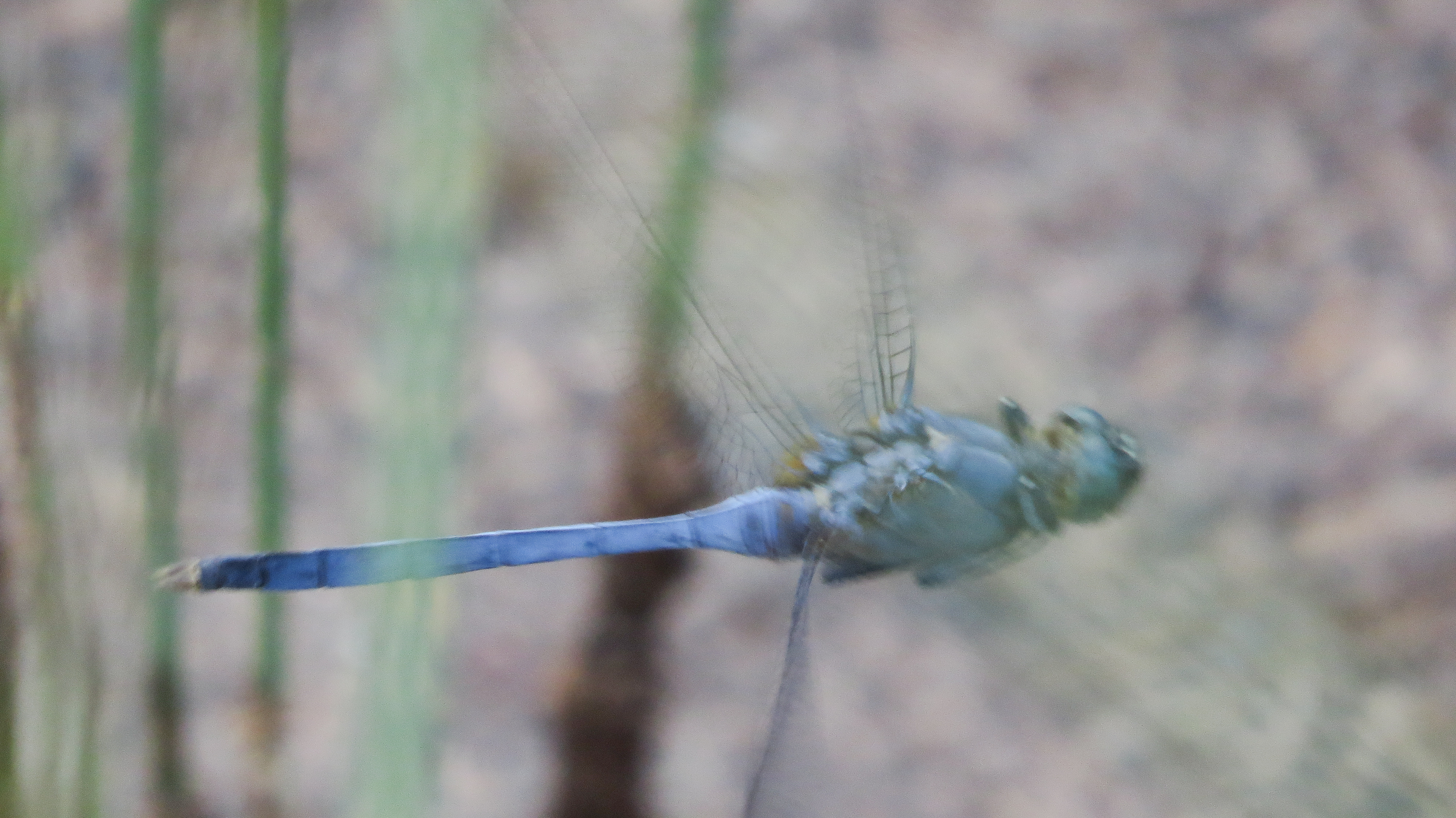
Male flying

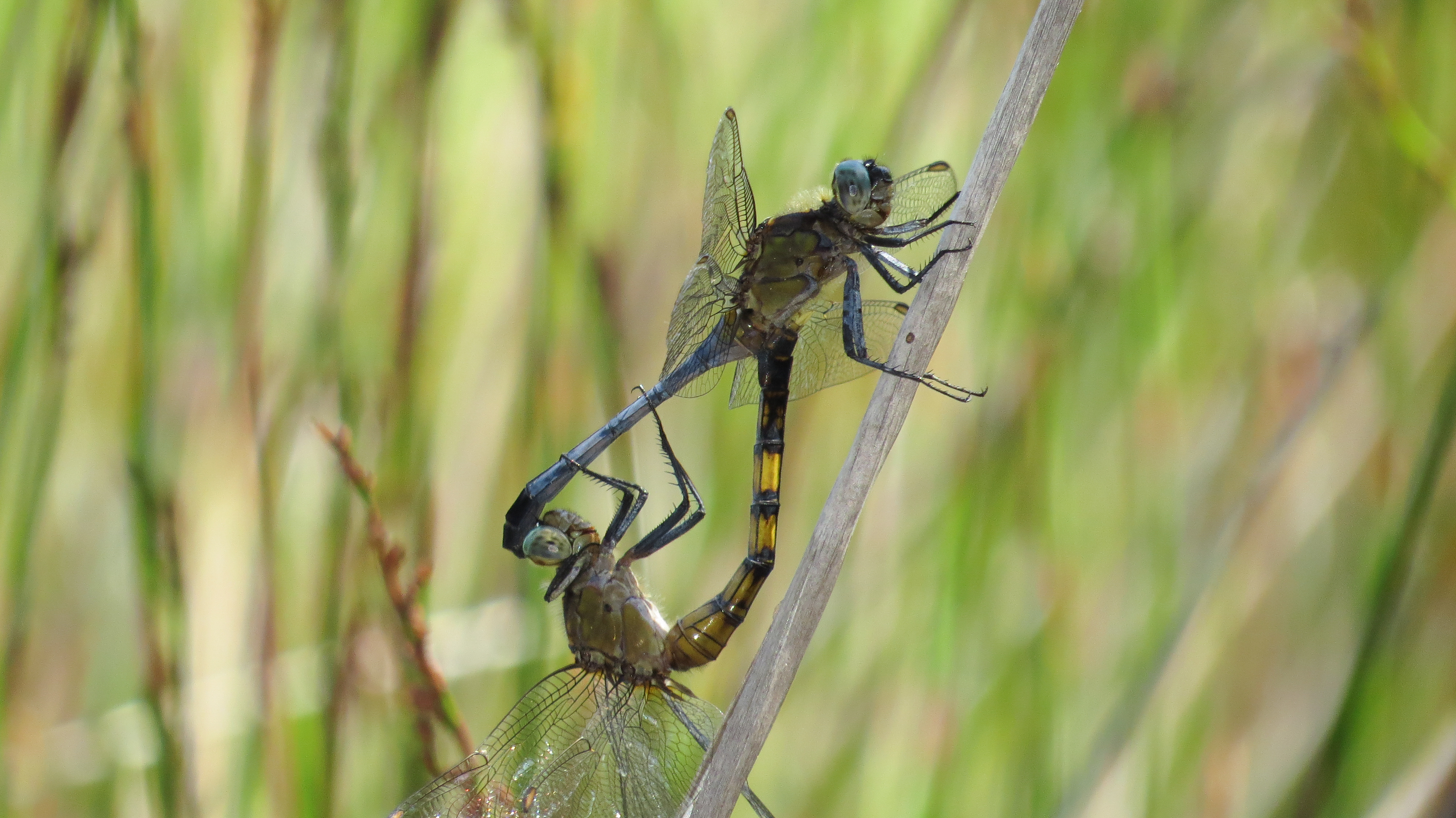
Mating pair, male on top

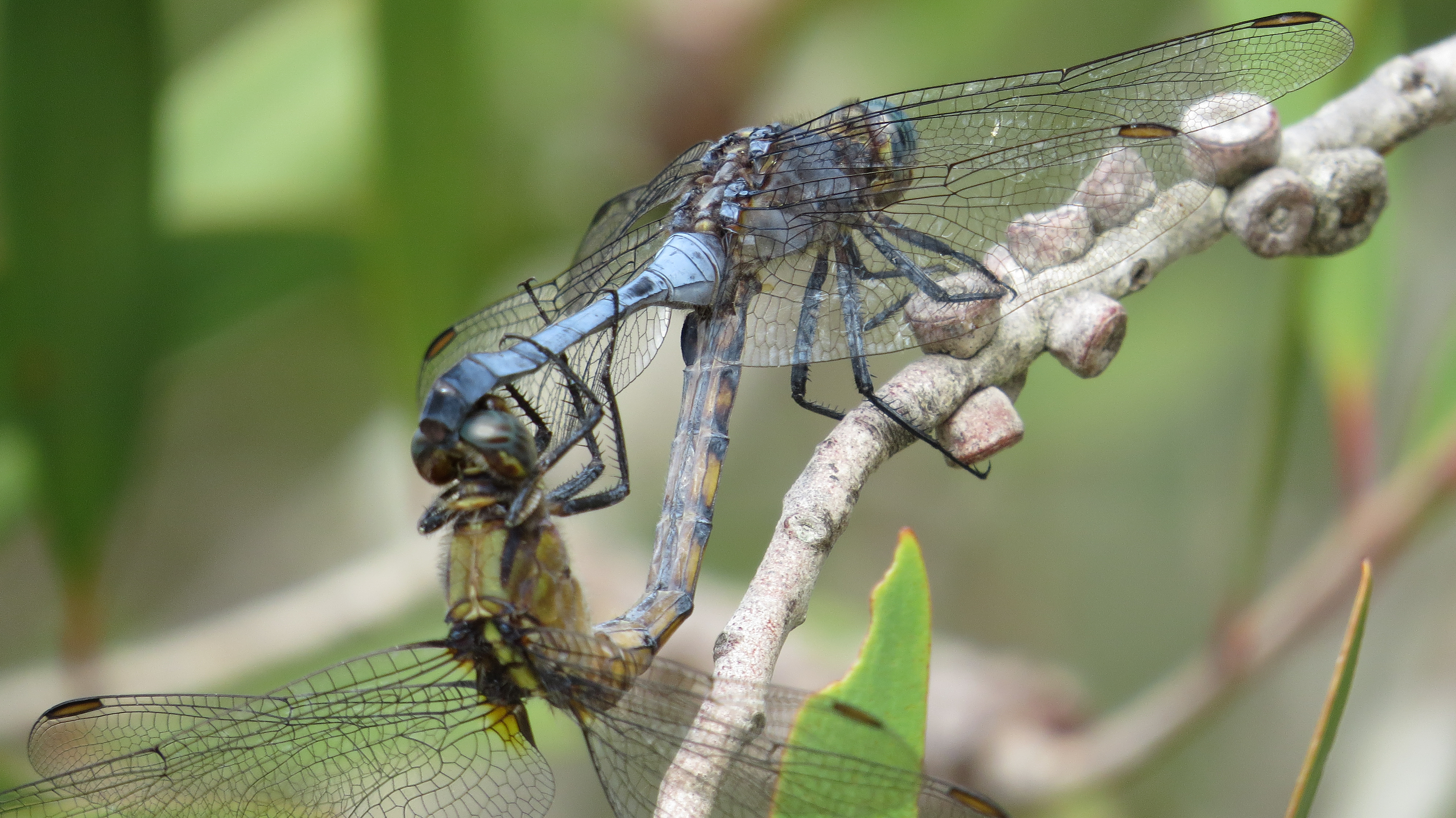
Mating closer

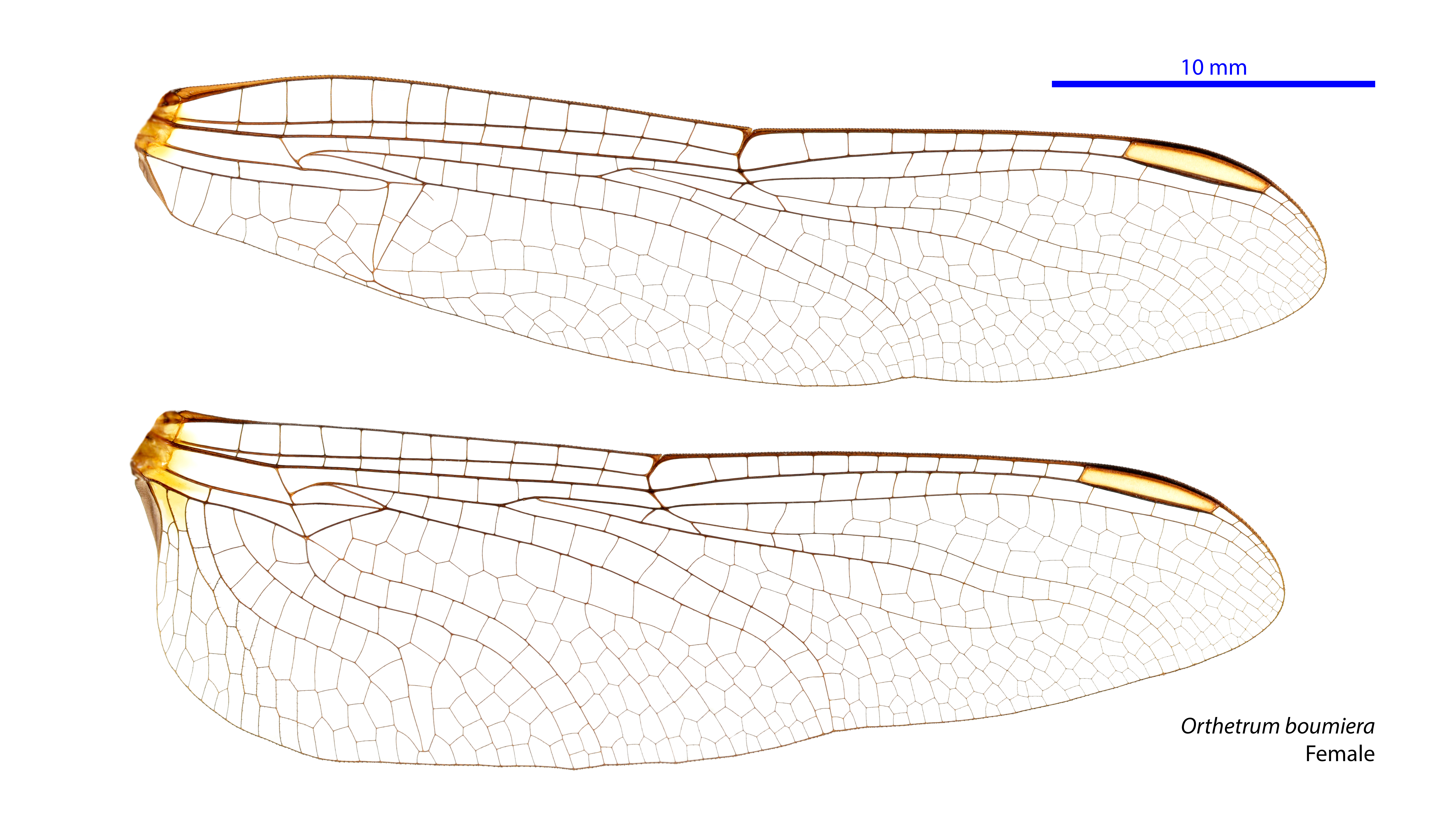
Female wings

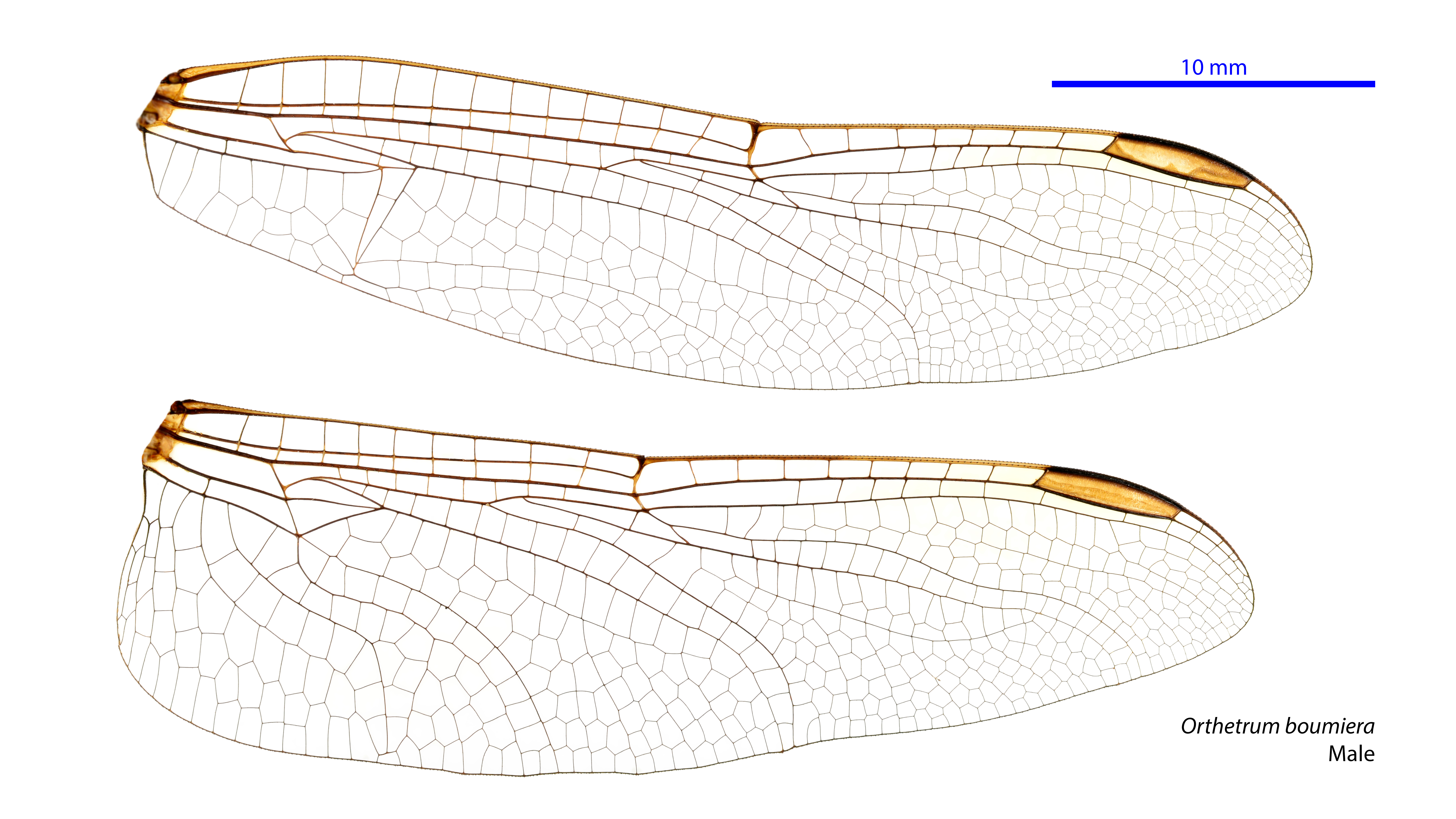
Male wings

== See also ==
- List of Odonata species of Australia
