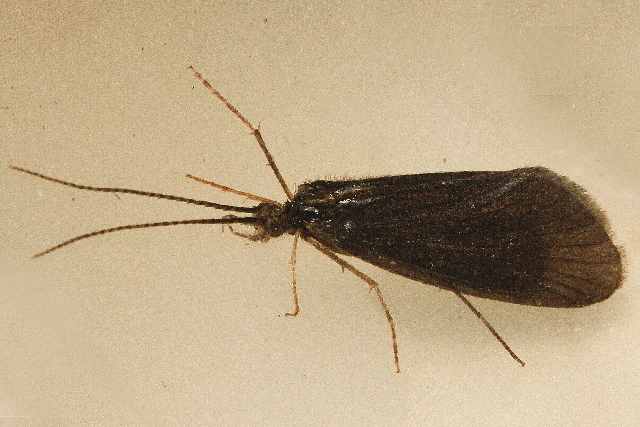
- Heteroplectron californicum

Scientific classification
- Kingdom: Animalia
- Phylum: Arthropoda
- Clade: Pancrustacea
- Class: Insecta
- Order: Trichoptera
- Family: Calamoceratidae
- Genus: Heteroplectron; McLachlan, 1871

= Heteroplectron =

Genus of caddisflies

Heteroplectron is a genus of caddisflies in the family Calamoceratidae. There are at least three described species in Heteroplectron.

== Species ==
These three species belong to the genus Heteroplectron:

- Heteroplectron americanum (Walker, 1852)
- Heteroplectron californicum McLachlan, 1871
- Heteroplectron yamaguchii Tsuda, 1942
