= Phylloicus =

Scientific classification
- Kingdom: Animalia
- Phylum: Arthropoda
- Clade: Pancrustacea
- Class: Insecta
- Order: Trichoptera
- Family: Calamoceratidae
- Genus: Phylloicus; Mueller, 1880

Synonyms
- Murielia Hogue & Denning in Denning, Resh & Hogue, 1983

Genus of caddisflies

Phylloicus is a genus of caddisflies in the family Calamoceratidae. There are more than 40 described species in Phylloicus.

== Species ==
These 43 species belong to the genus Phylloicus:

- Phylloicus abdominalis (Ulmer, 1905)
- Phylloicus aculeatus (Blanchard, 1851)
- Phylloicus aeneus (Hagen, 1861)
- Phylloicus amazonas Prather
- Phylloicus angustior Ulmer, 1905
- Phylloicus brevior Banks, 1915
- Phylloicus bromelianum Mueller, 1880
- Phylloicus camargoi Quinteiro, Calor & Froehlich, 2011
- Phylloicus centralis (Navas, 1924)
- Phylloicus chalybeus (Hagen, 1861)
- Phylloicus cordatus Prather
- Phylloicus crenatus (Navas, 1916)
- Phylloicus cubanus Banks, 1924
- Phylloicus elegans Hogue & Denning in Denning, Resh & Hogue, 1983
- Phylloicus elektoros Prather
- Phylloicus ephippium Prather
- Phylloicus farri Flint, 1968
- Phylloicus fenestratus Flint, 1974
- Phylloicus gomezi Razo-González, 2018
- Phylloicus iridescens Banks, 1941
- Phylloicus lituratus Banks, 1920
- Phylloicus llaviuco Prather
- Phylloicus maculatus (Banks, 1901)
- Phylloicus magnus Banks, 1913
- Phylloicus major Mueller, 1880
- Phylloicus medius Mueller, 1880
- Phylloicus mexicanus (Banks, 1900)
- Phylloicus mirabilis Cavalcante, Dumas & Nessimian, 2018
- Phylloicus monticolus Flint, 1968
- Phylloicus obliquus Navás, 1931
- Phylloicus ornatus (Banks, 1909)
- Phylloicus panamensis Prather
- Phylloicus passulatus Prather
- Phylloicus pirapo Prather
- Phylloicus plaumanni Flint, 1983
- Phylloicus priapulus Denning & Hogue in Denning, Resh & Hogue, 1983
- Phylloicus pulchrus Flint, 1964
- Phylloicus sallesi BarceloS-silva, Desidério & Pes, 2017
- Phylloicus spectabilis Martynov, 1912
- Phylloicus superbus Banks, 1938
- Phylloicus tricalcaratus (Ulmer, 1905)
- Phylloicus trichothylax Prather
- Phylloicus velteni Wichard, 2006
