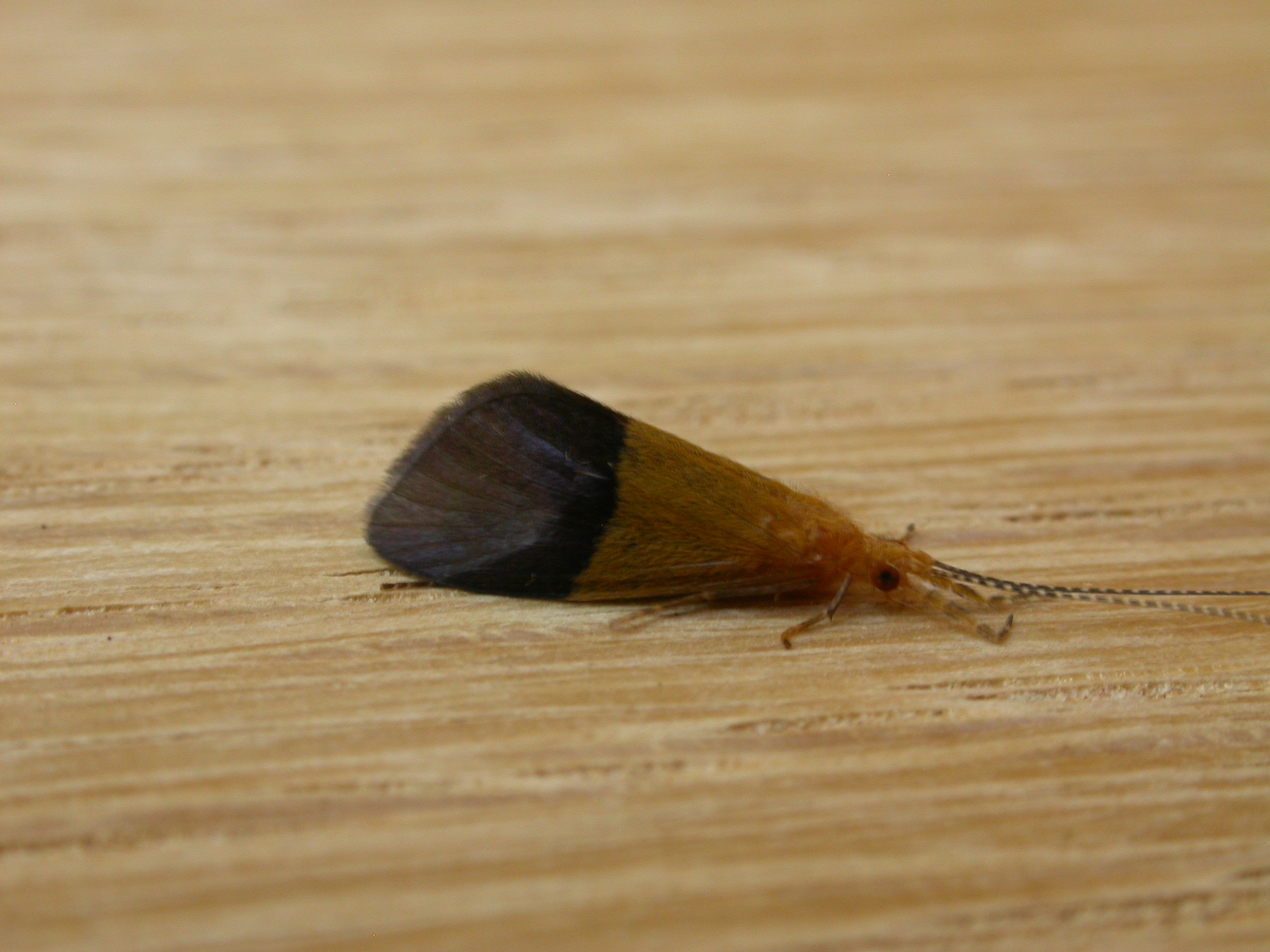
- Anisocentropus bicoloratus

Scientific classification
- Kingdom: Animalia
- Phylum: Arthropoda
- Clade: Pancrustacea
- Class: Insecta
- Order: Trichoptera
- Superfamily: Leptoceroidea
- Family: Calamoceratidae; Ulmer, 1905

= Calamoceratidae =

Family of caddisflies

Calamoceratidae is a family of caddisflies in the order Trichoptera. There are about 9 genera and at least 120 described species in the family Calamoceratidae.

ITIS Taxonomic note:

- Type genus: Calamoceras F Brauer, 1865.

== Genera ==
- Anisocentropus McLachlan, 1863
- Ascalaphomerus Walker, 1852
- Banyallarga Navas, 1916
- Calamoceras Brauer, 1865
- Ganonema McLachlan, 1866
- Georgium Fischer, 1964
- Heteroplectron McLachlan, 1871
- Phylloicus Mueller, 1880
- Silvatares Navás, 1931
