= Erina Heights =

Erina Heights Central Coast, New South Wales
- Coordinates: 33°25′55″S 151°25′05″E
- Population: 421 (2016 census)
- Postcode(s): 2260
- Elevation: 67 m (220 ft)
- Location: 9 km (6 mi) E of Gosford; 85 km (53 mi) NNE of Sydney; 14 km (9 mi) SW of The Entrance
- LGA(s): Central Coast Council
- Parish: Kincumber
- State electorate(s): Terrigal
- Federal division(s): Dobell; Robertson
Suburbs around Erina Heights:
| Holgate | Holgate | Matcham |
| Holgate | Erina Heights | Wamberal |
| Springfield | Erina | Terrigal |

Erina Heights is a suburb of the Central Coast region of New South Wales, Australia between Gosford and the Pacific Ocean at Terrigal. It is part of the Central Coast Council local government area.

It is largely semi-rural, and is home to Central Coast Grammar School and a state primary school, as well as a shopping village consisting of a florist, hairdresser and several other specialty shops.

== Population ==
In the 2016 Census, there were 421 people in Erina Heights. 79.3% of people were born in Australia and 89.8% of people spoke only English at home. The most common responses for religion were No Religion, so described 27.8% and Catholic 25.1%.
