= Mount Elliot, New South Wales =

Coordinates: 33°24′04″S 151°23′17″E

Mount Elliot Central Coast, New South Wales
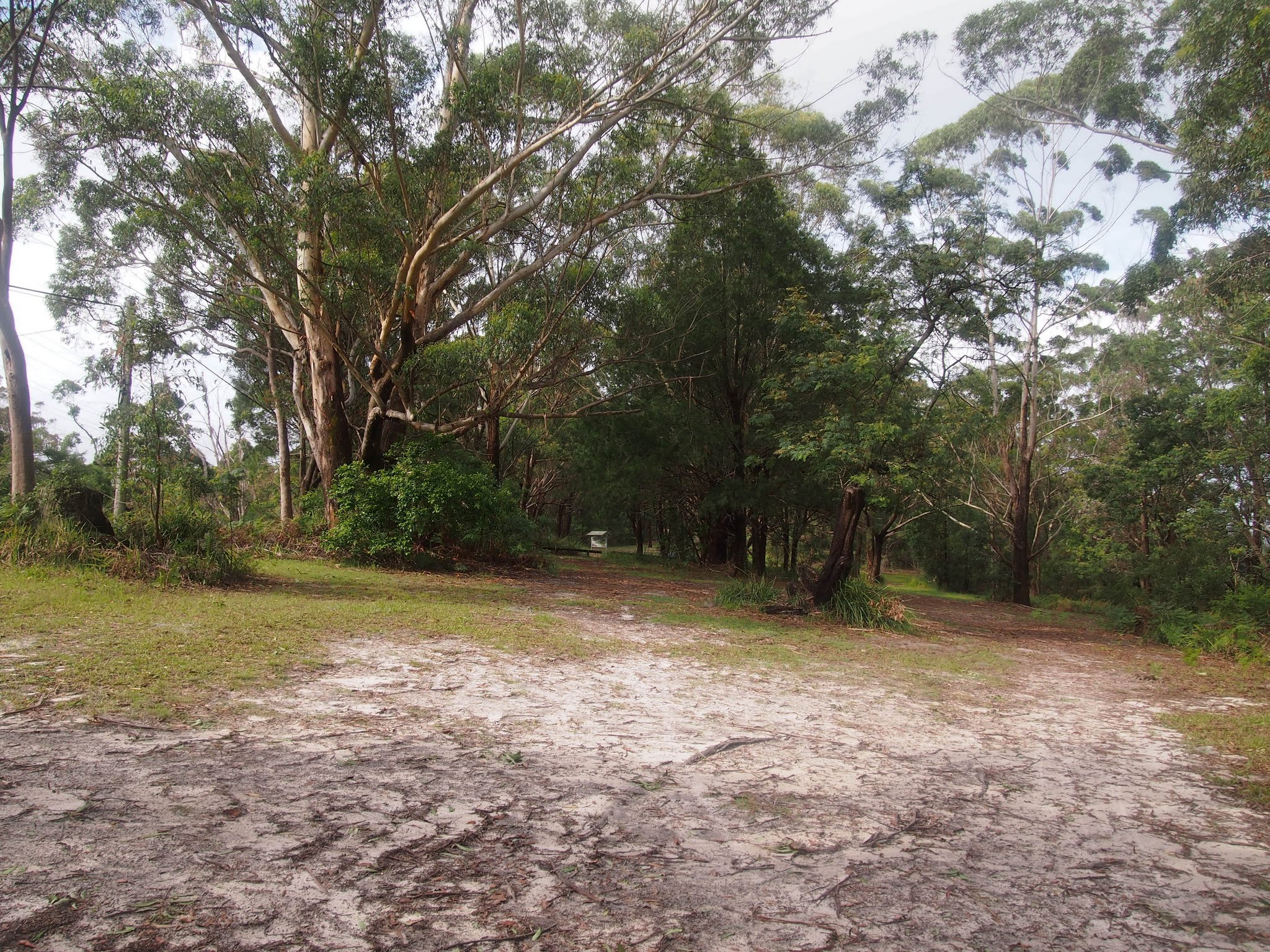
- Population: 169 (SAL 2021)
- Postcode(s): 2250
- Elevation: 204 m (669 ft)
- Location: 9 km (6 mi) ENE of Gosford; 18 km (11 mi) WSW of The Entrance
- LGA(s): Central Coast Council
- Parish: Gosford
- State electorate(s): The Entrance
- Federal division(s): Dobell
Suburbs around Mount Elliot:
Lisarow	Lisarow	Lisarow
Wyoming	Mount Elliot	Holgate
North Gosford	Springfield	Holgate

Mount Elliot is a semi-rural locality of the Central Coast region of New South Wales, Australia, 9 kilometres (6 mi) east-north-east of Gosford's central business district. It is part of the Central Coast Council local government area.
