= Sing for Your Supper =

Sing for Your Supper may refer to:

== Drama, television, and film ==
- Sing for Your Supper (film), a 1941 American musical comedy film directed by Charles Barton
- Sing for Your Supper (musical), a 1939 Broadway musical revue
- Sing for Your Supper, a 2000 revue of the works of Rodgers and Hart by the Wyong Musical Theatre Company
- "Sing for Your Supper", a 1958 episode of The Real McCoys
- "Sing for Your Supper", a 2021 episode of The Real Housewives of Potomac
- "Sing for Your Supper", a episode of the television series Surprise! It's Edible Incredible!
- "Sing for Your Supper", a 2022 episode of Best & Bester

== Literature ==
- Sing for Your Supper, a 1941 book by Lenora Mattingly Weber
- Sing for Your Supper, a 1963 book by Pamela Frankau
- Sing for Your Supper, a 2007 book by Rosie Harris
- Sing for Your Supper: The Broadway Musical in the 1930s, a 2005 book by Ethan Mordden

== Music ==
- "Sing for Your Supper" (Rodgers and Hart), a 1938 popular song by composer Richard Rodgers and lyricist Lorenz Hart originally from the musical The Boys from Syracuse
- "Sing for Your Supper", a song by Cathy Davey on her 2007 album Tales of Silversleeve
- "Sing for Your Supper", a song by The Snuts on their 2021 album W.L.
- "Sing for Your Supper", a 2017 single by The Last Gang
