= Point Frederick =

Point Frederick may refer to:

- Point Frederick, New South Wales
- Point Frederick (Kingston, Ontario), a peninsula in Kingston, Ontario
