= Central Coast Adventist School =

Location
- Erina, Central Coast, New South Wales; Australia; 33°26′08″S 151°23′22″E

Information
- Type: Independent co-educational early learning, primary and secondary day school
- Motto: Latin: Nihil Sine Deo (Nothing Without God)
- Religious affiliation: Australian Union Conference of Seventh-day Adventists
- Denomination: Seventh-day Adventist
- Established: 1969; 57 years ago
- Founder: John Hammond
- Principal: Tony Kent
- Employees: c. 120
- Years: Early learning and K–12
- Enrolment: c. 920 (2014)
- Colours: Silver, blue, and white
- Website: www.ccas.nsw.edu.au

Central Coast Adventist School is an independent Seventh-day Adventist co-educational early learning, primary and secondary day school, located in Erina, on the Central Coast of New South Wales, Australia.

Founded in 1969, the school is a part of the Seventh-day Adventist education system, the world's second largest Christian school system. John Hammond was the first principal with 18 students. The school has grown to over 900 students today.

== History ==
The school was established on former farm land which was donated to the local church for the establishment of the school. Local church member, Kevin Chugg, built two classrooms at a total cost of $16,000.

== Gallery ==
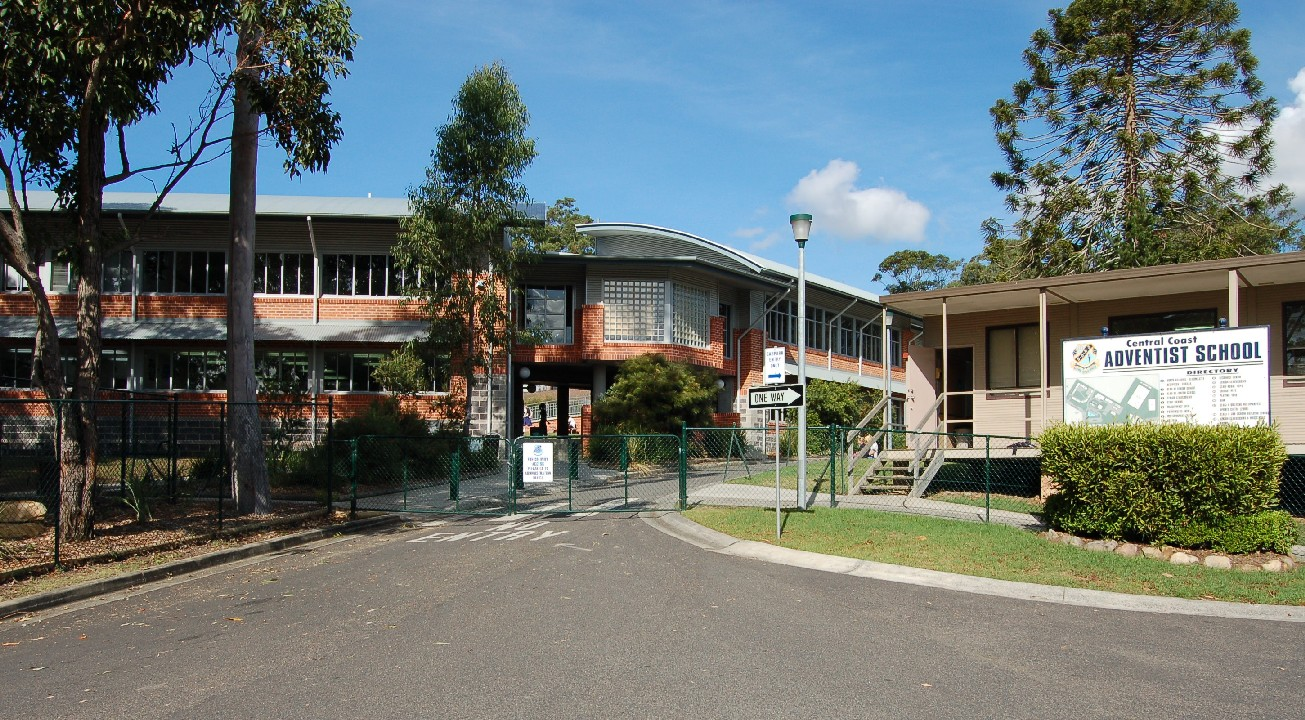
Main high school building as viewed from front entrance.

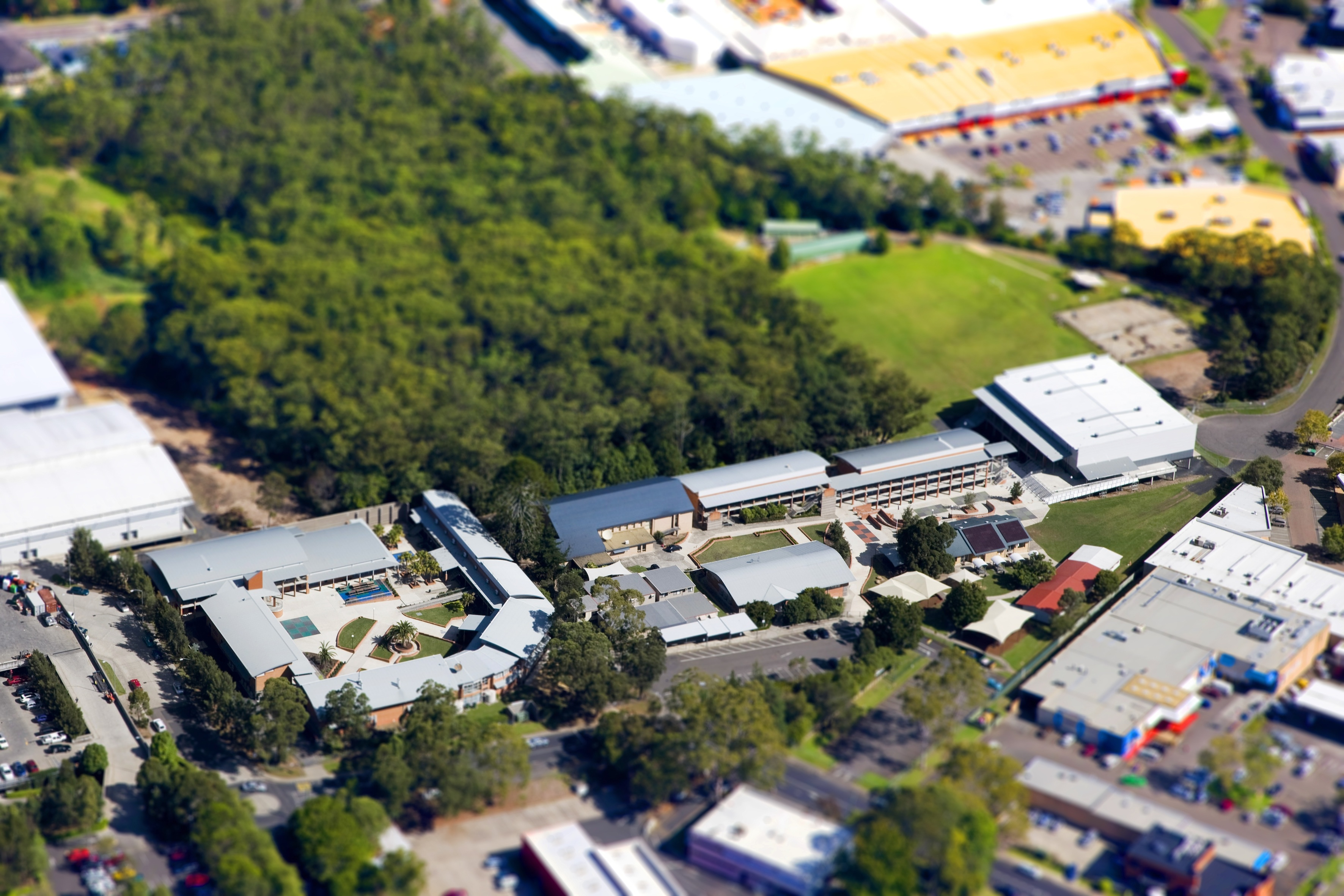
Aerial image of the Central Coast Adventist School campus in 2011.

== See also ==
- List of Seventh-day Adventist secondary schools
- List of non-government schools in New South Wales
