= Central Coast Grammar School =

Location
- Erina Heights, Central Coast, New South Wales; Australia; 33°25′30″S 151°23′53″E

Information
- Type: Independent secular co-educational primary and secondary day school
- Motto: Latin: Vita Et Scientia (Life and Knowledge)
- Established: 1985; 41 years ago
- Educational authority: New South Wales Department of Education
- Chairman: Stephen Brahams
- Headmaster: Phillip O'Regan
- Employees: 213
- Grades: K–12
- Enrolment: 1315 (2020)
- Area: 17 hectares (42 acres)
- Campus type: Suburban
- Colours: Green, gold & blue
- Publication: Bundara (magazine)
- Website: www.ccgs.nsw.edu.au

Central Coast Grammar School is an independent secular co-educational primary and secondary day school, located in Erina Heights on the Central Coast of New South Wales, Australia. The school provides a general education for approximately 1,315 students from Year K to Year 12; and is situated on a 17-hectare (42-acre) campus with many buildings such as the Richard Lornie Centre, named after the former headmaster, the Junior School buildings for Kindergarten to Year 6, tennis and basketball courts, a rugby oval used for many purposes and a hockey turf.

== History ==
The school was established in 1985, opening with 16 teachers and 185 students. It was the first school of its type on the Central Coast. It was expanded in the 1990s, incorporating buildings from the former Erina Hotel-Motel.

== Headmasters ==
The following individuals have served as headmasters of Central Coast Grammar School:

Ordinal	Officeholder	Term start	Term end	Time in office	Notes
1	Ron Chambers	1985	1987	1–2 years	
2	Richard Lornie OAM	1988	2008	19–20 years	
3	William Low	2009	2023	16–17 years	
4	Phillip O'Regan	2024	incumbent	0 years	

== Houses ==
The six school houses are named after native Australian flora:

- Acacia (yellow)
- Banksia (orange)
- Grevillea (red)
- Ironbark (blue)
- Nicholii (green)
- Hakea (purple)

== Notable alumni ==
- Charlotte Best – actress and model
- Caitlin De Wit – Australian wheelchair basketball player
- Matt Graham – Olympic skier
- Gordon Reid – Politician
- Charlie Hunter – Olympic Runner
- Sam Corlett – actor

== See also ==
- List of non-government schools in New South Wales
