= Caitlin De Wit =

Australian wheelchair basketball player

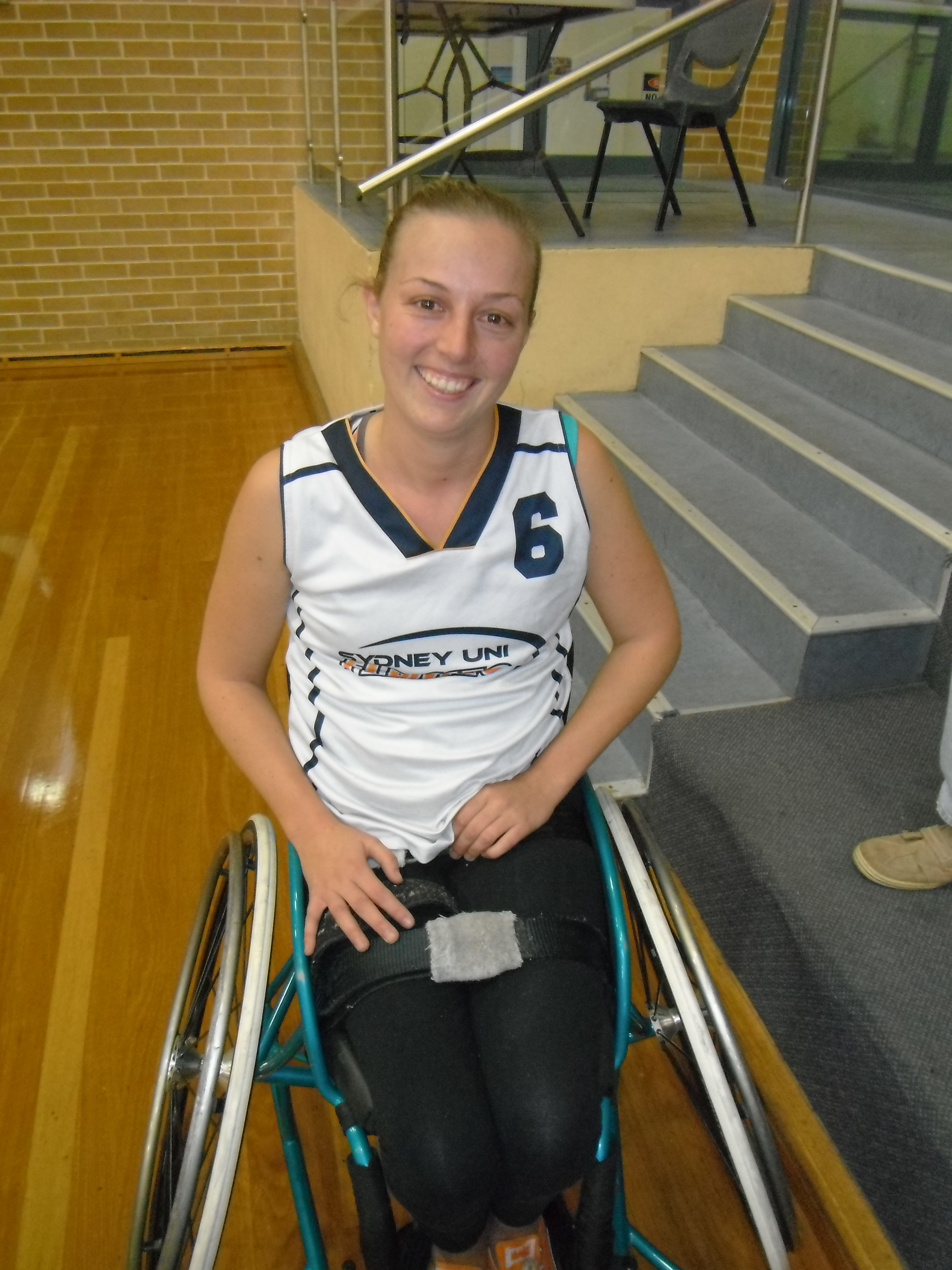
- Caitlin De Wit at a Sydney University Flames game in June 2013

Personal information
- Nationality: Australia
- Born: 19 June 1987 (age 39)

Sport
- Sport: Wheelchair basketball
- Disability class: 3.0
- Event: Women's team
- Club: Sydney University Flames

Caitlin De Wit (born 19 June 1987) is a 3.0 point Australian wheelchair basketball player. She was part of the Australia women's national wheelchair basketball team at the Osaka Cup in Japan in February 2013, and the Asia-Oceania Zone Qualifiers in Bangkok in November 2013. She played with the Hills Hornets team that won the Women's National Wheelchair basketball League (WNWBL) championship title in 2007, 2008 and 2009, and the Sydney University Flames team that won it in 2010.

== Personal ==
Caitlin De Wit was born on 19 June 1987, and grew up on the Central Coast of New South Wales. She attended Central Coast Grammar School, and then Charles Sturt University, where she studied for a Bachelor of Applied Science degree in Equine Studies. During her first year at Charles Sturt, she broke her L4-L6 lumbar vertebrae in a horse riding accident. She was airlifted to Royal North Shore Hospital, where she was diagnosed as an incomplete paraplegic. She returned to Charles Sturt to complete her degree, assisted by a 2006 ParaQuad scholarship, and graduated in 2007. In 2010, she began studying for a Bachelor of Veterinary Science degree at Sydney University, where she received a Sydney University Sports and Fitness Elite Athlete Program scholarship.

== Wheelchair basketball ==
=== Club ===
De Wit is classified as a 3.0 point player. She began playing wheelchair basketball in 2007. She joined with the Sydney-based Hills Hornets, who won the Women's National Wheelchair Basketball League (WNWBL) title in 2007, 2008 and 2009. Renamed the Sydney University Flames team in 2010, the team were league champions again that year.

=== National ===
De Wit made her international debut playing for the Under 25 team in the Under 25 Women's Wheelchair Basketball World Championships in Canada in 2011, winning a silver medal. In 2012, she trained with Porto Torres, an Italian team. She made her debut with the senior team, known as the Gliders, at the Osaka Cup in Japan in February 2013, where the Gliders successfully defended the trophy they had won in 2008, 2009, 2010 and 2012. In October 2013, she was selected to play at the International Wheelchair Basketball Federation (IWBF) Asia/Oceania Championships in Thailand in November 2013.

Season statistics
Competition	Season	Matches	FGM-FGA	FG%	3FGM-3FGA	3FG%	FTM-FTA	FT%	PF	Pts	TOT	AST	PTS
WNWBL	2013	13	28–96	29.2	—	0.0	9–27	33.3	37	65	4.9	1.6	5.0
WNWBL	2012	14	13–48	27.1	—	0.0	2–5	40.0	26	38	3.1	0.6	2.0
WNWBL	2011	19	39–116	33.6	—	0.0	11–43	25.6	51	89	5.0	1.1	4.7
WNWBL	2010	15	2–17	11.8	—	0.0	—	0.0	12	4	1.7	0.3	0.3
WNWBL	2009	11	5–26	19.2	—	0.0	3–9	33.3	15	13	1.8	0.4	1.2

Key
FGM, FGA, FG%: field goals made, attempted and percentage	3FGM, 3FGA, 3FG%: three-point field goals made, attempted and percentage
FTM, FTA, FT%: free throws made, attempted and percentage	PF: personal fouls
Pts, PTS: points, average per game	TOT: turnovers average per game, AST: assists average per game
