= Erina Fair =

- Location: Erina, New South Wales, Australia
- Coordinates: 33°26′14″S 151°23′33″E
- Address: Terrigal Drive
- Opened: 24 August 1987
- Developer: Grace Bros
- Manager: Lendlease
- Owner: Lendlease (50%); National Pension Service (50%)
- Num. of stores: 258
- Num. of anchor tenants: 9
- Floor area: 113,643 m^{2} (1,223,243 sq ft)
- Floors: 3
- Parking: 4,528 spaces
- Website: www.erinafair.com.au

Erina Fair is a large shopping centre in the suburb of Erina on the Central Coast of New South Wales, Australia. It was the largest single level shopping centre in the Southern Hemisphere and the largest shopping centre on the Central Coast and in regional Australia.

== History ==
Central Coast Fair opened on 24 August 1987 and is the largest single level shopping centre in the Southern Hemisphere. It was developed by Grace Bros who already owned a 12-hectare (30-acre) site off Karalta Road. They also purchased additional land in the old drive-in site which was used for carparks and large stores.

Central Coast Fair featured a single level Grace Bros, Big W, Target, Franklins, Woolworths and 95 specialty stores. The floor space of the centre was roughly equivalent to six football fields.

51,000 shoppers attend the opening and took advantage of opening specials. A sale at Best & Less of 1 cent pantyhose saw stock exhausted in 30 minutes and Angus & Coote jewellers sold 10 $400 rings for $10 each within minutes. A second stage of redevelopment was on the drawing board at the time of opening.

In 1994 Erina Fair underwent an $85 million stage two development. This development expanded the size of the centre by at least 10% and included a naturally lit boardwalk, a new eatery and carpark extensions.

The bulky-goods retail precinct was added in 1995 with the opening of JB Hi-Fi, The Good Guys and Toys "R" Us. Intencity arcade and the Hoyts cinema complex opened in 1996 near the site of the old drive-in which was running between 1958 and 1985.

Erina Fair underwent the stage three $200 million, two year development in 2003. This resulted in the addition of "The Corner" precinct with new Coles supermarket and Harris Farm Markets, Kmart, Cotton On, JB Hi-Fi, Rebel Sport, new specialty stores, a new Central Coast-history themed food court known as "The Atrium", a new specialty mall, restaurant precinct, health and fitness club. It also included the opening of The Hive which features a library, community hall and youth recreation centre. Franklins closed in 2005 and was replaced by Aldi.

Erina Ice Arena is an Olympic-sized indoor ice skating rink which opened in 2003 as part of the development. It serves as the home ice rink of the Central Coast Rhinos. The ice rink features a 60m x 30m ice sheet and a large grandstand for spectators at major events and ice hockey games. There are many function and party rooms. The rink is also home to the Central Coast Figure Skating Club and the Central Coast Ice Speed Skating Club.

It closed on 19 August 2019 for renovations and removal of a dangerous external cladding. It was reopened with a ribbon-cutting ceremony on 2 January 2021.

In 2013, the GPT Group sold its 50% shareholding to the National Pension Service of South Korea.

On 7 May 2022, and after more than 30 years of trade in the centre, Target closed its store to make way for the centre's $5.1 million redevelopment. This redevelopment will include a large French sports megastore Decathlon and new stores in the former Target tenancy. The development will also include facade amendments, including signage, a new entry and a rooftop mechanical deck. Sixteen parking spaces on the rooftop level which features the current Big W and Target entrances were removed.

== Tenants ==
Erina Fair has 113,643m² of floor space. The major retailers include Myer, Big W, Kmart, Aldi, Coles, Harris Farm Markets, Woolworths, Cotton On, H&M, Uniqlo, JB Hi-Fi, The Good Guys, Rebel, Intencity, Erina Ice Arena and Hoyts Cinema.

== Transport ==
Erina Fair has bus connections to The Entrance, The Entrance North, Ettalong Beach, Gosford, Matcham, North Avoca, Saratoga, Terrigal, Woy Woy and Wyong, as well as local surrounding suburbs. It is served by Busways and Red Bus CDC NSW. The majority of its bus services are located on Terrigal Drive, Karalta Road and as well as the bus stop inside the centre.

Erina Fair has multi level car parks with 4,528 spaces.

== Incidents ==
- On 4 May 2017, security was called to a sports store around 8:30pm after reports of an altercation between a group of people. Police were called and attended the scene and commenced investigations. They were told that during the altercation, one of the men produced a knife. No one was injured during the incident.
- On 5 May 2020, a 20-year-old man sitting in his car ground floor car park was approached by a group of teenage boys. The group of teenagers started yelling at the man, before one of the boys jumped on the bonnet of the car and kicked the windscreen and another on spat on the car window. When the group left, the man drove out of the car park and contacted security.
