= East Gosford =

- Suburb
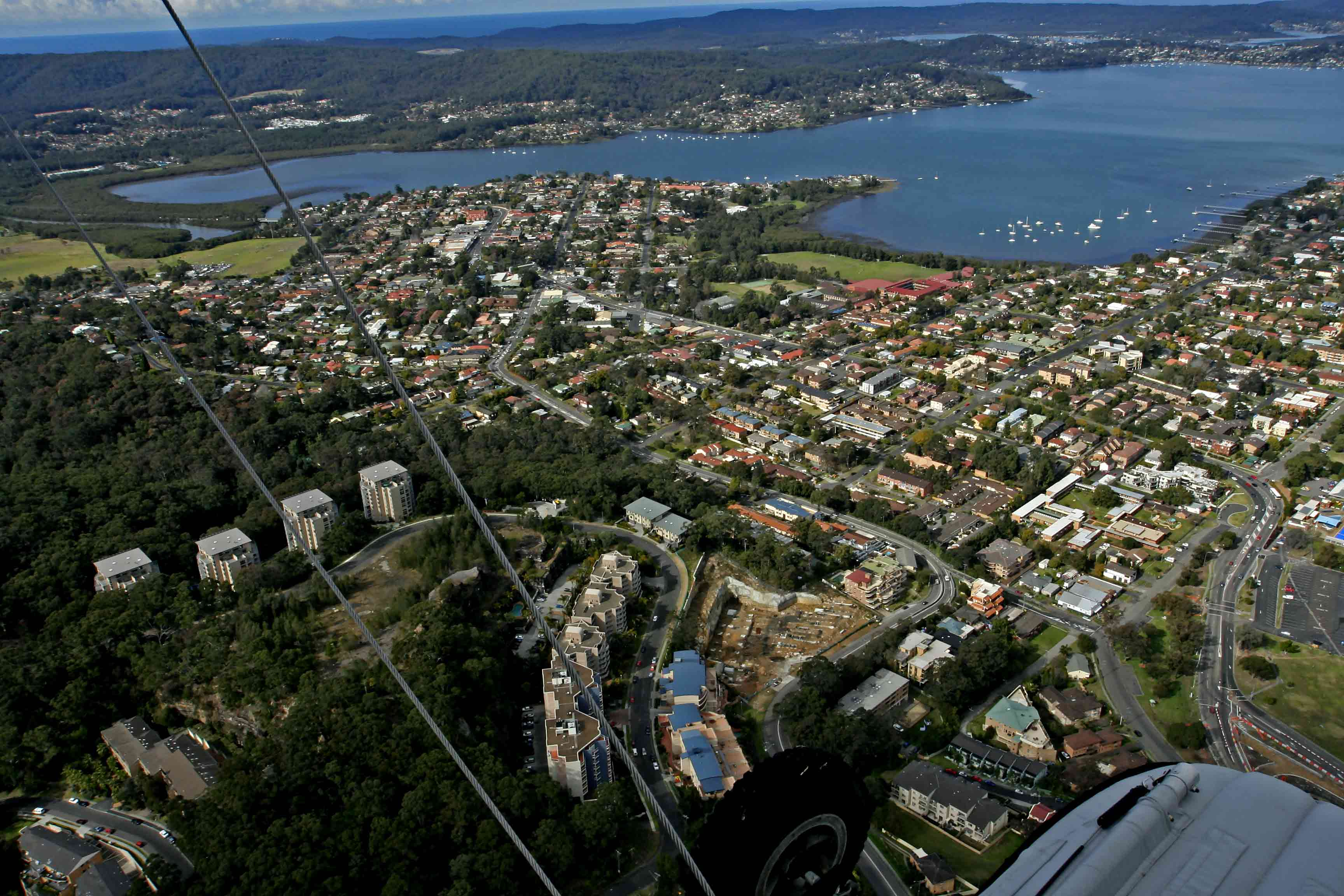
- An aerial view of East Gosford

- Interactive map of East Gosford
- Coordinates: 33°25′55″S 151°21′04″E
- Country: Australia
- State: New South Wales
- City: Central Coast
- LGA: Central Coast Council
- Location: 2 km (1.2 mi) SE of Gosford; 75 km (47 mi) N of Sydney; 20 km (12 mi) S of The Entrance; 93 km (58 mi) S of Newcastle
- Established: 1991 (Note: 1991 refers to the year East Gosford was officially recognised as a suburb. The area was referred to as East Gosford prior to this date.)

Government
  - State electorates: Gosford; Terrigal
  - Federal division: Robertson

Area
  - Total: 2.1 km^{2} (0.81 sq mi)
- Elevation: 14 m (46 ft)

Population
  - Total: 4,391 (SAL 2021)
- Postcode: 2250
- Parish: Gosford
Suburbs around East Gosford
Gosford	North Gosford	Springfield
Gosford	East Gosford	Erina
Point Frederick	Brisbane Water	Brisbane Water

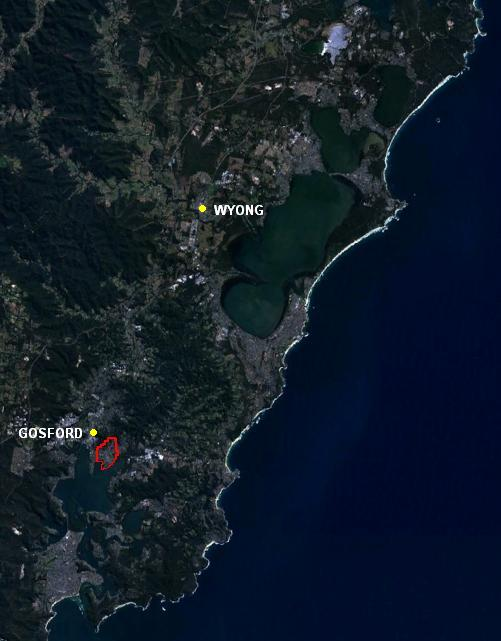
Location of East Gosford (red) within the Central Coast

East Gosford is a suburb of the Central Coast region of New South Wales, Australia, located immediately south-east of Gosford's town centre. It is part of the Central Coast Council local government area, and occupies an area previously inhabited by the Guringai (Wanangine) People. East Gosford is named after the Archibald Acheson, 2nd Earl of Gosford, with whom New South Wales Governor George Gipps served in Canada. Archibald Acheson was appointed Governor of British North America in 1835, and conducted a royal commission into the state of affairs in Lower Canada.

At the 2016 census East Gosford had a population of 4,238 people.

== History ==
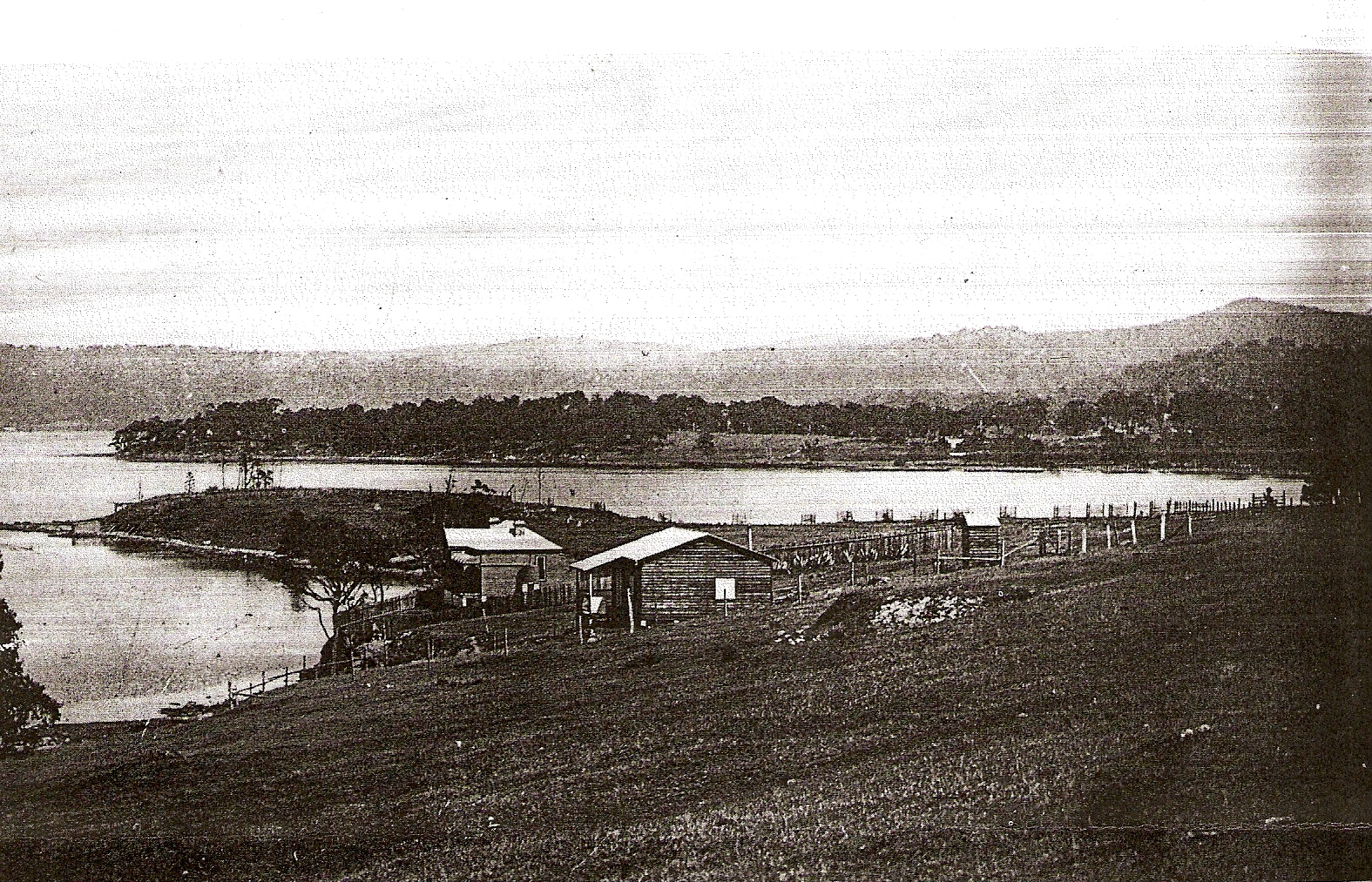
A photograph of Peeks Point in 1921. Caroline Bay and Point Frederick are in the background.

The site where East Gosford now stands changed hands twice before being sold to Samuel Peek, a Sydney tea merchant. East Gosford was surveyed in 1841 and within a year, began to develop, when Peek began to sell land there. A wharf and several shops were built. After building a three-story hotel, Peek and his family went to England in 1850. Returning in 1857, their ship wrecked near the Gap, and all family members perished. Many of his private papers were lost in the wreck, and he left no heirs, so many of his buildings decayed with bricks, doors and woodwork disappearing.

In 1858 a small sandstone church was built and was centrally located for parishioners from Erina, Gosford and Terrigal. However, when the railway was opened, more people began to live closer to Gosford. The church became unused and so it was decided to move the church, stone-by-stone to Mann Street, Gosford where it is still located.

Located on the eastern border of East Gosford is Erina Creek. Originally the creek provided access to the many ketches and steamers which came in and out on timber business. A man operating a punt carried people and their goods across Erina Creek. In 1884 the Government called tenders for the construction of an iron drawbridge with timber approaches. On 15 September, the tender of John Johnstone was accepted and work began. The bridge was completed in 1886, probably early in the year, at a cost of £3,695/15/-, which was considerably more than the average cost of £500 for country bridges. Part of the bridge rolled back towards the Gosford side by means of wheels guided on rails. This was achieved by men cranking the mechanism by hand. The bridge was opened seven times a day. The last of the steamers to go through was the Lone Pine in 1928. The old Punt Bridge, as it was called, was replaced by a modern bridge built by Beattie and Frost Pty Ltd of Gosford in 1962. It is still known as The Punt Bridge and forms part of the Central Coast Highway.

In 1913 two sisters, the Misses Marion and Aileen Macabe, opened a school for girls at Boomera, later known as Hinemoa Private Hospital in Masons Parade, Gosford. Some years later the expanded school was moved into Mona Vale built by William Rogers. Completed in 1889, this residence now forms part of St Edward's College. The property on which Mona Vale was built was part of an original 20 acres (8 ha) crown grant to surveyor William Shone in 1844. Subsequent owners were Charles Venteman, James Harrison and William Tyrrell, Bishop of Newcastle. It was Tyrrell's death in 1879 which led to the subdivision and public auction of the property. A portion was bought by William Rogers for £490. He demolished an earlier house on the land when he built Mona Vale. The school took boarders and day students (the latter included a few small boys), and offered a very wide range of subjects. Extras such as Esperanto, elocution, dancing and music could be undertaken and popular sports were swimming, rowing and tennis. Gosford livery stable owner Sam Ranyard assisted Aileen Maccabe in giving horse-riding instructions and also supplied horses. In 1923 the MacCabe sisters were faced with overcrowding problems and moved their school to Lindfield, where it was known as Marshall Mount.

Negotiations began in 1951 between the Christian Brothers and Mr W. Rogers for the purchase of Mona Vale and adjacent land. St Edward's College construction started in 1952 and Mona Vale was restored. In the 1970s the old house again underwent restoration and was used as a staffroom and administration centre for the college until 2005.

There are currently four schools in East Gosford. St Patrick's, a Catholic school and Gosford East Public School both cater for boys and girls from kindergarten to year six. St. Edward's Christian Brothers College, a Catholic boys' school, and St. Joseph's Catholic College, a girls' school, both cater for students from years seven to twelve.

Gosford Regional Gallery and Gosford/Edogawa Commemorative Garden are located in East Gosford. The Commemorative Garden is a Japanese garden that was built as a gift to residents of Gosford City Council by the Ward of Edogawa, Tokyo, Japan. They were opened in September 1994.

In the past East Gosford had branches for all four major banks, however these had been progressively closed by 2000. As a result, the Chamber of Commerce sought to open a Bendigo Bank Community branch. The branch was opened on 5 August 2000. The branch has been credited with a turnaround in retail trading in East Gosford. The East Gosford Community Bank has now expanded and operates a second branch at Lisarow and an agency at Kincumber.

In 2004 a pedestrian bridge over York Street was opened to make it safer for children at East Gosford's four schools to cross. The road was identified in 2002 as the section most in need of a bridge in 2002 in a Roads & Traffic Authority report. The bridge cost $2.5 million to build and included two lifts for disabled access. It is funded by advertising on roadside panels throughout the Gosford local government area. The Government was criticised during construction as the opening appeared to be delayed so that it could be opened by the local state member. On 9 August 2006 the main road through East Gosford was designated the Central Coast Highway to guide motorists unfamiliar with the region.

== Population ==
According to the 2016 census of Population, 4,238 people in East Gosford.

- Aboriginal and Torres Strait Islander people made up 2.7% of the population.
- 72.3% of people were born in Australia. The next most common country of birth was England at 4.8%.
- 82.5% of people spoke only English at home.
- The most common responses for religion were No Religion 27.2%, Catholic 25.5% and Anglican 18.3%.
