= North Gosford =

Coordinates: 33°24′54″S 151°21′04″E

- Suburb
- Interactive map of North Gosford
- Country: Australia
- State: New South Wales
- City: Central Coast
- LGA: Central Coast Council
- Location: 2 km (1.2 mi) N of Gosford; 77 km (48 mi) N of Sydney; 23 km (14 mi) SW of The Entrance; 90 km (56 mi) S of Newcastle

Government
  - State electorates: Gosford; Terrigal; The Entrance
  - Federal division: Robertson

Area
  - Total: 2 km^{2} (0.77 sq mi)
- Elevation: 7 m (23 ft)

Population
  - Total: 3,700 (2016 census)
  - Density: 1,900/km^{2} (4,800/sq mi)
- Postcode: 2250
- Parish: Gosford
Suburbs around North Gosford
Narara	Wyoming	Mount Elliot
Gosford	North Gosford	Springfield
Gosford	East Gosford	Springfield

North Gosford is a south-western suburb of the Central Coast region of New South Wales, Australia immediately north-east of Gosford's central business district. It is part of the Central Coast Council local government area.

North Gosford is notable for the region's largest private hospital and for Laycock Street Theatre, the region's principal theatre for live dramatic and musical theatre.
