= Gosford Hospital =

- Central Coast Local Health District

Geography
- Location: Gosford, Central Coast, New South Wales, Australia
- Coordinates: 33.4197°S 151.3399°E

Organisation
- Care system: Public Medicare (AU)
- Type: General and Teaching
- Affiliated university: University of Newcastle University of New England
- Network: Central Coast Local Health District

Services
- Emergency department: Yes
- Beds: 484

Helipads
- Helipad: (ICAO: YXGS)
Number	Length		Surface
Number	ft	m	Surface
1			concrete

History
- Founded: Gosford District Hospital in 1945
- Opened: 2018

Links
- Website: Government Website
- Lists: Hospitals in Australia

Gosford Hospital is a teaching state owned public hospital in Gosford on the Central Coast in New South Wales, Australia. It is the main hospital of the Central Coast Local Health District (CCLHD) of northern New South Wales which is a division of New South Wales Ministry of Health. Gosford Hospital provides a range of medical, surgical and maternity services to the Central Coast Local Health District.

== History ==
The former hospital in Gosford, Gosford District Hospital, was opened by Hon C.A. Kelly, M.L.A., on 26 May 1945.

There have been progressive upgrades and expansion to the medical, patient, and staff facilities throughout the history of the hospital. This includes the adaption of buildings in and around the hospital to provide additional health services.

== Operations ==
The hospital's emergency department is the third busiest in the state. Patients needing advanced care in specialties not present in Gosford, such as cardio-thoracic or neurosurgery, are transferred to other NSW hospitals including Royal North Shore Hospital, Royal Alexandra Hospital for Children in Sydney or John Hunter Hospital in Newcastle.

Gosford Hospital is a multi-level building covering eleven storeys and is a teaching hospital affiliated with the University of Newcastle and the University of New England. Medical, nursing, and allied health students are placed there for practical terms.

== Speciality services ==
Service	Notes
Emergency Department
Intensive Care Unit
Urology
Children's medical service
Haematology
General surgery
Vascular surgery service
Neurology
Cardiology
Gastroenterology and hepatology
Health information and referral

== See also ==
- List of hospitals in Australia
