= Holgate, New South Wales =

Holgate
- Suburb
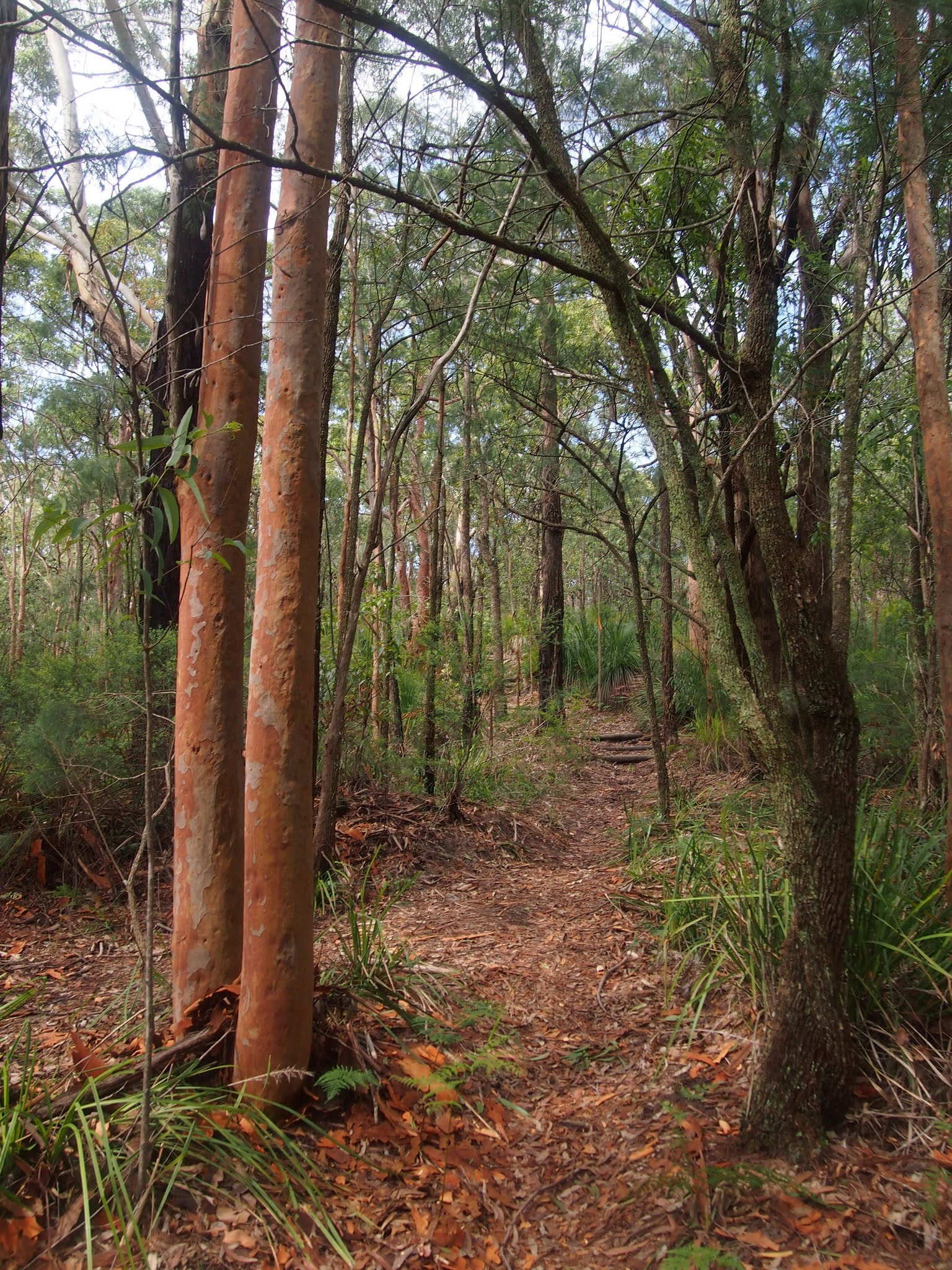
- Mouat Trail through Holgate

- Interactive map of Holgate
- Coordinates: 33°24′25″S 151°24′36″E
- Country: Australia
- State: New South Wales
- City: Central Coast
- LGA: Central Coast Council
- Location: 10 km (6.2 mi) ENE of Gosford; 16 km (9.9 mi) SW of The Entrance; 99 km (62 mi) NNE of Sydney

Government
  - State electorate: Terrigal
  - Federal division: Dobell, Robertson

Area
  - Total: 13.3 km^{2} (5.1 sq mi)
- Elevation: 19 m (62 ft)

Population
  - Total: 972 (2016 census)
  - Density: 73.08/km^{2} (189.3/sq mi)
- Postcode: 2250
- Parish: Kincumber
Suburbs around Holgate
Lisarow	Tumbi Umbi	Tumbi Umbi
Mount Elliot	Holgate	Matcham
Springfield	Springfield	Matcham

Holgate is a semi-rural suburb on the Central Coast of the state of New South Wales, Australia. Holgate is located just north-east of Gosford. It is part of the Central Coast Council local government area.

It is located approximately five minutes from Erina and the shopping destination "Erina Fair", as well as seven minutes from beaches including Terrigal Beach.

Holgate contains some great attractions including Firescreek Winery, Bamboo Buddha, the Matcham Valley Pony Club, and other attractions including the Katandra Reserve. This reserve contains a number of walking trails and Seymour Lake, a recreational destination. Holgate has been the base for many suburban runners since they can train at the Katandra Reserve. "Katandra" is an aboriginal word meaning "Song of Birds".

Holgate is the area of land on the Western side of the Matcham Estate bounded to the north by Tumbi Umbi, the west by Lisarow and the south by Erina.

It is part of the 2560 acres granted to Charles Horatio Matcham, a nephew of Lord Nelson. The first settlers to buy land on the Matcham Estate in the Holgate area were Captain and Mrs Heyne, who came here on their honeymoon in February 1908, when Captain Heyne was on furlough from the Indian Army. They returned in 1921 to take up permanent residence and had a long association with the area. Mrs Heyne lived to the age of 92 years and died in Gosford on 30 December 1976.

In the early 1920s, the residents formed a Progress Association. One of the achievements was the successful petition to establish a telephone office in the area. This was opened on 25 July 1924, a year later it became an unofficial post office.

The Postmaster General asked the local residents for a suggestion for a name. The choice was Holgate submitted by Mrs Pollard, as it was the name of the town near York, England, where she had lived before coming to Australia.

Extracted from the Matcham and Holgate Hall news magazine.
