= Point Frederick, New South Wales =

Coordinates: 33°25′55″S 151°20′06″E

Point Frederick Central Coast, New South Wales
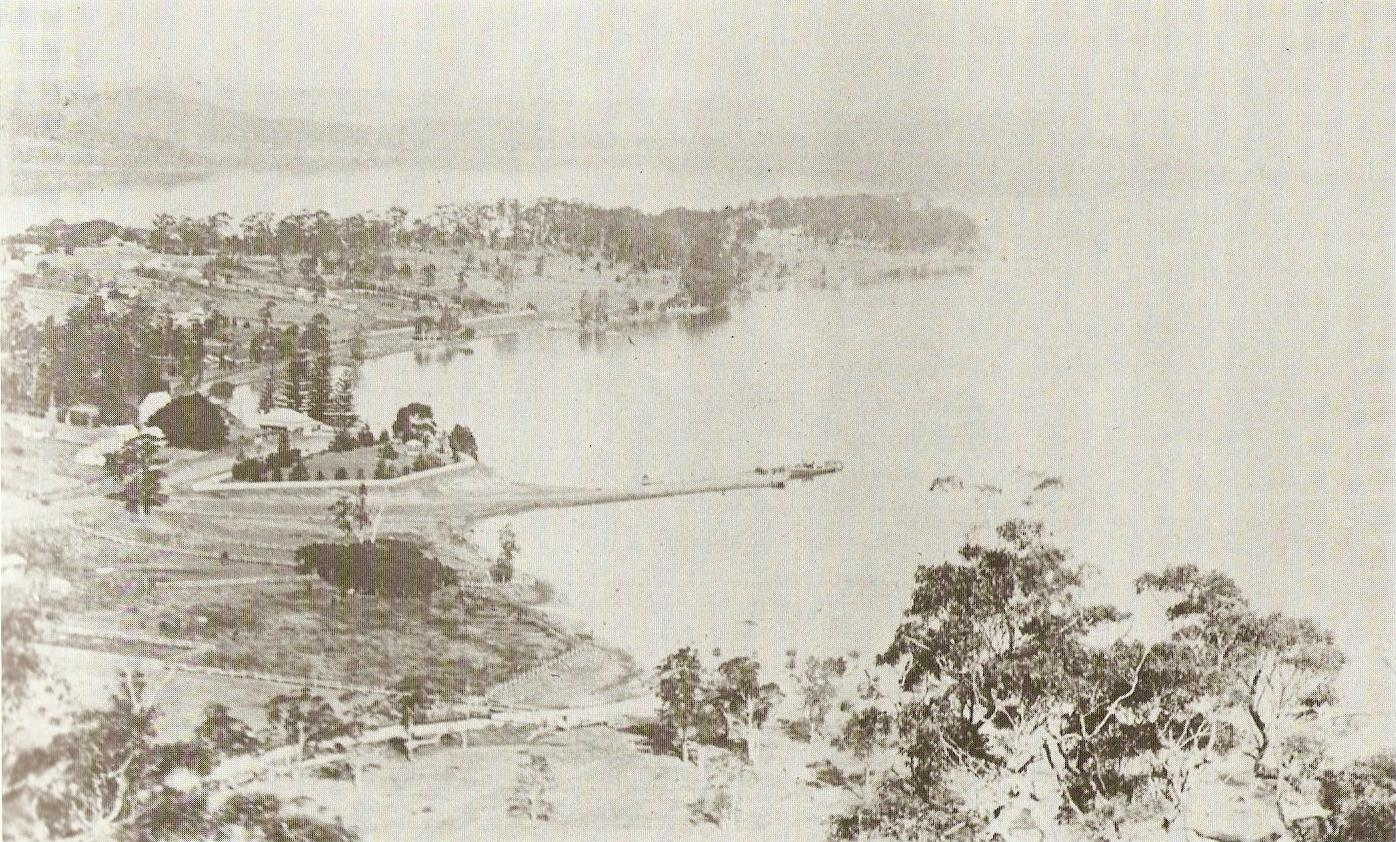
- An early view from Presidents Hill showing Point Frederick
- Population: 1,927 (2016 census)
  - Density: 3,210/km^{2} (8,300/sq mi)
- Postcode(s): 2250
- Elevation: 14 m (46 ft)
- Area: 0.6 km^{2} (0.2 sq mi)
- Location: 2 km (1 mi) SSE of Gosford; 77 km (48 mi) NNE of Sydney; 21 km (13 mi) SSW of The Entrance; 92 km (57 mi) SSW of Newcastle
- LGA(s): Central Coast Council
- Parish: Gosford
- State electorate(s): Gosford
- Federal division(s): Robertson
Suburbs around Point Frederick:
Gosford	Gosford	East Gosford
Point Clare	Point Frederick	East Gosford
	Brisbane Water

Point Frederick is a suburb of the Central Coast region of New South Wales, Australia on a peninsula protruding into Brisbane Water 2 kilometres (1 mi) south-southeast of Gosford's central business district. It is part of the Central Coast Council local government area.

== Pioneer Park ==
Point Frederick is one of the oldest areas on the Central Coast and is also home to Pioneer Park. Pioneer Park has great historical significance and hosts a graveyard in which various inhabitants of the point were buried long ago. Pioneer Park is also a popular outing place for tourists, and many families, to enjoy picnics.
