= Matcham, New South Wales =

Coordinates: 33°24′54″S 151°25′34″E

Matcham
- Suburb
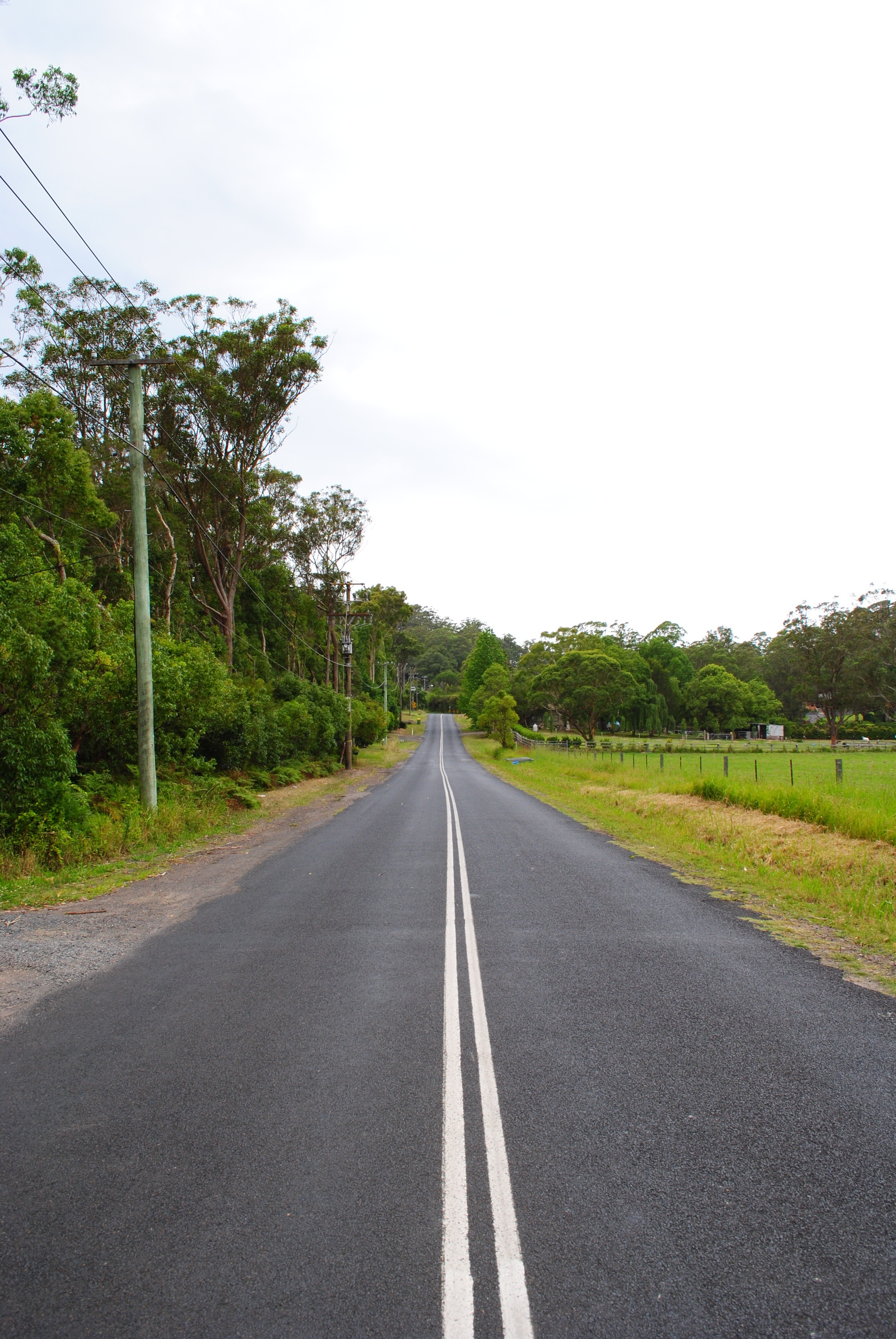
- Interactive map of Matcham
- Country: Australia
- State: New South Wales
- City: Central Coast
- LGA: Central Coast Council
- Location: 12 km (7.5 mi) E of Gosford; 6 km (3.7 mi) NW of Terrigal; 15 km (9.3 mi) SSW of The Entrance; 98 km (61 mi) NNE of Sydney

Government
  - State electorate: Terrigal
  - Federal division: Dobell

Area
  - Total: 4.1 km^{2} (1.6 sq mi)
- Elevation: 32 m (105 ft)

Population
  - Total: 987 (2016 census)
  - Density: 240.7/km^{2} (623/sq mi)
- Postcode: 2250
- Parish: Kincumber
Suburbs around Matcham
	Tumbi Umbi	Tumbi Umbi
Holgate	Matcham	Wamberal
	Erina Heights	Wamberal

Matcham is a semi-rural suburb of the Central Coast region of New South Wales, Australia. It is part of the Central Coast Council local government area and included in the electoral district of Terrigal. It has a hall and a historic church, St. George's Church, established in 1925.

== Origin of the name Matcham ==
The Matcham Estate was a grant of 2,560 acres to Charles Horatio Nelson Matcham, a nephew of Lord Horatio Nelson, 1st Viscount Nelson. Charles Horatio Matcham came to Sydney in 1828.

Charles Matcham of the Murrumbidgee River was promised the land as a primary grant and authorised to take possession from 18 October 1831. The deed is registered in book 59/129 and is dated 1 January 1840.

He remained at "Bogolong" Murrumbidgee, where he died on 11 March 1844.

The estate passed to his nephew and then through various hands without development until 1907, when George Matcham sold to Frank L Measures of Niagara Park. Between 1907 and 1910, Measures subdivided the estate into various portions, one of them eventually becoming the suburb of nearby Holgate.
