= Springfield, New South Wales (Central Coast) =

Springfield Central Coast, New South Wales
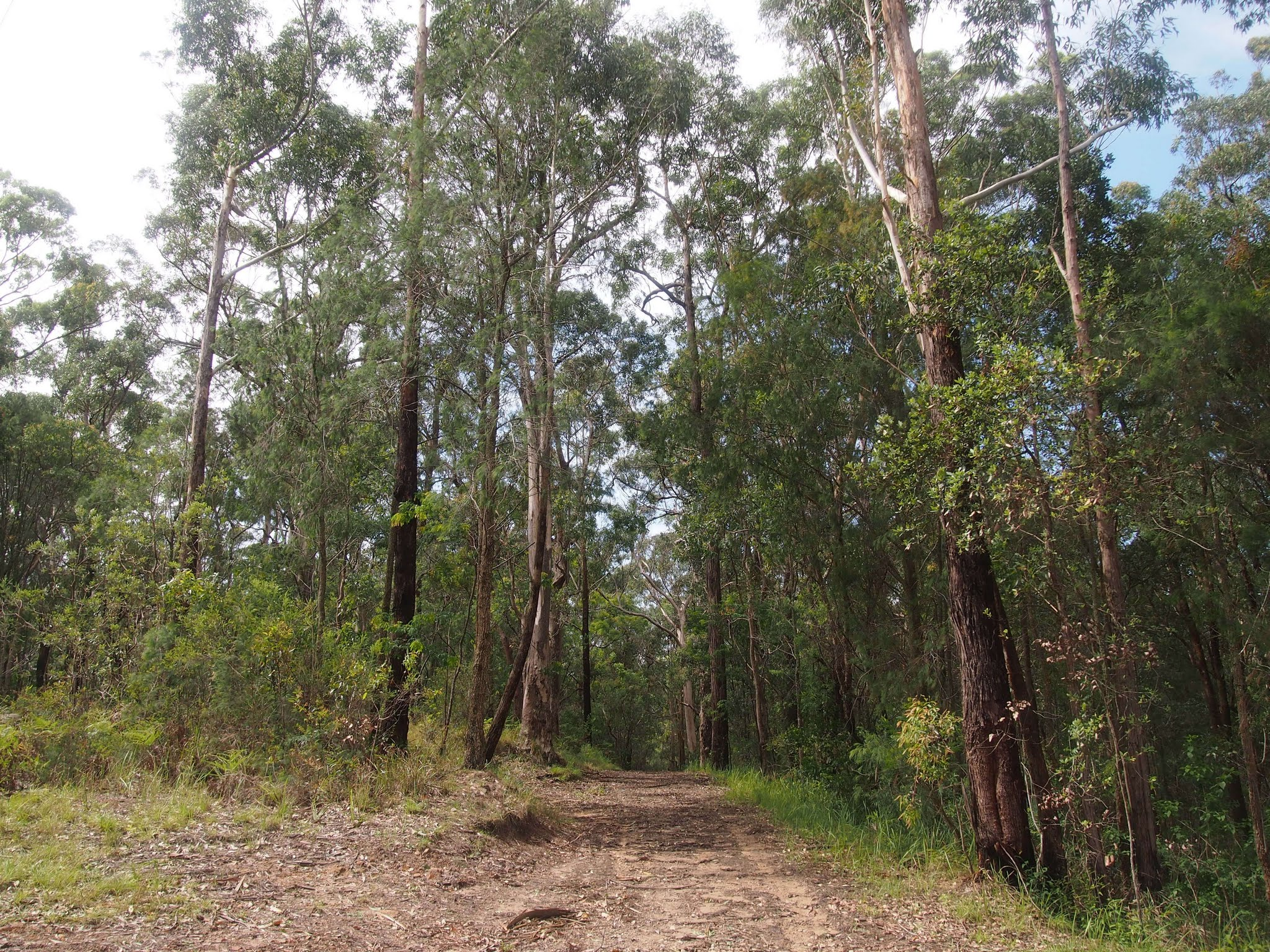

- Coordinates: 33°25′26″S 151°22′5″E
- Population: 4,310 (2021 census)
  - Density: 880/km^{2} (2,278/sq mi)
- Postcode(s): 2250
- Elevation: 13 m (43 ft)
- Area: 4.9 km^{2} (1.9 sq mi)
- Location: 4 km (2 mi) E of Gosford; 79 km (49 mi) NNE of Sydney; 19 km (12 mi) SW of The Entrance
- LGA(s): Central Coast Council
- Parish: Gosford
- State electorate(s): Terrigal; Gosford
- Federal division(s): Robertson
Suburbs around Springfield:
North Gosford	Mount Elliot	Holgate
East Gosford	Springfield	Erina
East Gosford	Green Point	Picketts Valley

Springfield is a suburb of the Central Coast region of New South Wales, Australia 4 kilometres (2 mi) east of Gosford's central business district via The Entrance Road. It is part of the Central Coast Council local government area. The state electoral seat is held in Gosford and Terrigal, for the federal Division of Robertson.
