= Erina, New South Wales =

Erina Central Coast, New South Wales
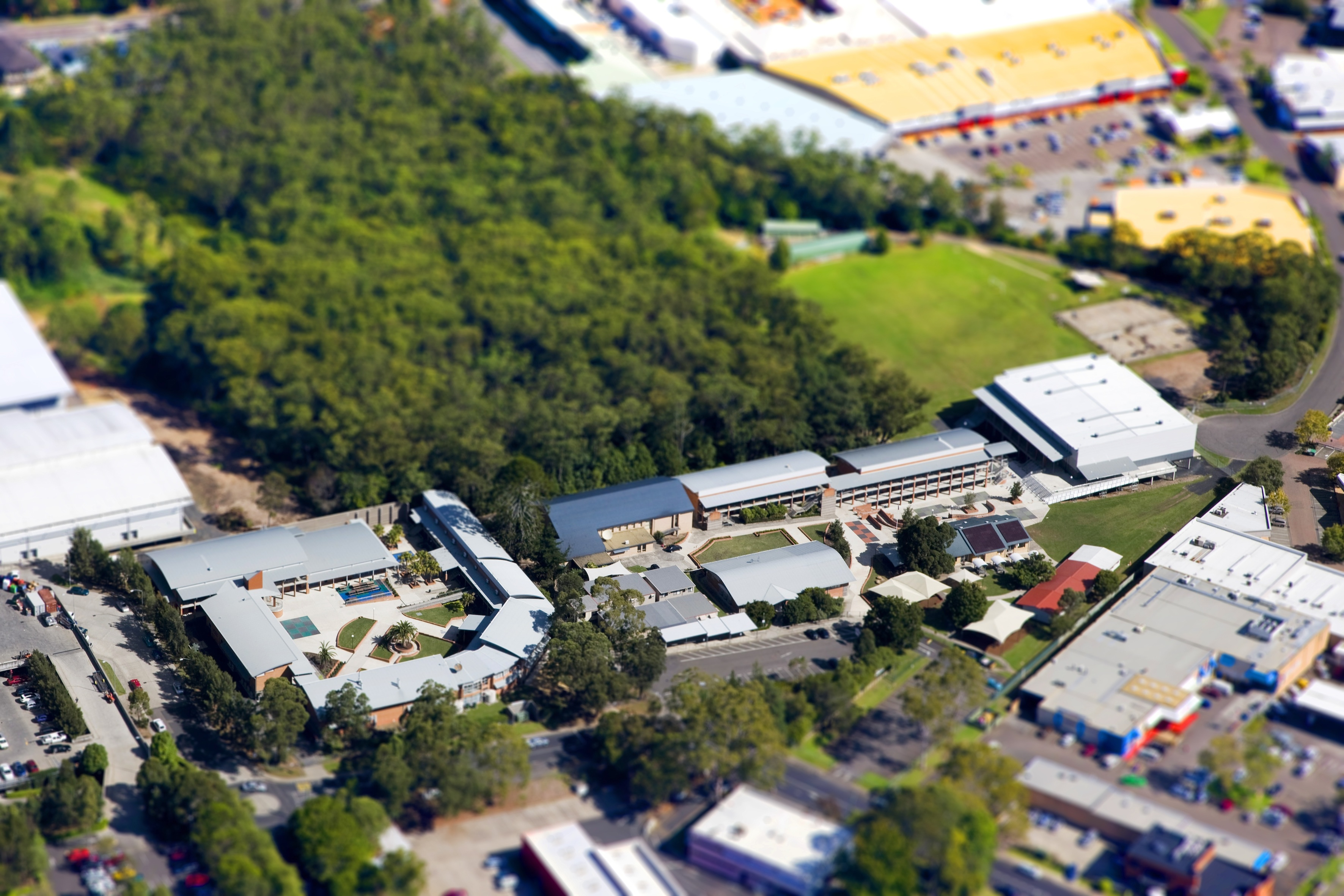
- Central Coast Adventist School campus in Erina

- Coordinates: 33°26′24″S 151°23′35″E
- Population: 4,774 (2016 census)
  - Density: 734/km^{2} (1,902/sq mi)
- Postcode(s): 2250
- Elevation: 32 m (105 ft)
- Area: 6.5 km^{2} (2.5 sq mi)
- Location: 7 km (4 mi) E of Gosford; 81 km (50 mi) NNE of Sydney; 6 km (4 mi) W of Terrigal; 17 km (11 mi) SW of The Entrance
- LGA(s): Central Coast Council
- Parish: Kincumber
- State electorate(s): Terrigal
- Federal division(s): Robertson
Suburbs around Erina:
Holgate	Erina Heights	Erina Heights
Springfield	Erina	Terrigal
Green Point	Picketts Valley	Terrigal

Erina (/ɛrənə/) is a suburb located in the Central Coast region of New South Wales, Australia. Erina is the largest commercial hub of the Central Coast and is home to the largest single level shopping centre in the Southern Hemisphere that is called Erina Fair. It is part of the Central Coast Council local government area.

Erina is located approximately halfway between Gosford and the Pacific Ocean at Terrigal. There are many other major commercial businesses located throughout the suburb predominantly on the Central Coast Highway, Karalta Road and Barralong Road.

The suburb is home to the Erina Eagles rugby league team, who play in the Central Coast Premiership. The 2017 Pacific-Asia Curling Championships were held at the Erina Ice Arena, which is situated in Erina Fair.

== History ==
The name Erina means "a place where the initiation ceremony was held". Erina was originally inhabited by the Garingai Aboriginal tribe. In 1888, the Erina was subdivided and the streets were planned.

== Commercial areas ==
The commercial areas of Erina are situated along Terrigal Drive, Barralong Road, Karalta Road and the Central Coast Highway. Erina Fair is a large single storey shopping centre located on Terrigal Drive in the centre of the suburb. There are also a few small shopping centres located on Karalta Road including Fountain Plaza, Elizabeth Court and Karalta Plaza.

== Population ==
In the 2016 Census, there were 4,774 people in Erina. 69.9% of people were born in Australia. The next most common country of birth was England at 8.1%. 85.0% of people spoke only English at home. The most common responses for religion were Catholic 24.3%, Anglican 22.5% and No Religion 21.5%.

== Education ==
Schools in the local area include:

- Erina High School is a comprehensive high school that was established in 1964.
- Woodport Public School (Formerly known as Erina West Primary School)
- Central Coast Adventist School

== Churches ==
Churches in Erina include EV Church and Coastlife Church. The Chinese Baptist Evelyn Tong Memorial Church was completed in late 2017.

== See also ==
- List of Central Coast suburbs
