= Wyong Musical Theatre Company =

Australian musical theatre

Wyong Musical Theatre Company (founded in 1996) is an Australian incorporated, not for profit, amateur musical theatre company situated on the Central Coast of Wyong, New South Wales.

== History ==
=== Early years ===
Prior to the foundation of Wyong Musical Theatre Company, Sandra Plowright, the founding member of the company, had a desire to bring musical theatre to the northern end of the Central Coast which, she felt, for years had been lacking on this part of the coast. In 1995 Sandra formed a committee of associates, with herself as president, with the goal of establishing a musical theatre company. Also on the committee were Michael Burke (Vice President), Pam Issacs (Treasurer), Carl Martin and Greg Derry (Floor Members). She and the committee began lobbying Wyong Shire Council and Councilors, along with Local Businesses, for support of this venture. Sandra was successful in gaining enough support and sponsorship from the local community to be able to mount an inaugural musical production of Guys and Dolls in 1996 which was performed in September of that year at the Wyong Memorial Hall. This production had as its Director Michael Burke, Musical Director Greg Derry and Choreographer Beverly Durkin. From that year on the Company strived to produce two adult productions each year with all participating personnel, volunteering their time and efforts freely for the production. In the 28 years since its foundation, no member of the company has been paid for their services.

=== Further Developments ===
Over the years Wyong Musical Theatre Company has also extended itself to include a Youth Theatre component in which suitable production for young people up to the age of 17 is staged. The first of these productions was The Lion, the Witch and the Wardrobe in 2004. Since then Wyong Musical Theatre Company has endeavored to produce at least one youth production each year.

Another extension to the company's interests was the establishment of a vocal harmony group entitled Encore (formed in 2011) who, over the years, have performed at many functions including local Anzac Day and Australia Day ceremonies as well as private functions. Its aim is to provide performance opportunities while developing harmony singing techniques and encouraging musical and performance development of participating members.

== Productions ==
List of Productions
1996	Guys and Dolls	
1997	Calamity Jane	The Sound of Music
1998	Bye Bye Birdie	Oklahoma
1999	Cinderella	The King & I
2000	Sing for Your Supper	HMS Pinafore
2001	The Wiz	Carousel
2002	The Pyjama Game	South Pacific
2003	Fiddler on the Roof	
2004	The Lion The Witch & The Wardrobe	Dames at Sea
2005	Annie Jr	Oliver!
2006	Guys and Dolls	Joseph and the Amazing Technicolor Dreamcoat
2007	Anything Goes	The Wizard of Oz
2008	Thoroughly Modern Millie	The Hunchback of Notre Dame
2009	The Pirates of Penzance	Grease
2010	The Music Man	Bye Bye Birdie
2011	Jesus Christ Superstar	High School Musical
2012	Calamity Jane	Peter Pan: The British Musical
2013	Eurobeat Almost Eurovision	Alice in Wonderland
2014	Hair	The Little Mermaid
2015	Rent	Mulan
2016	Oliver!	Beauty and the Beast
2017	Sweet Charity	Camp Rock
	Chitty Chitty Bang Bang	Elf
2018	Rock of Ages	Me and My Girl
