= Central Coast (New South Wales) =

- Region
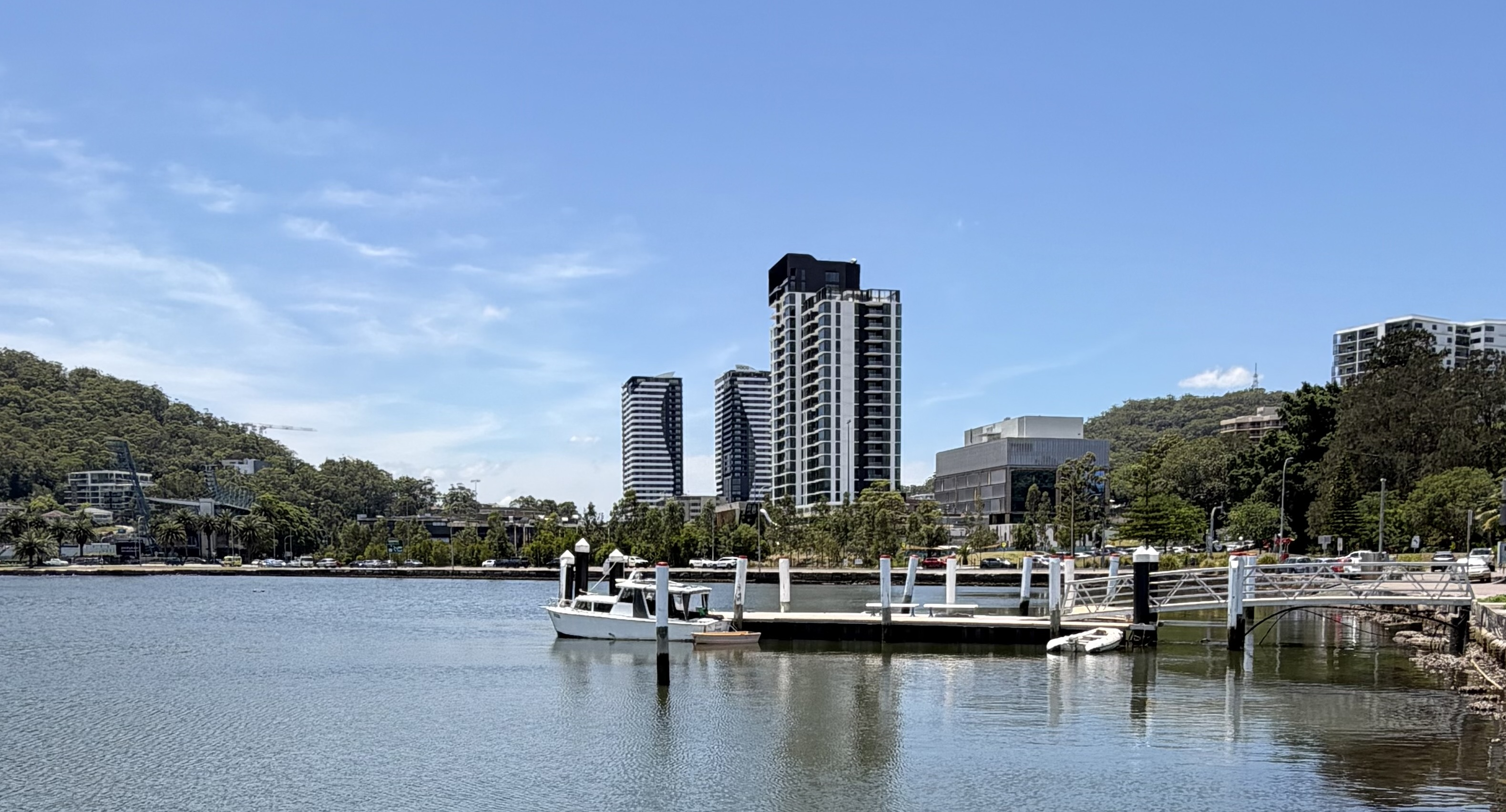
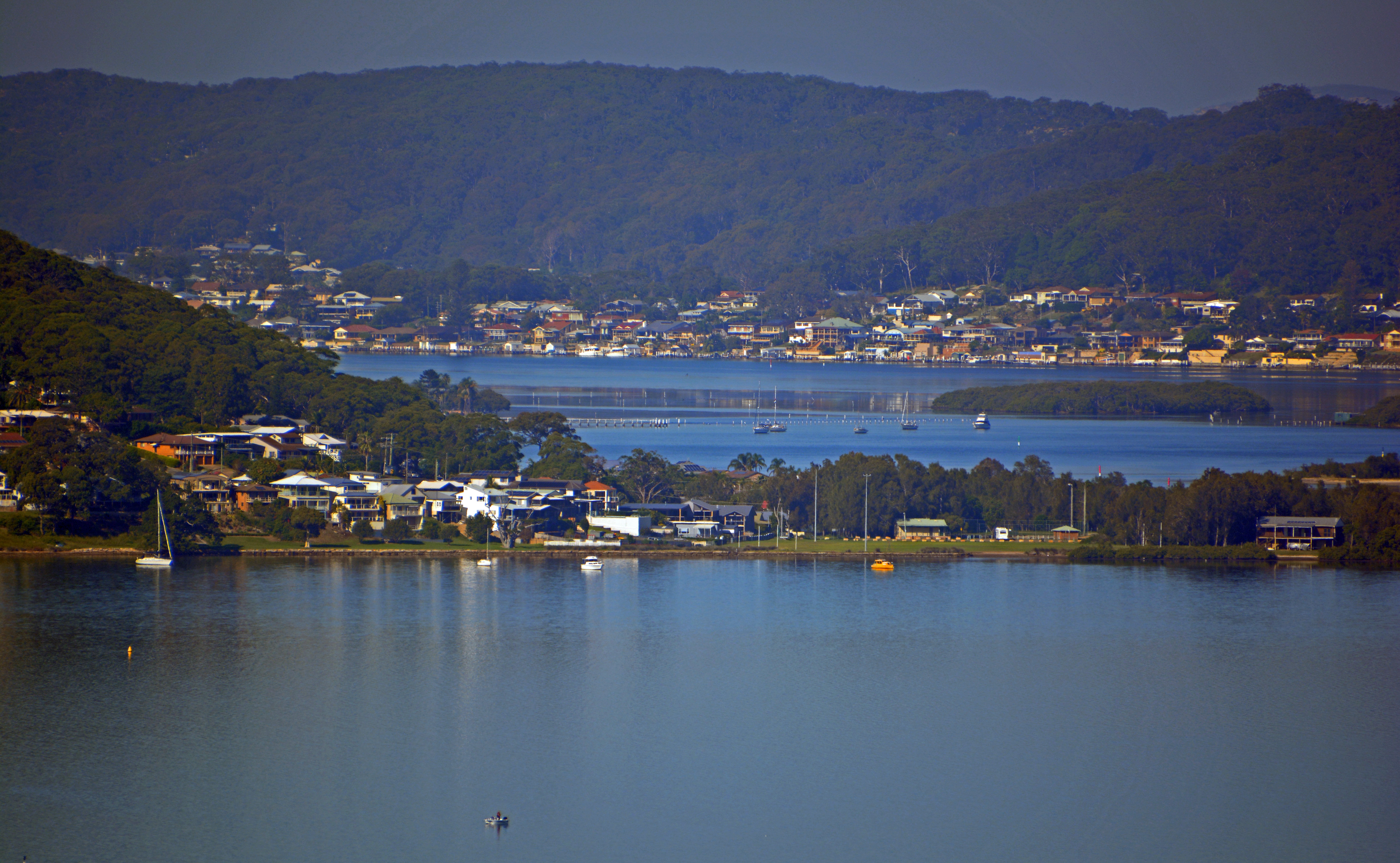
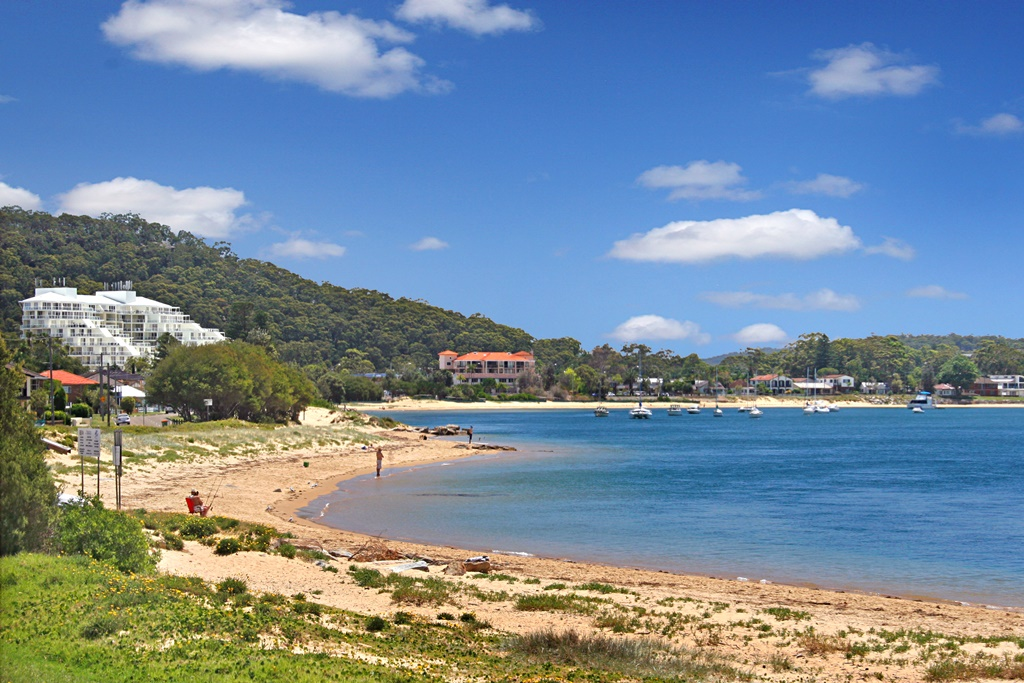
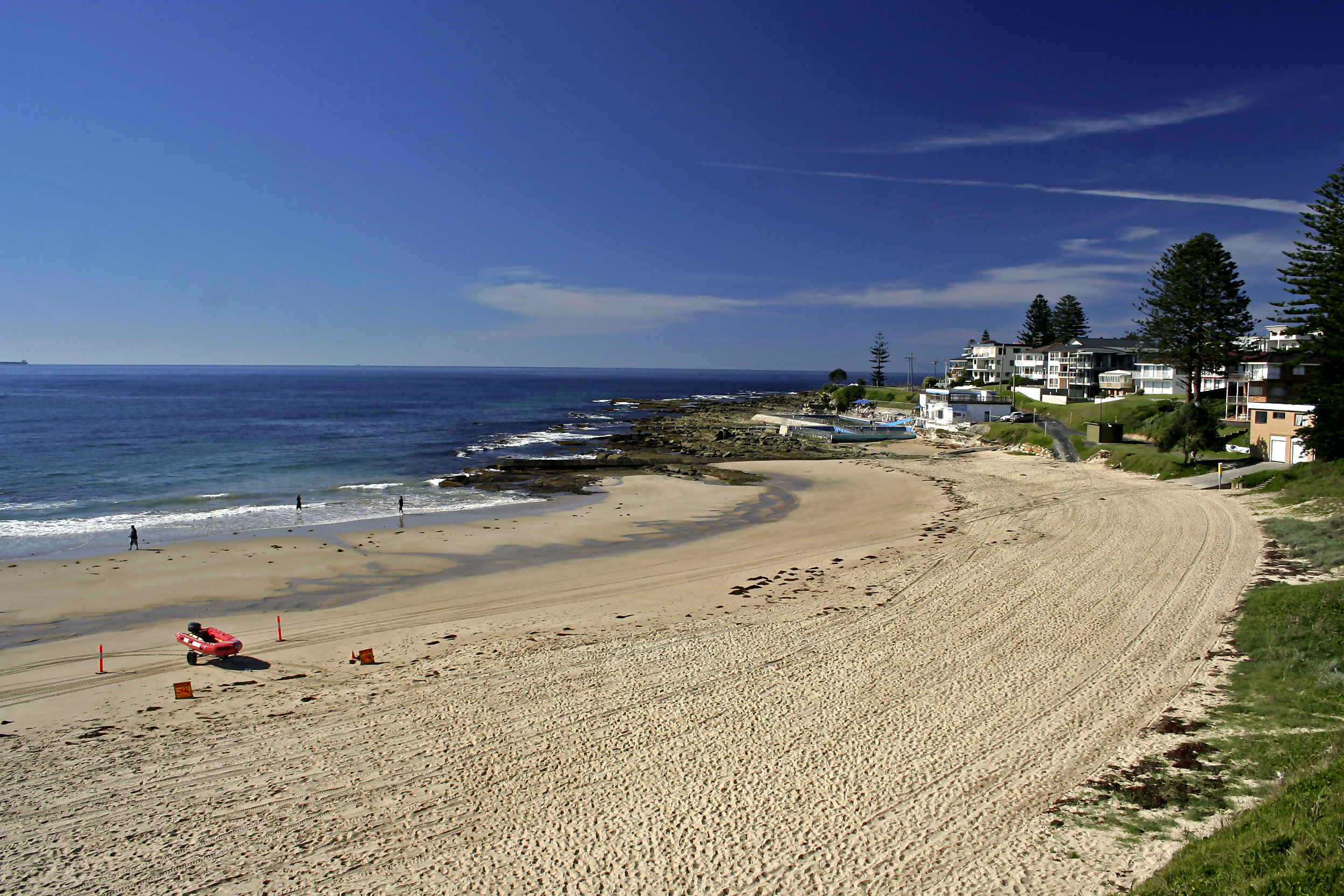
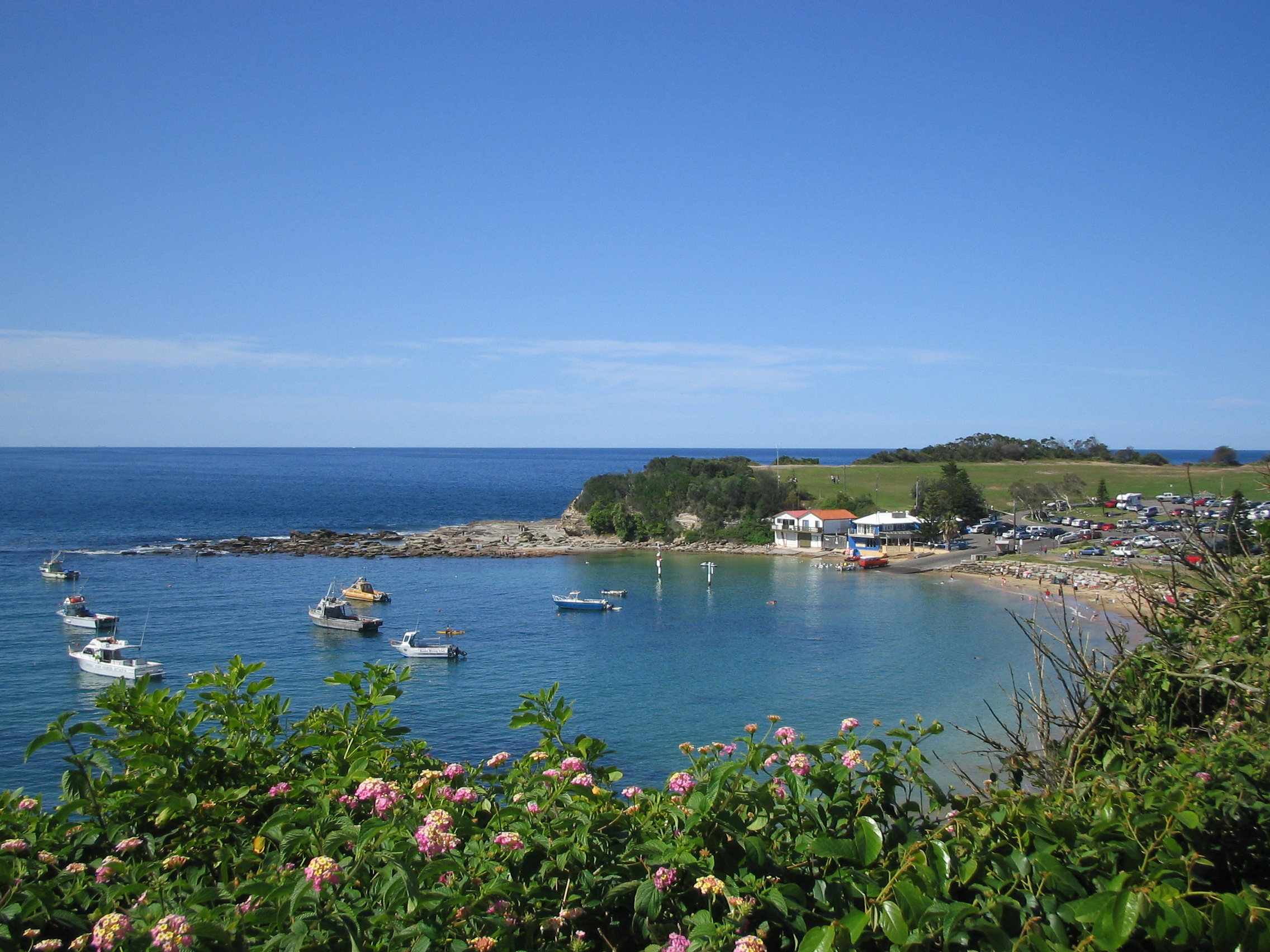
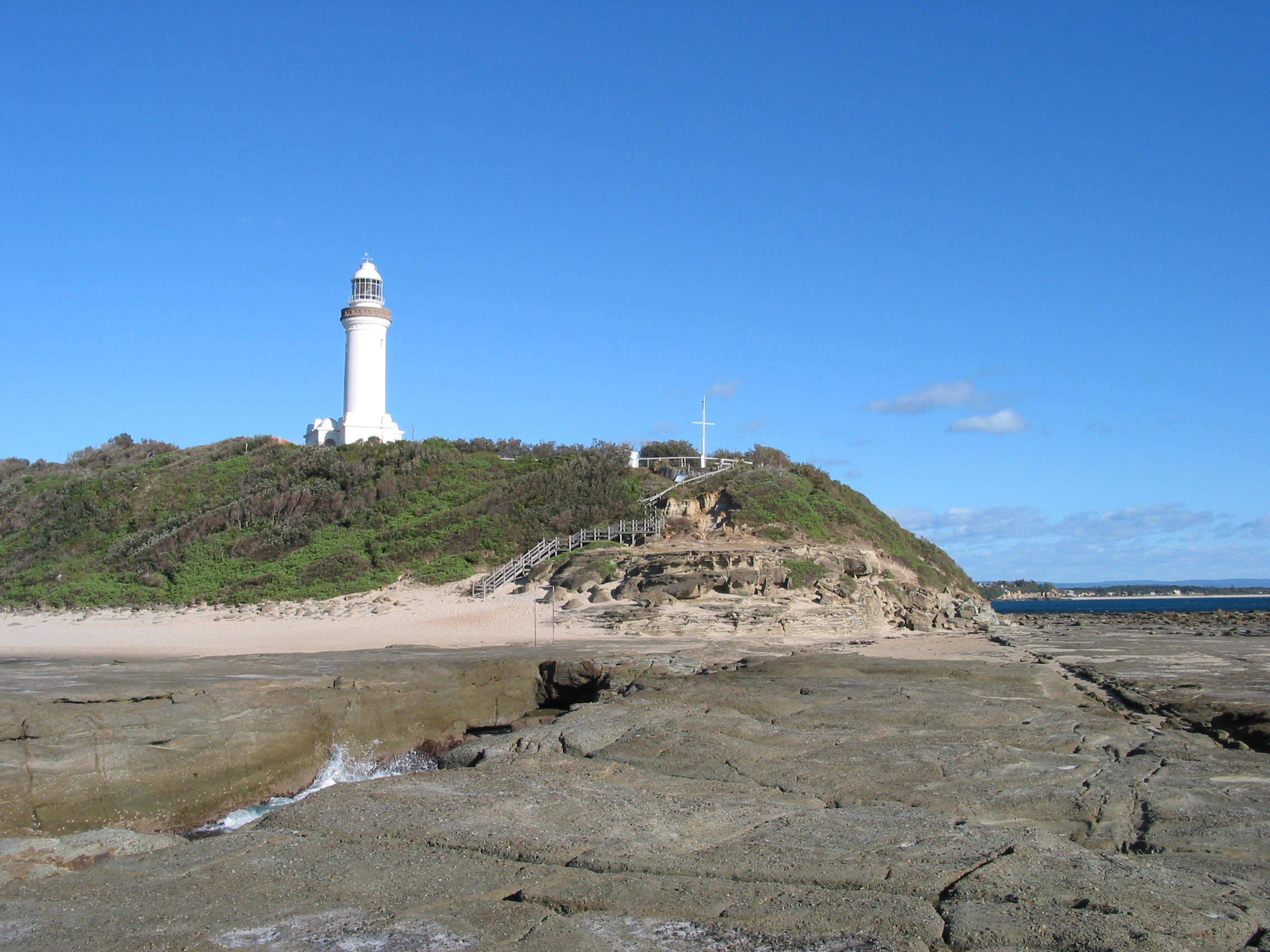
- Gosford Saratoga and Blackwall Ettalong Beach The Entrance Terrigal Norah Head

- Coordinates: 33°25′S 151°20′E
- Country: Australia
- State: New South Wales
- LGA: Central Coast Council
- Location: 77 km (48 mi) NNE of Sydney (Note: These figures are the distances from Sydney and Newcastle to Gosford, the major population hub in the region.); 86 km (53 mi) SW of Newcastle

Government
  - State electorates: Gosford; Swansea; Wyong; Terrigal; The Entrance
  - Federal divisions: Dobell; Robertson; Shortland

Area
  - Total: 1,681 km^{2} (649 sq mi)

Population
  - Total: 346,596 (2021) (10th)
  - Density: 206.18/km^{2} (534.02/sq mi)
- Time zone: UTC+10 (AEST)
  - Summer (DST): UTC+11 (AEDT)
Regions around Central Coast
Upper Hunter	Hunter	Tasman Sea
Blue Mountains Area (Greater Sydney)	Central Coast	Tasman Sea
Greater Sydney	Northern Sydney (Greater Sydney)	Tasman Sea

The Central Coast is a peri-urban region lying on the Pacific Ocean in northern New South Wales, Australia, just north of Sydney. The area is the third-largest urban area in New South Wales and the ninth-largest urban area in the country.

The Central Coast is generally considered to include the region bounded by the Hawkesbury River in the south, the Watagan Mountains in the west and Lake Macquarie, lying on the Sydney basin. The region is filled with subtropical national parks, forests and also encompasses the major coastal waterways of Brisbane Water, Tuggerah Lakes and southern Lake Macquarie. The region's hinterland has fertile valleys, rural farmland and wineries, and also includes the Watagan Mountains.

Gosford is the main commercial hub and gateway. The region is known for coastal towns like Woy Woy, Terrigal, The Entrance, Ettalong Beach, Budgewoi and Bateau Bay. They feature resorts, holiday parks and many expansive beaches and lagoons with surfing and coastal tracks, as well as scenic views.

== History ==
The region has been inhabited for thousands of years by Aboriginal people. The local Kuringgai people were the first Aboriginal people to come in contact with British settlers. An Aboriginal man from the region named Bungaree became one of the most prominent people of the early settlement of New South Wales. He was one of the first Aboriginal people to learn English and befriended the early governors Phillip, King and Macquarie. He accompanied explorer Matthew Flinders in circumnavigating Australia. Macquarie later declared Bungaree "The King of the Broken Bay Tribes".

In addition to Kuringgai-speaking people (referred to as the "Pittwater tribes" and "Broken Bay tribes" by early colonists), Awabakal lived around Lake Macquarie, and Darkinyung people lived inland, to the west of the Mooney Mooney Creek. The Kuringgai (Guriŋgai), Awaba and Darkinyung languages are related to each other, but are distinct from the Dharrug and Sydney languages that were spoken south of the Central Coast. Post-settlement disease, disruption and war greatly reduced the numbers of Aboriginal people.

In 1811, the Governor of New South Wales, Lachlan Macquarie, gave the first land grant in the region to William Nash, a former marine of the First Fleet. No further grants were made in the area until 1821.

== Geography ==
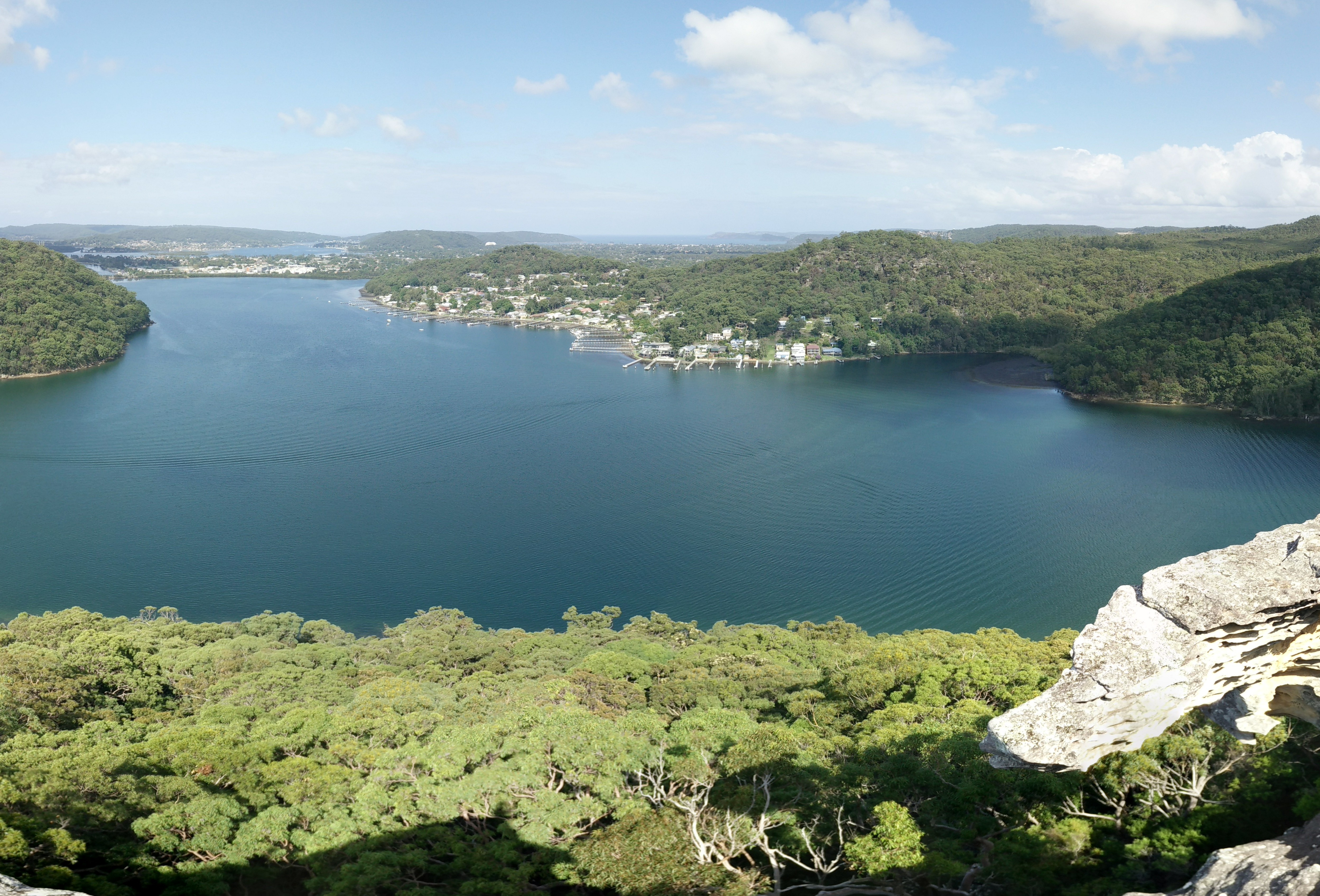
Woy Woy Bay from Spion Kop, with various suburbs in the background

The region is a network of towns that have been linked in recent years by expanding suburban development. The main urban cluster of the region surrounds the northern shore of Brisbane Water and includes the Coast's largest population centre, Gosford, stretching east to the retail centre of Erina. Other major commercial "centres" on the Coast are Wyong, Tuggerah, Lakehaven, The Entrance, Terrigal, Bateau Bay and Woy Woy.

On 2 December 2005, the Central Coast was officially recognised as a stand-alone region rather than an extension of Greater Sydney or the Hunter Valley. The New South Wales government reclassified the area as Regional, rather than its previous status as part of the Greater Sydney metropolitan area.

=== Climate ===
The Central Coast has a humid subtropical climate (Köppen climate classification: Cfa), with warm humid summers and mild winters. Rainfall is spread fairly evenly throughout the year, but is slightly more frequent during autumn. Winter is the driest time, with often minimal to no rain.

== Population ==
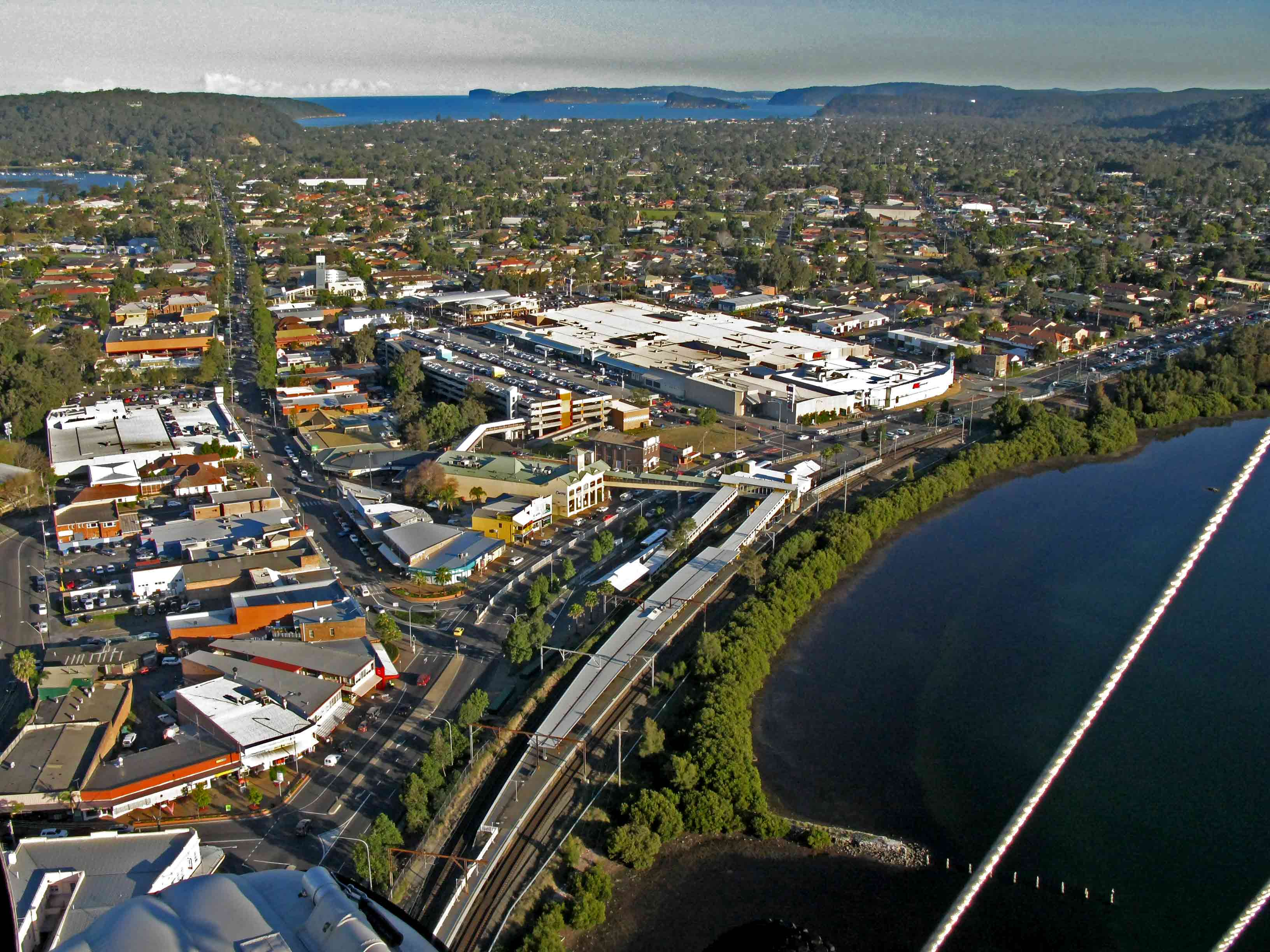
Suburbs such as Woy Woy are some of the more populated areas of the Central Coast region

The Australian Bureau of Statistics publishes population census data and regular population estimates on the Central Coast under a Significant Urban Area. In 2021, the estimated population of this region was 343,180, with population forecasts projecting it will grow by more than 20 per cent to 415,050 by 2035.

The median age was 43, with an Aboriginal and Torres Strait Islander population of 4.9%. The main countries of birth were Australia (78.9%), United Kingdom (4.6%), and New Zealand (1.7%). ABS currently includes the Central Coast region population wholly within Greater Sydney which results in Greater Sydney's population being larger than that of Greater Melbourne.

== Education ==
The Central Coast has two campuses of the University of Newcastle located at Ourimbah and Gosford Hospital. There are three campuses of the Hunter Institute of TAFE located at Gosford, Wyong and Ourimbah along with multiple private colleges. The Central Coast has a large number of primary and secondary school institutions.

== Culture ==
=== Media ===
==== Television ====
The Central Coast has four broadcast translators across the region, located at Bouddi (between Killcare & MacMasters Beach), Gosford and Wyong (Forresters Beach), and Mount Sugarloaf (Newcastle). Due to the Central Coast being split between the Sydney (metro) and Northern NSW (regional) licence areas, these translators carry stations from both areas.

In total eight television stations service the Central Coast:

- ABC New South Wales (ABN)
- SBS New South Wales (SBS)
- Seven Sydney (ATN)
- Nine Sydney (TCN)
- 10 Sydney (TEN)
- Seven Northern NSW (NEN)
- Nine Northern NSW (NBN)
- 10 Northern NSW (NRN) – Network 10 owned and operated station

Each station broadcasts a primary channel and several multichannels. Of the three main networks, NBN produces a bulletin containing local, national and international news screening every weeknight at 5:30pm on the Nine Network. Both Network 10 and the Seven Network produce short local updates to fulfill local content quotas. Foxtel is also available via satellite.

==== Radio ====
The Central Coast has a number of local radio stations. The three largest commercial stations are Triple M Central Coast, Star 104.5, Hit101.3 Central Coast, all being part of national networks.

The ABC Local Radio station, ABC Central Coast broadcasts on 92.5 FM operates a locally produced breakfast show from 6am to 9am weekdays from its studio in Gosford. A 24-hour Country music station TodayCountry94one is based in Gosford and broadcasts online and in syndication across the country. It also has a Christian radio station Rhema FM on 94.9 MHz. As at January 2021, The Central Coast has a locally based internet Radio Station providing locals with a radio station being broadcast by local presenters from their place of business/home.

In most locations on the Central Coast, Sydney and Newcastle radio stations can be received at reasonable levels particularly on the AM band.

==== Print ====
The Central Coast is not serviced by its own daily print newspaper, though has three weekly local newspapers as well as a fortnightly paper and several popular monthly newsletters.

A series of locally owned local papers have grown in popularity over time. Central Coast Community News services the Central Gosford region and the Coast Community Chronicle services the northern part of the region and the Pelican Post services the postcodes of 2256 and 2257. All are published by a local independent publishing house Central Coast Newspapers bucking the trend in declining newspaper sales. The Peninsula News run by a community association services the southern part of the region centred around the Woy Woy area with a fortnightly paper. Previously the major print publication of the region was the weekly Central Coast Express Advocate, published by News Limited's News Local, though that ceased printing in 2019. It is now purely a subscription-based online service.

=== Theatre ===
The area has four operating theatres.

Laycock Street Community Theatre, opened in 1988 located in Wyoming next to Gosford, has a proscenium arch configuration and seats 396 patrons. The venue also contains a multi-purpose 100 capacity studio space suitable for cabaret performances, solo acts, events, conferences, meetings, other small performance acts. Across its long history of presenting performances on the Central Coast it has supported original work by locals as well as performances by some of Australia's leading theatre companies and commercial producers. The nearby local amateur theatre group, the Gosford Musical Society, currently contribute 5 musicals a year including two specifically for young performers.

The Peninsula Theatre at Woy Woy features a 122-seat raked auditorium, 49m^{2} stage area and professional standard staging, lighting and sound capabilities. Local performing arts society Woy Woy Little Theatre uses The Peninsula Theatre as their key presenting venue for over 50 performances per year.

The largest theatre on the Central Coast is The Art House, Wyong, which opened in May 2016 and replaced the old Wyong Memorial Hall which was used mainly by Wyong Musical Theatre Company and Wyong Drama Group. The Art House is a multipurpose venue with a 500-seat proscenium arch theatre with a 12m x 9m stage and automated fly tower as well as a 285m^{2} studio space with retractable tiered seating for 130 people and AV link to the main theatre. The Art House also features a 500m^{2} space suited to functions and events, as well as an exhibition wall ideal for visual art and photography displays. The opening of this venue saw a sudden growth in arts companies producing theatre in the region including Endless Night Theatre Company, Nate Butler's Studio, Salt House Theatre Company, and the regions only youth theatre body, Jopuka Productions.

In late 2018, the Elderslee Foundation purchased a large building along the Tuggerah Strait close to Wyong which has subsequently been renovated and repurposed into a community facility, including office facilities, hot desks, training rooms, a commercial kitchen and art exhibition space for use by the community and the Red Tree Theatre, a small adaptable space for forums, seminars, concerts, theatre rehearsals and productions. The Red Tree Theatre features a 144-seat ranked auditorium equipped with professional standard lighting and sound.

=== Sport ===
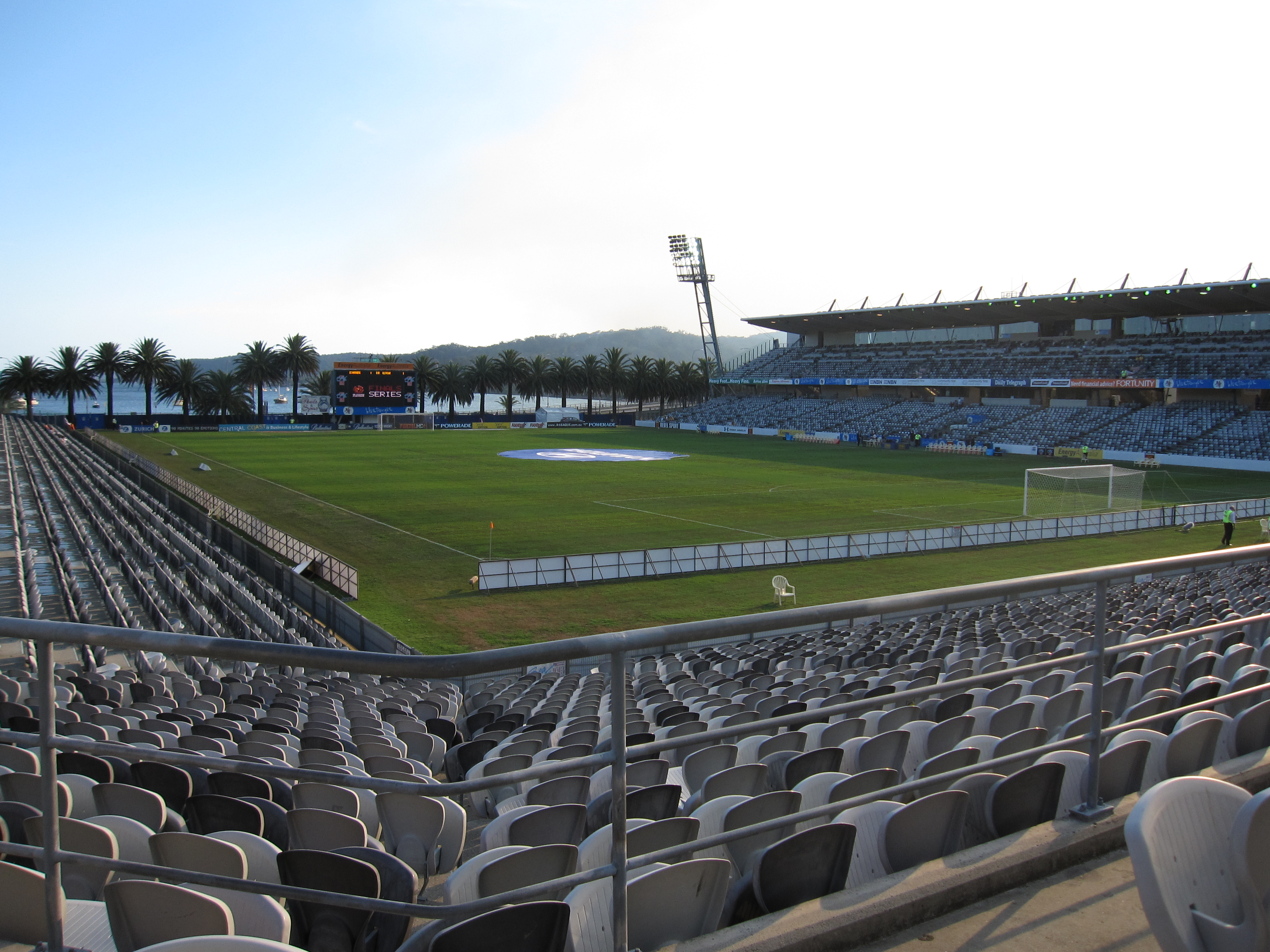
The Central Coast Stadium in Gosford, is the current home of the Central Coast Mariners.

Central Coast Mariners represent the Central Coast in the A-League. The Mariners have been A-League premiers twice (2007–08 and 2011–12), and were A-League champions in 2013 as well as in 2023 and again in 2024. The Mariners play out of Central Coast Stadium at Gosford, the largest stadium on the Central Coast with a capacity of 20,059.

The Wyong Roos currently play in the Intrust Super Premiership at Morry Breen Oval in Kanwal. They are the feeder team of the Sydney Roosters National Rugby League team, who have developed an agreement to play one regular season fixture per year at Central Coast Stadium for five years, starting in 2015. The South Sydney Rabbitohs also play regular games.

The Central Coast Rhinos played in the Australian Ice Hockey League from 2006 to 2008 and the Australian International Ice Hockey Cup from 2009 to 2012. They played out of Erina Ice Arena at Erina Fair, which is the Central Coast's only ice rink. The Erina Ice Arena has been closed since the 19th of August 2019 for renovations and is looking to reopen on the 2nd of January 2021.

Other teams include the Central Coast Crusaders – the elite senior basketball program of the Central Coast region and the Central Coast Centurions – the Central Coast's junior rugby league representative team who compete in the S.G. Ball Cup and the Harold Matthews Cup.

Several attempts have been made to have teams enter other national competitions. The most notable of these was the attempt to enter the Central Coast Bears as the 16th team into the NRL. This attempt was financed by a consortium led by John Singleton, but the Gold Coast Titans were ultimately successful. The Northern Eagles, a merger of NRL clubs Manly Sea Eagles and North Sydney Bears began their tenure playing half of their games at Gosford; however, within three years the team was solely playing back at Brookvale. South Sydney were also unsuccessfully approached to play out of Gosford, despite the few games that are played on the Central Coast attracting large crowds. The Central Coast Storm rugby league team play in a number of NSWRL lower grade competitions, and the Central Coast Waves rugby union team plays in the Shute Shield. The Central Coast Rays rugby union club who competed in the ill-fated Australian Rugby Championship's only season late in 2007, called Central Coast Stadium home.

The Central Coast has numerous sporting ovals, golf courses, skate parks, tennis courts and swimming pools that are open to the public and one target shooting facility. Attempts are underway to build a series of bicycle paths. A velodrome is also open to the public at West Gosford. National parks on the Central Coast have a large range of walking paths and mountain bike trails. Water sports like sailing, rowing and water skiing are popular activities on the Central Coast lakes. Attempts are being made to attract pro golf tournaments to Magenta Shores (a new resort north of The Entrance). In 2011, the frigate HMAS Adelaide was scuttled off North Avoca Beach as an artificial reef.

== Infrastructure ==
=== Health ===
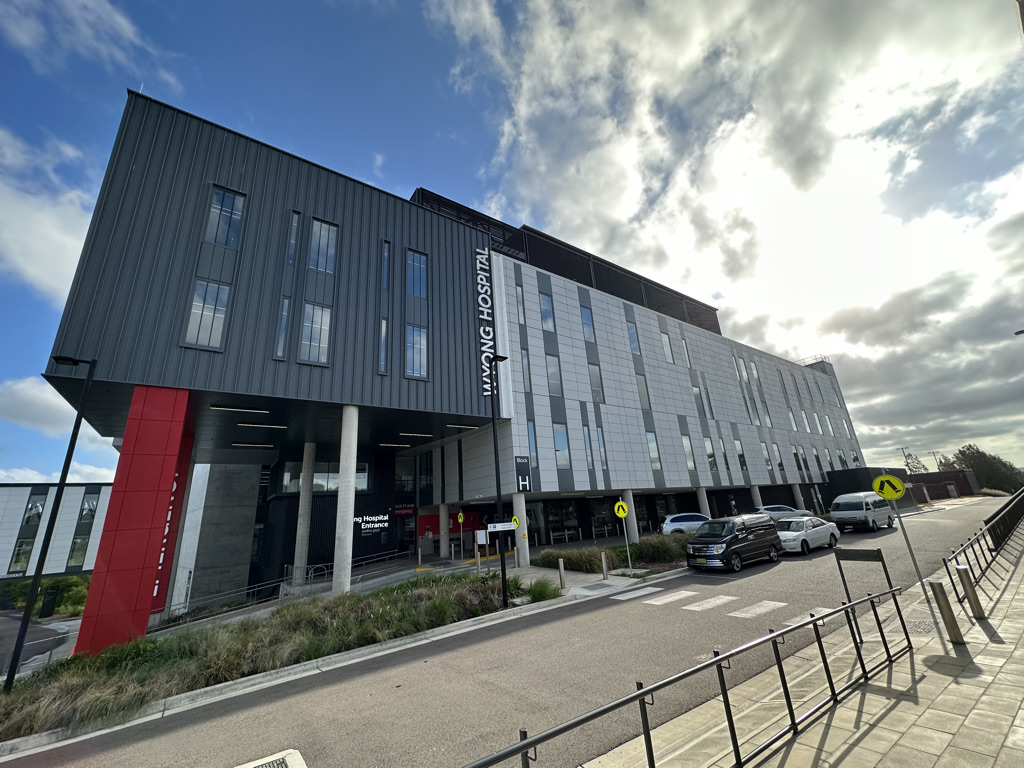
Emergency department at Wyong Hospital

The Central Coast has two large public hospitals with emergency departments. The Gosford Hospital is the largest hospital in the region that is located near the Gosford CBD with 460 beds. Wyong Hospital is the second largest hospital of the Central Coast which has 274 beds. It is located at Hamlyn Terrace which is approximately 8 km (5.0 mi) north of the Wyong town centre, along the Pacific Highway. Additionally, there is a small public hospital in Woy Woy and a Health Care Centre at Long Jetty. The largest private hospital on the Central Coast is Gosford Private Hospital located at North Gosford. Brisbane Waters Private in Woy Woy, Tuggerah Lakes Private at Kanwal and Berkeley Vale Private are also major healthcare providers. The region has 21 aged care facilities. New South Wales Ambulance has seven ambulance stations on the Central Coast located at Bateau Bay, Doyalson, Ettalong, Point Clare, Terrigal, Toukley and Wyong.

=== Telecommunications ===
The Central Coast falls in the fixed phone 43xx xxxx region and is classified Regional 1 for billing with the exception of northern suburbs Gwandalan and Summerland Point, which fall in the fixed phone region for Newcastle and Lower Hunter 49xx xxxx. Fixed-line telephone service is universally available. 3G, 4G and 5G mobile network services are available from Optus, Telstra and Vodafone, though numerous black spots exist due to the topography and remoteness of some parts of the region. Steps to improve coverage areas along the railway have been announced by the Federal Government.

ADSL and good quality fixed-wireless broadband services are widely available; however, significant blackspots continue to exist. High speed ADSL2 is available at most exchanges through Telstra. Few other providers exist, leading to an expensive high speed broadband offering for the region. Many areas experience very slow and/or unreliable ADSL connections due to the age and quality of the infrastructure.

Fibre optic based broadband services are available in some areas serviced by the National Broadband Network NBN. These include Kincumber, Gosford, East Gosford, West Gosford, Springfield, Berkeley Vale, Tumbi Umbi and Long Jetty.

In 2011, the region was selected as one of the early roll out regions for the National Broadband Network's fibre to the premise installation which will offer stable speeds of 100/40 Mbit/s down/up load respectively. Two Points Of Interconnect (POI) are located in the region at Gosford and Berkley Vale exchanges. The regional rollout will radiate out from these two super exchanges. Services in areas around the two POI are now available. The rollout of the NBN to the remainder of the region is in question following a change of government in September 2013. Trials of fibre to the node technology are planned for Umina Beach and Woy Woy.

== Governance ==
The Central Coast is administered by one local government area which is the Central Coast Council. It has an estimated population of 348,930 as of June 2022, growing by 1% annually. Politically, the Central Coast Council has administered the area since 12 May 2016, when the Gosford City Council and the Wyong Shire Council merged. In September 2006, the New South Wales government released a revised long-term plan for the region that saw the Central Coast classified as an urban area, along with Wollongong and the Hunter Region, but is not considered a metropolitan area. As of April 2015, Scot MacDonald served as the parliamentary secretary for the Hunter and Central Coast. In November 2015 both Gosford City and Wyong Shire councils controversially voted to merge following a NSW Independent Pricing and Regulatory Tribunal assessment which found the Gosford City and Wyong Shire Councils did not meet the stand-alone operating criteria for the NSW State government's "Fit for the Future" plans for the Local Area Councils within the state. Despite local opposition and concerns over Wyong Shire, in effect, being subsumed within the Gosford City Council, and claims of councillors being bullied into the merger, as part of the process, merging into a single Central Coast Council local government area passed all administrative and legislative requirements and came into effect in 2016. As of mid-2020, the amalgamation process had cost $49 million. The newly amalgamated Central Coast Council held elections in September 2017.

== Transport ==
The Central Coast is serviced by a road system. A combination of bus and rail provide limited public transport options for locals. The region also has taxis operated by Central Coast Taxis. Transport has been a constant issue for the region and has been cited as a high priority over the last 20 years in regional plans by local, state and federal government agencies, with incremental investments largely in road infrastructure.

=== Roads ===
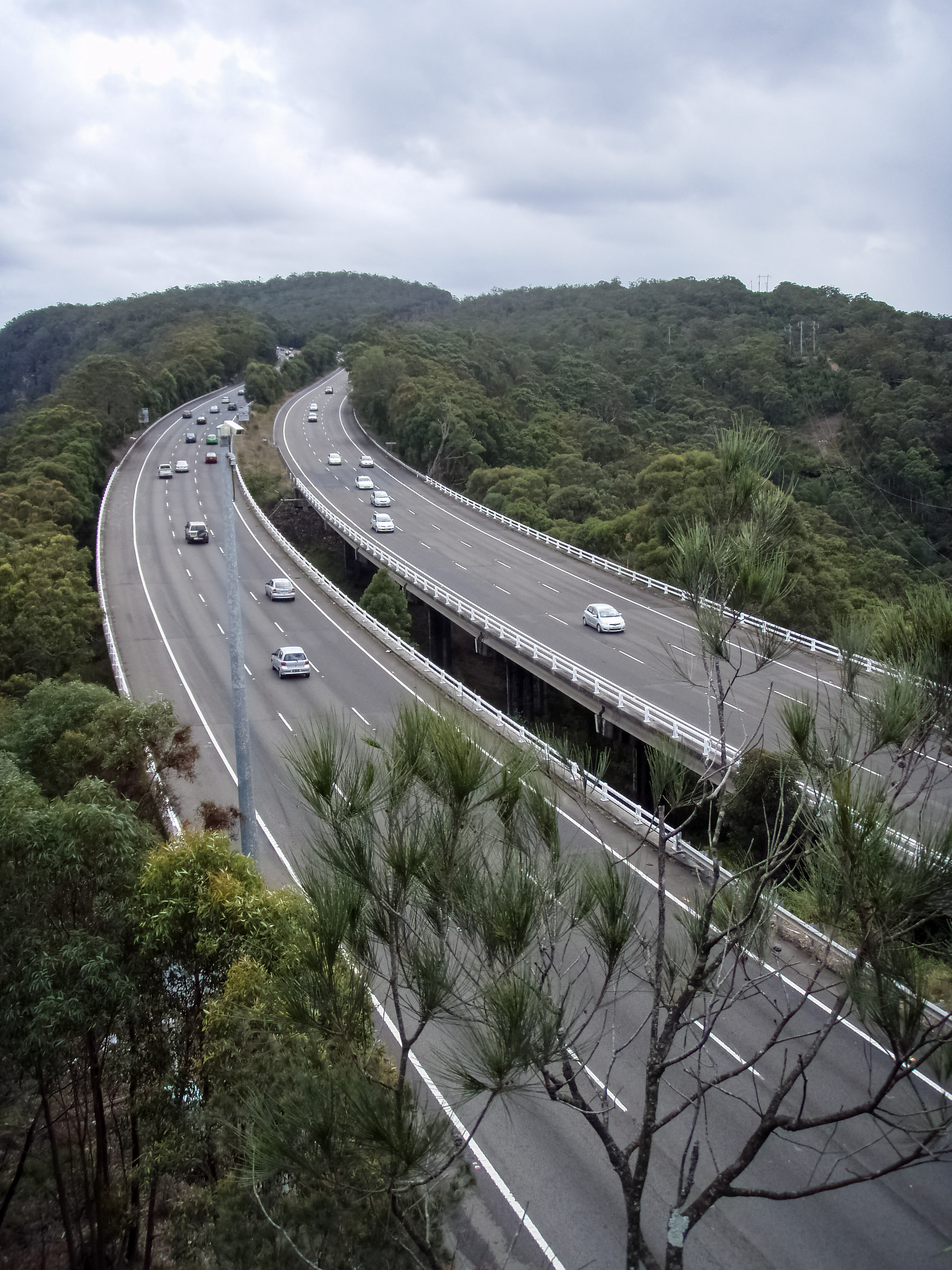
View of the Jolls Bridge facing north at Cheero Point on the Pacific Motorway

Pacific Motorway (Sydney–Newcastle Freeway)

The main access to the Central Coast by road is by the 127 kilometres (79 mi) Pacific Motorway that carries the designation National Highway 1. From January 2013 it officially has been renamed as the M1 Pacific Motorway. The freeway provides the most important road link between Sydney and the northern areas of New South Wales such as Central Coast, Hunter, Mid North Coast and Northern Rivers. The Pacific Motorway is part of the Sydney to Brisbane corridor. The Pacific Motorway is approximately 3 lanes wide from the southern end of the Central Coast to as far north as Doyalson. The section between the Tuggerah interchange and Doyalson interchange was widened to 3 lanes in each direction in 2020 and another section between the Kariong interchange and Peats Ridge interchange was also widened to 3 lanes in each direction in 2020.

Central Coast Highway

The roads that link Kariong with Doyalson (Pacific Highway, Dane Drive, Masons Parade, York Street, George Street, The Entrance Road, Oakland Avenue, Coral Street, Wilfred Barrett Drive, Budgewoi Road and Scenic Road) became known as the Central Coast Highway from 9 August 2006.

The Central Coast's roads are maintained by the Central Coast Council as well as state roads by the NSW government; however, due to the relatively large geography maintenance issues often arise.

=== Rail ===
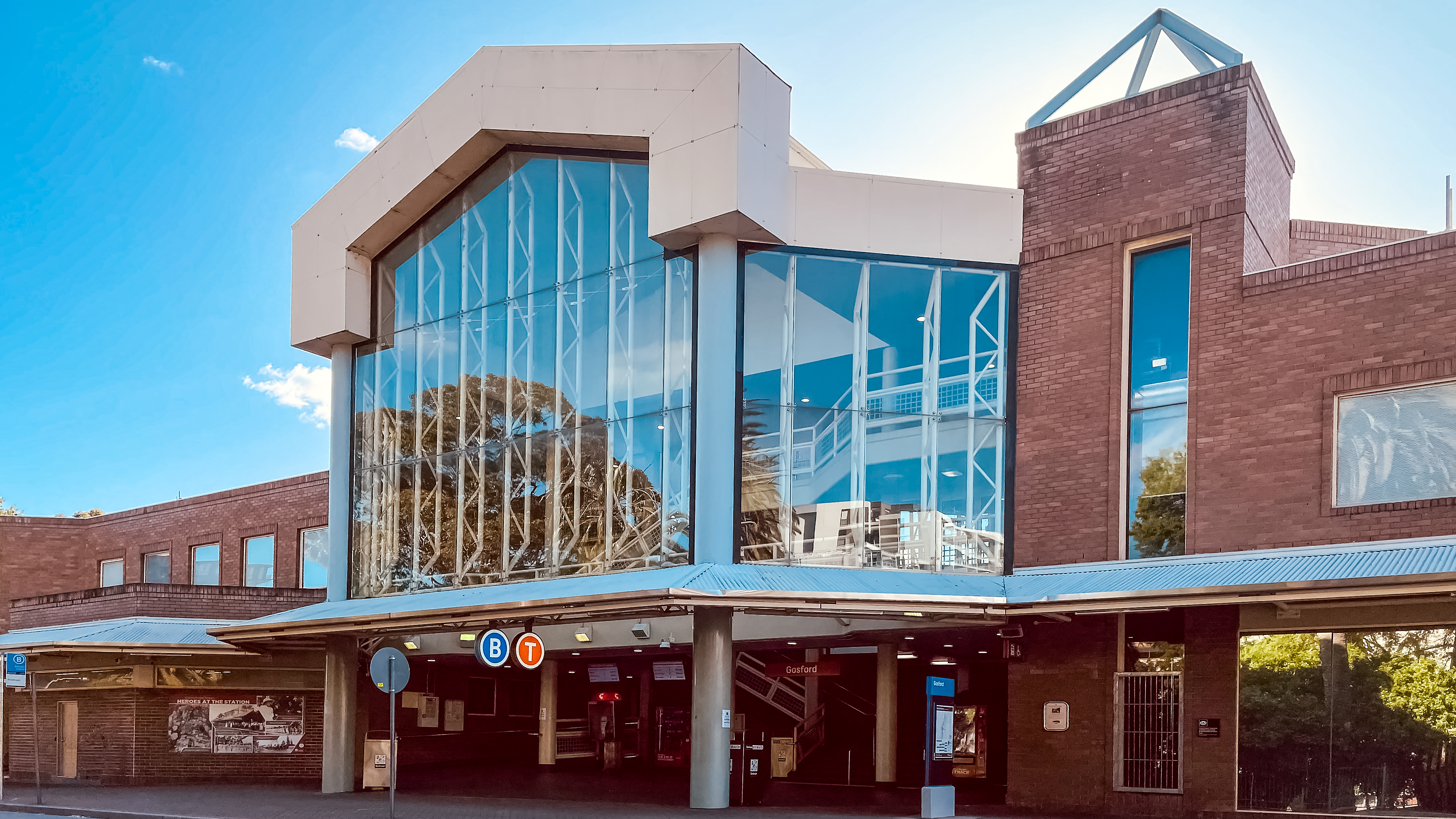
Main entrance of Gosford railway station

The western and south-eastern towns and suburbs of the Central Coast are on the Main Northern railway line. The rail line is primarily used to provide mass transport for those that commute to Sydney or Newcastle and as such services are most frequent during peak commuter times (typically one hour before Sydney and Newcastle peak times in the morning and one hour after in the evening due to the distance). Gosford station is the largest and main railway station in the region, which is considered a rest stop for long rail services to Sydney, Newcastle, Tamworth, Armidale, Taree, Port Macquarie, Coffs Harbour, Grafton, Casino, Gold Coast and Brisbane. The line has connections with most bus services as well as taxis. Trains terminate at both Gosford and Wyong stations which are also utilised by long-distance services.

Central Coast railway stations on the Northern NSW line are (from south to north):

North

- Wyee
- Warnervale
- Wyong
- Tuggerah
- Ourimbah
- Lisarow
- Niagara Park
- Narara
- Gosford
- Point Clare
- Tascott
- Koolewong
- Woy Woy
- Wondabyne

South

=== Bus ===
Bus services in the region are operated by Busways which has depots at Kincumber and Charmhaven, Red Bus CDC NSW and Coastal Liner. All companies serve their own individual areas covering almost all areas of the region and rarely overlapping.

Busways operates services using Lake Haven, Tuggerah, Erina Fair and Gosford as central points. In the south services cover as far south as Woy Woy, Umina, Ettalong and Pearl Beach/Patonga, and also stretch out to Kincumber, Erina, Avoca Beach and Terrigal in the east. Occasional services are conducted to Kariong, then to Mangrove Mountain in the west. Busways' northern services cover from Gosford and north to Tuggerah (through the Narara Valley and Ourimbah), then continue north to Wyong via Tuggerah, which in turn services the northern section of Lake Haven, Charmhaven, Gorokan, Toukley, Noraville, Budgewoi, Buff Point, San Remo, Blue Haven and Gwandalan. Further services also utilise routes which goes as far north as Swansea and Charlestown.

Red Bus Services operate services mainly between Wyong and The Entrance as well as The Entrance and Gosford, although some services do reach Ourimbah and Wyong Hospital at Hamlyn Terrace. Its services also operate to West Gosford, Wyoming, Holgate, Matcham, Point Frederick and Springfield. Although most services operate to/from Wyong Hospital via Berkeley Vale and Westfield Tuggerah, one service (Route 29) operates from Bay Village to Wyong Hospital via The Entrance, Magenta Shores, Toukley, Gorokan and Lake Haven. Red Bus have around 25 buses that are suitable for wheelchairs.

Coastal Liner operate limited route bus services around Westfield Tuggerah, Wyong, Hamlyn Terrace, Woongarrah, Warnervale, Dooralong and Jilliby. Routes 10 (Tuggerah-Wyee via Hue Hue Road and Wyong), 12 (Tuggerah-Jilliby via Dicksons and Mandalong Roads) and 13 (Tuggerah-Dooralong via Jilliby Road) all operate only on weekdays with limited services. Route 11 is the most popular service, linking Lake Haven with Warnervale via Hamlyn Terrace and Woongarah. This service on weekdays occasionally extends to Westfield Tuggerah and Wyong Station via Hue Hue Road.

CDC NSW operate services between Cheero Point, Mooney Mooney with the bus line extending to Sydney areas such as Brooklyn and sometimes as far as Hornsby. The bus route is isolated from rest of the Central Coast bus network.

=== Air ===
There are no airports in the region with residents using Sydney Airport and Newcastle Airport for domestic and international travel.

== Retail and commercial ==
The Central Coast is home to Erina Fair, the largest single level shopping mall in the Southern Hemisphere and the largest regional shopping mall in Australia. It provides many of the area's amenities such as restaurants, cinema, fast food and shopping. Another large shopping mall exists to the north, Westfield Tuggerah.

Other smaller local shopping malls are located throughout the region, including at Woy Woy, Umina Beach, Kincumber, Gosford, Wyoming, Bateau Bay, Wyong and Lake Haven.

== See also ==
- List of cities in Australia
- Regions of New South Wales
