= South Maitland coalfields =

Coal mining region in Australia

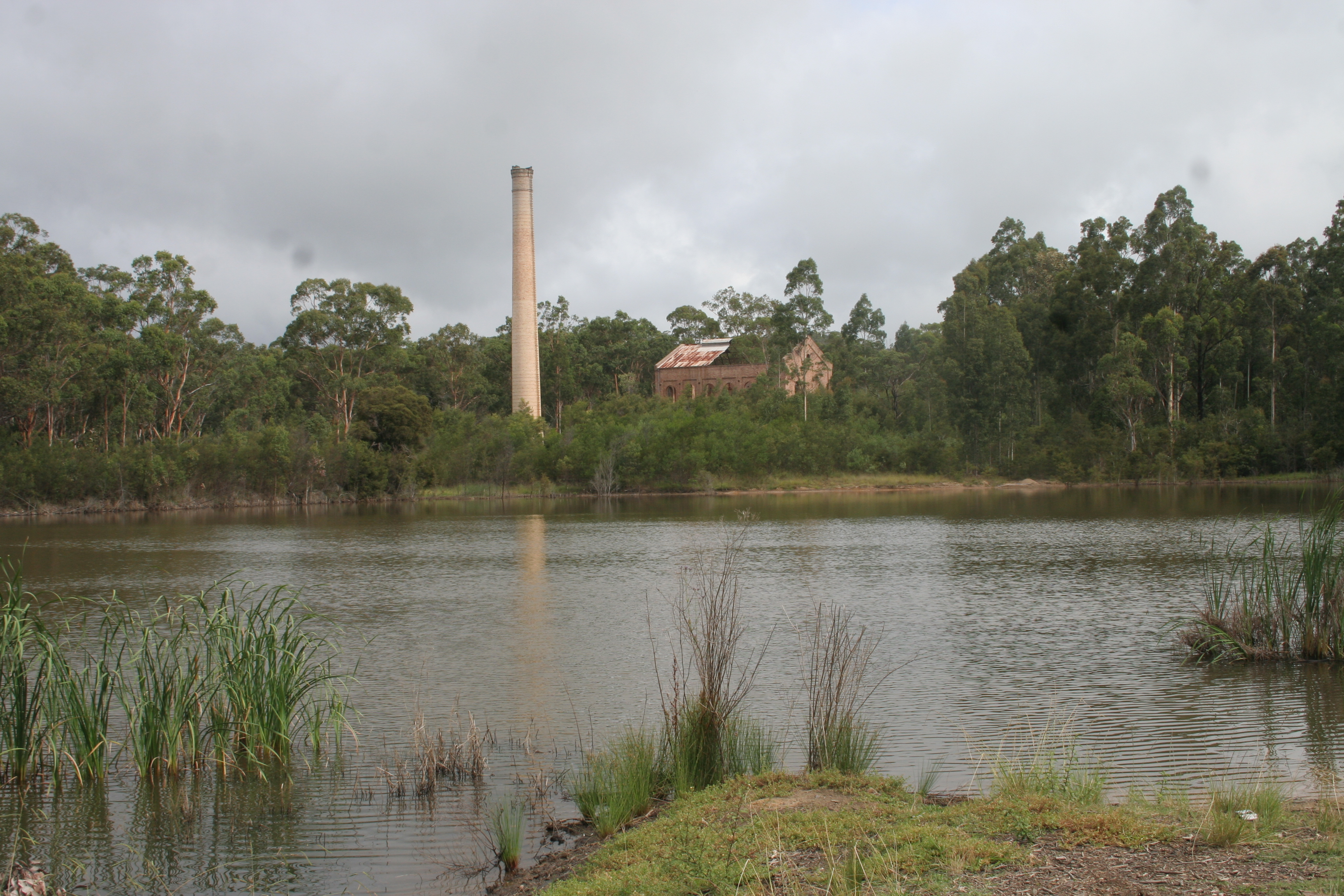
Remains of Aberdare South Colliery, near Abernethy

The South Maitland coalfields was the most extensive coalfield in New South Wales until the great coal mining slump of the 1960s.

== History ==
The area was discovered by Colonel William Paterson's party when they were engaged in an exploratory visit to the Hunter Valley during July 1801. Mention has been made that coal was being mined in the area during the 1840s, and about 1850 an outcrop in the vicinity of Mount Vincent was reported to the authorities. Several years later, Bourn Russell (1794–1880), also known as Captain Russell, commenced operations in a small way at Stoney Creek, Homeville, near Farley. The potential wealth of the coalfields was brought forward in 1886 by geologist Edgeworth David (1858–1934) who located an outcrop of first grade coal at Deep Creek, near the present township of Abermain. He was instrumental in having the whole coal-bearing area, estimated at 20,000 acres (8,100 ha), reserved for mining purposes.

The coalfields roughly commenced at the village of East Greta, about 3 miles (5 km) west of Maitland, and stretched all the way to the village of Paxton, 5 miles (8.0 km) south-west of Cessnock, covering numerous villages and towns, and employing tens of thousands of people in over 30 collieries.

Coal also brought population, as evidenced by 1904:

A great future is promised for the Maitland coal field. Capital is being invested ; new townships are building, Pelaw Main, Cessnock, Weston, Minmi, Greta, Stanford Merthyr, Kurri Kurri, Hebburn, Abermain, Aberdare are some of the centres. A year ago, Kurri Kurri was scrub ; it now has 1500 inhabitants, hotels costing £3,000 to £5,000, churches, a five-acres public school ground, school of arts, and other incidentals.

=== Railways ===
The coalfields were subsequently served by the South Maitland Railway which left the New South Wales Government Railways' Great Northern Railway above Maitland at the East Greta Junction, 20 miles 65 chains (33.49 km) north of Newcastle. This railway was in fact a considerable number of lines which all, at some point, merged, but had different original ownerships.

On 22 November 1918 the first meeting took place of the South Maitland Railways Proprietary Limited, a company incorporated with a capital of £500,000 (equivalent to A$56.7M in 2025) in £1 shares, and this company eventually acquired the entire coalfields railway network.

=== Companies ===
The two companies which came to dominate the district were Caledonian Collieries Limited, and J & A Brown & Abermain-Seaham Collieries Limited (a merger of three formerly separate companies). These two companies merged in 1960 forming Coal & Allied, that bought the Hebburn Company in July 1967.

Four mines were separately consolidated into the Southland Colliery, which was bought in 2004 by Yancoal and renamed as the Austar coal mine.

=== Employment ===
In 1937, for the main Northern (Greta area) collieries, experienced a number of non-productive days; out of 189 possible working days, Aberdare lost 49 (25.9%), Richmond Main, 20 (10.6%), and Bellbird, 36 (19.0%). Industrial disputes constituted 55% of the lost time, and slackness of trade, 32%.

For 1938, the average daily Maitland field wage for machinemen was ₤1/7/11 (about A$156 in 2025); shooters and fillers, ₤1/7/1 to ₤1/14/1 (A$151–$190); pick miners, ₤1/17/1 to ₤2/10/4 (A$207–$281); contract wheelers, ₤1/5/3 to ₤1/15/11 (A$141–$200).

In 1938, accountants for Caledonian Collieries Limited stated the continuing increase in railway freight fees was a big impact on company finances; The colliery had not paid a shareholder dividend since 1929, nor had paid income taxes for some years.

In late 1955, British and US oil monopolies saw a significant impact on the coal industry and employment.

== List of collieries and proprietors ==
This is an incomplete summary table. Coal mines may change names over time. Details of mine life may be described in the town article. Dates presented may be approximate (subject to coal discovery, test bores, company registration).

'Greta' in a colliery name is more likely to refer the Greta coal measures, and not the Greta township.

Most uncited information below likely sourced from Eardley (1969).

| Colliery | Closest town | First opened | Company | Closed | Type | Notes | Ref |
|---|---|---|---|---|---|---|---|
| Aberdare | Aberdare | 1905 | Aberdare Collieries Co. Ltd; then Caledonian Collieries Ltd | 1960 | Underground; open cut (from 1946) | | |
| Aberdare Central | Kitchener | 1917 | Caledonian Collieries Ltd | 1960~ | | | |
| Aberdare East | Cessnock (south) | | | | | In operation in 1967, during developmental work. | |
| Aberdare Extended | Cessnock | 1906 | Caledonian Collieries Ltd | 1963 | | | |
| Aberdare North | Cessnock (north-east) | | | | | In operation in 1966. | |
| Aberdare South (or Abernethy Main) | | 1913 | Caledonian Collieries Ltd | 1940 | | Formerly Shedden's colliery. | |
| Aberdare West | Cessnock (north-east) | | | | | In operation in 1966. | |
| Aberdare No. 7 | Cessnock | <1942 | | | | Fire c. 1942. In operation in 1966. | |
| Abermain No. 1 | Abermain | 1903 | Abermain Collieries Ltd (1960) | 1960 | Underground | | (Note: See article link in Colliery cell.) |
| Abermain No. 2 | Kearsley | 1912 | Abermain Collieries Ltd | 1964 | Underground | first mechanised pit in the area 1912 | |
| Abermain No. 3 | Neath | 1923 | Abermain & Seaham Collieries Ltd | 1960 | Underground | | |
| Austar (formerly Southland Colliery) | Paxton–Pelton | 2004 | Yancoal | >2021 | Underground | Southland Collieries renamed as Austar when Yancoal took over. | |
| Ayrfield No. 1 | Heddon Greta | 1918 | Ayrfield Collieries Ltd (RW Miller and Co. Ltd) | 1933 | Underground | Fire. Adjoins Heddon Greta colliery. | |
| Ayrfield No. 2 | Heddon Greta | 1924 | Ayrfield Collieries Ltd (RW Miller and Co. Ltd) | 1930 | | Flooded | |
| Ayrfield No. 3 | North Rothbury | <1936 | RW Miller and Co. Ltd | | | Fire in 1949 and later tunnel No. 2 abandoned. Active in 1966. (GPS c. 32.677381°S 151.340569°E) | |
| Bellbird | Bellbird | 1908 | Hetton Coal Mining Co. | | Underground | 1923 disaster (21 dead). By 1945, Nos 1, 2, and 3. Still in operation in 1966, including open cut from 15 May 1967. | |
| Bellbird South (then 2004, Austar) | Bellbird | <1921 | (2004, Yancoal) | >1952 | Underground; open cut | | |
| Caledon | Cessnock (north-east) | | | | Open cut. | In operation in 1966. (GPS c. 32.677381°S 151.340569°E) | |
| Cessnock No. 1 (Kalingo Colliery) (then 2004, Austar) | Ellalong | 1914 | Great Northern Company, 1922; 1927, Wickham & Bullock Island Coal Mining Co.; 1933 Cessnock Collieries Ltd; 2004 | 1964 | | Amalgamated with Pelton in 1961. Taken over in 2004 by Yancoal. | |
| Cessnock No. 2 | | 1917 | Wickham & Bullock Island Coal Mining Co.; 1933, Cessnock Collieries Ltd | 1955 | Underground | Underground fire in 1946. | |
| East Greta No. 1 | | 1890 | East Great Coal Mining Co. | 1929 (24 Sep) | | Flooding 1930. | |
| East Greta No. 2 | | 1896 | East Great Coal Mining Co. | 1929 (24 Sep) | | | |
| Ellalong (then 2004, Austar) | Ellalong | >1908 | (2004, Yancoal) | | Underground | | |
| Glen Ayr | | 1914 | Glen Ayr Colliery Co. | 1930 | | Flooded | |
| Glen Greta | Kurri Kurri/Heddon Greta | 1930 | | 1930 | | | |
| Greta Main (Note: List of mines from previous wiki article shows a 'Greta Main' at Weston, but 1966 map shows a 'Greta Main' at the locality of Greta Main, between Millfield and Pelton, north of Paxton, with postcode 2325. There may have been two Greta Main mines. The location and owner of this one to be reviewed. Need access to Eardley's 1969 works.) | Weston | 1922 | E S & B Jefferies | 1935 | | Flooded. | |
| Greta Main (then 1929, Maitland Main) | Greta Main (near Paxton) | 1921 | Greta Main Colliery | | | Still in operation in 1966. (GPS c. 32.88646°S 151.278298°E) | |
| Hebburn No. 1 | Weston | 1903 | Australian Agricultural Co.; then Hebburn Coal Co. | 1958 | | | |
| Hebburn No. 2 | Weston | 1918 | Hebburn Coal Co.; 1967, J & A Brown | | | Still in operation in 1966. | |
| Hebburn No. 3 (or Elrington) | Abernethy | 1924 | Hebburn Coal Co.; later BHP Co. Ltd | 1962 | | | |
| Heddon Greta | Heddon Greta | 1890 | Heddon Greta Coalmining Company | 1912 | | Closed after a fire and then flooding. Adjoins Ayrfield colliery. | |
| Hill End | Cessnock | | Hill End Colliery Company | 1913 | Underground | Underground seam fire (August 1930–?1949) | |
| Jeffries | Abermain | 1932 | | | Small operation | | |
| Millfield Greta | Millfield | 1924 | Millfield-Greta Coal Mining Co.; later RW Miller | | | | |
| Neath | Neath | 1906 | Wickham & Bullock Island Coal Mining Co.; 1933, Cessnock Collieries Ltd | 1961 | | | |
| Pelaw Main (formerly Stanford Greta to 1901) | Pelaw Main south of Kurri Kurri | 1901 (Dec) | Richmond Vale Coal Company, then J & A Brown | 1960s | Underground | | |
| Pelton (then 2004, Austar) | Pelton | 1916 | Newcastle-Wallsend Coal Co. | 1998 | Underground | Amalgamated with Cessnock No. 1 (Kalingo) in 1961. Taken over in 2004 by Yancoal. | |
| Richmond Main (formerly Richmond Vale to 1911) | Kurri Kurri | 1890 | Richmond Vale Coal Company, John Scholey syndicate; later J & A Brown | 1967 | Underground | Highest daily production in New South Wales. Colliery now heritage listed, and managed by the Richmond Vale Railway Museum. | |
| Silkstone | | 1890 | | | | | |
| Stanford Main No. 2 (also Stanford Merthyr No. 2, also Paxton) | Paxton | 1922 | East Greta Coal Mining Co; 1934, J & A Brown etc. | 1961 | Underground | Most southerly of the South Maitland coalfields' mines. | |
| Stanford Merthyr No. 1 (then Stanford Main No. 1) | Stanford Merthyr, near Kurri Kurri | 1901 | East Greta Coal Mining Co.; later J & A Brown etc. | 1960s | Underground | Major mine. 1905 disaster (6 dead, 7 injured). | |
