= South Maitland Railway =

Former railway in New South Wales, Australia

The South Maitland Railway was an extensive network of privately owned colliery and passenger railway lines which served the South Maitland coalfields in the Hunter Region of New South Wales, Australia and were the second last system in Australia to use steam haulage, having used steam locomotives until 1983.

The last section was mothballed in March 2020 after operations at the Austar coal mine in Pelton were suspended. On 2 March 2022, remaining assets were sold to Aurizon; these included the sidings at East Greta and the remaining line from East Greta Junction to the former site of Bellbird Junction.

== Aboriginal heritage ==
The location of the South Maitland railway corridor was a songline and travel route for the original inhabitants.

== Lines worked by the SMR ==
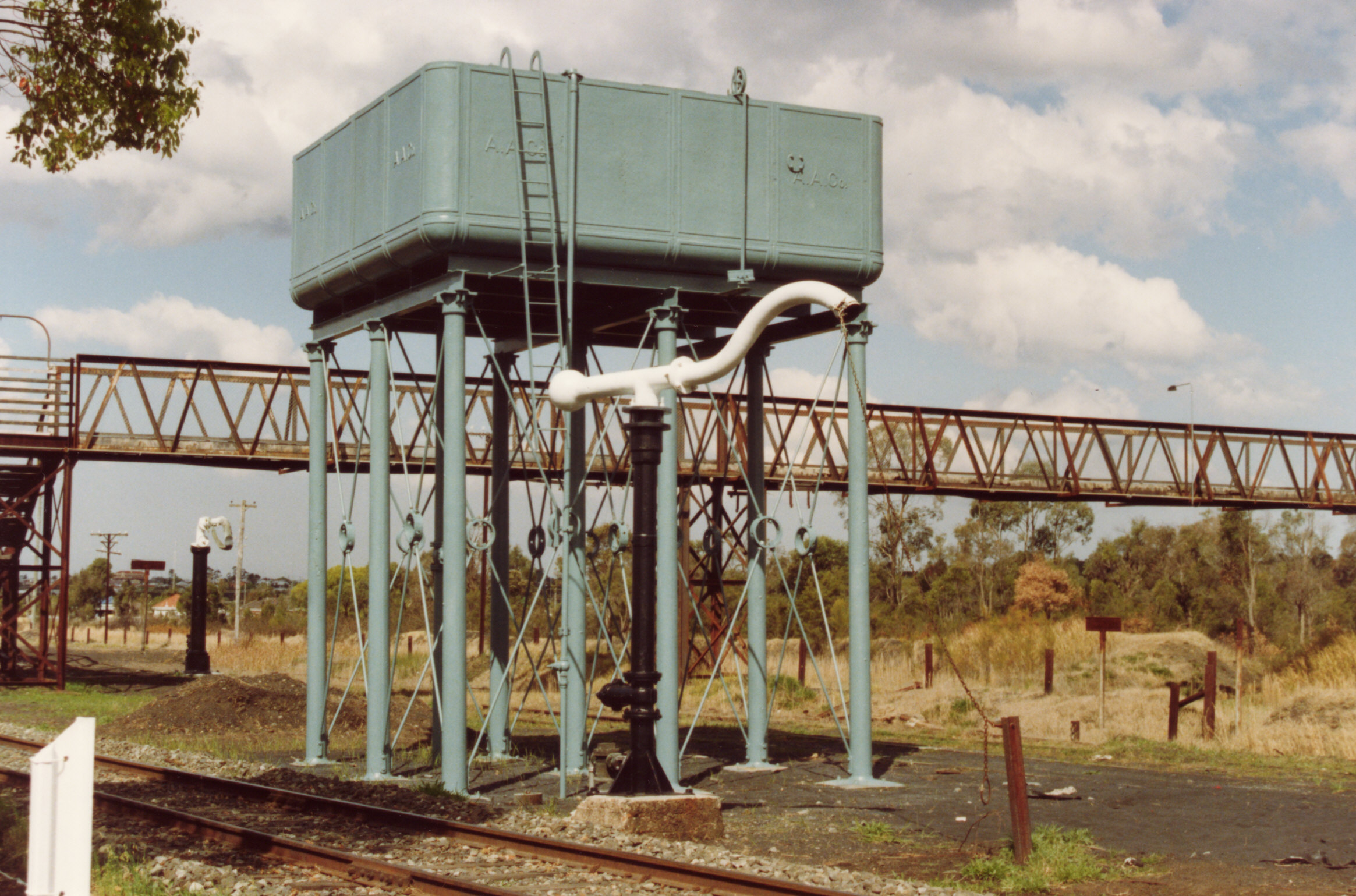
Weston water tank, note AA Co. cast into end panels

The first section of the line was opened to East Greta in 1893. This line was built by the East Greta Coal Mining Company to service their East Greta Colliery. This colliery was joined in 1896 by the East Greta No. 2 Colliery which was located towards Maitland.

In 1901, the railway line was extended from East Greta to Stanford Merthyr Colliery which was also owned by the East Greta Company. This line initially also served Pelaw Main Colliery (owned by J & A Brown) & Heddon Greta Colliery. Haulage from Pelaw Main only lasted a short period as, after the 1905 opening of the nearby J & A Brown owned Richmond Vale Railway, the coal from this colliery was hauled over the RVR line to Hexham. Several small collieries were later opened along the Stanford Merthyr branch.

In 1901, the Australian Agricultural Company and the Aberdare Collieries of NSW Ltd commenced construction of the Aberdare Railway to Cessnock, this line branched off the Stanford Merthyr line at a point that was named Aberdare Junction. This line was opened in stages, the section to Weston being opened on 29 December 1902, with the final section to Cessnock being completed in February 1904.

A passenger service ran over this line terminating at Cessnock station. Several collieries were soon opened adjoining this line, being Hebburn Colliery (later Hebburn No. 1) at Weston by the AA Co. in 1901, Abermain Colliery (later Abermain No. 1) at Abermain by the Abermain Coal Co. in 1903, Neath Colliery at Neath by the Wickham & Bullock Island Coal Co in 1906 and Aberdare Colliery at Caledonia by Caledonian Collieries Ltd in 1905.

With the expansion of traffic the single track main line was duplicated in sections, the first being from East Greta Junction to East Greta in August 1903, followed by East Greta to Aberdare Junction in September 1906. Duplication to Cessnock was completed in February 1912. The Stanford Merthyr branch from Aberdare Junction to Standford Merthyr remained single track.

In 1906, an end-on junction was made at Cessnock station for a short branch to Aberdare Extended Colliery. In 1911, a branch line was constructed off the Aberdare Railway main line at Bellbird Junction (near Cessnock) to Bellbird Colliery by the Hetton Coal Co, which entered into an agreement with the East Greta Co for coal haulage. In 1916, this branch was extended to Pelton Colliery which was being developed by the Newcastle Wallsend Coal Co. In 1913, Caledonian Collieries constructed a branch line off the Aberdare railway main line to Aberdare South Colliery, and this was followed in 1914 by a separate branch to Aberdare Central Colliery.

In 1917, a second branch line was constructed from Bellbird Junction by the Wickham & Bullock Island Coal Co to their new Cessnock Colliery (later Cessnock No. 2). In the 1920s, they extended this line to Kalingo Colliery (later Cessnock No. 1). Several branch lines were built off the Kalingo extension to service collieries owned by other companies.

== Lines worked by the coal companies ==
In 1912, the Abermain Coal Co. constructed a branch line to Abermain No. 2 Colliery at Kearsley. This branch line and the existing Abermain No. 1 Colliery sidings were then worked by the Abermain Co. using their own locomotives to the exchange sidings at Abermain where the East Greta Co. (& later SMR) would then work the trains to and from East Greta Junction. In 1923, Abermain Seaham Collieries Ltd opened Abermain No. 3 Colliery on this branch.

When opened by the AA Co., Hebburn No. 1 Colliery was worked by locomotives owned by the AA Co. which shunted the trains to and from a set of exchange sidings that were adjacent to Weston station. In 1918, the Hebburn Limited (the successors to the AA Co.) constructed a branch line from the exchange sidings to Hebburn No. 2 Colliery, and this line was also worked by Hebburn Ltd using their own locomotives. In 1924, the Hebburn branch was further extended to Elrington Colliery which was jointly owned by Hebburn Ltd and BHP. This extension was also worked by the Hebburn locomotives to the exchange sidings at Weston.

== Passenger services ==
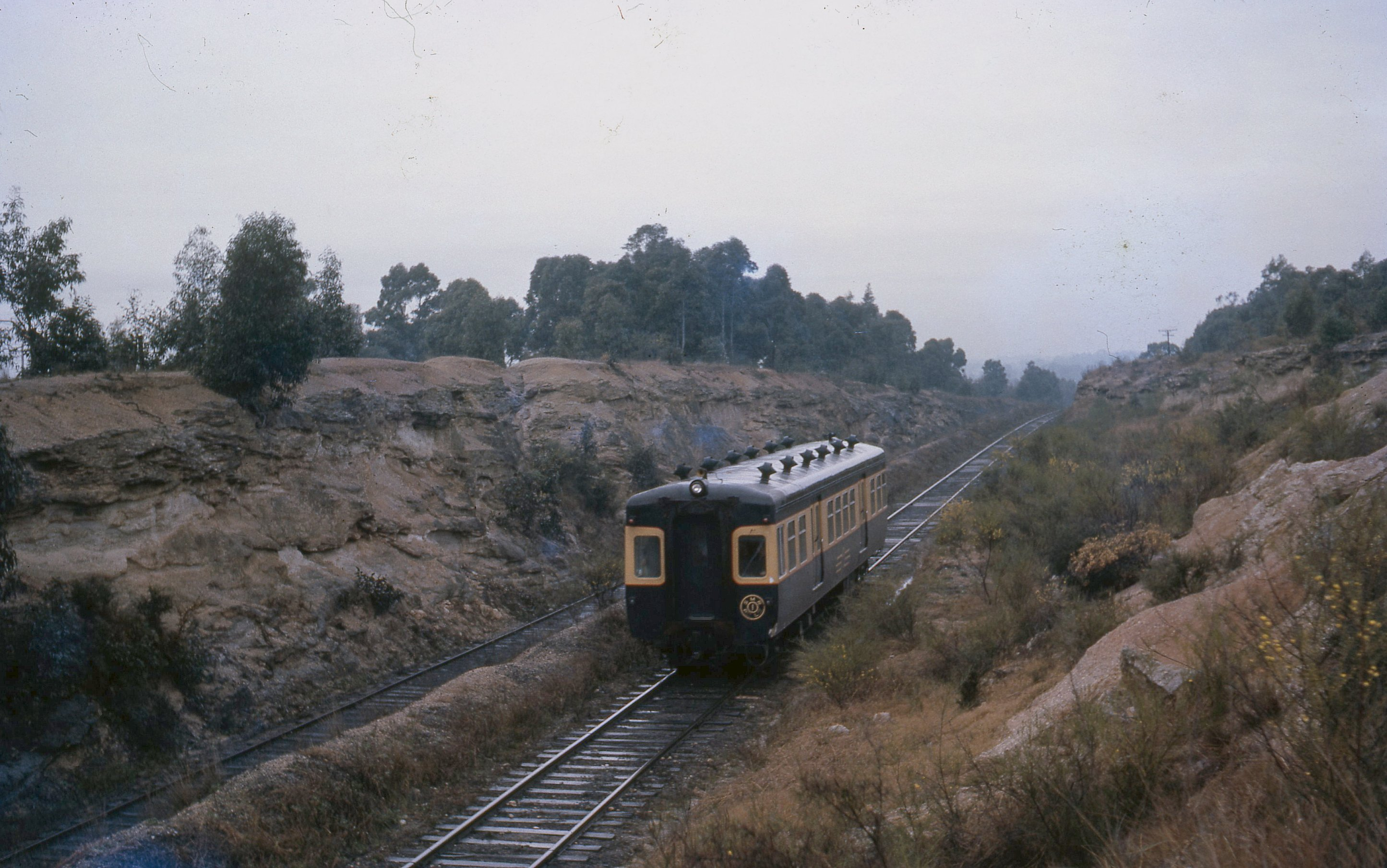
South Maitland Railway railcar No. 1 travelling between Weston and Abermain in July 1962

In June 1902, a passenger service commenced between East Greta Junction and Stanford Merthyr. Intermediate stations were at East Greta and Heddon Greta, and, with the construction of the Aberdare Railway to Cessnock, a station named Aberdare Junction was opened at the junction of the Aberdare & Stanford Railways. Stations were also initially opened at Weston, Abermain, Caledonia and Cessnock, with further stations latter opening at B Siding, North Kurri Kurri and Neath. Passengers had to make their own way between East Greta Junction and West Maitland stations and this was the source of many complaints. During 1903, the service was extended to West Maitland. The connection to the government passenger service was further improved in 1905 when a platform was constructed at West Maitland for the use of East Greta trains.

These trains were operated by the East Greta Coal Mining Co, initially using a number of second hand ex New South Wales Government Railways (NSWGR) 4 and 6 wheel passenger carriages. In the following years, additional similar carriages were obtained with the total of these ex NSWGR railway carriages reaching 20. From 1908 to 1925, 16 new bogie end platform carriages similar to the carriages running on the NSWGR were also obtained. A carriage shed was constructed at East Greta Junction to house the passenger carriages when not in use. With the opening of the line to Cessnock, passenger services were also operated from Cessnock to Maitland. Stations on this line were located at Aberdare Junction, Bee Siding, North Kurri Kurri, Weston, Abermain, Neath, Caledonia and Cessnock.

Between 1929 and 1930, a lengthy industrial dispute known as the 'lockout' occurred which effectively shut all of the collieries on the South Maitland Coalfield. The railway was soon involved in this dispute with both coal and passenger services being stopped during the dispute. During the dispute, the majority of SMR's passenger carriages were destroyed on 1 March 1930 when the carriage shed at East Greta Junction was burnt down. Negotiations were then entered into with the Department of Railways, New South Wales, for the government railways to take over the passenger service, which occurred on 13 April 1930. In February 1940, a direct Sydney to Cessnock express service was introduced.

The NSWGR operated services lasted until 1961 when SMR took over the majority of the services when they introduced three railcars built by Tulloch Limited. The services run by SMR lasted until 1967, when the SMR railcar services were withdrawn, with only the few through services run by the NSWGR to and from Broadmeadow remaining. These ceased in May 1972 when all passenger services ended.

== Locomotives ==
=== East Greta Coal Mining Co / South Maitland Railways ===
Locomotive	Type	Builder	Builder's No.	Built	Entered service	Withdrawn	Notes
1	4-4-0T	Manning Wardle	39	1862	1895	1911	ex New South Wales Government Railways 6N – scrapped 1911
1 (2nd)	0-8-2T	Avonside Engine Company	1596	1911	1911	1937	Sold 1937 Bulli Colliery
2	0-4-0ST	Avonside Engine Company	1415	1900	1901	1934	Sold J & A Brown – Preserved Dorrigo Steam Railway & Museum
3	0-6-0ST	Avonside Engine Company	1436	1902	1902	1928	Sold Sydney and Suburban Metal Co
4	0-6-0	Kitson & Company	2118	1877	1902	1922	-
5	0-6-0	Kitson & Company	2299	1879	1903	1918	New England – Scrapped 1927
6	0-8-0ST	Avonside Engine Company	1464	1903	1904	1930	Sold 1930
7	0-6-0	Kitson & Company	2029	1879	1904	1922	Murrumbidgee – Scrapped 1927
8	0-6-0ST	Avonside Engine Company	1487	1904	1905	1928	Sold Gunnedah Colliery
9	0-8-0ST	Avonside Engine Company	1481	1904	1905	1935	Sold Mount Kembla Coal Co
10	0-6-0	Vale & Lacy, Sydney	10	1873	1906	1911	ex New South Wales Government Railways 21N
10 (2nd)	2-8-2T	Beyer, Peacock & Company	5520	1911	1912	Jan 1987	Preserved Hunter Valley Training Company
11	4-4-2T	Beyer, Peacock & Company	1629	1877	1907	1935	ex New South Wales Government Railways CC class No. 84 – scrapped 1935
12	4-4-2T	Beyer, Peacock & Company	1628	1877	1907	1935	ex New South Wales Government Railways CC class No. 83 – scrapped 1935
13	0-8-2T	Avonside Engine Company	1541	1908	1908	1930	Sold BHP Newcastle 1944
14	0-8-2T	Avonside Engine Company	1559	1909	1909	1930	Sold Hetton Bellbird Coal Co. 1936 – Preserved Dorrigo Steam Railway & Museum
15	4-6-4T	Beyer, Peacock & Company	5603	1912	1912	1965	Scrapped October 1973
16	4-6-4T	Beyer, Peacock & Company	5638	1912	1912	1946	Scrapped October 1973
17	2-8-2T	Beyer, Peacock & Company	5790	1914	1914	Dec 1983	Preserved Hunter Valley Railway Trust
18	2-8-2T	Beyer, Peacock & Company	5909	1915	1915	Dec 1984	Preserved Hunter Valley Training Company
19	2-8-2T	Beyer, Peacock & Company	5910	1915	1915	Nov 1981	Preserved Richmond Vale Railway Museum
20	2-8-2T	Beyer, Peacock & Company	5998	1920	1920	Feb 1985	Preserved Hunter Valley Railway Trust
21	4-4-2T	Beyer, Peacock & Company	3335	1891	1919	1935	ex New South Wales Government Railways M51 – Sold NSW Public Works Department 1940
22	2-8-2T	Beyer, Peacock & Company	6055	1921	1921	Sep 1987	Preserved Richmond Vale Railway Museum
23	2-8-2T	Beyer, Peacock & Company	6056	1921	1921	Jul 1980	Preserved Hunter Valley Railway Trust
24	2-8-2T	Beyer, Peacock & Company	6125	1922	1922	Sep 1987	Preserved Richmond Vale Railway Museum
25	2-8-2T	Beyer, Peacock & Company	6126	1923	1923	Sep 1987	Preserved Richmond Vale Railway Museum
26	2-8-2T	Beyer, Peacock & Company	6127	1923	1923	Jul 1983	Preserved Hunter Valley Railway Trust
27	2-8-2T	Beyer, Peacock & Company	6137	1923	1923	Mar 1987	Preserved Hunter Valley Railway Trust
28	2-8-2T	Beyer, Peacock & Company	6138	1923	1923	Dec 1983	Preserved Hunter Valley Railway Trust
29	4-6-4T	Beyer, Peacock & Company	6139	1923	1923	1965	Scrapped October 1973
30	2-8-2T	Beyer, Peacock & Company	6294	1926	1926	Sep 1987	Preserved Richmond Vale Railway Museum
31	2-8-2T	Beyer, Peacock & Company	5295	1926	1926	Jun 1984	Preserved Hunter Valley Railway Trust

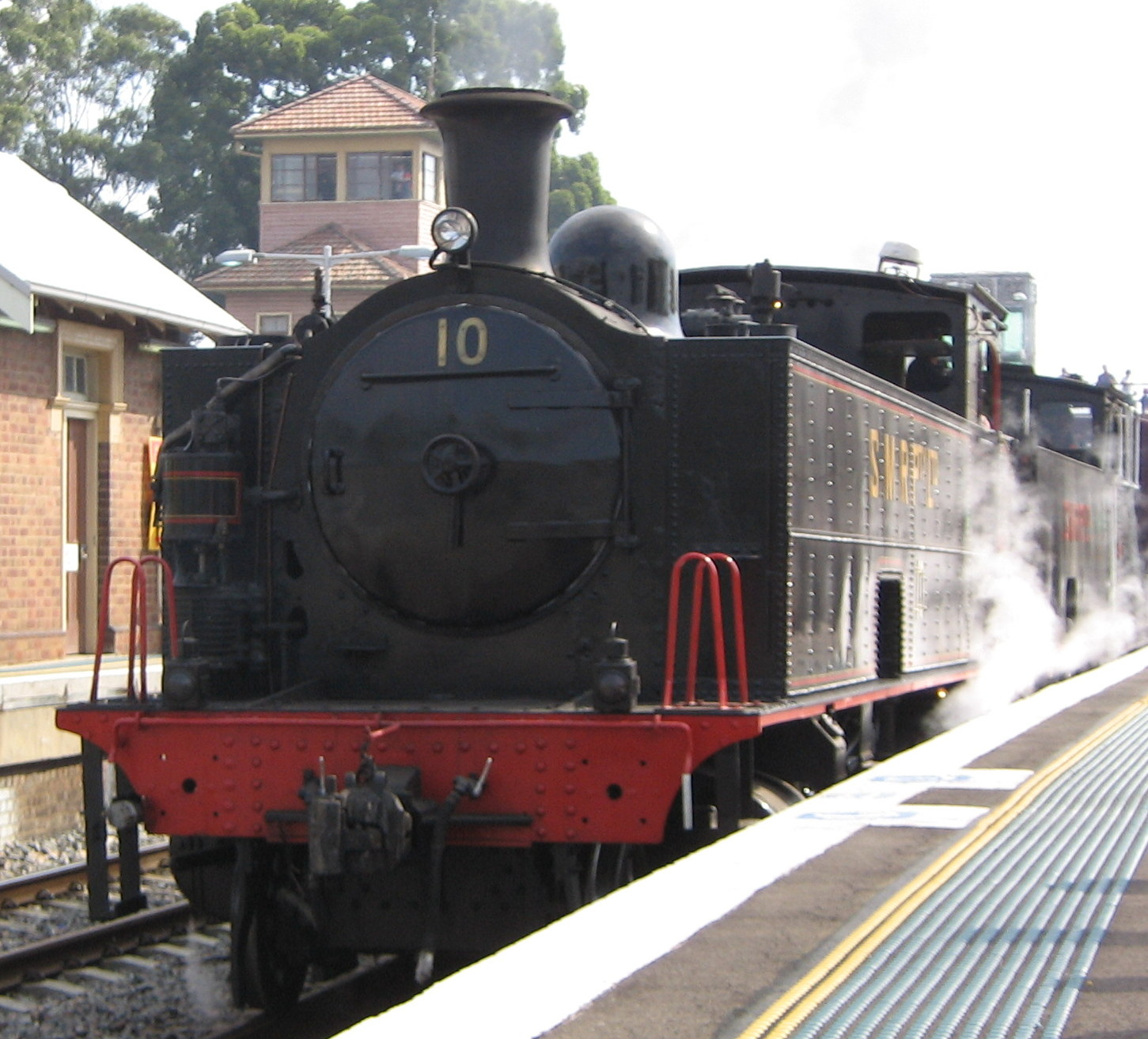
SMR 10 at Maitland during Hunter Valley Steamfest in 2006

Upon the formation of South Maitland Railways in 1918 the new company took over the existing locomotive fleet of the East Greta Coal Mining Co. In 1935, with the withdrawal of all the other classes except the three passenger locomotives, the fourteen 2-8-2T wheel arrangement 10 Class became the main motive power, assisted on the shorter runs by the three ex passenger locos (15,16 & 29).

Beyer, Peacock & Company, Manchester, built the fourteen 10 class locomotives to a design specifically for the East Greta Coal Mining Co/SMR. After the withdrawal of the last passenger tank loco in 1965, the 10 class locos then solely worked the coal traffic both on the SMR and from March 1973 they also worked the Richmond Vale Railway until its closure in September 1987. The four locomotives working the Richmond Vale Railway upon closure were the last four steam locomotives in normal commercial operation in Australia. After the end of steam on the SMR all fourteen were placed under a preservation order. The leader, SMR 10, was the most recent to be restored to working operation, and it is currently located along with No. 18 at the Hunter Valley Training Company which is based in the former South Maitland Railway workshops at East Greta Junction. SMR 17, 20, 23, 26, 27, 28 and 31 are stored at the Hunter Valley Railway Trust. The locomotives at Rothbury have been since sold to the Dorrigo Steam Railway & Museum and approval for this was obtained from the NSW Heritage Council for the relocation of these engines. Nos.19, 22, 24, 25 and 30 are located at the Richmond Vale Railway Museum at Richmond Main.

Upon steam working finishing on the SMR in June 1983, operation of the coal trains was taken over by the State Rail Authority with 47 and 48 class locomotives. Following track strengthening Pacific National began operating EL class locomotives on the line in January 2011.

=== Abermain line ===
Locomotive	Type	Builder	Builder's No.	Built	Entered service	Withdrawn	Notes
1	0-6-0ST	Avonside Engine Company	1606	1911	1911	1961	Transferred to Richmond Vale Railway Hexham 1955 – scrapped 1966
2	0-6-0ST	Avonside Engine Company	1916	1922	1922	1969	Transferred to Richmond Vale Railway Hexham 1963 – Preserved Dorrigo Steam Railway & Museum
1 Saywell	0-6-0T	Hudswell Clarke	290	1886	1920	1925	Sold 1925 Howley & Co. Glenrock Railway

The three locomotives purchased by the Abermain Coal Company are shown above. In 1922 the Abermain Coal Co. merged with the Seaham Coal Co. to form Abermain Seaham Collieries Ltd. In 1931 Abermain Seaham Collieries merged with J & A Brown to form J & A Brown & Abermain Seaham Collieries Ltd (JABAS). The two Avonside locos kept their Abermain numbers but were transferred to Hexham when requiring major repairs.

J & A Brown No. 5 also worked the Abermain line on loan from the Richmond Vale Railway from October 1936 to September 1939.

=== Hebburn line ===
Locomotive	Type	Builder	Builder's No.	Built	Entered service	Withdrawn	Notes
2	0-6-0ST	Beyer, Peacock & Company	2575	1884	1884	1938	Transferred from AA Co's Newcastle system 1903 – scrapped 1947
3	0-6-0ST	Beyer, Peacock & Company	4558	1903	1903	1920	Transferred from AA Co's Newcastle system 1918 – sold 1920 Hoskin's Ironworks, Lithgow
62xx	0-6-0	Robert Stephenson & Company	2195	1874	1903	1927	ex New South Wales Government Railways 62xx – ex Newcastle Coal Mining Co.
2020	2-6-4T	Beyer, Peacock & Company	3206	1891	1934	1955	ex New South Wales Government Railways 2020
2017	2-6-4T	Beyer, Peacock & Company	3289	1891	1939	1956	ex New South Wales Government Railways 2017
1	2-6-2T	Robert Stephenson & Hawthorns	E7841	1955	1955	1967	Scrapped 1970
J & A Brown 26	2-6-4T	Beyer, Peacock & Company	2567	1885	1967	1967	ex New South Wales Government Railways 2013 – Scrapped 1970
3013	4-6-4T	Beyer, Peacock & Company	4456	1903	1967	1976	ex New South Wales Government Railways 3013, On hire from the RVR – Transferred to Hexham 1972 – Preserved by private owner Lachlan Valley Railway 1981–2009, preserved by Canberra Railway Museum 2009–2017, preserved by NSWPR of South Maitland 2017–present

Locomotives 1, 2, 3, 62xx, 2017 & 2020 were Hebburn Ltd locomotives and worked the branch lines to Hebburn Nos.1 & 2 Collieries & Elrington Colliery. 62xx, 2 & 3 were transferred from the AA Co's Newcastle railway system. 62xx was also used on Aberdare Railway construction trains. When loco No. 1 failed in 1967 and since Hebburn Ltd was now part of Coal & Allied, J & A Brown No. 26 was placed on loan to Hebburn. No. 26 soon developed problems and was replaced by J & A Brown 3013, which although despite being bought for the Richmond Vale Railway was transferred to Hebburn upon purchase from the Department of Railways. Upon closure of Hebburn No. 2 Colliery in 1972, 3013 was transferred to the RVR at Hexham where it was used until 1976. J & A Brown No. 26 never returned to the RVR & was cut up at Hebburn No. 1 Colliery in 1970.

=== Wickham & Bullock Island/ Cessnock Collieries ===
Locomotive	Type	Builder	Builder's No.	Built	Entered service	Withdrawn	Notes
Pygmy	0-6-0T	Hudswell Clarke	296	1888	1916	c1961	Fitted with Leyland petrol engine
–	0-6-0ST	Andrew Barclay Sons & Co	1738	1922	1923	1933	Sold to John Lysaght, Port Kembla – Preserved by NSW Rail Museum – on loan to Richmond Vale Railway Museum
530X	0-6-0ST	Vulcan Foundry	834	1879	1932	c1961	ex New South Wales Government Railways 530X – partially scrapped – remains preserved Richmond Vale Railway Museum – on loan to Yass Tramway
Liverpool	0-6-4T	Beyer, Peacock & Company	2607	1866	1934	1943	ex J & A Brown No. 6

== Safeworking ==
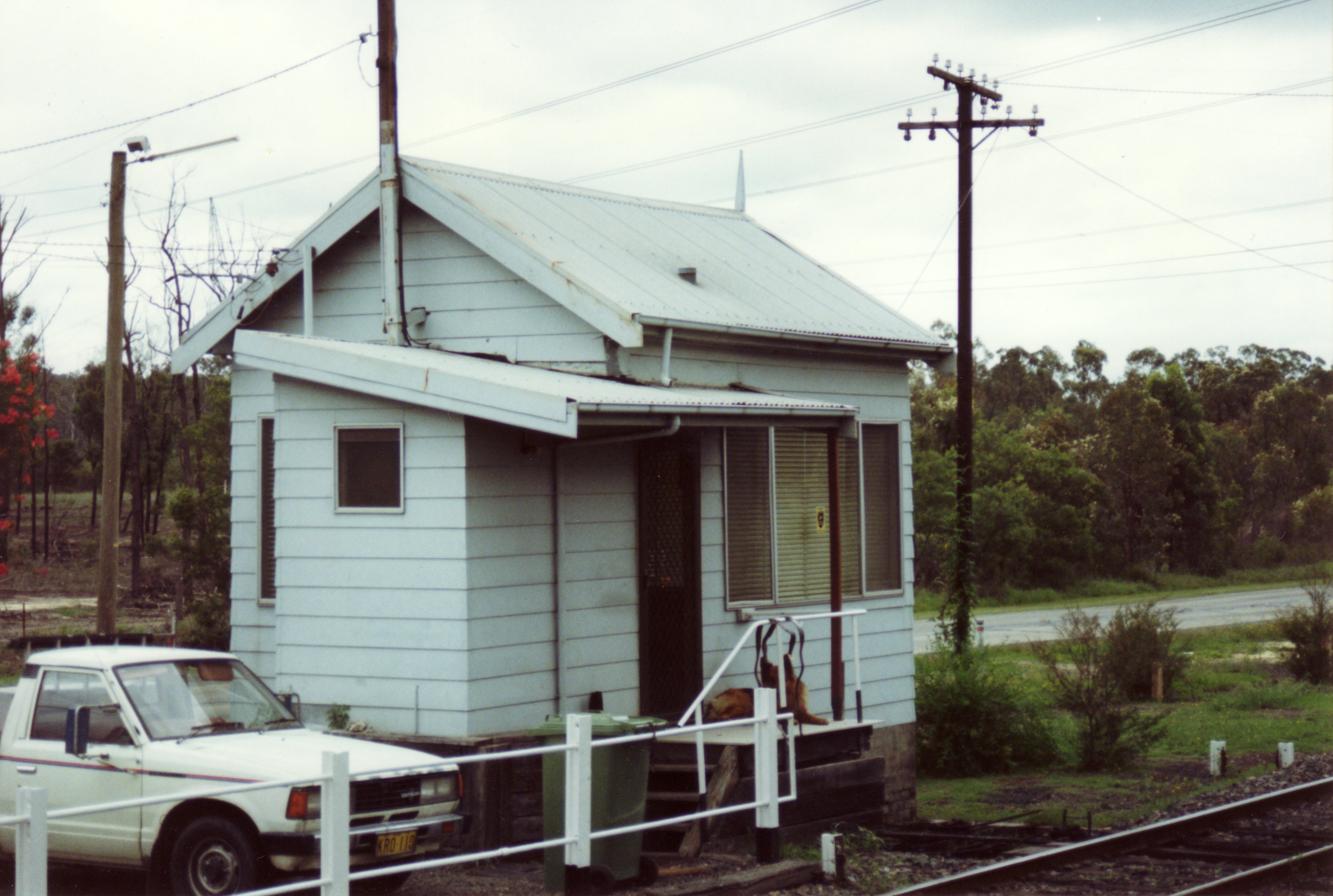
Neath Signal box, Feb 1995

Upon the opening of the Aberdare Railway to Cessnock, signal boxes were located at: East Greta Junction, East Greta, Aberdare Junction, Stanford Merthyr, Weston, Abermain and Cessnock. The signals & lever frames etc. were built by McKenzie and Holland. Safeworking on the single track line was by electric staff. Upon duplication of the main line, safeworking was provided by Tyers 3 wire block instruments, which were later replaced by Tyers 1 wire, 3 position instruments. The Stanford branch was worked by electric staff from Aberdare Junction. During duplication an additional signal box was opened at Neath. Additional signal boxes were later opened at Mt Dee, Bee Siding, Aberdare South Junction, Aberdare Central Junction and Bellbird Junction on the main line, and Kalingo Junction on the Kalingo branch. The Bellbird branch from Bellbird Junction to Bellbird Colliery, and the Pelton branch from Bellbird Colliery to Pelton were worked by electric staff instruments. From 1942, the Kalingo branch was worked by electric staff instruments from Bellbird Junction to Kalingo Junction. All the remaining branches worked by the South Maitland Railways were worked by Ordinary Train Staff. The colliery branch lines were worked by the "one engine in steam" system.

By 1976, with the downturn in traffic, signal boxes remained only at East Greta Junction, Weston, Neath and Caledonia. The double track had been cut back to Caledonia in 1973 with the closure of the lines to Cessnock station & Maitland Main Colliery; the electric staff instruments for the Bellbird branch were transferred to Caledonia signal box. On 27 November 1982 Weston Signal box closed. This was soon followed by the end of double track working on 7 December 1982 when the down line was taken out of use. Electric staff working was then used between East Greta Junction and Neath, and between Neath and Caledonia. Caledonia signal box closed from 10 June 1983 and the section from Neath to Pelton was then worked by Ordinary Train Staff, this was changed to Ordinary Train Staff and Ticket from 18 December 1984. Neath Signal box closed on 3 September 1996, leaving the entire branch from East Greta Junction to Pelton worked as a single section by Ordinary Train Staff and Ticket. The signal box at East Greta Junction remains open.

== Changes in ownership of South Maitland Railways ==
The railway line between East Greta Junction and Stanford Merthyr was owned and worked by the East Greta Coal Mining Co. When constructed, the Aberdare Railway was jointly controlled by the Australian Agricultural Company and the Aberdare Collieries Ltd of New South Wales, who entered into an agreement with the East Greta Company for haulage over the line. In February 1906, the AA Co. purchased the Aberdare Collieries' share in the Aberdare Railway, giving them 100% control of the Aberdare Railway, but the East Greta Coal Mining Co. continued to work trains over the line.

In 1918, the main line railway interests of Hebburn Ltd and the East Greta Coal Mining Co. were merged to form South Maitland Railways Ltd. This new company took over the ownership and operation of the Stanford Merthyr line and the Aberdare Railway, as well as all of the locomotives and passenger and goods rolling stock of the East Greta Co. The new company also took over the haulage over other colliery lines that were previously worked by the East Greta Co. On 8 and 9 December 2018, South Maitland Railway celebrated the centenary of this merger as well as 125 years since the running of the first train in 1893.

In April 1931, the East Greta Coal Mining Co. was taken over by J & A Brown and Abermain Seaham Collieries Ltd, which gave them a 50% share of SMR. In the 1940s, due to changes in company laws, South Maitland Railways Ltd was changed to South Maitland Railways Proprietary Limited. With the merger of JABAS with Caledonian Collieries in 1960 and the formation of Coal & Allied, the 50% share in SMR held by JABAS passed to this new company. In 1967, Coal & Allied purchased Hebburn Ltd which then gave them 100% control of South Maitland Railways. The SMR continued as a subsidiary of Coal & Allied until 1989 when SMR Pty Ltd was bought by a private consortium.

== Weston to Pelaw Main "Link Line" and flood workings ==
In 1936, a connection between the South Maitland system and the nearby J & A Brown owned Richmond Vale Railway was constructed from Pelaw Main Colliery to the SMR at Weston. This line was used by JABAS for any gas coal from its 3 Abermain collieries and Stanford Main No. 2 Colliery at Paxton that was to be shipped at the company's coal loader at Hexham, any coal that was to be shipped at the Dyke at Newcastle still had to travel over the SMR to East Greta Junction & the NSWGR to Newcastle. The trains were worked by South Maitland Railways from these collieries to an exchange siding adjacent to Pelaw Main Colliery, where the trains were then worked by the RVR to Hexham. With the opening of the coal preparation plant at Hexham, the traffic over the line increased as the small coal that was to be washed also travelled over the link line. The line fell out of use after the closure of rail operations at Abermain No. 2 Colliery in December 1963 and the connection with the SMR was lifted in August 1964, the line was lifted during 1973.

This connection to the Richmond Vale Railway provided an alternative connection to the Main North line at Hexham and was used as an alternate route to move the coal from the various Cessnock area collieries (including those not owned by JABAS) when the South Maitland lines were flooded at East Greta Junction during the 1949–1952 and 1955 floods. During these floods, RVR & SMR locomotives worked trains over both networks, with the SMR locos being serviced at the JABAS loco shed at Pelaw Main Colliery. During some of these floods when the SMR loco fleet was trapped at East Greta, locomotives were also hired from the New South Wales Government Railways.

== Relocation for Hunter Expressway construction ==
A 900-metre long section of the line was relocated, with a new bridge constructed to carry the railway line over the Hunter Expressway. The new section was built to mainline 1XC standards, with 60 kilogram per metre rails and concrete sleepers. The ends of the new section were adapted back to the existing lightweight rails. The owners of the line were given back the existing rails and serviceable hardwood sleepers from the bypassed section of line.
