= Stanford Merthyr, New South Wales =

Locality near Kurri Kurri, Australia

Stanford Merthyr
- Town
- Coordinates: 32°49′0″S 151°29′0″E
- Country: Australia
- State: New South Wales
- Region: Hunter
- City: City of Cessnock
- LGA: City of Cessnock
- Location: 32 km (20 mi) NW of Newcastle; 12.3 km (7.6 mi) SSW of Maitland; 149 km (93 mi) N of Sydney; 12.9 km (8.0 mi) E of Cessnock

Government
  - State electorate: Cessnock
  - Federal division: Hunter
- Elevation: 40 m (130 ft)
- Time zone: UTC+10 (AEST)
  - Summer (DST): UTC+11 (AEDT)
- Postcode: 2327
- County: Northumberland
- Parish: Stanford
Localities around Stanford Merthyr
Loxford	Loxford	Heddon Greta
Pelaw Main	Stanford Merthyr	Buchanan
Pelaw Main	Pelaw Main	Buchanan

Stanford Merthyr abuts the town of Kurri Kurri, in the Hunter Valley region, central-eastern New South Wales, Australia. The village is surrounded by bushland which separates it from the settlements of Pelaw Main and Kurri Kurri.

== Name origin ==
The name comes from the local land parish, Stanford, together with the south Wales town of Merthyr Tydfil, which produced high quality coal and steel, and represented high quality products. Through recruiting and immigration, the greater area saw the establishment of eisteddfods and brass bands, and the mine got the Welsh Mine nickname, with the majority of employees being Welsh.

== Early history ==
The area of Stanford Merthyr is Wonnarua and Darkinung First Nations country.

Prior to the coal mine and the village, the area was originally on the lands of L. A. Wilkinson and R. J. Taylor to the east, and Adams and Trenchard to the west of today's village.

== Coal mining (1901–1957) ==
Whilst coal was discovered in 1856 in the district, it was not until government assistant geological surveyor Edgeworth David mapped the field in 1886 that the size and commercial potential of the South Maitland coalfields became known. The first colliery was opened in 1891 at East Greta.

Note: Stanford Merthyr No. 2 Colliery is at Paxton, about 25 kilometres (16 mi) from the village and Stanford Merthyr No. 1 Colliery.

Commencing in 1901 by the East Greta Coal Mining Company with 1,300 acres (530 ha), the Stanford Merthyr Colliery (GPS 32.820134°S 151.4964579°E (Note: The council document indicates the colliery "was located on land adjacent to the now Kurri Bowling Club", but overlaying the HLRV map with Google Maps shows the main pit-head to be at least 900 metres (3,000 ft) ENE of the bowls club.)) produced in excess of 630,00 tons of superior quality gas coal by 1905, and employed about 370 workers (with 206 working underground). The coal seam was found to be 19 feet 5 inches (5.9 m) wide. Pit horses were used to move the rock to the surface.

The South Maitland Railway line was extended to reach the mine (the extension from East Greta to Stanford Merthyr estimated to be about £12,000 (equivalent to A$2.3M in 2025)), and a telephone line allowed connection with the East Gretna mine.

The mine productivity and employment was impacted by industrial disputes in the late-1920s and the 1930s. The J & A Brown and Abermain-Seaham Collieries Limited took over the East Greta Coal Mining Company after 1931, and the Stanford Merthyr Colliery became the Stanford Main No. 1 Colliery. It was also known at one time as the Stanford Greta No. 1 tunnel.

Following the 1923 Bellbird Mining Disaster, and legislative change, NSW's first mines rescue station was established at Abermain to the north-east. Electric safety lamps were introduced in 1927 to the mine.

The industry was affected by post-World War II mechanisation with large job losses. The now-Stanford Main No. 1 Colliery ceased operations on 24 May 1957, following the steady decline of the Greta/South Maitland coalfields. Nearby Pelaw Main closed in 1962, and Richmond Main in 1967. No remains of the mine exist, other than the heritage-listed railway easement. One station platform was along Railway Street before Dudley Street (GPS 32.823806°S 151.488175°E).

=== 1905 mine disaster ===
In the early hours of Saturday, 28 October 1905, the night watchman initially disregarded warning bells but later detected smoke from a mine tunnel, indicating fire in the mine. Raising the alarm, senior mine personnel arrived, and at 150 feet (46 m) down the main tunnel noticed large flames (up to 30 metres (98 ft) high); the burning continuing from 5:00 am to 8:00 am. Portions of the workings were sealed off for an airtight barrier using soil and clay, followed by works of a crew of bricklayers.

Unexpectedly at 11:30 am, there was a major explosion, and the now-twenty officials and workers in or at the tunnel mouth received the impacting blast, resulted in death or serious injury. Emergency responses were from volunteers, Kurri Kurri Fire Brigade, and local police officers, as well as a special rail train organised to convey the injured to the West Maitland hospital. A second but minor explosion occurred at 2:00 pm. All up, there were three explosions with houses feeling the explosions 0.5 miles (0.8 km) away, shaken as if it was a earthquake, and as far away as East and West Maitland.

Causes?

Theories for the fire/explosion included spontaneous combustion, a lighted lamp being left behind earlier, and misfired shot delay-exploding. Another theory was conglomerate and coal catching alight.

Rumours circulated that the fire was the work of an arsonist, there was "common talk in the district that certain persons were maliciously inclined towards the management", and a man had been seen near the colliery a few hours prior to the fire. The mine manager posted a £300 (equivalent to A$56,700 in 2025) reward; labourer Charles Libeck later being arrested and charged with arson, but the case was stopped due to insufficient evidence.

Funerals

After the Congregational Church service, the newly-formed brass band led the cortege to the Kurri Kurri cemetery for a mass grave after a graveside combined religious service. (Mine director Henry Adams was buried separately in a Maitland family plot.) A community-funded white marble monument was erected, in both English and Welsh:

Honoured, beloved and wept here our comrades lie.

Deaths:

- Henry John Adams (70 years of age), director
- John Evans (38 years of age), mine deputy
- James Greener (48 years of age), deputy
- David Jones (50 years of age), shiftman
- John W. Jones (43 years of age), shiftman
- George Fewin (34 years of age) – both legs broken burns about the face, hands, head and arms (died next day).

Injured:

- O. K. Young, merchant – fractured skull and leg
- Will Williams, undermanager – serious injuries to hand and foot
- Henry Thomas, manager – injuries to head and body
- Walter Jones, deputy manager – broken arm legs, and dislocated ankles
- George Leitch, deputy manager – arm amputated
- Colin McKenzie, bricklayer – thigh broken
- Evan Evans, deputy – jaw broken in three places, injury to eye, scalp wounds and burns generally.

The deaths represented 31.6% of that year's NSW coal/shale mine deaths; a saving grace only that the disaster occurred on a weekend when no one was working underground. Many of the initial responders were officials rather than miners; and reinforcing the Welsh Mine nickname, five of the six deceased were Welsh immigrants. The disaster left 415 men and boys, with disaster affecting about 1000 people.

Inquest

On 31 October 1905 at Kurri Kurri Courthouse, a coronial inquest was held with twenty-seven people giving evidence before the jury. Following an adjournment, and a site visit after the tunnels were unsealed on 26 June 1906, the verdict on 10 August 1906 was the explosion occurred due to coal gas distilled or generated from fire in the mine coming in contract with flame; but the cause of the naked flame remained unknown. Concerns were also expressed about some worker behaviour of smoking and carrying matches underground.

== Facilities ==
The Stanford Merthyr Infants School is a kindergarten-to-Grade 2 school, whose emblem features three pit-head towers.

Recreation may be found in Apex Park, the Wickham Street Reserve, Stanford Merthyr Park, the Pony Ground, and a playground in Wallsend Street.

The northern part of the village hosts the Kurri Kurri Bowls Club. Some of the small 1900s hipped roof cottages may still be found in the area.
