= Bellbird, New South Wales =

Bellbird
- Suburb
- Coordinates: 32°51′18″S 151°19′6″E
- Country: Australia
- State: New South Wales
- Region: Hunter
- City: Cessnock
- LGA: Cessnock
- Location: 7.6 km (4.7 mi) SE of Cessnock; 55.8 km (34.7 mi) WNW of Newcastle; 159 km (99 mi) S of Sydney
- Established: 1908

Government
  - State electorate: Cessnock
  - Federal division: Hunter

Area
  - Total: 7.6555 km^{2} (2.9558 sq mi)
- Elevation: 122 m (400 ft)

Population
  - Total: 2,338 (2021 census)
  - Density: 305.40/km^{2} (790.99/sq mi)
- Time zone: UTC+10 (AEST)
  - Summer (DST): UTC+11 (AEDT)
- Postcode: 2325
- County: Northumberland
- Parish: Cessnock
- Gazetted: 12 January 1910 (village); 24 October 1975 (town); 23 October 2015 (locality)
- Mean max temp: 24.2 °C (75.6 °F)
- Mean min temp: 10.5 °C (50.9 °F)
- Annual rainfall: 743.3 mm (29.26 in)
Suburbs around Bellbird
Mount View	Cessnock	Bellbird Heights
Mount View	Bellbird	Cessnock
Mount View	Pelton	Pelton

Bellbird is a town and locality in the City of Cessnock in the Hunter Region of New South Wales, Australia. It is 7.6 kilometres (4.7 mi) SE of Cessnock.

There is one school, the Bellbird Public School.

== Coal industry ==
Part of the South Maitland coalfields, the Hetton Colliery Company established a colliery at Bellbird before 1908. A branch railway of 3.5 miles (5.6 km) length was being undertaken in late 1910.

After lunch on 1 September 1923 the Hetton-Bellbird Colliery suffered a fire followed by an explosion, resulting in the death of twenty-one miners and their pit ponies. It was nine months before the mine was entered and the miners' bodies recovered. The subsequent 1923 Bellbird Mining Disaster inquiry saw the introduction of the Mines Rescue Act 1925 (NSW) and an improvement in mining safety standards. A memorial was built in 1990 to remember the deaths (GPS 32.860161°S 151.319678°E).

The Bellbird South, Pelton, and Ellalong collieries were incorporated into the Southland Colliery in 1998, and in 2004 that colliery was renamed as the Austar coal mine.
