= Hill End Colliery fire =

Underground coal-seam fire

The Hill End Colliery fire was an underground coal-seam fire. it burned from, at latest, August 1930 to at least early 1945, and most probably as late as June 1949. The impact of the fire was magnified by its close proximity to the mining town of Cessnock, New South Wales, Australia. The worst and most spectacular outbreak of the fire occurred on 8, 9 and 10 March 1933.

== Hill End Colliery ==
The Hill End Colliery was a small "unassociated" colliery, operated by the Hill End Colliery Company in the vast South Maitland Coalfield. It was located just off Maitland Road, about a mile from the Post Office at Cessnock, in a gully on the back of a hill that overlooks the town. It was operating by 1888. It employed only 20 men in 1929. Its coal was shipped via coal sidings, at Caledonia station on the Cessnock branch line of the South Maitland Railway. It was brought there from the mine in skips over a light railway that ran along Melbourne Street, in Aberdare, a suburb of Cessnock. The term "unassociated" seems to have meant that the colliery was independent of the four large companies that dominated the northern coalfields of New South Wales.

The coal seam at the mine was close to the surface, only around 50 feet (15 m) down. Shallow underground mines are prone to underground fires, because fissures caused by subsidence may reach the surface. Such fissures let air into old workings, even ones that have been sealed, potentially causing spontaneous combustion of the coal or allowing air to the site of an underground fire. Heavy rainfall tends to widen the fissures, leading to further subsidence, as surface water runs into the mine workings. Once a fire breaks out in a shallow mine, the coal consumed by fire creates a void, resulting in more subsidence of the land, exacerbating the conditions that support the continuation of the fire.

== Outbreak of the fire ==
The fire probably began on 11 August 1930, when a spark from the draught fire set alight to the timber lining of the airshaft. By 8:20 p.m., the timber lining was well alight. Firemen from the Cessnock Fire Brigade, had been called around 9 p.m.. By lowering firehoses into the airshaft and fighting the fire simultaneously from the top and bottom of the airshaft, they had extinguished the fire, with great difficulty and facing the risk of falling timber, by around midnight. The woodwork of the airshaft and a hut on the surface were destroyed. Although a small part of the coal seam, in old workings of the mine, had also caught fire, it was thought at the time to have been extinguished. If this small coal seam fire actually was not completely extinguished, that would explain subsequent events. However, it later emerged that there had been ‘a heating’ noted in a mine inspection report in 1929, and in the same year some mine subsidence was reported. That earlier report would be consistent with spontaneous combustion being the cause. So, the ultimate cause of the subsequent coal seam fire, and the time it began, remains uncertain.

== Coal seam fire ==
After the shaft fire, the mine reopened in June 1931. By March 1932, nearby residents were complaining of gases rising from fissures in the ground above new areas of mine subsidence. It was apparent that there was an active coal seam fire in the old workings. The gases were mainly highly poisonous carbon monoxide generated by partial combustion of the underlying coal seam. The area was said to be "smoking like a volcano".

The fire presented several dangers. There were houses in the area, exposed to a risk of collapse as the fire consumed the coal seam and the surrounding land subsided. Parents were warned to keep their children away due to the risk caused by poisonous gases. There was also a risk that the fire would reach the boundary of the mining lease and burn through the two chains (40 m) of coal that separated it from the disused workings of the far larger Aberdare Colliery, allowing the fire to spread much further.

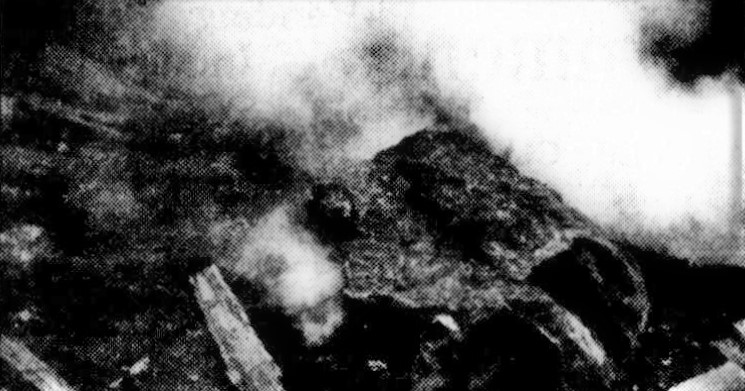
Smoke and fumes belch from a 'crater' (Sept. 1932)

By the end of September 1932, the smoke and fumes had become worse and the fire became a political issue for the New South Wales Government. There were ten surface depressions, described as "craters" and smoke "hung like a haze in several streets of East Cessnock". The smell of the fire carried for over a mile, and a mine inspector was scalded while trying to obtain samples. The area of the mine where the fire burned had been sealed off, but mining continued in other parts of the small colliery. A government grant of £250 was made available to pay unemployed workers to suppress the fire, by filling the "craters" with earth. That amount was to be but a small fraction of what would be needed over the following years.

The mining company, apparently recognising that the fire would spread to the rest of the mine, began removing rails and equipment from the underground workings, in preparation to seal the mine entrance and air shaft. Operations ceased in September and the mine officially was abandoned in November 1932.

In November 1932, around the time that the mine had been abandoned, it was thought that the fire had been subdued. The company was by then in liquidation, leaving the N.S.W. Government with responsibility for future problems. However, at the end of December 1932, events took a turn for the worse. The larger of the "craters" was "40 feet deep. 20 feet wide, and 100 feet long". It emerged that only £70 of the government grant had been spent, to fill in the crater from which the most fumes emanated, but that had the effect of forcing the emissions to come out of other such "craters".

== Crisis ==
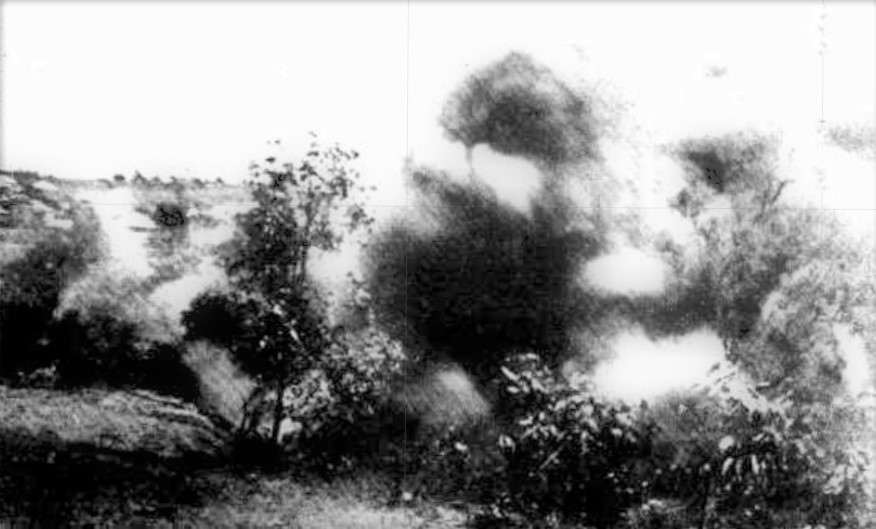
Smoke rising from a "crater", around the time of the most serious outbreak, in March 1933.

On 8 March 1933, the position had become markedly worse. The workings had collapsed in several new places, and around 9:15 pm the first visible flames emerged from fissures. Soon, columns of flames 20 feet (6.1 m) high and at times up to 100 feet (30 m) high were coming from the ground, "as if driven by bellows". The flames were reported to have illuminated the town. Filling of the crater, with the most significant flaming, subdued the flames in that area. There had been more subsidence and in some places the crust was only two feet in depth. Police patrolled the area to keep the numerous sightseers away. There was once again concern that the fire would spread to the Aberdare Colliery workings, only 30 to 60 yards (27 to 55 metres) away. In the early hours of 10 March 1933, an explosion blew out the seal over the mouth of the entrance to the mine. The fire spread and flames 30 feet (9.1 m) high were coming from its entrance. Paradoxically, the explosion actually improved the situation, because it drew the growth of the fire away from the boundary with the Aberdare Colliery. By 16 March 1933, although still emitting smoke and noxious fumes, the severity of the fire had decreased, as operations to fill "craters" continued.

A month after the renewed outbreak, most of the active craters had been filled and the mine entrance resealed. It was thought that the fire had been subdued, despite a small amount of smoke and fumes still coming from fissures, but in July 1933 more subsidence occurred and it was clear that the fire was still spreading through the coal seam. It continued to do so slowly, over the following year, with new subsidence being filled. However, it appeared that the worst was over.

== Subsequent re-occurrences ==
There was another instance of subsidence near the sealed tunnel entrance to the mine, accompanied by sulphurous fumes, viewed as a renewal of the fire, on 27 June 1935. More subsidence occurred in September 1937. The fire continued to burn but, due to a long run of dry weather, it remained subdued, although the site continued to be dangerous. New fissures developed in January 1942, which became worse by the following November, indicating that the fire was still burning. The mine was still subsiding and emitting poisonous fumes in February 1945. The mine caught alight again in June 1949; this may have been a separate fire, but it was more likely the last reoccurrence of the original fire. The outbreak was extinguished. In 1954, the area was still too dangerous to use as a short cut between East Cessnock and Aberdare. When the underground fire finally died out remains uncertain.

== Aftermath ==
There were underground fires at three mines at Greta at around the same time in the early 1930s, but of the four fires, the Hill End Colliery fire was the most spectacular. In 1946, there would be another spectacular shallow-mine coal seam fire at the Cessnock No.2 mine. The fire at the Hill End Colliery, and others like it, in shallow mines, would be used to justify the more widespread use of open-cut mining techniques to exploit shallow deposits of coal in the region.

The fire is now largely forgotten; a history of the Cessnock Fire Brigade does not mention it, although in August 1930 the firemen were lauded for their efforts. It is known that there was some film footage showing the fire, still being shown in 1950, but it very likely no longer exists. The area affected by the fire has never been built upon.
