= Tim Caban =

Australian cricketer (born 1952)

Personal information
- Born: 15 January 1952 (age 74); Cessnock, New South Wales, Australia
- Batting: Right-handed
- Bowling: Right-arm medium
- Source: Cricinfo, 1 October 2020

Tim Caban (born 15 January 1952) is an Australian cricketer who was an all-rounder. He played in one first-class match for Queensland in 1975/76.

Caban began his cricket career at the age of nine playing junior cricket for the Aberdare Rangers scoring 85 not out in his first game. He made his B grade debut at twelve and his first grade debut at fourteen making 28 and taking two wickets playing his early grade cricket in Cessnock.

He moved to Brisbane in the 1970s and played for Northern Suburbs, Colts, and Western Suburbs in Brisbane Grade Cricket, and in November 1975 he was selected to represent Queensland in a tour game against the West Indies Test squad due to injuries to Sam Trimble and Jeff Thomson. He took the wicket of Roy Fredericks and scored four runs in the match which Queensland lost by an innings.

Caban returned to New South Wales in the late 1970s and played for the Stockton & Northern Districts Cricket Club during its most successful period. In 2002 he moved to the UK and played for Woodford Wells facing Brett Lee in a match at the age of fifty-six. He played his last cricket match in England for Woodford Wells at the age of fifty-nine and scored 85 not out.

== See also ==
- List of Queensland first-class cricketers
