= Austar coal mine =

Former mine in New South Wales

- Interactive map of Austar coal mine
- Location: New South Wales, Australia; 32°53′52″S 151°18′15″E
- Products: Coking coal
- Closed: c. 2021
- Company: Yancoal
- Website: https://www.yancoal.com.au/our-sites/austar/
- Acquired: 2004

The Austar coal mine, formerly the Southland colliery, is an underground coal mine complex located near Paxton, New South Wales, Australia, slated for closure. The mining complex is about 17 by 16 kilometres (10.6 mi × 9.9 mi) mine field.

The Austar operations were between Middle and Ellalong Roads, Paxton (GPS 32.898242°S 151.305965°E). The company operated a secondary site at Wollombi Road, Pelton for coal handling (GPS 32.873514°S 151.301696°E).

In 2012, the mine had an annual production capacity of three million tonnes of coal and employed 409 people. The mine has coal reserves amounting to 221 million tonnes of coking coal, one of the largest coal reserves in Asia and the world.

== History ==
Whilst coal was discovered in 1856 in the district, it was not until government assistant geological surveyor Edgeworth David mapped the field in 1886 that the size and commercial potential of the South Maitland coalfields became known. The first colliery was opened in 1891 at East Greta.

The Austar colliery incorporated the former Pelton, Cessnock No. 1 (Kalingo) and Ellalong collieries near Paxton, all of which had closed during the coal slumps, and was opened (or re-opened) in July 1979. The adjoining old Bellbird South colliery was later added, and the entire complex was renamed Southland Colliery.

In October 2004 there was an underground fire and the mine was sealed.

The company, Gympie Gold, was forced into receivership and the mine was placed in a 'care and maintenance' position. In December 2004 the Chinese company Yancoal purchased the colliery, changed its name to Austar Coal Mine, and recommenced operations.

In April 2014, a wall collapse killed two workers from pressure releases, with concerns expressed about Austar's safety management system.

The mine moved to care and maintenance in March 2020. Yancoal proceeded to close the Austar Coal Mine in February 2021.

== Former collieries ==
=== Bellbird South ===
Bellbird is SE of Cessnock. The mine was considered of the most productive in the district, although conflicts between management and the workers resulted in strike action, which in 1921 saw 12 days idle over three months. In 1952, the colliery was producing 1550 tons of high quality coal per day.

The town was subject to the Hetton-Bellbird Colliery fire and explosion, which resulted in the death of 21 miners and their pit ponies. The 1923 Bellbird Mining Disaster became subject to an inquiry and changes in mine rescue and other mining regulations.

By 1945, Bellbird had three mines, No. 1, No. 2, and No. 3. It is unknown if any became Bellbird South, which was located to the west of Wollombi Road, Bellbird (GPS c. 32.865191°S 151.321187°E).

The Bellbird South pit top, and some open cut mines were rehabilitated by the early 2010s, and little aboveground infrastructure remains.

=== Cessnock No. 1 (Kalingo) ===
In May 1914 the proposed Kalingo Colliery at Ellalong which had been abandoned temporarily was to be restarted. It was owned by the Great Northern Company by April 1922. The shaft was 22 feet (6.7 m) in a diameter. It was active again by 1925.

By late 1940 the mine was now known as the Cessnock No.1 (Kalingo) Colliery, and owned by Cessnock Collieries Limited. It was operating at a depth of 1,240 feet (378 m). A modern setup was in place: First grade coal was being cut by the Mavor and Coulson cutter on a caterpillar track, a Joy loader used to fill the coal skips, and the skips were hauled around to the electric battery locomotives, before the skips raised to the surface using a steam winding engine. After the coal is emptied by the tippler, it is then classified at the vibrating screens, before going onto the transverser.

In 1961, the Cessnock No. 1 Colliery amalgamated with the Pelton Colliery, and is about 370 metres (1,210 ft) deep.

Little remained by 2023 of any above-ground structures of the No. 1 colliery (GPS 32.904573°S 151.326599°E).

=== Ellalong ===
Ellalong, 4 miles (6.4 km) south of Cessnock, was found to have coal deposits, and by 1908, 2,000 acres (810 ha) was secured by English and Scottish capitalists for a colliery. With a railway extension proposed from the existing Aberdare Colliery, production was expected of 2000 tons per day. A second but smaller colliery was also going to be created closer to Cessnock.

A 7 miles (11 km) rail extension from Bellbird junction commenced after September 1915.

In April 1922 the mine was experiencing water issues at 60 feet (18 m) depth whilst the shaft was down to 107 feet (33 m).

In October 1923, a new bore was done 1 mile (1.6 km) from the town's racecourse and went down 1,000 feet (305 m).

Industrial disputes in January 1930 saw a police baton charge towards 1500 mine workers, who had to run into the bushland.

In 1948 another colliery near the lagoon was proposed, as well as an electrical power station.

In 1996 the state premier stated planning consent was given for the colliery expansion, worth $8.5M, and creating 360 jobs.

In 2026, some above-ground infrastructure remains at Dry Creek Road (GPS 32.935522°S 151.326115°E).

=== Pelton ===
Pelton is south of Cessnock and north of Ellalong. In September 1916, the Newcastle Wallsend Coal Company sought a railway extension from the Bellbird Colliery Railway to the Pelton Colliery, of 1.5 miles (2.4 km). The mine itself, 2 miles (3.2 km) from Bellbird, was part of the Greta seam, and measured to be 13 feet 6 inches (4.1 m) thick. A brick-making plant was getting challenged with recent lack of water, and a permanent brick kiln was in the plans; and timber supplies from the company's Wollambi lands, with a sawmill site being constructed. A blasting incident occurred in the new mine when the shotfirers had two of three shots go off. After waiting, re-entering and inspecting, exiting and waiting, re-entered just as the charge exploded; Fortunately to non-fatal injuries.

It was expected production mining would commence in early March 1918. Not long after, the Colliery Mechanics' Association was aggrieved by the presence of non-union workers on site.

Horses were used in the 1920s.

The site experienced several fatalities. In May 1924, a 24-year-old boss wheeler when on the surface was kicked in the head by a horse, and died the next day in the Cessnock hospital. In December 1940, when a 56-year-old miner died from a stone roof fall, cleaning up after several firing of shot. In November 1949, a 55-year-old died when hit by a skip at the tippler.

In August 1942 during World War II, 220 miners were on strike over a safety issue.

By 1961, the colliery was producing 300,000 tons of washed coal a year.

In September 1987 the Newcastle Wallsend Coal Company-owned Pelton-Ellalong collieries were in lockdown for over ten days of industrial issues, involving 400 employees.

The mine was regarded as disused by October 1993. The last of the area's pits, the Pelton/Ellalong Colliery was closed after miners worked their last shift on Friday 8 May 1998. The mine was wound down in 1997 from its 250 workers.

== See also ==
- South Maitland coalfields
