= Abermain, New South Wales =

Abermain
- Suburb
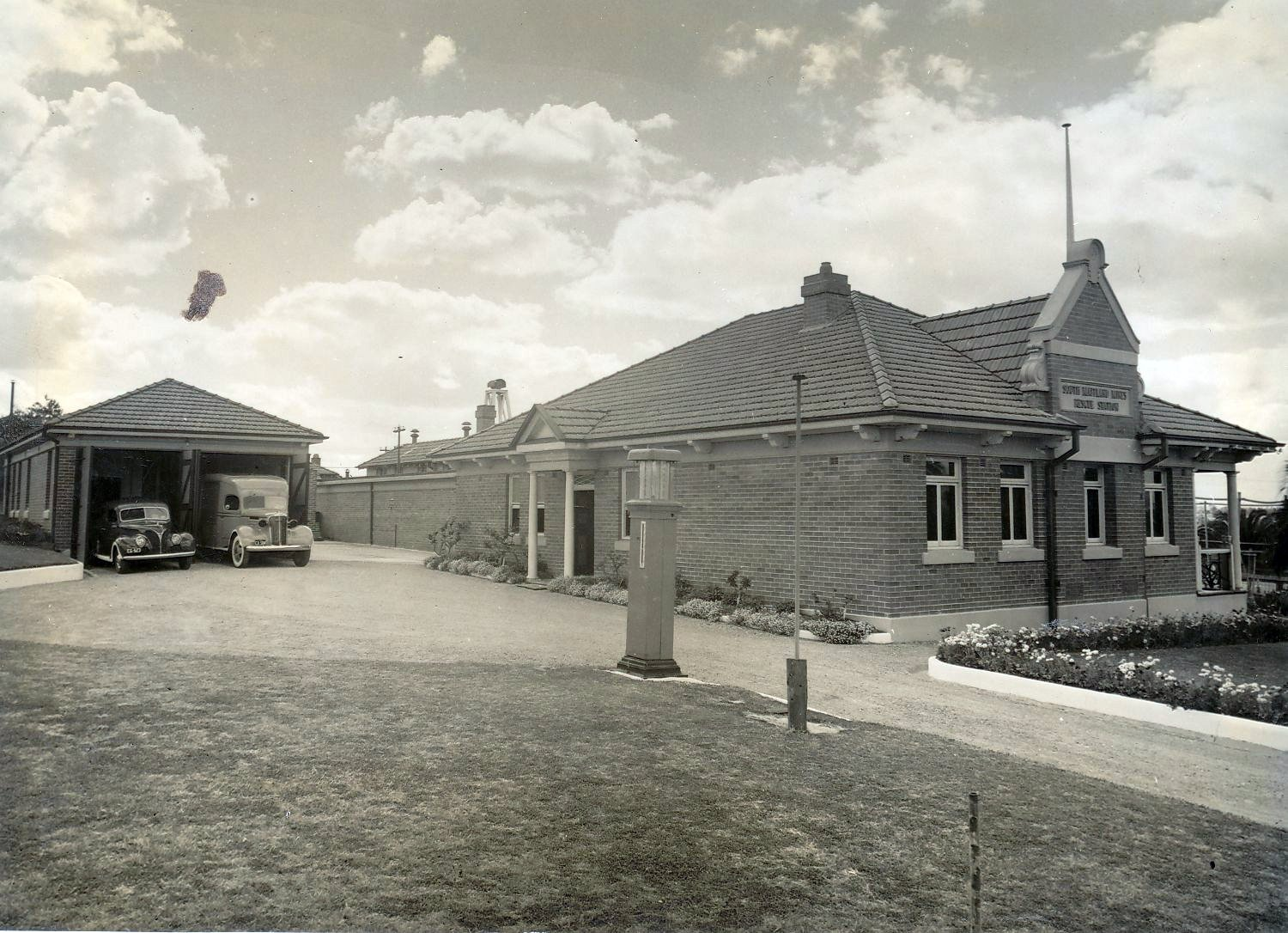
- South Maitland Mines Rescue Station in Abermain

- Interactive map of Abermain
- Coordinates: 32°48′26″S 151°25′39″E
- Country: Australia
- State: New South Wales
- Region: Hunter
- City: Cessnock
- LGA: Cessnock
- Location: 7.9 km (4.9 mi) ENE of Cessnock; 42.0 km (26.1 mi) NW of Newcastle; 153 km (95 mi) N of Sydney
- Established: 1903

Government
  - State electorate: Cessnock
  - Federal division: Hunter

Area
  - Total: 15.3822 km^{2} (5.9391 sq mi)
- Elevation: 29 m (95 ft)

Population
  - Total: 2,544 (SAL 2021)
- Time zone: UTC+10 (AEST)
  - Summer (DST): UTC+11 (AEDT)
- Postcode: 2326
- County: Northumberland
- Parish: Heddon, Stanford
- Gazetted: 24 October 1975 (town); 23 October 2015 (locality)
- Mean max temp: 24.2 °C (75.6 °F)
- Mean min temp: 10.5 °C (50.9 °F)
- Annual rainfall: 743.3 mm (29.26 in)
Suburbs around Abermain
Cessnock	Sawyers Gully	Weston
Neath	Abermain	Pelaw Main
Cessnock	Cessnock	Richmond Vale

Abermain is a town in the Hunter Valley region, central-eastern New South Wales, Australia. It was founded in 1903 with the advent of commercial coal mining. It is 8 kilometres (5.0 mi) ENE of Cessnock and 3 kilometres (1.9 mi) west of Weston. Swamp Creek flows through the town.

Abermain is adjacent to Werakata National Park.

== Name origin ==
Both Abermain and nearby Aberdare are named for mining towns in south Wales. (Note: Is Abermain a misspelling of Aberaman, Wales, or was there formerly a Welsh village or place called Abermain? (Aber is a Welsh name indicating a convergence of rivers.))

== History ==
=== Pre-1900 ===
The area of Abermain is Wonnarua and Darkinung First Nations country.

European settler William Tester had found coal post-flood along Deep Creek. Following the 1884 work of state government geologist Charles Wilkinson on the northern part of the South Maitland field for coal, Wilkinson directed assistant geological surveyor Edgeworth David to conduct a more detailed study. On 3 August 1886 David found the Greta coal seam was part of the Lochinvar Dome, on Deep Creek (Note: That southern/private town section of Deep Creek is now called Swamp Creek, and Deep Creek is to the north of the town.) in the vicinity of what became Abermain No. 1 colliery. Mining in the greater Maitland coalfield started slowly, but was impacted by a global downturn in the industry before 1900.

=== 1900– ===
Coal mining in Abermain commenced in 1903 with the first tunnel opened, and the train services on the Aberdare line being prepared. A railway station was being erected, complete with a ticket office, waiting room and ladies waiting room, together with a long platform. Miners had formed a lodge and joined the federation by December 1903. Abermain was just one of many towns suddenly appearing from the scrub across the South Maitland coalfields. The Abermain Colliery, Limited, was registered by mid-April 1903, with capital of £100,000 (equivalent to A$18.51M in 2025), which in part sought to buy some of the mining leases from the Aberdare Collieries of New South Wales, Limited.

The original railway line was the private railway of the East Greta Colliery Company. John Callaghan's 32 acres (13 ha) estate was considered to be the private town of Abermain, with street names of William, Mary, Charles, and Elizabeth. (The remaining allotments of Callaghan's estate was to be auctioned in December 1906.) Deep Creek was to be the town and mining water supply.

Abermain Post Office opened on 1 June 1904.

In 1905, the two-storey Abermain Hotel (GPS 32.813306°S 151.431611°E) was opened at Charles and William Streets, costing £3000 (equivalent to A$566,900 in 2025). The first licensee was Henry Hector who shortly after transferred it to Mr and Mrs William Ward. At this time the town had two stores, a butcher shop, two doctors surgeries (Doctors Sadler and King, and Doctor Fisher), the Baltic Club (workers club), Mrs Patterson's post office which also had a refreshments counter, and a barbershop on Elizabeth Street. With poor roads, the railway line and station were a town meeting place. Police officers were based in nearby Weston. Mass was held in the Roman Catholic school room, while Abel's Hall was utilised for the Church of England services.

In April 1908, the portions of subdivided Crown land north of the railway line went to auction (in the Parish of Heddon, whereas the existing town was south of the railway line and in the Parish of Stanford). Most streets bore the names of NSW towns. The north-eastern portions were opened later.

A friendly society, the Abermain lodge of the Grand United Order of Free Gardeners first met in April 1908, and later held an annual ball. By 1909, there was the Abermain Cricket Club, and a rugby football club.

A School of Arts was formed in 1909, and in 1910, the committee was requesting a grant of land. On Saturday 19 February 1916, the foundation stone was laid of the intended now-brick building, at the expected cost of £893 (equivalent to A$114,080 in 2025), including placing within a cavity below the stone, that day's Newcastle Morning Herald in a bottle. The building was opposite the fire station, and would have a lecture, committee, and reading rooms, and library. Saturday, 19 August 1916 saw the now-building officially opened. By 1919, it had 422 subscribers, had purchased 100 books, and issued twelve scholarships (eight for the public school, four for the convent school). Richard Howe went to serve as the president for twenty years until retiring from the district in August 1936 after the loss of his Maitland Street house to fire. (He had also been secretary of the Abermain Progress Association.) The school also went on to serve as a state and federal election polling booth. Today it serves as the Sir Edgeworth David Memorial Museum, at Cessnock Road and Orange Street.

=== 1910– ===
By 1912, the three-story large-verandah brick Hotel Denman (GPS 32.811667°S 151.437806°E) had been constructed on Alfred Street with Cessnock Road; the licensee being John Lambie. It was later taken over by Mr and Mrs M. Hourigan, who relinquished the hotel in June 1924. The hotel's safe was stolen in February 1932, and explosives uses to remove the door and steal £109 (equivalent to A$13,160 in 2025). By 2026, it was a partially-renovated two-storey building relabelled as 'Qirkz in the Hunter'.

A fire station was constructed in September 1913. (Fire and Rescue NSW is positioned at Cessnock Road and Charles Street.)

The Cessnock and Abermain Friendly Societies Association was formed also in September 1913, representing in the area the Australasian Holy Catholic Guild (AHC Guild), Grand United Order of Oddfellows Friendly Society (GUOOF), Hibernian Australasian Catholic Benefit Society (HACBS), Independent Order of Oddfellows (IOOF), Independent Order of Rechabites, Grand United Order of Free Gardeners, Manchester Unity Independent Order of Oddfellows (MUIOOF), and the Protestant Alliance Friendly Society. The society held their first sports day on Anniversary Day], 26 January 1914. At this time Abermain had just the Free Gardeners and GUOOF (Pride of Abermain Lodge (No. 6761)).

The Abermain Caledonian Society was in existence by November 1914, where a Hallowe'en supper and dance was held with about sixty people in attendance. There was also the Abermain Pipe Band in 1916. About 60% of the members went to the Front, but the society was reorganised together with a kiltie band, and was still active by 1924.

During World War I the area formed the Abermain Ladies Soldiers' Comforts Committee as well as the Abermain and Neath Returned Soldiers' Association. The Abermain War Memorial was a WW1 gun near the fire station, but sought to be replaced in August 1945. At least two local members served in the Korean War in 1951.

The Abermain Male Voice Choir was formed in 1918, and although quite successful over the years under conductor R. Hanley, both that choir and the Abermain Choral Society disbanded in May 1936.

In 1919 the Abermain Eisteddfod was going to be held in April, in aid of the local Methodist church, but postponed due to the global 1918–1920 flu pandemic. The West Wallsend male voice choir was formed in February of that year, and intended to enter the eisteddfod. The 1919 event was rescheduled for Scott's Hall, for Friday, 7 November, and Saturday, 8 November. The eighth annual event was held in September 1926 over five sessions, and included male voice choirs, and a mouth organ competition. However the committee determined it would cancel the annual music festival from 1930, a result of the Great Depression. The eisteddfod was paused during World War II. The thirty-seventh annual eisteddfod was held in 1954, including vocal and instrumental sections, elocution, dancing – with 2668 competitors across the various sections. The event continued to be held to at least 1974.

The town about this time supported a rifle club, and scouts, football, and a Methodist Girls' Club.

=== 1920– ===
In the second half of 1921 the Abermain Town Band was formed, with new instruments costing £700 (equivalent to A$107,600 in 2025). Elected conductor George Nicholls was considered "one of the best known bandmasters in Australia".

In September 1925, the town made national news where one of four gathered Wilson brothers was shot dead, and another was seriously wounded at the Hotel Denman. The coronial inquiry concluded it was not murder but accidental death.

The Abermain Amateur Bicycle Club was established and conducting road races by 1926. The town also had soccer and tennis clubs. On the boxing from, "perhaps one of the most talented sportsmen every produced from this area", Al Singleton, with the boxing name of "Tiger", was born in the town and left after finishing school. The featherweight boxer was active from 1929 to 1937, and took the state title.

The Abermain Masonic Lodge was formed by 1935 and still in existence by 1951.

Another friendly society, the Loyal Abermain Lodge (No. 606) of the Manchester Unity Independent Order of Oddfellows was formed by 1938. (The Weston lodge had been active by October 1920.)

=== 1940– ===
A town war memorial and returned soldiers' war memorial hall in 1946 was proposed for near the fire station. The local Returned Soldiers' League had also previously pondered the possibility. It was suggested to name the area after local Victoria Cross awardee Clarence Jeffries, as the "Clarence War Memorial Hall and Park". In May 1947 the Kearsley Shire Council gave a grant to the Abermain Citizens' Committee towards the purpose. (The previous Cessnock Shire Council had made the land available for a public park in 1924.) The memorial and playground is now within Jeffries Park (GPS 32.811111°S 151.430722°E).

Town streets were still a dirt surface, but it was proposed to tar them.

In first half of the 1950s, the local collieries were experiencing industrial action from the miners' lodges, and losing production.

In August 1958 a miner, who murdered his wife by striking her with a blunt object, was found not guilty on the grounds of insanity.

=== 1960– ===
In first half of the 1960s, the local collieries started reducing workers due to overproduction and declining corporate profitability.

After established in 1971 at Kurri Kurri, the Sir Edgeworth David Memorial Museum and Coalfields Local History Association Incorporated moved to the Abermain School of Arts building. It covers family, military, social, and industrial history of the area, with over 5000 items in the collection.

=== 1980– ===
The orchid Pterostylis chaetophora (Taree rustyhood) was first described in 1989 from a specimen collected near the town.

In 1994, with the closure of the Holy Trinity Church, the Jeffries Chair in honour of deceased WW1 Captain Clarence Jeffries VC was moved to the Christ Church Cathedral, Newcastle.

=== 2000– ===
In February 2001 a conflict between outlaw motorcycle gangs of the Bandidos and the Gypsy Jokers saw the Abermain home of a Bandidos member strafed in a drive-by shooting; and their club president killed the month later at the nearby Weston clubhouse.

In 2024 as part of the Maitland–Cessnock railway passenger line proposal, the Abermain station would be reopened. The former station platform (GPS 32.81155°S 151.42861°E) remains near Cessnock Road, along with the rusted disused railway lines.

Shift change at the colliery, pre-1930s.

== Coal mining ==
Coal was first noticed in 1840 by a local settler, and a South Maitland coalfields survey undertaken in 1884. Due to other mines and a short global downturn, Abermain did not start commercial mining until 1903.

In 1903 the Abermain Colliery employed about 30 coalminers (and 70 hands in total), who received a daily wage, and not based on mining tonnage. The seam was at least 14 feet (4.3 m) thick, with a small band of clay. The coal itself was hard, heavy, and bright, and suitable for gas or steaming coal. The main tunnel was at a depth of 600 feet (180 m), and coal-cutting machinery being sourced. A second haulage engine was being erected, as well as a large store room; with the chimney stack of the boiler house expected to be 70 feet (21 m) high. (Mechanical coal-cutting use decreased by 1929.)

By 1905 the Abermain Colliery Company Limited employed over 200 persons, of about 300 persons in the town. The underground mine was managed by Mr R. Kelsick, with a good coal seam, suitable machinery, and good ventilation. The company owned lands both south and west, and north, of the East Greta Colliery Company railway line. Joshua Jeffries commenced as manager of the colliery in June 1906. In 1910 he selected and designed the Abermain No. 2 colliery, which outputted daily up to 1800 tons. Later still Jeffries designed the Abermain No. 3 colliery, which went to 600 feet (180 m) depth. (The three mines later became part of the J. and A. Brown and Abermain Seaham Collieries Limited.)

Workers went on strike in June 1922 in support of other miners in the district. The colliery was acquired by Broken Hill Proprietary Mines by 1926, when the mines had been subject of industrial strikes. The 1926 inquiry into coal mines examining the need for safety lamps due to flammable gases, and use of explosives, saw the managers of both the Abermain No. 1 and No. 2 collieries give evidence (John Jeffries and Idris Evans respectively). More industrial action occurred during the Great Depression in 1929. January 1930 also saw unlawful assembly at the colliery when almost 800 men marched onto colliery property, many carrying sticks, and intimidating staff.

Miners were killed from the fall of coal and other incidents, including William Hartshorn in September 1911, Henry James in January 1912, and James Stewart in February 1925. Almost 600 miners narrowly avoided entombment when the ceiling collapsed in October 1923.

Australia's second mine rescue station and NSW's first, South Maitland Mines Rescue Station, was constructed in 1926 and at cost of £20,000 (equivalent to A$1,977,000 in 2025). This was in response to the loss of 21 men in the 1923 Bellbird Mining Disaster following a colliery fire and explosion. It was located as the approximate centre of the greater district. Mine safety regulation had been resisted by mine owners to this point. It was closed in 1983 as a move in the industry from South Maitland to the Upper Hunter region.

The smaller Jeffries' mine colliery was in operation by 1932, and is 300 yards (270 m) from Hotel Denman. There were concerns of subsidence from the mine in October 1933.

In December 1944 the old Abermain No. 1 colliery was reopened, after years of closure when the pit-head was dismantled.

=== 1950– ===
South Maitland coal conservation started being examined in the early 1950s, to achieve optimal working, efficiency, and safety. The Miners' Federation was concerned about changing from hand labour to machine, and the mining of supporting pillars. (Note: Union views against pillar mining view started changing by August 1954.) Haulage was also changing from pit ponies to powered-cable skips or trucks.

Production was also impacted by various actions. In May 1953, thirty-one mines including Abermain No. 2 were inactive due to a dispute over the dismissal of a mining lodge official. In April 1954 one strike was for better rates for certain miners and wheelers in Hebburn No. 1, with sympathy from sixteen mines including Abermain No. 1 and No. 3; and with all other issues, twenty-four mines were idle. (Note: South of Weston, the Hebburn No. 1 mine is about 2.8 kilometres (1.7 mi) ESE of Abermain No. 1 mine.) In early 1955, some industrial action resulted in Abermain No. 1 and No. 3 being idle. In the same month, Abermain No. 2 held a pit-top meeting, and would do a one-day stoppage each week due to a delay in providing underground transport in the colliery.

The Abermain No. 2 colliery was closed in 1958, with the loss of 310 jobs; along with Stanford Greta, Hebburn No. 1, Ringwood, and Belmont North. It was later reopened with a smaller number of workers.

There was a suggestion the operating companies no longer saw the mines as profitable, and "a great national asset" was going to be abandoned, as had happened with Abermain, Aberdare, Kalangra, and most recently in February 1961, Pelaw Main. In 1963 at the Abermain No. 2 colliery again, due to overproduction, 70 workers were dismissed. In December 1963, on the basis of overproduction and excessive stockpiling, notices of dismissal were served on 98 Abermain No. 2 mine workers (although these were deferred to later in the month). No. 2 was at this time owned by Coal and Allied Industries, and if the dismissals came into force, only 33 workers would be remain on staff. In resulting discussions, it was proposed instead to bring in production quotas over all collieries, nationalising, conservation, and introducing a 35-hour working week.

By mid-1964 discussions were held about the future of the South Maitland coalfield and specifically, closing the Abermain No. 2. The market for the region's coal was shrinking as one concern.

== Education ==
Public school

The first Abermain Public School was functional by mid-1905, located upon a mining lease in the private township (near Hebburn Road and Montgomery Street; GPS 32.815583°S 151.437278°E). The school was originally a three-room weatherboard cottage provided by the colliery. A contractor commenced building the school in November 1905, and was opened by mid-January 1906 on a small hill on 4 acres (1.6 ha). (Note: The original school near Montgomery Street being on a rise gave name locally to the "Old School Hill".) There was a school room of 33.5 by 22 feet (10.2 m × 6.7 m), and a lobby, and a large back verandah. Totalling £369 8s (equivalent to A$69,800 in 2025), and fenced around, the painted wooden school had an iron roof, with two large ceiling ventilators, and a winter heater and chimney. Concerns however were being expressed that the building should be double the size, where it will cater for 100 students, but there are 180 to 200 children in the area to be accommodated. By May 1906 the school had about 80 students.

The school grew, and by January 1909 the "private township" school was considered very inadequate, and land of a new school should be purchased in the new township (north of the railway line), which should cater for students of both Abermain and Neath. The new public school was opened in November 1909.

By 1926 there were complaints about having up to 89 kindergarten students crowded into one room, along with the heat of summer. The complaints continued into the next year, about the chill of winter, leaking rooves, and buildings never having painted since erected. A new infants' building was approved for construction in August 1927. In 1947 the school concert at the local Star Theatre was well-regarded. The parents and citizens association purchased £100 (equivalent to A$8,440 in 2025) of library books, and a nine-speaker public announcement system. Additional to strong scholastic endeavours, the school had success in athletics, basketball, cricket, football, and vigoro.

Other schools

The Abermain Convent School and Roman Catholic church were erected by October 1904 between Abermain and Weston, being overseen by the Cessnock Convent. The first two teaching sisters travelled daily by horse-drawn bus from Cessnock, for 85 students. Until mid-1920, the Kurri Kurri Convent's Sisters of Saint Joseph teachers were driven every day, until a cottage was purchased to become the Abermain Convent. In 1940 the school was known as the Saint Francis Xavier Church School. By 1961, the school was known as Saint Joseph's Convent School. In 1966, the name again changed to Saint Joseph's Infants School. In 1991 the name changed to the Holy Spirit Infants School.

The Holy Spirit Infants School also supports the Aspect Satellite School Services (for the Aspect Hunter School), which is for students with autism.

== Notable people ==
- Bob Bower (1925–2004), NSW rugby league footballer.
- Robert Endean (1925–1997), marine scientist.
- Jack Gilmore (1894–1958), miner and professional soccer player.
- Les Lumsdon (1912–1977), cartoonist for Newcastle Morning Herald.
- Nick Mitzevich (born 1970), National Gallery of Australia director, Canberra.
- George Neilly (1917–1987), former coal miner at Abermain Colliery, and later member of NSW Legislative Council.
- Stan Neilly (1942–2022; son of George), member of NSW Legislative Assembly.
