= Northumberland County, New South Wales =

Northumberland
- Cadastral division
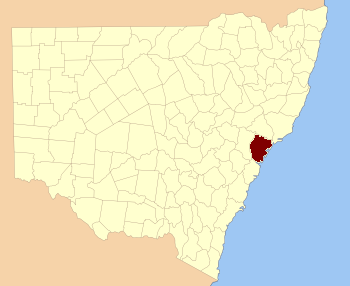
- Location in New South Wales
- Country: Australia
- State: New South Wales
Lands administrative divisions around Northumberland
Hunter	Durham	Gloucester
Hunter	Northumberland	Pacific Ocean
Cook	Cumberland	Pacific Ocean

Northumberland County is one of the original Nineteen Counties in New South Wales, now one of the 141 cadastral divisions of New South Wales. It included the area to the north of Broken Bay, which compasses the Central Coast region and Lake Macquarie as well as Newcastle (Greater Newcastle) in the Hunter region. It was bounded by the part of the Hawkesbury River to the south, the Macdonald River to the south-west, and the Hunter River to the north. Note that Northumberland County should not be confused with the former Northumberland County Council, a county council which existed between 21 July 1948 and 19 December 1963, and which despite the shared name was a legally distinct entity, with a distinct (albeit partially overlapping) territory, the Northumberland county district.

Northumberland County was named after the English Northumberland, and named by Lieutenant Charles Menzies, commandant at Newcastle, about 1804.

In 1852 it had an area of 1,498,060 acres (6,062.4 km^{2}) and population of 15,207, and was described as being 68 miles (109 km) long and 53 miles (85 km) wide and the main coal region of the colony.

== Parishes ==
Northumberland County contains the following parishes:

Parish	LGA	Coordinates	Suburbs
Allandale	Cessnock	32°46′54″S 151°23′04″E	
Alnwick	Maitland	32°44′54″S 151°40′04″E	Beresfield, Tarro, Morpeth
Auburn	Hawkesbury	33°10′54″S 150°56′04″E	
Awaba	Lake Macquarie	33°01′54″S 151°35′04″E	Awaba, Coal Point, Toronto
Bala	Cessnock	33°06′54″S 150°56′04″E	
Belford	Singleton	32°37′54″S 151°17′04″E	Belford
Blaxland	Cessnock	33°01′54″S 151°03′04″E	
Branxton	Cessnock	32°38′54″S 151°22′04″E	Branxton, Greta
Broke	Singleton	32°27′24″S 151°08′04″E	Broke
Burragurra	Cessnock	33°03′54″S 151°00′04″E	
Burton	Singleton	32°51′54″S 150°52′04″E	
Cessnock	Cessnock	32°50′54″S 151°22′04″E	Cessnock, Aberdare
Congewai	Cessnock	32°59′54″S 151°15′04″E	
Coolamin	Cessnock	32°51′54″S 151°08′04″E	
Coorumbung	Lake Macquarie	33°01′54″S 151°30′04″E	Cooranbong, Dora Creek
Corrabare	Cessnock	32°56′24″S 151°11′34″E	Wollombi
Cosgrove	Cessnock	32°57′54″S 150°52′04″E	
Cowan	Central Coast	33°26′54″S 151°12′04″E	Mooney Mooney
Dalton	Singleton	32°49′54″S 150°58′04″E	
Dora	Cessnock	32°59′54″S 151°23′04″E	Martinsville
Eglington	Central Coast	33°15′54″S 151°15′04″E	
Ellalong	Cessnock	32°55′54″S 151°20′04″E	Ellalong
Finchley	Cessnock	32°59′54″S 150°59′04″E	
Gosford	Central Coast	33°22′54″S 151°20′04″E	Gosford, Narara, Niagara Park
Gosforth	Maitland	32°41′54″S 151°29′04″E	Lochinvar, Rutherford, Telarah
Harrowby	Singleton	32°45′54″S 151°03′04″E	
Hay	Cessnock	33°05′54″S 151°11′04″E	
Heddon	Cessnock	32°46′54″S 151°27′04″E	Kurri Kurri, Abermain, Heddon Greta
Hexham	Newcastle	32°50′54″S 151°39′04″E	Hexham, Minmi, Shortland
Kahibah	Lake Macquarie	33°01′54″S 151°40′04″E	Belmont, Cardiff, Charlestown, Glendale, Kahibah, Wallsend
Kincumber	Central Coast	33°26′54″S 151°25′04″E	Erina, Kincumber, Terrigal
Lockyer	Hawkesbury	33°08′54″S 151°02′04″E	
Maitland	Maitland	32°44′54″S 151°35′04″E	Maitland, Ashtonfield, Bolwarra, Tenambit, Metford
Mandolong	Lake Macquarie	33°08′54″S 151°26′04″E	Mandalong
Mangrove	Central Coast	33°22′24″S 151°05′04″E	
Milbrodale	Singleton	32°58′54″S 150°45′04″E	Milbrodale
Millfield	Cessnock	32°48′54″S 151°15′04″E	
Morisset	Lake Macquarie	33°06′54″S 151°30′04″E	Morisset, Sunshine, Wyee
Moruben	Cessnock	33°02′54″S 150°53′04″E	
Mulbring	Cessnock	32°55′54″S 151°28′04″E	Mulbring
Munmorah	Central Coast	33°19′54″S 151°25′04″E	Gorokan, Lake Haven, Warnervale, Wyong
Narara	Central Coast	33°20′54″S 151°22′34″E	Somersby
Newcastle	Newcastle	32°51′54″S 151°43′04″E	Newcastle, Hamilton, Kotara, Mayfield, Waratah
Olney	Central Coast	33°07′54″S 151°20′04″E	
Ourimbah	Central Coast	33°19′54″S 151°20′04″E	Ourimbah
Ovingham	Cessnock	32°45′54″S 151°13′04″E	
Patonga	Central Coast	33°28′54″S 151°15′04″E	Woy Woy, Kariong, Patonga, Point Clare
Pokolbin	Cessnock	32°48′54″S 151°18′04″E	Pokolbin
Popran	Central Coast	33°19′54″S 151°11′04″E	Central Mangrove
Quorrobolong	Cessnock	32°55′54″S 151°22′04″E	Quorrobolong
Rothbury	Cessnock	32°45′54″S 151°18′04″E	Rothbury
Rugby	Central Coast	33°09′54″S 151°09′04″E	
Spencer	Central Coast	33°25′24″S 151°06′04″E	Spencer
St Albans	Hawkesbury	33°18′54″S 151°02′04″E	St Albans
Stanford	Cessnock	32°50′54″S 151°27′04″E	Stanford Merthyr, Kearsley
Stockrington	Cessnock	32°49′54″S 151°34′04″E	Buchanan
Stowe	Central Coast	33°10′54″S 151°14′04″E	Kulnura
Teralba	Lake Macquarie	32°54′54″S 151°34′04″E	Cameron Park, Killingworth, Teralba, Edgeworth
Tuggerah	Central Coast	33°19′54″S 151°30′04″E	Bateau Bay, The Entrance, Tuggerah
Vere	Singleton	32°41′54″S 151°09′04″E	
Wallambine	Hawkesbury	33°13′54″S 151°00′04″E	
Wallarah	Central Coast	33°09′54″S 151°36′04″E	Budgewoi, Caves Beach, Swansea, Toukley
Warkworth	Singleton	32°35′54″S 151°03′04″E	Warkworth
Werong	Singleton	32°54′54″S 150°57′04″E	
Whittingham	Singleton	32°36′54″S 151°10′04″E	Whittingham
Wollombi	Singleton	32°40′54″S 151°04′04″E	
Wyong	Central Coast	33°14′54″S 151°22′04″E	Dooralong, Jilliby
Yango	Cessnock	32°55′54″S 151°05′04″E	
