= Ellalong, New South Wales =

Ellalong
- Town
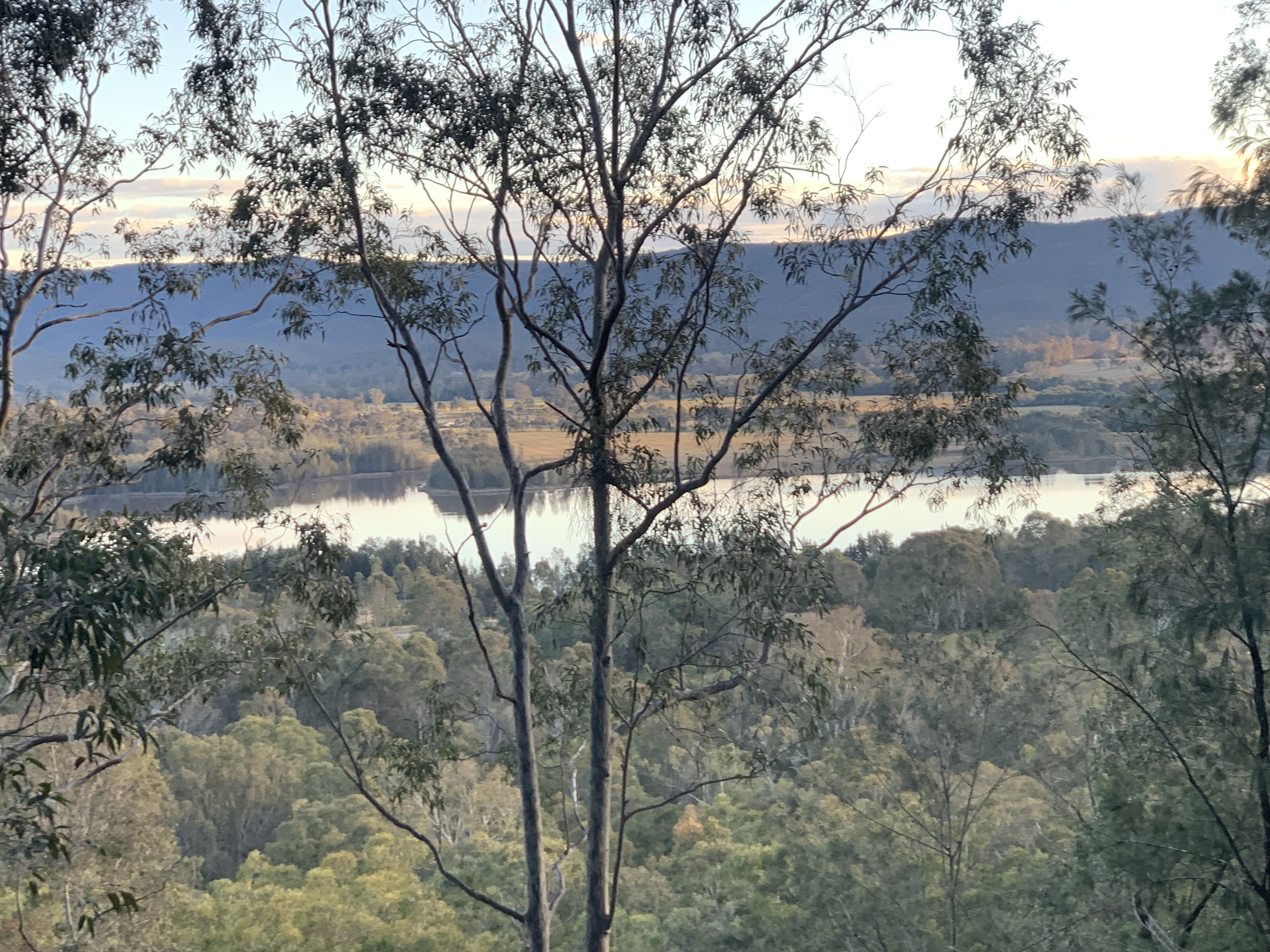
- Ellalong Lagoon

- Coordinates: 32°54′26″S 151°19′17″E
- Country: Australia
- State: New South Wales
- Region: Hunter
- City: Cessnock
- LGA: City of Cessnock
- Location: 155 km (96 mi) N of Sydney; 63 km (39 mi) W of Newcastle; 12 km (7.5 mi) SSW of Cessnock

Government
  - State electorate: Cessnock
  - Federal division: Hunter

Population
  - Total: 1,098 (2016 census)
- Time zone: UTC+10 (AEST)
  - Summer (DST): UTC+11 (AEDT)
- Postcode: 2325
- County: Northumberland
- Parish: Ellalong

Ellalong is a small town located in the Hunter Region of New South Wales, Australia at the foot of the Watagan Mountains. It is south-west of Cessnock, and has neighbouring towns including Pelton (to the north), Paxton (to the west), Congewai and Quorrobolong (to the east).

At the 2016 census, the Ellalong township had a population of 1098.

The town name is from a First Nations language referring to a swampy place.

== History ==
Ellalong Public School in the County of Northumberland was established in June 1863 and closed in December 1863. Ellalong Public School re-opened in 1868.

In October 1889, a concert and ball was held at William Snape's Hall.

The Ellalong colliery, established about 1908, was incorporated into Southland colliery, and in 2004 was renamed as the Austar coal mine.

In 1922, land sales occurred, in preparation to support the two large nearby collieries, as well as the Stanford-Merthyr No. 2 colliery at Paxton. On Thursday 27 April 1922 the first passenger train arrived at Ellalong, with an engine, one carriage, and 23 passengers.

The Ellalong Hotel was built specifically in the mining boom in 1924. The previous year, supported by the proprietor of the existing Ellalong wine bar, the hotel licence was approved for the proposed site, providing the building was erected within twelve months. At this point the nearest hotel was in Cessnock, and it was argued the village needed one because of the mine. The £7500 (equivalent to A$752,500 in 2025) building was to have fourteen bedrooms, four bathrooms, two parlours, two sitting rooms, dining room, kitchen, out-buildings, and a public bar.

In mid-1926 saw the start of concerted effort by the School of Arts Committee towards constructing a building. The land was on the main street of Ellalong.

In 1937, consideration was being given to electricity (for lighting) being provided to the town by the Caledonia Collieries Limited.

The December 1945 school concert was considered a success, although lighting issues were resolved by loaned miner lamps, and the spotlight powered by a car battery. The following parents and citizens association picnic and dance raised money towards a wireless set (radio) and a library.

In 1948 another colliery near the lagoon was proposed, as well as an electrical power station.

== Population ==
In the 2016 census, there were 1,098 people in Ellalong. 83.3% of people were born in Australia and 90.9% of people spoke only English at home. The most common responses for religion were: no religion 30.7%, Anglican 28.8% and Catholic 15.4%. The median age was 39-years-old. 535 were male and 560 were female.

== Ellalong Lagoon ==
The village is home to a large lagoon that is of Aboriginal cultural significance. The Ellalong Lagoon is a mythical site known as "Catch-a-boy Swamp", where a bunyip is said to have lived and taken a young boy who was swimming or playing in the lagoon. Parents would use the story to reinforce the danger to their children of playing in the lagoon. Locals that grew up in the area were well aware of the myth, but would still swim in the swamp in the summer months, often trying to scare each other with stories of the bunyip.

When full, the lagoon is a picturesque site but will at times completely dry up with drought. The Quorrobolong Creek section of the swamp can be viewed from the front of the Ellalong Hotel also overlooking the Watagan Mountains.

== 1994 earthquake ==
Ellalong was the epicentre of an earthquake recorded as magnitude 5.4 at 9:04 am, Saturday, 6 August 1994. Five people in the Hunter region were injured and 1000 homes damaged in this earthquake. The quake was the biggest in the region since the 1989 Newcastle earthquake. Seventeen miners in the Ellalong Colliery's No. 2 shaft 550 metres (1,800 ft) underground were trapped for about 45 minutes, enduring two minutes of aftershock. There was a loss of power, which meant loss of lighting and a loss of ventilation by the fans; whilst the shocks meant everything was covered in dust.
