= Pelton, New South Wales =

Pelton
- Suburb
- Coordinates: 32°52′45″S 151°18′41″E
- Country: Australia
- State: New South Wales
- Region: Hunter
- City: Cessnock
- LGA: City of Cessnock

Government
  - State electorate: Cessnock
  - Federal division: Hunter

Population
  - Total: 82 (SAL 2021)
- Postcode: 2325
Suburbs around Pelton
		Cessnock
Millfield	Pelton	Kitchener
Paxton	Ellalong	Quorrobolong

Pelton is a suburb located 5 kilometres (3.1 mi) southwest of the centre of the Hunter Region town of Cessnock, New South Wales, Australia.

Most properties face onto Ellalong Road, which is the eastern access to Werakata State Conservation Area, previously Aberdare State Forest.

The Pelton Colliery became part of the Austar coal mine holdings.
