= Paxton, New South Wales =

Paxton
- Suburb
- Coordinates: 32°54′8″S 151°16′48″E
- Country: Australia
- State: New South Wales
- LGA: City of Cessnock

Government
  - State electorate: Cessnock
  - Federal division: Hunter

Population
  - Total: 1,215 (2021 census)
- Postcode: 2325

Paxton is a village in the Hunter Region of New South Wales, Australia. It is about 10.5 kilometres (6.5 mi) from Cessnock.

Whilst coal was discovered in 1856 in the district, it was not until government assistant geological surveyor Edgeworth David mapped the field in 1886 that the size and commercial potential of the South Maitland coalfields became known. The first colliery was opened in 1891 at East Greta.

The advent of mining to the location saw the creation of "the new model township in the heart of the coalfields", "destined to become another Cessnock", and "this most attracting township", with 119 residential and business sites. It was a terminus for the South Maitland Railway.

Streets are named for colliery company officials. Two large lot residential subdivisions have been built afterwards.

== Colliery ==
The Stanford Merthyr No. 2 Colliery (GPS 32.9045°S 151.2787°E) also known as the Stanford Main No. 2 Colliery also known as the Paxton Colliery was a coal mine located at Paxton and opened by September 1922.

Note: Stanford Merthyr No. 1 Colliery and the Stanford Merthyr township are about 21.5 kilometres (13.4 mi) NEE of Paxton, near Kurri Kurri.

The mine was started by the East Greta Coal Mining Company, and later, J & A Brown and Abermain-Seaham Collieries Limited, then in the 1960 merger, Coal & Allied. Estimated at 10,000 acres (4,047 ha) and advertised as "said to be one of the largest areas in the world operated on by one pit", the Greta coal seam has been mined using board and pillar mining methods. The coal seam was located at a depth of 335 feet (102 m). Coal was transported from the mine via the Paxton Branch of the South Maitland Railway. The mine was named Stanford Merthyr No. 2 until 1 May 1931.

In July 1923 a licence was sought to create a hotel – rather than a boarding house – at Millfield and Hall Streets, of fourteen bedrooms, four bathrooms, three sitting rooms, dining room, and a public bar; a brick building upon concrete foundations, costing £7000 (equivalent to A$702,400 in 2025). The design would also allow miners to change clothes before entering the hotel. Many witnesses supported the application including the mine managers, the Paxton Progress Association, and two miners' lodges, who indicated:

- Charles Earp, chair of the East Greta Coal Mining Company, and managing director of the South Maitland Railways Limited, would attend Paxton regularly but there was no hotel, nor meals readily available; as did Henry Williams, the collieries superintendent who visited twice a week; and the mine manager Stanley Sawyer has been sleeping in the colliery office for the last two years;
- building erection in the town and the colliery was hampered as bricklayers had a lack of accommodation, and the nearest hotel was at Bellbird, 5 miles (8.0 km) away;
- hotels were better than boarding houses as they were under police supervision;
- the present population of Paxton was 280 persons, with surrounding areas of Ellalong at 270, Millfield 120, and Congewait, 141;
- 100 men presently employed in the colliery, and in a few years, there would be 600; and
- coal production was 30 tons a day, but in two years, this should be 16,000 tons a day.

The licence was conditionally granted. At the time, one person had erected some portable two-room houses on that person's block, charged out at 10 shillings (equivalent to A$50 in 2025) per week.

In October 1925 for at least three months, miners went on strike because of the installation of safety lamps where "it is more difficult to work with the light of a safety lamp, and that the increase of sixpence would compensate them for the loss of wages, as their daily output would be reduced". This was also occurring at the Rothbury colliery. At this time, Stanford Merthyr No. 2 miners were being paid four shillings and sixpence per ton (equivalent to A$22.25 in 2025), the highest rate on the coalfield along with Hebburn No. 2 colliery (a sixpence alone was the equivalent to A$2.45 in 2025). Management estimated the loss of wages to the miners was about £50,000 (equivalent to A$4.94M in 2025).

In September 1930, 100 of the 200 men employed at the colliery were cavilled out (made redundant), reducing the numbers of miners, wheelers, underground off-hands, shot-firers, first-class shift men, and second-class shift men.

In November 1933, as a result of persistent stop-work meetings, where for the past months the workers were taking a day off a week for meetings, the colliery was closed down indefinitely and 250 men terminated. The mine was reopened in May 1934, with all but 20 men re-engaged.

By May 1940, at the start of World War II, the Federated Engine-drivers and Firemen's Association was seeking a four-hour day for the winding engine-drivers who hauled the coal, which the chief judge said "was an insult to a man's intelligence". One driver stated the Stanford Merthyr No. 2 working conditions were the worst on the field, "From whistle to whistle we are standing on practically one leg, with the right leg using the footbrake".

The mine closed in 1961.

Today

The Austar coal mine is located nearby, to the NNE at Pelton.

== Facilities ==
In 2016, Paxton has a bowling club, general store, public hotel, post office, a tennis complex, and a fire station.

== Heritage ==
Heritage-listed buildings include the hotel, masonic hall, and public school.

In 1989, scheduled as items of state environment heritage as part of the Hunter Regional Environmental Plan 1989, "Stanford Main No. 2 Colliery (includes cottages/equipment)". Today there still stands a pit-head tower and chimney, the pay office, and a 1950s bathhouse.
