= 1923 Bellbird Mining Disaster =

Mining disaster in New South Wales, Australia

- Date: 1 September 1923
- Time: 13:00
- Location: Bellbird, New South Wales
- Type: Coal mine disaster
- Deaths: 21
- Inquiries: Two coronial inquests and a Royal Commission
- Inquest: 1925–1926 Royal Commission
- Coroner: George Brown (Cessnock Coroner)

The 1923 Bellbird Mining Disaster took place on 1 September 1923 when there was a fire at Hetton-Bellbird coal mine, known locally as the Bellbird Colliery or mine. The coal mine was located near the village of Bellbird, which is itself three miles southwest of Cessnock in the Northern coalfields of New South Wales, Australia. The accident occurred in the No. 1 Workings of the mine and resulted in the deaths of 21 miners and their horses. At the time of the disaster the mine employed 538 people including 369 who worked underground.

The disaster prompted a thorough investigation into the causes of the accident, which resulted in legislative changes that were implemented in an effort to improve worker safety in Australian coal mines. These efforts culminated with the Mines Rescue Act 1925 which established standards for mine rescue operations in New South Wales.

== Background ==
The Bellbird Colliery was owned by the Hetton Coal Company. Two initial tunnels were constructed in 1908 and were referred to as No. 1 Mine. Two additional tunnels were completed in 1918 were worked as No. 2 Mine. Locally, it was known as the Bellbird mine. Coal from Bellbird mine was first sent to market in 1912 and at the time of the disaster, more than 600 people were employed there, more than 400 underground. By 1922 it was producing around 1,700 tons of bituminous coal daily, making Bellbird a medium output mine compared to other mines in NSW.

Despite having a reputation as a relatively safe mine, there had been seven fatalities between 1917 and 1923. The mine was worked with naked lights, except for when inspections were carried out with safety lamps.

Prior to the disaster, the mine was not worked during May, June or July due to strike action known as the "Major Crane Strike".

== Incident ==
At 1:00 pm on 1 September 1923 twenty men entered the colliery for their shift. Deputies Eke, Sneddon and Wilson from the day shift were in the mine conducting inspections as a part of the shift handover. At 1:30 pm the inspection was finished and they went to No. 4 West Flat. The fire occurred shortly after 1:30 pm. The deputies went to No. 3 where they found smoke and flames in the air return tunnel. At 2:00 pm an explosion occurred. At 4:00 pm they decided to recover bodies and seal the mine without knowing the source of the fire. Sealing of the mine commenced at 9:30 pm and completed by 1:00 pm the next day. This caused six men to be entombed inside the pit. Four tunnels were sealed with sand, soil and timber followed by upcast shaft. There were seven separate underground explosions. At 1:45 pm on 2 September 1923 an explosion burst through the seal in the tunnel near killing two volunteers. The manager called the colliery office four times without a response and failed to inform worker of the fire or smoke.

== Investigation ==
A coronial inquest and a Royal Commission were conducted. The inquest was held over nine days from 4 September to 4 October by coroner George Brown at the Cessnock Court House which included a jury of six people and forty-two witnesses. The first jury verdict was inconclusive, finding that the deceased met their deaths from carbon monoxide poisoning which was caused by either a fire or explosion yet “there was no evidence to show how such fire of explosion was caused”. They found that the evidence did not provide definitely how the disaster originated. They also stressed that the great weight of evidence shows that the mine was a safe one but that such an accident could occur in any mine in the local coalfields justifying the need for a central rescue station. Jury further argued the need for more strict regulations governing safety in the coal mines of NSW.

A second inquest was held by George Brown on 20 May 1925. This new inquest yielded very little new information to add to the findings of the original inquest but emphasised the possibility that the fire was caused by employee negligence. Regardless of the causes of the disaster, the recommendations to avoid a repeat of its aftermath were the same. Further safety standards were needed and trained professionals in centrally located rescue stations. Both were recognised as vital for future coal mining safety. A report into the incident found unsafe work practices including smoking in the mines, unreliable emergency phone lines and lack of hazard reduction and reporting. The inquest revealed that some workers did not have safety lamps.

The NSW government resisted calls for a Royal Commission, despite persistent lobbying by the Miner's Federation which threatened strike action. It was not until the election of the Lang Labor government in 1925 that a broad-ranging Royal Commission into general coal mine safety was set up, charged with "reporting on the best methods of working the state's coal seams compatible with miners' safety". Some of the report's recommendations were incorporated into the Mines Regulation (Amendment) Act 1926. Jack Baddeley, member for Newcastle, was the Labor Minister of Mines during this period. The commission was chaired by Justice Edmunds.

== Cause ==
The explosion was caused by methane gas build up which was caused by dust being constantly pushed and reacting to the air. The explosions were caused by the distillation of coal gas within overheated coals heaps which ignited the gas. The explosions spread the fire. There was evidence of heating within heaps of fallen coal which caused the spontaneous combustion. The use of naked lights through the mine was considered to be the cause of the fire. There have been three probable fires of the fire ignition of firedamp or other inflammable gas to contract with naked flame, ignition of coal dust by flame due to overcharged shot or ignition of inflammable gases produced and subsequently ignited by active mine fires.

== Deaths ==
All twenty-one deaths were caused by carbon monoxide poisoning. Many miners died due to being choked by gas. One of the deaths was John B. Brown who was the manager of the Aberdare Colliery who died while helping the rescue effort. Two bodies were found just inside No. 9 West with a further nine bodies and three were found outside the colliery. A man and a horse were found inside No. 8 West.

== Aftermath ==
Much of the mining equipment including saw machinery and coal skips were destroyed. After three weeks No. 2 Working was reopened due to the lack of damage.

The disaster caused a debate about the flow of consistent ventilation in mines. Stone dusting was implemented to reduce the dangers of coal dust. The disaster created a greater public awareness of mining safety, the need for emergency equipment and trained emergency and rescue officers. After the disaster all sources of light were replaced with safety lamps.

On 3 September a funeral was held in Cessnock which thousands attended. Hundred of miners "marched in honour of their dead comrades". A monument was placed in a memorial park near the site of the Bellbird Colliery listing the names of 21 men who lost their lives. Bellbird Tidy Town and Austar completed a restoration of the disaster site. The Miners Federation started a campaign to increase regulations as they believed the accident was preventable.

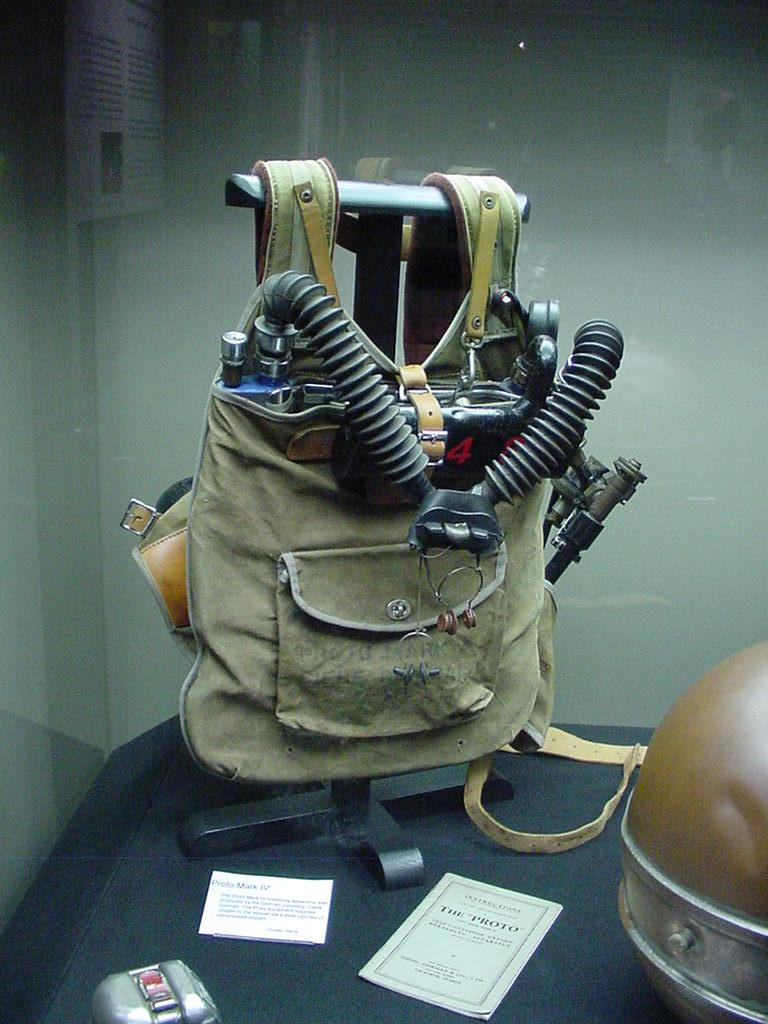
A Proto breathing apparatus used by volunteers during recovery efforts

In 1924 a group of trained volunteer rescue teams using Proto breathing apparatus recovered the six bodies entombed in the pit. Breathing apparatus have been used in several incidents with increased confidence in their use led to reentry of operation of mines.

The disaster saw a major revision of 1912 NSW Act which was enacted in 1926 which included additional regulations on explosives, safety lamps and power of inspectors. The Bellbird disaster was certainly significant, for it influenced the eventual passage of the Mines Rescue Act 1925 by the New South Wales Parliament. It was given wide coverage in the press including detailed accounts of the lengthy inquest proceedings. This tended to increase public awareness of and sensitivity to the issues, and highlighted the hazardous nature of coal mining. The value of equipment in the hands of trained personnel was clearly demonstrated. Subsequently momentum for the introduction of the facilities grew and a consensus developed. It took most of the legislative year but by 31 December 1925 the bill that became operation provided for the establishment of an organised mines rescue system in NSW coal mines. Central mines rescue stations were to be set up in four defined districts and rescue brigades installed at certain mines where there was no permanent rescue corps locally. Each of these stations were to be manned by full-trained specialists to assist in rescue operations. While in real terms the disaster was perhaps more important in its response than in its cause. The importance of trained rescue teams using professional equipment became easily apparent and enshrined in safety legislation. This incident, being the latest in a long string of fatal mining accidents, is considered a prime catalyst for the ultimate passage of the Mines Rescue Act 1925 which still governs over rescue operation standards in NSW today. This legislation required the establishment of rescue stations and Brigadesmen teams as well as instigating new standards regarding both equipment and maintenance.

== See also ==
- Coal mining disasters in Australia
- Stanford Merthyr Colliery 1905 fire and explosion
