= City of Cessnock =

- Local government area
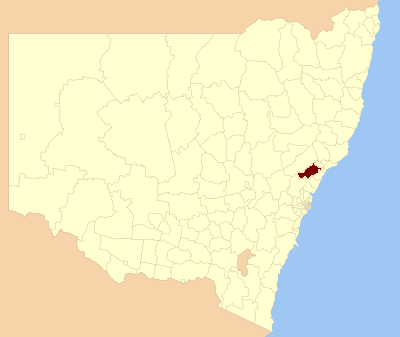
- Location in New South Wales

- Interactive map of City of Cessnock
- Coordinates: 32°50′S 151°21′E
- Country: Australia
- State: New South Wales
- Region: Hunter (Greater Newcastle)
- City: Cessnock
- Location: 154 km (96 mi) N of Sydney; 52 km (32 mi) W of Newcastle
- Established: 7 March 1906 (as Cessnock Shire)
- Council seat: Cessnock

Government
  - Mayor: Daniel Watton
  - State electorate: Cessnock
  - Federal division: Hunter

Area
  - Total: 1,966 km^{2} (759 sq mi)

Population
  - Totals: 63,632 (2021 census); 59,101 (2018 est.)
  - Density: 32.366/km^{2} (83.828/sq mi)
- Time zone: UTC+10 (AEST)
  - Summer (DST): UTC+11 (AEDT)
- Postcode: 2320-2327, 2330, 2334, 2335
- Website: City of Cessnock
LGAs around City of Cessnock
Singleton	Maitland & Singleton	Maitland
Singleton	City of Cessnock	Newcastle
Hawkesbury	Hawkesbury	Central Coast & Lake Macquarie

The City of Cessnock is a local government area in the Hunter region of New South Wales, Australia. The area under administration is located to the west of Newcastle. The largest population centre and council seat is the city of Cessnock.

The mayor of the City of Cessnock Council is Cr. Daniel Watton, an independent. City of Cessnock - Mayoral Election results.

== Main towns and villages ==
The Cessnock City Council area includes:

- Cessnock
- Kurri Kurri
- Weston
- Pelaw Main
- Abermain
- Aberdare
- Bellbird
- Kearsley
- Mulbring
- Kitchener
- Paxton
- Millfield
- Ellalong
- Wollombi
- Neath
- Branxton
- Greta

== Demographics ==
At the 2011 census, there were 50,840 people in the City of Cessnock local government area, of these 49.7 per cent were male and 50.3 per cent were female. Aboriginal and Torres Strait Islander people made up 4.8 per cent of the population, which was nearly double than the national and state averages of 2.5 per cent. The median age of people in the City of Cessnock was 37 years, equal to the national median. Children aged 0 – 14 years made up 21.4 per cent of the population and people aged 65 years and over made up 14.1 per cent of the population. Of people in the area aged 15 years and over, 46.6 per cent were married and 13.2 per cent were either divorced or separated.

Population growth in the City of Cessnock between the 2001 census and the 2006 census was 2.52 per cent; and in the subsequent five years to the 2011 census, population growth was 10.03 per cent. When compared with total population growth of Australia for the same periods, being 5.78 per cent and 8.32 per cent respectively, population growth in the City of Cessnock local government area was approximately equal to the national average over the ten-year period. The median weekly income for residents within the City of Cessnock was lower than the national average.

At the 2011 census, the proportion of residents in the City of Cessnock local government area who stated their ancestry as Australian or Anglo-Celtic exceeded 83 per cent of all residents (national average was 65.2 per cent). In excess of 64% of all residents in the City of Cessnock nominated a religious affiliation with Christianity at the 2011 census, which was significantly higher than the national average of 50.2 per cent. Meanwhile, as at the census date, compared to the national average, households in the City of Cessnock local government area had a significantly lower than average proportion (3.1 per cent) where two or more languages are spoken (national average was 20.4 per cent); and a significantly higher proportion (93.0 per cent) where English only was spoken at home (national average was 76.8 per cent).

Selected historical census data for the City of Cessnock local government area
Census year		2001	2006	2011	2016	2021
Population	Estimated residents on census night	45,071	▲46,206	▲50,840	▲55,560	▲63,632
Population	LGA rank in terms of size within New South Wales			43rd	▲42nd	▲40th
Population	% of New South Wales population			0.73%	▲0.74%	▲0.79%
Population	% of Australian population	0.24%	▼0.23%	▲0.24%	0.24%	▲0.25%
Cultural and language diversity						
Ancestry, top responses	Australian			35.3%	▼34.9%	▲44.7%
Ancestry, top responses	English			32.2%	▼31.7%	▲42.2%
Ancestry, top responses	Scottish			8.4%	8.4%	▲11.5%
Ancestry, top responses	Australian Aboriginal			n/c	n/c	▲9.1%
Ancestry, top responses	Irish			7.1%	▲7.2%	▲9.0%
Language, top responses (other than English)	Thai	n/c	n/c	n/c	▲0.1%	▲0.2%
Language, top responses (other than English)	Tagalog	0.1%	▼ n/c	▲0.1%	0.1%	▲0.2%
Language, top responses (other than English)	Spanish	n/c	n/c	n/c	▲0.1%	0.1%
Language, top responses (other than English)	Vietnamese	n/c	n/c	n/c	n/c	▲0.1%
Language, top responses (other than English)	Mandarin	n/c	▲0.1%	▼ n/c	n/c	▲0.1%
Religious affiliation						
Religious affiliation, top responses	No Religion	11.0%	▲14.5%	▲18.5%	▲25.8%	▲41.1%
Religious affiliation, top responses	Anglican	33.6%	▼33.0%	▼31.1%	▼26.5%	▼19.2%
Religious affiliation, top responses	Catholic	22.2%	▼21.9%	21.9%	▼20.2%	▼17.7%
Religious affiliation, top responses	Not stated	n/c	n/c	n/c	▲10.7%	▼8.2%
Religious affiliation, top responses	Uniting Church	9.9%	▼8.5%	▼7.4%	▼5.4%	▼3.7%
Median weekly incomes						
Personal income	Median weekly personal income		A$358	A$472	A$540	A$696
Personal income	% of Australian median income		76.8%	▲81.8%	▼81.6%	▲86.5%
Family income	Median weekly family income		A$1,015	A$1,265	A$1,414	A$1,818
Family income	% of Australian median income		86.7%	▼85.4%	▼81.5%	▲85.8%
Household income	Median weekly household income		A$786	A$1,042	A$1,177	A$1,493
Household income	% of Australian median income		76.5%	▲84.4%	▼81.8%	▲85.5%

== Council ==
=== Current composition and election method ===
Cessnock City Council is composed of thirteen councillors, including the mayor, for a fixed four-year term of office. The mayor is directly elected while the twelve other councillors are elected proportionally as four separate wards, each electing three councillors. The most recent election was held on 4 December 2021, and the makeup of the council, including the mayor, is as follows:

Party	Councillors
Labor	6
Liberal Party	3
Independent	4
Total	13

The current Council, elected in 2021, in order of election by ward, is:

Ward	Councillor	Party	Notes
Mayor	Jay Suvaal	Labor	
A Ward	Jessica Jurd	Independent	
A Ward	James Hawkins	Labor	
A Ward	Paul Dunn	Liberal	
B Ward	Ian Olsen	Independent	
B Ward	Anthony Burke	Labor	
B Ward	John Moores	Liberal	
C Ward	Anne-Marie Sander	Labor	
C Ward	Karen Jackson	Liberal	
C Ward	Daniel Watton	Independent	
D Ward	Rosa Grine	Labor	
D Ward	Mitchell Hill	Labor	
D Ward	Paul Paynter	Independent	

== Election results ==
=== 2024 ===
2024 New South Wales local elections: Cessnock
Party	Votes	%	Swing	Seats	Change
Cessnock Independents	16,245	42.43	+17.4	5	▲1
Labor	15,563	40.65	−1.8	6	▲1
Independents	4,008	10.47	+9.4	1	▲1
Animal Justice	1,393	3.64	+3.6	0	Steady
Greens	1,080	2.82	−7.1	0	Steady
Formal votes	38,289	90.75	−3.24		
Informal votes	3,905	9.25	+3.24		
Total	42,194	100.00			

=== 2021 ===
2021 New South Wales local elections: Cessnock
Party	Votes	%	Swing	Seats	Change
Labor	15,136	42.5	−6.2	5	▼2
Olsen Independents	8,908	25.0	+18.7	4	▲3
Liberal	7,676	21.6	−0.9	3	Steady
Greens	3,509	9.9	+2.8	0	Steady
Independent	389	1.1		0	▼1
Formal votes	35,618	93.99			
Informal votes	2,274	6.01			
Total	37,892	100.00			

== See also ==
- List of local government areas in New South Wales
