= Aberdare, New South Wales =

Aberdare
- Suburb
- Interactive map of Aberdare
- Coordinates: 32°50′24″S 151°22′48″E
- Country: Australia
- State: New South Wales
- Region: Hunter
- City: Cessnock
- LGA: Cessnock
- Location: 2.3 km (1.4 mi) ESE of Cessnock; 48.2 km (30.0 mi) WNW of Newcastle; 153 km (95 mi) N of Sydney
- Established: 1904

Government
  - State electorate: Cessnock
  - Federal division: Hunter

Area
  - Total: 3.2961 km^{2} (1.2726 sq mi)
- Elevation: 86.5 m (284 ft)

Population
  - Total: 2,542 (2021 census)
  - Density: 771.21/km^{2} (1,997.4/sq mi)
- Time zone: UTC+10 (AEST)
  - Summer (DST): UTC+11 (AEDT)
- Postcode: 2325
- County: Northumberland
- Parish: Cessnock
- Gazetted: 14 October 1905 (town); 5 September 1975 (town); 23 October 2015 (locality)
- Mean max temp: 24.2 °C (75.6 °F)
- Mean min temp: 10.5 °C (50.9 °F)
- Annual rainfall: 743.3 mm (29.26 in)
Suburbs around Aberdare
Cessnock	Cessnock	Neath
Cessnock	Aberdare	Kearsley
Cessnock	Cessnock	Kearsley

Aberdare is a suburb of Cessnock, a large town based on coal mining in the Lower Hunter Region, New South Wales, Australia. Aberdare is a small suburb just 15 minutes from wine country, 45 minutes from Newcastle and two hours from Sydney. George Brown found coal in the area in 1800s. Coal mining created the land boom of 1903-23 and by 1926 Cessnock had a population of 12,000 within a 1,600 m (1 mi) radius.

== Heritage Listing ==
Aberdare Central Colliery Company Houses on 33, 37, and 41-47 Cessnock Street.
