= Neath, New South Wales =

Village in New South Wales

Neath Cessnock, New South Wales
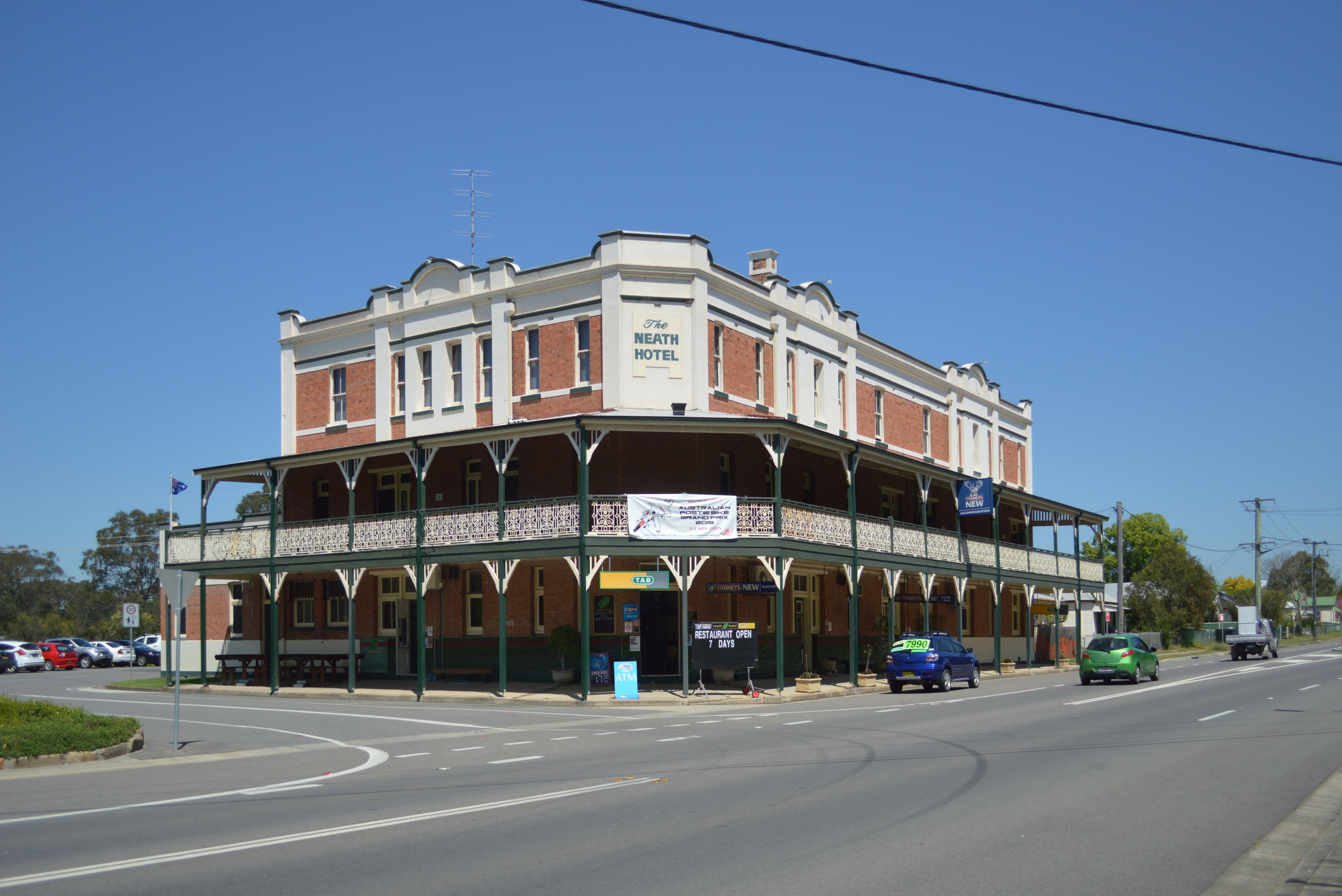
- The heritage Neath Hotel, pictured in 2015.

- Coordinates: 32°49′38″S 151°24′38″E
- Population: 430 (2021)
- Established: 1900s
- Postcode(s): 2326
- State electorate(s): Cessnock
- Federal division(s): Hunter
Localities around Neath:
		Abermain
Cessnock	Neath

Neath is a village in New South Wales, Australia, west of Newcastle. There was originally a coal mine, built in 1906, but the mine closed in 1951 and passenger rail service to the village ended not long after. In 2021, the village recorded a population of 430, down from 490 in 2016.

== Census statistics ==
Historical census data for Neath
Year	Pop.	±%
2001	355	—
2006	387	+9.0%
2011	432	+11.6%
2016	490	+13.4%
2021	430	−12.2%

In 2021, the village had a recorded population of 430 people in 116 families and 215 private dwellings. The average family with children had 1.7 children. The median age was 55. There were an average of 2.1 people and 1.7 motor vehicles per household. The median weekly household income was A$792, compared to A$1,746 nationally. 21 people (13.7%) were unemployed, compared to 5.1% nationally.

The majority (90.9%) of people only spoke English at home. Other languages were Tok Pisin (three speakers), German (also three speakers), and pidgin (five). 61.5% of people were Christian, and 33.7% reported no religion. Australia was people's primary country of birth (84.7%) followed distantly by England (3.3%).

== History ==
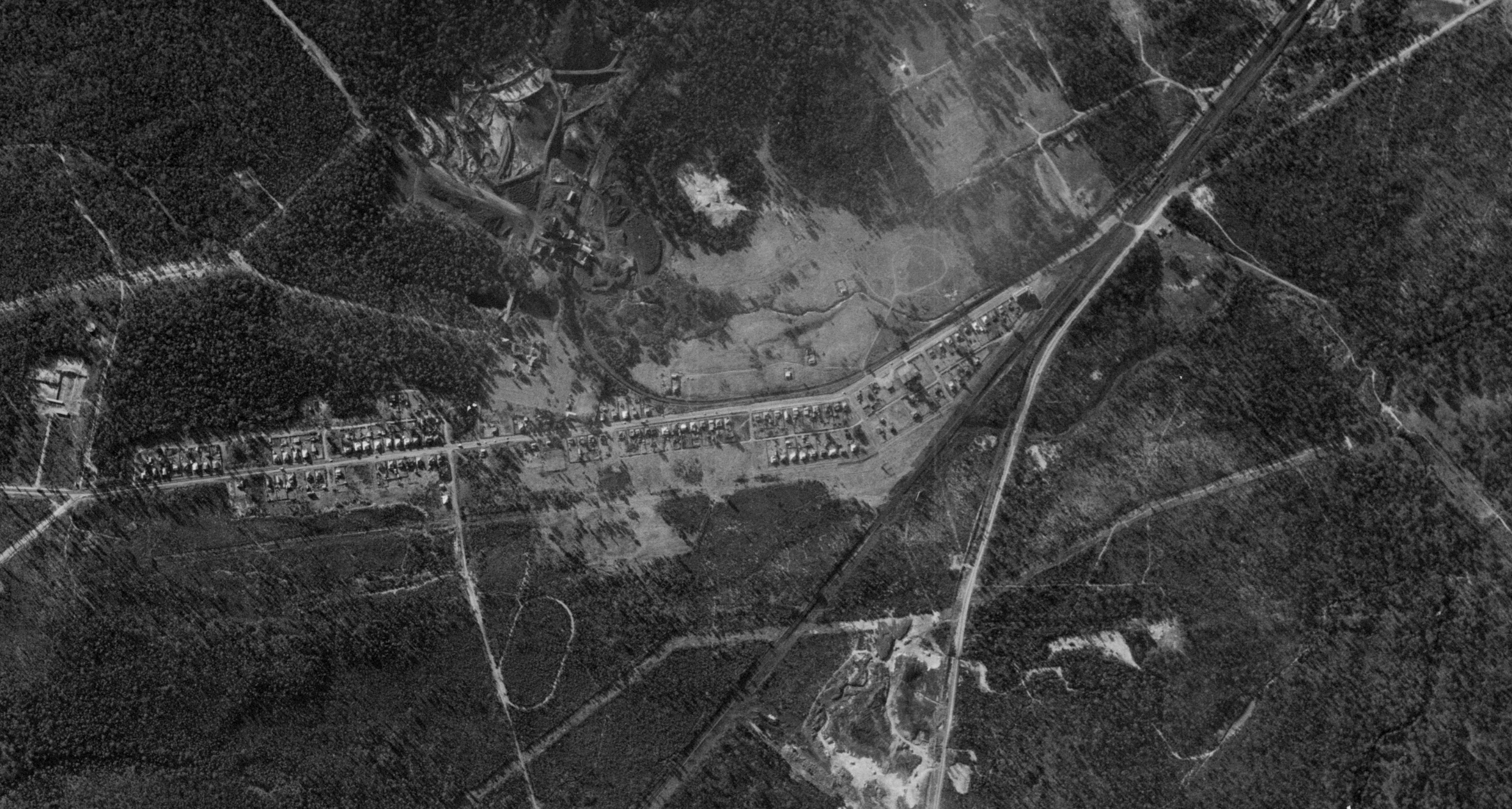
Aerial view of the village in July 1970.

The village shares its name with Neath, a town in Wales.

The founding of the village is linked to the opening of a coal mine, Neath Colliery, in 1906. When a railway line was extended to connect Abermain and Cessnock, a station was opened in Neath in 1908. The coal mine closed in 1951 and the rail station shut down operations sixteen years later; the mine's buildings were destroyed in the 1980s. The Neath Hotel, built in 1914, still stands, as does the platform for the railway station and a signal box.

== Geography ==
Neath lies south-west and very near to Abermain. The town of Cessnock is 5 kilometres (3.1 mi) to the west. Road B68 connects the three settlements.

The village is surrounded by bushland and slopes from east to west.

=== Geology ===
Neath sits on the Branxton formation – a mixture of conglomerate, sandstone, and siltstone dating back to middle Permian. There is a coal seam nearby.

== Politics ==
Neath is in the City of Cessnock local government area, where it is on the eastern edge of Ward B. The village is represented in the New South Wales Legislative Assembly by the electoral district of Cessnock. Federally, it lies in the division of Hunter.

=== Services ===
There is no post office in Neath. The closest post office is in Weston, and there is a posting box in Abermain.

Neath is served by Abermain Public School at the primary level and by Cessnock High School at the secondary level.

== Climate ==
Neath has a humid subtropical climate (Cfa).
