= List of schools in the Hunter and Central Coast =

This is a list of schools in the Hunter and Central Coast regions of New South Wales, Australia. The New South Wales education system traditionally consists of primary schools, which accommodate students from Kindergarten to Year 6 (ages 5–12), and high schools, which accommodate students from Years 7 to 12 (ages 12–18).

== Public schools ==
=== Primary schools (K–6) ===
Name	Suburb	LGA	Opened
Aberdeen Public School	Aberdeen	Upper Hunter	1864
Abermain Public School	Abermain	Cessnock	1905
Adamstown Public School	Adamstown	Newcastle	1877
Anna Bay Public School	Anna Bay	Port Stephens	1879
Arcadia Vale Public School	Arcadia Vale	Lake Macquarie	1958
Argenton Public School	Argenton	Lake Macquarie	1951
Ashtonfield Public School	Ashtonfield	Maitland	2007
Avoca Beach Public School	Avoca Beach	Central Coast	1935
Awaba Public School	Awaba	Lake Macquarie	1891
Barnsley Public School	Barnsley	Lake Macquarie	1865
Bateau Bay Public School	Bateau Bay	Central Coast	1980
Belair Public School	Adamstown Heights	Newcastle	1968
Bellbird Public School	Bellbird	Cessnock	1913
Belltrees Public School	Belltrees	Upper Hunter	1876
Belmont North Public School	Belmont North	Lake Macquarie	1953
Belmont Public School	Belmont	Lake Macquarie	1874
Beresfield Public School	Beresfield	Newcastle	1883
Berkeley Vale Public School	Berkeley Vale	Central Coast	1915
Biddabah Public School	Warners Bay	Lake Macquarie	1959
Biraban Public School	Toronto	Lake Macquarie	1956
Black Hill Public School	Black Hill	Cessnock	1881
Blackalls Park Public School	Blackalls Park	Lake Macquarie	1953
Blacksmiths Public School	Blacksmiths	Lake Macquarie	1962
Blandford Public School	Blandford	Upper Hunter	1871
Blue Haven Public School	Blue Haven	Central Coast	1999
Bobs Farm Public School	Bobs Farm	Port Stephens	1918
Bolwarra Public School	Bolwarra	Maitland	1852
Bonnells Bay Public School	Bonnells Bay	Lake Macquarie	1912
Boolaroo Public School	Boolaroo	Lake Macquarie	1900
Booragul Public School	Booragul	Lake Macquarie	1955
Booral Public School	Booral	Mid-Coast	1865
Branxton Public School	Branxton	Cessnock	1863
Brisbania Public School	Saratoga	Central Coast	1941
Broke Public School	Broke	Singleton	1871
Brooke Avenue Public School	Killarney Vale	Central Coast	1985
Budgewoi Public School	Budgewoi	Central Coast	1961
Cardiff North Public School	Cardiff	Lake Macquarie	1956
Cardiff Public School	Cardiff	Lake Macquarie	1891
Cardiff South Public School	Cardiff South	Lake Macquarie	1952
Carrington Public School	Carrington	Newcastle	1873
Cassilis Public School	Cassilis	Upper Hunter	1875
Caves Beach Public School	Caves Beach	Lake Macquarie	1968
Central Mangrove Public School	Central Mangrove	Central Coast	1957
Cessnock East Public School	Cessnock	Cessnock	1928
Cessnock Public School	Cessnock	Cessnock	1859
Cessnock West Public School	Cessnock	Cessnock	1920
Charlestown East Public School	Charlestown	Lake Macquarie	1959
Charlestown Public School	Charlestown	Lake Macquarie	1879
Charlestown South Public School	Charlestown	Lake Macquarie	1963
Chertsey Primary School	Springfield	Central Coast	1969
Chittaway Bay Public School	Chittaway Bay	Central Coast	1982
Clarence Town Public School	Clarence Town	Dungog	1849
Coal Point Public School	Coal Point	Lake Macquarie	1955
Congewai Public School	Congewai	Cessnock	1888
Cooranbong Community School	Cooranbong	Lake Macquarie	1861
Copacabana Public School	Copacabana	Central Coast	1983
Denman Public School	Denman	Muswellbrook	1883
Dora Creek Public School	Dora Creek	Lake Macquarie	1870
Dudley Public School	Dudley	Lake Macquarie	1892
Dungog Public School	Dungog	Dungog	1851
East Maitland Public School	East Maitland	Maitland	1874
Edgeworth Heights Public School	Edgeworth	Lake Macquarie	1958
Edgeworth Public School	Edgeworth	Lake Macquarie	1891
Eleebana Public School	Eleebana	Lake Macquarie	1955
Elermore Vale Public School	Elermore Vale	Newcastle	1957
Ellalong Public School	Ellalong	Cessnock	1858
Ellerston Public School	Ellerston	Upper Hunter	1879
Empire Bay Public School	Empire Bay	Central Coast	1881
The Entrance Public School	The Entrance	Central Coast	1915
Erina Heights Public School	Erina Heights	Central Coast	1873
Ettalong Public School	Ettalong	Central Coast	1928
Fassifern Public School	Fassifern	Lake Macquarie	1922
Fennell Bay Public School	Fennell Bay	Lake Macquarie	1959
Fern Bay Public School	Fern Bay	Port Stephens	1955
Floraville Public School	Floraville	Lake Macquarie	1967
Garden Suburb Public School	Garden Suburb	Lake Macquarie	1958
Gateshead Public School	Gateshead	Lake Macquarie	1950
Gateshead West Public School	Gateshead	Lake Macquarie	1967
Gillieston Public School	Gillieston Heights	Maitland	1858
Glen William Public School	Clarence Town	Dungog	1849
Glendale East Public School	Glendale	Lake Macquarie	1959
Glendore Public School	Maryland	Newcastle	1997
Gorokan Public School	Gorokan	Central Coast	1980
Gosford East Public School	East Gosford	Central Coast	1960
Gosford Public School	Gosford	Central Coast	1865
Grahamstown Public School	Raymond Terrace	Port Stephens	1994
Gresford Public School	Gresford	Dungog	1868
Greta Public School	Greta	Cessnock	1875
Gwandalan Public School	Gwandalan	Central Coast	1961
Hamilton North Public School	Broadmeadow	Newcastle	1943
Hamilton Public School	Hamilton	Newcastle	1858
Hamilton South Public School	Merewether	Newcastle	1933
Heaton Public School	Jesmond	Newcastle	1958
Hillsborough Public School	Charlestown	Lake Macquarie	1963
Hinton Public School	Hinton	Maitland	1849
Holgate Public School	Holgate	Central Coast	1928
Iona Primary School	Woodville	Port Stephens	1853
Irrawang Public School	Raymond Terrace	Port Stephens	1968
Islington Public School	Islington	Newcastle	1887
Jerrys Plains Public School	Jerrys Plains	Singleton	1881
Jesmond Public School	Jesmond	Newcastle	1887
Jewells Primary School	Jewells	Lake Macquarie	1977
Jilliby Public School	Jilliby	Central Coast	1889
The Junction Public School	The Junction	Newcastle	1872
Kahibah Public School	Kahibah	Lake Macquarie	1938
Kanwal Public School	Kanwal	Central Coast	1911
Kariong Public School	Kariong	Central Coast	1988
Karuah Public School	Karuah	Mid-Coast	1884
Kearsley Public School	Kearsley	Cessnock	1912
Killarney Vale Public School	Killarney Vale	Central Coast	1969
Kincumber Public School	Kincumber	Central Coast	1870
King Street Public School	Singleton	Singleton	1979
Kirkton Public School	Lower Belford	Cessnock	1882
Kitchener Public School	Kitchener	Cessnock	1917
Kotara South Public School	Kotara South	Newcastle	1959
Kulnura Public School	Kulnura	Central Coast	1928
Kurri Kurri Public School	Kurri Kurri	Cessnock	1904
Laguna Public School	Laguna	Cessnock	1873
Lake Munmorah Public School	Lake Munmorah	Central Coast	1923
Lambton Public School	Lambton	Newcastle	1865
Largs Public School	Largs	Maitland	1849
Lisarow Public School	Lisarow	Central Coast	1928
Lochinvar Public School	Lochinvar	Maitland	1852
Macdonald Valley Public School	Central Macdonald	Central Coast	1850
Maitland Public School	Maitland	Maitland	1858
Mannering Park Public School	Mannering Park	Central Coast	1961
Marks Point Public School	Marks Point	Lake Macquarie	1954
Martindale Public School	Martindale	Muswellbrook	1885
Martins Creek Public School	Martins Creek	Dungog	1892
Maryland Public School	Maryland	Newcastle	1992
Mayfield East Public School	Mayfield	Newcastle	1858
Mayfield West Public School	Mayfield	Newcastle	1925
Medowie Public School	Medowie	Port Stephens	1894
Merewether Heights Public School	Merewether Heights	Newcastle	1970
Merewether Public School	Merewether	Newcastle	1891
Metford Public School	Metford	Maitland	1980
Milbrodale Public School	Milbrodale	Singleton	1921
Millers Forest Public School	Millers Forest	Port Stephens	1883
Millfield Public School	Millfield	Cessnock	1868
Minmi Public School	Minmi	Newcastle	1861
Morisset Public School	Morisset	Lake Macquarie	1891
Morpeth Public School	Morpeth	Maitland	1862
Mount Hutton Public School	Mount Hutton	Lake Macquarie	1955
Mount Kanwary Public School	Osterley	Port Stephens	1927
Mount Pleasant Public School	Greenland	Singleton	1880
Mulbring Public School	Mulbring	Cessnock	1849
Murrurundi Public School	Murrurundi	Upper Hunter	1849
Muswellbrook Public School	Muswellbrook	Muswellbrook	1862
Muswellbrook South Public School	Muswellbrook	Muswellbrook	1952
Narara Public School	Lisarow	Central Coast	1889
New Lambton Heights Infants School	New Lambton Heights	Newcastle	1951
New Lambton Public School	New Lambton	Newcastle	1880
New Lambton South Public School	New Lambton	Newcastle	1950
Newcastle East Public School	The Hill	Newcastle	1883
Niagara Park Public School	Niagara Park	Central Coast	1974
Nillo Infants School	Lorn	Maitland	1920
Nords Wharf Public School	Nords Wharf	Lake Macquarie	1901
Northlakes Public School	San Remo	Central Coast	1991
Nulkaba Public School	Nulkaba	Cessnock	1922
Ourimbah Public School	Ourimbah	Central Coast	1863
Paterson Public School	Paterson	Dungog	1875
Paxton Public School	Paxton	Cessnock	1923
Peats Ridge Public School	Peats Ridge	Central Coast	1931
Pelaw Main Public School	Pelaw Main	Cessnock	1903
Pelican Flat Public School	Pelican	Lake Macquarie	1938
Plattsburg Public School	Wallsend	Newcastle	1865
Point Clare Public School	Point Clare	Central Coast	1955
Pretty Beach Public School	Pretty Beach	Central Coast	1927
Rathmines Public School	Rathmines	Lake Macquarie	1941
Raymond Terrace Public School	Raymond Terrace	Port Stephens	1858
Redhead Public School	Redhead	Lake Macquarie	1908
Rouchel Public School	Upper Rouchel	Upper Hunter	1875
Rutherford Public School	Rutherford	Maitland	1985
Salt Ash Public School	Salt Ash	Port Stephens	1883
Sandy Hollow Public School	Sandy Hollow	Muswellbrook	1877
Scone Public School	Scone	Upper Hunter	1863
Seaham Public School	Seaham	Port Stephens	1852
Shoal Bay Public School	Shoal Bay	Port Stephens	1991
Shortland Public School	Shortland	Newcastle	1927
Singleton Heights Public School	Singleton Heights	Singleton	1978
Singleton Public School	Singleton	Singleton	1852
Soldiers Point Public School	Soldiers Point	Port Stephens	1947
Somersby Public School	Somersby	Central Coast	1893
Speers Point Public School	Speers Point	Lake Macquarie	1957
Spencer Public School	Spencer	Central Coast	1900
Stanford Merthyr Infants School	Stanford Merthyr	Cessnock	1926
Stockton Public School	Stockton	Newcastle	1861
Swansea Public School	Swansea	Lake Macquarie	1875
Tacoma Public School	Tacoma	Central Coast	1905
Tanilba Bay Public School	Tanilba Bay	Port Stephens	1954
Tarro Public School	Tarro	Newcastle	1961
Tea Gardens Public School	Tea Gardens	Mid-Coast	1877
Telarah Public School	Telarah	Maitland	1890
Tenambit Public School	Tenambit	Maitland	1902
Teralba Public School	Teralba	Lake Macquarie	1884
Terrigal Public School	Terrigal	Central Coast	1910
Thornton Public School	Thornton	Maitland	1919
Tighes Hill Public School	Tighes Hill	Newcastle	1878
Tomaree Public School	Salamander Bay	Port Stephens	1886
Toronto Public School	Toronto	Lake Macquarie	1890
Toukley Public School	Toukley	Central Coast	1891
Tuggerah Public School	Tuggerah	Central Coast	1892
Tuggerawong Public School	Tuggerawong	Central Coast	1957
Umina Public School	Umina Beach	Central Coast	1956
Vacy Public School	Vacy	Dungog	1859
Valentine Public School	Valentine	Lake Macquarie	1958
Valley View Public School	Wyoming	Central Coast	1980
Wallsend Public School	Wallsend	Newcastle	1862
Wallsend South Public School	Elermore Vale	Newcastle	1952
Wamberal Public School	Wamberal	Central Coast	1877
Wangi Wangi Public School	Wangi Wangi	Lake Macquarie	1920
Waratah Public School	Waratah	Newcastle	1864
Waratah West Public School	Waratah West	Newcastle	1954
Warners Bay Public School	Warners Bay	Lake Macquarie	1892
Warnervale Public School	Warnervale	Central Coast	1958
West Wallsend Public School	West Wallsend	Lake Macquarie	1889
Weston Public School	Weston	Cessnock	1905
Windale Public School	Windale	Lake Macquarie	1953
Wirreanda Public School	Medowie	Port Stephens	1985
Wisemans Ferry Public School	Wisemans Ferry	Hornsby	1867
Woodberry Public School	Woodberry	Maitland	1972
Woodport Public School	Erina	Central Coast	1893
Woongarrah Public School	Woongarrah	Central Coast	2005
Woy Woy Public School	Woy Woy	Central Coast	1891
Woy Woy South Public School	Woy Woy	Central Coast	1964
Wyee Public School	Wyee	Central Coast	1879
Wyoming Public School	Wyoming	Central Coast	1955
Wyong Creek Public School	Wyong Creek	Central Coast	1883
Wyong Public School	Watanobbi	Central Coast	1888

=== High schools ===
In New South Wales, a high school generally covers Years 7 to 12 in the education system, and a central or community school, intended to provide comprehensive education in a rural district, covers Kindergarten to Year 12. An additional class of high schools has emerged in recent years as a result of amalgamations which have produced multi-campus colleges consisting of Junior and Senior campuses.

While most schools are comprehensive and take in all students of high school age living within its defined school boundaries, some schools are either specialist in a given Key Learning Area, or selective in that they set examinations or other performance criteria for entrance. In the Hunter and Central Coast region, Gorokan, Gosford and Merewether High Schools are selective, whilst Hunter School of Performing Arts and Hunter Sports High School are specialist.

Name	Suburb	LGA	Opened
Belmont High School	Belmont	Lake Macquarie	1953
Brisbane Water Secondary College (Umina Campus)	Umina	Central Coast	1976
Brisbane Water Secondary College (Woy Woy Campus)	Woy Woy	Central Coast	1962
Bulahdelah Central School	Bulahdelah	Mid-Coast	1868
Callaghan College (Jesmond Campus)	Jesmond	Newcastle	1956
Callaghan College (Wallsend Campus)	Wallsend	Newcastle	1960
Callaghan College (Waratah Technology Campus)	Waratah	Newcastle	1934
Cardiff High School	Cardiff	Lake Macquarie	1962
Cessnock High School	Cessnock	Cessnock	1934
Dungog High School	Dungog	Dungog	1971
Erina High School	Erina	Central Coast	1964
Francis Greenway High School	Woodberry	Maitland	1966
Glendale Technology High School	Glendale	Lake Macquarie	1970
Gloucester High School	Gloucester	Mid-Coast	1961
Gorokan High School	Gorokan	Central Coast	1976
Gosford High School	Gosford	Central Coast	1929
Henry Kendall High School	Gosford	Central Coast	1970
Hunter River High School	Heatherbrae	Port Stephens	1956
Hunter School of Performing Arts	Broadmeadow	Newcastle	1923
Hunter Sports High School	Gateshead	Lake Macquarie	1959
Irrawang High School	Raymond Terrace	Port Stephens	1983
Kariong Mountains High School	Kariong	Central Coast	2010
Kincumber High School	Kincumber	Central Coast	1990
Kotara High School	Kotara	Newcastle	1968
Kurri Kurri High School	Kurri Kurri	Cessnock	1956
Lake Macquarie High School	Booragul	Lake Macquarie	1958
Lake Munmorah High School	Lake Munmorah	Lake Macquarie	2000
Lambton High School	Lambton	Newcastle	1974
Lisarow High School	Lisarow	Central Coast	1980
Maitland Grossmann High School	East Maitland	Maitland	1884
Maitland High School	East Maitland	Maitland	1884
Merewether High School	Broadmeadow	Newcastle	1977
Merriwa Central School	Merriwa	Upper Hunter	1850
Morisset High School	Morisset	Lake Macquarie	1965
Mount View High School	Cessnock	Cessnock	1985
Muswellbrook High School	Muswellbrook	Muswellbrook	1952
Narara Valley High School	Narara	Central Coast	1991
Newcastle High School	Newcastle West	Newcastle	1976
Northlakes High School	San Remo	Central Coast	1981
Rutherford Technology High School	Rutherford	Maitland	1985
Scone High School	Scone	Upper Hunter	1964
Singleton High School	Singleton	Singleton	1956
Swansea High School	Caves Beach	Lake Macquarie	1963
Terrigal High School	Terrigal	Central Coast	1978
Tomaree High School	Salamander Bay	Port Stephens	1975
Toronto High School	Toronto	Lake Macquarie	1962
Tuggerah Lakes Secondary College	Berkeley Vale	Central Coast	1983
Tuggerah Lakes Secondary College	Long Jetty	Central Coast	1970
Tuggerah Lakes Secondary College	Tumbi Umbi	Central Coast	1997
Wadalba Community School	Wadalba	Central Coast	2000
Warners Bay High School	Warners Bay	Lake Macquarie	1966
West Wallsend High School	West Wallsend	Lake Macquarie	1964
Whitebridge High School	Whitebridge	Lake Macquarie	1963
Wyong High School	Wyong	Central Coast	1950

=== Special schools ===
Special schools are public schools designed for children or youth with disabilities. All children in Australia have a right to access inclusive education, however the system sometimes fails to meet children's needs as it continues to run a dual track system. As a result of a lack of resources and funding into inclusive education, some children are pushed into segregated settings through no fault of their own or their parents or school staff. NSW must invest in inclusive education, creating a plan to move available resources and supports from segregated settings into mainstream schools, if we would ever like to see inclusion really work.

Name	Suburb	LGA	Opened	Website
Five Islands School	Booragul	Lake Macquarie	1987	Website
Girrakool School	Kariong	Central Coast	1913	Website
Glenvale School	Narara	Central Coast	1966	Website
HopeTown School	Wyong	Central Coast	1999	Website
Hunter River Community School	East Maitland	Maitland	1977	Website
John Hunter Hospital School	New Lambton Heights	Newcastle	1974	Website
Kotara School	Kotara	Newcastle	1990	Website
Lakeside School	Gateshead	Lake Macquarie	1977	Website
Newcastle School	Cooks Hill	Newcastle	1955	Website
North Gosford Learning Centre	North Gosford	Central Coast	2007	Website
Wakefield School	Wakefield	Lake Macquarie	2002	Website
Woodberry Learning Centre	Woodberry	Maitland	2007	Website

=== Defunct primary schools ===
Name	Suburb/town	LGA	Opened	Closed	Notes
Aberglasslyn Public School	Aberglasslyn	Maitland	1859	1934	
Abernethy Public School	Abernethy	Cessnock	1916	1966	
Adamstown Heights Infants School	Adamstown Heights	Newcastle	1950	1990	
Alison Public School	Alison	Dungog	1865	1961	Formerly Thalaba until Sep 1911
Allandale Public School	Allandale	Maitland	1882	1942	
Allworth Public School	Allworth	Mid-Coast	1898	1943	Formerly New Wharf until Oct 1915
Allynbrook Public School	Allynbrook	Dungog	1869	1971	Formerly Caergurle until Dec 1908
Ash Island Public School	Kooragang	Newcastle	1873	1968	Now a tourist destination and an information centre
Baerami Creek Public School	Baerami	Muswellbrook	1901	1970	
Bandon Grove Public School	Bandon Grove	Dungog	1862	1984	
Belford Public School	Belford	Singleton	1880	1935	
Bendolba Public School	Bendolba	Dungog	1856	1919	
Big Creek Public School	Hilldale	Dungog	1879	1968	
Birmingham Gardens Infants School	Birmingham Gardens	Newcastle	1951	1993	
Bishops Bridge Public School	Bishops Bridge	Maitland	1858	1965	
Bolton Point Public School	Bolton Point	Lake Macquarie	1943	1966	
Brawboy Public School	Brawboy	Upper Hunter	1960	1968	
Brookfield Public School	Brookfield	Dungog	1851	1969	
Brown Muir Public School	Congewai	Cessnock	1882	1941	
Brunkerville Public School	Brunkerville	Cessnock	1870	1962	Formerly Brokenback until Jun 1893
Brushy Hill Public School	Brushy Hill	Upper Hunter	1880	1940	
Buchanan Public School	Buchanan	Cessnock	1880	1961	
Bulga Public School	Bulga	Singleton	1868	1970	
Bunnan Public School	Bunnan	Upper Hunter	1882	1973	
Bureen Public School	Bureen	Muswellbrook	1945	1970	
Buttai Public School	Buttai	Cessnock	1899	1948	Formerly Stockrington until Jul 1938
Camberwell Public School	Camberwell	Singleton	1853	1958	Formerly Falbrook until Feb 1892
Cambra Public School	Cambra	Dungog	1937	1964	Formerly Black Camp until Jun 1947
Castle Rock Public School	Castle Rock	Muswellbrook	1878	1950	
Catherine Hill Bay Public School	Catherine Hill Bay	Lake Macquarie	1890	1985	
Cedar Brush Creek Public School	Cedar Brush Creek	Central Coast	1901	1980	
Cessnock South Infants School	Cessnock	Cessnock	1926	1987	
Chichester Public School	Chichester	Dungog	1871	1969	Formerly Glenmore until Nov 1880
Christo Road Infants School	Georgetown	Newcastle	1953	1972	
Christo Road Superior Public School	Georgetown	Newcastle	1858	1911	
Colstoun Public School	Colstoun	Dungog	1883	1932	
Cooks Hill Public School	Cooks Hill	Newcastle	1885	1984	Int High 1920–1962
Coxs Gap Public School	Coxs Gap	Muswellbrook	1885	1926	
Crawford River Public School	Crawford River	Mid-Coast	1875	1954	
Crawfordville Infants School	Crawfordville	Cessnock	1929	1969	
Cuan Public School	Cuan	Upper Hunter	1873	1893	
Dagworth Public School	Maitland	Maitland	1853	1858	
Dalwood Public School	Dalwood	Maitland	1898	1970	Formerly Marshwood until May 1934
Dangarfield Public School	Dangarfield	Upper Hunter	1880	1965	Formerly Rouchel Vale (1880–1898), Segenhoe (1899–1923)
Dartbrook Public School	Dartbrook	Upper Hunter	1925	1972	
Dooralong Public School	Wyong	Central Coast	1903	2011	
Doyles Creek Public School	Doyles Creek	Singleton	1871	1931	
Dunbars Creek Public School	Dunbars Creek	Muswellbrook	1880	1893	
Dunolly Public School	Dunolly	Singleton	1883	1940	
Eagleton Public School	Eagleton	Port Stephens	1865	1948	
Eccleston Public School	Eccleston	Dungog	1867	1986	
Elderslie Public School	Elderslie	Singleton	1878	1982	
Eraring Public School	Eraring	Lake Macquarie	1924	2014	
Fernlawn Public School	Ravensworth	Singleton	1885	1926	Formerly Ravensworth North until Dec 1898
Fishers Hill Public School	Fishers Hill	Dungog	1871	1975	Formerly Summer Hill (1871–1884), Bunnabanoo (1885–1934)
Fosterton Public School	Fosterton	Dungog	1865	1962	Formerly Croom Park until Feb 1890
Frazers Knob Public School	Yarrawa	Muswellbrook	1902	1917	
Girvan Public School	Girvan	Mid-Coast	1886	1957	
Glen Gallic Public School	Glen Gallic	Muswellbrook	1934	1967	
Glen Martin Public School	Glen Martin	Dungog	1891	1942	
Glen Oak Public School	Glen Oak	Port Stephens	1872	1944	Formerly Oakendale until Jul 1899
Glenbawn Dam Public School	Glenbawn Dam	Upper Hunter	1955	1966	
Glendale Public School	Glendale	Lake Macquarie	1949	1990	Formerly Cardiff West until Sep 1951
Glendon Brook Public School	Glendon Brook	Singleton	1878	1950	
Glendon East Public School	Glendon Brook	Singleton	1949	1960	
Glennies Creek Public School	Glennies Creek	Singleton	1888	1937	Formerly Middle Falbrook until Aug 1927
Goorangoola Public School	Goorangoola	Singleton	1875	1929	
Gosforth Public School	Gosforth	Maitland	1850	1940	
Gouldsville Public School	Gouldsville	Singleton	1886	1975	
Grenton School	Awaba	Lake Macquarie	1888	1894	
Gunderman Public School	Gunderman	Central Coast	1946	1978	
Gundy Public School	Gundy	Upper Hunter	1872	1991	Formerly Bellevue until 1878
Gungal Public School	Gungal	Upper Hunter	1879	1965	
Halton Public School	Halton	Dungog	1876	1949	Formerly Ballington until Feb 1884
Hebden Public School	Hebden	Singleton	1912	1973	
Heddon Greta Public School	Heddon Greta	Cessnock	1904	1969	
Hexham Public School	Hexham	Newcastle	1850	1976	
Ingar Public School	Ingar	Singleton	1873	1959	Formerly Merannie until Sep 1921
Kangyangy Public School	Kangy Angy	Central Coast	1878	1894	
Kars Springs Public School	Kars Springs	Upper Hunter	1881	1970	Formerly Wybong Upper until Apr 1907
Kayuga Public School	Kayuga	Muswellbrook	1867	1984	
Killingworth Public School	Killingworth	Lake Macquarie	1891	1941	
Kotara Public School	Kotara	Newcastle	1937	1989	Infants until 1939
Lambs Valley Public School	Lambs Valley	Singleton	1884	1907	
Laughtondale Public School	Laughtondale	[[Hornsby Shire|Hornsby]]	1890	1943	
Lemington Public School	Lemington	Singleton	1901	1976	
Lewinsbrook Public School	Lewinsbrook	Dungog	1918	1964	An earlier school operated 1852–1854
Limeburners Creek Public School	Limeburners Creek	Mid-Coast	1877	1966	
Lostock Public School	Lostock	Dungog	1878	1978	
Luskintyre Public School	Luskintyre	Maitland	1896	1904	
Main Creek Public School	Main Creek	Dungog	1908	1960	
Maison Dieu Public School	Maison Dieu	Singleton	1896	1977	
Mandalong Public School	Mandalong	Lake Macquarie	1872	1947	
Mangoola Public School	Mangoola	Muswellbrook	1930	1968	Formerly Roxburgh until 1933
Mangrove Creek Public School	Lower Mangrove	Central Coast	1868	1938	
Mangrove Mountain Public School	Mangrove Mountain	Central Coast	1895	1978	Formerly Koree until 1937
Manobalai Public School	Manobalai	Muswellbrook	1896	1978	
Martinsville Public School	Martinsville	Lake Macquarie	1878	1974	Formerly Dora Creek until Feb 1894
McCullys Gap Public School	McCullys Gap	Muswellbrook	1916	1969	
Mirannie Public School	Mirannie	Singleton	1925	1970	
Mirraview Public School	Mirrabooka	Lake Macquarie	1934	1972	
Mitchells Flat Public School	Mitchells Flat	Dungog	1882	1956	
Moonan Brook Public School	Moonan Brook	Upper Hunter	1869	1970	
Moonan Flat Public School	Moonan Flat	Upper Hunter	1876	2006	
Mooney Mooney Public School	Mooney Mooney	Central Coast	1939	2006	
Mosquito Island Public School	Kooragang	Newcastle	1858	1932	
Mount Dangar Public School	Mount Dangar	Muswellbrook	1870	1964	Formerly Baerami until October 1902
Mount Rivers Public School	Mount Rivers	Dungog	1875	1981	
Mount Thorley Public School	Mount Thorley	Singleton	1873	1945	
Mount View Public School	Mount View	Cessnock	1881	1953	
Mount White Public School	Mount White	Central Coast	1935	1989	
Mulwee Public School	Swan Bay	Port Stephens	1889	1992	
Munni Public School	Munni	Dungog	1877	1951	
Muscle Creek Public School	Muscle Creek	Muswellbrook	1869	1943	
Neath Public School	Neath	Cessnock	1913	1971	Infants until 1917
Nelsons Plains Public School	Nelsons Plains	Port Stephens	1852	1919	
Newcastle Public School	Newcastle	Newcastle	1858	1911	
Oakhampton Public School	Oakhampton	Maitland	1877	1955	
Oswald Public School	Oswald	Maitland	1859	1882	
Owendale Public School	Owendale	Singleton	1890	1917	
Owens Gap Public School	Owens Gap	Upper Hunter	1884	1941	
Pages River Public School	Pages River	Upper Hunter	1880	1912	
Parkville Public School	Parkville	Upper Hunter	1874	1944	Formerly Park until Jul 1888
Paynes Crossing Public School	Paynes Crossing	Cessnock	1871	1932	Formerly Stockyard Creek until Sep 1892
Pindimar Public School	Pindimar	Mid-Coast	1925	1938	
Pokolbin Public School	Pokolbin	Cessnock	1880	1973	
Quorrobolong Public School	Quorrobolong	Cessnock	1865	1961	
Ravensdale Public School	Ravensdale	Central Coast	1892	1956	
Ravensworth Public School	Ravensworth	Singleton	1876	1986	
Rixs Creek Public School	Rixs Creek	Singleton	1880	1923	
Rosebrook Public School	Rosebrook	Maitland	1868	1984	
Rosenthal Public School	Rosenthal	Mid-Coast	1884	1947	
Rothbury North Public School	Rothbury North	Cessnock	1916	1984	
Rothbury Public School	Rothbury	Cessnock	1868	1964	Formerly Mount Wills until Feb 1883
Roughit Public School	Roughit	Singleton	1864	1980	Formerly Scotts Flat until 1871
Salisbury Public School	Salisbury	Dungog	1875	1982	
Sandgate Infants School	Sandgate	Newcastle	1942	1969	
Sawyers Gully Public School	Sawyers Gully	Cessnock	1894	1965	
Sedgefield Public School	Sedgefield	Singleton	1859	1920	
Segenhoe Public School	Segenhoe	Upper Hunter	1902	1974	Formerly Leighton Park until Jun 1936
Singleton South Infants School	Singleton	Singleton	1906	1978	
St Albans Public School	St Albans	Central Coast	1868	1946	
St Ethels Public School	South Maitland	Maitland	1882	1986	
Stanhope Public School	Stanhope	Singleton	1850	1958	
Sugarloaf Creek Public School	Sugarloaf	Dungog	1882	1931	
Sunnywood Public School	Freemans Waterhole	Lake Macquarie	1953	1980	
Sweetmans Creek Public School	Sweetmans Creek	Cessnock	1878	1937	
Timor Public School	Timor	Upper Hunter	1879	1935	
Tomago Public School	Tomago	Port Stephens	1849	1985	
Turill Public School	Turill	Upper Hunter	1888	1976	
Wakefield Public School	Wakefield	Lake Macquarie	1898	1982	Formerly Rhondda until 1911
Wallalong Public School	Wallalong	Port Stephens	1861	1954	
Wallarobba Public School	Wallarobba	Dungog	1919	1971	
Wallsend East Infants School	Wallsend	Newcastle	1951	1957	
Wangat Public School	Wangat	Dungog	1883	1954	Formerly Dusodie until Nov 1917
Warkworth Public School	Warkworth	Singleton	1859	1997	
Watagan Public School	Watagan	Cessnock	1862	1944	
Webbs Creek Public School	Webbs Creek	Central Coast	1891	1922	
Welshmans Creek Public School	Welshmans Creek	Dungog	1877	1936	
Whitebridge Infants School	Whitebridge	Lake Macquarie	1944	1962	
Whittingham Public School	Whittingham	Singleton	1881	1983	
Wickham Public School	Wickham	Newcastle	1878	1990	Included a JTS 1913–1931
Widden Public School	Widden	Muswellbrook	1949	1982	
Williamtown Public School	Williamtown	Port Stephens	1869	2009	
Wingen Public School	Wingen	Upper Hunter	1870	1968	
Woerden Public School	Woerden	Dungog	1890	1942	
Wollombi Public School	Wollombi	Cessnock	1852	2014	
Woolooma Public School	Woolooma	Upper Hunter	1910	1974	Formerly Womelguy until March 1920
Wybong Public School	Wybong	Muswellbrook	1872	1910	
Wyong Grove Public School	Wyong	Central Coast	1981	2014	
Yango Creek Public School	Yango Creek	Cessnock	1883	1925	
Yarramalong Public School	Yarramalong	Central Coast	1870	2009	Formerly Wyong Creek until September 1888
Yarrawa Public School	Yarrawa	Muswellbrook	1919	1959	

== Private schools ==
=== Catholic primary schools ===
In New South Wales, Catholic primary schools are usually (but not always) linked to a parish. Prior to the 1970s, most schools were founded by religious institutes, but with the decrease in membership of these institutes, together with major reforms inside the church, lay teachers and administrators began to take over the schools, a process completed by approximately 1995. The Catholic Education Office (CEO), located in the Newcastle-Maitland and Broken Bay dioceses of the Church, is responsible for coordinating administration, curriculum and policy across the Catholic school system. Preference for enrolment is given to Catholic students from the parish or local area, although non-Catholic students are admitted if room is available.

Name	Suburb	LGA	Opened
Corpus Christi Primary School	Waratah	Newcastle	1933
Holy Cross Primary School	Kincumber	Central Coast	1991
Holy Cross Primary School	Glendale	Lake Macquarie	1958
Holy Family Primary School	Merewether	Newcastle	1956
Holy Name Primary School	Forster	Mid-Coast	1961
Holy Spirit Infants School	Abermain	Cessnock	1909
Holy Spirit Primary School	Kurri Kurri	Cessnock	1909
Our Lady of Lourdes Primary School	Tarro	Newcastle	1944
Our Lady of the Rosary Primary School	Wyoming	Central Coast	1978
Our Lady of the Rosary Primary School	Shelly Beach	Central Coast	1952
Our Lady of Victories Catholic Primary School	Shortland	Newcastle	1957
Our Lady Star of the Sea Primary School	Terrigal	Central Coast	1979
St Aloysius Catholic Primary School	Chisholm	Maitland	2015
St Benedict's Primary School	Edgeworth	Lake Macquarie	1962
St Brendan's Primary School	Lake Munmorah	Central Coast	1989
St Brigid's Primary School	Branxton	Cessnock	1886
St Brigid's Primary School	Raymond Terrace	Port Stephens	1890
St Cecilia's Primary School	Wyong	Central Coast	1916
St Columba's Primary School	Adamstown	Newcastle	1892
St Columba's Primary School	Mayfield	Newcastle	1917
St Francis Xavier Primary School	Belmont	Lake Macquarie	1950
St James Primary School	Muswellbrook	Muswellbrook	1862
St James Primary School	Kotara South	Newcastle	1961
St John Fisher Primary School	Tumbi Umbi	Central Coast	1988
St John The Baptist Primary School	Woy Woy	Central Coast	1922
St John The Baptist Primary School	Maitland	Maitland	1856
St John Vianney Primary School	Morisset	Lake Macquarie	1962
St John's Primary School	Lambton	Newcastle	1873
St Joseph's Primary School	Dungog	Dungog	1888
St Joseph's Primary School	Gloucester	Mid-Coast	1919
St Joseph's Primary School	Bulahdelah	Mid-Coast	1955
St Joseph's Primary School	Charlestown	Lake Macquarie	1927
St Joseph's Primary School	Kilaben Bay	Lake Macquarie	1950
St Joseph's Primary School	East Maitland	Maitland	1885
St Joseph's Primary School	The Junction	Newcastle	1885
St Joseph's Primary School	Denman	Upper Hunter	1916
St Joseph's Primary School	Merriwa	Upper Hunter	1883
St Kevin's Primary School	Cardiff	Lake Macquarie	1917
St Marys Infants School	Greta	Cessnock	1900
St Mary's Primary School	Warners Bay	Lake Macquarie	1958
St Mary's Primary School	Scone	Upper Hunter	1887
St Mary's Primary School	Noraville	Central Coast	1973
St Michael's Primary School	Nelson Bay	Port Stephens	1962
St Patrick's Primary School	Cessnock	Cessnock	1906
St Patrick's Primary School	East Gosford	Central Coast	1959
St Patrick's Primary School	Swansea	Lake Macquarie	1952
St Patrick's Primary School	Lochinvar	Maitland	1900
St Patrick's Primary School	Wallsend	Newcastle	1883
St Paul's Primary School	Gateshead	Lake Macquarie	1964
St Paul's Primary School	Rutherford	Maitland	1958
St Peter's Primary School	Stockton	Newcastle	1887
St Pius X Primary School	Windale	Lake Macquarie	1959
St Therese's Primary School	New Lambton	Newcastle	1925

=== Catholic high schools ===
Name	Suburb	LGA	Opened
All Saints College, St Mary's Campus	Maitland	Maitland	1992
All Saints College, St Peter's Campus	Maitland	Maitland	1992
All Saints College, St Joseph's Campus	Lochinvar	Maitland	1992
Mackillop Catholic College	Warnervale	Central Coast	2003
St Bede's Catholic College	Chisholm	Maitland	2018
St Brigid's Catholic College	Lake Munmorah	Central Coast	2014
St Catherine's Catholic College	Singleton	Singleton	1875
St Edward's College	East Gosford	Central Coast	1953
St Francis Xavier College	Hamilton East	Newcastle	1985
San Clemente Catholic High School	Mayfield	Newcastle	1916
St Joseph's Catholic College	East Gosford	Central Coast	1967
St John Paul College	Coffs Harbour	Coffs Harbour City Council	1983
St Mary's High School	Gateshead	Lake Macquarie	1964
St Paul's High School	Booragul	Lake Macquarie	1984
St Peter's Catholic College	Tuggerah	Central Coast	1983
St Pius X High School	Adamstown	Newcastle	1957
San Clemente Catholic High School	Mayfield	Newcastle	1916

=== Other private schools ===
Name	Suburb	LGA	Category	Opened
Avondale School	Cooranbong	Cooranbong	Adventist	1897
Belmont Christian College	Belmont North	Lake Macquarie	Christian (CSA)	1989
Bishop Tyrrell Anglican College	Fletcher	Newcastle	Anglican	1999
Brightwaters Christian College	Brightwaters	Lake Macquarie	Christian (CSA)	2004
Central Coast Adventist School	Erina	Central Coast	7DA	1969
Central Coast Grammar School	Erina Heights	Central Coast	E PRIV	1985
Central Coast Montessori School	Bateau Bay	Central Coast	Montessori	2017
Central Coast Rudolf Steiner School	Fountaindale	Central Coast	Waldorf/Steiner	1995
Charlton Christian College	Fassifern	Lake Macquarie	Christian (CSA)	1998
The Coast Christian School	Bensville	Central Coast	Christian	2000
Dunmore Lang Christian School	Muswellbrook	Muswellbrook	Christian (CSA)	1999
Green Point Christian College	Green Point	Central Coast	Baptist	1982
Heritage College	Cooranbong	Lake Macquarie	Christadelphian	1997
Hunter Christian School	Mayfield	Newcastle	Christian (CSA)	1981
Hunter Trade College	Telarah	Maitland	Vocational	2007
Hunter Valley Grammar School	Ashtonfield	Maitland	Independent	1990
Lakes Grammar – An Anglican School	Warnervale	Central Coast	Anglican	2004
Learning Cloud Australia	Wickham	Newcastle	Vocational	2014
Linuwel Steiner School	East Maitland	Maitland	Waldorf/Steiner	1979
M.E.T. School – Cardiff South Campus	Cardiff South	Lake Macquarie	Brethren	
M.E.T. School – Maitland Campus	East Maitland	Maitland	Brethren	
M.E.T. School – North Gosford Campus	North Gosford	Central Coast	Brethren	
Macquarie College	Wallsend	Lake Macquarie	7DA	1901
Maitland Christian School	Metford	Maitland	Christian (CSA)	1983
Medowie Christian School	Medowie	Port Stephens	Christian (CSA)	1995
Newcastle Grammar School	The Hill	Newcastle	Anglican	1859
Newcastle Waldorf School	Glendale	Lake Macquarie	Waldorf/Steiner	1980
St Philip's Christian College	Narara	Central Coast	Christian	2007
St Philip's Christian College	Waratah	Newcastle	Christian	1982
St Philip's Christian College (Port Stephens)	Salamander Bay	Port Stephens	Christian	1995
St Philip's Christian School (Cessnock)	Cessnock	Cessnock	Christian	1998
Scone Grammar School	Scone	Upper Hunter	Anglican	1845
Singleton Christian College	Singleton	Singleton	Christian (CSA)	1988
The Lakes College	Blue Haven	Central Coast	Independent	2017
Toronto Adventist School	Toronto	Lake Macquarie	7DA	2011
Vibe Learning	New Lambton	Newcastle	Vocational	2014
Wyong Christian Community School	Wyong	Central Coast	Baptist	1993

=== Special-purpose private schools ===
The Government of New South Wales recognises a registration category known as "Prescribed Non-Government Schools" which serve the same purposes as Special Schools but are privately operated.

Name	Suburb	LGA	Category	Opened
ALESCO Learning Centre	Cooks Hill	Newcastle	Independent	2002
Aspect Central Coast School	Terrigal	Central Coast	Independent	
DALE Christian School	Waratah	Newcastle	Independent	1997
Hunter School for Children with Autism	Shortland	Newcastle	Independent	
Kids Care Mentoring Service	Windale	Lake Macquarie	Catholic	1997
Margaret Jurd College	Shortland	Newcastle	Independent	1996
St Dominic's Centre for Hearing Impaired Children	Mayfield	Newcastle	Catholic	1872
Toogoolawa School	Wickham	Newcastle	Independent	2000

=== Defunct private schools ===
Name	Suburb	LGA	Category	Opened	Closed	Notes
Fern Valley Montessori Primary School	Cardiff	Lake Macquarie	Montessori	1999	2008	
Maitland District Seventh-day Adventist School	Gillieston Heights	Maitland	7DA	1976	1990	
St Anne's College	Adamstown	Newcastle	Catholic girls	1966	1982	
St Joseph's High School	Lochinvar	Maitland	Catholic girls	1884	1991	Amalgamated to form All Saints College.
St Mary's High School	Maitland	Maitland	Catholic girls	1867	1991	Amalgamated to form All Saints College. First Dominican college in NSW.
St Peter's High School	Maitland	Maitland	Catholic boys	1838	1991	Amalgamated to form All Saints College. Formerly St John's Boys School until 1917; Marist Brothers High until 1984.
Stott's Secondary College	Newcastle	Newcastle	International		2006	Year 11–12

== See also ==
- List of schools in Australia
- List of schools in New South Wales
