= Newcastle High School (Australia) =

Location
- 160–200 Parkway Avenue, Hamilton South, Hunter Region, New South Wales; Australia; 32°55′56″S 151°45′28″E

Information
- Former name: Newcastle Girls' High School
- Type: Government-funded co-educational comprehensive secondary day school
- Motto: Latin: Remis Velisque (With Oars and Sails; with all one's might)
- Established: 1929; 97 years ago (as Newcastle Girls' High School)
- Educational authority: New South Wales Department of Education
- Principal: Janene Rosser
- Teaching staff: 81.2 FTE (2018)
- Years: 7–12
- Enrolment: 1,079 (2018)
- Campus: Urban
- Colours: Red and blue
- Website: newcastle-h.schools.nsw.gov.au

Newcastle High School is a government-funded co-educational comprehensive secondary day school, located in Newcastle West, a suburb of Newcastle, in the Hunter region of New South Wales, Australia.

Newcastle High School was established in 1976, following the dismantling of the single-sex selective school system. In 2018 the school enrollment numbered approximately 1,080 students, from Year 7 to Year 12, of whom 13 percent identified as Indigenous Australians and nine percent were from a language background other than English. The school is operated by the NSW Department of Education in accordance with the education curriculum, as determined by the New South Wales Education Standards Authority. Newcastle High School has one of the largest Special Education Unit in the Entire Hunter Region. As of October 2020 the principal is Janene Rosser.

== History ==
Newcastle High School is the last of several schools that shared a similar and sometimes common history:

- Newcastle East Public School – established in 1906
- Newcastle Girls' High School – an academically selective girls' only high school which began its separate existence (from "The Hill") in 1929 at Hamilton
- Hunter Girls' High School which in 1957 replaced Newcastle Home Science High School (1944–1957) as the other academically selective girls' only high school
- Newcastle Boys' High School – an academically selective boys' only high school which moved to Waratah in 1934

The school occupies the campuses previously occupied by two girls' high schools: Hunter Girls' High School and Newcastle Girls' High School. The campus of Newcastle Boys' High School became non-selective and co-educational in 1977 and changed its name to Waratah High School that same year. Later it became Waratah Technology High School, then Callaghan College Waratah Technology Campus. Prior to the 1989 establishment of Merewether High School as a co-educational academically selective school, students from Newcastle High School consistently enjoyed considerable academic success at both School Certificate (now the Record of School Achievement) and Higher School Certificate (HSC) examinations.

== Notable alumni ==
=== Newcastle Girls' High School ===
- Virginia Chadwick – former NSW Cabinet Minister and politician (1944–2009)
- Julie Sutton – former Mayor of Warringah Council

=== Newcastle High School (1976–present) ===
- Jamie Brazier – Papua New Guinea cricketer
- Belinda Clark – Australian women's cricket captain
- Ben Gillies – drummer in Australian rock band Silverchair
- Archie Goodwin – soccer player for the Newcastle Jets
- Chris Joannou – bass guitarist in Australian rock band Silverchair
- Daniel Johns – vocalist and guitarist in Australian rock band Silverchair
- Miranda Otto – actress
- Paul Woseen – songwriter and bass guitarist in Australian rock band The Screaming Jets (1967–2023)
- Sarah Wynter – actress

== See also ==
- List of government schools in New South Wales
- Education in Australia
