= Ken Trevallion =

Australian drug rehabilatator

Ken Trevallion OAM
- Born: Kenneth James Trevallion; 17 July 1925; Newcastle, New South Wales, Australia
- Died: 9 September 2009 (aged 84); Sydney, New South Wales, Australia
- Citizenship: Australian
- Education: Newcastle Boys High School, New South Wales
- Awards: Order of Australia Medal

Kenneth James Trevallion OAM (17 July 1925 – 9 September 2009) was an Australian known for his work with We Help Ourselves drug rehabilitation centres and the Myalgic Encephalomyelitis and Chronic Fatigue Syndrome Society of New South Wales.

Born in Newcastle, New South Wales, Ken Trevallion was educated at Newcastle Boys' High School.

He joined the RAAF in 1943 and served with the No. 148 Squadron RAF, in Italy and Egypt, as a tail gunner flying on Vickers Wellington, Handley Page Halifax and Consolidated B-24 Liberator bombers. Ken was discharged from the RAAF with the rank of Warrant Officer in 1945.

After the war Ken attended the University of Sydney and then went on to work at the Reserve Bank of Australia. He left the bank in 1961 and followed his brothers into the motor business. He established Kenyon Truck Sales Pty Ltd in 1965 and National Truck Spares Pty Ltd in 1985.

In 1950, he married Barbara Ethel Gould and they had 4 sons: Nicholas, James, Bernard and Adrian.

Ken’s involvement with We help Ourselves started in 1980 when he joined the board and he served as president of that organization from February 1998 to September 2005.

He was a recipient of the Medal of the Order of Australia (OAM) for service to the community.

He died in 2009.
