= Christ Church School (Colony of New South Wales) =

School in Newcastle, New South Wales, Australia

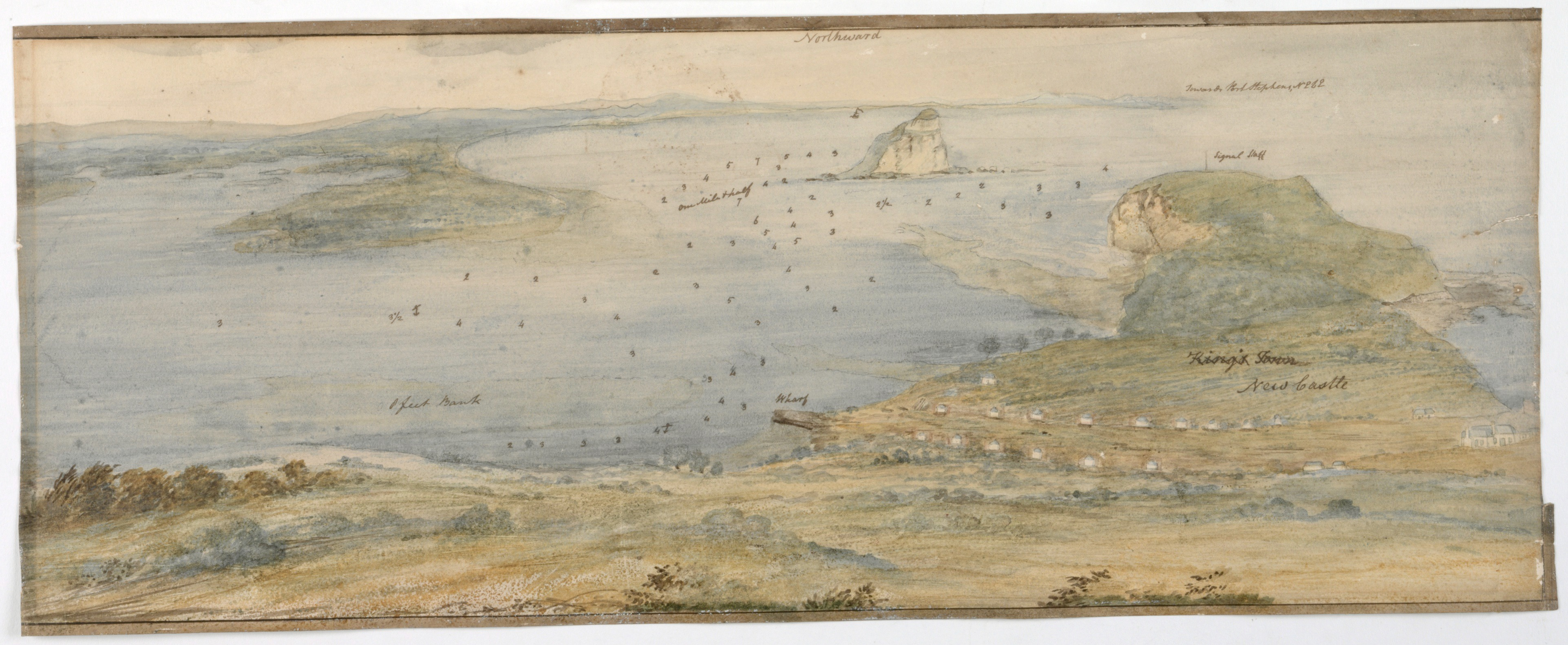
- Newcastle penal settlement from Prospect Hill, c. 1810.

- Location within New South Wales
- 32°55′47″S 151°46′50″E
- Location: Church Street, The Hill, Newcastle, New South Wales
- Country: Australia

Christ Church School (1816 – 1883) was the first school in the penal settlement of Newcastle, in the Colony of New South Wales. The school opened in 1816 as a co-educational primary school. In 1883, Christ Church School closed when it was incorporated into the New South Wales government school system.

== History ==
On 15 March 1804, Governor Philip King, the Governor of New South Wales, instructed a penal settlement (Note: The penal settlement was to be a place of secondary punishment for convicts of the Castle Hill rebellion.) be re-established (Note: In 1801, a convict camp was established to mine coal and cut timber but closed less than a year later.) in the area of Coal Harbour and the Hunter River. Governor King commissioned Lieutenant Charles Menzies commandant of the settlement. Lieutenant Menzies, five expedition personnel, 11 military guards, and 34 convicts, a total of 51 people, arrived on three small ships on 30 March 1804.

In 1810, Reverend William Cowper requested a charity school (Note: A charity school was created when the local community provided a minimum number of students and raised a portion of the school's building costs. The Crown would support the school by providing land, finance the completion of the school's construction and pay a teacher's salary.) be established for the 12 school-age children in the settlement. Reverend Cowper recommended Reverend John Eyre be appointed as schoolmaster. However, in March 1810, Governor Lachlan Macquarie appointed Reverend Eyre schoolmaster of a new charity school in Parramatta.

In February 1814, Lieutenant Thomas Thompson was appointed commandant of the Newcastle settlement.

In 1816, the population of the penal settlement had risen to 413 people, including 38 school-age children.

== First School in Newcastle ==
The first school in Newcastle started under the superintendence and direction of Lieutenant Thompson. Lieutenant Thompson appointed Henry Wrensford, a convict on conditional parole, as the first Schoolmaster. (Note: On 18 May 1812, Wrensford was convicted of fraud at Clerkenwell, Middlesex, England and sentenced to seven years transportation.) Wrensford held a Master's degree from The University of Oxford, England.

=== Slab Hut ===
On 5 May 1816, Wrensford started the school in a whitewashed slab hut near Watt and Dalton Streets. The first students at the school were eight girls and nine boys.

In 1816, when Lieutenant Thompson's commission as commandant was about to finish, he appealed to Reverend Cowper regarding the school. Reverend Cowper entreated Governor Macquarie for the Crown to continue to support the school when the next commandant was commissioned. When Captain James Wallis was commissioned as commandant in June 1816, Governor Macquarie gave him a list of 41 instructions. The 40th instruction concerned the school:

There being a considerable number of children at Newcastle belonging to the convicts now at that settlement, and the present commandant there having very laudable recently established a School for their education under his own immediate superintendence and direction, such school is to be continued and patronised as well by yourself as by every succeeding commandant and you are to give it every possible support and encouragement, it being highly approved of by the Governor as a most benevolent and praiseworthy institution.

=== Christ Church ===
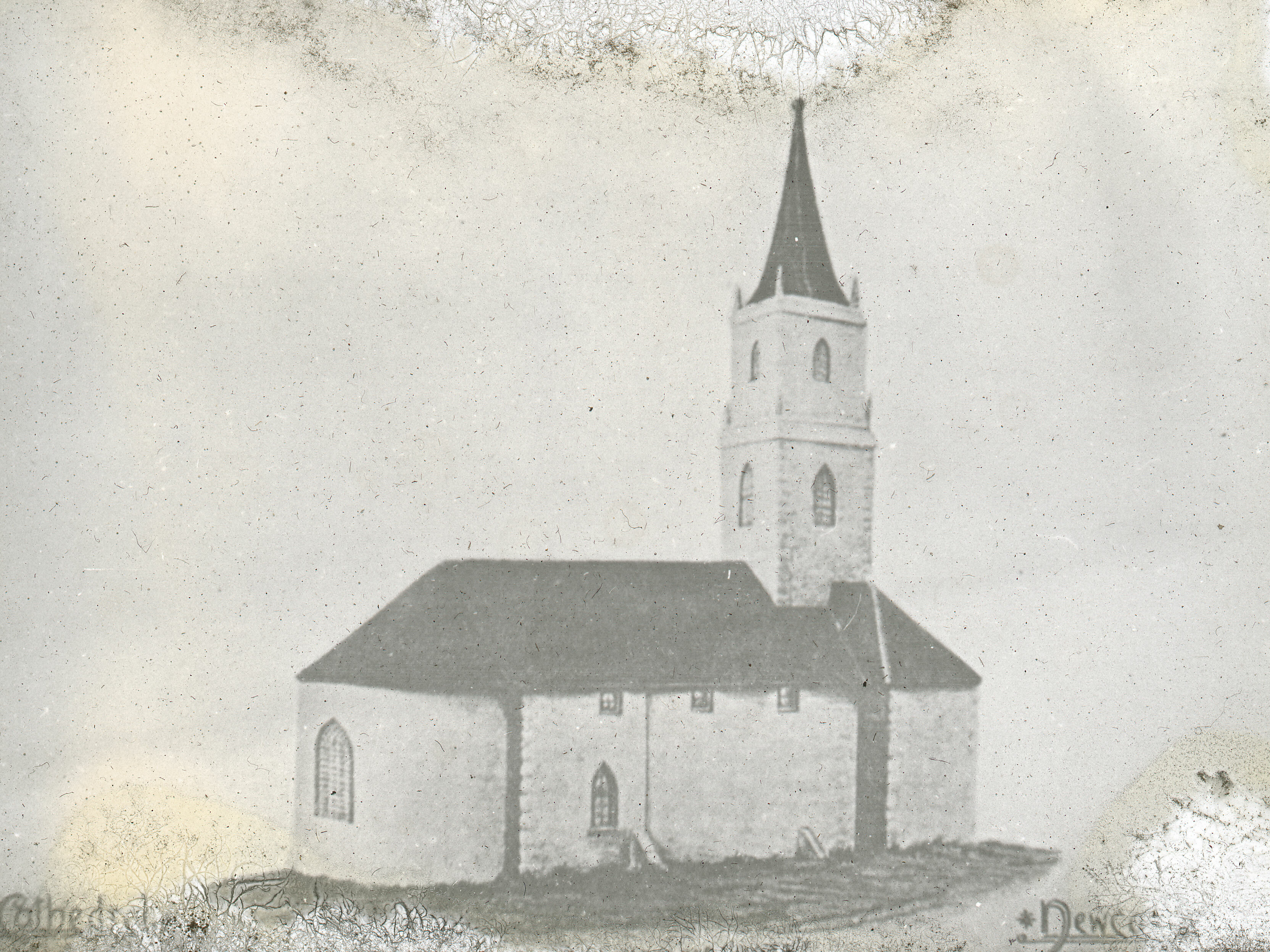
Christ Church c.1817

In mid-1818, the school moved into the vestry of the newly constructed Christ Church on The Hill. The church was designed by Captain James Wallis and opened by Reverend Cowper on Sunday, 2 August 1818. The church was named Christ Church by Governor Macquarie and became the school's namesake.

In June 1820, Samuel Dell (Note: In September 1819, Dell was convicted of forgery at the Middlesex Sessions, England and sentenced to 14 years transportation.) replaced Wrensford as schoolmaster when Wrensford became a free man. (Note: Wrensford returned to Sydney where he was appointed schoolmaster at Castlereagh.) Christ Church School had 33 students when Dell became Schoolmaster, 26 of whom were children of convicts.

In June 1828, John Gabbage replaced Dell as schoolmaster when Dell was granted a ticket-of-leave by Governor Ralph Darling. Gabbage was the first free person appointed schoolmaster.

=== Cnr Church and Bolton Streets ===
By the early 1830s, overcrowding in the vestry led Christ Church School to relocate. (Note: Christ Church remained in use as a church until 1884 when the building was demolished to make way for Christ Church Cathedral.) The Crown granted the land on the corner of Church and Bolton Streets to the Church of England for the express purpose of building a school. The school operated on the site for 50 years. In 1882, after changes to government education regulations, the NSW Government Minister for Public Instruction paid £2000 for the school. The purpose was to establish a second government school in Newcastle. (Note: In 1859, the government had opened Newcastle Public School in Brown Street.)

On 1 April 1883, Christ Church School closed and the students were integrated into the NSW public education system. (Note: Government school start dates are calculated from when they are incorporated into the government school system. The new government school was named Christ Church Public School. In 1886, the name was changed to Newcastle East Public School.)

=== Schoolmasters of the school (Note: Records incomplete) ===
Ordinal	Name	Term start
1	Henry Wrensford	1816
2	Samuel Dell	1820
3	John Gabbage	1828
4	Richard Hill	1830
5	Joseph Spencer	1832
6	Elisha Hayes	1833
7	Henry Didsbury	1836
8	Alexander Flood	1837
9	George Felton	1840
10	Thomas Felton	1849
11	Alexander Flood	1850
12	Francis Shaw	1851
13	J. Robinson	1863
14	J. Hunt	1864
15	Levi Peak	1866
16	William Breyley	1878
17	W. Robinson	1882
