= Singleton High School =

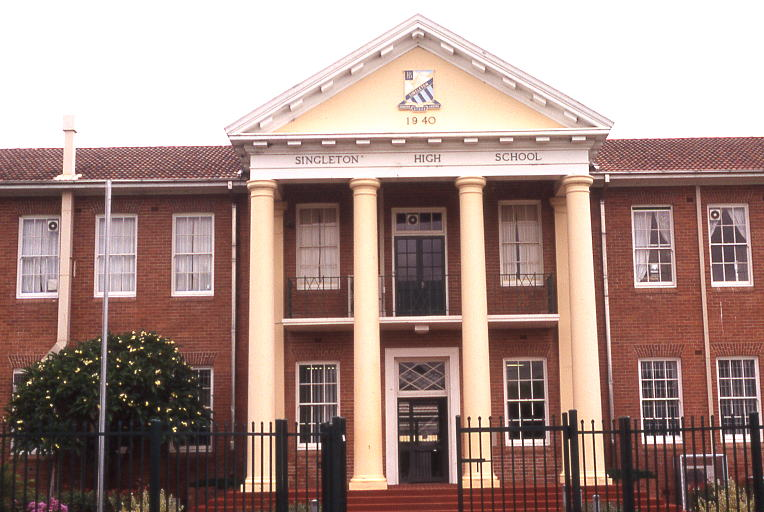
- Singleton High School, in 2009

Location
- Australia
- Coordinates: 32°34′07″S 151°10′36″E

Information
- Type: Government-funded co-educational comprehensive secondary day school
- Motto: Latin: Honore Atque Labore
- Established: 1940; 86 years ago
- School district: Upper Hunter; Regional North
- Educational authority: NSW Department of Education
- Principal: Liana Gill
- Teaching staff: 84.1 FTE (2018)
- Years: 7–12
- Enrolment: 1,161 (2018)
- Campus type: Regional
- Colours: Navy blue, light blue, and white
- Website: singleton-h.schools.nsw.gov.au

Singleton High School is a government-funded co-educational comprehensive secondary day school, located in Singleton, in the Hunter Valley of New South Wales, Australia.

Established in 1940, the school enrolled approximately 1,160 students in 2018, from Year 7 to Year 12, of whom 14 percent identified as Indigenous Australians and four percent were from a language background other than English. The school is operated by the NSW Department of Education; the principal is Liana Gill. Singleton High School is the second biggest high school in rural New South Wales.

== Overview ==
The high school is adjacent to the King Street Primary School, and on the same site as the Singleton Technical and Further Education (TAFE) Campus of the Hunter Institute of Technology. The school has a comprehensive curriculum offering a diverse range of traditional subjects and dual accredited vocational education courses within the school as well as providing access to TAFE delivered Vocational Education and Training (VET) courses at Singleton TAFE.

The school colours are royal blue and sky blue. The sporting houses are Burdekin (blue), Elliott (yellow), Howe (red) and Munro (green).

Singleton High School has a sister school in Takahata, Japan. Students also have opportunities to be involved in global excursions to Japan, USA and an Asian destination for cultural and community engagement tours. The Ka Wul Aboriginal Cultural Resource Centre has received National recognition for the embedded Aboriginal programs within the school.

== See also ==
- List of government schools in New South Wales: Q–Z
- List of schools in the Hunter and Central Coast
- Education in Australia
