= Beckers Bridge =

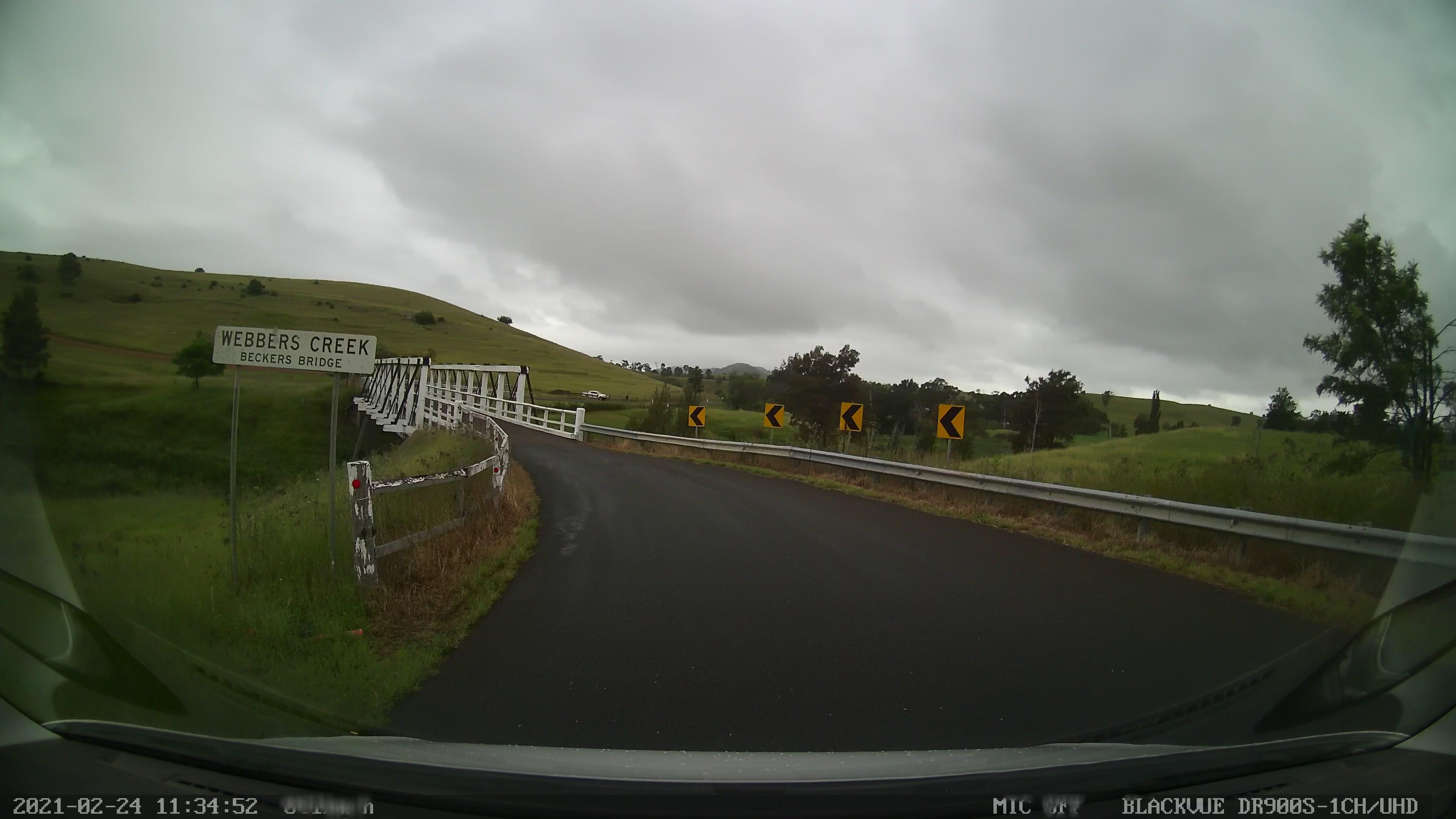
- Approaching the bridge from the south, 2021
- Coordinates: 32°31′09″S 151°21′08″E
- Carries: Main Road
- Crosses: Webbers Creek
- Locale: Glendon Brook, New South Wales, Australia
- Owner: Transport for NSW

Characteristics
- Design: Truss bridge
- Material: Timber
- Total length: 45.4 metres (149 ft)
- Width: 4.6 metres (15 ft)
- Longest span: 27.7 metres (91 ft)
- No. of spans: One

History
- Designer: Ernest de Burgh
- Construction cost: A£1,875
- Opened: 1902

New South Wales Heritage Register
- Official name: Beckers Bridge over Webbers Creek
- Type: State heritage (built)
- Designated: 20 June 2000
- Reference no.: 1457
- Type: Road Bridge
- Category: Transport - Land
- Builders: W. T. Oakes, Sydney

Beckers Bridge is a heritage-listed timber truss road bridge that carries Main Road across Webbers Creek, located in Glendon Brook, New South Wales, Australia. It was designed by Ernest de Burgh. The bridge is owned by Transport for NSW.

== History ==
=== Timber truss bridges ===
Timber truss road bridges have played a significant role in the expansion and improvement of the New South Wales road network. Prior to the bridges being built, river crossings were often dangerous in times of rain, which caused bulk freight movement to be prohibitively expensive for most agricultural and mining produce. Only the high priced wool clip of the time was able to carry the costs and inconvenience imposed by the generally inadequate river crossings that often existed prior to the trusses construction.

Timber truss bridges were preferred by the Public Works Department from the mid 19th to the early 20th century because they were relatively cheap to construct, and used mostly local materials. The financially troubled governments of the day applied pressure to the Public Works Department to produce as much road and bridge work for as little cost as possible, using local materials. This condition effectively prohibited the use of iron and steel, as these, prior to the construction of the steel works at Newcastle in the early 20th century, had to be imported from England.

Ernest de Burgh, the designer of DeBurgh truss and other bridges, was a leading engineer with the Public Works Department, and a prominent figure in early 20th century NSW.

Timber truss bridges, and timber bridges generally were so common that NSW was known to travellers as the "timber bridge state".

=== Beckers Bridge ===
The bridge was advertised for tender in 1901, with W. T. Oakes the successful contractor with a tender of A£1,875, and completed in 1902. It replaced the need to cross the river at water-level, which had been dangerous at higher levels.

A 2011 report profiling timber truss road bridges found that Beckers Bridge could not be upgraded to a required standard and would need to be replaced. Following this, the 2012 Roads and Maritime Services Timber Truss Bridge Conservation Strategy identified Beckers Bridge as a target to be removed and replaced in the future. It stated that, although all submissions received had been in support of its retention, it could not meet the load requirements necessary for the route and described it as "an unremarkable example of its type".

In 2017, Michael Johnsen, the local MP in the New South Wales Legislative Assembly, published a call for feedback on the design and alignment of a new bridge, after the completion of which the original bridge would be demolished. On 7 March 2018, Roads & Maritime Services requested that it be delisted from the State Heritage Register to allow for its demolition. However, in November 2019 its successor body, Transport for NSW, added the bridge to its conservation list and pledged to preserve it for the future.

== Description ==
Becker's Bridge is a DeBurgh type timber truss road bridge. It has a single timber truss span of 27.7 metres (91 ft). There is a single timber approach span at each end giving the bridge an overall length of 45.4 metres (149 ft).

The superstructure is supported by timber trestles and provides a carriage way with a minimum width of 4.6 metres (15 ft). The guard rail is of timber post and rail construction and extends the full length of the bridge.

== Heritage listing ==
Completed in 1902, Beckers Bridge is an early example of a DeBurgh timber truss road bridge. In 1998 it was in good condition. As a timber truss road bridge, it has many associational links with important historical events, trends, and people, including the expansion of the road network and economic activity throughout NSW, and Ernest DeBurgh, the designer of this type of truss. DeBurgh trusses were fourth in the five stage design evolution of NSW timber truss road bridges. Designed by Public Works engineer Ernest M. DeBurgh, the DeBurgh truss is an adaptation of the American Pratt truss design. The DeBurgh truss is the first to use significant amounts of steel and iron, and did so in spite of its high cost and the government's historical preference for timber.

DeBurgh trusses were significant technical improvements over their predecessors. Situated in the Hunter region, Beckers bridge gains heritage significance because of its proximity to 15 other historic bridges, each constructed before 1905. In 1998 there were 10 surviving DeBurgh trusses in NSW of the 20 built, and 82 timber truss road bridges survive from the over 400 built. The Beckers bridge is a representative example of DeBurgh timber truss road bridges, and is assessed as being State significant, primarily on the basis of its technical and historical significance.

Beckers Bridge over Webbers Creek was listed on the New South Wales State Heritage Register on 20 June 2000 having satisfied the following criteria.

The place is important in demonstrating the course, or pattern, of cultural or natural history in New South Wales.

Through the bridge's association with the expansion of the NSW road network, its ability to demonstrate historically important concepts such as the gradual acceptance of NSW people of American design ideas, and its association with Ernest DeBurgh, it has historical significance.

The place is important in demonstrating aesthetic characteristics and/or a high degree of creative or technical achievement in New South Wales.

The bridge exhibits the technical excellence of its design, as all of the structural detail is clearly visible. In the context of its landscape it is visually attractive. As such, the bridge has a small amount of aesthetic significance.

The place has a strong or special association with a particular community or cultural group in New South Wales for social, cultural or spiritual reasons.

Timber truss bridges are prominent to road travellers, and NSW has in the past been referred to as the "timber truss bridge state". Through this, the complete set of bridges gain some social significance, as they could be said to be held in reasonable esteem by many travellers in NSW.

The place possesses uncommon, rare or endangered aspects of the cultural or natural history of New South Wales.

The bridge is rare - an early example of DeBurgh trusses.

The place is important in demonstrating the principal characteristics of a class of cultural or natural places/environments in New South Wales.

The bridge is representative of DeBurgh truss bridges.

== See also ==
- List of bridges in Australia
