= Robert M. Douglas (doctor) =

Australian medical doctor and epidemiologist (born 1936)

Robert Matheson Douglas
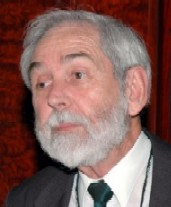
- Born: 8 December 1936 (age 89); South Australia
- Education: University of Adelaide
- Occupations: Physician and professor
- Years active: 1959–2001
- Employer: The Australian National University
- Known for: Founder, Australia 21
- Board member of: Public Health Association of Australia; Australasian Epidemiological Association; Australia 21
- Awards: Officer of the Order of Australia

Robert Matheson Douglas AO (born 8 December 1936) is an Australian medical doctor and epidemiologist. He studied medicine at the University of Adelaide, graduating in 1959. In 1968, he took up a position as Specialist Physician and Deputy Medical Superintendent of the Port Moresby hospital in Papua New Guinea.

== Early and personal life ==
He was born to Rev. John and Ruth Douglas and was the second of three boys. He attended Newcastle Boys High School and later Fort Street High School in Sydney. He is married to Rosemary with three children and 13 grandchildren.

== Career ==
In Papua New Guinea, he developed an interest in respiratory infections particularly the prevention of pneumonia, which led to work in the US on licensure of pneumococcal vaccine. This interest led to a position with the World Health Organization, working on programs to reduce child deaths from pneumonia. After working as an academic in public health he became Dean of Medicine at the University of Adelaide, and later Director of the National Centre for Epidemiology and Population Health, and Coordinating Editor of the Acute Respiratory Infections Group of the Cochrane Collaboration. He is a former President of the Public Health Association of Australia and of the Australasian Epidemiological Association.

== Community ==
In 2001, after retiring as Emeritus Professor at the Australian National University, he founded Australia 21, a non-profit organization. From 2002 to 2012, he was Chairman of the Board and director. With the Nature and Society Forum, he helped to develop SEE-Change, an NGO in Canberra that works to enable Australians to connect with each other and the environment. He is a committed environmentalist.

== Honours ==
In recognition of his contribution to medicine, particularly respiratory disease and the development of public health training in Australia, he was made an Officer of the Order of Australia in 2000.

In 2006, he was nominated as the Australian of the Year.

In October 2008, he received the ACT Conservation Council's Supreme Green Hero award.

In April 2011, he was named the ACT Environmental Volunteer of the Year.
