= Kelver Hartley =

Australian academic

- Born: 11 February 1909; Adelaide, South Australia
- Died: 26 February 1988 (aged 79); Glebe, New South Wales
- Education: University of Sydney
- Occupation: academic
- Employer: University of Newcastle
- Known for: foundation professor of French, University of Newcastle

Kelver Hayward Hartley Jones (11 February 1909 – 26 February 1988) was an Australian academic and the foundation professor of French at the University of Newcastle.

== Early life and career ==
Kelver Hartley was born Kelver Hayward Hartley Jones in Wayville, South Australia on 11 February 1909. His parents were Frank Hartley Jones (1877-1958), an accountant, and his wife Clara Mary Vickery. He was an only child. He attended Sydney High School and the University of Sydney, where he studied French and from which he graduated with a B.A., majoring in French, in 1930 and an M.A. in 1932.

After graduation, he taught at secondary schools in New South Wales. In 1933, he won a scholarship from the French government, which enabled him to undertake research for a doctorate at the Sorbonne in Paris, France, for two years. He chose to research the "French influences in the writings of Oscar Wilde" and, while so doing, conducted interviews with André Gide and Lord Alfred Douglas, following which he successfully defended his thesis titled Oscar Wilde, l'influence française dans son oeuvre.

After his return to Australia in 1935, Hartley joined the Department of French at the University of Sydney for two years (1938–40) as Acting Assistant Lecturer and then taught for twenty years in New South Wales secondary schools (including Sydney Boys' High School, Newcastle Boys' High School, Armidale High School and Sydney Technical High School).

== University of Newcastle ==
In 1955, he was appointed to the post of Senior Lecturer and Head of Department in French at the Newcastle University College in the city of Newcastle, New South Wales and was promoted to Associate Professor in 1962.

In 1965, when the Newcastle University College became the University of Newcastle, he was appointed as the Foundation Professor of French there, occupying that Chair until he retired in 1969. During those years he was recognised as Australia's foremost expert on "comparative Franco-Italian and Franco-Spanish literary styles".

== Select bibliography ==
- Oscar Wilde: l'influence française dans son œuvre: thèse pour le doctorat d'Université, Paris: Librairie du "Recueil Sirey", 1935.
- Fifty French Proses : For Leaving Certificate Course (3rd to 5th Year) : With Vocabulary, Sydney: Shakespeare Head Press, c. 1946. Joint author: C. R. Goffet (Charles Goffet)
- Bandello and the Heptameron: A Study in Comparative Literature, Melbourne University Press on behalf of the Australian Humanities Research Council, 1960.
- Hermsprong de Robert Bage: un roman philosophique anglais, Paris: Marcel Didier, n.d. Note:Extrait de Revue de littérature comparée.
- The Haunting of Dr McCuaig, Mount Nebo, Queensland.: Boombana Publications, 1997. Edited and presented by Kenneth R. Dutton.
- Eerie Tales, Mount Nebo, Queensland: Boombana Publications, c. 2001. Edited and presented by Kenneth R. Dutton.
