= Scone High School =

Location
- Scone, New South Wales; Australia; 32°03′27″S 150°52′20″E

Information
- Type: Government-funded co-educational comprehensive secondary day school
- Motto: Latin: Age Bene Partem (Play Your Part Well)
- Established: 1889; 137 years ago
- School district: Upper Hunter; Regional North
- Educational authority: NSW Department of Education
- Principal: Brian Drewe
- Teaching staff: 36.1 FTE (2018)
- Years: 7–12
- Enrolment: 351 (2018)
- Campus type: Regional
- Colours: Navy blue, white and maroon
- Website: scone-h.schools.nsw.gov.au

Scone High School is a government-funded co-educational comprehensive secondary day school, located in the town of Scone, in the Upper Hunter Valley of New South Wales, Australia.

Established in 1889, the school enrolled approximately 350 students in 2018, from Year 7 to Year 12, of whom eleven percent identified as Indigenous Australians and two percent were from a language background other than English. The school is operated by the NSW Department of Education; the principal is Brian Drewe.

The school's catchment area covers Scone, Aberdeen, Murrurundi and surrounding areas including Denman.

== Notable alumni ==
- Darren Albert – rugby league player; represented Newcastle Knights, St. Helens and Cronulla Sharks
- Todd Lowrie – rugby league player; represented Parramatta Eels
- John Morris – rugby league player; represented Newcastle Knights, Parramatta Eels, Wests Tigers and Cronulla Sharks
- Dane Tilse – rugby league player; represented Canberra Raiders

== See also ==
- List of government schools in New South Wales: Q–Z
- List of schools in the Hunter and Central Coast
- Education in Australia
