= Newcastle East Public School =

Location
- Newcastle, New South Wales; Australia; 32.9300°S 151.7771°E

Information
- Type: New South Wales Public School
- Established: 1 April 1883; 143 years ago
- Principal: Mike McCann
- Enrolment: ~195
- Campus: Urban
- Colours: maroon, grey
- Website: newcastlee-p.schools.nsw.gov.au

Newcastle East Public School is a public school located in the New South Wales town of Newcastle, Australia. It is the oldest running school in Australia, established in 1816 by a convict on conditional pardon, Henry Wrensford. The current site of school, located in the suburb of Newcastle on the corner of Tyrrell and Brown Streets, dates back to 1878.

== History of the school ==
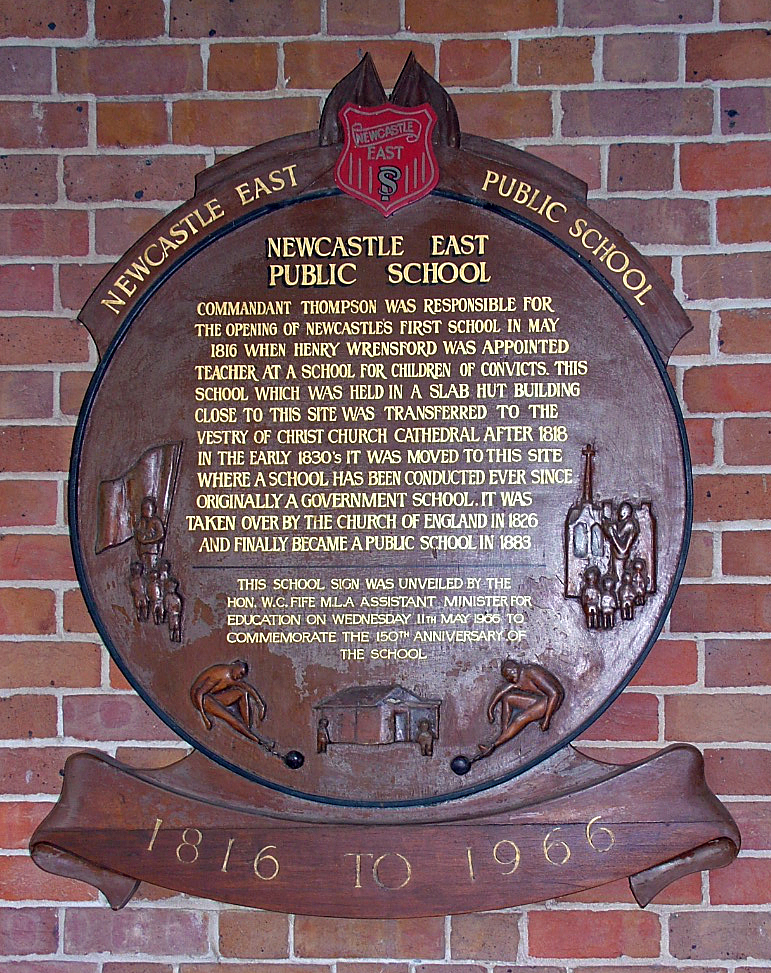
Plaque on the verandah dedicated to 150 years of operation

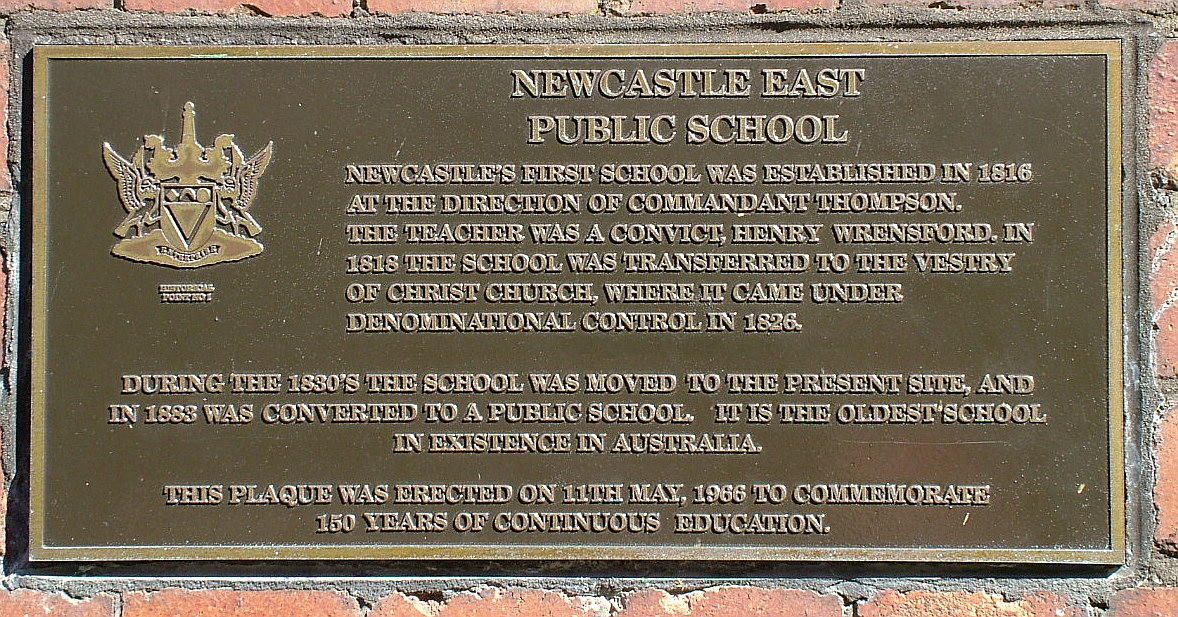
Plaque commemorating the original location of the school. Located on the corner of Church and Bolton streets

Newcastle East Public School is the oldest school in continuous operation in Australia. Eddie Braggett has validated this continuity since its formation in 1816 by Henry Wrensford, finding conclusively that the school has accepted pupils every year since its inception.

Henry Wrensford was a twenty-six-year-old convict when he was convicted of fraud and sentenced to seven years’ transportation. It was only two years later in 1814 that he was granted a conditional pardon by Governor Lachlan Macquarie, with his occupation recorded as "schoolmaster"; perhaps owing more to his military connections than any such experience or aptitude. Wrensford started the school in May 1816 with eight girls and nine boys attending, aged from three to thirteen. Lessons took place in one of the government-owned slab huts that stretched along the bottom of the hill now occupied by Bolton Street and its whereabouts. At this time, the settlement consisted of no more than 400 people, mostly convicts, and the students were the children of these. Macquarie himself directed that the Commandant "give it every possible support and encouragement it being highly approved of by the governor as a most benevolent and praiseworthy institution".

Captain James Wallis, who presided over an expansive building programme in Newcastle, including the breakwater from mainland to Nobbys Island, designed Christ Church which was completed in August 1818. Some time that year, Wrensford's school was moved to a vestry of the church, and the Newcastle School soon acquired the name Christ Church School.

Four years later in 1820, Wrensford became a free man and left the school, being replaced by another convict Samuel Dell. The control of the school was changed from the government to the church during 1826. As the school continued to grow there became a need for a new site and the school moved to the corner of Church and Bolton Streets.

In 1859, an additional school was opened to satisfy the needs of parents who wanted a government controlled school. Newcastle Public School was opened in Brown Street in the basement of the Congregational Church, after which it moved to a classroom opposite the current site. In 1878, the school moved to the current site in Tyrrell Street. The success of this new public school led the state government to take control of the church school in 1883 and name it Newcastle East Public School.

The teachers, parents and children of Newcastle East Public School hold a colonial fair every two years to celebrate the history of the school and school site.

== The school house ==
The predominant feature of the site is the original school house, which has undergone renovations since its development but remains almost true to its original design. This impressive edifice was built in 1878 by architect George Allen Mansfield and is listed by the New South Wales State Heritage Register. The one-storey building is built from brick with stone cellar and a Gothic pitch roof made of corrugated iron.

The theme of the building is set by lancet windows; slim and pointed at the top as in the Gothic style, they are complemented by arched borders that protrude from the brickwork. Decorative gables and bargeboards fringe the pitched slate roof on all sides of the building. A tall spire, two chimneys and numerous decorative finials once lined the top of the roof but have been damaged or lost over the years and were not included in the restorations. The rooms are large with high pitched ceilings that show solid timber rafters.

== History of the school site ==
Newcastle Public School circa 1879

The Foundation Stone for the building was laid by Clarence Hannell, who was at the time the president of the local school board, on the Prince of Wales' birthday, Saturday, 9 November 1878. The ceremony was performed at midday by placing a glass jar beneath the stone. The jar contained four newspapers and a document inscribed with details of the ceremony and the names of relevant dignitaries such as the headmaster, M. Willis, Jr.

On 20 November 1879, Hannell officially opened the building as Newcastle Public School before a "very large and fashionable audience in the large schoolroom of the building". The man responsible for the design was the celebrated architect George Allen Mansfield, who was architect to the Council of Education from 1867 to 1879, building a series of single storey suburban schools in that time, all in the Gothic Revival style. The final cost of this construction was 10 000 pounds.

The original purpose for this newly built building was to house the Newcastle Public School, a school that was established in 1859 in nearby Brown Street. At this time the school consisted of boys’, girls’, infants’, and babies’ rooms and accommodated over eight hundred students.

In 1880, the school became a Superior Public School, reaching a peak of over 1000 students in 1884. The school on Bolton Street was enlarged soon after and other schools opened, causing a drop in enrolments.

In 1906 and within the same confines, the Hill High School was established in the westernmost classroom. As the only high school in Newcastle at the time, it continued after Newcastle Public School was closed in 1911. The high school enrolled over 300 students by 1912. In 1929, Newcastle Girls' High School began its separate existence at Hamilton and the Hill High School became Newcastle Boys' High School. In 1934, they moved to a site in Waratah, and the site housed Newcastle Boys' Junior High School until 1973 when it was closed.

From 1974 to 1981 the site was used by the Society of Artists and other small groups to hold workshops. Renovations then commenced, as the building was in a state of disrepair. Newcastle East Public School, at the time located down the hill in Bolton Street, was to be the new tenant. The school's first day of teaching at the site was on 13 September 1982.

The architect responsible for renovations conducted during the 1980s was heritage architect John Carr. The original building, and the school, has won several architectural awards for its outstanding renovations, including a national award for the refurbishment of an historic building and is listed by the National Trust as a building of cultural significance.

== Modifications to the site ==
Since the Tyrrell Street school originally opened as Newcastle Public School in 1878, it had endured over one hundred years of alterations and patchwork of different style that detracted from its original grandeur. The result was a building featuring many different architectural styles. Before it could be reopened as Newcastle East Public school in 1982, major renovations were conducted to restore the building to as near its original glory as money would allow. The architect in charge of the project was John Carr, who worked with the philosophy that it was better to repair than replace. A restoration project by the Public Works Department was conducted in mid-1981. Worth around $850,000, it saw the demolition of unsympathetic additions and the uncovering of the building's fine brickwork.

To ensure authenticity the tradesmen involved strived to learn new skills that hadn't been used in generations. Old bricks, salvaged from demolished buildings in the area, were used in the restoration of two sets of windows. The building originally had four arched windows; however these were replaced in 1914 by larger arched windows. The reconstruction of these windows was part of the restoration project. Deteriorated samples of the paintwork were studied in order to duplicate the original colours. The roof was restored to its original state using tools that had been used for the original construction. 21 000 fibrous cement slate tiles were laid on the steep roof.

Other modification included the inclusion of more modern facilities that were missing from the schools original design but necessary for the site to function as a modern school. These facilities included a large playground, an activities area, an audiovisual room and a library, carpets, heating and modern furniture.

The school has a ceiling of 195 enrolments in 2007 as compared to numbers close to 70 in 1994. With this expansion has come the need to install demountables. These detract from the historic value of the site and although meant as a temporary measure there is currently no plans in place for a new building.

There are some obvious differences between the original construction of the building and its restoration, probably owing to cost. The large chimneys were not kept for the restoration, although the fireplaces were kept, and the spire is no longer on the building. According to current members of the school community it may have fallen off the building in 1967. There are also some ornamental differences, such as the decorative finials that once lined the top of the roof and were not included in the restorations. Another significant difference is the verandah on the north side that has replaced an enclosed entry with a parapet, a row of eight lancet windows and the insignia of the school above a large arched front door.

== See also ==
- Newcastle, New South Wales
- Newcastle High School
- List of government schools in New South Wales
