= Timor, New South Wales =

Locality in New South Wales

Timor
- Town
- Interactive map of Timor
- Coordinates: 31.75°S 151.08°E
- Country: Australia
- State: New South Wales
- LGA: Upper Hunter Shire

Government
  - State electorate: Upper Hunter
  - Federal division: New England

Population
  - Total: 55 (SAL 2016)
Localities around Timor
| Wallabadah | Crawney |
| Scotts Creek | Timor | Pages Creek |
| Green Creek | Waverly |

Timor is a locality in the Hunter Valley region of New South Wales, Australia. It is in the Upper Hunter Shire.

It had a public school from 1879 to 1935. St Peter's Anglican Church opened around 1883, and closed in 2015. It increased from one to two services per month in 1901.

Timor was host to silver mines in the 1870s, although it is unclear if they were ever profitable.

There are limestone caves in Timor. At least one is home to Eastern bent-wing bats.
