= Glendon Brook, New South Wales =

Glendon Brook
- Town
- Coordinates: 32°31′20″S 151°20′00″E
- Country: Australia
- State: New South Wales
- LGA: Singleton Council
- Location: 23 km (14 mi) NE of Singleton

Government
  - State electorate: Upper Hunter
  - Federal division: Hunter

Population
  - Total: 266 (2016 census)
- Postcode: 2330

Glendon Brook is a locality in the Singleton Council region of New South Wales, Australia. It has also been known as Glendonbrook. It had a population of 266 as of the 2016 census.

Glendon Brook Public School opened in November 1878 and closed in December 1950.

Glendonbrook Post Office opened in 1874 and closed on 31 August 1976.

The Glendon Brook Hall opened in 1936. It continues to be used for community events.

St Paul's Catholic Church at Glendon Brook celebrated its 125th anniversary in 2014.

== Heritage listings ==
Glendon Brook has a number of heritage-listed sites, including:

- 128 Main Road: Beckers Bridge over Webbers Creek
