= Newcastle Boys' High School =

School in New South Wales, Australia

Location
- Turton Road, Waratah; Newcastle, New South Wales, 2298; Australia; 32°54′23.9″S 151°43′38.5″E

Information
- Type: Public, selective, single-sex, secondary, day school
- Motto: Latin: Remis Velisque (With Oars and Sails)
- Established: 1929; 97 years ago at Newcastle East; 1934; 92 years ago at Waratah
- Status: Closed
- Closed: December 1976; 49 years ago
- Years offered: 7–12
- Gender: Boys
- Campus type: Urban
- Houses: Hannell; Hunter; Shortland; Smith
- Colours: Red and blue
- Song: Remis Velisque
- Communities served: Lower Hunter Region
- House names
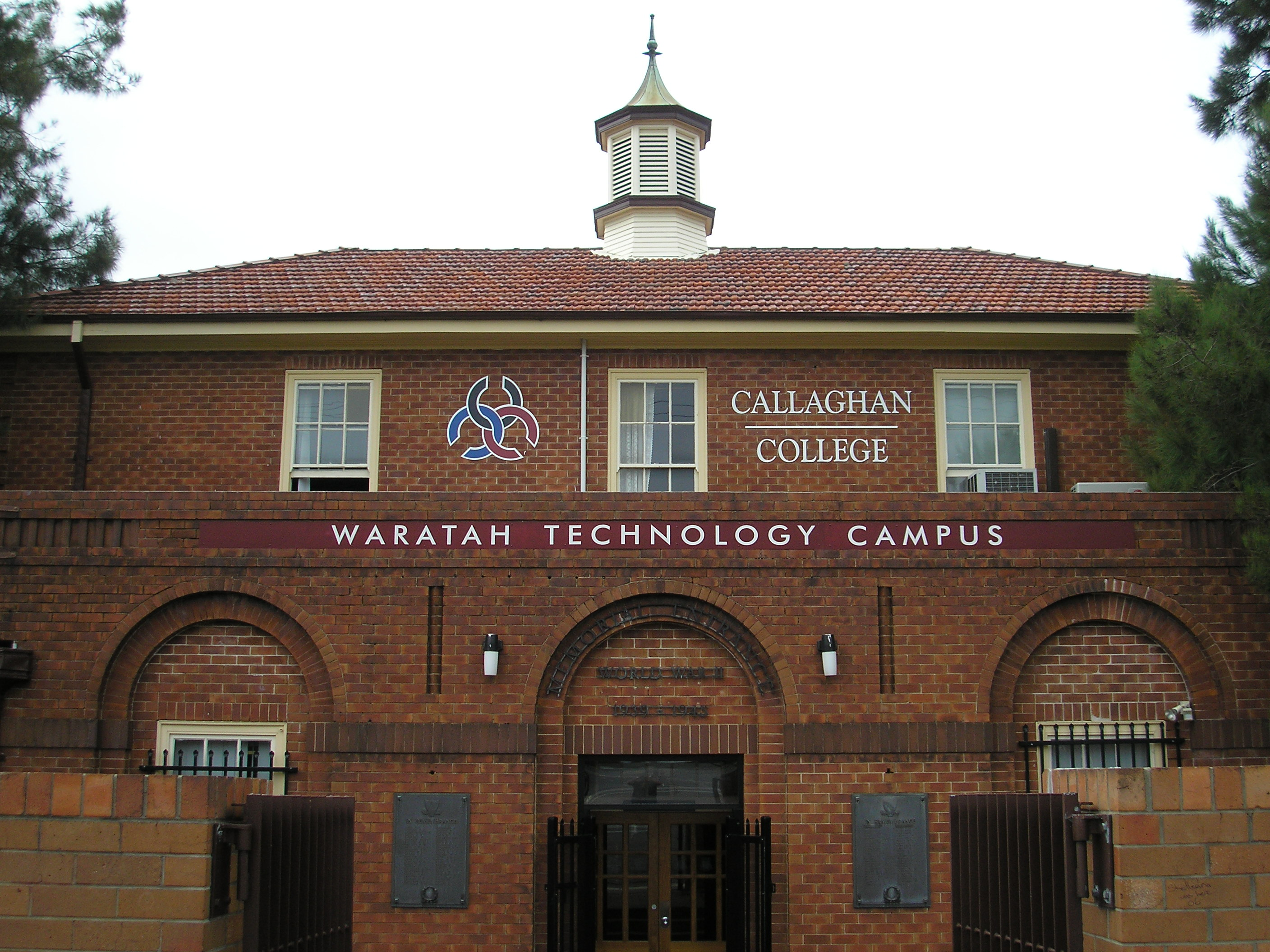
- Entrance to the original building in 2007. The school is now known as Callaghan College Waratah Campus.

Newcastle Boys' High School was a government-funded single-sex selective high school, located in Waratah, a suburb of Newcastle, New South Wales, Australia. The school was active between 1929 and 1976, after which time it became a co-educational non-selective school.

== History ==
Newcastle Boys High School was established in 1929 when the Hill High School was split into two selective single-sex schools, the other being Newcastle Girls High School. Hill High School's campus was located on Newcastle Hill, at a site now occupied by Newcastle East Public School, and was referred to as "the School on the Hill". Newcastle Girls High School moved to a new campus in Hamilton, and Newcastle Boys High School moved to a new campus in Waratah in 1934, at which time Hill High School became Newcastle Junior Boys High School. Both Newcastle Boys and Newcastle Girls high schools carried on the traditions established by the original school, including use of the same motto and school colours.

Newcastle Boys High School became non-selective and co-educational in 1977 and changed its name to Waratah High School that same year. Later it became Waratah Technology High School, and then Waratah Technology Campus of Callaghan College in 2000.

== Headmasters ==
The Headmasters of Newcastle Boys High School were:

- 1930–31 Robert Frederick Harvey
- 1932–34 Charles Herbert Christmas
- 1935–44 Norman Ross Mearns
- 1945–47 William Pillans
- 1948–63 Frank Harold Beard
- 1964–74 Leonard Thomas Richardson
- 1975–76 Victor Huish Webber (relieving)

== School song ==
Newcastle Boys High School continued to sing the Newcastle High School song: words by a member of staff, R. G. Henderson MA set to the tune of "D'ye ken John Peel?", chosen by competition announced in 1913 in the school journal, "Novocastrian". When the boys moved to the plain at the Waratah site, they no longer climbed up The Hill and the first verse was re-written in 1943 by Mr Hodge.

== Science scholarships ==
The following Newcastle Boys' High School students won scholarships to the Professor Harry Messel International Science School:

Year	Schoolboy
1962	Malcolm James Williams
1964	Peter Gordon Browne
1965	Ian Donald Henderson
1966	Grahame John Edgar
1967	Michael Duncan Daffey
1968	David Ian Cocking
1969	David Bruce Williams
1969	Graeme John Williams
1971	Danny James Llewellyn
1971	Ian Allen Watson
1973	Richard Kleeman
1973	Stephen Bruce Ticehurst
1974	John Ambler
1974	Dale Kleeman

== Extra-curricular activities ==
The following Newcastle Boys' High School boys were awarded "Blues" by the New South Wales Combined High Schools Sports Association under the system which operated from 1957 to 1980:

Year	Sport	Schoolboy
1960	Tennis	D Kelso
1960	Athletics	P Langley
1961	Tennis	P Marshall
1962	Basketball	D Collins
1962	Soccer	J Smith
1962	Soccer	J Thurlow
1962	Tennis	P Marshall
1963	Cricket	B Gibson
1963	Tennis	W Harrison
1964	Cricket	I Forrester
1964	Tennis	C East
1965	Athletics	P Wright
1967	Baseball	G Gilmour
1967	Rugby League	J Davis
1967	Rugby Union	J Davis
1968	Soccer	R O'Hearn
1969	Cricket	G Gilmour
1970	Rugby League	J Shield
1970	Soccer	G Valentine
1971	Basketball	T Antcliffe
1974	Basketball	G Logan
1974	Sailing	M Long

== Notable alumni ==
- Reginald Ian Barrett AO – jurist; Judge, Supreme Court of New South Wales (2001–2015)
- Jonathan Biggins – entertainer, writer
- Leigh Blackmore – horror writer, critic, editor, musician
- Peter Cave – journalist; Current Affairs Foreign Editor, Australian Broadcasting Corporation
- Peter Robert Charlton (1946–2007) – journalist, soldier, military historian; editor at The Courier-Mail from 1996
- William T. Cooper AO – artist and ornithologist
- Phil Cousins OAM – community worker, surf life-saver, mines rescue leader; Venerable Order of Saint John (2004), Centenary Medal (2003), named Open Champion (First Aid) Surf Life Saving Australia (1994 and 1997), Gold Medallion NSW Mines Rescue Service (1993)
- Julian Croft – novelist and poet; Emeritus Professor of English, University of New England
- Howard Crozier OAM (1936–) – teacher, education administrator, CSIRO manager, shire councillor, grazier
- Roger Dean CBE – Federal Member for Robertson 1949–64, Administrator of the Northern Territory 1964–70, diplomat
- Robert Douglas AO – medical practitioner and academic; chair, SEE-Change ACT; emeritus professor and visiting fellow, Australian National University; chair, Australia 21
- Gary Gilmour – Australian cricketer
- Ross Gittins AM – author; economics editor of The Sydney Morning Herald
- Kevan Gosper – international sports administrator; company director
- John Harding – violinist; former Concertmaster, Hong Kong Philharmonic Orchestra
- Sam Jones – trade unionist, politician; Labor member of New South Wales Legislative Assembly for Waratah (1965–84)
- Ross Kerridge – Lord Mayor of Newcastle (2024–2026)
- Patrick McGorry – psychiatrist, academic, 2010 Australian of the Year
- Jeffrey Miles – author, jurist; Chief Judge, Supreme Court of the Australian Capital Territory (1985–2002)
- Arthur Morris – Australian cricketer
- Peter Morris – Federal Minister; Federal Member for Shortland 1972–98
- Gary Neat – journalist and author; Foreign Correspondent ABC Indochina/SE Asia; CEO of the Queensland Liberal Party; Senate Candidate & Federal Executive; National President, Australian Institute of Management
- Dick Tooth – Australian rugby union footballer, orthopaedic surgeon and sports science pioneer
- Ivan Welsh – politician; Lake Macquarie mayor and member of New South Wales Legislative Assembly (1988–91)

== Notable teachers ==
- Kelver Hartley
