= Salisbury, New South Wales =

Salisbury New South Wales
- Coordinates: 32°13′S 151°34′E
- Population: 50 (SAL 2021)
- Location: 28 km (17 mi) NW of Dungog
- County: Durham

Salisbury is a village about 28 kilometres (17 mi) north west of Dungog, in New South Wales, Australia.
