= Callaghan College =

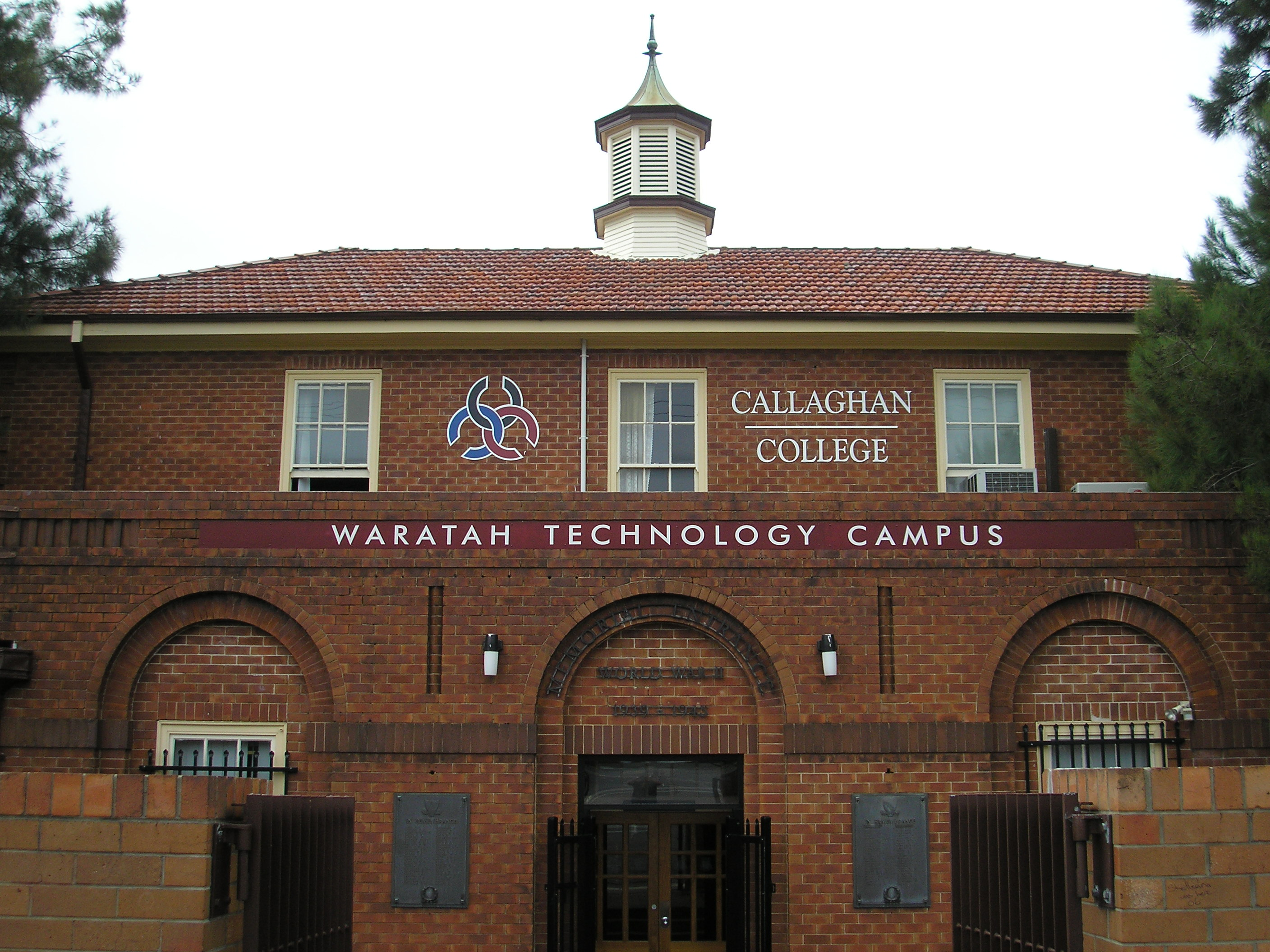
- Main entrance to the Waratah Technology Campus of Callaghan College

Location
- North-western Newcastle, New South Wales; Australia; 32°54′24″S 151°43′39″E

Information
- Former names: Jesmond High School; Newcastle Boys' High School; Wallsend High School; Waratah High School; Waratah Technology High School; Waratah Technology Campus
- Type: Government-funded co-educational comprehensive secondary day school
- Motto: Excellence, Respect, Responsibility
- Established: 28 June 2000; 26 years ago
- School district: Callaghan; Regional North, New South Wales
- Educational authority: New South Wales Department of Education
- College Principal: Kylee Owen
- Staff: ~300 (2018)
- Years: 7–10: Wallsend and Waratah; 11–12: Jesmond
- Enrolment: ~2,500 (2018)
- Campuses: Principal's Directorate: Leonora Parade, Waratah West; Jesmond Senior Campus: Janet Street, Jesmond; Wallsend Campus: Macquarie Street, Wallsend; Waratah Technology Campus: Turton Road, Waratah
- Campus type: Suburban
- Slogan: Collaborating to empower learners
- Communities served: Lower Hunter Region
- Affiliations: University of Newcastle; Hunter Institute of TAFE
- Website: callaghan-h.schools.nsw.gov.au

Callaghan College is a large multi-campus government-funded co-educational comprehensive secondary day school, located in the north-western corridor of Newcastle, New South Wales, Australia.

Established on 28 June 2000, the college operates across three campuses, with education for students in Year 7 to Year 10 delivered from both the Wallsend and Waratah campuses; and for students in Year 11 and Year 12 delivered from the Jesmond Senior campus. Before 2020, the Waratah campus operated as a specialist school for technology students.

In 2018, across all three campuses, the college had an enrolment of approximately 2,500 students, of whom thirteen percent identified as Indigenous Australians and thirteen percent were from a language background other than English. Across all three campuses, the 2300 students are supported by approximately 300 staff. The college is run and administered by the New South Wales Department of Education. The college Principal is Kylee Owen and each campus has a principal.

== History ==
A 1999 analysis of School Certificate and Higher School Certificate results and other data including demographic studies, enrolment and exit destination statistics at the Jesmond High School, Wallsend High School and Waratah High School, revealed many similarities and patterns of results. Following consultation with parents, citizens, staff and students, the Government of New South Wales made a decision to merge the three schools and establish Callaghan under a collegiate structure.

The Waratah Campus was originally occupied by Newcastle Boys' High School, a selective single sex high school for boys that operated on the site from 1934 to the end of 1976. At the beginning of 1976 the school became non-selective and co-educational for students in years 7–11, and in 1977 changed its name to Waratah High School. Later the name was changed to Waratah Technology High School, which persisted until the change to Waratah Technology Campus in 2000 upon the formation of Callaghan College. It changed names again in 2020 to just Waratah Campus. Despite numerous other changes, the school retains the original Newcastle Boys' High School house names of Hannell Devils (red), Hunter Tigers (yellow), Shortland Vipers (green), and Smith Sharks (blue).

At the start of 2020, a rebranding occurred. The old 3 ring logo was replaced with 3 white or navy blue circles. The campus main colours were changed: Jesmond – black to yellow, Wallsend – dark blue to a brighter blue and Waratah – maroon to a brighter red.

== See also ==
- List of government schools in New South Wales
- Education in Australia
