= Waratah, New South Wales =

Waratah
- Suburb
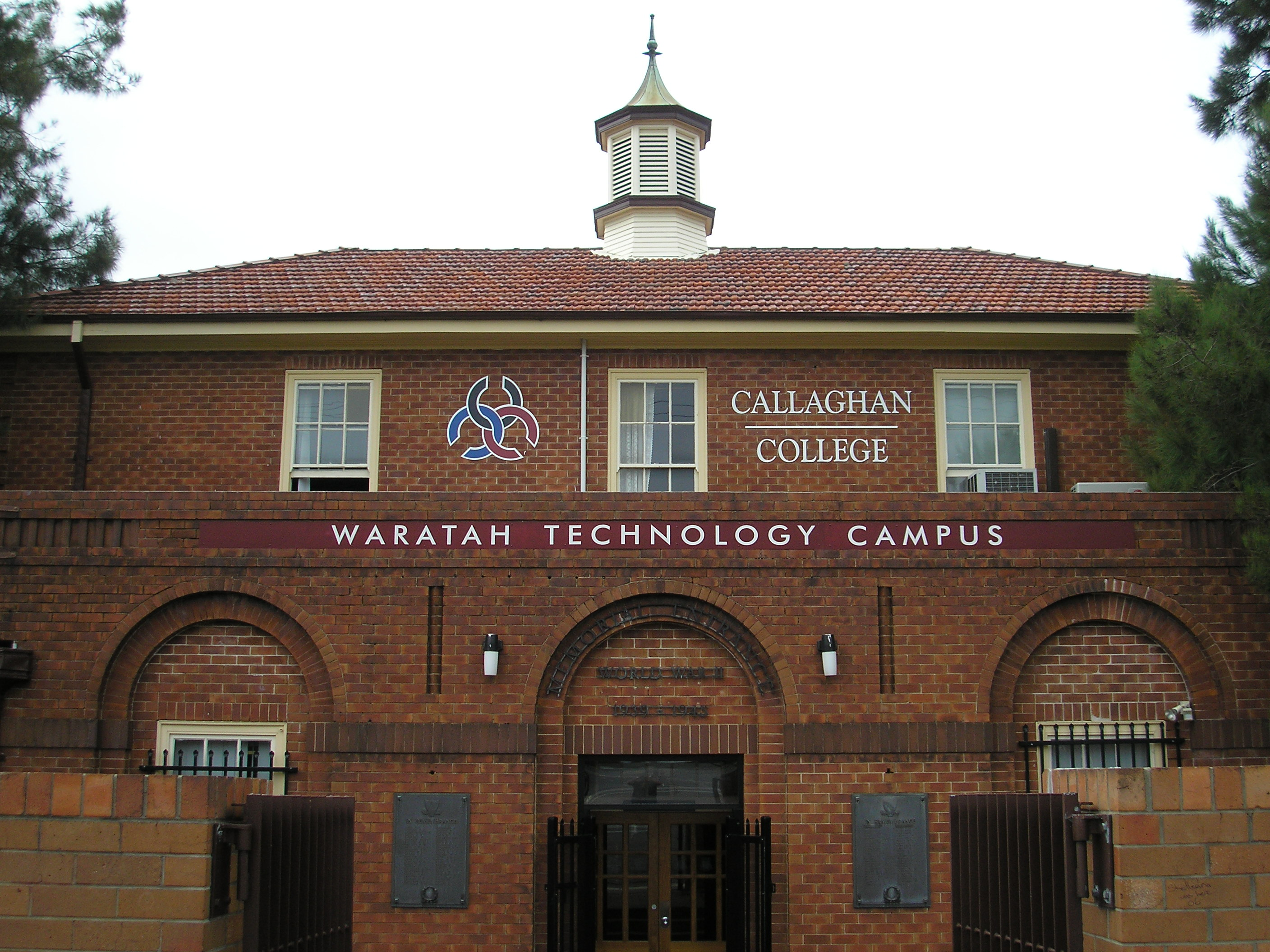
- Callaghan College, 2007. Previously Newcastle Boys' High School

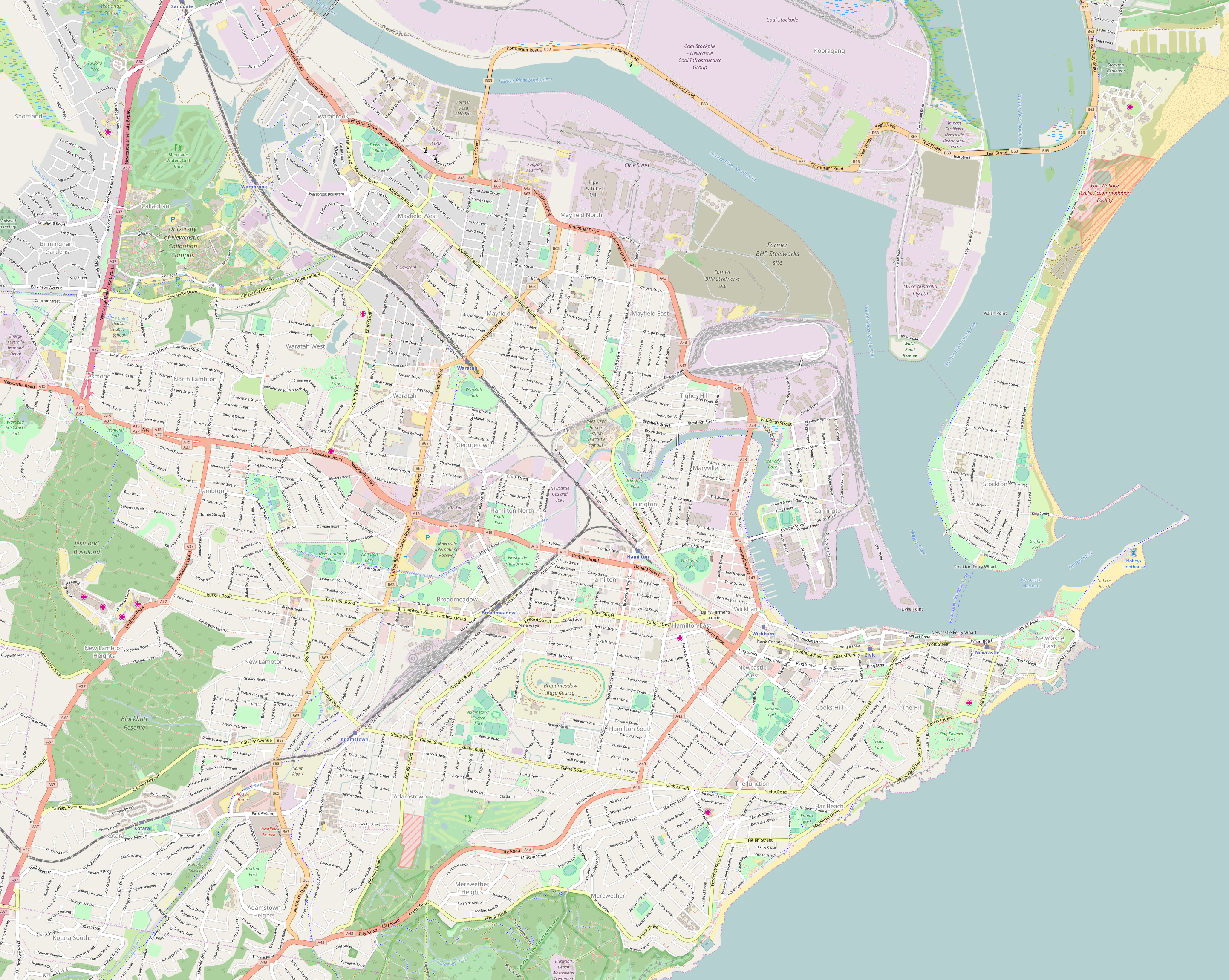
- Interactive map of Waratah
- Coordinates: 32°54′19″S 151°43′30″E
- Country: Australia
- State: New South Wales
- Region: Hunter
- City: Newcastle
- LGA: City of Newcastle (Ward 3)
- Location: 6 km (3.7 mi) WNW of Newcastle
- Established: 1871

Government
  - State electorates: Newcastle; Wallsend
  - Federal division: Newcastle

Area (Note: Area calculation is based on 1:100000 map 9232 NEWCASTLE.)
  - Total: 1.9 km^{2} (0.73 sq mi)

Population
  - Total: 4,927 (SAL 2021)
- Time zone: UTC+10 (AEST)
  - Summer (DST): UTC+11 (AEDT)
- Postcode: 2298
- County: Northumberland
- Parish: Newcastle
Suburbs around Waratah
Waratah West	Mayfield	Mayfield
Waratah West	Waratah	Georgetown
Lambton	Lambton	Broadmeadow

Waratah /ˌwɒrəˈtɑː/ is a north-western residential suburb of Newcastle, New South Wales, Australia, 6 kilometres (3.7 mi) from Newcastle's central business district and bounded to the north by the Main North railway line. Waratah station was opened in 1858 and is serviced by the Hunter line.

Along with adjacent Georgetown, Waratah was originally a working class area, with both suburbs having undergone significant gentrification since the early 2000s and are seen as a desirable inner suburbs with ample transport, road, school and shopping amenities.

== History ==
The first inhabitants of the land were the Awabakal people, who belong to the larger Awabagal/Gadjang subgroup, also called Worimi. Anthropologist Norman Tindale estimated that Awabakal territory covered about 1,800 km^{2}.

Waratah was once a major municipality in its own right, incorporated in 1871, with an elected council and mayor. Two notable mayors, both elected to the office three times each were John Scholey and auctioneer N.B.Creer, both of whom resided at North Waratah (now Mayfield, New South Wales). Scholey was instrumental in the establishment of the Waratah Bowling Club, of which he was also patron. Originally Waratah had a large colliery bearing its name as its industrial base.There was a private railway line that transported the mines production to the Port of Newcastle. Where coal is loaded onto bulk carries is still known as Port Waratah.

Nearby is a major 150+ bed independent retirement and nursing home, Maroba. A grant was given to Charles Simpson due to his service to the Port of Newcastle. Simpson has cleared and established a farm. The house was completed by 1848. He named the house after the native shrubs growing in abundance in the area.· The house was said to have been known as "Simpson’s Folly" because of the distance it was located from Newcastle and Simpson's habit of commuting by boat. ·In 1848 Charles Simpson secured three allotments on "The Folly". Simpson decided to call his property Waratah House that a bunch of Waratah flowers grew on the property. This also how the suburb got the name Waratah.· The property was sold to Major Charles Bolton after Mr. Simpson's death in 1850. Major Bolton decided to subdivide the land and gave to Mr Thomas Tourtle in 1860. Tourtle was a wealthy squatter on the land who made a fortune on his station. He lived in the property until he died in 1899. The house was demolished in 1993 to allow BHP to establish a pipe mill.

== Points of interest ==
=== Mater Hospital ===
The suburb contains a major acute hospital, the Calvary Mater Newcastle (formerly the Newcastle Mater Misericordiae Hospital), established by the Sisters of Mercy in 1921.

=== Waratah Village ===
Waratah Village Shopping Centre is located on Turton Road. It contains a Coles and Kmart (both of which operate each day through to midnight), a newsagent/post office and other specialty stores. Each holiday season Waratah Village is decorated with festive lights and billboards, Christmas music among other amenities.

=== The Royal Hotel & Town Hall Hotel ===
The Royal Hotel and Town Hotel are both pubs located on Station Street.

=== Waratah Railway Station ===
Waratah railway station is located at north-eastern boundary of the suburb. The station has two platforms serviced by the Hunter Line, going to each Maitland and Newcastle Interchange. Waratah Railway Station acts as a pedestrian bridge into neighbouring suburb Mayfield.

=== Schools ===
There are four schools located in Waratah:

- St. Philip's Christian College, Newcastle Campus (Years K–12),
- Callaghan College, Waratah Campus (Years 7–10),
- Waratah Public School (Years K–6)
- Corpus Christi Catholic Primary School (Years K–6).

=== Waratah Park ===
Waratah Park is a communal park next to Waratah Railway Station. It offers a children's playground, spots for extracurricular activities, pathways, gardens and a large oval. The pedestrian entrance gates to the park from Station Street are a heritage listed war memorial.

=== Other places and amenities ===
- Maroba Nursing Home
- Corpus Christi Catholic Church
- Mens Shed
- Hunter Prostate Cancer Alliance
- Waratah Police Station
- Newcastle Eye Hospital
- Tinonee Gardens aged care facility

== Waratah House ==
A grant was given to Charles Simpson due to his service to the Port of Newcastle. Simpson has cleared and established a farm. The house was completed by 1848. He named the house after the native shrubs growing in abundance in the area.· The house was said to have been known as "Simpson’s Folly" because of the distance it was located from Newcastle and Simpson's habit of commuting by boat. ·In 1848 Charles Simpson secured three allotments on "The Folly". Simpson decided to call his property Waratah House that a bunch of Waratah flowers grew on the property. This also how the suburb got the name Waratah.· The property was sold to Major Charles Bolton after Mr. Simpson's death in 1850. Major Bolton decided to subdivide the land and gave to Mr Thomas Tourtle in 1860. Tourtle was a wealthy squatter on the land who made a fortune on his station. He lived in the property until he died in 1899. The house was demolished in 1993 to allow BHP to establish a pipe mill.

== Deaf school in the 19th Century ==
In 1888, a nunnery was established by the Dominican Sisters in Waratah, which was used to teach deaf children. The foundation stone was laid on Rosary Sunday in 1888. From the 1950s, the number of nuns entering the convert was declining, azd by 1989, there were only 180 nuns. The Dominican Sisters also set up the smaller Corpus Christi school. In 1987, the nuns relinquished the leadership of the school. In 1875, the Dominican Nuns of Cabra sent deaf nun Mary Gabriel Hogan from Ireland to Australia to teach deaf children. The school was located on Alfred Street and was in operation from 1886 to 1979. It was the only Catholic school in Australasia which catered for deaf children. On 8 December 1875, Catherine Sullivan, from Bathurst, was the first student to enrol. Between 1875 and 1888, 17 girls and 13 boys were enrolled from all parts of Australia and New Zealand. In the 1920s, more than 200 girls and 100 boys attended the school. In 1922, the new St Gabriel's School for deaf boys in Castle Hill was created, and all boys were transferred from Waratah to that school. During the 1930s, the title of the school was changed from the Institution of the Deaf and Dumb to School for Deaf Girls. In 1938 Sister M Nobert O.P introduced a speech method in place of sign language. On 11 July 1948, a fire broke out in the girls' sleeping quarters and the school closed. It reopened in 1951. The school was mentioned in Commonwealth Government report titled "Why are they in children's homes: report of the ACOSS children's home intake survey in 1979", and was closed soon afterwards. After the closure, St Dominic's centre for hearing impaired children was opened in Mayfield.

== Gallery ==
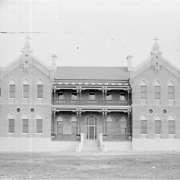
Rosary Convent, later School for deaf children, Alfred Street, c.1900

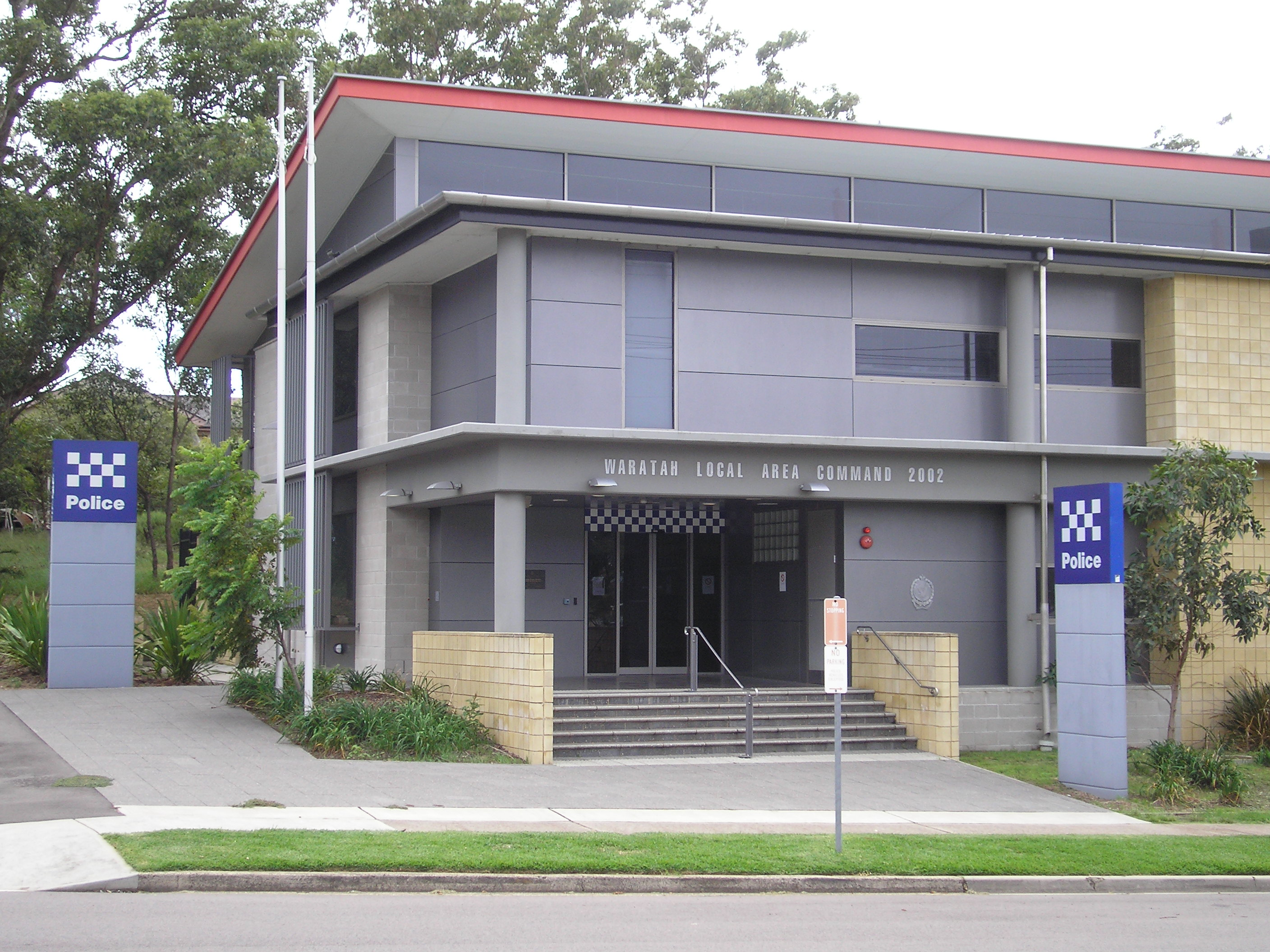
Waratah Police Station, Coolamin Road, 2007

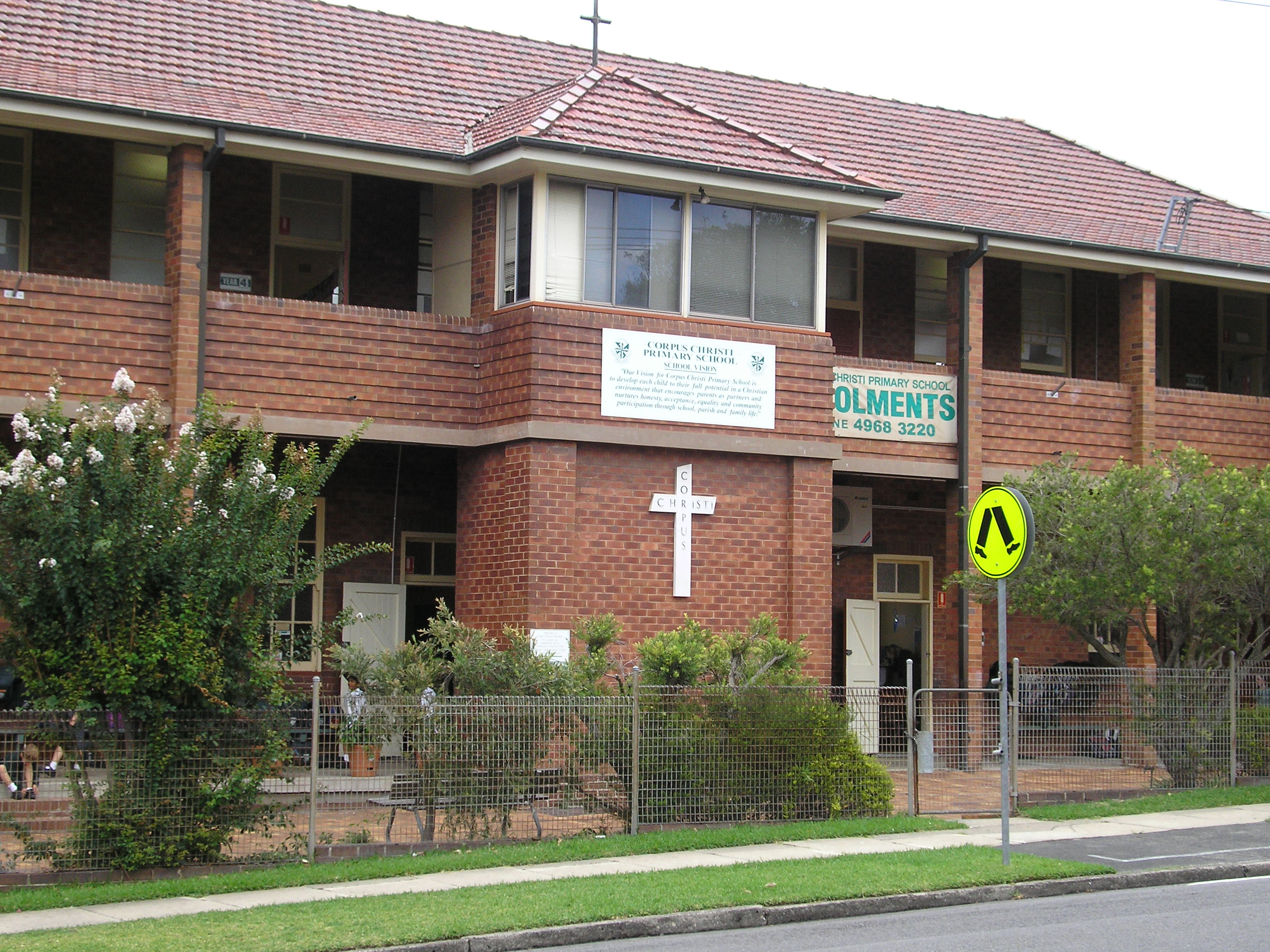
Corpus Christi Catholic Primary School, Platt Street, 2007

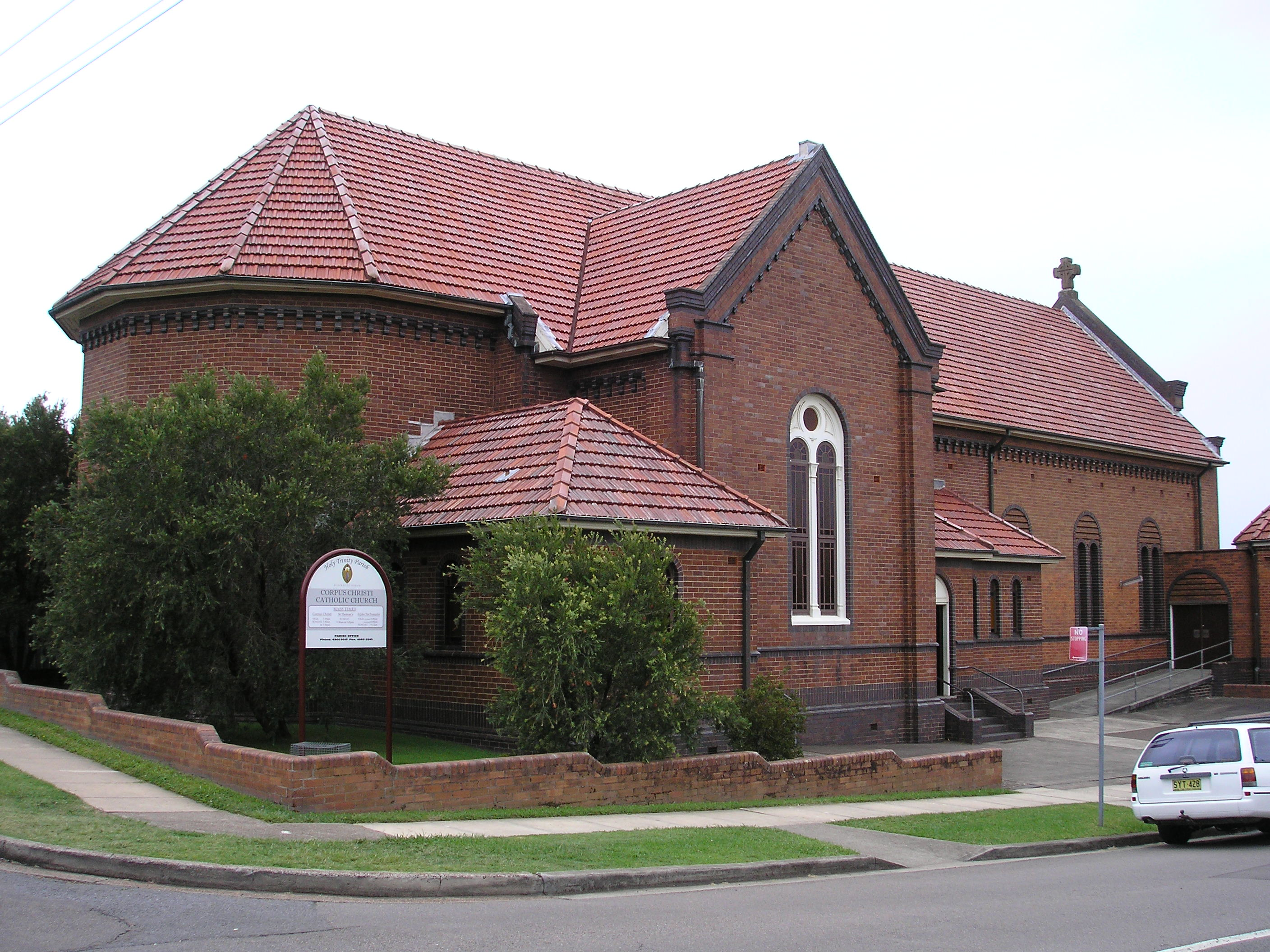
Corpus Christi Catholic Church, Platt Street, 2007

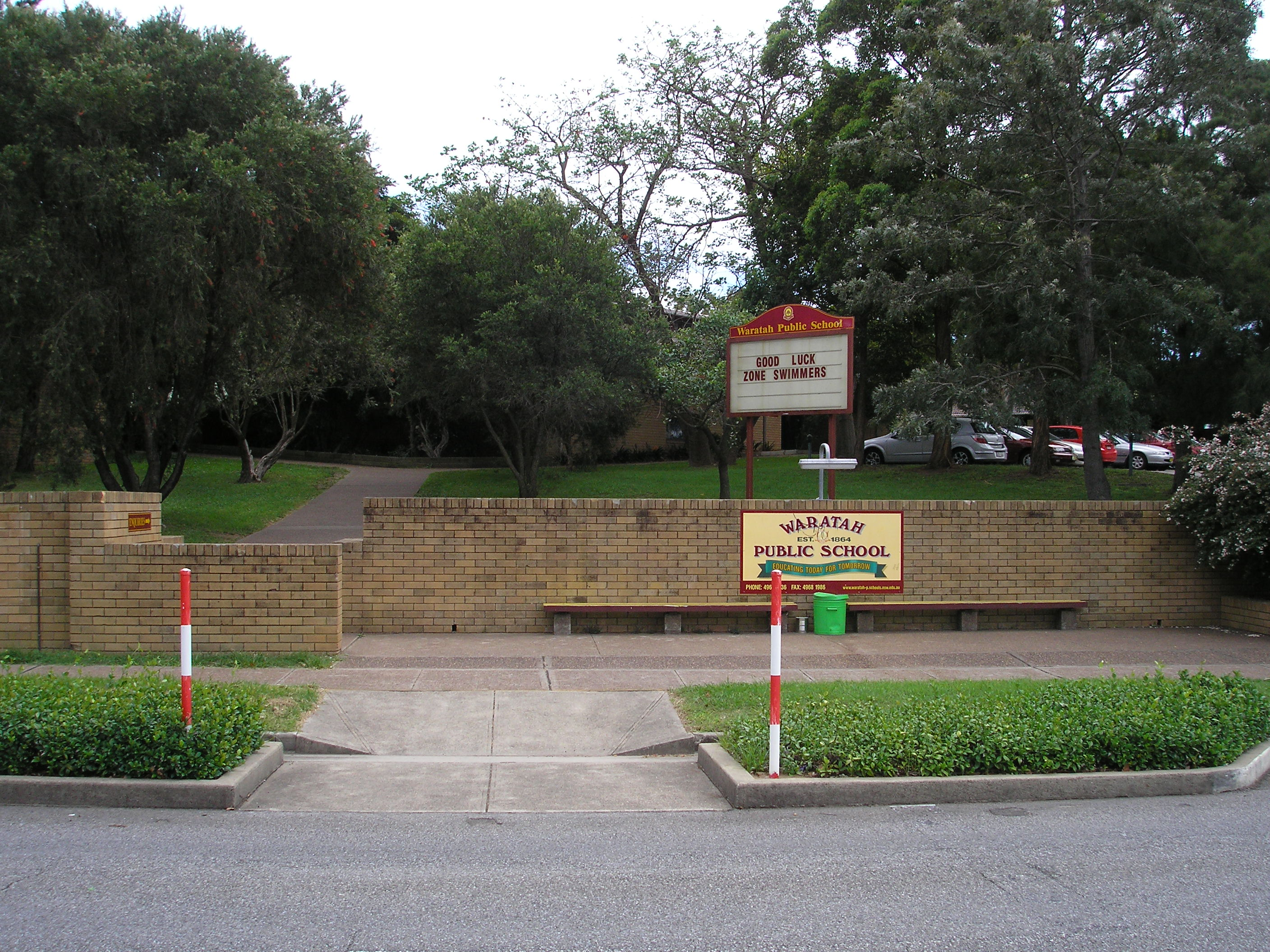
Waratah Public School, Lambton Road, 2007

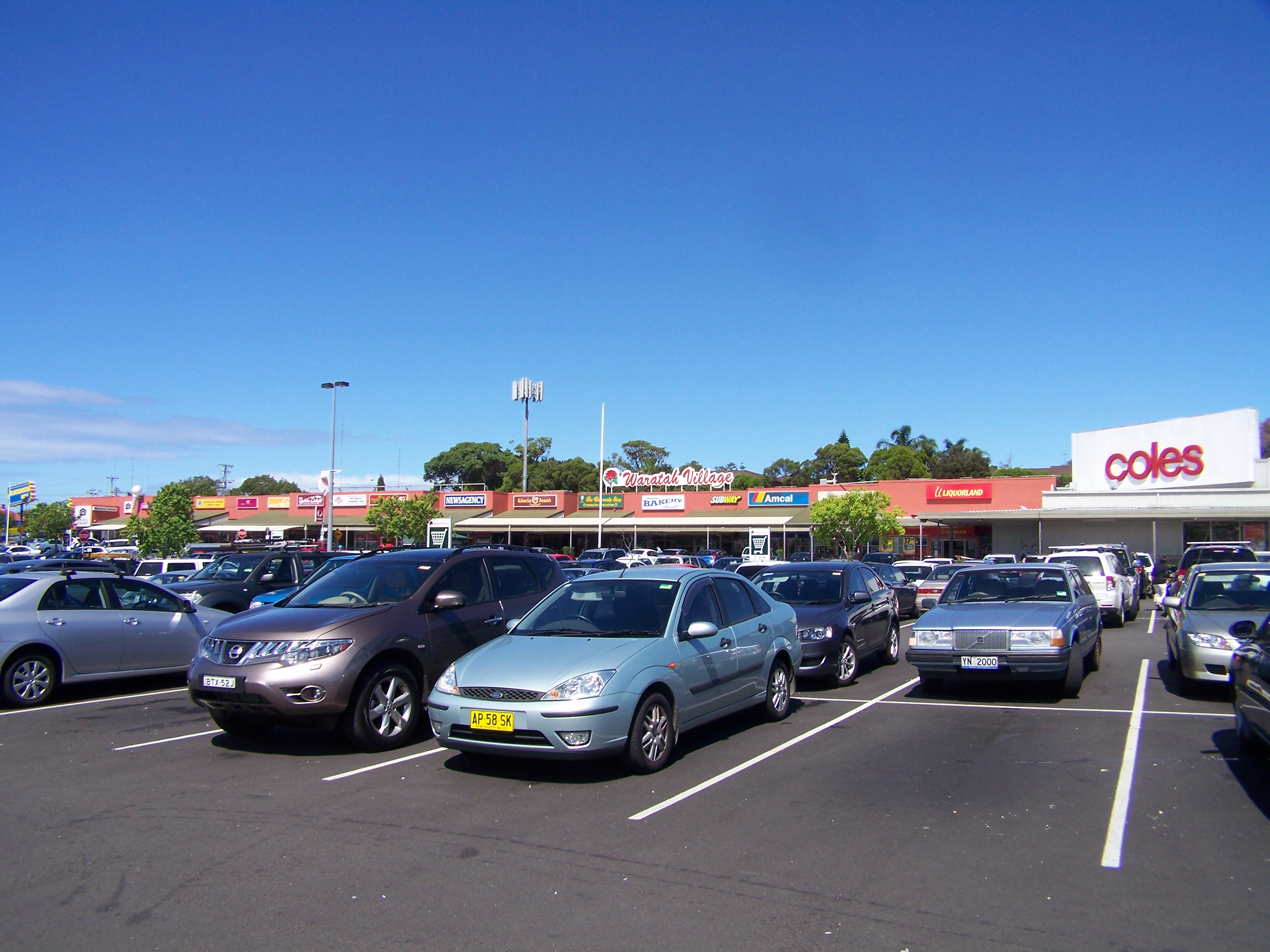
Waratah_Village, Turton Road, 2007

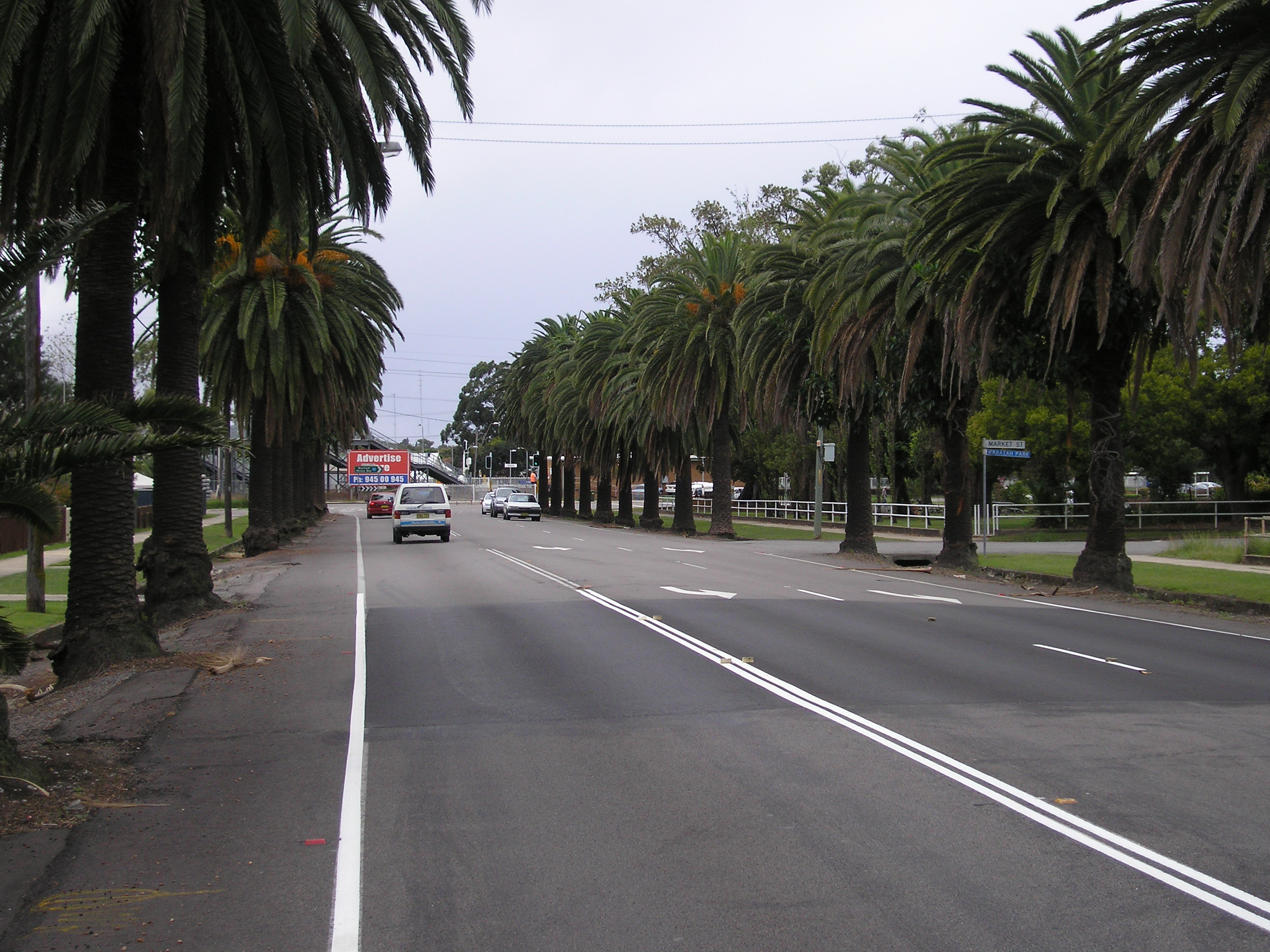
Grove of trees on Station Street, 2007

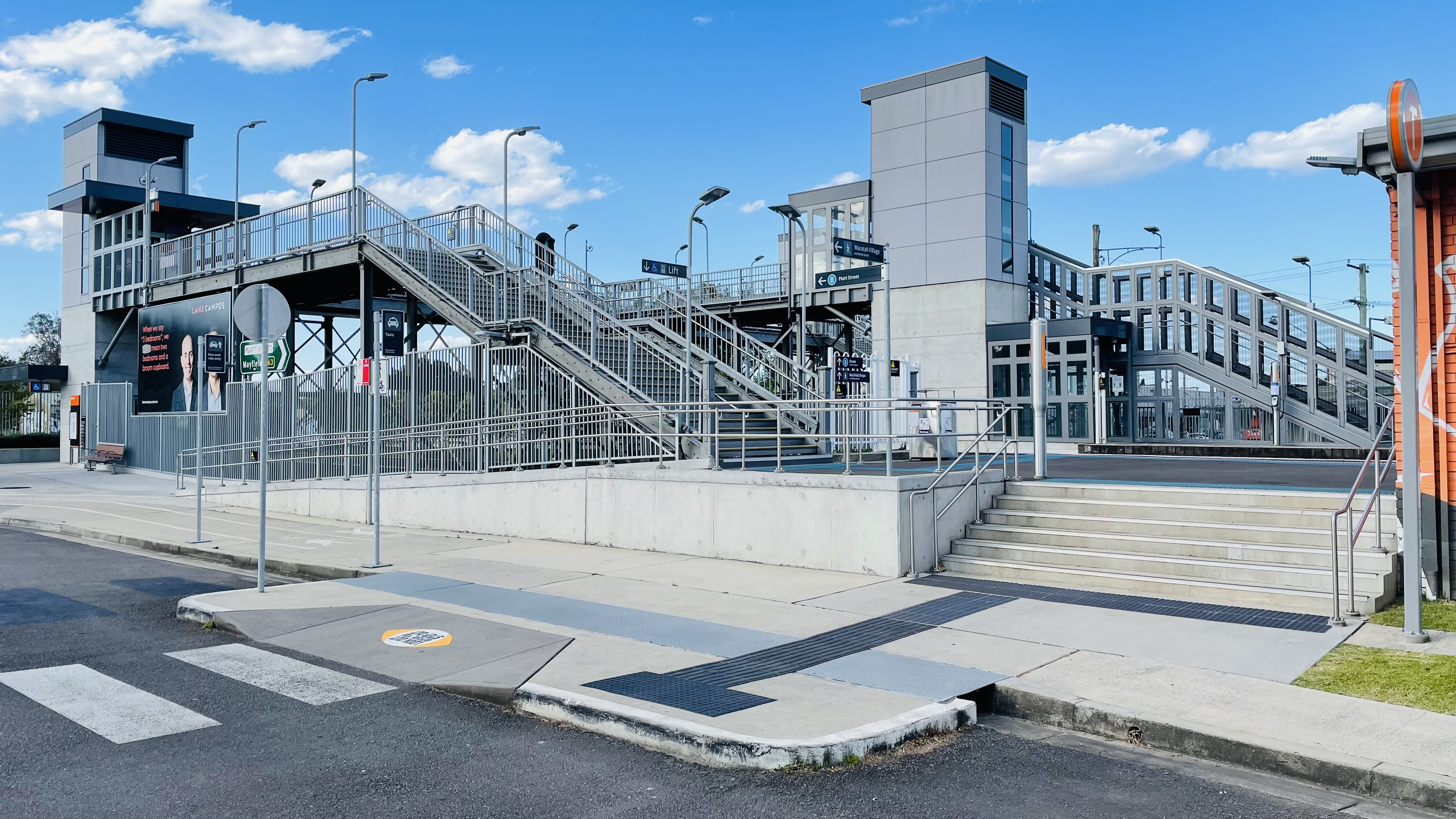
Waratah Railway Station, Station Street, 2022
