= List of Australian diesel locomotives =

Rail transport in Australia utilizes various diesel locomotives.

== NSWGR/SRA/FreightCorp and successors ==
=== Diesel-electric ===
- 40 class
- 41 class
- 42 class
- 421 class
- 422 class
- 43 class
- 44 class
- 442 class
- 45 class (and 35 class)
- 47 class
- 48 class
- 49 class
- 79 class
- 80 class
- 81 class
- 82 class
- 90 class
- 92 class
- PL class ex–48 class
- XPT

=== Diesel-hydraulic ===
- 70 class
- 71 class
- 72 class
- 73 class
- X100 & X200 class rail tractors

== Commonwealth Railways/Australia National/National Rail ==
- AN class
- DL class
- BL class
- NR class
- AL class
- BU class
- CK class
- CL class
- DA (900) class
- DE class
- DR class
- EL class
- GM class
- MDH class
- NB class
- NC class
- NJ (1600) class
- NSU class
- NT class

== South Australian Railways ==
=== Diesel-electric ===
- 350
- 500
- 600
- 700
- 800
- 830
- 900
- 930

== Victorian Railways/V/Line/Freight Australia ==
=== Diesel-electric ===
- A Class
- B Class
- C Class
- F Class
- G Class
- H Class
- N Class
- P Class
- S Class
- T Class
- V class
- X Class
- XR Class
- XRB Class
- Y Class

=== Diesel-hydraulic ===
- M class
- V class (retired)
- W class

== BHP/AIS and successors ==
=== Diesel-electric ===
- BHP Port Kembla D1 class
- BHP Port Kembla D9 class
- BHP Port Kembla D16 class
- BHP Port Kembla D34 class
- BHP Port Kembla D35 class
- BHP/Austrac Port Kembla 101 class
- BHP/Austrac Port Kembla 103
- BHP Newcastle 32 class
- BHP Newcastle 37 class
- BHP Whyalla DH class (DE1–2, 3–9, 10)
- Lysaghts JL1 class
- Lysaghts JL4 class
- GE AC6000CW (imported)
- Emd SD70ACe lc (imported)

=== Diesel-hydraulic ===
- BHP Whyalla DH class

== Silverton Tramway ==
=== Diesel-hydraulic ===
- Silverton ST26

=== Diesel-electric ===
- 48s

== Queensland Rail ==
Aurizon (formerly QRNational) also operates Standard Gauge classes from other railways: the V/Line G and X classes, the New South Wales (formerly State Rail Authority) 421, 422, and 423 classes, and Commonwealth Railways CLF/CLP classes.

=== Diesel-electric ===
- 1150
- 1170
- 1200 (and 1225 rebuild)
- 1250
- 1270
- 1300
- 1400
- 1450
- 1460
- 1502
- 1550
- 1600
- 1620
- 1700
- 1720
- 2100
- 2130 (until 2007)
- 2141
- 2150
- 2170
- 2250
- 2300
- 2350
- 2370
- 2400
- 2450
- 2470
- 2600
- 2800
- 4000
- 4100

=== Diesel-mechanical ===
- DL class

=== Diesel-hydraulic ===
- DH class

== Freightlink ==
- FQ class
- FJ class

== CFCLA ==
- GL class
- RL class
- VL class

== See also ==
- List of locomotives
- List of Western Australian locomotive classes
- List of Victorian locomotive classes
- NSWGR steam locomotive classification
- Queensland Railways steam locomotive classification
- Rail transport in Australia
