= Richmond Vale Railway Museum =

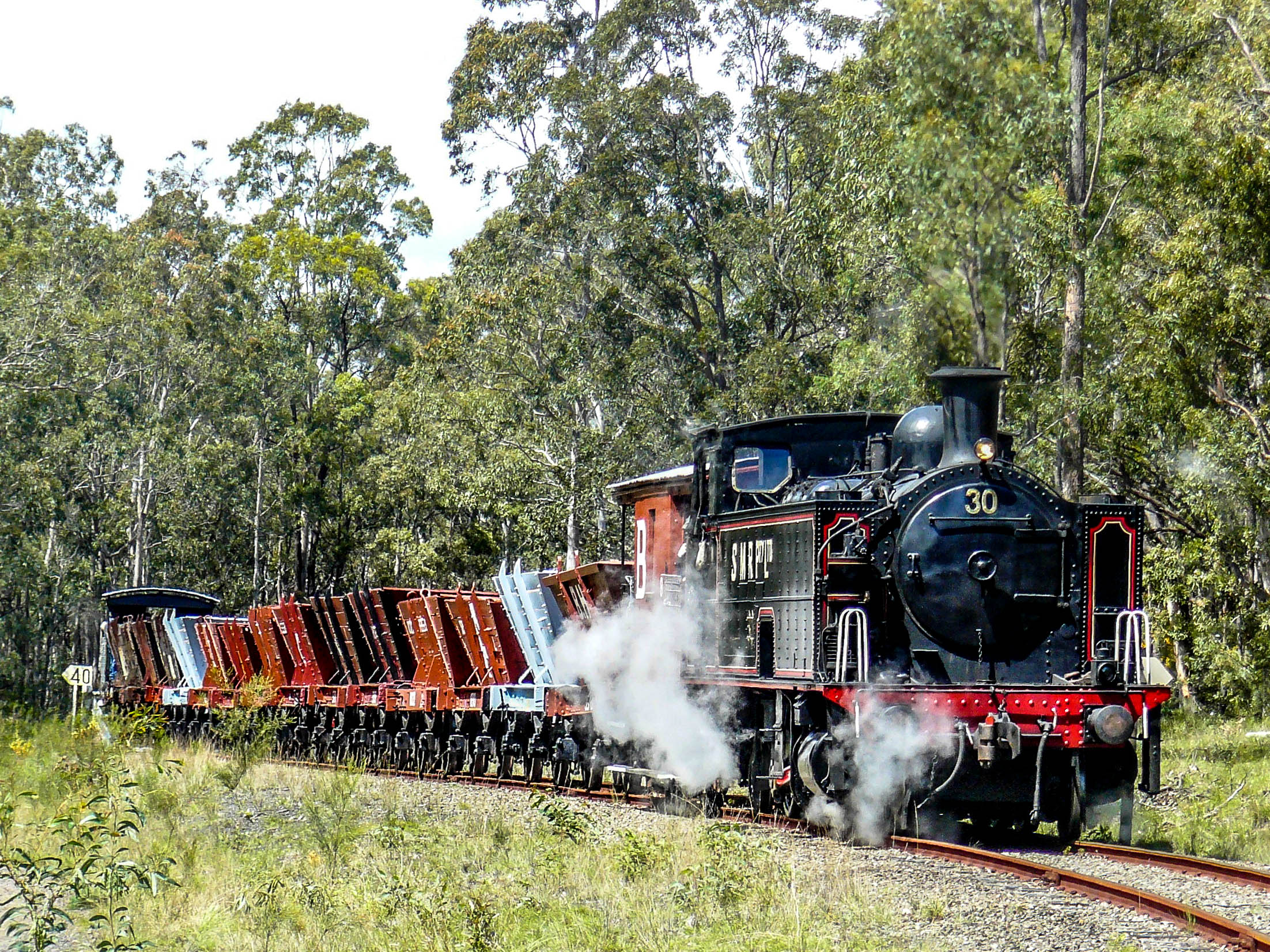
- Established: 1979
- Location: Leggett's Drive, Richmond Vale, New South Wales, Australia
- Coordinates: 32.857293°S 151.47582°E
- Type: Railway museum
- Parking: On site
- Website: Official Site

The Richmond Vale Railway Museum operates a railway and museum located at the heritage-listed Richmond Main Colliery south of Kurri Kurri, New South Wales. The museum is a volunteer non-profit organization, formed in 1979 with the aim of preserving the Richmond Vale railway line and the mining heritage of J & A Brown and the Hunter Valley.

== History ==
After the closure of Richmond Main Power Station in 1976, Cessnock City Council acquired the abandoned Richmond Main Colliery together with 40 acres (16.2 ha) surrounding the buildings from Coal & Allied.

In 1979 the newly formed Richmond Vale Preservation Co-operative Society assumed the responsibility for the railway, leaving the development of Richmond Main Park and Mining Museum to be done independently.

== Operations ==
The museum is opened on the first three Sundays of each month and every Sunday during school holidays, and the site consists of the following features:

- Richmond Vale Office
- Museum Display
- Mining Equipment
- Railway Locomotives and Rolling Stock
- former passenger line from Richmond Main Colliery to Pelaw Main Colliery Line.

== Preservation ==
Steam Locomotives
No.	Description	Manufacturer	Year	In service Railway	Location	Status	Ref
9 Pelaw Main	2-8-2T	Kitson & Company	1908	J & A Brown	Kurri Kurri	stored unrestored
10 Richmond Main	2-8-2T	Kitson & Company	1911	J & A Brown	Kurri Kurri	stored unrestored
SMR 19	2-8-2T	Beyer, Peacock & Company	1915	South Maitland Railway	Kurri Kurri	Stored unrestored
SMR 22	2-8-2T	Beyer, Peacock & Company	1920	South Maitland Railway	Kurri Kurri	Stored unrestored
SMR 24	2-8-2T	Beyer, Peacock & Company	1922	South Maitland Railway	Kurri Kurri	Overhaul
SMR 25	2-8-2T	Beyer, Peacock & Company	1922	South Maitland Railway	Kurri Kurri	stored
SMR 30	2-8-2T	Beyer, Peacock & Company	1924	South Maitland Railway	Kurri Kurri	Overhaul
BHP 2	60T Crane	Industrial Works	1913	BHP Newcastle Steelworks	Kurri Kurri	pending restoration
BHP 5	15T Crane	Industrial Brownhoist	1920	BHP Newcastle Steelworks	Kurri Kurri	undergoing restoration
ROD 23	2-8-0	Gorton Locomotive Works	1918	J & A Brown	Kurri Kurri	static display
Alison	0-4-0ST	Andrew Barclay Sons & Company	1922	John Lysaght	Kurri Kurri	static display
Marjorie	0-4-0ST	Clyde Engineering	1938	John Lysaght	Kurri Kurri	Operational
Kathleen	0-4-0ST	Avonside Engine Company	1921	John Lysaght	Kurri Kurri	undergoing restoration

The museum also operates a small number of ex-industrial diesels, and owns a wide variety of ex-New South Wales Government Railways and ex-industrial rollingstock.

Ex-industrial diesels are:

- BHP 34 - built 1954, A Goninan & Co (B/N 3/S1003) (Stored-Operational)
- BHP 42 (Static- privately owned)
- BHP 43 - built 1960, A Goninan & Co (B/N 3456-10/60-007) (Static)
- BHP 53 - built 1963, A Goninan & Co (B/N 9211-4/64-018) (Operational)
- BHP 54 - built 1965, A Goninan & Co(B/N 3835-12/65-020) (Static)
- DR1 ex Commonwealth Railways - built 1954, Ruston & Hornsby (B/N 3279868) (Static)
- Planet Number 54 ex Maritime Services Board Coffs Harbour Jetty - Built 1955, F.C. Hibberd (B/N 3715) (Operational)
- NSWGR Former steam operated now diesel powered 70T crane No. 1073, converted during use with NSWGR - built 1928, Cravens (Operational)
- X215 - built Department of Railways New South Wales Chullora Railway Workshops 1968 (static)
- X217 - built Department of Railways New South Wales Chullora Railway Workshops 1968 (operational)

Rail Motor

- A 1923 Cadillac motor car was converted in 1937–8 to run on rails and its body was altered to carry more passengers. It was then operated as a passenger carrying vehicle for J & A Brown & Abermain Seaham Collieries company officials throughout the Richmond Vale Railway system until 1949. It subsequently saw service with the Sydney Tramway Museum in the Royal National Park, from 1964 until 1972 and is now undergoing restoration at Richmond Vale Railway Museum.

== 2017 Fire ==
Following a fire on 13 September 2017, the museum was closed, with the following losses.:

- 3 stainless steel passenger cars
- 10 of 16 restored non-air coal hoppers and almost all non-restored wagons
- All of the unrestored general freight vehicles
- Approximately 2.5 kilometres of track
- Damage to number 1 bridge on the link line to Pelaw Main.

The museum reopened to limited rail operation on 4 March 2018 and is gradually restoring damaged track to trafficable condition, with shuttle train services available over restored track. Other elements of the museum's operations remain available on open days as before the fire.
