= Class 72 =

Class 72 or 72 class may refer to:

- New South Wales 72 class locomotive, diesel-hydraulic locomotives
- NSB Class 72, a Norwegian passenger train
- German passenger tank locomotives with a 4-4-0T wheel arrangement operated by the Deutsche Reichsbahn comprising the:
  - Class 72.0: Prussian T 5.2
  - Class 72.1: Bavarian Pt 2/4 N
