= John Scholey =

Australian businessman (1840–1908)

- Scholey, 1905
- Born: 15 September 1840; Holbeck Village, Leeds, England
- Died: 14 April 1908 (aged 67); Mayfield House, Mayfield, New South Wales
- Resting place: Sandgate Cemetery
- Occupation: Mayor
- Known for: Landed proprietor, businessman, colliery owner, mayor
- Board member of: Newcastle Land Board
- Spouse: Anne Greaves (1845–1931) (m. 1865)
- Children: 7 daughters
- Parent(s): Stephen Scholey and Anne née Spink

John Scholey (15 September 1840 in Holbeck, Leeds, – 14 April 1908 in Mayfield, New South Wales) was an extensive landed proprietor, prominent businessman, colliery owner, Director of Aberdare Collieries, and a Mayor. He was a Justice of the Peace and member of the Newcastle Land Board, a division of the New South Wales Justice Department.

== Background ==
The Scholey family are to be found with various spellings in ancient manuscripts but often as de Scolay or Scoley. They were long resident at Gawber Hall, outside Barnsley, near the village of Barugh, in South Yorkshire. By 1848 the mansion and its farms had been let and the family removed to the vicinity of Leeds.

John was the son of a Leeds businessman, Stephen Scholey (1815–1878) who entered the service of the Colonial Office in New South Wales, and was a Member of the New South Wales Legislative Assembly for East Maitland. John's mother was Anne Spink John appears in the 1851 Census Return at 27 Trafalgar Street, Leeds, aged 11, with his parents and his sister Mary Ann.

== New South Wales ==
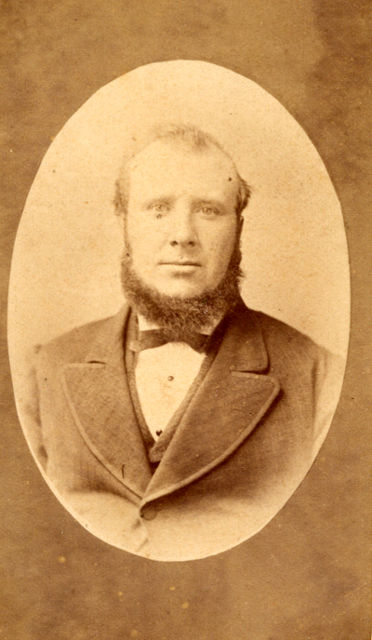
John Scholey, 31 August 1878.

In October 1852 John Scholey arrived at Melbourne, Australia on board "Julia", together with his father. His mother and young sister joined them in Melbourne in December 1854 on board "Constance". They returned to England on the ship Speedy which left Sydney on 1 November 1857, arriving in London on 1 March 1858. He arrived back in Leeds the following day. On 18 January 1860 he again set out for Australia, travelling from Leeds, via Halifax for Liverpool, the following day taking up his cabin on board the ship Red Jacket berthed at the Queen's Dock, declaring the accommodation "splendid and superior to any ship I have been in before." He landed at Melbourne on 26 April. He made valuable contacts in Melbourne, but in 1862 commenced business in Newcastle. and at the time of his marriage to Anne, née Greaves (1845–1931), on 16 January 1865, at Christ Church Anglican Cathedral, Newcastle, the register states that he was now resident in that parish. His father was a witness at the ceremony. John was listed at that time: "Scholey, John, Hunter Street, Newcastle". On his daughter Jessie's birth certificate in February 1883, John Scholey stated that he now resided at Hamilton, a garden suburb of Newcastle.

== Business interests ==
According to Australian Town & Country Journal of 11 July 1887, "he carried on business so successfully that he was able to acquire a considerable share of landed property in the Newcastle and Maitland Districts." On his daughter Agnes's birth certificate (1888) he is described as "Landowner". He eventually bought up much of the Newcastle district known as North Waratah, subdividing it as the city environs grew, and renaming it Mayfield after Ada May, one of his daughters. Other streets in the suburb still bear his surname, his wife's maiden name of Greaves, and some of his daughter's Christian names: Clara, Ada, Dora, etc.

He sold at a handsome profit the land at Mayfield, some of it bordering the Hunter River, upon which just before World War I was built the new BHP Newcastle Steelworks (now demolished), and other huge heavy industries. Owning much coal-bearing land on the Kurri Kurri and Cessnock districts of the South Maitland coalfields, he also became involved in the coal-mining industry. In 1887 he employed Mr. T. W. Edgeworth David to assess his lands for coal seams, and the following year he formed a syndicate including a Melbourne partner and established the Richmond Vale Coal Company. Scholey's investment in the new company was his land. In October that year they sunk a bore finding huge seams on this land outside Kurri Kurri, and in January 1890 they sank a new shaft, "the Scholey shaft". However the following year only 2500 tons was produced, the industry suffering a severe depression. In 1897 the company sold a lease of the operations to J & A Brown and Abermain Seaham Collieries, for £39,500 and Brown's changed the name from Richmond Vale to Richmond Main Colliery, although oddly continued to name their rail link the Richmond Vale railway line. As time progressed this colliery produced the largest daily tonnage in the State, as well as providing, from 1912, all the electricity requirements for nearby Kurri Kurri and other townships.

In 1904 he was also a Director of Aberdare Collieries Co. Ltd.

Scholey was one of the earliest directors of the Newcastle and County Building Company, and one of the prime movers in the establishment of the Waratah Municipal Gasworks which went on to become the principal gas suppliers to the City of Newcastle.

== Civic positions ==
John Scholey, as Alderman (elected 1882) and thrice Mayor of the Municipality of Waratah, New South Wales, received an official invitation to the New South Wales Government's State Banquet held in Sydney on Thursday, 26 January 1888, to commemorate the first 100 years of settlement in the colony. The Earl of Carnarvon and Lord Carrington were present along with a host of other well-known dignitaries.

A practising Christian, he was lay representative for Waratah to the 122nd Church of England Synod held at Newcastle in May 1900; he was Diocesan Warden for Newcastle's Christ Church Cathedral, a member of the Newcastle Diocesan Council, and also a member of the Diocesan Church Property Committee. He was the sole surviving Executor of the Will of his father-in-law, William Greaves, another Newcastle businessman, when he signed the declaration that all affairs to do with that estate were now complete, 18 May 1907.

When the Foundation stone of the Waratah School of Arts was laid by Henry Parkes, John Scholey became a guarantor for the building. He was also Patron of the Northern District Bowling Association from its formation, President of Waratah Bowling Club, and churchwarden (Lay Representative) of St. Andrew's Church of England, Mayfield.

== Family and death ==
Until his death he maintained a continual correspondence with his family in Yorkshire, notably his first cousin, Stephen Scholey, a professor of music also born in Holbeck, who resided in Hunslet, and who outlived John.

In a full report of John Scholey's funeral the names of many of the most prominent attendees are given and it is stated that over 200 telegrams of condolence were received. He was buried in the Church of England division of Sandgate Cemetery. In his Will (proved 8 October 1908) he bequeathed his entire estate to his wife, by whom he had seven daughters, six of whom survived him. His daughter Clara married Robert, son of Charles Upfold, the managing director of the Sydney Soap and Candle Company, "the largest such concern in Australasia". His youngest daughter, Agnes, died a spinster in 1972.

John Scholey was described in directories and upon his death certificate, as a "gentleman".

== Mayfield House ==
Two servants in front of Mayfield House, 1900.

His sandstone mansion Mayfield House, "an impressive residence", is now currently leased as a hostel for Youth with a Mission and is owned by the Baptist Church.

== Gallery ==
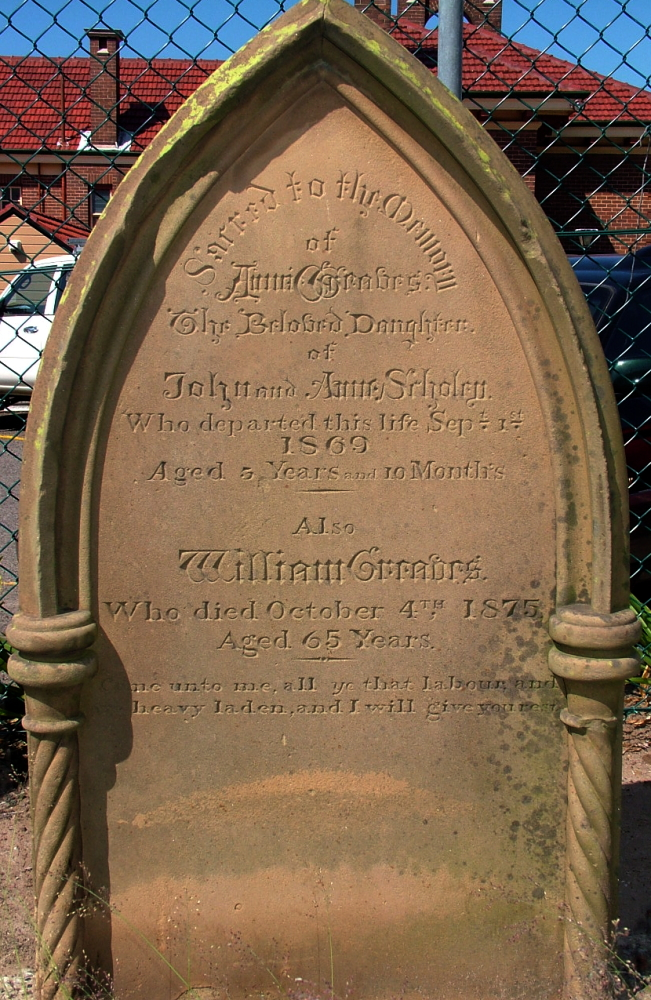
Gravestone of Anne Greaves, daughter of John and Anne Scholey. Grave is located at Christchurch Cathedral, Newcastle New South Wales.

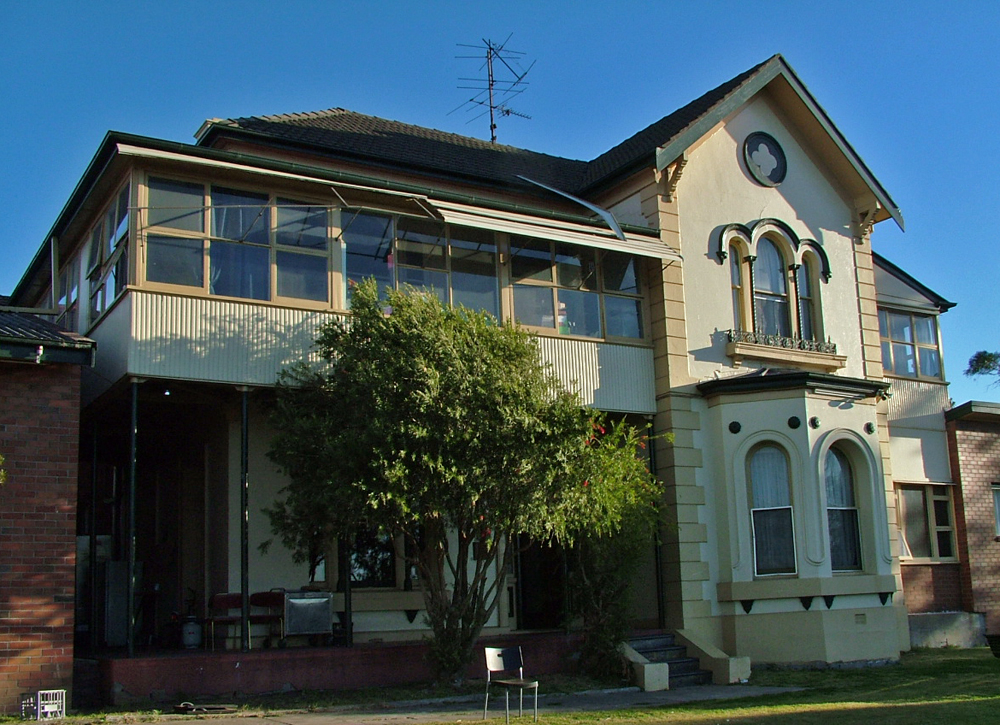
Mayfield house, as it looks now.

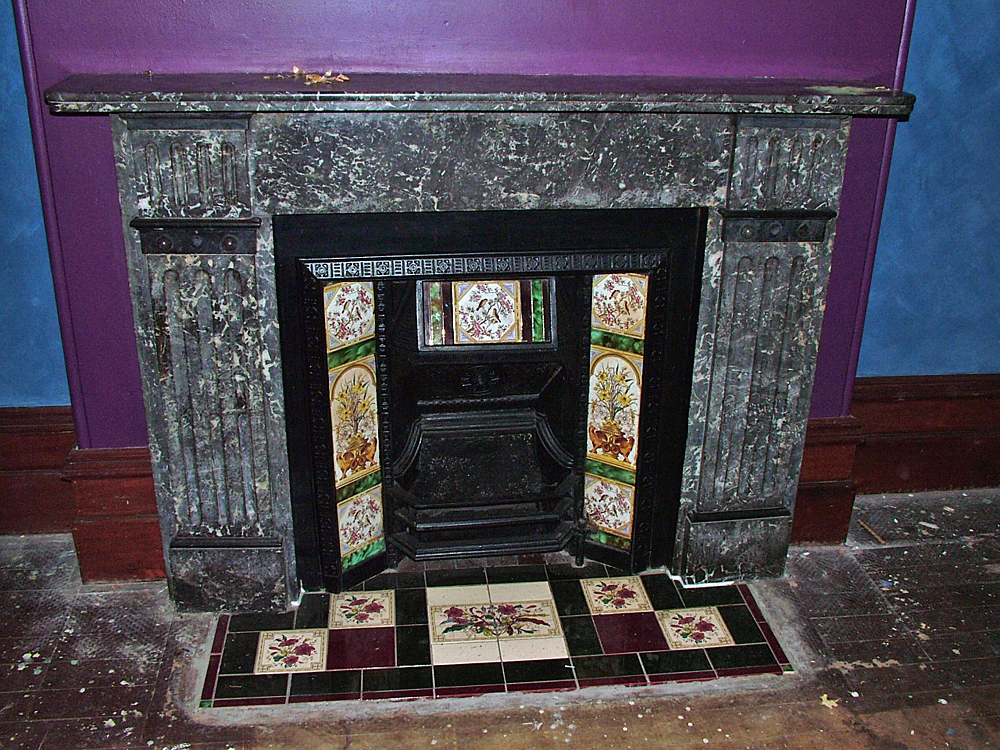
One of the original fireplaces in Mayfield House.
