= DH class =

DH class could refer to several types of locomotives:

- BHP Whyalla DH class
- NIR 1 Class
- New Zealand DH class locomotive
- New Zealand DG and DH class locomotive
- Queensland Railways DH class
