= Upfold =

Upfold is a surname. Notable people with the surname include:

- Charles Upfold (1834–1919), English soap manufacturer
- George Upfold (1796–1872), Episcopal Bishop of Indiana
