= New South Wales X100 class locomotive =

Australian diesel-mechanical locomotives

New South Wales X100 class
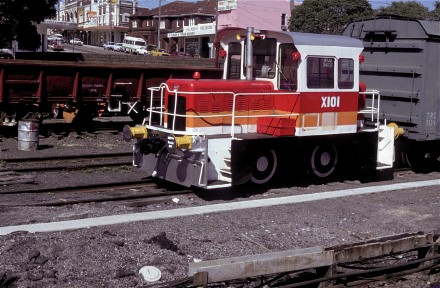
- X101 at Petersham Training School
Type and origin
- Power type: Diesel-mechanical
- Builder: Chullora Railway Workshops
- Build date: 1962
- Total produced: 2
Specifications
- Configuration
  - UIC: B
- Gauge: 4 ft 8 1/2 in (1,435 mm) standard gauge
- Wheel diameter: 34 in (864 mm)
- Wheelbase: 6 ft 6 in (1.98 m)
- Length: Over headstocks: 19 ft 0 in (5.79 m), Over coupler pulling faces: 22 ft 4 1/2 in (6.82 m)
- Width: 9 ft 0 3/16 in (2.75 m)
- Height: 11 ft 0 5/16 in (3.36 m)
- Axle load: 8 long tons 16 cwt (19,700 lb or 8.9 t)
- Loco weight: 17 long tons 14 cwt (39,600 lb or 18 t)
- Fuel type: Diesel fuel
- Fuel capacity: 86 imperial gallons (390 litres; 103 US gallons)
- Lubricant cap.: Engine: 1.5 imperial gallons (6.8 litres; 1.8 US gallons), Transmission: 4.5 imperial gallons (20 litres; 5.4 US gallons), Final drive
- Coolant cap.: 7.5 imperial gallons (34 litres; 9.0 US gallons)
- Prime mover: Bedford 300 series BIB
- RPM range: 600–2500
- Engine type: Four-stroke diesel
- Aspiration: Normally aspirated
- Cylinders: 6
- Cylinder size: 3.875 in × 4.25 in (98 mm × 108 mm)
- Transmission: Allison CRT 3331-3, with BorgWarner M12 final drive unit, and chain drive to both axles
- Train brakes: None
Performance figures
- Maximum speed: 15 mph (24 km/h)
- Power output: Gross: 93 hp (69 kW), For traction: 51 hp (38 kW)
- Tractive effort: Continuous: 3,800 lbf (16.90 kN) at 5 mph (8 km/h)
Career
- Operators: New South Wales Government Railways
- Class: X100
- Number in class: 2
- Numbers: X101–X102
- First run: 1962
- Withdrawn: 1992
- Preserved: X101, X102
- Disposition: both preserved

The X100 class is a pair of rail tractors built by Chullora Railway Workshops in 1962 and operated by the New South Wales Government Railways of Australia.

== History ==
A need existed for a small shunting unit that could handle the requirements at the smaller junction marshalling yards, larger intermediate stops and the workshop needs. To resolve this, the X100, and later X200s, was designed and built entirely in the system's own workshops from the early 1960s.

X100 class were two 0-4-0 centre-cab diesel-hydraulic shunting locomotives built at the New South Wales Government Railways' Chullora Railway Workshops.

They were delivered in 1962 as the 80 class locomotives, but were re-classified as Shunting Tractors and renumbered X101 and X102 before being allotted to Wauchope and Coffs Harbour. Originally painted in a crimson red and cream colour scheme, they were later repainted in the standard Indian red with chrome lining.

Photos dated 1977 and 1983, show X102 in an all-over chrome yellow paint scheme and working in the Sydney area. X101 was in an all-over Indian-red scheme in 1979 and working at Wauchope.

X101 is now part of the State Rail Authority Heritage Fleet and is being restored by Historic Electric Traction at Eveleigh Carriage Workshops. X102 finished its service at the Petersham Training School and is now preserved at the Dorrigo Steam Railway & Museum.

They were confined to yard limits due to a lack of a "train brake" and as such could not be operated in the same way as regular locomotives. This limitation, and a need for greater tractive effort, lead to the development of the larger and more power X200 class.
