= New South Wales 72 class locomotive =

Australian diesel-hydraulic locomotive

New South Wales 72 class
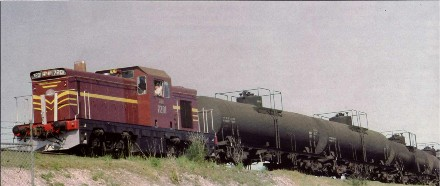
- 7201 at Port Botany in 1965
Type and origin
- Power type: Diesel-hydraulic
- Builder: Chullora Railway Workshops
- Serial number: 9
- Build date: 1965
- Total produced: 1
Specifications
- Configuration
  - UIC: Bo-Bo
- Gauge: 4 ft 8 1/2 in (1,435 mm) standard gauge
- Wheel diameter: 37 in (940 mm)
- Length: Over coupler pulling faces: 45 ft 2 1/4 in (13.77 m)
- Width: 9 ft 2 in (2,794 mm)
- Height: 12 ft 7 1/4 in (3,842 mm)
- Loco weight: 55 long tons 0 cwt (123,200 lb or 55.9 t)
- Fuel type: Diesel
- Fuel capacity: 500 imp gal (2,300 L; 600 US gal)
- Lubricant cap.: Engine: 20 imp gal (91 L; 24 US gal), Transmission: 40 imp gal (180 L; 48 US gal), Final Drives: 6 imp gal (27 L; 7.2 US gal) each
- Coolant cap.: 180 imp gal (820 L; 220 US gal)
- Sandbox cap.: 12 cu ft (0.34 m^{3})
- Prime mover: Cummins VT12-825-BI
- RPM range: 600–2000
- Engine type: Four-stroke diesel
- Aspiration: Turbocharged
- Cylinders: V12
- Cylinder size: 5.5 in × 6 in (140 mm × 152 mm)
- Transmission: Clark Model 16420 Reversing
Performance figures
- Maximum speed: 45 mph (72 km/h)
- Power output: Gross: 705 hp (530 kW), For traction: 640 hp (477 kW)
- Tractive effort: Continuous: 32,500 lbf (144.57 kN) at 5 mph (8 km/h)
Career
- Operators: NSW Department of Railways
- Number in class: 1
- Numbers: 7201
- First run: 27 August 1965
- Last run: 2 March 1976
- Withdrawn: August 1976
- Scrapped: December 1976
- Disposition: Scrapped

The 72 class was a class of diesel locomotive built by Chullora Railway Workshops for the New South Wales, Australia, Department of Railways in 1965.

== Construction ==
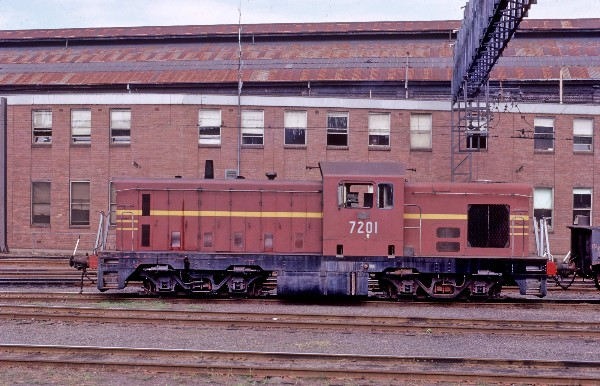
7201 at Eveleigh Railway Workshops in May 1973

Locomotive 7201 was a diesel-hydraulic locomotive, with B-B wheel arrangement. Built in the Department of Railways Water Supply Workshops at Chullora, it performed its first light engine trial on 27 August 1965. It was built on the lengthened underframe of an unused 58 class locomotive tender, but using the bogies from a Standard Goods locomotive turret tender. The cab was similar to that of an X200 class and the livery was similar to a 48 class.

The prime-mover was a Cummins VT 12-825-BI; V12 engine, developing 640 horsepower at 2,000 rpm. Power was distributed to the bogies through a Clark C 16911 torque converter with Clark 16421 transmission.

== Operations ==
Following some modifications, it entered service on 8 September 1965 as a shunter at Cooks River Goods Yard. Over the next 6 months, it spent time shunting in yards at Goulburn, Junee, Broadmeadow and Werris Creek, and Port waratah. It even had a brief sojourn on the Yass Tramway. During this time, it re-entered the workshops for modifications and repairs. After this initial period, it spent extended periods at the Rozelle yards, however by 1970 it was regularly struggling with the loads. It was then trialed at the ACDEP carriage sheds where it shunted the carriages from air-conditioned trains. It was deemed a success in this duty and remained there until 2 March 1976 when it suffered a seized engine.

== Demise ==
Being a one-off and therefore non-standard, the decision was made not to repair the locomotive. On 4 August 1976, it was condemned and scrapped in December that year.
