= Bavarian Pt 2/3 =

Bavarian Pt 2/3 DRG Class 70.0 ÖBB 770
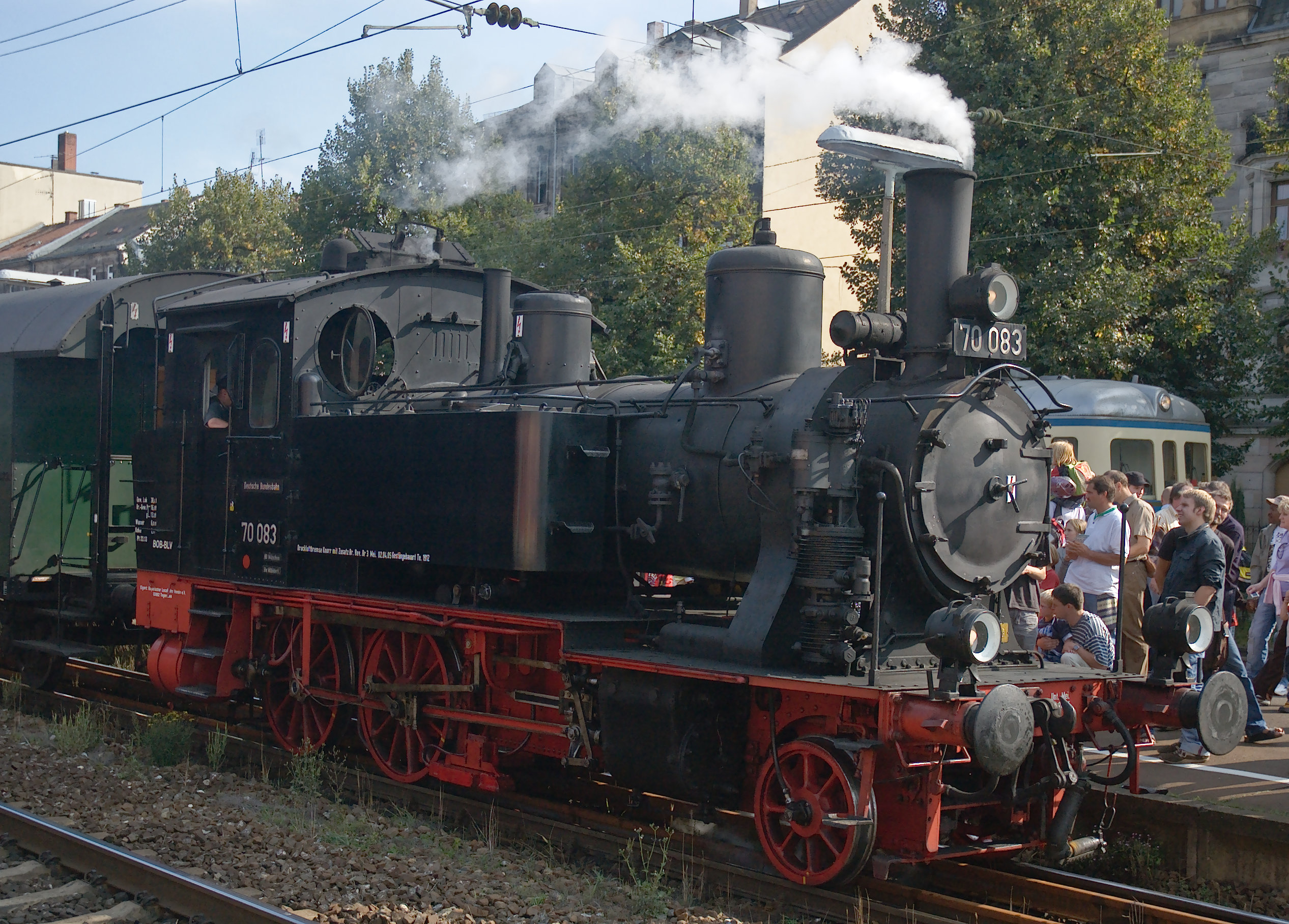
- 70 083 in Fürth Hauptbahnhof, September 2007
Type and origin
- Builder: Krauss
- Build date: 1909–1916
- Total produced: 1909 locos: 2; 1910–13 locos: 89; 1915–16 locos: 6; Total: 97
Specifications
- Configuration
  - Whyte: 2-4-0T
- Gauge: 1,435 mm (4 ft 8 1/2 in)
- Leading dia.: 1909–11 locos: 850 mm (2 ft 9 1/2 in); 1915–16 locos: 1,006 mm (3 ft 3 5/8 in)
- Driver dia.: 1,250 mm (4 ft 1 1/4 in)
- Length
  - Over beams: 1909 locos: 9,065 mm (29 ft 9 in); 1910–13 locos: 9,165 mm (30 ft 3/4 in); 1915–16 locos: 9,265 mm (30 ft 4 3/4 in)
- Axle load: 1909 locos: 13.6 t (13.4 long tons; 15.0 short tons); 1910–13 locos: 14.1 t (13.9 long tons; 15.5 short tons); 1915–16 locos: 14.2 t (14.0 long tons; 15.7 short tons)
- Adhesive weight: 1909 locos: 27.2 t (26.8 long tons; 30.0 short tons); 1910–13 locos: 28.3 t (27.9 long tons; 31.2 short tons); 1915–16 locos: 28.4 t (28.0 long tons; 31.3 short tons)
- Service weight: 1909 locos: 38.4 t (37.8 long tons; 42.3 short tons); 1910–13 locos: 39.5 t (38.9 long tons; 43.5 short tons); 1915–16 locos: 39.9 t (39.3 long tons; 44.0 short tons)
- Boiler pressure: 12 kgf/cm^{2} (1,180 kPa; 171 lbf/in^{2})
- Heating surface
  - Firebox: 1.22 m^{2} (13.1 sq ft)
  - Evaporative: 58.10 m^{2} (625.4 sq ft)
- Superheater
  - Heating area: 18.40 m^{2} (198.1 sq ft)
- Cylinders: Two
- Cylinder size: 375 mm (14 3/4 in)
- Piston stroke: 500 mm (19 11/16 in)
Performance figures
- Maximum speed: 65 km/h (40 mph)
- Indicated power: 420 PS (309 kW; 414 hp)
Career
- Numbers: 1909 locos: K.Bay.Sts.E: 6001–6002 → DRG 70 001–002; 1910–13 locos: K.Bay.Sts.E: 6003–6091 → DRG 70 003–091; 1915–16 locos: K.Bay.Sts.E: 6092–6097 → DRG 70 092–097; ÖBB: 770.86/92/95/96
- Retired: DB: by 1963; ÖBB: 1968

The two-cylinder, superheated Bavarian Pt 2/3 engine was built by Krauss for the Royal Bavarian State Railways (Königlich Bayerische Staats-Eisenbahnen) between 1909 and 1915. With its characteristic design - a carrying axle placed well to the front and two coupled axles at the rear under the outer firebox they asserted themselves over the rival Bavarian Pt 2/4 N and H classes and, after the demand fell for the services for which they were originally designed, they continued to be operated well into the 1960s on south German branch lines.

A total of 97 examples were built in three variants that only differed slightly from one another. Up to 1937, 50 engines were equipped with a Bissel axle; (the axle arrangement changed as a result from 1B to 1'B). The constructional feature of this locomotive was the unusually large distance between driving and carrying axle of 4,000 mm or, on the final six units, of 4,050 mm. This resulted in a lighter, but economically more sensible, lightweight design, that proved to be outstanding.

Behind the idea of the Pt 2/3 stood the concept of "light trains", whereby the guard was saved at the expense of the fireman, who accessed the train through a door in the back wall of the locomotive, whereupon he had to take over all the duties of the guard. The Pt 2/3, later DRG Class 70, was ousted from its original duties by electrification and by stronger locomotives like the Class 64 and moved into branch line services, where it remained for many years as a result of its economy. The doors on the rear wall, which had become superfluous, were in some cases removed in order to provide a larger coal bunker.

The Deutsche Bundesbahn took over 89 locomotives; four remained in Austria, three apparently as a result of military action were no longer worth repairing and one had been mustered out in 1935. The last engine, no. 70 083, was retired by the Nuremberg federal railway division in 1963 and transferred to Munich. After spending almost forty years as a memorial in Mühldorf am Inn, the Bavarian Branch Line Union (Bayerische Lokalbahnverein) was able to place the loco in service again in 2005.

After the Second World War, numbers 70 086, 092, 095 und 096 remained in Austria, and were preserved as ÖBB Class 770. Their main area of operation was the Pöchlarn–Kienberg-Gaming line. No. 770.086 was paid off on 31 January 1967 as the last of its type. This locomotive, which was then displayed at Pöchlarn station was reactivated in 1997 and, since 1999, has headed specials for the Brenner & Brenner Steam Locomotive Company (Brenner & Brenner Dampflokomotiven Betriebsgesellschaft).

== Literature ==
- Hütter, Ingo (2021). Die Dampflokomotiven der Baureihen 60 bis 91 der DRG, DRB, DB, und DR (in German). Werl: DGEG Medien. pp. 52–57. ISBN 978-3-946594-21-5.
- Knipping, Andreas (1998). Die Baureihe 70 - Die bayerische Tenderlok für leichte Züge und ihre badische Schwester. Freiburg: EK-Verlag. ISBN 3-88255-170-4.
- Weisbrod, Manfred; Müller, Hans; Petznik, Wolfgang (1978). Dampflokomotiven deutscher Eisenbahnen, Baureihe 60–96 (EFA 1.3) (in German) (4th ed.). Düsseldorf: Alba. pp. 35–37. ISBN 3-87094-083-2.

== See also ==
- Royal Bavarian State Railways
- List of Bavarian locomotives and railbuses
