= BHP Newcastle 37 class =

Class of Australian diesel locomotives

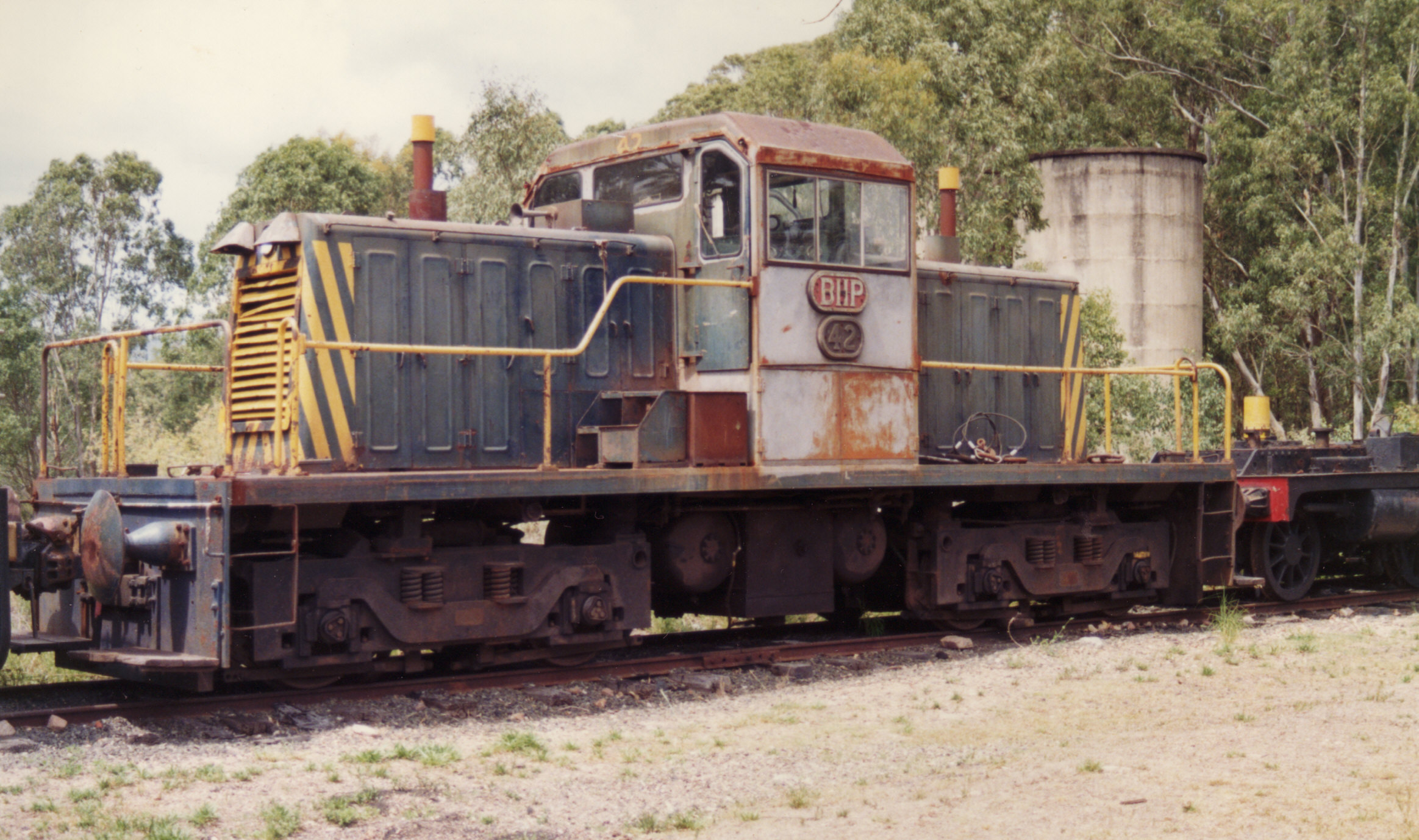
- 42 at the Richmond Vale Railway Museum in 1990
Type and origin
- Power type: Diesel-electric
- Builder: A Goninan & Co, Broadmeadow
- Model: General Electric 80 Ton switcher
- Build date: 1960–83
- Total produced: 22
Specifications
- Configuration
  - UIC: Bo-Bo
- Gauge: 914 mm (3 ft), 1,435 mm (4 ft 8 1/2 in) standard gauge
- Wheel diameter: 33 in (840 mm)
- Minimum curve: 75 ft 0 in (22.86 m)
- Length: 33 ft 9.5 in (10.300 m)
- Width: Narrow body 7 ft 3 in (2,210 mm); Widened body 9 ft 9 in (2,972 mm)
- Height: 13 ft 8 in (4.17 m)
- Fuel type: Diesel
- Fuel capacity: 330 imp gal (1,500 L; 400 US gal)
- Lubricant cap.: Cummins; 7 imp gal (32 L; 8.4 US gal); Rolls-Royce; 6.5 imp gal (30 L; 7.8 US gal)
- Coolant cap.: Cummins; 9 imp gal (41 L; 11 US gal)
- Sandbox cap.: 18 cu ft (0.51 m^{3})
- Prime mover: 2x Cummins NHS-B1-6, 2x Rolls-Royce C6TFL-6, 2x Cummins NT855-L4
- RPM range: Cummins NH6 600-2100 rpm Rolls-Royce 3 50-1010 rpm
- Engine type: 4-stroke in line 6 diesel
- Aspiration: Cummins NHS-B1 Supercharged; Rolls-Royce & Cummins NT855 Turbocharged
- Generator: 2 off General Electric GT-558
- Traction motors: 4 off General Electric GE-763
- Cylinders: 6
- Cylinder size: 5 1/2 in × 6 in (140 mm × 152 mm) bore x stroke
- Loco brake: Westinghouse A7 air
- Train brakes: Westinghouse AH7 air
Performance figures
- Maximum speed: 30 mph (48 km/h)
- Power output: 415 hp (309 kW) each Cummins supercharged, 423 hp (315 kW) each Rolls-Royce
- Tractive effort: 48,000 pounds-force (210 kN) starting
Career
- Operators: BHP Newcastle Steelworks
- Number in class: 22
- Numbers: 37–58
- Preserved: 42, 43, 47, 52, 53, 54
- Current owner: Junee Railway Workshop; Loongama Lime; Manildra Group
- Disposition: 7 in service, 6 preserved, 9 scrapped

The BHP Newcastle 37 class were a class of diesel locomotives built by A Goninan & Co, Broadmeadow for the BHP's, Newcastle Steelworks between 1960 and 1983.

== History ==
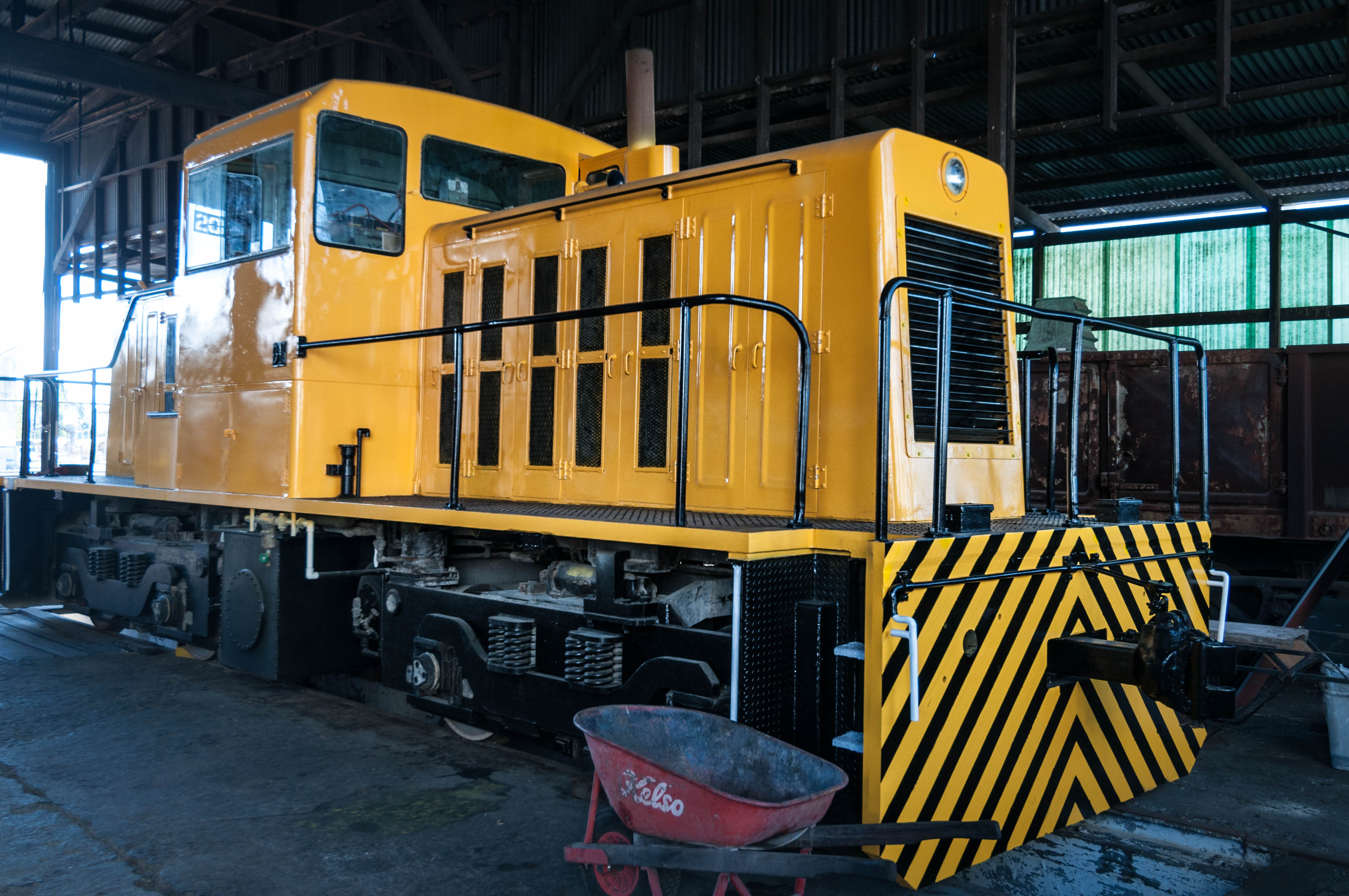
Preserved former Southern Portland Cement D1 at Goulburn Rail Heritage Centre in December 2013

In 1960, the first five locomotives numbered 37 to 41 were delivered by A Goninan & Co to a design suitable for use on both the narrow gauge 3 ft (914 mm) ingot system and the 4 ft 8 1/2 in (1,435 mm) standard gauge system. These locos were an Australian version of the standard General Electric 80 Ton switcher. Originally two of these five locomotives were fitted with narrow gauge bogies, the other three being fitted with standard gauge bogies. These locos were fitted with 2 Cummins NHS-B1-6 supercharged diesel engines. While the first five were under construction an order for a further six locos to the same specifications was placed, these locos were given numbers 42 to 47.

In 1961, a further 6 locos were ordered from Goninans, these 6 however were powered by two Rolls-Royce C6TFL turbocharged diesel engines. These 6 locos were numbered 48 to 53.

The first 15 locos were swapped between the narrow and standard gauge networks by changing the bogies and couplers. However, by the mid-1960s, problems were experienced in working wide standard gauge rolling stock such as the Treadwell hot metal cars. To overcome this, it was decided to dedicate 37 to 41 to the narrow gauge network, with 42 to 53 were progressively fitted with 9 ft 9 in (2.97 m) wide cabs and platforms to overcome the visibility problems.

In 1966, a further loco was delivered from Goninans. Numbered 54, it was built with a wide body and fitted with 2 Cummins NHS-B1-6 supercharged engines. The next 2 locos were delivered in 1977 (55 and 56) and were fitted with Cummins NT855 turbocharged engines, the latter built to narrow gauge specifications. Both did not enter service when delivered and were placed in storage, 55 being placed in service in late 1979 and 56 in early 1980. The last 2 (57 and 58) were delivered in 1982, they were fitted with Cummins NT855 turbocharged engines.

In the 1980s, the Rolls-Royce powered locos and the older Cummins supercharged locos were placed into storage due to difficulties in obtaining spare parts. Later many of these were repowered with Cummins NT855 turbocharged engines, those locos which weren't re-engined were either scrapped or sold.

The introduction of a continuous bloom caster at the steelworks in 1987 saw the phasing out of the narrow gauge rail system with the system being closed in 1991 and the narrow gauge rolling stock and locos scrapped.

With the closure of steel making at Newcastle Steelworks on 30 September 1999 and with the remaining rail traffic being hauled by National Rail, the last 9 locos in service were placed into store and put up for sale. A number were sold to private buyers for use as shunters. Two were sold to the Manildra Group, two to Junee Railway Workshop, two to Loongana Lime and one to Heggies Bulk Haul, Port Kembla, the latter being resold to the Manildra Group. Two been preserved by the Dorrigo Steam Railway & Museum and four by the Richmond Vale Railway Museum.

== Class list ==
Locomotive	Builder's No.	Entered service	As Built Engine	Body Widened	Withdrawn	Notes
37	2121-001	13 Jul 1960	Cummins NHS 6	Not widened	16 Jun 1987	Scrapped
38	2121-001	18 Jul 1960	Cummins NHS 6	Not widened	30 Apr 1991	Scrapped
39	2121-003	20 Jul 1960	Cummins NHS 6	Not widened	30 Apr 1991	Scrapped
40	2121-004	15 Aug 1960	Cummins NHS 6	Not widened	1 Nov 1982	Scrapped
41	2121-005	18 Aug 1960	Cummins NHS 6	Not widened	30 Apr 1991	Scrapped
42	3456-006	24 Oct 1960	Cummins NHS 6	Mar 1967	2 Oct 1983	Preserved Richmond Vale Railway Museum
43	3456-007	24 Oct 1960	Cummins NHS 6	Jan 1968	?	Preserved Richmond Vale Railway Museum
44	3456-008	10 Nov 1960	Cummins NHS 6	Feb 1968	26 May 1983	Scrapped
45	3456-009	14 Nov 1960	Cummins NHS 6	Jan 1966	2 Jan 1982	Scrapped
46	3456-010	1 Dec 1960	Cummins NHS 6	Apr 1966	11 Jan 1982	Scrapped
47	3456-011	8 Dec 1960	Cummins NHS 6	Oct 1966	1 Jul 1991	Preserved Dorrigo Steam Railway & Museum
48	4970-012	22 Sep 1961	Rolls-Royce C6TFL	Aug 1966	30 Sep 1999	Sold Manildra Group Dec 2002 as MM04
49	4970-013	29 Sep 1961	Rolls-Royce C6TFL	Feb 1966	30 Sep 1999	Sold Loongana Lime Sep 2002
50	4970-014	14 Oct 1961	Rolls-Royce C6TFL	Dec 1967	30 Sep 1999	Sold Loongana Lime Feb 2002
51	4970-015	3 Nov 1961	Rolls-Royce C6TFL	Oct 1967	30 Sep 1999	Preserved Privately owned
52	4970-016	14 Dec 1961	Rolls-Royce C6TFL	Sep 1966	1 Jan 1988	Preserved Dorrigo Steam Railway & Museum
53	9211-018	16 Apr 1964	Rolls-Royce C6TFL	Jun 1967	30 Sep 1999	Preserved Richmond Vale Railway Museum
54	3835-020	5 Jan 1966	Cummins NHS 6	built wide	30 Sep 1999	Preserved Richmond Vale Railway Museum
55	3275-051	8 Sep 1977	Cummins NT855L4	built wide	30 Sep 1999	Sold Junee Railway Workshop Jul 2002
56	2967-052	11 Nov 1977	Cummins NT855L4	Narrow body	1 Jun 1988	Scrapped
57	6606-182-057	13 Dec 1982	Cummins NT855L4	built wide	30 Sep 1999	Sold Junee Railway Workshop Jul 2002
58	6606-182-058	13 Apr 1983	Cummins NT855L4	built wide	30 Sep 1999	Sold Heggies Bulk Haul, Port Kembla 4 Oct 1999, renumbered HBL58, sold to Manildra Group

== Other buyers ==
The General Electric 80 Ton switcher locomotive design was used by other industrial manufacturing companies around New South Wales including Sulphide Corporation who purchased one in November 1964 for its Cockle Creek Smelter, Southern Portland Cement who purchased two in July 1967 for use at Marulan South and Berrima, and John Lysaght who purchased one for use at Port Kembla.
