= Charles Upfold =

English soap manufacturer (1834–1919)

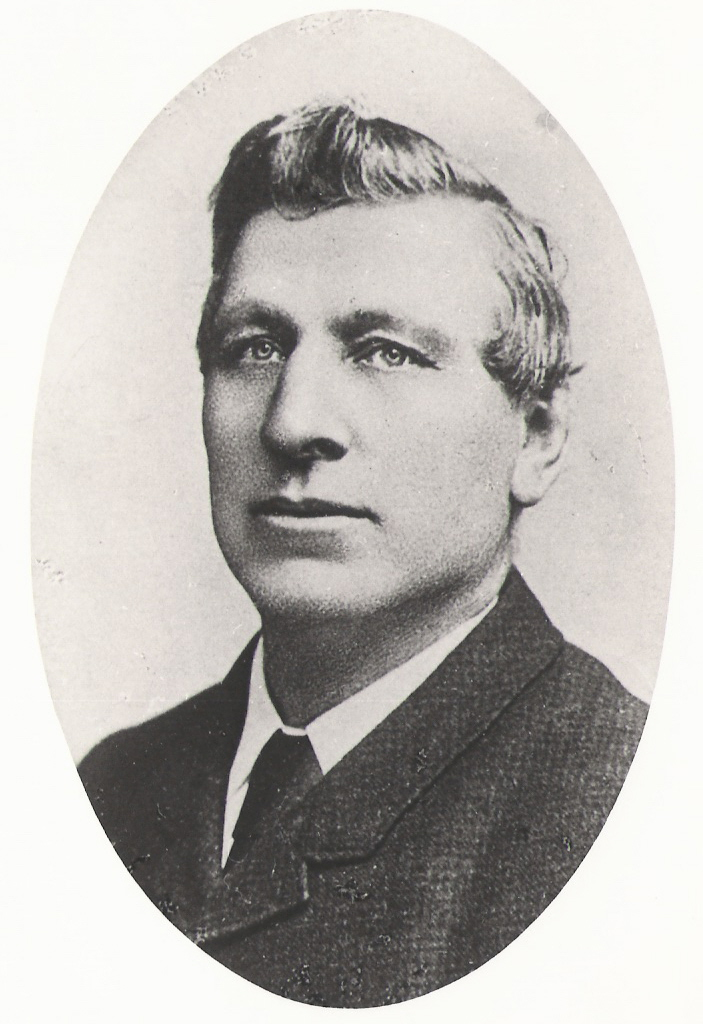
- Born: 15 December 1834; Walworth, England
- Died: 14 March 1919 (aged 84)
- Burial place: Gore Hill Cemetery

Charles Upfold (15 December 1834 – 14 March 1919), Justice of the Peace, was an English soap manufacturer in Australia. He was also a Director of Aberdare Collieries Co. Ltd., and the Chairman of the board of management for its railways.

== Family and background ==
Upfold was born in Grove Street, Walworth Common, (both now gone), Surrey (today Walworth, London), then a prosperous middle-class district. His father, John Upfold, was a fellmonger. Upfold was baptised in Sir John Soane's new St.Peter's Church of England at Walworth, on 7 January 1835. An excellent photograph of this splendid church can be found on page 206 of London's Churches by Christopher Hibbert.

Upfold served his apprenticeship as a soap maker with John Knight & Co. at their Wapping soapworks in London, just across the river from the parishes where Upfold's father resided and worked. Knight's Castile soap is still sold today. His sister, Eliza, married James Knight. Upfold was later a Director of Knights.

Upfold appears on the UK 1851 Census Return, with his parents and married sister Eliza Knight at 11 Brandon Street, parish of St.Mary Newington, London, (then in Surrey), where he is described as a "soap maker".

== Business in New South Wales ==
In 1860 he was already engaged in business in New South Wales and upon his marriage at West Maitland, New South Wales in 1864 (to Sarah, née Blundell, from Finchley), he was described as a "soap maker". When his first son, John, was born in 1865 at Morpeth, New South Wales, Upfold was described as a soap-boiler, aged 27 years and born at Walworth, London, England. When his son Robert was born in 1869, Upfold was described as a "soap manufacturer".

That year, Upfold purchased the soap and candle factory of Frederick Nainby at Wickham and Honeysuckle Point, Newcastle, and in the Newcastle Chronicle of 16 May 1869 there is a reference to the "Great Northern Soap and Candle Works, proprietor, Charles Upfold." By the following year Upfolds plants were producing 9,420 hundredweight of soap and 600 cwt of candles. By 1872 soap production had increased to 21,000 cwt. Most was exported, much to China. That year Upfold expanded his Australian trading links by establishing a Sydney office at 50 Clarence Street.

In 1877, Upfold had been back in London and visiting factories in England. The following year he is listed under Wickham, in Newcastle, "Charles Upfold, soap manufacturer". Also in Wickham were Upfold's three brothers-in-law, Albert, James, and John Blundell, who came from Finchley, Middlesex, (north London), and were clearly all working for Upfold as their occupations are given as soap-boilers.

== Expansion ==
In 1885, Upfold was rapidly expanding his industrial base, having purchased further land at Newcastle, this time from Peter Crebert, a wine merchant, whose daughter Elizabeth would later marry Upfold's eldest son, John. Upfold's company called for tenders for the building of a new works costing £50,000, and the installation of machinery valued at a further £83,000, on a twenty two acres site at Port Waratah, close to the Ferndale Colliery at Tighe's Hill, whence cheap coal was expected. The soap making equipment was the 'newest American' but English manufacturers had supplied the candle making plant. These works were the largest in Australia.

A journalist wrote in 1886: "A representative of this journal called at the Tighe's Hill Soap Works on Saturday last to see what progress was being made. There are four distinct departments: 1. The manufacture of soap – toilet, household and soft, 2. Stearine and parafine candles, 3. Refining glycerine, 4. Making all kinds of lubricating oils and machinery grease. The soap department is very nearly in full swing. Toilet soap was started last Saturday. Large quantities of candles are being turned out, which have to be pronounced up to the highest standard, imported or colonial. Preparations are in full swing for exhibiting the works in the fullest manner on the occasion of Lord & Lady Carrington's visit. At the Wickham works plant is being erected for the manufacture of blue, blacking and grocer's sundries. Altogether, this is one of the most gigantic undertakings of its kind in Australia."

He eventually controlled the colony's largest soap industry – The Sydney Soap and Candle Company, in which John Ambrose Kitchen, who had a small factory at Melbourne, had a minority interest, was registered 25 July 1885. As the name implies, the registered office, along with a smaller factory at Botany, was at Sydney, the capital city of the colony, but the biggest works by far were at Tighes Hill, Newcastle. Probably their most famous product, one which stood the test of time, was Siren soap, which was later renamed Velvet. It was still being marketed in N.S.W., by Unilever in the latter part of the 20th century. Many argued that it was superior to Lever Bros famous Sunlight soap.

In the 1888 Official Post Office Directory for New South Wales, Newcastle District, (p. 424), there appears "Upfold, Charles, soap factory".

On 6 April 1895, the Newcastle Morning Herald carried a large article entitled "Departure of Mr Charles Upfold – Citizen's Send-off". Upfold was about to depart for England, Europe and America, and a large function was given in his honour at the Centennial Hotel in Newcastle, with an impressive guest list of local worthies. He returned from that overseas trip at the end of September and another large article describing his tour appeared in the same newspaper on 3 October 1895.

In 1895, the Port Waratah works employed over 500 people. In 1898 his son, Robert Wallace Upfold, now manager of the soap and candle factory, was married to Clara, daughter of John Scholey, (a local landowner and colliery proprietor from Leeds; described in the 1901 Federal Directory as a "gentleman"). Upfold, the father, is described on the certificate as "Managing Director – Soap Works". Robert had a residence in Woodstock Street, North Waratah, and the 1901 Federal Directory of Newcastle & District records him as a "manufacturer".

On 21 October 1899, Upfold was mentioned as being on the committee of the Newcastle Chamber of Commerce.

The late professor John Turner wrote: "the modern technology and large scale of the Sydney Soap and Candle Company made it the outstanding industrial establishment of its kind. Upfold had wide experience of colonial conditions and constructed his Port Waratah works on recent British and American lines, in a location which gave unequalled access to tallow and coal."

He appears to have taken an additional interest in mining. In 1897 he was part of a syndicate which was proposing to purchase a gold mine at Barraba, New South Wales. In 1904 he was also a Director (along with his friend John Scholey) of Aberdare Collieries Co.Ltd., and the Chairman of the board of management for its railways.

On 2 September 1899 he left Sydney on board the Oceanic Steamship Company's RMS Alameda for Samoa to arrange for purchases of shipments of copra.

== Civic, family, and death ==
In 1871, Upfold was an Alderman on the Wickham Municipal Council, Newcastle. and he was still there in 1878 when he held Tighe's Hill Ward. However the following year he resigned. In 1884 through to 1896, he was an elected Alderman on Waratah Municipal Council, near Newcastle.

On 9 September 1887 he was made a magistrate and frequently sat upon the bench.

Upfold was listed as vice-president of the New Year's Day "Newcastle Regatta" in 1893 and 1900.

In March 1893 Upfold and his eldest son Robert contracted serious food poisoning after eating tinned meat on a picnic. They were reported as being in a "very bad way" in Newcastle Hospital.

In 1899 he is mentioned as a vice-president of the Newcastle Agricultural, Horticultural, and Industrial Association (Patron, Lord Beauchamp), more commonly known as the Newcastle Show Society, when it was negotiating with the Australian Agricultural Company for land for a showground.

On 26 February 1900 Upfold laid the Foundation Stone of the Tighe's Hill School of Arts, Newcastle. The stone remains in situ today. He was involved in the Victoria Theatre Company which erected, in 1890, Newcastle's first theatre of an international standard. For many years he was also a member of the committee of the Newcastle Jockey Club.

Upfold built a large mansion on a piece of land in Crebert Street, North Waratah (now Mayfield), given to him by his friend John Scholey. It was later sold to the famous biscuit manufacturer William Arnott who sold it in 1898 to Isaac Winn, owner of the big Newcastle department store. It is today a home for the aged, owned by the Methodist Church. Upfold subsequently purchased a small estate, 'Orange Grove', near Raymond Terrace, containing extensive orchards, vineyards, and a dairy farm, where he built another fine country residence. He subsequently retired and moved to Chatswood, Sydney, where he died.

Upfold and his wife, Sarah Ann Temperance (née Blundell) (b. 1843, Finchley Common, – d.1921, Cronulla, Sydney) had ten children: four sons and six daughters.

Following his death the Upfold shares were bought by Lever Bros who were busy acquiring the paid up capital of Kitchen & Co., of Melbourne, Victoria, who had merged during The Great War with the Sydney Soap & Candle Co. John H. Kitchen, Managing Director of the Sydney Soap & Candle Company, testified in an Inquiry in Sydney on Friday 7 December 1917 that in 1914 Lever Brothers in England had acquired one-fifth of the company shares. This new amalgamated firm later became Lever & Kitchen.

Eventually, Levers gained full control and dropped the 'Kitchen' altogether. With the decline in candle-making, the Sino-Japanese war (much of Upfold's exports went to China – he had warehouses in Canton and his son Robert spoke Cantonese), coupled with the now ageing plant, the Newcastle factory was closed down just before World War II, a great blow to the city. A new factory for the Australian Wire Rope Works was built upon its site.

A very long street in the suburb of Mayfield is named Upfold Street.

Upfold was buried in the Congregational section of the Gore Hill Cemetery, Sydney, his funeral service was conducted by a Church of England minister, Rev. Alfred G.Perkins. There were numerous notices and obituaries in the newspapers following his death.
