= Commonwealth Railways DR class =

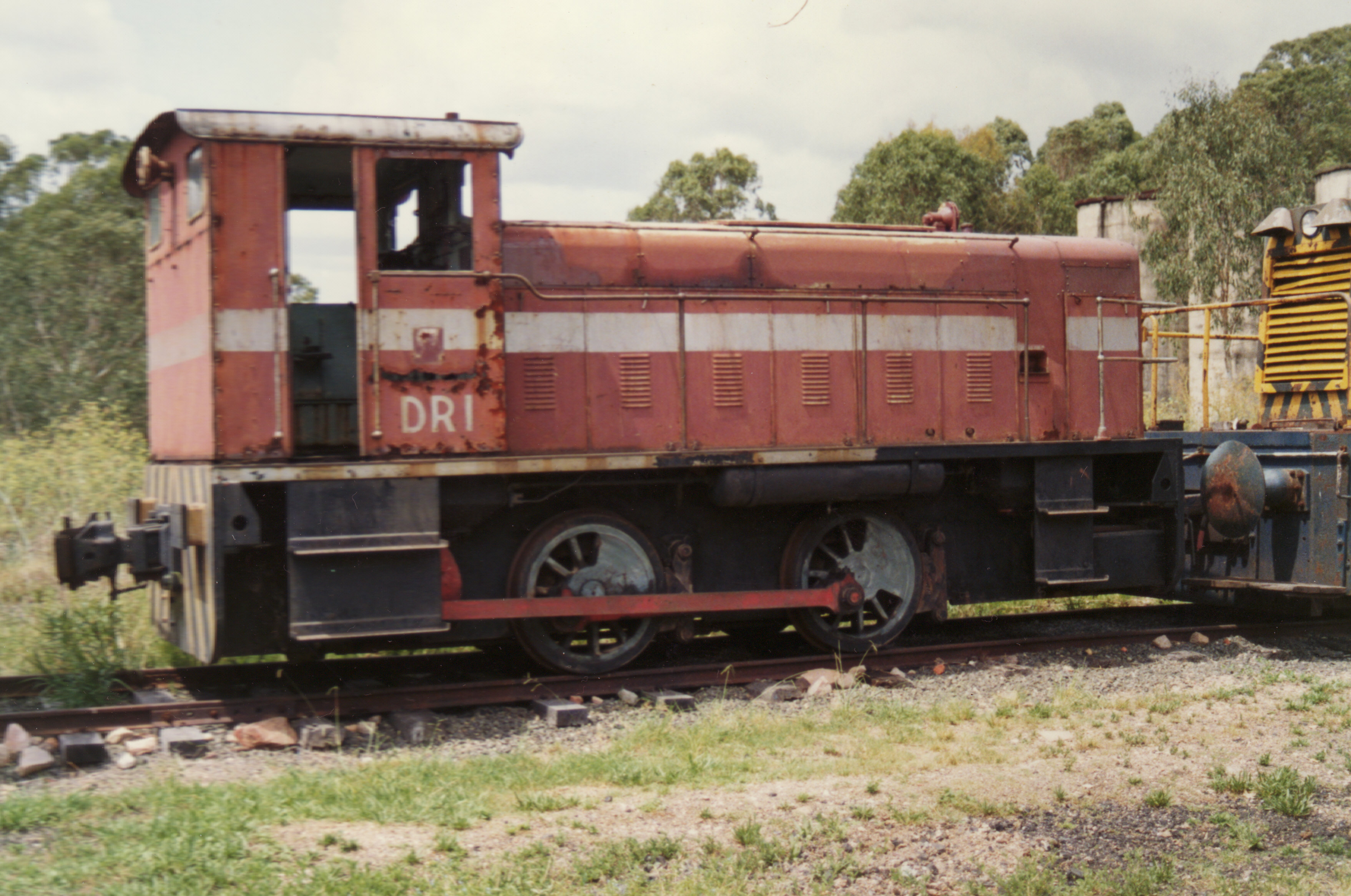
- DR1 at the Richmond Vale Railway Museum in 1990
Type and origin
- Power type: Diesel-mechanical
- Builder: Ruston & Hornsby
- Serial number: 327968
- Model: 165DM
- Build date: 1953
- Total produced: 1
Specifications
- Gauge: 1,435 mm (4 ft 8 1/2 in) standard gauge
- Wheel diameter: 3 ft 2 1/2 in (978 mm)
- Wheelbase: 5 ft 9 in (1,753 mm)
- Length: 7.8 m (25 ft 7 in)
- Width: 2.58 m (8 ft 6 in)
- Height: 3.61 m (11 ft 10 in)
- Loco weight: 28.4 t (28.0 long tons; 31.3 short tons)
- Fuel type: Diesel
- Fuel capacity: 80 imp gal (360 L; 96 US gal)
- Lubricant cap.: 18 imp gal (82 L; 22 US gal)
- Coolant cap.: 26 imp gal (120 L; 31 US gal)
- Prime mover: Ruston & Hornsby Mark 6-VPHL
- Engine type: Four-stroke Inline 6 diesel
- Cylinders: 6
- Cylinder size: 5 1/2 in × 8 in (140 mm × 203 mm)
- Transmission: 4 speeds forward & reverse constant mesh gearbox driving via jackshaft
- Loco brake: Westinghouse type W self lapping air
Performance figures
- Maximum speed: 32 km/h (20 mph)
- Power output: 112 kW (150 hp)
Career
- Operators: Commonwealth Railways
- Number in class: 1
- Numbers: DR1
- First run: 1953
- Disposition: preserved

The DR class was a diesel locomotive built by Ruston & Hornsby for Shell in 1954. Shell used it at their Clyde Refinery before it was sold in 1964 to the Commonwealth Railways. It was withdrawn in 1975 and stored at Port Augusta until 1987 when it was sold to the Richmond Vale Railway Museum.
