= J & A Brown =

J & A Brown was a privately owned Australian coal family firm founded by James Brown (1816–1894) and Alexander Brown (1827–1877).

== Firm's Beginning at Four Mile Creek ==
In 1843 James Brown leased eighty acres at Four Mile Creek, near East Maitland, New South Wales and assisted by his brothers Alexander and John, began to mine outcrop coal for sale in Maitland. They mainly supplied the Hunter River Steam Navigation Company owned steamers at Morpeth. Due to the Browns being able to sell their coal cheaper than the Australian Agricultural Company (A.A. Co.), the A.A. Co. who had a government-granted monopoly on the mining of coal on most lands in New South Wales at the time took the Browns to court. The Browns fought the legal action and moved their operations closer to Morpeth on lands not covered by the A.A. Co's. monopoly. The court action progressed all the way to the Privy Council in England where the Browns lost the court case. However, in 1847 their actions forced a government inquiry into the A.A. Co's. monopoly which recommended that the A.A. Co. forego its monopoly. John Brown (1826-1847) died after becoming overcome by gas during the sinking of a mine shaft at Four Mile Creek in June 1847. A fourth Brown brother, William Brown (1820-1859), was a doctor and only had minimal interest in the family mining firm.

== Move of operations to Newcastle ==
In 1852, after ten years of small-scale mining in the East Maitland area and with the freeing up of mining areas after the A.A. Co. dropped their monopoly on coal mining, James and Alexander Brown moved to the Burwood estate south of Newcastle and built a new mine. This mine was so successful that in 1856 it merged with the neighboring mines on the estate to form the Newcastle Coal & Copper Co. By 1857 J & A Brown owned extensive property assets and businesses in Newcastle including a ship-chandlery and import-export business, and at least one ocean-going ship.

== Move to Minmi ==
In October 1853 J & A Brown purchased two parcels of land at Minmi adjacent to John Eales' existing mine. The haulage rate that Eales asked J & A Brown to pay for moving their coal over his private railway from Minmi to Hexham was too much for the Browns, so they continued operations on the Burwood Estate. However, in 1857 J & A Brown commenced sinking shafts on the land they bought in 1853. By 1859 after one of the shafts had struck poor quality coal, the Browns made John Eales an offer for his existing mines and railway at Minmi, as they had been closed for over a year due to industrial problems. On 3 March 1859 J & A Brown were successful in purchasing the Minmi coal mines and railway from John Eales for £41,000. In 1861 a third coal mine was completed by the Browns which was known as 'C' Pit. Browns also built workshops for the Minmi mines and railway at this mine.

In late 1862 the Browns floated a company named The Melbourne and Newcastle Minmi Coal Company. The Browns retained a half share in this new operation and the Minmi operations were transferred to the new company in February 1863. However this new company was short lived as in June 1864 the mine workings at Minmi were flooded. It took until mid August to dewater the mine workings, and by this stage the new company was in serious financial trouble. In December 1864 the new company was wound up and ownership of the Minmi workings was returned to the Browns once they paid the £17,500 in debts that the company owed. The Minmi mine remained in operation until 1869, when it closed. By then the Browns had transferred their operations to their New Lambton colliery.

== Move to New Lambton ==
In 1861 the Browns commenced development of a new colliery on land near present-day Adamstown which was named Hartley Vale Colliery. The colliery was ready for production but was not being worked as the railway line connecting the colliery to the Government Railways' Great Northern Railway was not complete due to the Browns being unable to gain permission to cross the Scottish Australian Mining Company's railway line to Lambton Colliery. Further collieries were developed by J & A Brown on adjoining lands and in December 1867 an act of parliament called the Hartley Vale Colliery Railway Act was passed which allowed the Browns to complete their railway which had been re-aligned to remove the need to cross the Lambton Colliery line.

In 1873 to raise capital for a return to Minmi, James Brown sold his half share of the New Lambton operations to George Dibbs for £29,000, Alexander Brown kept his share of New Lambton. In 1876 a dispute broke out between Alexander Brown & George Dibbs over Alexander's intention to wind back operations at New Lambton and transfer the affected miners to the Browns' new mine at Minmi. This dispute continued until the death of Alexander Brown in May 1877. The Browns' interests at New Lambton were then managed by Alexander Brown Jnr (1851-1926) who was the son of William Brown. In 1884 after a failed attempt to prove that he was entitled to be a partner in the firm, Alexander Jnr brought out the Browns' remaining interests in New Lambton and sold the share of J & A Brown that had been left to him by his uncle Alexander Snr, to the remaining Brown family members for £25,000. He then continued the New Lambton operations separate to the J & A Brown firm & traded as Alexander Brown & Co.

== The return to Minmi ==
After selling his half share of New Lambton in 1873, James Brown and his son John Brown commenced development of a new colliery on land to the North of the original Minmi workings. This colliery, known as Duckenfield Colliery, entered production in 1874. In 1876 development of a second new colliery to the East of the former workings was started. This colliery which was opened in January 1877 was formally known as Brown's Colliery, it was also locally known as Back Creek Colliery.

== Death of Alexander & James ==
Alexander Brown died suddenly at the age of 50 on 31 May 1877. As he no children he left his share of the company to be split equally amongst his nephews once they reached the age of 21. At the time only John (son of James) and Alexander (son of William) had reached 21. In 1884 after a dispute over his level of interest in the firm Alexander Jnr sold his share of the firm to the remaining family members and no longer took part in the activities of the firm.

After Alexander's death James solely managed the firm until for health reasons he retired from managing the firm in 1887. His eldest son John Brown then managed the firm. James died on 27 September 1894, and left his share of the firm to be equally divided amongst his four sons - John, Alexander, William & John.

James' son Alexander Brown (1857-1897) died on 9 February 1897, leaving the firm in the hands of John, William & Stephen. John and William then traded as J & W Brown until 1913 when due to William wanting to take a more active part in controlling the firm took John Brown to court. William lost the case and the firm remained under the control of John until his death in 1930. After 1913 the firm traded as J & A Brown once more. William died on 2 February 1927 leaving the firm in the hands of John, Stephen and their sister Mary.

From 1843 until 1886 James and Alexander Brown produced more than three million tons of coal and by 1914 the company's total output was more than sixteen million tons. This amounted to about 8 per cent of the total production of New South Wales in that period.

== Shiploader and Workshops at Hexham ==
A ship loading staith consisting of one embankment and two loading chutes was at Hexham when J & A Brown purchased the Minmi coal mines and the Hexham to Minmi railway form John Eales in 1859. A small workshops was also adjacent to this staith. A second staith was added in 1861. Ship loading continued at Hexham until 1 November 1967.

The workshops were also gradually expanded and by 1900 had become the main workshops of J & A Brown. With the closure of Minmi workshops in 1924 the machinery at Minmi was transferred to Hexham. With the formation of JABAS in 1931 the workshops become the main engineering workshop for the company undertaking locomotive repairs, construction and repair of railway wagons and mining equipment for JABAS. In 1951 the workshops were restructured as Hexham Engineering Pty Ltd, this subsidiary company continued until it closed in November 1989, being the last operation that was part of the original J & A Brown firm in operation.

== The Richmond Vale Railway and Pelaw Main & Richmond Main Collieries ==
In May 1897 the firm purchased from the syndicated company headed by John Scholey (the original owner of the land) the partially developed Richmond Vale Colliery located in the Wallis Creek valley near what would be latter known as Kurri Kurri for £39,500. In August 1900, prior to the purchase of Pelaw Main Colliery, J & W Brown had applied for an act of parliament to allow the construction of a railway line connecting their existing Minmi to Hexham railway to Richmond Vale Colliery. In October 1900 the Richmond Vale Coal Mine Railway Act of 1900 was passed by the State Parliament allowing the construction of the railway which was known as the Richmond Vale Railway. In October 1900 J & W Brown brought the nearby Stanford Greta Colliery from the Stanford Greta Coal Company, this company had divided its holding into Stanford Greta and Stanford Merthyr Collieries. As Stanford Greta was on the outcrop of the coal seam it could be developed at a lower cost than Richmond Vale Colliery, so Browns concentrated their efforts on developing this mine which they renamed Pelaw Main Colliery in April 1901. The coal from Pelaw Main was initially sent away via the East Greta Coal Mining Company's Railway to East Greta Junction. Financed by the output of Pelaw Main Colliery, construction of the Richmond Vale Railway commenced in 1904 and was completed to Pelaw Main Colliery in June 1905. From August 1905 all coal from Pelaw Main was hauled by the Browns over this railway to Hexham, the railway line to Richmond Vale Colliery was also fully completed in August that year.

In 1910 work commenced on developing Richmond Vale Colliery with the sinking of the main shaft and the ordering of plant & equipment from England. In 1911 the colliery's name was changed to Richmond Main Colliery. John Brown planned for the colliery to be the showpiece of the J & A Brown empire and so the buildings were constructed from either brick or reinforced concrete. The colliery was to be electrically powered and a large for its time power station was constructed to house the two generator sets along with the main shaft electric winding engine. To supply the bricks required for many of the buildings at Richmond Main, a brickworks was built on land near the colliery. The distinctive red bricks from these brickworks were also used at many other J & A Brown sites. The mine reached full production in 1918 when it was producing 700 tons of coal per day. By the early 1920s the colliery was producing 2,000 tons per day and on 8 August 1928 an Australian record of 3,171 tons produced in a single shift was made. A third shaft was sunk at the colliery in the mid-1920s along with extensions and improvements to the power station. Some of the planned improvements at the colliery were never fully completed due to the 1929-1930 miners' lockout strike and the death of John Brown.

== Stockrington Colliery and the end of Minmi ==
With the coal at seams at Duckenfield and Brown's Collieries nearing the end of being economically mined, development of a colliery in the nearby Stockington Valley was commenced in 1912. This colliery was named Duckenfield No.2 Colliery and was located adjacent the Richmond Vale Railway. However worked stopped on developing this mine in 1914 with only preliminary earthworks carried out.

Duckenfield No.1 Colliery at Minmi closed in April 1916. In 1921 with the impending closure of Brown's Colliery at Minimi work recommenced on developing Duckenfield No.2 Colliery at Stockrington. Industrial problems plagued the development of this colliery and by the time the colliery was completed in 1929 the miners' lockout strike occurred and the colliery was never entered full production under the family firm of J & A Brown. In January 1924 Brown's Colliery No.4 Tunnel, the remaining operating colliery at Minmi was closed due to high operating costs. Duckenfield No.2 Colliery was eventually opened in 1936, by which time it had been renamed Stockrington Colliery.

== Death of John Brown and formation of a public company ==
On 5 March 1930, John Brown, aged 78, who was the main family member running the firm died. Before his death he had already given a large number of his shares in the firm to his good friend Sir Colin Stephen who was the chairman of Abermain Seaham Collieries Ltd. In his will he left his share of the company to Thomas Armstrong (later Sir Thomas Armstrong) who was the firm's general manager and to Sir Adrian Knox who was a Chief Justice of the Australian High Court and a close friend of John Brown from John's horse racing. In his will John Brown wrote regarding the future of the firm after his death. This section of the will read:

I expressly desire that the business of the present firm or partnership of J & A Brown shall be continued on and continued and carried out on in the same firm name during the life of my brother Stephen Brown.

From inheritances from other family members Stephen Brown had a five ninths share in the family firm. However, when offered an amalgamation with Abermain Seaham Collieries Ltd, Stephen took up their offer and arranged the merger of the J & A Brown firm with the publicly listed Abermain Seaham Collieries Limited. With the new publicly listed company being known as J & A Brown & Abermain Seaham Collieries Limited (commonly abbreviated to JABAS). This new company was formally incorporated on 19 January 1931 with a nominal capital of £4 million, and became the largest coal producer in New South Wales. From that time the surviving member of the Brown family Stephen Brown served as a director in the new public company.

In 1960, JABAS merged with Caledonian Collieries Limited to form Coal & Allied Industries Limited. After this merger, JABAS become the subsidiary company that carried out the mining operations of Coal & Allied until being renamed Coal & Allied Operations Pty Ltd in 1980. From 2013 to 2017, Coal & Allied Operations Pty Ltd is a subsidiary of Rio Tinto Coal Australia. In 2017 it was purchased by Yancoal Australia Limited, a subsidiary of Yanzhou Coal Mining Company.
