= Bavarian Pt 2/4 N =

Bavarian Pt 2/4 N DRG Class 72.1
Type and origin
- Builder: Krauss
- Build date: 1909
- Total produced: 2
Specifications
- Configuration
  - Whyte: 4-4-0T
- Gauge: 1,435 mm (4 ft 8 1/2 in)
- Leading dia.: 800 mm (2 ft 7 1/2 in)
- Driver dia.: 1,250 mm (4 ft 1 1/4 in)
- Length
  - Over beams: 9,065 mm (29 ft 9 in)
- Axle load: 13.2 t (13.0 long tons; 14.6 short tons)
- Adhesive weight: 26.2 t (25.8 long tons; 28.9 short tons)
- Service weight: 39.0 t (38.4 long tons; 43.0 short tons)
- Fuel capacity: 1,100 kg (2,400 lb)
- Water cap.: 6 m^{3} (1,300 imp gal; 1,600 US gal)
- Boiler
- No. of heating tubes: 155
- Heating tube length: 3,500 mm (11 ft 5 3/4 in)
- Boiler pressure: 12 kgf/cm^{2} (1,180 kPa; 171 lbf/in^{2})
- Heating surface
  - Firebox: 1.22 m^{2} (13.1 sq ft)
  - Evaporative: 73.56 m^{2} (791.8 sq ft)
- Cylinders: 2
- Cylinder size: 350 mm (13 3/4 in)
- Piston stroke: 500 mm (19 11/16 in)
Performance figures
- Maximum speed: 65 km/h (40 mph)
Career
- Numbers: K.Bay.Sts.E.: 6501–6502; DRG: 72 101 – 78 102
- Retired: 1928

The Bavarian Pt 2/4 N was a steam locomotive with the Royal Bavarian State Railways (Königlich Bayerische Staatsbahn). It was developed in parallel with the Bavarian Pt 2/3 and for the same duties. Instead of a fixed carrying axle it was given a bogie. This change brought no advantage, so the more cost-effective Pt 2/3 was favoured. The two Pt 2/4 N engines were nevertheless taken over by the Reichsbahn, but were retired by 1928.

== See also ==
- Royal Bavarian State Railways
- List of Bavarian locomotives and railbuses
