= New South Wales X200 class locomotive =

Class of Australian shunting tractors

New South Wales X200 class (Mark 1: X201–X206)
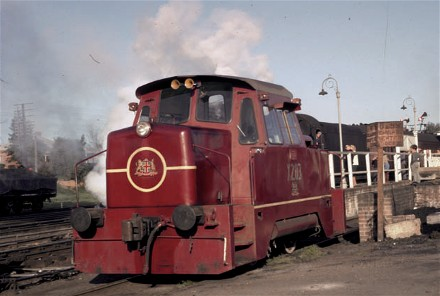
- X203 at Wagga Wagga while a steam hauled enthusiast special stand at the platform on 19 September 1965
Type and origin
- Power type: Diesel-mechanical
- Builder: Chullora Railway Workshops
- Total produced: 6
Specifications
- Configuration
  - UIC: B
- Gauge: 4 ft 8 1/2 in (1,435 mm) standard gauge
- Wheel diameter: 36 in (914 mm)
- Wheelbase: 6 ft 6 in (1.98 m)
- Length: Over headstocks: 20 ft 7 1/2 in (6.29 m), Over coupler pulling faces: 24 ft 0 in (7.32 m)
- Width: 9 ft 0 3/16 in (2.748 m)
- Height: 11 ft 3 in (3.43 m)
- Axle load: 15 long tons 0 cwt (33,600 lb or 15.2 t)
- Loco weight: 30 long tons 0 cwt (67,200 lb or 30.5 t)
- Fuel type: Diesel
- Fuel capacity: 156 imp gal (709 L; 187 US gal)
- Lubricant cap.: Engine: 8 imp gal (36.4 L; 9.6 US gal), Transmission: 13.75 imp gal (62.5 L; 16.5 US gal), Final drive: 6 imp gal (27.3 L; 7.2 US gal)
- Coolant cap.: 15 imp gal (68 L; 18 US gal)
- Sandbox cap.: 4.5 cu ft (0.13 m^{3})
- Prime mover: Hercules DFXH-F
- RPM range: 650–1850
- Engine type: Four-stroke diesel
- Aspiration: Naturally aspirated
- Cylinders: 6
- Cylinder size: 5.75 in × 6 in (146 mm × 152 mm)
- Transmission: Allison CRT5631-8, with NSWGR design final drive
Performance figures
- Maximum speed: 24 mph (39 km/h)
- Power output: Gross: 260 hp (194 kW) at 2100 rpm, For traction: 200 hp (149 kW)
- Tractive effort: Continuous: 17,750 lbf (78.96 kN) at 2.5 mph (4.0 km/h)
Career
- Operators: New South Wales Government Railways
- Numbers: X201–X206
- First run: 2 December 1963
- Preserved: X203, X204, X206
- Disposition: 3 preserved, 3 scrapped

New South Wales X200 class (Mark 2: X207–X218)
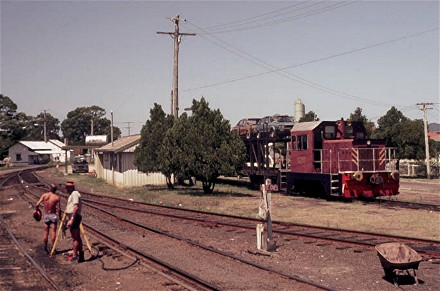
- X217 shunts the Gold Coast Motorail at Murwillumbah
Type and origin
- Power type: Diesel-mechanical
- Builder: Chullora Railway Workshops
- Total produced: 12
Specifications
- Configuration
  - UIC: B
- Gauge: 4 ft 8 1/2 in (1,435 mm) standard gauge
- Wheel diameter: 36 in (914 mm)
- Wheelbase: 7 ft 0 in (2.13 m)
- Length: Over headstocks: 20 ft 9 in (6.32 m), Over coupler pulling faces: 24 ft 1 1/2 in (7.35 m)
- Width: 9 ft 0 3/8 in (2.753 m)
- Height: 12 ft 7 1/16 in (3.84 m)
- Axle load: 15 long tons 0 cwt (33,600 lb or 15.2 t)
- Loco weight: 30 long tons 0 cwt (67,200 lb or 30.5 t)
- Fuel type: Diesel
- Fuel capacity: 156 imp gal (709 L; 187 US gal)
- Lubricant cap.: Engine: 5.875 imp gal (26.7 L; 7.1 US gal), Transmission: 13.75 imp gal (62.5 L; 16.5 US gal), Final drive: 6 imp gal (27.3 L; 7.2 US gal)
- Coolant cap.: 17.5 imp gal (80 L; 21 US gal)
- Sandbox cap.: 4.5 cu ft (0.13 m^{3})
- Prime mover: Cummins NHRS-6-BI
- RPM range: 625–1900
- Engine type: Four-stroke diesel
- Aspiration: Scavenge-blown
- Cylinders: 6
- Cylinder size: 5.125 in × 6 in (130.2 mm × 152.4 mm)
- Transmission: Allison CRT5631-6, with NSWGR design final drive
Performance figures
- Maximum speed: 32 mph (51 km/h)
- Power output: Gross: 290 hp (216 kW) at 2100 rpm, For traction: 260 hp (194 kW)
- Tractive effort: Continuous: 17,750 lbf (78.96 kN) at 3.6 mph (5.8 km/h)
Career
- Operators: New South Wales Government Railways
- Numbers: X207–X218
- First run: 1967
- Preserved: X214, X215, X217
- Disposition: 3 preserved, 9 scrapped

The X200 class were a class of rail tractors introduced in 1963 and operated by the New South Wales Government Railways of Australia. They were a development of the smaller and less numerous X100 class. The X200 class remained in service until 1990 when they were either withdrawn or sold off to private companies, and some remain operational today.

== Mark 1 series ==
The Mark 1 series of the X200 class were 3 times more powerful and twice as heavy as the X100 class. Six examples were built and numbered X201-X206.

They were built using a number of steam locomotive spare parts. They were built on the inner bogies of the AD60 Beyer-Garratt class locomotives, and used spare C36 class locomotive windows in their cabs. Their engines were rated at 260 hp (190 kW) at 2,100 rpm and had a top speed of 24 mph. The rounded shapes of the hoods and cab gave it a baby-brother appearance to the main line 42 and 44 classes. The addition of a train brake allowed them to be run on the main line and also to be used as replacements for various ageing shunting locomotives. X201 was the first of the class entering service in December 1963. The six Mark 1s were initially used in the Sydney metropolitan network, but did later find their ways beyond this region.

== Mark 2 series ==
The Mark 2 series of the X200 class were different again. Twelve examples were built and numbered X207-X218.

They were built on the outer bogies of the AD60 Beyer-Garratt class locomotives. Their engines were more powerful rated at 290 hp (220 kW) at 2,100 rpm and they had a higher top speed of 32 mph. This made them more practical for light line use. One was even rostered on to the Yass Tramway, previously the domain of the Z13 class tank locomotives. The Z13 class were called back to Yass during periods after the X-200 failed due to transmission faults. The exterior design of the Mark 2 was squarer, giving it the appearance of a baby-brother to the 49 class diesel locomotives.

The first six were built in 1967. The second six being an additional order, were placed into traffic from May 1968, with the final member of the class entering service in December 1968. Despite differences in engine horsepower ratings, both variants were rated as having a tractive effort of 17,750 lbf (79.0 kN). This was more powerful than many of the typical small and workshop steam shunting locomotives of the time.

== Summary ==
The X200 class was considered (by the NSWGR commissioners and workers) to be largely successful as they began to replace the various ageing steam shunting locomotives in various depots of the time. They were cleaner, more efficient to run, requiring less maintenance, and also giving locomotive crews more comfortable working conditions. Another indicator of the class's success is that several examples are still (as of November 2025) operational at an age of around 45 years. However, with the ever-changing nature of the rail fright industry in the 21st century, it is hard to keep a 100% accurate listing of their current owners and operational areas.

Some steam shunting locomotives of New South Wales Railways compared to an X200 class
Type	Power	Wheel Arrangement	Total weight
X200 Rail Tractor	17,750 lbf	0-4-0	30T
Z13 (4-4-2T)	13,000 lbf	4-4-2T	54T
Z18 (0-6-0T)	11,550 lbf	0-6-0T	31T
X10 (F351 2-4-0T)	9,090 lbf	2-4-0T	38T
X1044	6,050 lbf		
X1046/X1047	12,540 lbf		
X10 (7-ton luffing crane)	14,900 lbf	0-4-0T	39T

There is a certain amount of confusion with the numbering in this class. The numbers specified above apply to the class when first issued to traffic. In later years a certain amount of number-swapping was carried out by workshops. The biggest confusion being X101 and X212 swapping numbers, being two completely different types of locomotive. X217 and X218 later became X117 and X118, confusing the matter further. It appears that members of the X200 class were indiscriminately re-numbered into the X100 series. Many other examples of renumbering exist, for the purposes of research it is often easier to refer to individual locomotives by their numbers when first issued to traffic and to note any number changes in brackets as below.

== Remaining examples ==
=== Preserved ===
- X204 (now X104) and X214 are at the Dorrigo Steam Railway & Museum
- X203 at the Yass Railway Heritage Centre Yass Railway Museum
- X206 at Transport Heritage NSW's Valley Heights Locomotive Depot Heritage Museum, operational for fire ban days and shunting purposes.
- X213 belongs to the Coffee Pot Group
- X215 (now X115) and X217 is preserved at the Richmond Vale Railway Museum with X217 operational at Richmond Main after having a cosmetic restoration by volunteers. X215 remains stored in an un-operational state.
- Dorrigo Steam Railway and Museum owns all 3 examples of the X100/X200, the only place where all 3 types are preserved. Dorrigo owns X102, X204 (1st series) and X214 (second series).
