= BHP Newcastle 32 class =

Class of diesel locomotives

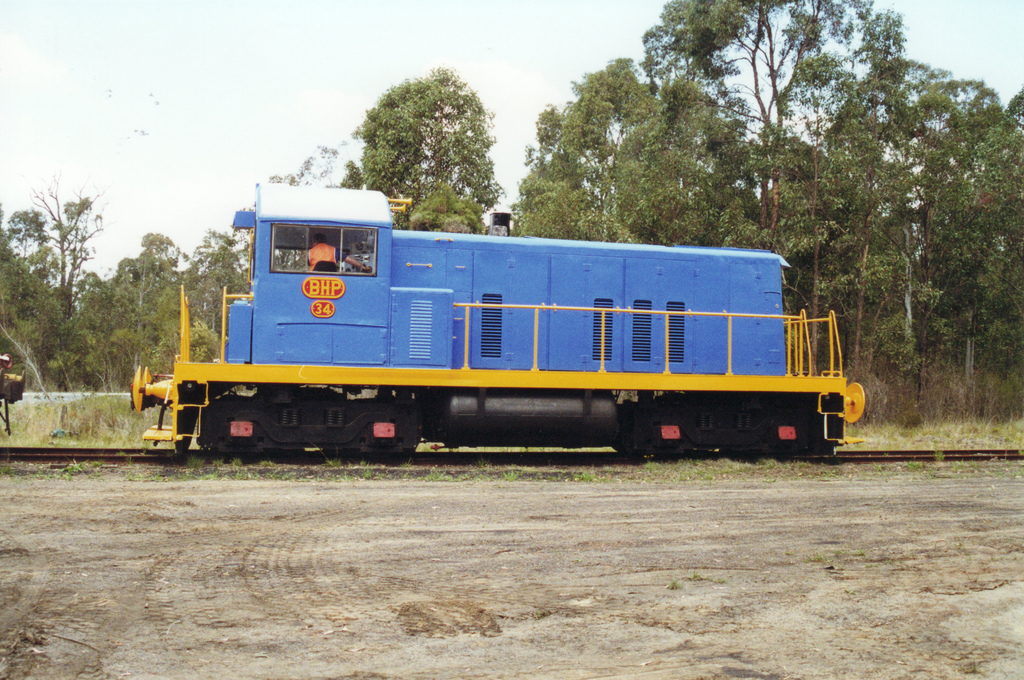
- 34 at Richmond Vale Railway Museum in September 2000
Type and origin
- Power type: Diesel-electric
- Builder: A Goninan & Co, Broadmeadow
- Model: General Electric 70 Ton switcher
- Build date: 1954-56
- Total produced: 5
Specifications
- Configuration
  - UIC: Bo-Bo
- Gauge: 1,435 mm (4 ft 8 1/2 in) standard gauge
- Wheel diameter: 33 in (838 mm)
- Minimum curve: 75 ft 0 in (22.86 m)
- Length: 38 ft 10 in (11.84 m)
- Width: 9 ft 9 in (2,972 mm)
- Height: 13 ft 11 in (4,242 mm)
- Fuel type: Diesel
- Fuel capacity: 400 imp gal (1,800 L; 480 US gal)
- Lubricant cap.: 100 imp gal (450 L; 120 US gal)
- Coolant cap.: 80 imp gal (360 L; 96 US gal)
- Sandbox cap.: 12 cu ft (0.34 m^{3})
- Prime mover: Cooper Bessemer FWL-6-T
- RPM range: 350-1010
- Engine type: 4 stroke, 6 in line, diesel
- Aspiration: Turbocharged
- Generator: General Electric GT-571
- Traction motors: 4 off General Electric GE-747
- Cylinders: 6
- Cylinder size: 9 in × 10.5 in (230 mm × 270 mm) bore x stroke
- Loco brake: Westinghouse A7; Railway air brake
- Train brakes: Westinghouse AH7
Performance figures
- Power output: Gross: 627 hp (470 kW), For traction: 600 hp (450 kW)
Career
- Operators: BHP Newcastle Steelworks
- Number in class: 5
- Numbers: 32-36
- Preserved: 32, 34
- Disposition: 2 preserved, 3 scrapped

The BHP Newcastle 32 class were a class of diesel locomotives built by A Goninan & Co, Broadmeadow for the BHP, Newcastle Steelworks between 1954 and 1956.

== History ==
In 1954 BHP took delivery of three GE 70-ton switchers for use on its Newcastle Steelworks network from A Goninan & Co, Broadmeadow with a further two delivered in 1956.

== Class list ==
Locomotive	Builder's No	Entered service	Withdrawn	Notes
32	1/S0001	Jul 1954	Aug 1986	preserved on static display at the Richmond Vale Railway Museum
33	2/S0002	Aug 1954	Feb 1987	-
34	3/S0003	Dec 1954	Jan 1990	stored at the Richmond Vale Railway Museum
35	10/S3006	Dec 1956	Aug 1988	-
36	11/S3007	Dec 1956	Jun 1985	-
