= Richmond Main Colliery =

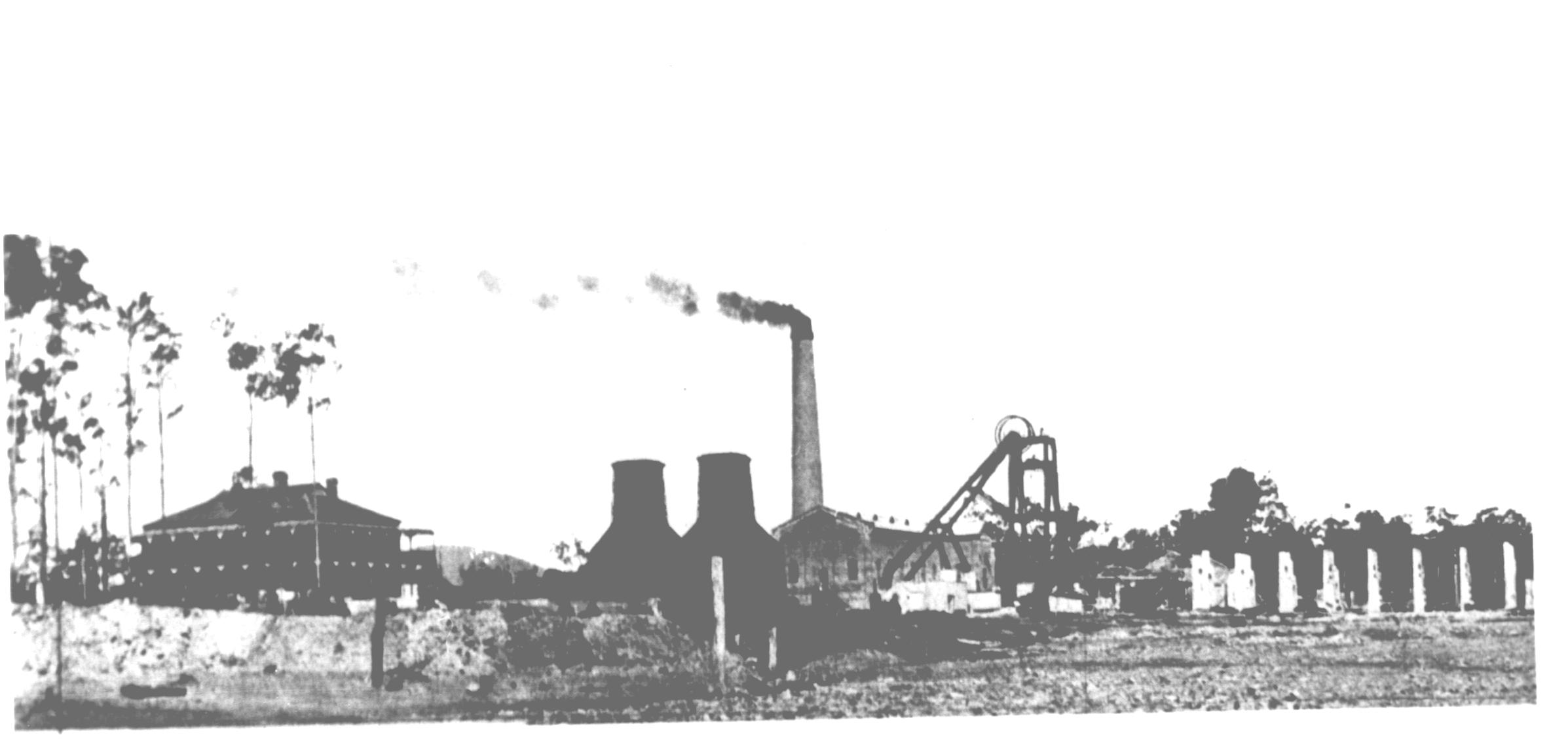
- Heritage boundaries

- Location within New South Wales Location within Australia
- 32.8581°S 151.4791°E
- Location: South Maitland Coalfields, Kurri Kurri, New South Wales, Australia

History
- Built: 1908–1913
- Built for: J & A Brown
- Demolished: 1967 (partly)

Site notes
- Architect(s): J & A Brown's Engineering Workshops, Hexham
- Owner: Cessnock City Council

New South Wales Heritage Register
- Official name: Richmond Main Colliery; Richmond Vale Colliery; South Maitland Railway (SMR)
- Type: state heritage (complex / group)
- Designated: 2 April 1999
- Reference no.: 16
- Type: Other - Mining and Mineral Processing
- Category: Mining and Mineral Processing
- Builders: The J & A Brown Company

Richmond Main Colliery is a heritage-listed former coal mine and now open-air museum at South Maitland Coalfields, Kurri Kurri, New South Wales, Australia. It was designed by the staff at J & A Brown's Engineering Workshops at Hexham under the direction of John Brown and built from 1908 to 1913 by J & A Brown. The site now operates as the Richmond Main Heritage Park, including the Richmond Vale Railway Museum and Richmond Main Mining Museum. The property is owned by Cessnock City Council. It was added to the New South Wales State Heritage Register on 2 April 1999.

== History ==
The Richmond Main Colliery was one of the largest and most important shaft mines of the early twentieth century. It is situated in what was formerly known as the Richmond Vale area because of the large estate "Richmond Vale". This area was part of the more widely known South Maitland coal field. It straddles the land owned by Charles William Roemer, one of the first German immigrant settlers, and Arthur Mackenzie whose land included that granted to Lieutenant John Palmer, a purser on the "Sirius", in 1823.

The area was used for farming and grazing until the 1880s and the discovery of rich coal seams in the area by the government geologist Tannat William Edgeworth David, these coal seams becoming known as the Greta Coal Measures. Reports on the seam were made public on the eve of a mining boom and entrepreneurs were quick to exploit his work.

=== Formation of the Richmond Vale Coal Company ===
In 1886 a syndicate based in Melbourne was formed, which then established the Richmond Vale Coal Company. This company then purchased the Richmond Vale Estate in early 1887. Boring operations were undertaken in 1887 to prove the coal seam, which was proven to be 4 m (14.5 ft) in thickness at a depth of 212 m (696 ft).

Shaft sinking commenced in October 1888. This shaft was 4 m (12 ft) in diameter and was completed in August 1890. The company then attempted to raise the capital to develop the colliery and the construction of a rail line. The company was unsuccessful in this undertaking and a new company was formed in 1895. This new company was also unsuccessful in raising capital and the property was put up for auction in July 1897. The property was bought at the auction held on 15 July 1897 by J & A Brown for the sum of £39,500.

=== Purchase of Pelaw Main Colliery and construction of the Richmond Vale Railway ===
In 1900 to allow the Richmond Vale Colliery site to be developed, J & A Brown applied for an act of parliament to allow the construction of a railway line from their existing Minmi to Hexham railway line (at a location later known as Minmi Junction) to Richmond Vale Colliery. The Richmond Vale Coal-mine Railway Act was assented to by the New South Wales Legislative Assembly on 20 October 1900. In October 1900 before construction of the line which would be known as the Richmond Vale Railway had commenced the Browns had purchased the Stanford Greta Colliery, which was adjacent to the Richmond Vale Colliery. Work was concentrated at this colliery as it could be developed at a much lower cost due to it being a drift colliery sunk into the seam outcrop. Stanford Greta colliery was also adjacent to the Stanford Merthyr Colliery owned by the East Greta Coal Mining Company, which was also under development this included a rail line to Maitland.

In 1901 The name of Stanford Greta Colliery was changed to Pelaw Main Colliery. In November 1901 Pelaw Main Colliery commenced production with the coal being railed out via the East Greta Co.'s line to East Greta Junction at Maitland. Construction of J & A Brown's own Richmond Vale Railway did not commence until early 1904, with construction of the line to Pelaw Main completed June 1905, with the branch line to Richmond Vale Colliery being completed in August 1905.

=== Development and construction ===
After the completion of the rail line to the colliery in August 1905, the mine was dewatered and a minimal amount of development work was carried out to the underground workings. Development work commenced in 1910 with the sinking of the main No.2 shaft along with the ordering of major equipment such as the head frame, boilers and power station equipment. John Brown spent large sums to ensure that his mining plant, colliery railways, steamships and engineering works were substantially built and in the forefront of technological development.

In August 1911 the colliery's name was changed from Richmond Vale Colliery to Richmond Main Colliery. Shaft sinking operations were halted for a period in 1912 whilst the permanent headframe was erected over the shaft. During 1912 the power station building was constructed along with the boiler house and chimney. In 1913 the colliery office was constructed. To allow the construction of the other surface buildings a brickworks was constructed beside the Richmond Vale Junction to Richmond Main railway line. This brickworks produced the distinctive "Richmond Main red" bricks use at Richmond Main and many other J & A Brown operations.

In July 1914 sinking of No.2 shaft was completed and was 7 m (22 ft) feet in diameter and bricked from top to bottom and has been described as incomparable with any other in the country, even in its final days.

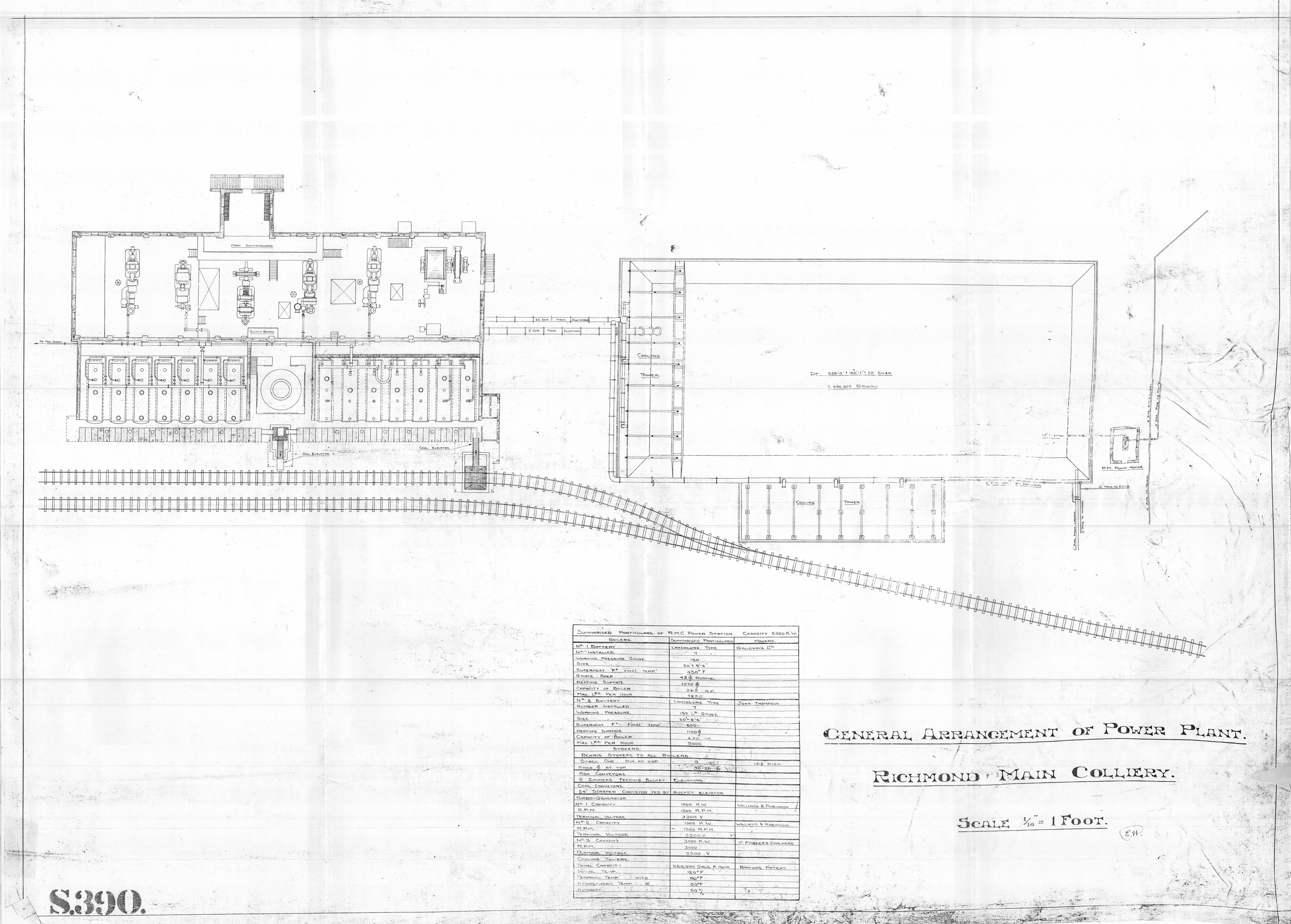
Plan showing arrangement of plant in the Power Station at Richmond Main Colliery prior to the installation of the 3 water tube boilers.

In 1914 9,830 tonnes (9,670 long tons) of coal was produced. The mine workings had been opened out enough to allow the installation of seven Ingersoll Rand compressed air coal cutters. In 1915-15 the elevated gantry from the main shaft pit top building to the screens buildings, along with the screening buildings and equipment, along with the rail sidings were under construction. Whilst the mine was nearing completion it was plagued by industrial action by the miners and only produced 1,500 tonnes (1,500 long tons) of coal during 1916. During 1916 the locomotive shed and the 3,000 tonnes (3,000 long tons) small coal bin were built. The pit top and screening plant was completed by June 1917. In February 1917 the miners had returned from strike and in the period up to August 1917 the mine had produced 7,000 tonnes (6,900 long tons) of coal. However, from August 1917 through to early 1918 the mine was plagued by industrial action. For the remained of 1918 the mine was in full production and produced 170,000 tonnes (167,000 long tons) of coal.

=== Record production and further expansion ===
The Colliery reached peak annual production in 1928 with 507,000 tons of saleable coal.

=== Downturn and closure ===
The 1929 Lockout followed by the Great Depression, the 1949 strike, a recession in the coal industry and the change to mechanisation in the 1950s and 1960s were major setbacks which the colliery, and the South Maitland field generally, would not recover from.

On 7 July 1967, the Richmond Collery ceased operation leaving eighty mine workers unemployed. This was a far smaller number than the 1200 who had been employed at the site in the late 1920s. The colliery continued to supply power to the state grid until 1976. Maintenance problems and the salvage value of much of the equipment resulted in the stripping out of the machinery and the demolition of the main head frames.

=== Preservation ===
The site was acquired by the Greater Cessnock City Council for the development of the site into a mining park. The Richmond Vale Preservation Co-op Society Ltd was formed in 1979. It has been instrumental in returning some of the buildings and structures to their operating function in order to restore and maintain steam rolling stock and carriages and the rail line has been relaid. The society operate the Richmond Vale Railway Museum at the former colliery.

=== Modifications and dates ===
- 1908-1913 - initial construction stage - Power House complex and main shaft built.
- 1914-21 - increase of ancillary buildings on site, including main ventilation machinery over old shaft
- 1921-25 - expansion of several buildings, including Fan Building. Passenger rail platform constructed.
- 1926-28 - replacement of boiler installation and the sinking of a third shaft with the attendant pit top structures
- 1980s - rail line relaid

== Description of structures and buildings ==
Administration building

Dating from 1913 the building is a free-standing, two-storey building of late Victorian residential design. The building has a simple rectangular plan form with a long central corridor on each floor. External materials consisted of Richmond Main red face brick with some detailing in the form of window arches and sills. The main roof is slate and the timber-framed verandah is a bull-nosed, corrugated, galvanised iron roof. The ground floor consists of offices for the various mine officials and the upper floor had a laboratory, kitchen and 3 bedrooms along with a large lecture room, there is also a large strong room for records storage under the ground floor.

Passenger rail platform

Simple concrete retaining wall and earth filled platform.

Cooling tower dam

Set into the ground with a brick perimeter wall and sloped wall concrete lining below ground. The dam had a capacity of 11,819,830 L (2,600,000 imp gal) and was supplied via a pipeline from a dam adjacent to Richmond Vale Junction and Wallis Creek.

Southern cooling towers

Eastern cooling towers

Freestanding steel framed structures with lower members encased in concrete and supported on concrete foundation piers. A concrete-lined pool is at the base of the towers. The walls are timber lined with the lower section lining in the form of timber louvres. A series of timber racks and slats are constructed inside the towers for the lower third of the height.

Under manager's office

Small, freestanding single-storey structure of rectangular plan and simple pitched roof. External walls are in Richmond Main red face bricks. There are no internal fittings and fixtures remaining from its original use.

Main shaft building

Built over the main No.2 shaft with the headframe passing through it, the main shaft building is a twin gabled, two-storey concrete construction with arched openings at ground level and arched windows. Internal and external walls are made of mass concrete with some steel reinforcement. Architectural details include pilasters, gables and arched windows. A metal stairway leads to the first floor which is primarily timber planks on steel. The roof is of light angle steel trusses with timber purlins and corrugated iron sheeting.

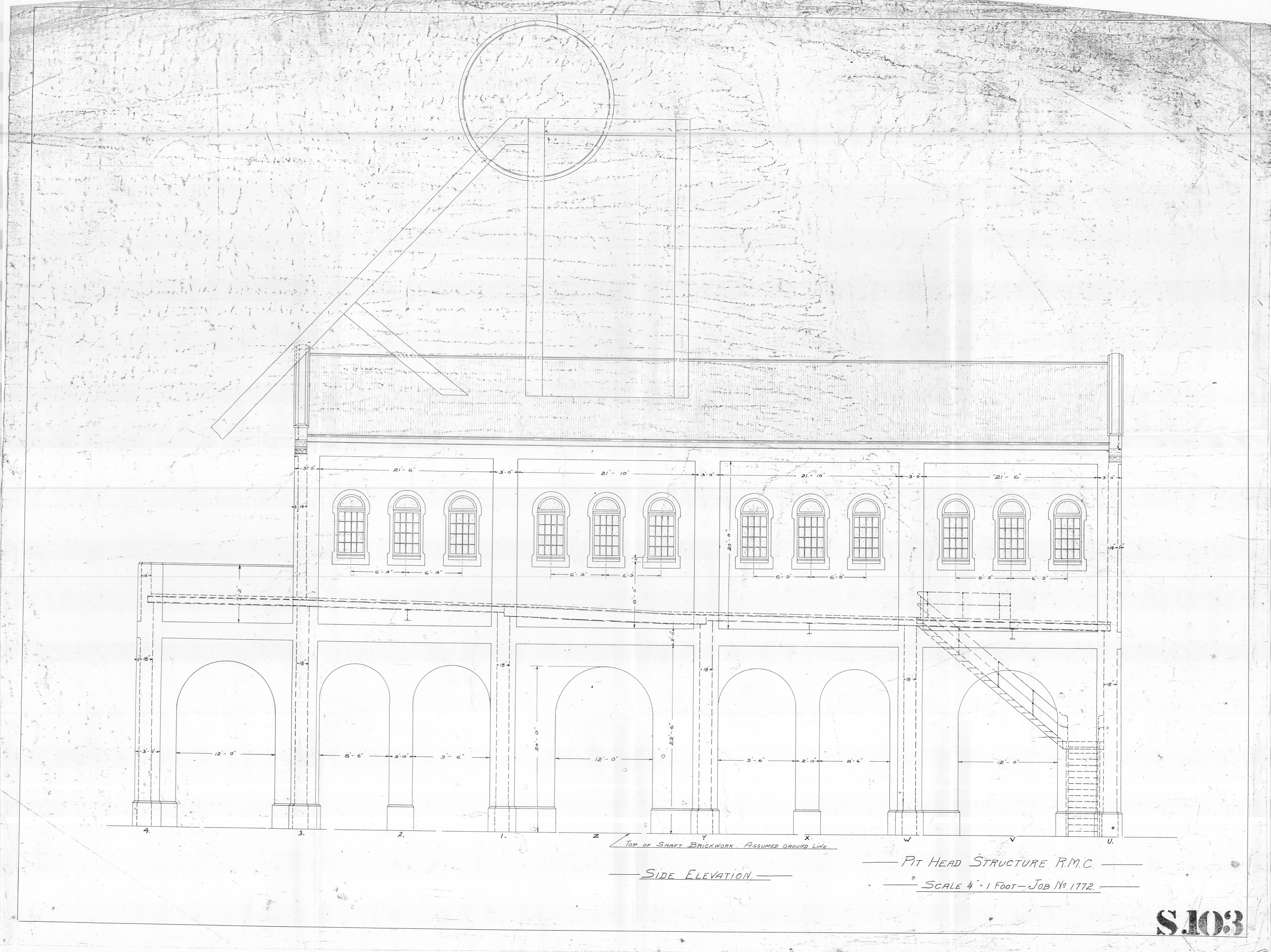
Elevation of the No.2 shaft pit top building at Richmond main Colliery

Both the No.2 shaft headframe and cages were ordered from Markham & Co of Chesterfield, England in 1910. The headframe was 27 m (90 ft) high to the top landing and was fitted with two 5 m (18 ft)diameter pulleys.

The main shaft building was unusual for the period as the walls were built from concrete, as most other mines of the period were constructed from timber, it was also unusual as the pit top building was separate from the screens. The banking level in the building had two levels of skip lines, to allow the full and empty skips to enter and leave the double deck cages. A raised level constructed above the main floor accessed the cages’ upper deck. Construction of the pithead building and the adjoining screens commenced in mid to late 1913.

The headframe, cages, skip lines and associated structures were sold for scrap after the colliery closed in 1967. In 1986-87 the building was reroofed which included placing an additional roof truss over the hole where the headframe passed through the roof of the building, no other restoration work has been carried out on the building.

Screens and bins area

Pillars of reinforced concrete

Power Station

Built to house the electric winding set for the main No.2 shaft along with the generators sets and electrical switchgear, the building is a truncated T-shaped plan, with two storeys and with steel trussed roof. This building set the trend for the architectural elements of later buildings with the use of faced brick with expressed plinth and pilasters, arched windows, gable ends with bulls eye windows and general detailing. A gable end porch extension extends to the west with a double stairway. It is tiled with ceramic, imported tiles. Unlike the other buildings at the colliery the bricks for the power station were obtained externally and were purchased from the National Brickworks Company Limited at Thornleigh. The building is fitted with a 20 tonnes (20 long tons) manually powered overhead crane built by Craven Brothers that runs the full length of the building.

The power station building was partially restored during 1987–88, which involved replacing the roof sheeting and repainting both internally and externally. Internal access to the building is currently not allowed due to the presence of unsealed asbestos insulation on the steam piping.

Willans & Robinson 1000kW turbines

The original Nos.1 & 2 turbines were ordered in 1910 and were installed during 1912-13 period. No.1 turbine entered service during July 1913, No.2 turbine entered service in late 1913. The turbines were made by Willans & Robinson of Rugby, England in 1911. The alternator portion of both generators was made by Siemens Brothers. After the arrival in 1927 of the Fraser & Chalmers 6000 kW set, No.1 turbine was moved to the Southern end of the powerhouse and was renumbered No.4 turbine. By the late 1930s, both turbines were used only on a standby basis. During the 1940s No.2 turbine was put up for sale as scrap. Despite the turbine and alternator portions being scrapped the condenser portion is still in place in the powerhouse basement. By the mid-1950s No.4 turbine was placed out of service and scrapped.

Fraser & Chalmers 3000kW Turbine (No.3 turbine)

This turbine was ordered in 1921 to accommodate the increase in demand for electricity with the planned opening of Duckenfield No.2 (Stockrington) Colliery at Stockrington, which was connected by a power transmission line to Richmond Main. The 3000 kW Fraser & Chalmers Ltd turbine (order No.51033), 3-phase Wilton Alternator (serial No. 38569) and the Worthington Simpson condensing plant was shipped to Australia on the ‘S.S. Boorara’ and arrived at Richmond Main in November 1922 at a total cost of £18,343. This turbine set stayed in use until the closure of the power station in 1976 and is still in place.

Fraser & Chalmers 6000kW Turbine (2nd No.1 turbine)

This turbine was ordered in 1926 to accommodate the increase in demand for electricity with the planned duplication and increased production at Richmond Main. The 6000 kW Fraser & Chalmers turbine (order No.53504), 3-phase Wilton Alternator (serial No.44620) and the condensing plant arrived at Richmond Main in July 1927 at a total cost of £13529. The condenser arrived on the ‘S.S. Minmi’ and the turbine and alternator arrived on the ‘Port Auckland’. This turbine set stayed in use until the closure of the power station in 1976 and is still in place.

Fraser & Chalmers / Siemens Electric winder

Ordered in 1910 the winder was installed during the 1911 to 1912 period but did not see use until 1913 when the first turbine was commissioned. The mechanical side of the winder was built by Fraser & Chalmers Ltd at their works at Erith, whereas the electrical components including the motor were built by Siemens Brothers, Dynamo Works Ltd. The winding set consisted of a 4 m (14 ft) diameter x wide drum powered by an 800 Volt DC electric motor. The winding engine was cut up for scrap after the colliery closed in 1967.

Siemens Brothers Motor Generator Set

Ordered in 1910 as part of the winding engine, the motor generator set was built by Siemens Brothers, Dynamo Works Ltd. The set was installed during the 1911 to 1912 period but did not see use until 1913 when the first turbine was commissioned. The purpose of the set was to generate D.C. power for the winding engine using a 3300 Volt AC motor driving a 720 kW 800V DC generator. By 1951 the set was in need of a major overhaul so the Metropolitan Vickers motor generator set was installed as a standby set. The Siemens set was taken out of use when the colliery closed in 1967 and disposed of.

Metropolitan Vickers Motor Generator Set

Purchased in 1926 as part of the 1130Hp Metropolitan Vickers winding engine, which was intended to be installed in the No.3 shaft fan and winding building. As this winding engine was never installed, when the Siemens converter set needed repairs in 1951, the motor generator set was installed in the power station on the site of No.2 turbine. The Metropolitan Vickers set was taken out of use when the colliery closed in 1967 and disposed of.

Water Tube Boiler House

Built to house the three John Thompson water tube boilers on the site of the original bank of seven Lanchasire boilers. The building is a steel framed, corrugated asbestos sheeted structure with basement adjacent to, and northeast of, the turbine room. The internal spaces are filled with the furnace, boiler equipment and controls, ladders, platforms and walkways. There is a 24 m (80 ft) high riveted steel construction steel chimney to the north of the boiler house.

Coal for the boilers was unloaded from the company's coal wagons in a rail track hopper built in front of the boiler house; the coal was then transported by a bucket conveyor to the coal bunkers above the stoking floor. The coal mined at Richmond Main burnt too fiercely for the water tube boiler chain grate stokers so coal from the less volatile Borehole Seam coal was rail hauled to the boiler house. In 1949 to help in the burning of low-quality coal the boilers were modified by the addition of forced draught fans and ducting. In 1955 with the coal preparation plant at Hexham commissioned, work commenced to enable the boilers to burn the waste middlings coal from the preparation plant. Part of this work entailed the construction of a second track hopper for unloading coal from wagons. An extension of the conveyor to the new rail hopper also served a bin constructed to enable the loading of coal from trucks or ‘from grass’; this was the facility in use when the boiler house closed in 1976.

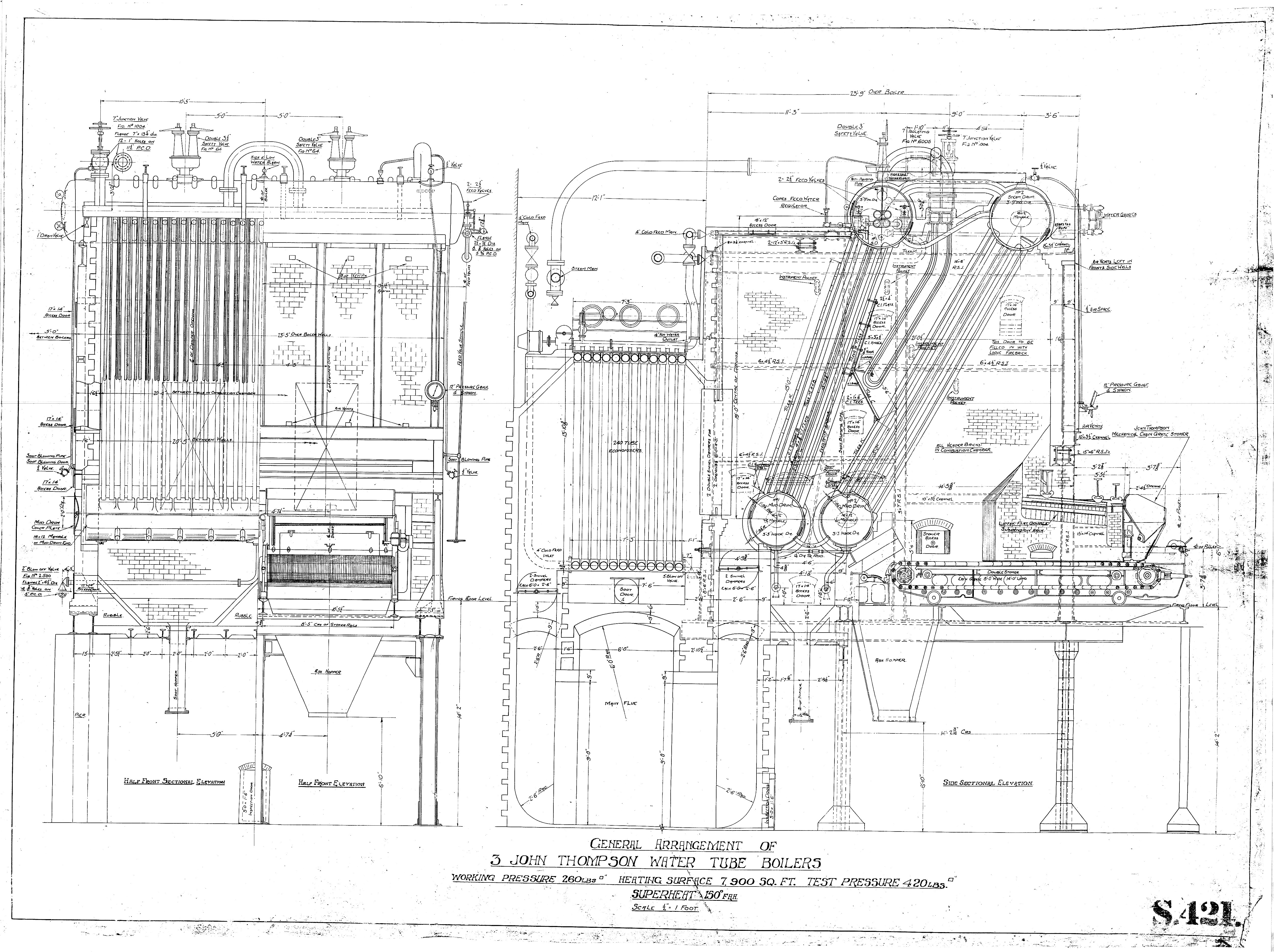
Arrangement of the John Thompson water tube boilers installed at Richmond Main Colliery

John Thompson Water tube boilers

Ordered in 1926 to provide high-pressure steam for the new 6000 kW turbine, the boiler drums, tubes, stoker parts and structure arrived in 1927 at a total cost of £17913. The boilers arrived on the ‘S.S. Minmi’ & ‘S.S. Themistodes’. The foundations for the boilers and coal handling plant were erected during August 1928 and construction of the first boiler commenced the next month. By December 1929 both Nos.1 & 2 boilers were complete but construction of No.3 boiler was slow, with the miners’ lockout and downturn of trade delaying the completion of No.3 boiler until July 1930. The 3 boilers stayed in use until the closure of the power station in 1976.

There is an additional group of buildings to the southeast of the turbine room, previously the location of the southern bank of original boilers. These buildings have spaced columns and a later east wall with loading dock and canopy and workshop accommodation.

Loco shed and store

The loco shed is a single-storey Richmond main red face brick building with gable end walls joined to the similarly sized and styled store building by an infill section. The loco shed has two large arched hinged doors in each end gabled wall. The store has sliding doors in its north and eastern elevations. Both have steel trussed roofs with the loco shed having a slate-covered roof and the store having a corrugated iron roof.

The loco shed was constructed during 1918 and was used to house the locomotive/s based at the colliery. With the construction of the direct passenger line in 1922 and the arrival of the ex-War Department R.O.D. 2-8-0 locomotives from 1926 onwards, it was decided to enlarge the loco sheds at Pelaw Main Colliery and close the loco shed at Richmond Main. The loco shed was then turned into a store with the service pits being filled and the infill portion built between the loco shed and store, this infill had a mezzanine floor, which was extended over the closest loco shed road. The remaining road was left clear as this road also ran into the end of the power station. The loco shed was also used in later years to house the colliery truck. The loco shed and adjoining store now form the main maintenance area for the Richmond Vale Railway Museum.

Workshops

These are a long, low single-storey building constructed of brick. The roof is pitched with several cross gables indicating staging and gabled end walls. The original centre section has large member timber trusses.

Transformer building

A two-storey building with face brick detailing in Richmond main red and a gabled roof. The switch tower dates from 1921 to 1922 when the transmission line to Stockrington & Minmi was constructed. A similar tower to the one at Richmond Main was constructed at the Stockrington end at Duckenfield No.2 Colliery.

The adjoining substation was enlarged during the Second World War when the transmission line from Richmond Main to Stockrington was connected to the New South Wales Department of Railways transmission grid. It was further enlarged when the Stockrington line was extended to supply the coal preparation plant at Hexham in the early 1950s. Modifications and additions were made in 1960 to allow for interconnection with the former Caledonian Collieries power station at Cockle Creek.

After the power station closed in 1976, the substation remained in use as the power supply to Stockrington Colliery, and the coal preparation plant still came via Richmond Main switchyard. When Stockrington Colliery closed in 1988 and the decision to demolish the preparation plant in 1989 the transmission line was placed out of service, the line, switchgear and transformers being scrapped soon after.

Fan and Compressor Building

Original portion is on the northern end and is constructed with Richmond main red face brick with typical detailing but not the gabled end walls. The roof is made of timber trusses and slate tiles. The southern, later section is tiled with imported ceramic tiles and has an annex on the southern elevation.

No.1 Shaft Winding Engine House

A free standing single volume building constructed of red face bricks with typical detailing, including gabled end walls.

No.3 Shaft Winding Engine & Ventilation Fan Building and shaft

A tall, freestanding concrete-encased steel-framed structure with red face brick infill panels and glazed walls on the western elevation. The building was built to house a ventilation fan and electric winding engine for the new No.3 shaft. The electric winding engine and fan motor floor is at first floor level, with the fan at ground level at the mouth of the fan drift. The ventilation drift connection to the shaft is located partly underground in the form of a gentle sweeping curve. The building is built adjoining the No.3 shaft for the mine. The drift entry is open and the walls are brick lined. A steel tube column supports the tunnel roof.

The steel work was constructed in England by A.J. Main & Co. Ltd of Glasgow and was shipped to Australia on the ‘S.S. Vedic’ & ‘S.S Runic’ and arrived in March 1928 at a cost of £1670. A 30 tonnes (30 long tons) hand driven Craven Brothers overhead travelling crane was purchased for £450 and fitted to the building. With the electric winding engine never being fully installed the bulk of the building was used for the undercover storage of large pieces of machinery.

Grain silos

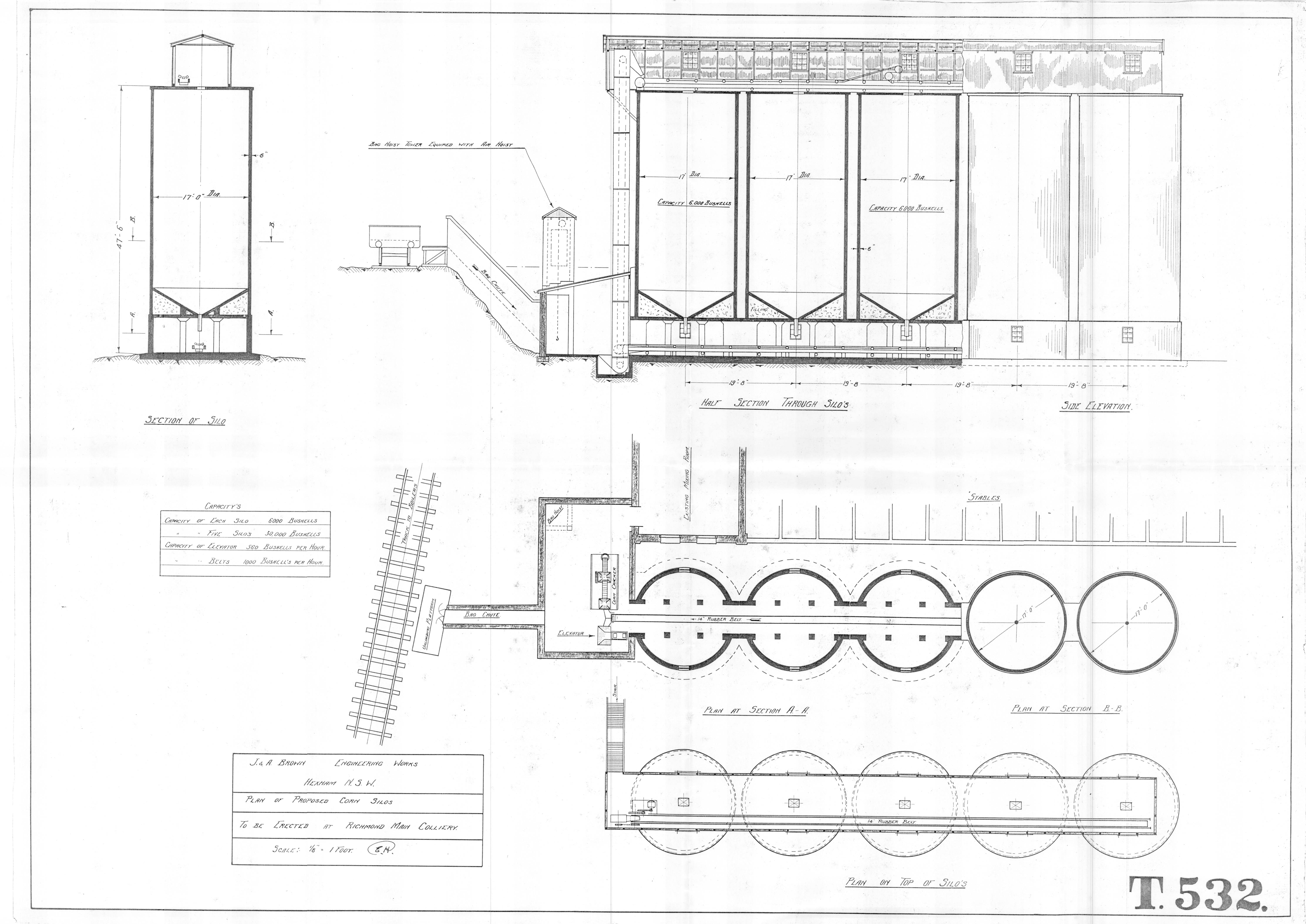
Arrangement of the concrete grain silos for feed for the mine pit horses at Richmond Main Colliery

Built adjacent to the mine's surface horse stables, the grain silos are 5 reinforced concrete construction circular structures 4 m (14 ft) in diameter by 14 m (46 ft 3 in) high. The silos were to have a total capacity of 1,091,062 litres (30,000 imp bsh) and were to be filled by a combination of bucket and rubber conveyors. Due to several factors the silos were never finished past the construction of the bare concrete silos.

The site was reported as being in fair condition as of the time of the heritage listing, with archaeological potential at the carriage shed site.

== Heritage listing ==
The cultural significance of the former Richmond Main Colliery in its surviving condition relies more on the complex as an expression of a particular era of region, industrial and social history than on the integrity of the remaining empty structures. That era is the rapid and short-lived heyday of the establishment and development of the South Maitland coalfields in the first half of the twentieth century and of the mining communities and transportation networks that evolved to support that industry. While Richmond Main can claim some degree of cultural significance in its own right, primarily through its links to John Brown and his intentions for it, its real strength lies in its ability to become that expression to present and future generations.

Richmond Main Colliery was listed on the New South Wales State Heritage Register on 2 April 1999 having satisfied the following criteria.

The place is important in demonstrating the course, or pattern, of cultural or natural history in New South Wales.

Richmond Main gains its historical significance from its strong associations with John Brown, its importance as a strong component within the South Maitland collieries and the resulting development of a large regional community in the coalfields area. Much of the surviving fabric pertains to the use of the buildings in the early decades of the twentieth century, maintaining the continuity of these links. While some evidence has been destroyed, sufficient remains to form a valuable interpretive backdrop to the strong documentary evidence of the period.

The place is important in demonstrating aesthetic characteristics and/or a high degree of creative or technical achievement in New South Wales.

Richmond Main can claim some degree of aesthetic value from the scale of the buildings in the complex, the relative unity of materials and the subtle use of continuing architectural themes through various building types. However, with the exception of the scale and the cooling towers, the complex is not a unique example of industrial architecture of the period or region. The intention of John Brown to make Richmond Main his flagship and the showpiece of the industry can be seen to give the complex, a degree of representation for those other collieries, even in its partially ruined state.

The place has strong or special association with a particular community or cultural group in New South Wales for social, cultural or spiritual reasons.

The development of the South Maitland coal fields led to the establishment of an entire community based on the townships of Cessnock and Kurri Kurri. Within the space of a decade, the region was transformed from a rural backwater to a vital element in the state's resources of steaming coal. The collieries in the area have thus become an emerging focus of community consciousness as to its source of being. By itself, Richmond Main is perhaps no more important than any other single colliery within this ethos, but the continuation of a representative link back to this era is of considerable importance to those communities.

The place has potential to yield information that will contribute to an understanding of the cultural or natural history of New South Wales.

Without the usual constraints of existing investment or partially outdated facilities, John Brown was able to create Richmond Main as a corporate showpiece displaying "state of the art" coal mining technology and electric power generation. Old technology replaced new technology several times, with mechanisation occurring in the 1950s. Despite this, there is still sufficient physical evidence to contribute to the understanding and interpretation of extensive documentary sources. This will enable Richmond Main to become a valuable resource for regional and industrial history.
