= Newcastle Steelworks =

Steel mill in Australia

Coordinates: 32°53′42″S 151°45′36″E

Blast furnaces and gas cleaning unit, Steelworks, Newcastle, 1949

The Newcastle Steelworks was a steel mill built by BHP in Newcastle, New South Wales. Construction commenced in January 1913, with operations commencing in March 1915. It was officially opened on 2 June 1915 by Governor-General Ronald Munro Ferguson. Newcastle was selected due to its proximity to the Hunter Valley coalfields with the iron ore shipped from Whyalla.

The 150 ha (370 acres) steelworks had a 45 km (28 mi) rail network. Initially operated by steam locomotives, 32 and 37 class diesel locomotives were later introduced.

Having become one of the largest employers in Australia with a workforce that peaked at 11,000 in 1981, it closed on 30 September 1999. Demolition commenced in 2000.

In 2022, the Department of Planning & Environment called for expressions of interest to redevelop the site.
