= BHP Whyalla DH class =

Class of diesel locomotives

Type and origin
- Power type: Diesel-hydraulic
- Builder: Walkers Limited, Maryborough
- Build date: 1962–1968
- Total produced: 6
Specifications
- Configuration
  - UIC: Bo-Bo
- Gauge: 1,067 mm (3 ft 6 in); 1,435 mm (4 ft 8 1/2 in) standard gauge
- Fuel type: Diesel
- Prime mover: Cummins NRTO.6BI
Performance figures
- Tractive effort: 427 kW (573 hp)
Career
- Operators: BHP
- Number in class: 6
- Numbers: DH1-DH6
- Locale: Whyalla Steelworks
- First run: April 1962
- Disposition: 6 scrapped

The BHP Whyalla DH class were a class of diesel locomotives built by Walkers Limited, Maryborough for the BHP's Whyalla Steelworks between 1962 and 1968.

== History ==
In 1962 three locomotives were purchased by BHP for use at its new Whyalla Steelworks. Initially used on construction trains until the facility opened in 1964. A further two were delivered in 1965. All were built for use on the standard gauge. In March 1968 a sixth was purchased for use on the narrow-gauge line between Hummock Hill and the blast furnaces.

All six members of this class have been scrapped with DH1 being the last to be scrapped, having been transferred to Australian Southern Railroad when it took over OneSteel's rail operations in 2000.

Number	Serial number	Into Service	Withdrawn	Scrapped
DH1	573	Apr 1962	–	2004
DH2	574	Apr 1962	–	Feb 1994
DH3	575	May 1962	–	Oct 1997
DH4	579	Aug 1965	–	Sep 1997
DH5	580	Sep 1965	–	Sep 1997
DH6	582	Mar 1968	–	Sep 1997
