= Chullora Railway Workshops =

Defunct workshops in New South Wales

Chullora Railway Workshops were a major workshops for the repair and heavy maintenance of locomotives and rolling stock for the New South Wales Government Railways.

It was built on site at Chullora over 485 acres adjoining the main Sydney marshalling yards at Enfield. The decision to build a new workshop was made because of the inadequacy of the existing facilities at Eveleigh Railway Workshops and the decision to electrify the Sydney metropolitan network.

The master plan envisaged it would cover all aspects of railway operation with separate facilities for a locomotive workshop, carriage workshop, wagon repair depot, electric repair shop, signal engineers branch, general railway store, water supply and existing lines branch.

== History ==
In the late 1940s and 1950s, it built 600/700, 620/720 and DEB set railcars.

The site began to wind down in the 1960s as operations were decentralised and the rail network contracted. The south western part of the site was sold for redevelopment with Fairfax Media and News Limited both moving their Sydney printing factories to the site. In October 1984, the Sydney Freight Terminal opened on the site to replace Darling Harbour. Despite $61 million being invested in the facility between 1980 and 1985, in March 1994, the Elcar electric carriage maintenance facility was closed with responsibility for maintaining the CityRail fleet taken over by A Goninan & Co at a new facility in Auburn.

UGL Rail have a facility on the site which has in recent years has assembled UGL Rail C44aci locomotives.

In November 2018, plans were announced to move Transport Heritage NSW's heritage collection items from the Eveleigh Railway Workshops and Broadmeadow Locomotive Depot to a new location in the Chullora Railway Workshops to be known as the Chullora Heritage Hub.
