= Kitchener, New South Wales =

Kitchener
- Suburb
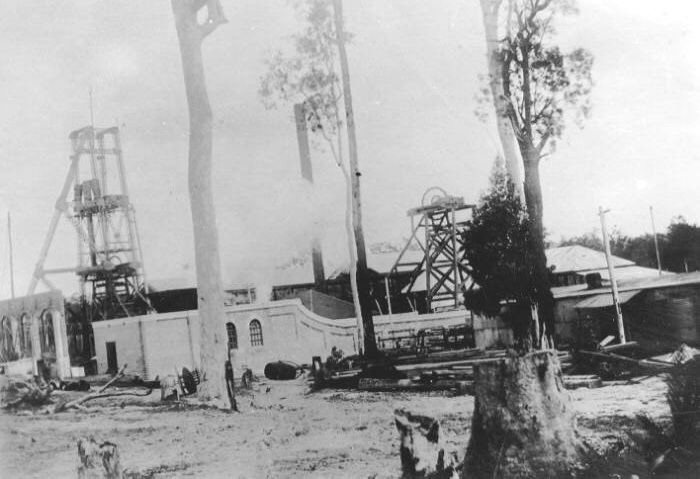
- Photograph of the Aberdare Central Colliery, Kitchener
- Country: Australia
- State: New South Wales
- City: City of Cessnock
- LGA: City of Cessnock

Government
  - State electorate: Cessnock
  - Federal division: Hunter

Population
  - Total: 530 (2011 census)
- Postcode: 2325
Suburbs around Kitchener
	Cessnock	Kearsley
Greta	Kitchener	Abernethy
Pelton	Quorrobolong

Kitchener is a small town in the City of Cessnock, in the Hunter Region in the state of New South Wales, Australia. Kitchener is located 5 kilometres south of the town of Cessnock, NSW and is adjacent to Werakata National Park and the Aberdare State Forest.

The town is named after Lord Kitchener, British secretary for War from July 1914.

== Mining history ==
Kitchener was the location of the Aberdare Central Colliery which was developed by Caledonian Collieries Ltd during World War I. The historic mine site has been preserved as a Heritage Park (including the poppet head structure). A number of the dwellings where originally occupied by mine management.

In 1914, the mine employed 93 people; four years later it employed 287.

In July 1943, a large fire caused the mine to close for 12 months.

The mine was closed in November 1961. The coal holding lease is still retained by Coal & Allied.

In 2009, a Chinese owned mining company, Austar, was granted approval to construct a surface infrastructure site just south of Kitchener. This facility was built to service the company's Longwall Top Coal Caving mining of the Greta Coal Seam (in the mine previously known as the Southland Coal Mine) south of Kitchener.

== See also ==
- South Maitland coalfields
- Coal in Australia
