= Bellbird Heights, New South Wales =

Locality in New South Wales, Australia

Bellbird Heights Cessnock, New South Wales
- Coordinates: 32°50′54″S 151°19′50″E
- Population: 788 (2016 census)
  - Density: 1,960.7/km^{2} (5,078/sq mi)
- Established: 1923
- Gazetted: 3 September 1971 (suburb); 23 October 2015 (locality)
- Postcode(s): 2325
- Area: 0.4019 km^{2} (0.2 sq mi)
- Time zone: AEST (UTC+10)
  - Summer (DST): AEDT (UTC+11)
- Location: 4.3 km (3 mi) SE of Cessnock; 52.4 km (33 mi) WNW of Newcastle; 155 km (96 mi) S of Sydney
- LGA(s): Cessnock
- Region: Hunter
- County: Northumberland
- Parish: Cessnock
- State electorate(s): Cessnock
- Federal division(s): Hunter
Mean max temp	Mean min temp	Annual rainfall
24.2 °C; 76 °F	10.5 °C; 51 °F	743.3 mm 29.3 in
Suburbs around Bellbird Heights:
Bellbird	Cessnock	Cessnock
Bellbird	Bellbird Heights	Bellbird
Bellbird	Bellbird	Bellbird

Bellbird Heights is a locality in the City of Cessnock in the Hunter Region of New South Wales, Australia. It was first subdivided in 1923 as Crossing Estate, and was gazetted as Bellbird Heights in 1971. In 2016 the population was 788, median age was 40 and 87.5% were born in Australia.
