= Quorrobolong, New South Wales =

Quorrobolong
- Suburb
- Coordinates: 32°54′54″S 151°22′04″E
- Country: Australia
- State: New South Wales
- Region: Hunter
- City: Cessnock
- LGA: Cessnock City Council
- Location: 11 km (6.8 mi) SE of Cessnock

Government
  - State electorate: Cessnock
  - Federal division: Hunter

Population
  - Total: 512 (2016 census)
- Time zone: UTC+10 (AEST)
  - Summer (DST): UTC+11 (AEDT)
- Postcode: 2325
- County: Northumberland
- Parish: Quorrobolong
Suburbs around Quorrobolong
| Kitchener | Abernethy | Erlington |
| Ellalong | Quorrobolong | Mulbring |
| Congewai | Watagans National Park | Brunkerville |

Quorrobolong is a small locality in the Hunter Region of New South Wales, Australia. It is located 11 km (7 mi) southeast of the town of Cessnock and is adjacent to Watagans National Park.

Quorrobolong has a variety of accommodation to cater for tourists visiting the Hunter Valley, including farmstays and health retreats. It is also the home of the not‐for‐profit 'Heal For Life' organisation which provides healing programs for survivors of childhood trauma and abuse.

== Indigenous history and name ==
The name Quorrobolong is based on the aboriginal word which means "a low line of hills". Initially, the name was spelled "Quarrybylong" and was officially changed to Quorrobolong in 1975.

The Central Lowlands of the Hunter Valley is the country of the Wonnarua people. A recent survey indicates that the Quorrobolong area contains a ceremonial ground and two burial sites.

== European settlement and mining ==
The history of European settlement of the area is part of the broader exploration and settlement story of Hunter Region with townships first established at Wollombi and then the broader Cessnock area. Land in the Quorrobolong area was first settled as part of pastoral estates granted in the late 1820s and early 1830s, then was progressively subdivided for further pastoral use. The wider Quorrobolong area was originally controlled under several large land grants of over 1000 acres including those owned by Jacob Josephson, George Thomas Palmer and Edward Charles Close.

The area was established as the Parish of Quarrybylong, as part of the County of Northumberland.

From the latter half of the eighteenth century a farming community was established to the south of Sandy Creek Road, sometimes referred to as the Sandy Creek Community. In 1864 Margaret Daunt constructed a school to the south of Sandy Creek Road to educate the local children. Quorrobolong Public School opened in October 1865. She taught at the school until 1882 when age and poor health forced her to retire. The school closed in December 1965.

Quorrobolong has a New South Wales Rural Fire Service Station 800 Meters From The Former Quorrobolong School, The Rural Fire Brigade is 100% Volunteered and receives little Government Funding. The Brigade Has 2 Fire Appliances (Category 1 and 7 Appliances) which respond around the Cessnock, New South Wales LGA (Local Government Area). The Brigade has regular meetings and receives donations from Kitchener Local Pub. The Brigade is the 1st response for emergencies around the area. The Brigade Often Responds to Fire Emergencies, Motor Vehicle Accidents, Search And Rescue, Medical Response, Rescues and many other Emergencies.

The Station works Closely with New South Wales Police Force Cessnock Local Area Command, Newcastle District Police Rescue Squad and Other Emergency Services mainly with Search and Rescue Operations and Motor Vehicle Accidents.

Mining infrastructure in the Quorrobolong area – for the Pelton, Ellalong, Bellbird and Southland Collieries – dates to the 1910s, resulting in the rapid intensification of use of the local region.

Today, the Austar underground coal mine, operated by Chinese company Yancoal, has some underground operations beneath the Quorrobolong area.

== Ecology ==
Quorrobolong is home to the Quorrobolong Scribbly Gum Woodland which is considered an Endangered Ecological Community under the NSW Threatened Species Conservation Act (1995).

== See also ==
- List of schools in the Hunter and Central Coast
