= Cessnock railway station =

Former railway station in New South Wales, Australia

Cessnock
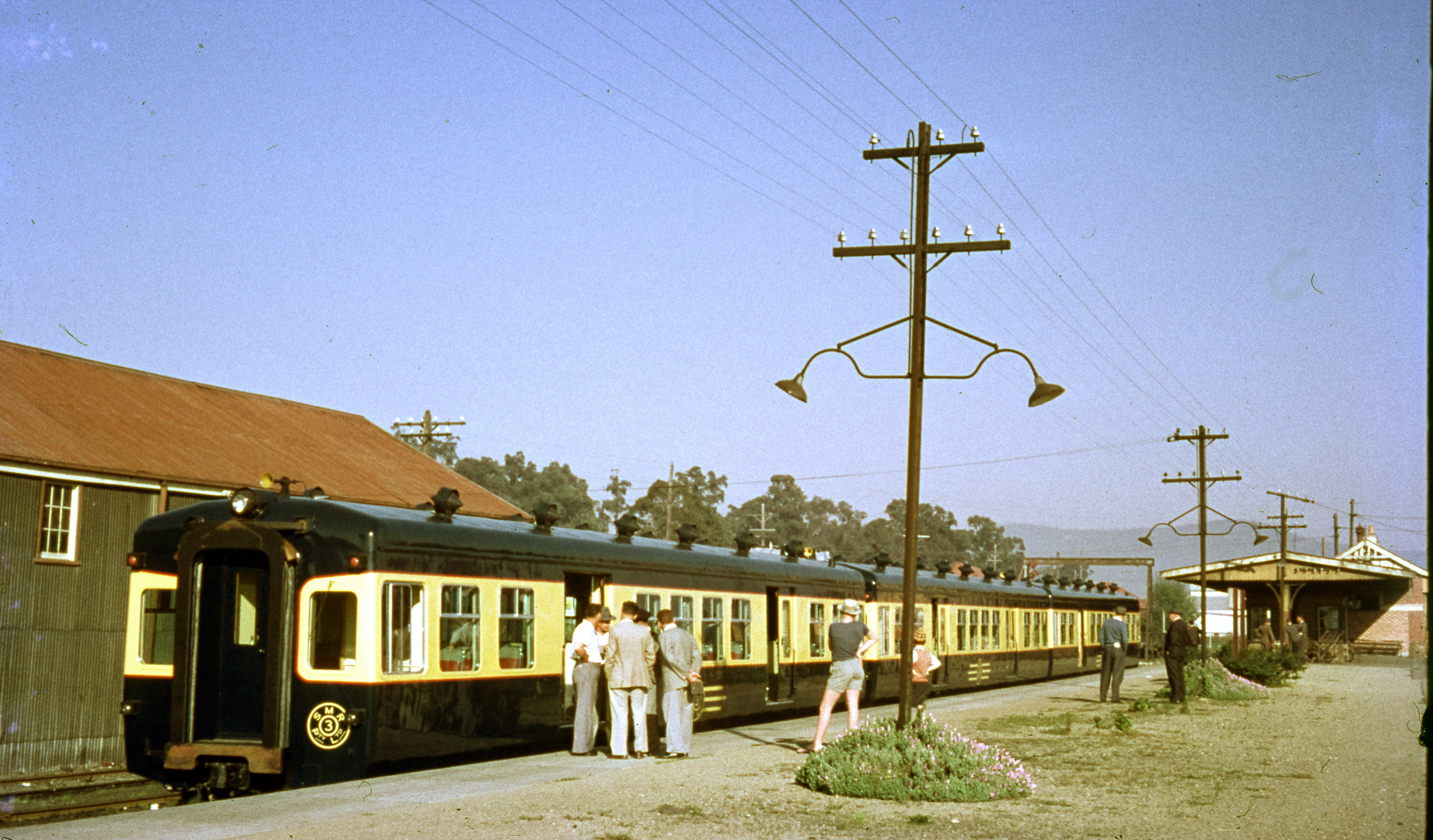
- An SMR railcar at the station in September 1961

General information
- Location: Railway Street, Cessnock; Australia
- Coordinates: 32°50′30″S 151°21′21″E
- Owner: South Maitland Railway
- Operator: South Maitland Railway, NSWGR
- Line: Cessnock Branch
- Distance: 218.140 km (135.546 mi) from Central
- Platforms: 3 (1 side, 2 bay)
- Tracks: 7

Construction
- Structure type: Ground

Other information
- Status: Demolished

History
- Opened: 16 February 1904
- Closed: 1975

Services
Preceding station	Former services	Following station
Terminus	Cessnock Line	Caledonia towards Maitland
Location

Cessnock railway station was a railway station located on the South Maitland Railway (SMR), serving the city of Cessnock, New South Wales, Australia. During its existence, it was the main station that served the city.

== History ==
Cessnock opened on 16 February 1904, as the passenger terminus of the SMR.

The SMR had already begun operating both freight and passenger services by 1902, but extended the railway line to the Bellbird Colliery by 1904, including the opening of a short deviation to Cessnock, serving passengers from that year.

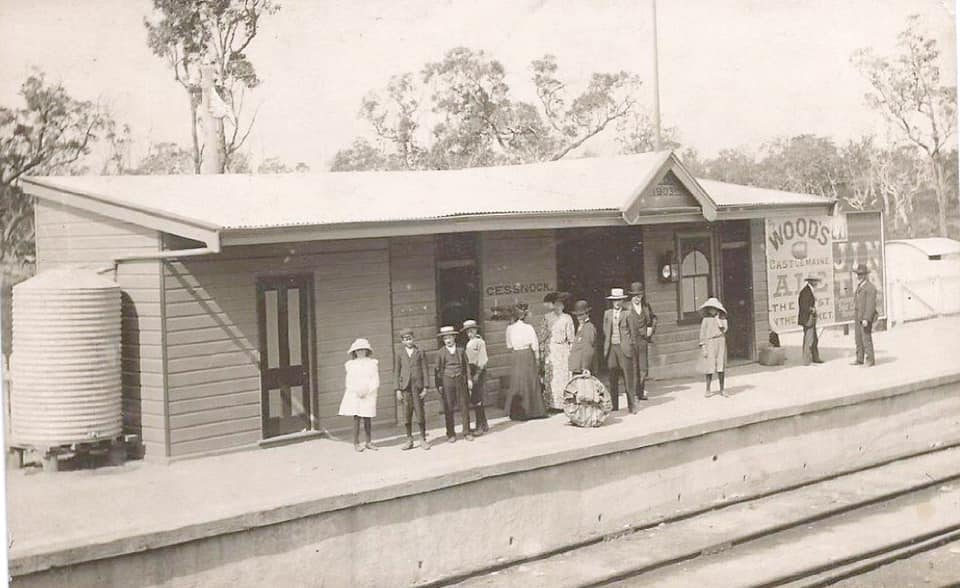
The original station building at Cessnock, as it appeared in 1905

The first passenger services were run using second-hand carriages from the New South Wales Government Railways (NSWGR). Passenger services to Cessnock briefly ceased between 1929 and 1930 due to industrial pursuits, ultimately resulting in the destruction of the majority of SMR carriages. After this, services were handed to the Department of Railways New South Wales.

In 1940, a direct service between Cessnock and Sydney was introduced.

In 1945, the station was upgraded to include new plants outside the eastern entrance, and a taxi rank between this and the Cessnock Hotel. Fencing was considered for the western side of the station.

By the 1960s, motor cars proved popular competition for rail services and this led to the ceasing of SMR passenger services from Maitland to Cessnock in 1967. All services were operated by the NSWGR until passenger services ceased completely in August 1972. The station itself was officially closed and demolished in November 1975. The area on which the station stood is now an industrial site, and no part of the station remains.

== Description ==
At opening, Cessnock railway station consisted of a single platform with a wooden station building. However, by the 1930s two bay platforms had been added behind the 190m main platform. Additionally, three sidings, a goods platform and loading bank had been built opposite the passenger platforms. Although the station possessed a water column and coal stage, no turntable was ever constructed.

By the time of closure in the 1970s, only the single main platform was still in regular use.

== Proposed reopening ==
Due to the increase in population growth since the beginning of the 21st century, multiple groups have campaigned for the reopening of the line between Maitland and Cessnock.

In 2024, a joint proposal by PalazziRail and Lycopodium Infrastructure, 'The Case for the Train to Cessnock' was brought to the NSW government. This proposal would see passenger services reinstated along the line between Maitland and Cessnock by 2028, with the reopening of Kurri Kurri, Weston, Abermain and Neath stations as well as new stations at Gillieston Heights and Kearsley. Under this proposal, the railway line would extend past Cessnock to a new terminus station at Bellbird. The second stage of this proposal would include additional stations provided at Loxford, Aberdare and West Cessnock.

== See also ==
- Newcastle railway station, New South Wales - another now-closed main terminus and destination for trains from Cessnock
