= Abernethy, New South Wales =

Abernethy
- Suburb
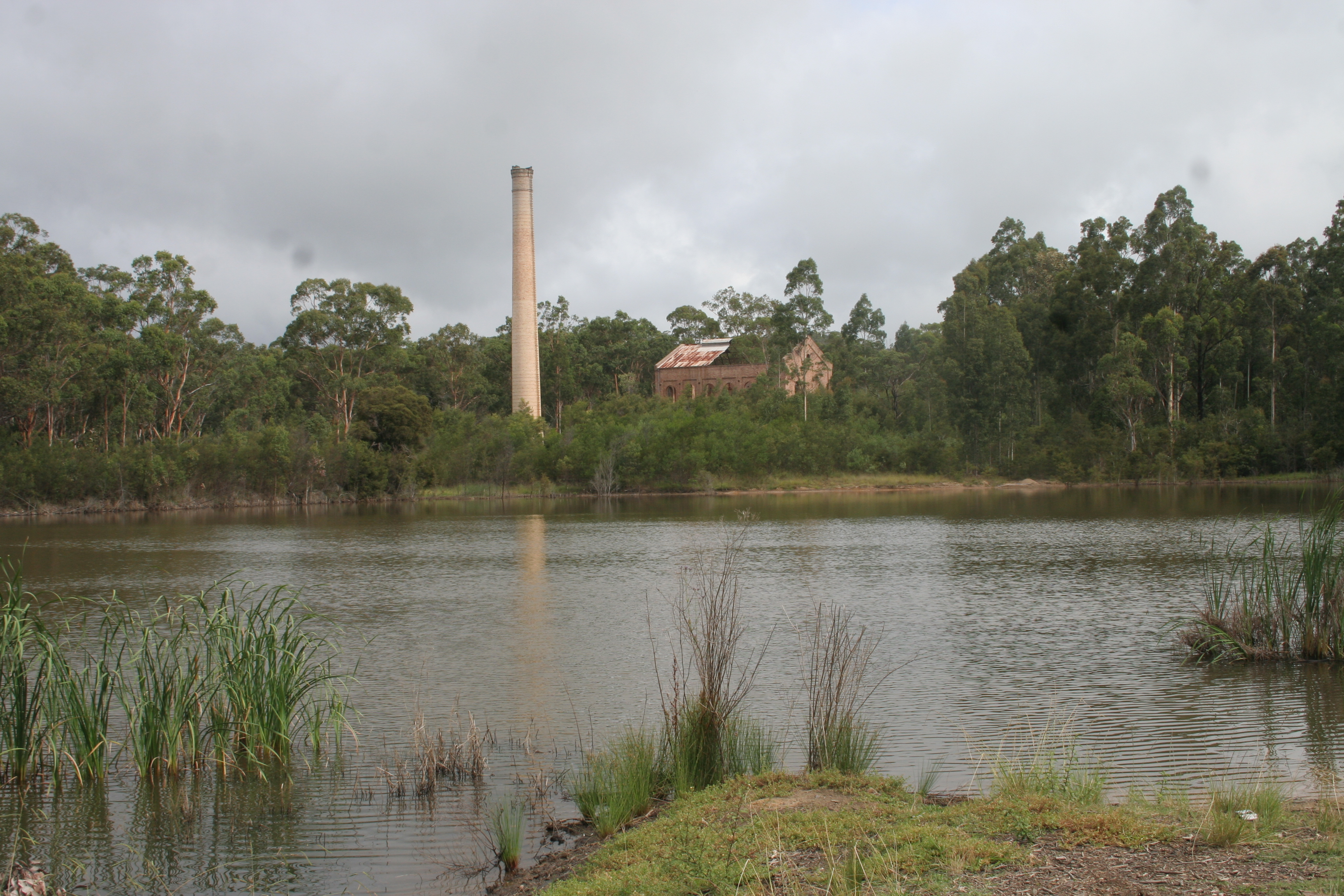
- Remains of old Aberdare South Colliery

- Coordinates: 32°52′12″S 151°24′00″E
- Country: Australia
- State: New South Wales
- Region: Hunter
- City: City of Cessnock
- LGA: Cessnock
- Location: 7.6 km (4.7 mi) SE of Cessnock; 49.6 km (30.8 mi) WNW of Newcastle; 148 km (92 mi) N of Sydney
- Established: 1913

Government
  - State electorate: Cessnock
  - Federal division: Hunter

Area
  - Total: 8.4025 km^{2} (3.2442 sq mi)
- Elevation: 90 m (300 ft)

Population
  - Total: 317 (SAL 2021)
- Time zone: UTC+10 (AEST)
  - Summer (DST): UTC+11 (AEDT)
- Postcode: 2325
- County: Northumberland
- Parish: Cessnock
- Gazetted: 14 July 1915 (village); 5 September 1975 (village); 23 October 2015 (locality)
- Mean max temp: 24.2 °C (75.6 °F)
- Mean min temp: 10.5 °C (50.9 °F)
- Annual rainfall: 743.3 mm (29.26 in)
Suburbs around Abernethy
Kitchener	Kearsley	Elrington
Kitchener	Abernethy	Elrington
Quorrobolong	Quorrobolong	Quorrobolong

Abernethy is a small town in the City of Cessnock, in the Hunter Region in the state of New South Wales, Australia. Abernethy is located 8 kilometres south-east of the town of Cessnock, NSW and is adjacent to Werakata National Park and the Aberdare State Forest. The town was founded near a coal mine and some of the historic buildings remain (including the Abernethy Hotel which now operates as a guest house). In 2021, 317 lived there with the median age being 37 and 89.0% being born in Australia.

== Mining history ==
The town's origins lie in the establishment of the Aberdare South Colliery which was operated by Caledonian Collieries Limited. The town was laid out in 1906 and the mine commenced operation in 1913. The mine closed in 1927.

Some structures of the old Colliery are still present on the site including the winder house, the chimney stack and dam.

== Population ==
In 2021 the population was 317 and the median age was 37. 89.0% were born in Australia and 2.8% were born in England. 40.7% were not religious, 24.0% were Anglican, 14.2% were Catholic, 5.4% did not state their religion, and 3.8% were Baptist. 93.4% only spoke English at home.

== Bushfire in 2002 ==
On 19 October 2002, a large bushfire in Abernethy claimed the life of Sydney businessman Ronald Gillett, destroyed six homes and damaged many more.

A 2004 inquest found that the fire was deliberately lit "by persons unknown". A subsequent inquest reached a similar conclusion in 2008. In February 2010, Police announced a $100,000 reward for information that leads to the arrest of the arsonist.

== See also ==
- South Maitland coalfields
