= Congewai, New South Wales =

Congewai Cessnock, New South Wales
- Coordinates: 32°57′55″S 151°16′08″E
- Population: 206 (2021 census)
- Gazetted: 23 October 2015 (locality)
- Postcode(s): 2325
- Elevation: 78–531 m (256–1,742 ft)
- Time zone: AEST (UTC+10)
  - Summer (DST): AEST (UTC+11)
- Location: 13.3 km (8 mi) SW of Cessnock; 47.2 km (29 mi) W of Newcastle; 104.5 km (65 mi) N of Sydney
- LGA(s): Cesnock
- Region: Hunter
- State electorate(s): Cessnock
- Federal division(s): Hunter
Suburbs around Congewai:
Millfield	Ellalong	Quorrobolong
Corrabare	Congewai	Olney
Corrabare	Watagan	Olney

Congewai is a settlement in New South Wales, Australia.

== Education ==
There is one co-ed government primary school called Congewai Public School on 605 Congewai Road.

== Population ==
In 2021 the population was 206 with a median age of 56. 83.5% of the residents were born in Australia, 5.3% England, 2.4% New Zealand. Their religious affiliations were recorded as 45.1% No Religion, 20.4% Anglican, 12.1% Catholic, 9.2% Not stated and 1.9% Christian nfd (not further described).
