= Hunter Valley Important Bird Area =

Important Bird Area in New South Wales, Australia

Coordinates: 32°51′39″S 151°19′47″E

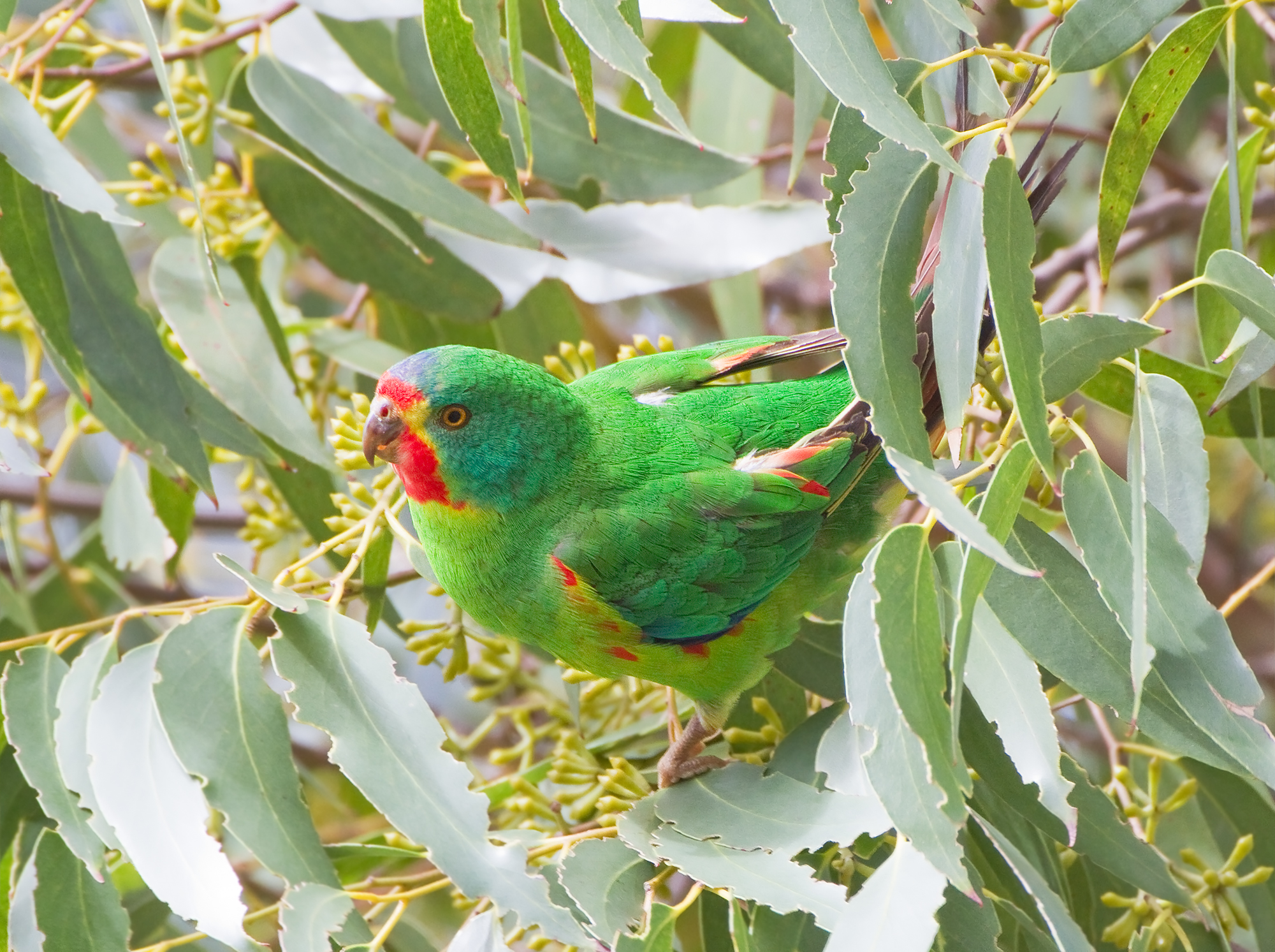
The IBA is an important area for swift parrots

The Hunter Valley Important Bird Area is a 560 km^{2} tract of land around Cessnock in central-eastern New South Wales, Australia.

== Description ==
The site has been identified by BirdLife International as an Important Bird Area (IBA) because it regularly supports significant numbers of the endangered regent honeyeater and swift parrot. The near threatened diamond firetail is also present. The IBA is defined by remnant patches of eucalypt-woodland and forest used by the birds in a largely anthropogenic landscape. It includes Aberdare and Pelton state forests, Broke Common, Singleton Army Base, Pokolbin, Quorrobolong, Abermain and Tomalpin, as well as various patches of bushland, including land owned by mining companies. The IBA contains Werakata National Park and part of Watagans National Park. Extensive areas are used for coal mining, vineyards, residential and industrial development, and military training.
