= Whittingham, New South Wales =

Whittingham New South Wales
- Coordinates: 32°36′30″S 151°12′00″E
- Population: 364 (2016 census)
- Postcode(s): 2330
- Location: 4 km (2 mi) SE of Singleton
- LGA(s): Singleton Council
- State electorate(s): Upper Hunter
- Federal division(s): Hunter

Whittingham is a locality in the Singleton Council region of New South Wales, Australia. It had a population of 364 as of the 2016 census.

Whittingham Post Office opened on 16 June 1879 and closed on 31 July 1948.

Whittingham Public School opened in August 1881 and closed in December 1983.

Whittingham railway station opened on 6 September 1869 as Falkiner's Platform. It was renamed Whittingham in February 1877. It closed at an unknown date and has been demolished.

The Whittingham Anglican Cemetery is located on Cemetery Road and continues to be maintained by the Anglican Church.

The E.C. Throsby Pty Ltd abattoir is located at Whittingham.

== Heritage listings ==
Whittingham has a number of heritage-listed sites, including:

- Minimbah House
- Neotsfield Lane: Neotsfield
