= Mulbring, New South Wales =

Suburb of Cessnock City Council, New South Wales

Coordinates: 32°54′24″S 151°29′34″E

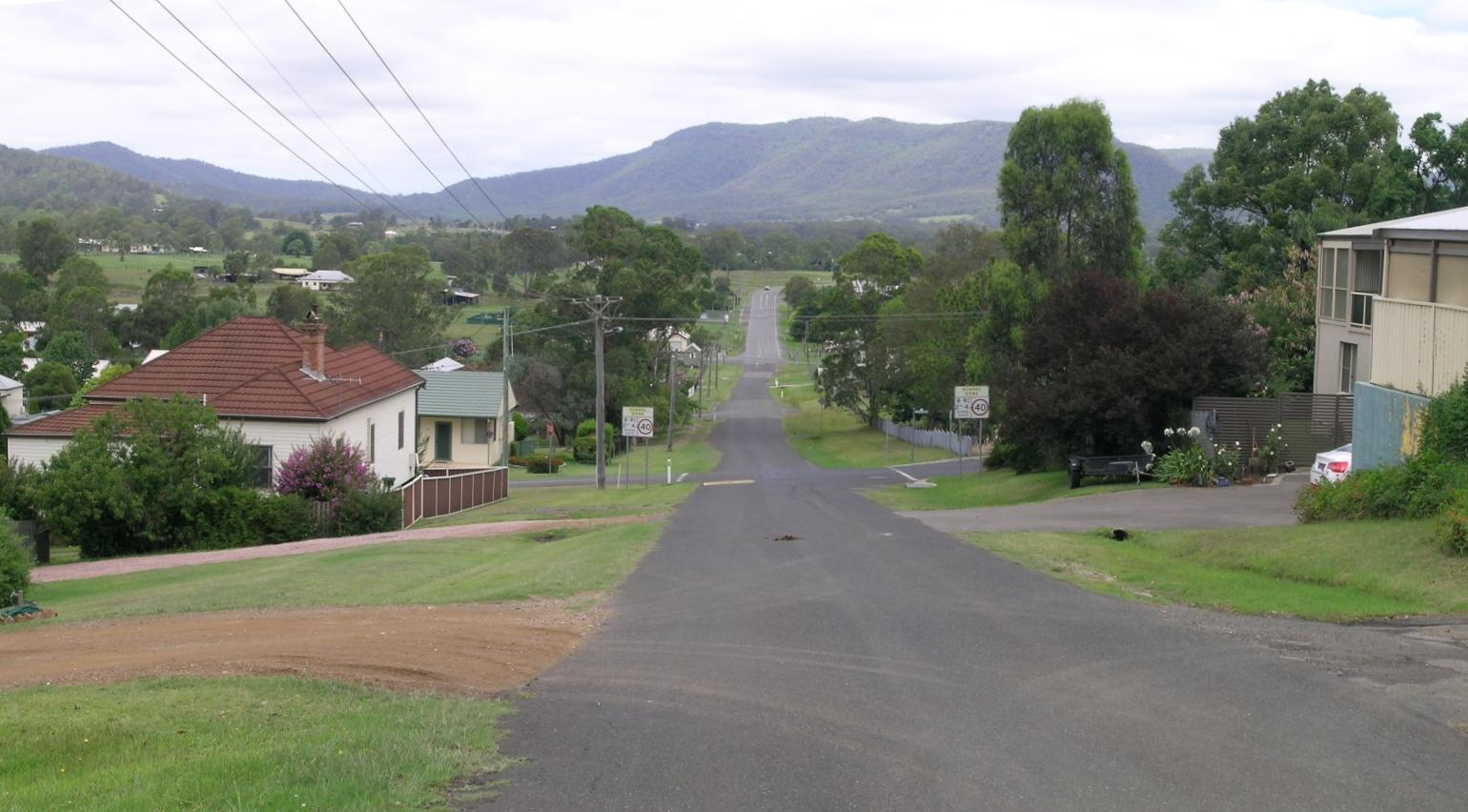
Mulbring, NSW

Mulbring is a village in the Hunter Region of New South Wales, Australia. At the 2016 census, Mulbring recorded a population of 597.

The village is situated about 10 kilometres south of Kurri Kurri and about 1 km north of the village of Mount Vincent. The nearest major town is Cessnock which is approximately 25 km north-west of Mulbring. Mulbring is in the City of Cessnock local government area (LGA) and Northumberland County at an elevation of 47 metres above sea level.

Mulbring was originally a stopping place for travellers going to and from Sydney to the Maitland and Newcastle area in the late 19th century.

Mulbring was serviced by a Post Office until 2017. The public school has 42 pupils enrolled as of 2018.

== See also ==
- Mount Sugarloaf (New South Wales)
