= Frank Rickwood =

Australian oil industry businessman

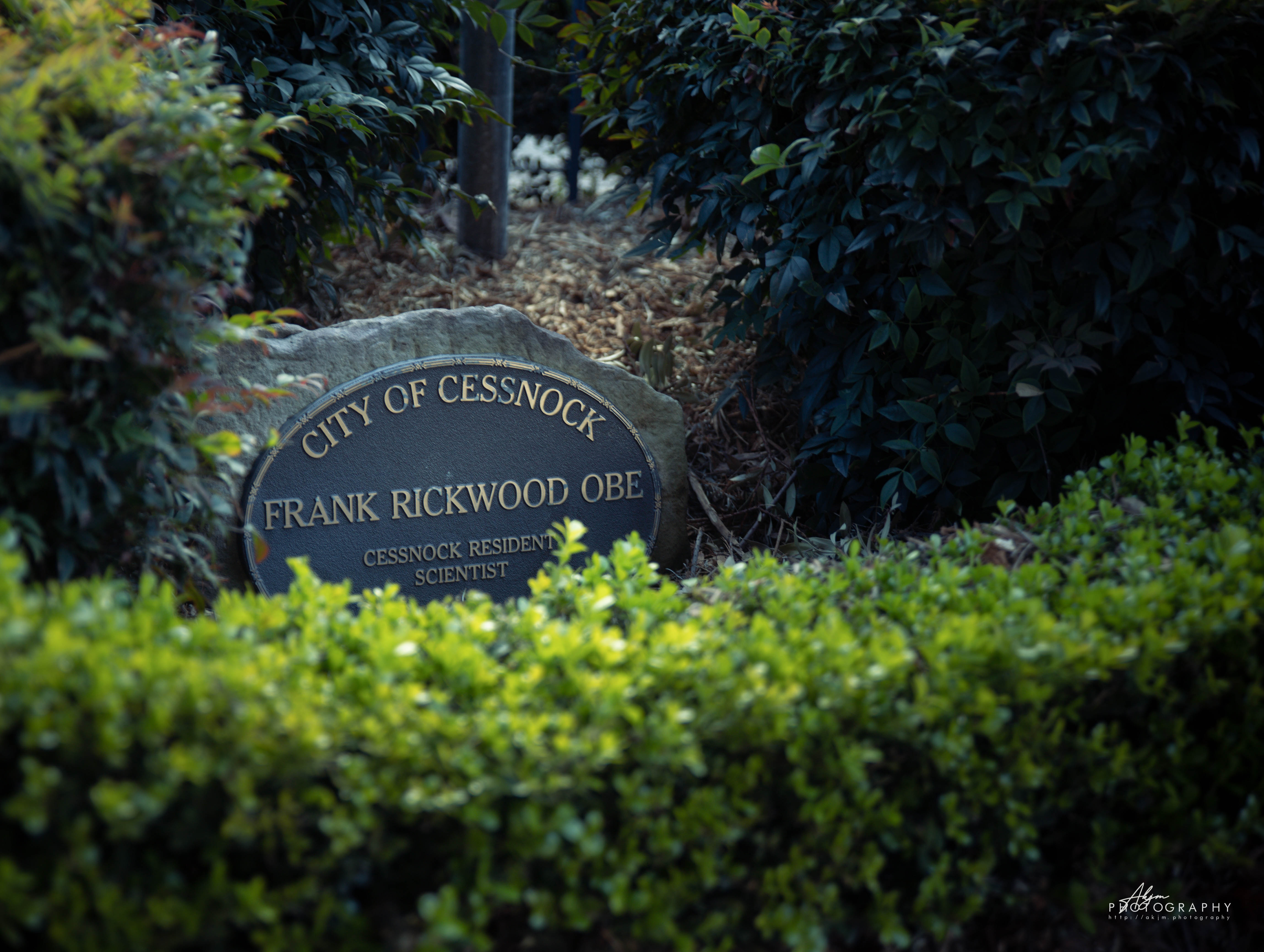
- Commemorative plaque, laid in honor of Frank Rickwood in Vincent Street, Cessnock, Australia
- Born: Frank Kenneth Rickwood; 1921; Cessnock, New South Wales, Australia
- Died: 19 July 2009 (aged 87–88); Barbados
- Education: Cessnock High School
- Alma mater: University of New England
- Occupations: Geologist, business executive
- Parent(s): George Rickwood; Elizabeth Rickwood

Frank Kenneth Rickwood OBE (1921–2009) was an Australian businessman in the oil industry. He worked for BP from 1956 to 1980, serving as the President of BP Alaska from 1969 to 1980. He later served as the Chairman of Oil Search, focusing on oilfields in Papua New Guinea.

== Early life ==
Frank Rickwood was born in 1921 in Cessnock, New South Wales, Australia. His father, George Rickwood, was an English immigrant to Australian who worked as the editor of the Cessnock Eagle and correspondent for the Daily Telegraph. His mother was Elizabeth.

Rickwood was educated in a convent in Nulkaba and the Cessnock High School. He graduated from University of New England in 1945.

== Career ==
Rickwood was a lecturer of geology at the University of Sydney. He also worked for Oil Search, making research trips to Papua New Guinea.

Rickwood worked for BP (formerly known as the Anglo-Persian Oil Company) from 1956 to 1980. He developed oilfields in Somalia, Central America and South America. As the President of BP Alaska from 1969 to 1980, he oversaw the expansion of the Prudhoe Bay Oil Field.

Rickwood served as the Chairman of Oil Search in the 1980s. In that capacity, he discovered the Kubutu Oil Field in Papua New Guinea.

Rickwood served on the Boards of Directors of Ampol, Pioneer International and Peko Oil. He authored The Kutubu discovery: Papua New Guinea, Its People, the Country and the Exploration and Discovery of Oil in 1992.

Rickwood was the 1993 recipient of the Haddon Forrester King Medal from the Australian Academy of Science. Additionally, he was made an Officer of the Order of the British Empire (OBE) by Queen Elizabeth II herself aboard the Britannia.

== Personal life ==
Rickwood was gay. He lived with his partner, Justin Rainey, until the latter died in the early 1990s. However, he was closeted in the workplace. When he was John Browne's boss in New York, both men were in the closet and neither knew that the other was gay.

Rickwood resided at Minimbah House, a historic mansion near Singleton, New South Wales. In the 1990s, he moved to the Colleton Great House, a plantation mansion in Saint Peter, Barbados. He was a significant art collector.

Rickwood was diagnosed with Parkinson's disease in 2004.

== Death ==
Rickwood died on 19 July 2009 in Barbados. His funeral took place at St Peter's Church in Speightstown, Barbados on 28 July 2009.
