= Werakata National Park =

National park in New South Wales, Australia

- IUCN category II (national park)
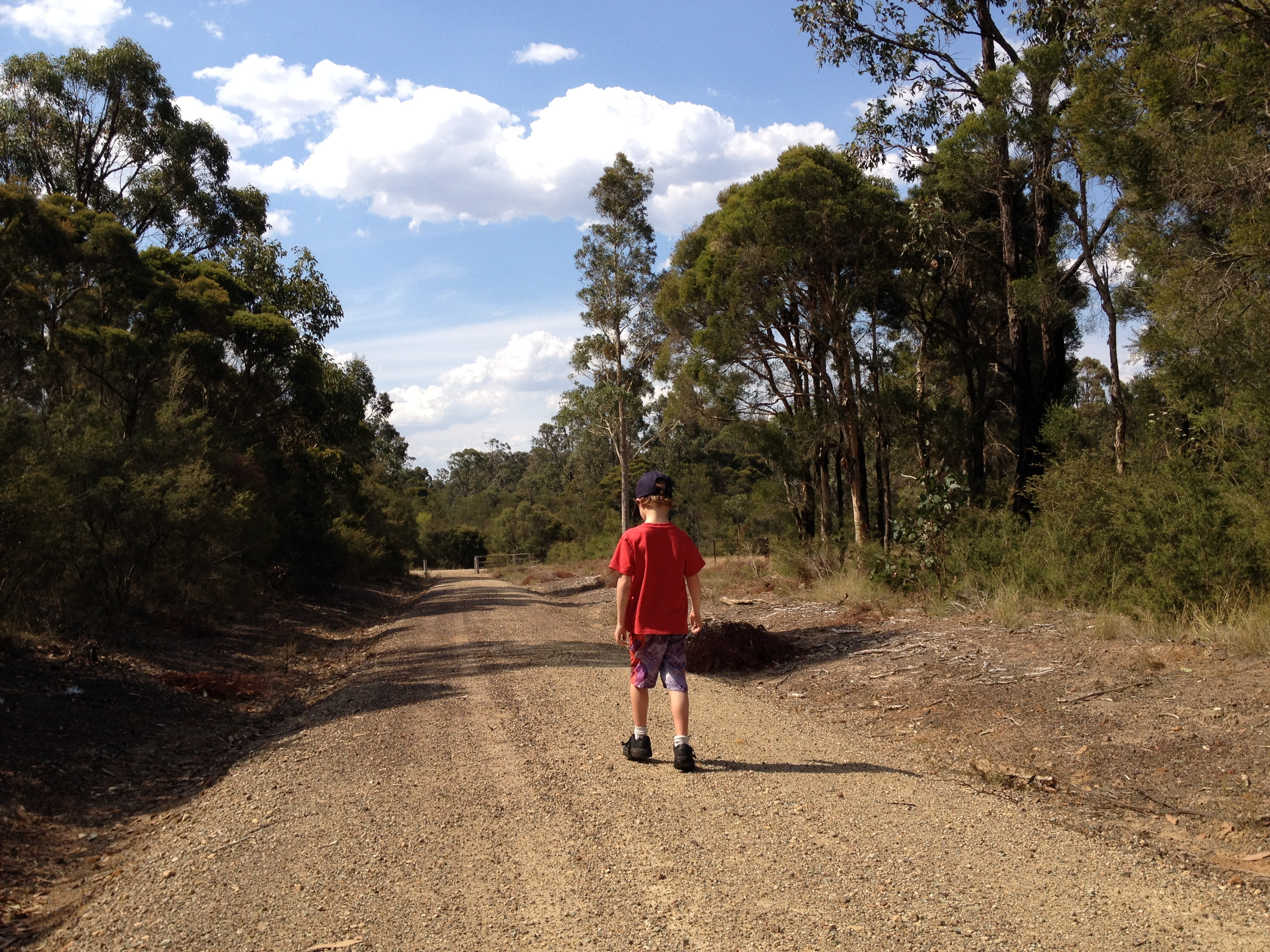

- Location within New South Wales
- Location: New South Wales
- Nearest city: Cessnock
- Coordinates: 32°47′4.3″S 151°23′16.8″E
- Area: 33.37 km^{2} (12.88 sq mi)
- Established: January 1999
- Governing body: NSW National Parks and Wildlife Service
- Website: Official website

The Werakata National Park is a protected national park in the Lower Hunter Region of New South Wales, in eastern Australia. The 3,337-hectare (8,250-acre) national park is located to the north, east and south of the town of Cessnock (the park is separated into three distinct but closely located sections: near Abermain, near Kearsley and near Kitchener/Abernethy).

The national park lies within the Hunter Valley Important Bird Area.

South of the national park is the separate Werakata State Conservation Area.

== History ==
Originally called Lower Hunter National Park, the Werakata National Park was created in January 1999 with land that had previously been part of the 1,130-hectare (2,800-acre) Cessnock State Forest (State Forest No. 874). On 1 January 2003, the park was expanded with 478 hectares (1,180 acres) from the former Cessnock State Forest and also the 531-hectare (1,310-acre) Aberdare State Forest (State Forest No. 981).

The Werakata State Conservation Area was created in 2007 with an area of 2,257 hectares (5,580 acres).

The Hunter region was inhabited by the Awabakal, Worimi, Wonnarua, Geawegal, Birrpai and Darkinjung Aboriginal tribes, although little is known about Aboriginal use of the area in the vicinity of the park. After European settlement in the 1800s, forestry commenced and sawmills were established in and near area the area of the park (most of the timber going to local mines for pit props). The Cessnock and Aberdare State Forests were declared in 1942 and 1963 respectively and logging continued until the forests were transferred to the NSW National Parks and Wildlife Service.

== Flora and fauna ==
When the park was first gazetted, the spotted gum-ironbark vegetation communities found on the park were identified as being poorly represented in the regional reserve system.

The park is home to several threatened species including:

- Squirrel glider
- Grey-headed flying fox
- Regent honeyeater
- Swift parrot

== Other features ==
- Astills Picnic Area
- Kurri Sand Swamp Woodland.
- Bushwalking (walking up to Tomalpin hill)
- Bicycle trails (leave from Astills picnic area, along Deadmans Trail and return to the picnic area via Gibsons Road).
- An old Forestry Hut (off Old Maitland Road).

== See also ==
- Protected areas of New South Wales
