= Mount Sugarloaf (New South Wales) =

Mountain in New South Wales, Australia

- Great Sugar Loaf
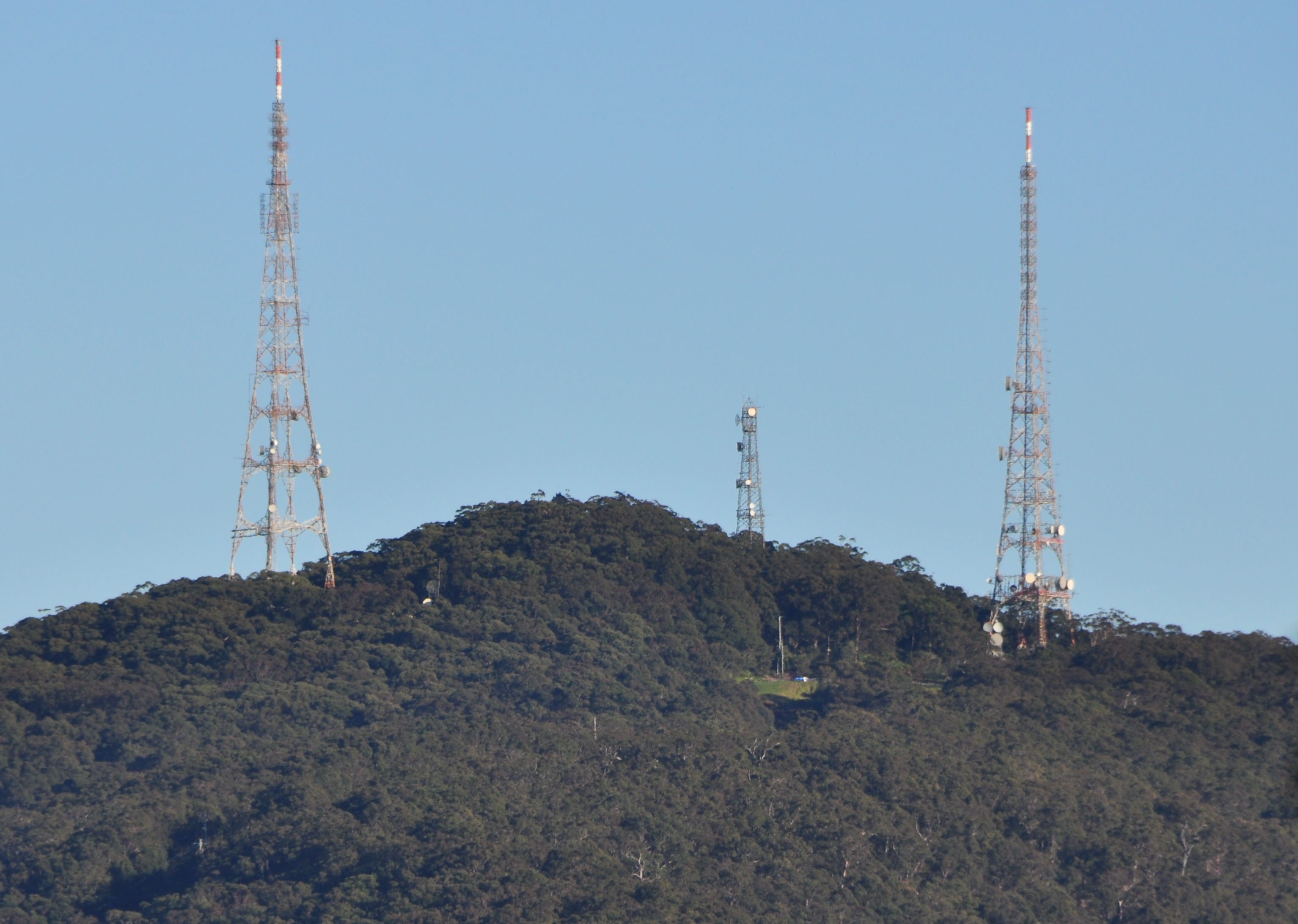
- Mount Sugarloaf viewed from West Wallsend

Highest point
- Elevation: 412 m (1,352 ft)
- Coordinates: 32°52′54″S 151°32′4″E

Naming
- Native name: Kapara (Awabakal)

Geography
- Location within New South Wales
- Location: Hunter Region, New South Wales, Australia
- Parent range: Sugarloaf Range
- Topo map(s): NEWCASTLE 9232, WALLSEND 92323S

Climbing
- Easiest route: Road to carpark at 370 m (1,214 ft), walking track to summit

Mount Sugarloaf (Awabakal: Kapara) also known as Great Sugar Loaf, is a mountain in the lower Hunter Region of New South Wales, Australia, standing at 412 metres (1,352 feet), it looks over the cities of Newcastle, Lake Macquarie, Cessnock, and Maitland. The summit of the mountain is in the Lake Macquarie suburb of West Wallsend and access to the summit is gained via this suburb. However, the mountain itself is also part of the city of Cessnock suburbs Mulbring and Richmond Vale. It is home to television transmitters that broadcast to the lower Hunter region. On 18 and 19 July 1965, the mountain received 10 centimetres (4 in) of snow. It also snowed on the summit in the winter of 1975.

== Television transmitters ==
The mountain has two broadcast transmission towers. Since the 1960s, their main function has been to transmit analogue television on VHF. In the 1990s, two UHF analogue stations began to transmit from there. Since 2003, they have also been transmitting digital television in the UHF band (all digital television in the lower Hunter is on UHF). The analogue television transmitters (VHF and UHF) were switched off in November 2012. One tower, built to transmit the original VHF analogue television services of NBN on VHF Channel 3, transmits Channel Nine and two government digital TV services. It is commonly referred to as the "NBN Tower". The second tower is transmitting the other two commercial digital (UHF) TV stations. The second tower is controlled by Broadcast Australia, being formerly run by the National Transmission Authority. There are many other radio antennae on these towers, including 105.3 NEWFM (Newcastle's original commercial FM broadcaster – launching in 1989) and those belonging to amateur radio repeater and beacon stations.

== Smaller tower ==
There is a third smaller tower that has many directional antennae, mainly used for telecommunications, but also for two-way radio for emergency services and other similar purposes. It has Telstra markings on much of the equipment and sheds.

== Aboriginal history ==
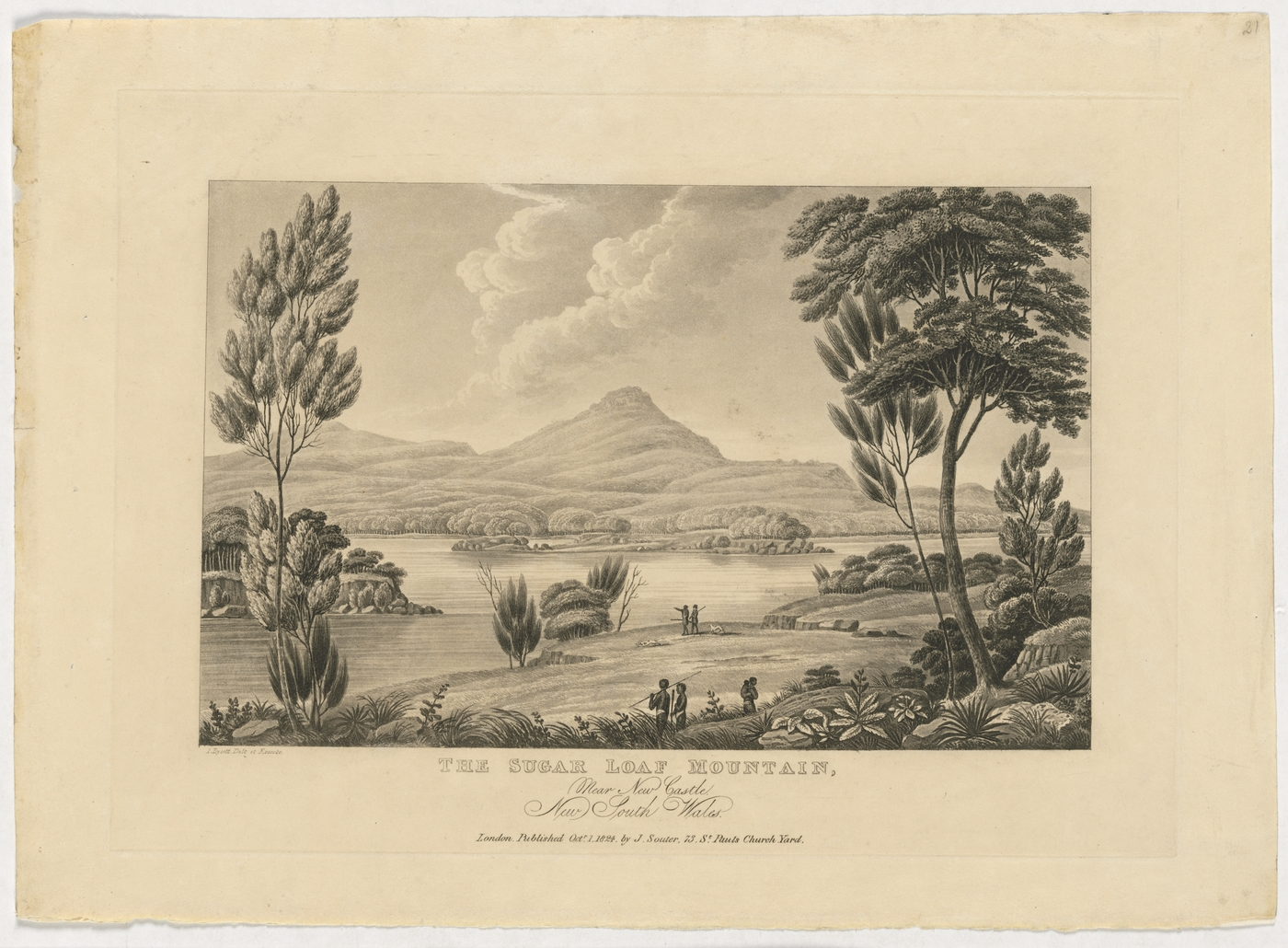
G.H. Hammersley – Australia Illustrated, ca. 1777–1855. Mitchell Library, State Library of New South Wales.

The Awabakal people called the mountain Warrawelong and it is a significant site for the Awabakal. It provides a vantage point to view all Awabakal lands and is an important teaching place. Sacred ceremonies are known to have taken place there. The shape of the mountain is said to look like a wedge-tailed eagle and is the setting for a cautionary tale concerning the fate of two children at the hands of a monster called Puttikin.

== Gallery ==
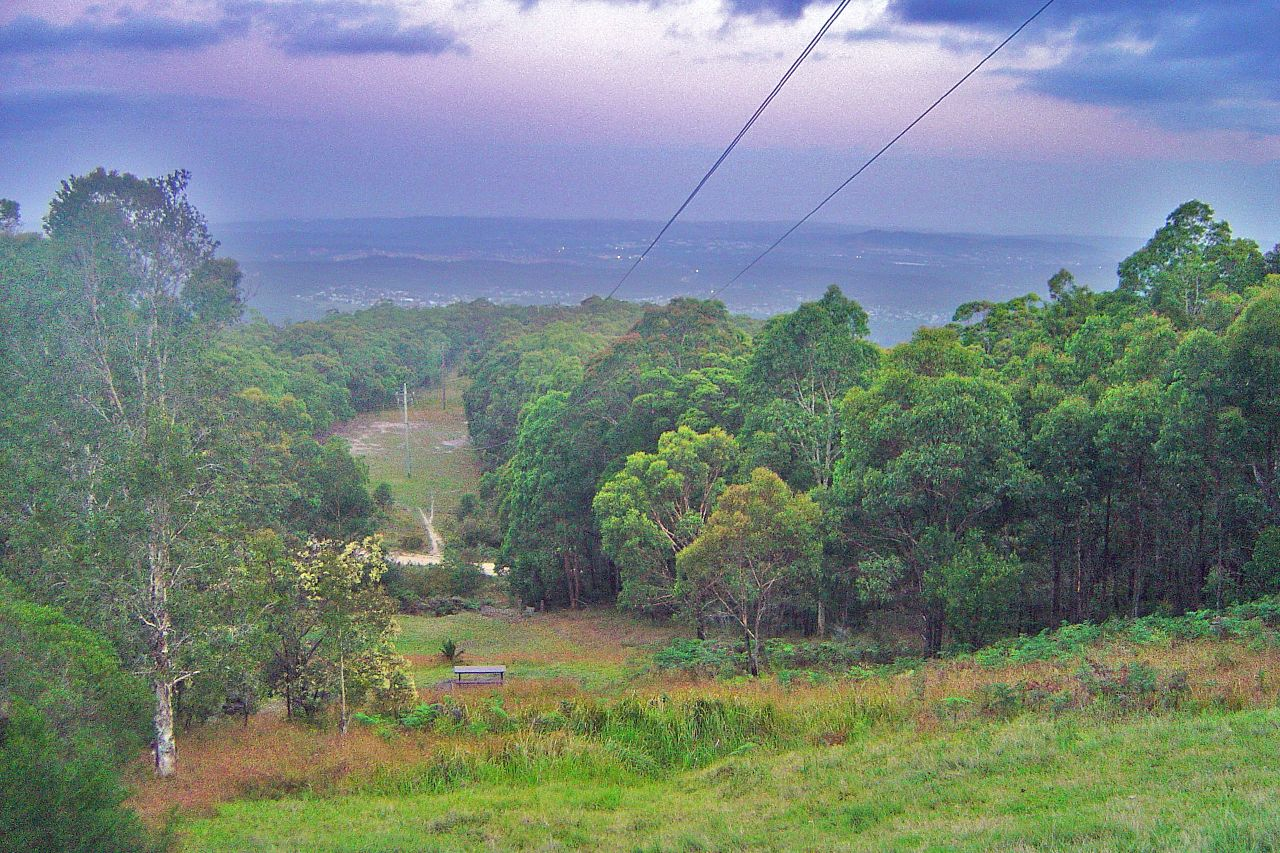
Looking toward Newcastle from the Mount Sugarloaf carpark

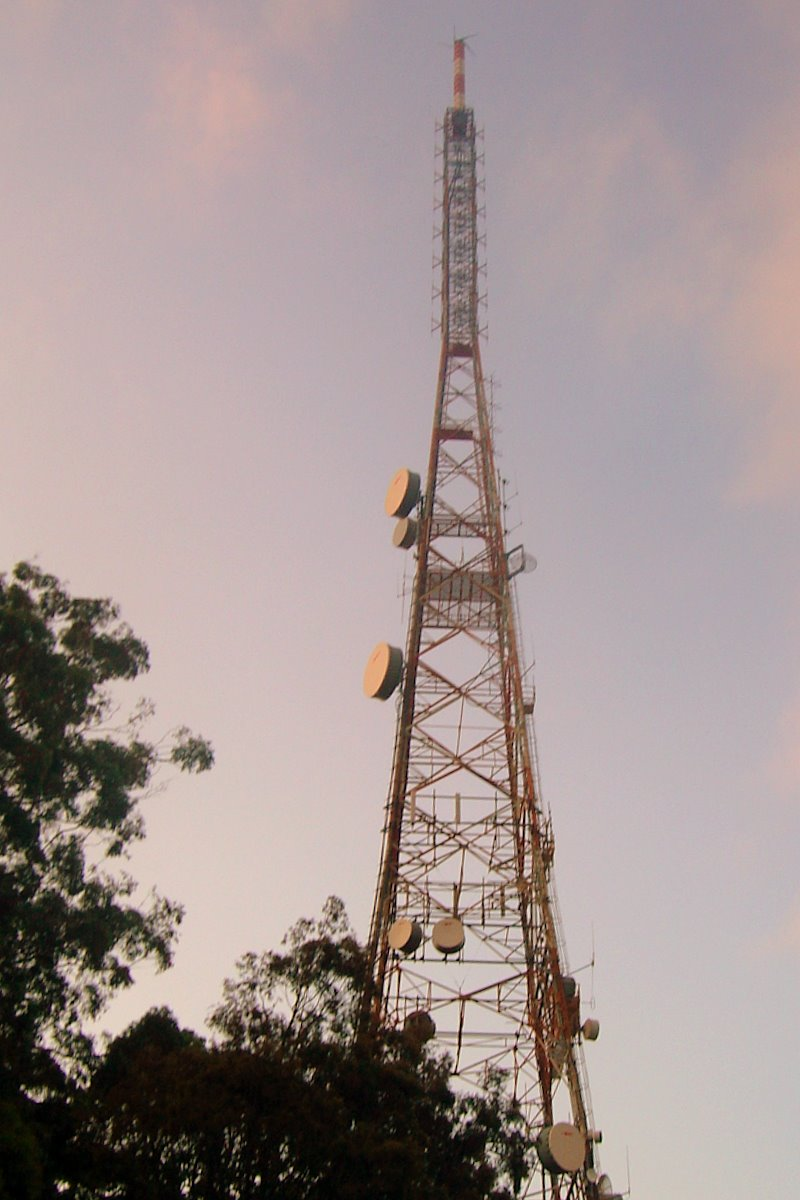
Transmission Tower at Mount Sugarloaf

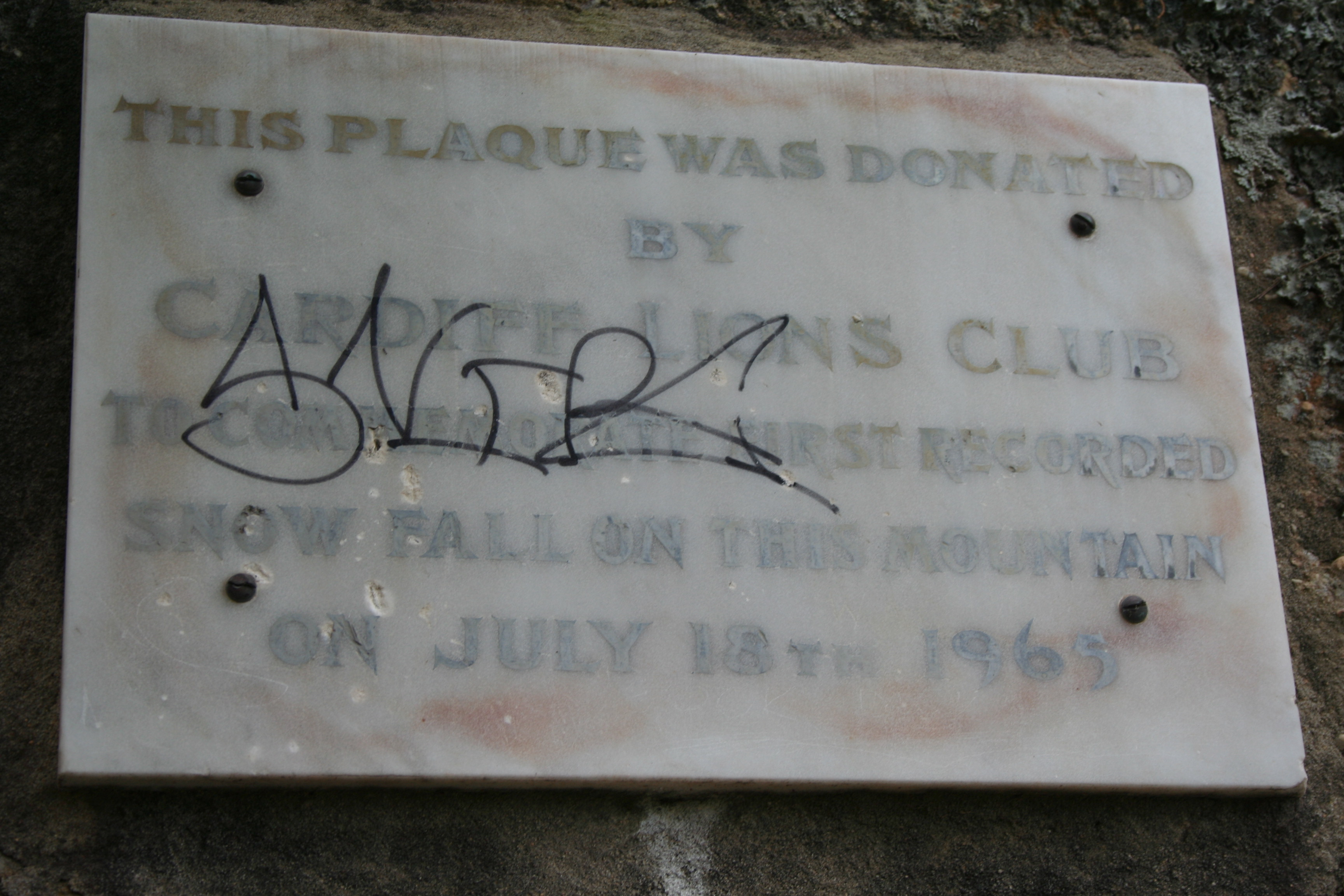
Plaque commemorating the first recorded snowfall on the mountain in 1965

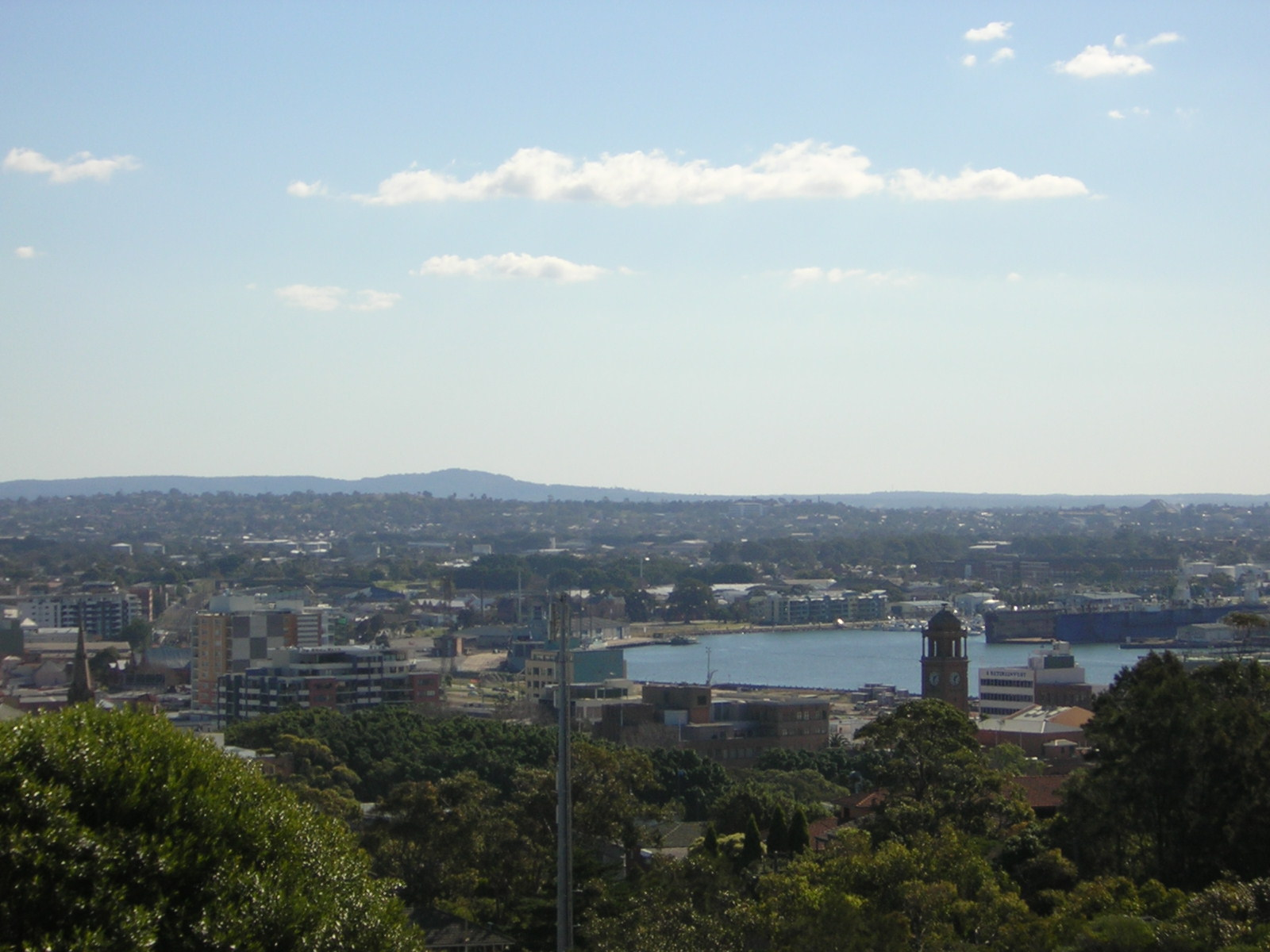
Mount Sugarloaf (just left of centre) as seen from inner city Newcastle

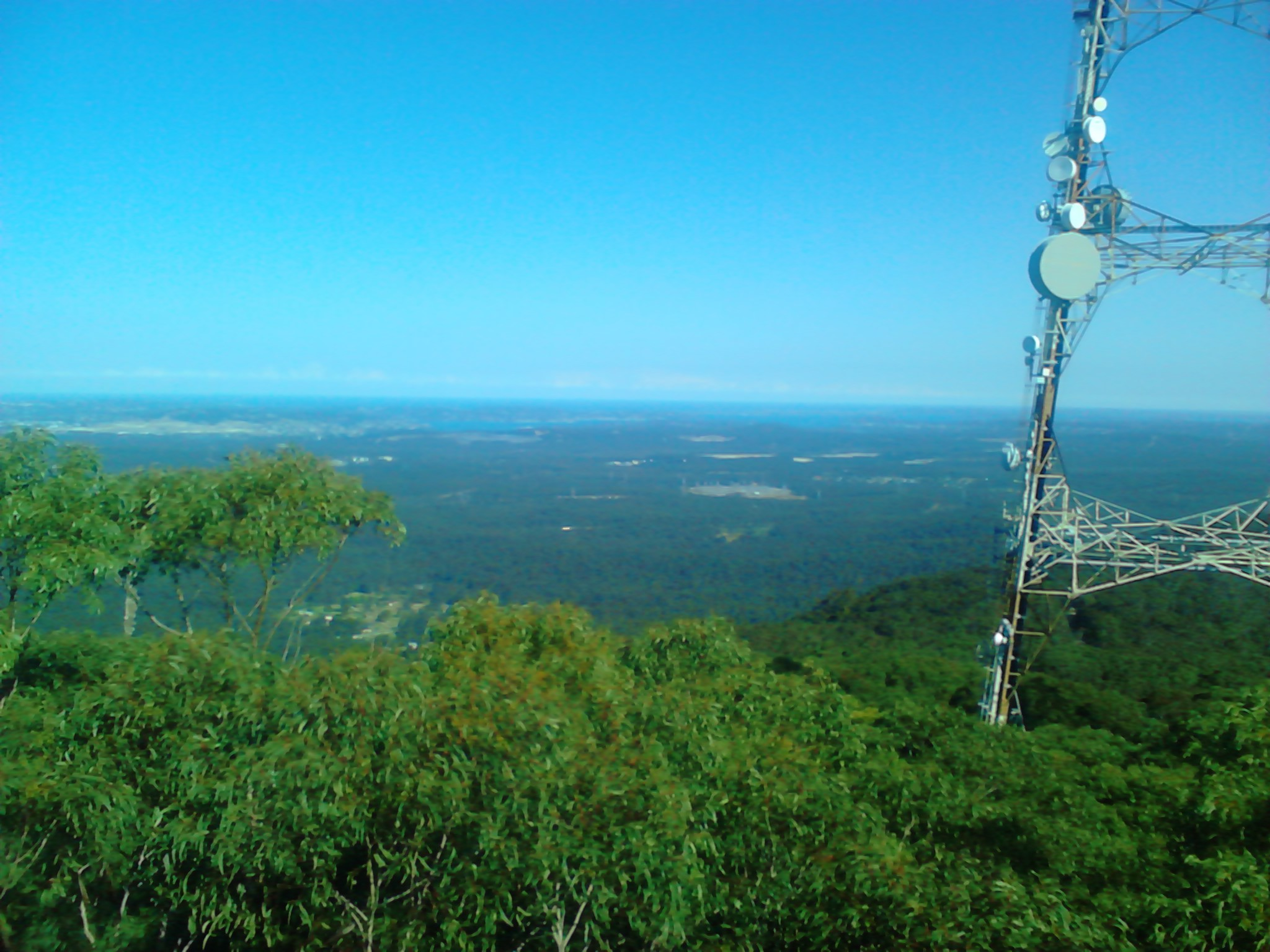
View from the top
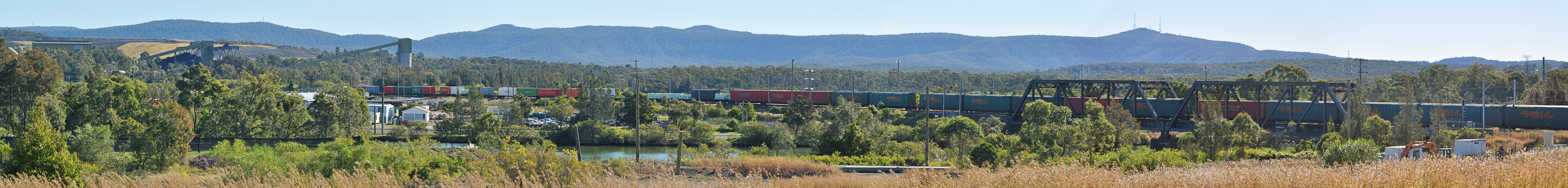
Sugarloaf Range viewed from near Cockle Creek railway station, Boolaroo

== See also ==
- List of mountains in Australia § New South Wales
