= Cessnock High School =

Location
- Aberdare Road, Cessnock, New South Wales; Australia
- Coordinates: 32°50′31.5″S 151°22′09″E

Information
- Type: Government-funded co-educational comprehensive secondary day school
- Motto: Age Quid Agas
- Established: 1938; 88 years ago
- School district: Cessnock; Regional North
- Educational authority: New South Wales Department of Education
- Principal: Peter Riley
- Teaching staff: 62.2 FTE (2024)
- Years: 7–12
- Enrolment: 627 (2024)
- Campus type: Regional
- Colours: Navy and gold
- Website: cessnock-h.schools.nsw.gov.au

Cessnock High School is a government-funded co-educational comprehensive secondary day school, located in Aberdare, in the Hunter Valley of New South Wales, Australia.

The school provides the NSW Higher School Certificate (HSC) in Year 12.

The school enrolled approximately 627 students in 2024, from Year 7 to Year 12, of whom 24 percent identified as Indigenous Australians and two percent were from a language background other than English. The school is operated by the NSW Department of Education; the relieving principal is Belinda Cooper.

The school is part of the Cessnock Community of Great Public Schools, a local management group consisting of 15 schools designed to improve learning, engagement and wellbeing in the region.

== History ==
The school originally opened in 1921 at the location of the current Cessnock Public School. The high school was moved to its current site, on Aberdare Road, in May 1938. Around the time of its relocation, it was the biggest school in the state, and one of the biggest schools in Australia. During World War II, slip trenches were dug out at the school.

The school celebrated 75 years in 2013.

== Notable alumni ==
- Brian Burston - politician
- Douglas Daft – businessman
- Robert Endean – marine scientist and academic
- Eric Fitzgibbon – politician
- John Hughes – writer
- Kenneth Neate – opera singer
- Frank Rickwood – businessman

== See also ==
- List of government schools in New South Wales
- List of schools in the Hunter and Central Coast
- Education in Australia
