= Bruce Litchfield =

Australian architect

Bruce Albert John Litchfield (20 December 1908 – 10 October 1995) was an architect in Darwin, Northern Territory, Australia. He was integral to the reestablishment of Darwin after it was bombed by the Japanese in 1942. He later designed and built many significant early buildings in Katherine.

== Early life ==
Litchfield was born on 20 December 1908 at Gallaghehs Estate, near Cessnock, New South Wales. He was the youngest child of Albert George and Clara Ellen (Nee Eyre). Had four siblings, Clarice Harriet, Aldyth Doris Myee, Albert and Harold Arthur Leslie, who became a navigator for Charles Kingsford Smith's 1928 Trans-Tasman Flight. In 1919 the family moved to Newcastle, New South Wales. Litchfield attended Waratah Public School. After leaving school at 16, Litchfield began work at architects F.G. & A.C. Castleden, while undertaking a Diploma in Architecture at Newcastle Technical College. After graduation in 1938 he went on to work with Pitt & Merryweather.

== Life in the Northern Territory ==
Litchfield was appointed Commonwealth Architect with the Department of the Interior, Works and Services Branch in Darwin in May 1939. He worked alongside Northern Territory architect Beni Burnett, who was best known for his innovative, climate appropriate designs.

He married Jean Francis Gow at the Uniting Church in Darwin 20 March 1940. They had one son, Grahame.

On 19 February 1942, Darwin was bombed by the Japanese. Litchfield was working at the drawing office when the bombs exploded. He was one of only 13 civilians with professional qualifications tasked with reestablishing Darwin. At one stage he was the only architect working on the reconstruction program. He supervised the repair of airstrips and established temporary building constructions. He became a well-known figure in Darwin social life.

Litchfield was posted to Katherine in 1944 as District Officer covering the region from Borroloola to Kalkarindji and south as far as Daly Waters. Katherine was being developed as a provisioning centre by the Australian Army. Litchfield was required to move away from his profession often to accommodate the necessary constructions of kilns, baking ovens, laundries and other essential equipment to service the growing defence population. He also supervised the construction of the Manbulloo Abattoirs, now a World War II heritage site. He also designed and supervised the construction of houses and buildings suited to Katherine's climate, including the Katherine Museum.

== Later life ==
After leaving the Northern Territory, Litchfield worked as the University Architect of the Australian National University in Canberra. He retired on his 60th birthday in 1968. He continued to work as a sole trader.

He married his second wife Dorothy Janet Denbow in the 1980s.

Litchfield died on 10 October 1995 in Killara in Sydney, aged 86 years. He was buried at the Northern Suburbs Memorial Gardens alongside his wife, Dorothy.
