= Rhema FM Newcastle =

Radio station in New South Wales, Australia

99.7 Rhema FM (call sign: 2RFM) is the local Christian radio station for the Newcastle and Hunter Region in New South Wales, Australia. It is funded by a combination of members fees and sponsorship advertising and has some volunteer staffing. It is a registered not-for-profit organisation with charitable status.

Starting out on temporary broadcast on 11 May 1987, the station was granted a permanent licence from 1 December 1999, beating a rival proposed radio station for the blind for the licence.

In 2015 Rhema FM went off air for some weeks, as its transmitter on Mount Sugarloaf failed due to storms affecting the region.

The station promotes local artists on air and offers a variety of community resources.
