= Watagan, New South Wales =

Watagan New South Wales
- Coordinates: 33°01′24″S 151°11′04″E
- Population: 37 (SAL 2021)
- Postcode(s): 2325
- Time zone: AEST (UTC+10)
  - Summer (DST): AEDT (UTC+11)
- LGA(s): City of Cessnock
- Region: Hunter
- County: Northumberland
- Parish: Hay
- State electorate(s): Cessnock
- Federal division(s): Hunter

Watagan is a locality in the City of Cessnock, in the Hunter Region of New South Wales, Australia. It is located east of Laguna.

== History ==
Watagan was a part of the locality of Laguna until 23 October 2015 when Watagan it was separated from Laguna.
