= Neotsfield =

- Location within New South Wales Location within Australia
- 32.5927°S 151.2214°E
- Location: Neotsfield Lane, Whittingham, Singleton Council, New South Wales, Australia

History
- Built: 1827–1888

Site notes
- Architect: Henry Dangar

New South Wales Heritage Register
- Official name: Neotsfield
- Type: state heritage (complex / group)
- Designated: 2 April 1999
- Reference no.: 216
- Type: Homestead Complex
- Category: Farming and Grazing
- Builders: William Dangar (supervisor)

Neotsfield is a heritage-listed homestead at Neotsfield Lane, Whittingham, Singleton Council, New South Wales, Australia. It was designed by Henry Dangar and built from 1827 to 1888, with William Dangar supervising much of the initial construction. What remains of the original property include a two storied brick homestead and associated western wing, the original carriage house and stables building, a meat store, and the remains of a greenhouse. The property includes a ballroom, servants' quarters, gentlemen's parlour, breakfast room and guest reception room, and sits on a 9.71 hectares block fronting onto the Hunter River. The gates and gate house/lodge survive but are no longer part of the Neotsfield property. The eastern wing has been demolished, and the front balcony and verandah roofs are missing. The main building has "lost its face" and its original proportions. It was added to the New South Wales State Heritage Register on 2 April 1999.

== History ==
=== Henry Dangar ===
Henry Dangar (1796-1861) was eldest of six brothers, descendants of an old Jersey (Channel Islands) family. Henry was born at St Neot, Cornwall, son of William Dangar and wife Judith. He was the first of six brothers to emigrate as free settlers to New South Wales. Henry arrived on the "Jessie" on 2 April 1821 and soon after arrival was appointed by Governor Macquarie as assistant in the Survey Department and employed in the counties of Camden and Argyle.

The well-known Dangar was one of the Government surveyors who, with Surveyor Finch, surveyed the Counties of Northumberland and Durham in the Hunter Valley. Dangar was rewarded for his service when Governor Macquarie granted him 700 acres in the Hunter Valley between Morpeth and Raymond Terrace on 6 September 1821.

When Governor Sir Thomas Brisbane began preparations early in 1822 for the free settlement of the Hunter River districts, Dangar was transferred to Newcastle to make a detailed and immediate survey of the valley, which was believed to extend only about 25 miles (40 km) to the north. He prepared the plans of King's Town (Newcastle) and in the next 2 years measured and marked out village reserves, church lands and allocations for settlers along the lower branches of the Hunter River and as far north as Patrick's Plains, furnishing in 1823 a detailed and valuable "Return of Land Cleared and Other Improvements made by Small Settlers". Early in 1824 Colonel James Morisset, commandant at Newcastle, complained that Dangar was paying too much attention to his own 700-acre (283 ha) grant and too little to his official duties, whereupon Surveyor-General John Oxley ordered his transfer to another district.

The order was withdrawn and for the next year Dangar toiled almost unceasingly, marking the road from Newcastle to Wallis Plains (Maitland), measuring reserves and grants and working steadily northwards until he reached the hitherto unsettled upper districts of the Hunter River. In July 1824 he named Fal and Foy Brooks, in August explored the present sites of Muswellbrook, Aberdeen and Scone, crossed the Hunter and discovered and named Kingdon Ponds and Dartbrook. Soon afterwards he arranged an expedition to ascertain "the nature and point of junction of the stream from the westward" which he had observed on his earlier journey up the Hunter. Accompanied by John Richards and two servants, Dangar discovered in October 1824 the confluence of the Goulburn and Hunter Rivers, explored Dartbrook to its head where Allan Cunningham had crossed it in 1823, named Lamorran Brook (Wybong) and crossed the Liverpool Range to the plains beyond.

Cornish place names, scattered through the Hunter Valley, mark Henry Dangar's surveys and record his deep affection for his birthplace. Mount Dangar, Dangarfield and Dangarsleigh commemorate his name. His finest memorial however, was the proud boast of his employees, and their children and grandchildren, that they were "Dangar men".

Henry's brothers William and Thomas arrived in Sydney on 18 March 1825.

His reports caused an immediate rush of applicants for land grants in these desirable new districts and in May 1825 when he revisited the area, he was commissioned to select land for a number of settlers. His main purpose was to accompany and advise Peter McIntyre, superintendent for Thomas Macqueen, in the selection of grants for Macqueen and the McIntyre brothers. On returning from the Upper Hunter Dangar allocated for himself and his brother William land to which McIntyre believed he had prior claim. Dangar suggested a compromise which McIntyre regarded as a bribe and the affair was referred to the Governor, who set up a board of inquiry. The board found Dangar guilty of using his public position for private gain and he was dismissed from office on 31 March 1827. Governor Sir Ralph Darling recommended that he be dispossessed of the land under dispute and required to take his grant in some other district.

Dangar returned to England to appeal against this recommendation, claiming ample precedent for his actions. Oxley supported him, recording that "he has performed his duties with zeal and in the most efficient and correct manner, and afforded no occasion, within my knowledge, in the execution of arduous and perplexing duties, for censure and complaint against his public conduct". Although the appeal was unsuccessful, this visit to England determined Dangar's future career. During the voyage he wrote his "Index and Directory to Map of the Country Bordering Upon the River Hunter", which was published in London in 1828. It demonstrated his skill as a cartographer and ability as a surveyor and brought him to the immediate attention of the directors of the Australian Agricultural Company. He was offered, and accepted, an appointment as a surveyor to the company under Sir Edward Parry. Accompanied by his wife Grace, whom he married at St Neot in Cornwall on 13 May 1828, and with their infant son, William John, (b. 1829) he returned in April 1830 to take up his new position at Port Stephens.

In addition to topographical and soil reports on the company's grants Dangar surveyed its 400,000-acre (161,876 ha) reserve north of the Manning River. So unfavourable were his reports of the whole area that Parry sent him to explore, as an alternative location, the Liverpool Plains districts recommended originally by Oxley. From the headwaters of the Manning, Dangar crossed the Great Dividing Range to the Liverpool Plains, a feat of extreme endurance and skill which he performed for a second time afterwards, and selected for Parry's personal examination an extensive area of attractive land. Parry then visited the district with him and after much negotiation, during which Dangar and the government surveyor, George White, made a joint survey, the company's claim to the land was accepted by the government. This accomplished, Dangar's services were no longer needed and in June 1833 he retired to his property, Neotsfield, near Singleton.

At Newcastle he had boiling down works and meat-processing and tinning works, and in New Zealand he established a steam flour mill near the wheat farms around Official Bay. As a magistrate and member of the District Council his experience and judgement were in frequent demand, and he gave time and energy to the agricultural and political advancement of the Hunter Valley. In common with most large landholders who were seriously short of labour, he supported the proposed reintroduction of transportation and advocated the use of coolie labour. He welcomed the government's immigration policy and sponsored many immigrant families from Britain and later from Saxony. With some hesitation he accepted nomination for the electoral district of Hunter, Brisbane and Bligh in the first elective New South Wales Legislative Council in 1843, but his brothers Thomas and William Dangar, both resident in the Upper Hunter, supported his successful opponent, William Dumaresq. In 1845 he was returned for Northumberland and remained a strongly-conservative member of the council until 1851 when he retired from public life.

The magnitude and complexity of his pastoral and business interests, combined with the incessant demands of public office and private affairs, at length exhausted even Henry Dangar's vitality. Early in 1852 he sailed for England, returning to NSW in 1856 after an extensive tour of the Continent. He lived in retirement at (castle-like) Grantham, Potts Point and died on 2 March 1861 and was buried in the churchyard of All Saints' Church of England, Singleton in a tomb of Italian marble for which his will provided and in which his widow, Grace, was buried on 18 August 1869. Their surviving children were William John of Neotsfield, Henry Cary Dangar MLA, Frederick Holkham, Albert Augustus, Francis Richard, Margaret and Florence.

=== Neotsfield under Dangar ===
On 16 May 1825, Governor Thomas Brisbane granted Henry Dangar 300 acres, situated at Patrick's Plains, near Singleton. He named this grant "Neotsfield" after his native place of St Neot in Cornwall, South-West England. On the same day, he also acquired another 700 acres adjoining this grant, giving a total of 1000 acres for Neotsfield.

Henry's brother, William John (1800-1868) successfully managed Henry's business affairs from 1925 to 1935, including running Neotsfield farm from c. 1827 until 1933, before settling at Turanville, near Scone. William's pastoral interests became so extensive that Turanville was managed by his brother-in-law, Samuel Wellington Cook, whose son established a stud farm there. William inspired many of Henry Dangar's progressive ventures and shared in others until he returned to England in 1857.

William John Dangar supervised the initial house's construction during his years managing Neotsfield. Over the next decade or so the buildings were constructed and became known as Neotsfield. Dangar set cattle on the property and cleared the acres of land around the homestead. Early descriptions of the property indicate that the land was improved in "every known way", with trees being cleared with discretion in order to leave sufficient shade. The property was well-watered by the Hunter River, and tanks and reservoirs filled by windmill pumps meant that there was no shortage of water for the valuable stock. Dangar ran cattle on the property and at one time a small herd of black buck from India. Apparently they bred so profusely that they became a serious nuisance and were eventually presented to the Zoo.

In June 1833, Henry Dangar retired to Neotsfield and took over management of the property. By that time, it was a flourishing and highly developed farm, its stock and produce receiving much favourable comment. Henry Dangar quickly extended his interest, purchasing additional grazing properties and leasing extensive runs which by 1850 amounted to more than 300,000 acres (121, 407 ha). Along the Great North Road to the Liverpool Plains he acquired town allotments and established inns and stores.

The main house block would have been erected some time between 1833 and 1838. It had wide verandahs, was designed around a three-sided courtyard (i.e. had two wings). The eastern wing contained temporary family quarters and a convict cell situated below the southern end of the building. These quarters were used until such time as the house block was built. It was a large and complex group with 29 rooms built over a period of approximately 50 years.

Due to financial difficulties in early 1838, Henry was forced to advertise Neotsfield and his other Hunter River properties for sale. These financial difficulties were apparently overcome and consequently the property was retained by Henry Dangar.

An advertisement in the Sydney Morning Herald said Neotsfield was "to be sold and let, by private bargain, and possession [sic] to be given on the 31st May 1838...". Later it offered this description:

The house and offices are brick built and complete, and fit for the residence of a genteel family; they have been erected under the proprietor's own superintendence and combine elegance with comfort. The house contains entrance hall, dining and drawing rooms, six bedrooms, pantry, stores and servants' apartments, and having in front a spacious and elegant verandah. The offices are detached, and consist of kitchen, laundry, dairy, store, office, larder, cellars, granary, servants' rooms, coach-house and stabling for ten horses'.

The properties were eventually taken off the market, probably due to some planning on the part of Henry's brother, William. Henry occupied Neotsfield with his wife and family of three sons from 1833 to 1857. Between 1843 and 1847 he amassed squattages of over 300,000 acres in New England, on the Liverpool Plains, on the Namoi River and on the Gwydir River. He was elected a Member of the Colonial New South Wales Legislative Assembly from 1845 to 1851.

Henry Dangar died at his home "Grantham" in Potts Point, Sydney on 2 March 1861. His wife Grace, as executrix, continued to manage his properties and estates which he had acquired, until she distributed them in 1868. She died at Neotsfield on 16 August 1869.

=== Dangar's descendants at Neotsfield ===
Neotsfield passed from Grace Dangar to their son William John (W. J.) Dangar, not to be confused with the property's former manager, his uncle of the same name. During W. J. Dangar's time here he was responsible for starting and developing one of the most successful and highly respected throroughbred horse studs in Australia. He was also a member of the then Horticultural Society of Sydney (Horticultural Society of NSW). This consisted of prominent members of the colony and professional gardeners. His interest in horticulture most certainly resulted in the development of the formal layout of the magnificent garden at Neotsfield. The garden was laid out to the front and two sides of the main house block and was about two acres in extent. Italian Carrara marble urns/vases stood on the front verandah in his time here.

c. 1870 W. J. Dangar, living at Neotsfield at the time, thought of pulling down the house and building a new one, and had plans drawn up in London. However, possibly due to the ill health of his wife Marian at the time, he did not proceed with the implementation of these plans and consequently sold them to a neighbour, Duncan Forbes Mackay. Following some alterations to the original plans by Benjamin Backhouse the magnificent mansion "Minimbah" was constructed between 1874 and 1877. Marian Dangar died on the 22 July 1881 aged 51 some 4 years following the completion of Minimbah homestead and during which time having a constant view in the distance of what could have been her new home. (ref Gregoy Knodler "Henry Dangar's Neotsfield 1825-2015")

Many of the fine Victorian additions to the homestead at this time, together with the construction of the wooden stables. William also acquired more land during his ownership of Neotsfield. William Dangar died at Neotsfield on 3 August 1890. There were no children from his marriage.

Neotsfield passed to the late William's brother Henry Cary Dangar along with its established thoroughbred stud. He quickly became well known as a breeder and an owner of great racehorses and also as a member of the committee of the Australian Jockey Club. One of Henry C. Dangar's best horses bred at Neotsfield at this time was a horse named "Gibraltar". He also imported a horse named "Positano", who later sired the immortal racehorse "Poseidon" at Neotsfield stud.

In 1895 the property passed to Richard Halifax (R. H.) Dangar, William's nephew. He continued breeding thoroughbred horses and Suffolk Punch horses for farm work. The most famous horse bred there during his time was "Poseidon". He was sold as a foal at foot at the break up of the Neotsfield stud in 1904 and consequently became the winner of 19,000 pounds in stakes.

R. H. Dangar was probably responsible for the Boom-style additions to the house itself, in the form of the upper servants' quarters above the billiard room. He too acquired extra land after becoming the owner and by 1900, the Neotsfield estate had grown to around 8000 acres in area.

=== Neotsfield's subdivisions (1913; 1914; 1923) ===
The original approach to the homestead was by way of a drive from the former gates and Gate Lodge on the present New England Highway further towards Singleton. A service drive on the northern side of the homestead was linked to the river by a gravel drive. The first and second subdivisions resulted in the main entry road from the Gate House lodge and gates on the New England Highway passing through five of the newly created blocks. This isolated the gates and Gate Lodge on a 50-acre land parcel. As a consequence a lane about 300 yards to the north of the old entry road and running south along the boundary line was incorporated in the subdivision plan. This access lane to Neotsfield later became known as Haggarty's Lane. Before it reached the homestead block it veered slightly to the south until it met the last section of the old entrance road at the boundary of the homestead block before proceeding on.

The first subdivision of the Neotsfield Estate was surveyed by Newcastle surveyor William Francis Hall in December 1913. In 1914 subdivision and auction sale of 11 small farm lots (between 37 and 63 acres) followed.

On 3 March 1914 the second subdivision took place. This resulted in another 14 small farms (38-55 acres) being created (surveyed by Sydney surveyor, W. H. Gregson). It was not until 12 June 1920 that these blocks were advertised for sale. Sales continued until January 1923 when it was noted that all of the first and second subdivisions of the Neotsfield Estate had been sold.

Part included the homestead block of 400 acres. This block was then further subdivided until it consisted of 226 acres 7 roods 33 perches (a 1944 survey found the actual area was 219 acres 6 roods). It was finally sold to John Frederick Knodler in April 1924 and he took possession on 1 July 1924.

The second 1920 subdivision resulted in the main entry road from the lodge gates on the New England Highway passing through five of the newly created blocks. This effectively isolated the lodge gates and residence on a 50-acre parcel of land. As a consequence a lane about 300 yards to the north of the old entry road and running south along the boundary line was incorporated into the subdivision plan. This access lane to Neotsfield later became known as Haggarty's Lane. Before it reached the homestead it veered slightly to the south until it met the last section of the old entrance road at the boundary of the homestead block before proceeding on (*3, 8). Since 1920-24 the approach to the homestead has been via the rear or service yard, rather than to the front of the house. (*2, 8, *4, 8). In 1928 all that remained of the once 8000-acre Neotsfield holding was the homestead block of 226 acres (*3, 8). A 1944 survey found this was in fact 220 acres (*3, 9)

Richard Dangar vacated Neotsfield on 16 July 1924. He had purchased a property at Turee, Cassilis and took with him the ornate Carrara marble urns/vases from the house's front verandah. He died at Cassilis on 19 August 1940.

=== Knodler family ===
John F. Knodler took possession of Neotsfield on 1 July 1924. The purchase price was 10,000 pounds after an amount of 500 pounds had been allowed for maintenance and painting of the homestead and adjacent buildings. Three timber houses stood along the upper banks of the river. His son George Frederick Knodler and his wife took up residence in one, while the other two were occupied by workmen. A modern dairy was constructed almost immediately and one of the first irrigation plants in the Hunter river was installed. The latest machinery needed to work the property efficiently was purchased. Two men were employed specifically to tend the gardens and regular maintenance was carried out on the buildings. The house and buildings were well maintained using some of the same tradespeople that Richard Dangar had employed.

Early in their ownership, Knodler and his three sons George, Frederick and Earle became involved in breeding and racing horses. Each year yearlings were transported to Sydney to be auctioned by renowned bloodstock expert and family friend Ken Austin of H. Chisholm and Co. bloodstock sales (later William Inglis and Son). The most successful horse was named "Lady Neot".

Bloodstock was also taken on agistment, the most famous of which was the racehorse "Statesman", who was sent to Neotsfield for several months by his owner and prominent Sydney trainer, Mr. W. Kelso. On his return to racing he was entered in the 1928 Melbourne Cup which he consequently won.

Thoroughbred Clydesdale draught horses were also stabled on the property during this period. A Guernsey cattle stud was also established at Neotsfield.

The lighting plant was taken out of service in the late 1920s and the homestead converted to normal supply. The other three houses were connected at this time.

John F. Knodler died at Neotsfield on 25 July 1938. The farm was then managed by his wife Christiana until 16 February 1944, when plans were made for subdivision. At that time, Neotsfield was surveyed and subdivided into three lots of 73 acres 2 roods by surveyor Cephas Scott (Scott & Crisp). After the transfer of each lot on 7 August 1944 to each of Christiana's sons, Lot 3 became Neotsfield and the property of Frederick C. Y. Knodler.

After creating the three properties, an agreement was reached between the three brothers regarding the two timber stable buildings. The first set of stables that stood on the left of the entry road and north of the homestead's west wing was dismantled and reconstructed on Neots Park (and remains standing). The second set of stables further along and opposite the brick stables were also dismantled and relocated on Lar Neot. These no longer exist. The corn shed which was adjacent to the wool shed was also moved to Neots Park (and remains standing). The middle timber house which was the residence of George F. Knodler was relocated on his property Lar Neot. The statue from the south-west corner of the garden, together with the steel hedge fence and several concrete vases were relocated in the house garden at Neots Park.

Frederick Cornwell York (C.Y.) Knodler, as the new owner, built a dairy south of the brick stables and on the opposite side of the entry road. He continued general farming and dairying on the property.

In 1947 the original dairy which had been built by John Knodler in 1924 and located in Neots Park was totally destroyed by fire. Building materials were in very short supply at this time so it was decided to demolish the east wing of Neotsfield and recycle the bricks and timber. The east wing was causing some concern due to bowing walls and general deterioration. Materials that could be salvaged were used to build the dairy that still stands on Neots Park.

On 22 November 1948 Neotsfield was sold and transferred to the government of the day to become Crown Land for closer settlement. The transfer and surrender reads: "To his Most Gracious Majesty King George the Sixth for the purposes of The Closer Settlement Acts".

=== Crown Land leased (1948-1975) ===
Reginald T. Tom was granted the Crown Land Closer Settlement lease of Neotsfield on 26 November 1948. He continued to farm Neotsfield and operate the dairy. Later in his tenure he became involved in contract hay baling on some adjacent farms.

During his occupancy the homestead became neglected and consequently fell into a state of disrepair. A hole developed in the slate roof and this was not repaired. This allowed water entry causing long term damage. Various items from in and around the house were sold to interested parties. The brass bell from the bell post is thought to have been sold to one of the Singleton schools. A large clover leaf shaped cement section garden bed surround was sold to a local resident. The life-sized garden statue from the south-eastern corner of the garden was also sold.

The broken pieces of elegant black marble fireplace from the dining room were much later found scattered around the grounds. Pieces of ruby glass windows from the mezzanine level bathrooms also were later found in the garden. The staircase railing also became damaged. Shutters were removed and disposed of. The garden at the front and sides of the homestead gradually became overgrown with grass and weeds until it was used as an area to run cattle. The pebbled gravel on the surface of the courtyard on the northern side of the house was also not raked or maintained resulting in this area also grassing over. It remains in this state to the present. In 1955 flood water entered the house to a depth of 12 to 14 inches. The woolshed was destroyed by fire and the front balcony and verandah became so dangerous that they had to be demolished. During this process the finely carved sandstone columns were broken into pieces and the balcony joists were shortened in length with a saw. Neotsfield was now in a very neglected state.

After Tom's death the property passed to his son, Donald Tom, who was granted the lease on 22 May 1968. For the next five years he continued to farm Neotsfield. After this he decided to move to a larger property to grow wheat. The property then passed to J. and J. E. Britts on 10 June 1973. During the Britts' occupancy no restoration work of any consequence occurred and Neotsfield continued to languish.

=== Recovery: Ted & Lesley Crimmings (1975-97) ===
After two years of the Britts' lease, the property was again placed on the market and the leasehold purchased by Ted and Lesley Crimmings on 28 August 1975 for $81,000. Both were schoolteachers who had moved from Sydney with the intention of restoring Neotsfield to its former Georgian glory. Considering the very poor condition of the homestead they faced a huge challenge, including clearing the billiard room where food for goats had been stored. The large hole in the eastern side of the slate roof needed immediate attention to prevent even more water entering the building. This was done using corrugated iron sheeting. The roof now had three covering materials: slate, asbestos shingles over the servants' quarters and corrugated iron. Internally, broken pieces of black marble fireplace found scattered in the garden were glued back together. Pieces of ruby glass from the mezzanine level bathroom windows found in the garden were also refitted.

Cedar joinery throughout the house required stripping of paint.

After Neotsfield was heritage-listed (in 1983 a permanent conservation order was placed on it under the NSW Heritage Act 1977), a $3000 Heritage Council grant in 1981 provided some funds to pay for an architectural assessment. Other grants were provided as the work continued. General restoration continued over many years before the balcony and verandah could be rebuilt.

Only the shortened balcony joists remained as a guide to the replacement of this section of the house. Architects Suters and Busteed were engaged to provide plans for the work. By 1990 both balcony and verandah had been replaced to look like the original structures. However some materials used and certain elements of their design were not the same as the original. Instead of timber, flat sheeting was used to line the underside of the roof of the verandah. Corrugated iron was used to cover the top of the roof instead of slate. Perhaps understandably, the sandstone pillars were replaced with sandstone-coloured concrete columns because of cost. The original timber beams between the pillars were not a full curve as (built) on the reconstructed verandah. Instead the curved timber pieces that came from each pillar were originally relatively short in length.

On 15 March 1994 Neotsfield was surveyed by surveyor Robert George to subdivide the property into two lots and provide an access road from the homestead to Racecourse Lane. Lots 31 and 32 were created with the house on Lot 31 and comprising 23.9 acres.

Following a severe hailstorm at Singleton in December 1996 the covering on the house's roof was so badly damaged that it required complete replacement. This was done in 1997 using imported slate.

=== Recent owners ===
The property was sold to Neville Hodkinson and possession given during 1997. He remained there until January 2015. There was no significant restoration of Neotsfield homestead during this period. However, two unauthorised bathrooms were installed with one of these as part of a bedroom and the other on the upper level of the western wing. (Ref Henry Dangar's Neotsfield 1825-2015).

In 2004, the Sydney Morning Herald reported that it had "in the past been open for inspection" but that it had recently changed hands and its status was "in limbo".

After several years on the market Neotsfield was finally sold in February 2015, for $795,000. This time to an unnamed local family, with "plans to ensure its continued preservation"

=== House ===
The main buildings, in (Victorian) Regency (Revival) style were originally designed around a three-sided courtyard, with the homestead itself being built after the two wings. These were used as a kitchen, servants' rooms, store, dairy, scullery, convict cellar and temporary family quarters while the residence itself was constructed.

The main house block would have been erected some time between 1833 and 1838. It had wide verandahs, was designed around a three-sided courtyard (i.e. had two wings). It was a large and complex group with 29 rooms built over a period of approximately 50 years.

The billiard room at the western end of the house with the servants' quarters over was a much-later structure as was the Victorian-styled porch and bathroom to the service yard (western and northern sides of the homestead, respectively). These later works were commissioned by Henry Dangar's son, William John Dangar and carried out between 1864 and 1866 while William and his wife were in Europe. (Ref Gregory J E Knodler Henry Dangar's Neotsfield 1825 - 2015).

The eastern wing was demolished. It had contained the temporary family quarters and a convict cell underneath until such time as the house block was built.

Only the western wing remains and is much altered internally to its original form. It was intended for use as a servant's rooms, storehouse, kitchen, scullery, dairy room etc. The blank western wall of this wing, as well as the eastern wall of the matching wing, was relieved by the use of an arcaded effect achieved by the use of semi-circular headed recesses formed in the brickwork. This rhythmic device provided sufficient visual interest to overcome what would perhaps have been an overpowering planar quality to the wall, unsympathetic to the remainder of the forms.

=== Outbuildings ===
Of the original outbuildings, only the Stables, Meat House and the base of the former Green House remain.

Stables

The Stables are in need of further reconstruction work to the external walls (some has been done), new roofing and roof plumbing and new flooring to the Hay Loft.

Meat House

The Meat House remains in almost original condition externally. Its roof plumbing and timberwork should be treated to prevent further deterioration.

Green House

Only the rendered base of the former green house remains.

Shed

There is also a derelict shed between the Meat House and the western wing.

=== Garden ===
Only a few remnants remain of the original formal garden which surrounded three sides of the house. These include the former turning circle centre surround, together with some large trees.

The original formal garden was laid out to the front and two sides of the main house block and about two acres in extent It also included an orchard, a kitchen garden and a vinery of table grapes. The green house, with its glazed roof, was apparently used to raise ferns and palms. Only the base of the green house remains today. The garden at the front and sides of the house gradually became overgrown with grass and weeds until it was used as an area to run cattle. The formal garden layout had disappeared.

Italian vases of Carrara marble (8) that once graced the front of the house (*4, 8) were taken by Richard Dangar when he left Neotsfield in 1924 and installed at his new property in Cassilis. The bases of three concrete garden vases (once a number of these were laid out across the garden) remain (*4, 4).

Remnants of the symmetrical layout to the front include the former turning circle centre surround and some planting including some large trees. These formed part of an ornamental section of the garden and were surrounded by lawns, shrubs and flower beds.

The garden at the front and sides of the house gradually became overgrown with grass and weeds until it was used as an area to run cattle. The formal garden layout had disappeared.

Trees include the Californian desert fan palm (Washingtonia robusta).

=== Modifications and dates ===
- 1821 Henry Dangar was granted 700 acres between Morpeth and Raymond Terrace in the Hunter Valley. In 1825 this grant became part of Neotsfield when Dangar was granted another 300 acres to give a total of 1000 acres. (Ref Henry Dangar's Neotsfield 1825- 2015).
- c. 1821-33: Carriage House & Stables built (before the house) to the north east of the house's eastern wing, having its main axis at right angles to the other two.
- 1833-8: house built: The house's eastern wing was built first - containing the temporary family quarters and the convict cell below the eastern end of the building until such time as the house block. The western wing was originally detached, consisting of kitchen, laundry, dairy, store, office, larder, cellars granary, servants' rooms, coach-house, and stabling for ten horses' (this became the western wing, in time joined to the house). The approach was by way of a drive from the former gates and Gate Lodge situated on the New England highway further towards Singleton. A service drive on the northern side of the homestead was linked to the river by a gravel drive.
- 1833-88: various additions to make the homestead a large complex around a three-sided courtyard. Probably the lower roof of the ground floor verandah did not exist (in 1838) and was added at a later date along with finely turned stone columns when the verandah was extended along the east and west walls of the house.
- 1860s+: horse stud use introduced and intensified. Fencing, yards etc. developed under William J. Dangar. He also developed the formal garden, an area of around 2 acres around the house. He also acquired more land for the farm. The billiard room at the western end of the house with the servants' quarters over it was a much-later structure as was the porch and bathroom to the service yard (western and northern sides of the homestead, respectively). These later works were commissioned by Henry Dangar's son, William John Dangar. William John Dangar concentrated on improving the quality of the racehorse stud and imported high class thoroughbreds and Arab horses. This was continued by Henry C. Dangar between 1890 and 1895.
- 1895+: Richard H. Dangar additions to the homestead and land to the farm.
- 1900: Neotsfield's land holding covered around 8000 acres
- c. 1900?: undated photography shows the timber outbuildings associated with the stables - these have since been demolished. Pierced brickwork to provide ventilation is visible in the hay loft.
- From 1900 to 1924: under Richard H. Dangar's ownership the estate of 8000 acres was subdivided into a series of small farms and sold off.
- c. 1913: first floor servants' quarters built along with an infill panel between balcony and verandah roof. Italian urns line up along the ground floor verandah posts beside the drive.
- 1914: subdivision and auction sale of 11 small farm lots (between 37 and 63 acres).
- 1920: second subdivision tinto another 14 small farms (38-55 acres) were advertised for sale. Sales continued until 1923 when all of the first and second subdivision lots had been sold.
- 1923: final subdivision of the Estate. Part included the homestead block of 400 acres. This block was then further subdivided until it consisted of 226 acres 7 roods 33 perches (a 1944 survey found the actual area was 219 acres 6 roods).
- John F. Knodler added a modern dairy soon after 1924, one of the first irrigation plants on the Hunter River and the latest farm machinery
- 1924 Richard Dangar vacated Neotsfield on 16/7/1924, taking the ornate Carrara marble urns from the front verandah. A large disposal sale of household goods and furniture was held on behalf of Richard Dangar in Neotsfield's courtyard in June that year. The Knodler family built a modern dairy, one of the first irrigation plants in the Hunter and purchased the latest machinery needed to work the property efficiently.
- Late 1920s - the lighting plant taken out of service and the homestead converted to normal supply. The other three houses were connected at this time (*4: 5, 9).
- 1947 Eastern wing was demolished. The property has been subdivided into a number of smaller farms over the years, separating the former gate house from the homestead and altering the direction of approach
- 1955 Most devastating Hunter river flood ever recorded. Floodwater entered Neotsfield homestead to a depth of around 350mm..
- 1974 Neotsfield was subdivided into two lots and an access road was provided from the homestead to Racecourse Lane. Lots 31 and 32 were created.
- 1975-97: The Crimmings purchased Neotsfield to live in it and restore it. Considering the very poor condition of the homestead they faced a huge challenge, including clearing the Billiard Room where food for goats had been stored. The large hole in the slate roof needed immediate attention to prevent even more water from entering the building. This was done using corrugated iron sheeting. The roof now had three covering materials: slate, asbestos shingles over the servants' quarters and corrugated iron. Internally, the broken black marble fireplace pieces rescued from the garden were glued back together. The pieces of Ruby glass from the mezzanine level bathroom windows were also refitted. Cedar joinery throughout the house required stripping of paint.
- 1977: only the western wing remains and is much altered internally. It was intended for use as a servant's rooms, storehouse and dairy
- In 1981 the group of buildings included the two storied brick homestead and associated western wing, the original carriage house and stables building and other minor outbuildings including a meat store and the remains of a greenhouse.
- 1980s: renovations
- December 1994: Western Wing: repaired and replaced roofing iron, fascia, eaves, guttering and downpipes after damage by wind storms and fires of 12/93 and 1/94. A gable on the western side of the wing was removed. Guttering, eaves, fascia and downpipes to the main house were also replaced. Restoration work to west wing's interior to commence afterwards.
- 1996 Following a severe hailstorm the badly damaged iron, asbestos and original slate sections of the roof were completely replaced with imported slate. This was carried out in early 1997.

== Heritage listing ==
Neotsfield was listed on the New South Wales State Heritage Register on 2 April 1999 having satisfied the following criteria.

The place is important in demonstrating the course, or pattern, of cultural or natural history in New South Wales.

The place has a strong or special association with a person, or group of persons, of importance of cultural or natural history of New South Wales's history.

The history of Neotsfield is the history of Henry Dangar and his family. Dangar has a place in history for his contribution to the country's early development; working as a surveyor for both the government and later the A. A. Company literally put Newcastle and its surroundings on the map. The Dangar family built up strong commercial interests in the Upper Hunter and the name can be linked with neighbouring properties such as "Baroona" and "Minimbah". Neotsfield homestead, with its various changes over the years, provides documentary evidence of the history of Henry Dangar and his family. Its preservation is essential.

The place is important in demonstrating aesthetic characteristics and/or a high degree of creative or technical achievement in New South Wales.

Neotsfield is significant for its combination of architectural styles, rather than being a precise example of one particular style. The main house block was built in (Victorian) Regency (Revival) style with the later Billiards Room and rear porch and bathroom additions being in Victorian style. Still later the first-floor servants' quarters and kitchen stair link were constructed in Boom style. Deamer (1971) considers that these later additions were commissioned by Henry's son William in an endeavour to match "the pile created by his brother Albert at 'Baroona' ". The interesting manner in which the blank outer walls of the two wings were relieved has been mentioned previously. The now-demolished verandah to the front was a good example of architectural detailing of the time, with finely-turned stone columns supporting its roof. The placement and form of the various out buildings is an important element in the complex. The Carriage House and Stable, Meat House and Green House are all visually interesting buildings that add to the significance of the homestead. Unfortunately the former Gate House, which is also a fine piece of architecture, no longer belongs to the same property.

The place has a strong or special association with a particular community or cultural group in New South Wales for social, cultural or spiritual reasons.

Neotsfield is a landmark in the Singleton district, together with the other former pastoral homesteads. These properties and their family history are known to many people within the community. They form part of an image of farming and grazing properties set along the Hunter River. With the present influx of industrial development in the Hunter Valley, and in the Singleton district, properties of this type can be a timely reminder of the past to both old and new generations.

The place possesses uncommon, rare or endangered aspects of the cultural or natural history of New South Wales.

The place is important in demonstrating the principal characteristics of a class of cultural or natural places/environments in New South Wales.

Neotsfield is undoubtedly a landmark in the Singleton district, together with the other former pastoral homesteads. These properties and their family history are known to many people within the community. They form part of an image of rich farming and grazing properties set along the Hunter River. With the influx of industrial development in the Hunter Valley, and particularly in the Singleton district, properties of this type can be a reminder of the past.
