= Minimbah House =

Heritage-listed mansion in Whittingham, South Wales

Coordinates: 32.6291°S 151.1968°E

Minimbah House is a heritage-listed mansion in Whittingham near Singleton, New South Wales.

== Construction ==
c 1870 W.J. Dangar who was living at Neotsfield at the time, thought of pulling down the house and building a new one and had plans drawn up in London. However, due to the ill health of his wife Marian (not her death as has been incorrectly documented in the literature) he did not proceed with the implementation of these plans and consequently sold them to a neighbour , Duncan Forbes Mackay. Following some alterations to the original plans by Benjamin Backhouse the magnificent mansion "Minimbah was constructed between 1874 and 1877. Marian Dangar died on the 22nd July 1881 aged 51 some 4 years following the completion of Minimbah homestead and which time having a constant view in the distance of what could have been her new home, (ref Gregory Knodler "Henry Dangar's Neotsfield 1825 - 2015)

== Description ==
The property sits on 48 hectares and contains 45 rooms. The mansion 3000 square metres with a house cover one acre. The house is styled in Victorian Filigree with a cast iron verandah. The house has two stories made out of sandstone with a U-shaped floor plan. It has open French windows and an ornamental stone chimneys. The staircase is made of Australian cedar and rosewood which was hand carved in Germany. There are three small outbuildings with painted corrugated iron roofs. The stained windows are the first to feature native Australian animals. There is surveillance tower which was used as look out for bushrangers with a hide away for children.

== Restoration ==
Duncan Forbes Mackay expanded the property to 30,000 acres soon after purchasing it. In 1932/33 Mrs Birdsall redecorated Minimbah throughout, including ceiling to floor heavy velvet hand embraided curtains, a hand painted wisteria mural feature wall in the sitting room, two Italian Marble urns on marble pedestals at each side of the stairway. /> In 1973 saw the property restored and also the addition of swimming pool, stables and horse yards, concrete tennis court and landscaping. The 1973 restoration project cost about $1 million. In June 1997 a heritage 2001 application was lodged to the Heritage Office in order to complete general repairs and maintenance. In the early 2000s restoration was overseen by Newcastle heritage architect Barney Collins.

== Ownership ==
In 1823 Duncan Forbes Mackay bought the property from John Cobb that was 2,000 acres. According to local stories Mackay built the house after not being invited to party the Dangar family property Baroona. After Mackay died in 1894 the property was sold to the mining magnate Sylvester Brown in 1901. In 1915 John Morrissey brought the property and later sold it to Mr Foden. In 1932 Mr. J.W. Birdsall purchased Dulcalmah/Minimbah and 1,200 acres and substantially redecorated it. In 1940 Minimbah was seconded by the Australian Army for training purposes(?). Mr. Birdsall died March 1945 and Minimbah was handed back to Mrs Birdsall in August 1945. Many of the PC items had been stripped from the house (crystal door handles, and brass wear etc) and left in an appalling condition. Mrs Birdsall was so appalled she sold it to the Australian Inland Mission Bible Society at a give away price. > In 1973 Marie and Alwyn Wells purchased the property. In 1982 Frank Richwood purchased the property for $300,000 and lived for 11 years. In 1994 it was purchased by Bliss Ryan for $940,000. In 2007 the property was sold for $3.21 million.
