= Laguna, New South Wales =

Laguna Cessnock, New South Wales
- Coordinates: 32°59′24″S 151°8′4″E
- Population: 216 (2016 census); 548 (2011 census)
- Postcode(s): 2325
- Time zone: AEST (UTC+10)
  - Summer (DST): AEDT (UTC+11)
- Location: 121 km (75 mi) NNW of Sydney; 37 km (23 mi) SW of Cessnock; 89 km (55 mi) WSW of Newcastle
- LGA(s): City of Cessnock
- Region: Hunter
- County: Northumberland
- Parish: Yango
- State electorate(s): Cessnock
- Federal division(s): Hunter

Laguna is a locality in the city of Cessnock, in the Hunter Region of New South Wales, Australia. It is located about 37 km (23 mi) southwest of Cessnock in the Wollombi Valley.

== History ==
A large land grant of 1,000 acres (405 ha) was allocated to Heneage Finch, which he named "Laguna". Laguna House is located to the south of Laguna on the Great North Road.
