= Kearsley, New South Wales =

Kearsley New South Wales
- Coordinates: 32°51′25″S 151°23′49″E
- Population: 861 (2016 census)
- Postcode(s): 2325
- Elevation: 56 m (184 ft)
- Time zone: AEST (UTC+10)
  - Summer (DST): AEDT (UTC+11)
- Location: 145 km (90 mi) N of Sydney; 48 km (30 mi) W of Newcastle; 28 km (17 mi) SW of Maitland
- LGA(s): City of Cessnock
- Region: Hunter
- County: Northumberland
- Parish: Cessnock
- State electorate(s): Cessnock
- Federal division(s): Hunter

Kearsley is a village in the City of Cessnock, in the Hunter Region of New South Wales, Australia. Kearsley is located 5.7 kilometres south-east of the town of Cessnock, NSW and is adjacent to Werakata National Park. The village was named after William Kearsley, a prominent member of the New South Wales Legislative Assembly and official in the miner's union.

At the heart of the town from its foundation in 1912 until closure in 1964 was J & A Brown & Abermain Seaham Collieries mine, the Abermain No.2 Colliery, the first mechanised pit in the Cessnock coalfield. Coal was shipped out via the South Maitland Railways.

== Population ==
According to the 2016 census of Population, there were 861 people living in Kearsley.

- Aboriginal and Torres Strait Islander people made up 9.1% of the population.
- 89.8% of people were born in Australia. The next most common countries of birth were England 0.7%, New Zealand 0.7% and Germany 0.5%.
- 93.5% of people spoke only English at home.
- The most common responses for religion were No Religion 30.0%, Anglican 28.6% and Catholic 15.4%.

== Notable people ==
- Maree Callaghan, first female mayor of the City of Cessnock
- Arthur Francis CSC OAM, former Regimental Sergeant Major of the Australian Army
- Oscar Hillery MM, World War I hero and recipient of the Military Medal
- George Jeffery MM, World War I hero and recipient of the Military Medal
- Reg Lindsay OAM, country music singer
- Bob Pynsent, longest serving mayor of the City of Cessnock
- Bill Rorke, soccer player
