= Cessnock, New South Wales =

Cessnock
- Town
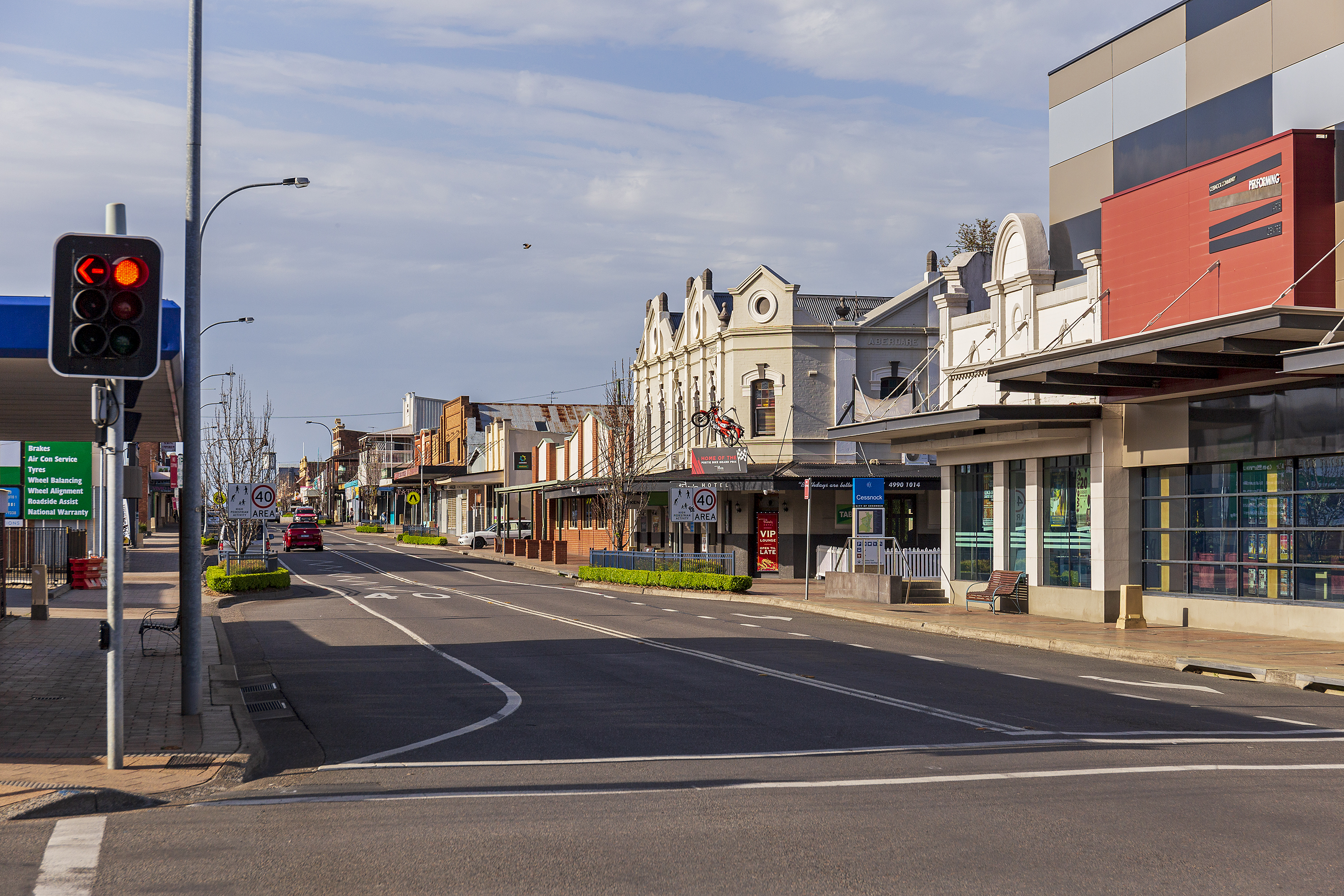
- Vincent Street, the main street of Cessnock

- Coordinates: 32°50′3″S 151°21′19.8″E
- Country: Australia
- State: New South Wales
- Region: Hunter
- LGA: City of Cessnock
- Location: 154 km (96 mi) N of Sydney; 52 km (32 mi) W of Newcastle; 83 km (52 mi) NW of Gosford; 27 km (17 mi) SW of Maitland; 44 km (27 mi) SE of Singleton

Government
  - State electorates: Cessnock; Upper Hunter
  - Federal division: Hunter
- Elevation: 80 m (260 ft)

Population
  - Total: 23,211 (UCL 2021)
- Time zone: UTC+10 (AEST)
  - Summer (DST): UTC+11 (AEDT)
- Postcode: 2325
- County: Northumberland
- Parish: Cessnock
- Mean max temp: 24.6 °C (76.3 °F)
- Mean min temp: 11.1 °C (52.0 °F)
- Annual rainfall: 747.5 mm (29.43 in)

Cessnock (/ˈsɛsnɒk/) is a city in the Hunter Valley of New South Wales, Australia, about 52 km (32 mi) by road west of Newcastle. It is the administrative centre of the City of Cessnock LGA and was named after an 1826 grant of land called Cessnock Estate, which was owned by John Campbell. The local area was once known as "The Coalfields", and it is the gateway city to the vineyards of the Hunter Valley, which includes Pokolbin, Mount View, Lovedale, Broke, Rothbury, and Branxton.

== History ==
The Wonnarua people are the traditional owners of the Cessnock area. Many were killed or died as a result of European diseases after colonisation. Others were forced onto neighbouring tribal territory and killed. The city of Cessnock features many Indigenous place names including Congewai, Kurri Kurri, Laguna, Nulkaba and Wollombi.

Lying between Australia's earliest European settlements – Sydney, the Hawkesbury River and Newcastle, pastoralists commenced settlement of the land in the 1820s. Cessnock was named by Scottish settler John Campbell, after his grandfather's baronial Cessnock Castle in Galston, East Ayrshire, to reflect the aristocratic heritage and ambitions for this estate. The township of Cessnock developed from 1850, as a service centre at the junction of the Great North Road from Sydney to the Hunter Valley, with branches to Maitland and Singleton.

The establishment of the South Maitland coalfields generated extensive land settlement between 1903 and 1923. The current pattern of urban development, transport routes and industrial landscape was laid at this time. The surveying of the Greta coal seam by Professor Edgeworth David around 1888 became the impetus for considerable social and economic change in the area with the development of the coal mining industry.

== Demographics ==
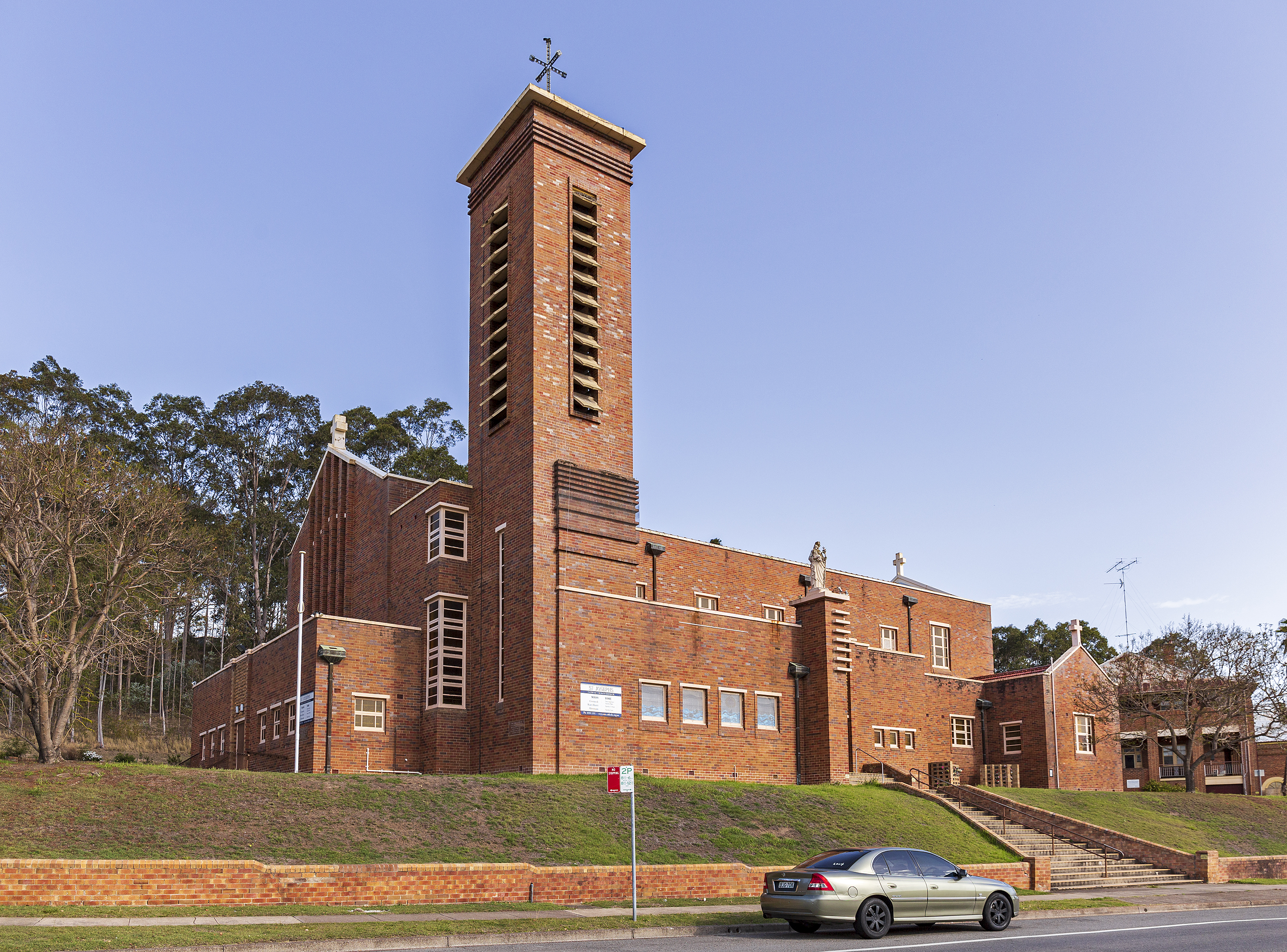
St Joseph's Catholic Church

According to the 2021 census, there were 63,632 people in the Cessnock LGA.

- Aboriginal and Torres Strait Islander people made up 10.2% of the population.
- 87.9% of people were born in Australia. The next most common countries of birth were England 1.9%, New Zealand 1.0% and Philippines 0.5%.
- 90.1% of people spoke only English at home.
- The most common responses for religion were No Religion 41.1%, Anglican 19.2% and Catholic 17.7%.

== Economy ==
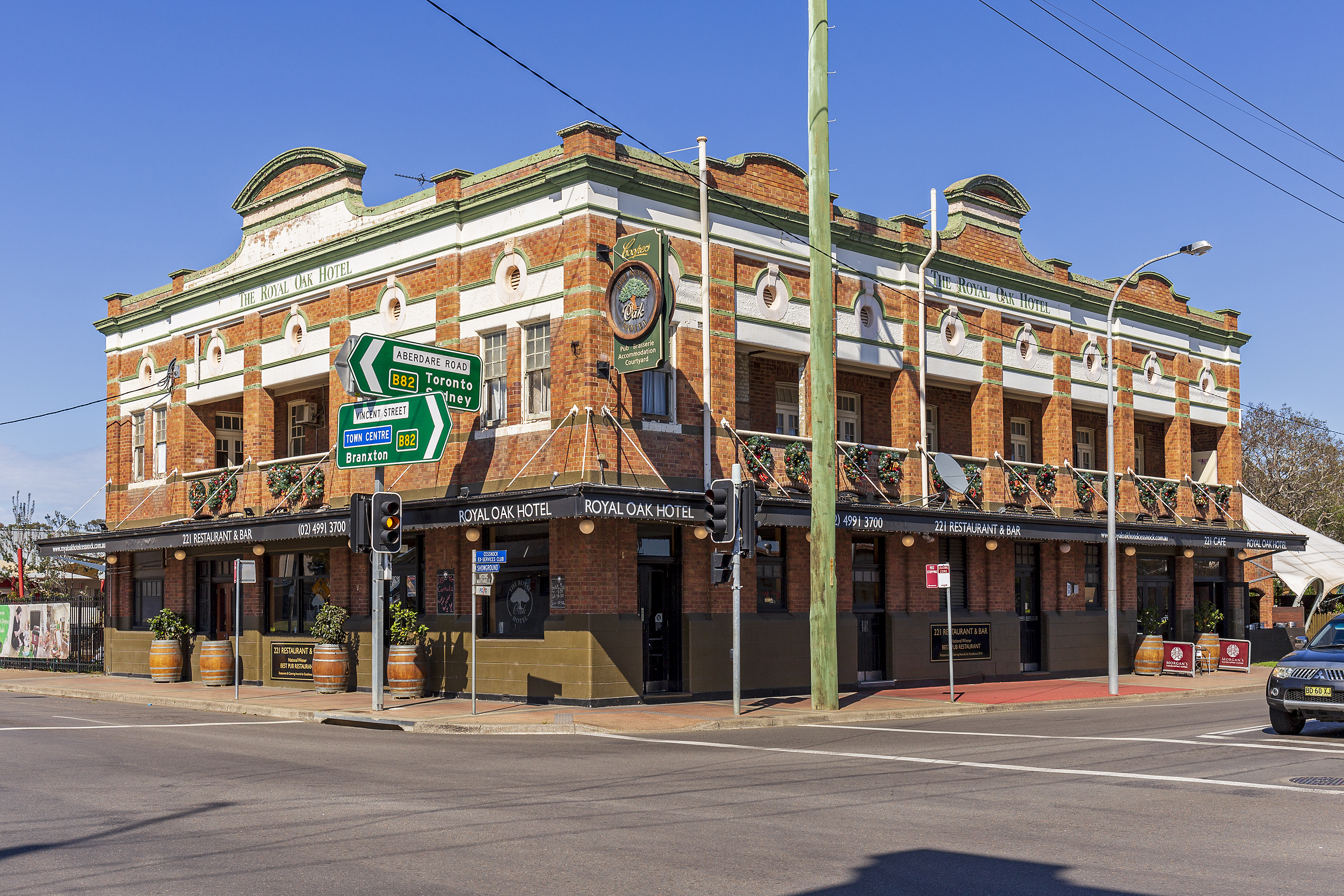
The Royal Oak Hotel

The decline of mining on the South Maitland Coalfields has been paralleled by growth in the wine industry and better access to other employment centres.

The Hunter Valley wine-growing area near Cessnock is Australia's oldest wine region and one of the most famous, with around 1,800 hectares (4,448 acres) under vine. The vineyards of Pokolbin, Mount View and Allandale, with their rich volcanic soils tended by entrepreneurial vignerons, are also the focus of a thriving and growing tourism industry. The extension and eventual completion of the F3 Freeway (now the M1 Motorway) created a property and tourism boom during the 1990s.

Cessnock has begun to develop other tourist ventures beyond the wine industry such as championship golf courses, hot air ballooning, sky-diving, and guest house accommodation.

The city council has actively pursued a policy of urban renewal in the city centre since 2001. The local council was one of the first to introduce a recycling program for waste disposal in the state.

Most employment comes from the local port city of Newcastle, the nearby major centres of Maitland and Singleton and in service industries in the local council area, which comprises many small towns, such as Kurri Kurri, Weston, Neath, Abernethy, Kearsley and Pokolbin.

== Geography ==
The town is located in the rich alluvial and volcanic soils of the Hunter Valley. Rich coal seams underlie much of the area. The Brokenback Range (part of the Great Dividing Range) rises to the west of the city. The Hunter River flows down the Hunter Valley approximately 20 km (12 mi) to the north. Cessnock lies within the Hunter Valley Important Bird Area.

=== Climate ===
Cessnock has a humid subtropical climate (Cfa) with hot summers and cool winters, similar to Penrith, a suburb in Greater Western Sydney to the south. Summers may be dry due to their inland location, but humid days are not uncommon. Winters are usually dry with cold nights, which may be frosty.

Climate data for Cessnock Airport (32º47'S, 151º20'E, 67 metres or 220 feet AMSL) (1994–2020 normals, extremes 1968–2024)
Month	Jan	Feb	Mar	Apr	May	Jun	Jul	Aug	Sep	Oct	Nov	Dec	Year
Record high °C (°F)	45.1 (113.2)	46.8 (116.2)	39.3 (102.7)	35.2 (95.4)	29.2 (84.6)	25.6 (78.1)	25.3 (77.5)	30.0 (86.0)	35.7 (96.3)	38.6 (101.5)	44.5 (112.1)	43.6 (110.5)	46.8 (116.2)
Mean daily maximum °C (°F)	30.6 (87.1)	29.6 (85.3)	27.4 (81.3)	24.3 (75.7)	20.9 (69.6)	17.9 (64.2)	17.6 (63.7)	19.5 (67.1)	22.8 (73.0)	25.4 (77.7)	27.3 (81.1)	29.1 (84.4)	24.4 (75.9)
Daily mean °C (°F)	24.0 (75.2)	23.4 (74.1)	21.2 (70.2)	17.6 (63.7)	14.2 (57.6)	11.9 (53.4)	10.9 (51.6)	12.0 (53.6)	15.1 (59.2)	17.7 (63.9)	20.3 (68.5)	22.3 (72.1)	17.6 (63.6)
Mean daily minimum °C (°F)	17.3 (63.1)	17.1 (62.8)	15.0 (59.0)	10.8 (51.4)	7.5 (45.5)	5.9 (42.6)	4.2 (39.6)	4.4 (39.9)	7.3 (45.1)	10.0 (50.0)	13.3 (55.9)	15.4 (59.7)	10.7 (51.2)
Record low °C (°F)	6.1 (43.0)	6.1 (43.0)	4.4 (39.9)	−1.2 (29.8)	−3.5 (25.7)	−4.3 (24.3)	−6.7 (19.9)	−4.9 (23.2)	−2.8 (27.0)	−0.6 (30.9)	2.8 (37.0)	2.8 (37.0)	−6.7 (19.9)
Average rainfall mm (inches)	71.1 (2.80)	99.0 (3.90)	76.8 (3.02)	56.1 (2.21)	40.0 (1.57)	61.2 (2.41)	32.4 (1.28)	31.4 (1.24)	43.7 (1.72)	53.1 (2.09)	71.5 (2.81)	75.1 (2.96)	709.9 (27.95)
Average rainy days (≥ 1.0 mm)	6.5	7.7	7.4	5.8	4.9	6.0	4.3	3.8	5.4	6.0	7.2	7.3	72.3
Average relative humidity (%)	46	53	53	52	53	55	50	41	42	44	47	46	49
Average dew point °C (°F)	14.6 (58.3)	16.3 (61.3)	14.7 (58.5)	11.6 (52.9)	8.9 (48.0)	7.2 (45.0)	5.3 (41.5)	4.1 (39.4)	6.4 (43.5)	8.6 (47.5)	11.6 (52.9)	13.3 (55.9)	10.2 (50.4)
Source: Australian Bureau of Meteorology (1991–2020 normals, extremes 1968–2024)

Historical population
Year	Pop.	±%
1933	14,385	—
1947	13,029	−9.4%
1954	14,417	+10.7%
1961	13,833	−4.1%
1966	15,332	+10.8%
1971	16,160	+5.4%
1976	16,256	+0.6%
1981	16,916	+4.1%
1986	17,506	+3.5%
1991	17,932	+2.4%
1996	17,540	−2.2%
2001	17,791	+1.4%
2006	18,316	+3.0%
2011	20,013	+9.3%
2016	21,725	+8.6%
2021	23,211	+6.8%
Source: Australian Bureau of Statistics data.

== Education ==
Primary schools

- St Philip's Christian College
- Cessnock Public School
- Nulkaba Public School
- Cessnock East Public School
- Bellbird Public School
- Cessnock West Public School
- Kearsley Public School
- St Patricks Primary School

High schools

- Cessnock High School
- Mount View High School
- St Phillips Christian College

Tertiary facilities

- Hunter Institute of TAFE – Cessnock Campus

== Media ==
Cessnock is serviced by a number of regional newspapers, radio stations and television stations.

=== Print ===
- The Cessnock Advertiser; an adjunct to the Mercury and is published every Wednesday. It has a circulation of approximately 17,000
- Maitland Mercury
- Newcastle Herald

=== Radio ===
==== AM stations ====
- 2HD (commercial)
- ABC Newcastle
- 2HRN (off band commercial)
- Sky Sports Radio (as part of statewide network)

==== FM stations ====
- KOFM 102.9 FM (commercial)
- Hit106.9 Newcastle 106.9 FM (commercial)
- New FM 105.3 FM (commercial)
- 2NUR 103.7 FM (community)
- 2CHR (Central Hunter Radio) 96.5 FM – (community)
- Rhema FM Newcastle 99.7FM (Christian)

==== Television ====
All major television channels are available in Cessnock. The networks and the channels they broadcast are listed as follows:

- Seven (formerly Prime7 and Prime Television), 7two, 7mate, 7Bravo, 7flix. Seven Network owned and operated station channels.
- Nine (NBN), 9Go!, 9Gem and 9Life. Nine Network owned and operated station channels.
- 10, 10 Drama, 10 Comedy and Nickelodeon. Network 10 owned and operated station channels.
- ABC, ABC Family, ABC Kids, ABC Entertains and ABC News, part of the Australian Broadcasting Corporation.
- SBS, SBS2, SBS World Movies, SBS WorldWatch, SBS Food and NITV, part of the Special Broadcasting Service.

Of the three main commercial networks:

- The Seven Network airs a half-hour local Seven News bulletin for the Hunter Region at 6 pm each weeknight. It is broadcast from studios in Canberra with reporters based at a local newsroom in the city.
- Nine airs NBN News, a regional half-hour long program including opt-outs for the Mid North Coast, every weeknight at 5:30 pm. It is broadcast from studios in Newcastle with reporters based at a local newsroom in the city.

=== Digital Media ===
Cessnock was featured in national tech news in 2020 with the release of a video game called Cessnock.Life, which is a fictional simulation game based about Cessnock. The domain for Cessnock.life has expired and no longer is playable via the website.

=== Performance Arts Culture Cessnock (PACC) ===
The PACC is a Local Government owned theatre that holds concerts, plays and community events. Originally opened in 2008 and known as the Cessnock Performing Arts Centre it frequently has acts shows such as comedians, tribute bands and musicals, as well as other events such as drama lessons.

== Sport ==
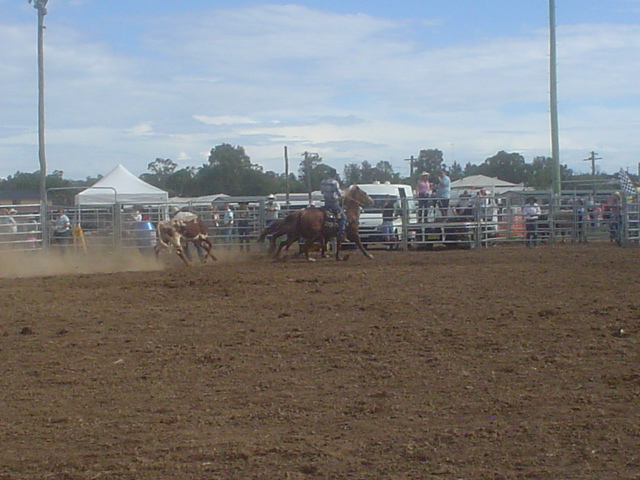
Rodeo at Cessnock showground

The city has many sporting facilities. The city competes in several regional sporting competitions, particularly the Cessnock Goannas competing in Newcastle-based rugby league competition. Some very successful sporting players can trace their roots to the local district, including Australian Rugby League representative players and brothers Andrew and Matthew Johns. World-renowned golfer and TV commentator Jack Newton is also from Cessnock. His annual Sub-Juniors Golf Tournament has unearthed some talented young golfers and is held on the local championship courses of Pokolbin. Cessnock was the base camp for the Japan national football team during the 2015 AFC Asian Cup.

== Transport ==
For a century Cessnock was served by the South Maitland Railway network, originally constructed for the coal industry, but which at one time had considerable passenger services terminating at Cessnock railway station, including a direct train to Sydney known as the Cessnock Flyer.

The Sydney–Newcastle Freeway's Cessnock exit at Freemans Waterhole provides one of the main road connections from Sydney to Cessnock via The Gap, a pass through the Watagan Mountains range just north of Mount Heaton.

Until the Hunter Expressway opened in 2014, linking the New England Highway at Branxton and the Sydney–Newcastle Freeway at West Wallsend, through traffic passed through Cessnock.

The local airport is placed just to the north of the city, at the entrance to the Vineyard District. It has a small public passenger terminal and also serves as the base for aviation training organisations such as Avondale College's school of Aviation and Hunter Valley Aviation. The airport is not served by RPT flights. Access by air to the region is by Newcastle Airport at Williamtown, 53 km (33 mi) away.

The local bus service is run by Rover Coaches which provide services to Maitland, Newcastle and Morisset and school bus services.

== Notable people ==
- Douglas N. Daft, businessman; CEO of Coca-Cola (2000–2004), and Corporate Director of Wal-Mart
- Joel Edwards, rugby league player
- Andrew Johns, rugby league player
- Matthew Johns, rugby league player
- Gavin King, journalist; newspaper columnist
- Bruce Litchfield, architect
- Kenneth Neate, opera singer
- Jack Newton, professional golfer
- Bill Peden, rugby league player
- Frank Rickwood, President of BP Alaska, Chairman of Oil Search
- Don Schofield, Rugby League Player
- Simon Whitlock, Professional Darts Player
- Rod McCormack, Multi Time National Guitar and Banjo Champion, Australian Musician of the Year,
- Jeff McCormack, Multi Golden Guitar winner, Australian Musician of the Year

== National Estate ==
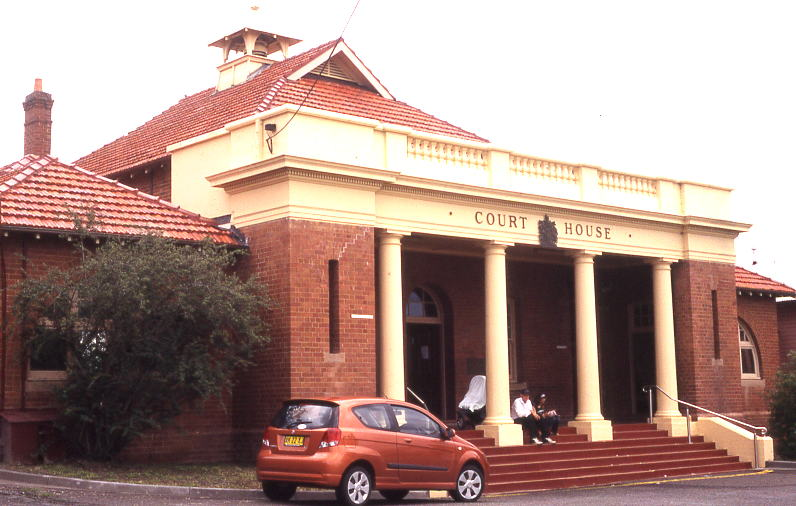
Cessnock Court House, Maitland Road, designed by Government Architect George McRae

Greater Cessnock contains a number of buildings and sites that are on the Register of the National Estate.

- Court House, Branxton
- Police Station and Residence, Branxton
- Former Court House, Greta
- Kurri Kurri Hotel, Lang and Hampden Streets, Kurri Kurri
- Richmond Main Colliery, Mulbring Rd, Pelaw Main
- Laguna House, Laguna
- Post Office, Wollombi
- Endeavour Museum (former Court House), Wollombi
- Public School, Wollombi
- St Michael's Catholic Church, Wollombi
- St John the Evangelist Anglican Church, Wollombi
- Stanford Main No.2 Colliery Pit Head Building, Brick Cottages
- Aboriginal Rock Carvings Site, popularly known as Baiame Cave, Milbrodale Area

== Crime ==
In 2021, Cessnock had an amphetamine use/possession rate of 137.1 per 100,000, which is significantly higher than the NSW state average of '90.0 per 100,000.

The suburb of Cessnock had an assault incidents crime rate of 1264.6 per 100,000 people in 2019, which is significantly higher than the NSW state average of 822.3 during the same period.

On 13 April 2026, a BearCat APC, along with heavily armed officers arrived outside a unit complex around 16:00 AEST, with reports of an undergoing siege taking place. Police were called to the unit when claims said that a man broke inside an apartment unit and was threatening a female resident inside with an object, likely a gun. The unnamed 34 year old man was arrested at 16:30 when multiple heavily armed officers entered the unit. The man was arrested for contravene an AVO, using the internet to harass or offend whilst armed with a dangerous weapon with the intent of bodily harm.

== See also ==
- Cessnock Correctional Centre
- City of Cessnock
- Electoral District of Cessnock
