= Transport Heritage NSW =

Australian organisation

- Predecessor: NSW Rail Transport Museum; Trainworks; Office of Rail Heritage
- Founded: 2013
- Type: Not-for-profit organisation
- Headquarters: Powerhouse Museum, Harris Street, Ultimo
- Location: Sydney, New South Wales, Australia
- Chairman: Nathan Rees
- Key people: Andrew Moritz (CEO)
- Website: thnsw.com.au

Transport Heritage NSW (THNSW) is a body established by the Government of New South Wales to manage the state's rail heritage collection and provide support to the broader transport (bus, tram, rail) heritage sector in NSW.

It operates the NSW Rail Museum (Thirlmere) and Valley Heights Rail Museum.

== History ==
In May 2013, Minister for Transport Gladys Berejiklian acknowledged the importance of steam locomotive 3801, stating it would be a priority of the new Transport Heritage NSW to return it to service.

On 10 December 2013, a majority of the members of the New South Wales Rail Transport Museum voted in support of the creation of Transport Heritage NSW. Other transport heritage groups also expressed concern for their future existence. Peter Lowry was appointed as chairperson of the board and the nominated chief executive of Transport Heritage NSW, Andrew Killingsworth has been seen as a political appointment.

In February 2016, Andrew Moritz was appointed as the new chief executive following the resignation of Andrew Killingsworth. On 1 March 2017, Rob Mason, former chief executive of RailCorp was appointed as the new chairman of the board, replacing Peter Lowry.

In November 2018, plans were announced to move Transport Heritage NSW items currently stored at Eveleigh Railway Workshops and Broadmeadow Locomotive Depot to a secure undercover storage facility in part of the Chullora Railway Workshops to be known as the Chullora Heritage Hub.

In August 2022, former New South Wales premier Nathan Rees was appointed as the new chair of the board, replacing Rob Mason.

All locomotives and rolling stock formerly owned by the New South Wales Rail Transport Museum are now owned by THNSW.

== Museums ==
- NSW Rail Museum, Thirlmere
- Valley Heights Locomotive Depot Heritage Museum

== Awards ==
- Winner National Trust (NSW) Heritage Awards 2016 'Events & Exhibitions' category for 2015 Transport Heritage Expo
- Winner National Trust (NSW) Heritage Awards 2022 'Events & Exhibitions' category for 2021 Locomotive 3801 Relaunch Events Program

== Events ==
Transport Heritage NSW operates an annual program of events, including heritage train experiences across the state of New South Wales.

Notable events include the Thirlmere Festival of Steam in partnership with Wollondilly Shire Council, and the Transport Heritage Expo at Central station over the King's Birthday October long weekend.

It also runs the Blue Mountains Steam FunFest at Valley Heights in partnership with the Valley Heights Steam Tramway.

It is also involved in the organisation of the Hunter Valley Steamfest.

== Collection ==
All assets previously owned by the NSW Rail Transport Museum are in the collection.

=== Steam locomotives ===
Steam Locomotives
No	Description	Manufacturer	Year	Location	Status	Ref
1021	0-4-0T saddle tank	Manning Wardle	1896	Thirlmere	static exhibit	Locomotive, Steam 1021
1033	2-4-0T passenger tank	Beyer, Peacock & Company	1885	Thirlmere	static exhibit	Locomotive, Steam 1033
1034	0-4-0T 4T crane	Dübs & Company	1886	Thirlmere	static exhibit	Locomotive, Steam 1034
1064	0-4-0 3T coal grab	Alfred Harmon, Melbourne	1918	Thirlmere	operational	Locomotive, Steam 1064
1219	4-4-0 passenger	Dübs & Company	1879	Chullora	stored	Locomotive, Steam 1219
1301	4-4-2T passenger	Beyer, Peacock & Company	1877	Thirlmere	static exhibit	Locomotive, Steam 1301
1308	4-4-2T passenger	Beyer, Peacock & Company	1877	Valley Heights	undergoing restoration	Locomotive, Steam 1307
1709	4-4-0 passenger	Vulcan Foundry	1887	Thirlmere	static exhibit	Locomotive, Steam 1709
1803	0-6-0T passenger	Vulcan Foundry	1884	Thirlmere	Thomas the Tank Engine	Locomotive, Steam 1803
1905	0-6-0T goods	Beyer, Peacock & Company	1877	Thirlmere	static exhibit	Locomotive, Steam 1905
2029	2-6-4T passenger	Eveleigh Railway Workshops	1911	Thirlmere	static exhibit	Locomotive, Steam 2029
2419	2-6-0 goods	Dübs & Company	1891	Goulburn Roundhouse	static exhibit	Locomotive, Steam 2419
2510	2-6-0 goods	Beyer, Peacock & Company	1882	Thirlmere	static exhibit	Locomotive, Steam 2510
2606	2-6-2ST mixed traffic	Dübs & Company	1891	Chullora	stored	Locomotive, Steam 2606
2705	2-6-0 mixed traffic	Hunslet Engine Company	1913	Thirlmere	operational	Locomotive, Steam 2705
3001	4-6-0 mixed traffic	Beyer, Peacock & Company	1903	Thirlmere	operational	Locomotive, Steam 3001
3137	4-6-4T passenger	Eveleigh Railway Workshops	1916	Thirlmere	static exhibit	Locomotive, Steam 3137
3203	4-6-0 passenger	Beyer, Peacock & Company	1891	Cooma Monaro Railway	stored	Locomotive, Steam 3203
3214	4-6-0 passenger	Beyer, Peacock & Company	1891	Valley Heights	static exhibit
3526	4-6-0 passenger	Eveleigh Railway Workshops	1917	Thirlmere	operational	Locomotive, Steam 3526
3609	4-6-0 passenger	Eveleigh Railway Workshops	1928	Junee	static exhibit	Locomotive, Steam 3609
3616	4-6-0 passenger	Eveleigh Railway Workshops	1928	Thirlmere	stored
3642	4-6-0 passenger	Clyde Engineering	1926	Thirlmere	operational	Locomotive, Steam 3642
3801	4-6-2 express passenger	Clyde Engineering	1943	Thirlmere	operational	Locomotive, Steam 3801
3820	4-6-2 express passenger	Eveleigh Railway Workshops	1947	Thirlmere	static exhibit	Locomotive, Steam 3820
5096	2-8-0 goods	Clyde Engineering	1907	Chullora	stored	Locomotive, Steam 5096
5461	2-8-0 goods	Clyde Engineering	1915	Valley Heights	static exhibit	Locomotive, Steam 5461
5595	2-8-0 goods	Clyde Engineering	1912	Thirlmere	static exhibit	Locomotive, Steam 5595
5711	4-8-2 goods	Clyde Engineering	1929	Valley Heights	static exhibit	Locomotive, Steam 5711
5908	2-8-2 goods	Baldwin Locomotive Works	1952	Goulburn Roundhouse	static exhibit	Locomotive, Steam 5908
5910	2-8-2 goods	Baldwin Locomotive Works	1952	Thirlmere	static exhibit	Locomotive, Steam 5910
5916	2-8-2 goods	Baldwin Locomotive Works	1952	Goulburn Roundhouse	Stored
6029	4-8-4+4-8-4 goods	Beyer, Peacock & Company	1954	Thirlmere	operating exhibit
6040	4-8-4+4-8-4 goods	Beyer, Peacock & Company	1956	Thirlmere	static exhibit	Locomotive, Steam 6040
18	0-6-0 mixed traffic	Robert Stephenson & Company	1865	Thirlmere	static exhibit
78	0-4-2 mixed traffic	Eveleigh Railway Workshops	1877	Thirlmere	static exhibit	Locomotive, Steam 78
PWD 79	0-6-0 Saddle Tank	Hunslet Engine Company	1938	Thirlmere	static exhibit	Locomotive, Steam PWD79
20N	0-6-0 ST mixed traffic	Kitson & Company	1870	Newcastle Museum	static exhibit	long-term loan .
Jack	0-4-0T	Krauss-Maffei	1908	Lake Macquarie Light Rail	operational	leased
John Lysaght "Kathleen"	0-4-0 Saddle Tank	Avonside Engine Company	1921	Richmond Vale Railway Museum	undergoing restoration	long-term loan
J & A Brown No.5 "The Major"	0-6-4 Side Tank	Beyer, Peacock & Company	1885	Thirlmere	stored
Australian Iron & Steel No.2 "Bronzewing"	0-6-0 Saddle Tank	Clyde Engineering	1938	Thirlmere	static exhibit
John Lysaght "Alison"	0-4-0 Saddle Tank	Andrew Barclay Sons & Company	1923	Richmond Vale Railway Museum	static exhibit	long-term loan

=== Diesel locomotives ===
Diesel locomotives
No	Class	Manufacturer	Year	Location	Status	Notes
4001	40 class	Montreal Locomotive Works	1940	Thirlmere, NSW	Operational	
4102	41 class	British Thomson-Houston	1953	Chullora, NSW	Stored	Last ran in 1987
4201	42 class	Clyde Engineering	1955	Thirlmere, NSW	Operational	
4306	43 class	A Goninan & Co	1957	Thirlmere, NSW	Operational	
4401	44 class	AE Goodwin	1957	Junee, NSW	Static display	
4403	44 class	AE Goodwin	1957	Thirlmere, NSW	Operational	
4464	44 class	AE Goodwin	1966	Thirlmere, NSW	Operational	
4486	44 class	AE Goodwin	1967	Thirlmere, NSW	Operational	
4490	44 class	AE Goodwin	1967	Thirlmere, NSW	Operational	
44211	442 class	Clyde Engineering	1971	Thirlmere, NSW	Stored	
44226	442 class	Clyde Engineering	1972	Junee, NSW	Operational	
4501	45 class	AE Goodwin	1962	Thirlmere, NSW	Operational	
4520	45 class	AE Goodwin	1963	Thirlmere, NSW	Operational	
4803	48 class	AE Goodwin	1959	Thirlmere, NSW	Operational	
4807	48 class	AE Goodwin	1959	Thirlmere, NSW	Operational	
4808	48 class	AE Goodwin	1959	Thirlmere, NSW	Operational	
4916	49 class	Clyde Engineering	1960	Thirlmere, NSW	Operational	
7344	73 class	Walkers Limited	1972	Paterson, NSW	Operational	
7350	73 class	Walkers Limited	1973	Thirlmere, NSW	Operational	
X101	X100 class	Chullora Railway Workshops	1962	Redfern, NSW	Stored	Part of the collection of Historic Electric Traction (HET)
X206	X200 class	Chullora Railway Workshops	1963	Valley Heights, NSW	Operational	
D1	BHP Port Kembla D1 class	Commonwealth Engineering	1950	Thirlmere, NSW	Operational	

=== Diesel railcars ===
Numbers	Class	Location	Status	Notes
CPH 3	CPH	Thirlmere, NSW	Operational	
CPH 13	CPH	Thirlmere, NSW	Operational	
CPH 18	CPH	Thirlmere, NSW	Operational	Dressed as Toby the Tram Engine on Day Out with Thomas Events
623/723	620/720	Thirlmere, NSW	Under overhaul	

=== Electric locomotives ===
Number	Class	Location	Status	
4601	46 Class	Valley Heights, NSW	Static display	
4638	46 Class	Chullora, NSW	Stored	
7100 (ex. 4501)	71 Class	Chullora, NSW	Stored	First electric locomotive in New South Wales
8646	86 Class	Thirlmere, NSW	Static display	

=== Electric multiple units ===
Electric Multiple Units
Number	Class	Location	Status	Notes
C3001	S set motor car	Redfern, NSW	Stored	First S set motor car built by A Goninan & co.
C3045 (ex. EBB2112)	Wooden motor car	Thirlmere, NSW	Static display	
C3102 (ex. EFA2258)	Standard motor car	Redfern, NSW	Under restoration	
C3218 (ex. N3640)	Standard motor car	Flemington, NSW	Operational	Used in set F1
C7396 (ex. C3396)	Standard motor car	Flemington, NSW	Operational	Used in set F1
C3426	Standard motor car	Flemington, NSW	Operational	Used in set F1
C3653 (ex. C3903)	Parcel van	Redfern, NSW	Under restoration	
C7485 (ex. C3485)	Tulloch motor car	Redfern, NSW	Under restoration	
C3702	W set motor car	Flemington, NSW	Operational	Awaiting certification in set W3
C3708	W set motor car	Flemington, NSW	Operational	Awaiting certification in set W3
C3765	S set motor car	Flemington, NSW	Operational	Used in set S28, last suburban motor car built by Commonwealth Engineering
C3804	Tulloch double deck motor car	Thirlmere, NSW	Static display	
C3805	S set motor car	Redfern, NSW	Under restoration	
C3986	S set motor car	Flemington, NSW	Operational	Used in set S28, series 3 S set motor car built by Commonwealth Engineering
CF5015	U set motor car	Redfern, NSW	Under restoration	
CF5017	U set motor car	Redfern, NSW	Under restoration	
CF5035	U set motor car	Redfern, NSW	Under restoration	
ETB6029	U set first class trailer car	Redfern, NSW	Under restoration	
ETB6039	U set first class trailer car	Valley Heights, NSW	Static display	
T4013 (ex, D4013)	S set driving trailer car	Flemington, NSW	Operational	Used in set S28
T4050 (ex, D4050)	S set driving trailer car	Flemington, NSW	Operational	Used in set S28
T4101	S set trailer car	Redfern, NSW	Under restoration	
T4150	S set trailer car	Redfern, NSW	Under restoration	
T4279 (ex. FA888)	wooden trailer car	Redfern, NSW	Under restoration	
T4310	Standard trailer car	Thirlmere, NSW	Static display	
T4527	Standard trailer car	Flemington, NSW	Operational	Used in set F1
T4554	Tulloch trailer car	Redfern, NSW	Under restoration	
T4790	Sputnik trailer car	Redfern, NSW	Under restoration	
T4801	Tulloch double deck trailer car	Flemington, NSW	Operational	Awaiting certification in set W3
T4814	Tulloch double deck trailer car	Flemington, NSW	Operational	Awaiting certification in set W3
T4961	S set trailer car	Redfern, NSW	Under restoration	
D4052 (ex. T4547)	Standard driving trailer	Redfern, NSW	Under restoration	
TF6013	U set second class trailer car	Redfern, NSW	Under restoration	

Locomotives not owned by THNSW:

- 3265 (Operational, Thirlmere) – Powerhouse Museum
- 3830 (Stored, Thirlmere) – Powerhouse Museum (awaiting restoration)

== Publications ==
Since December 1962, Transport Heritage NSW has published the magazine Roundhouse.
