= New South Wales X10 class locomotive =

Class of steam locomotive operated in New South Wales, Australia

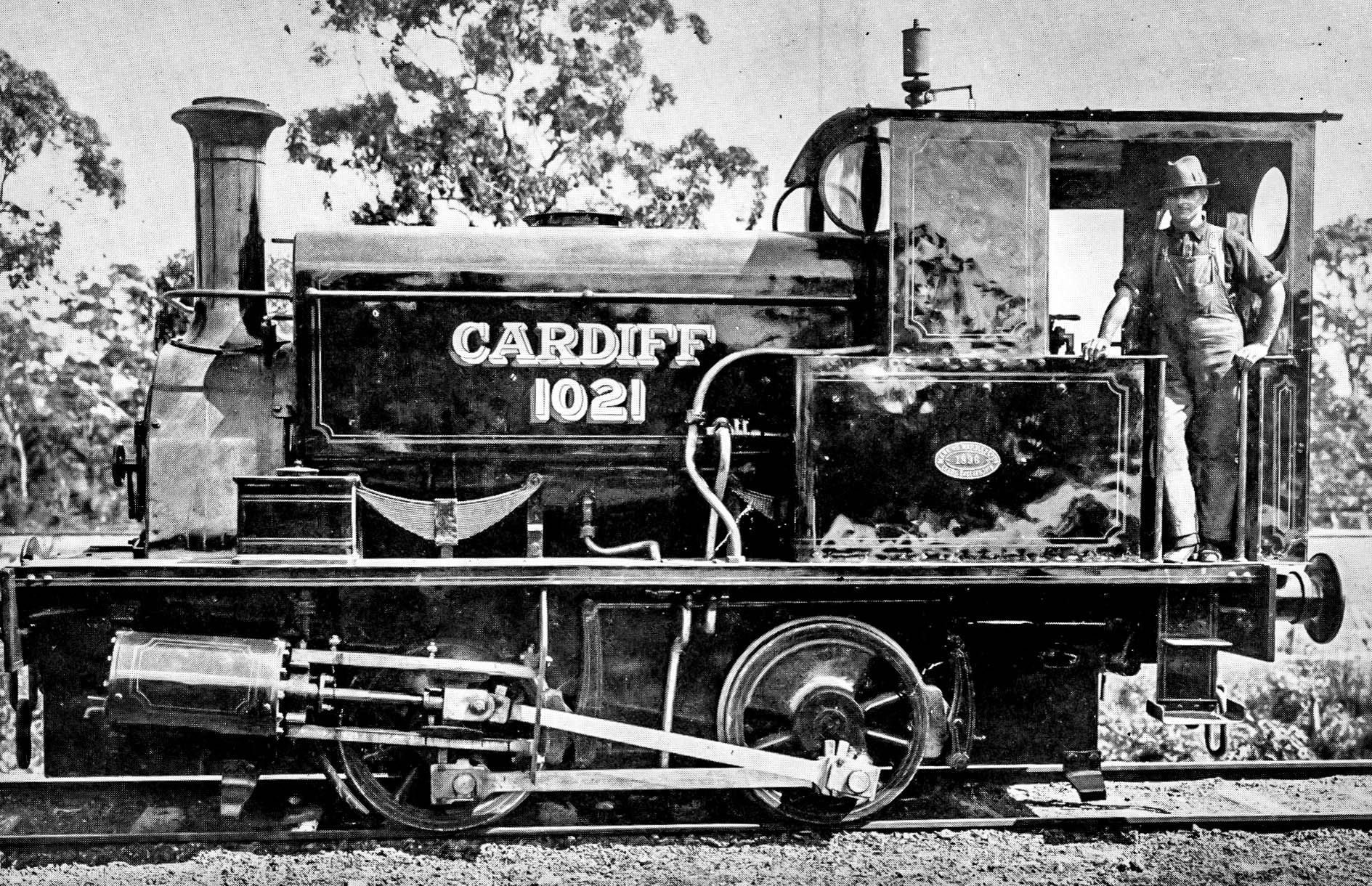
Locomotive Depot Shunter 1021 (former No. 59)

The X10 class is a class of steam locomotives previously operated by the New South Wales Government Railways of Australia.

== History ==
When the NSWGR steam locomotive classification was renumbered in 1924, a number of smaller classes, including small 0-4-0 and 2-4-0 tank locomotives, all types of duplicates, yard and depot locomotives, crane locomotives, locomotive and accident cranes and special equipment were classified as the X10 class. Many were purchased from other government agencies and private lines. As such, this was an extremely diverse group of locomotives.

Included were the 18 members of the F.351 class and eight members of M.36 class.

== Locomotives ==
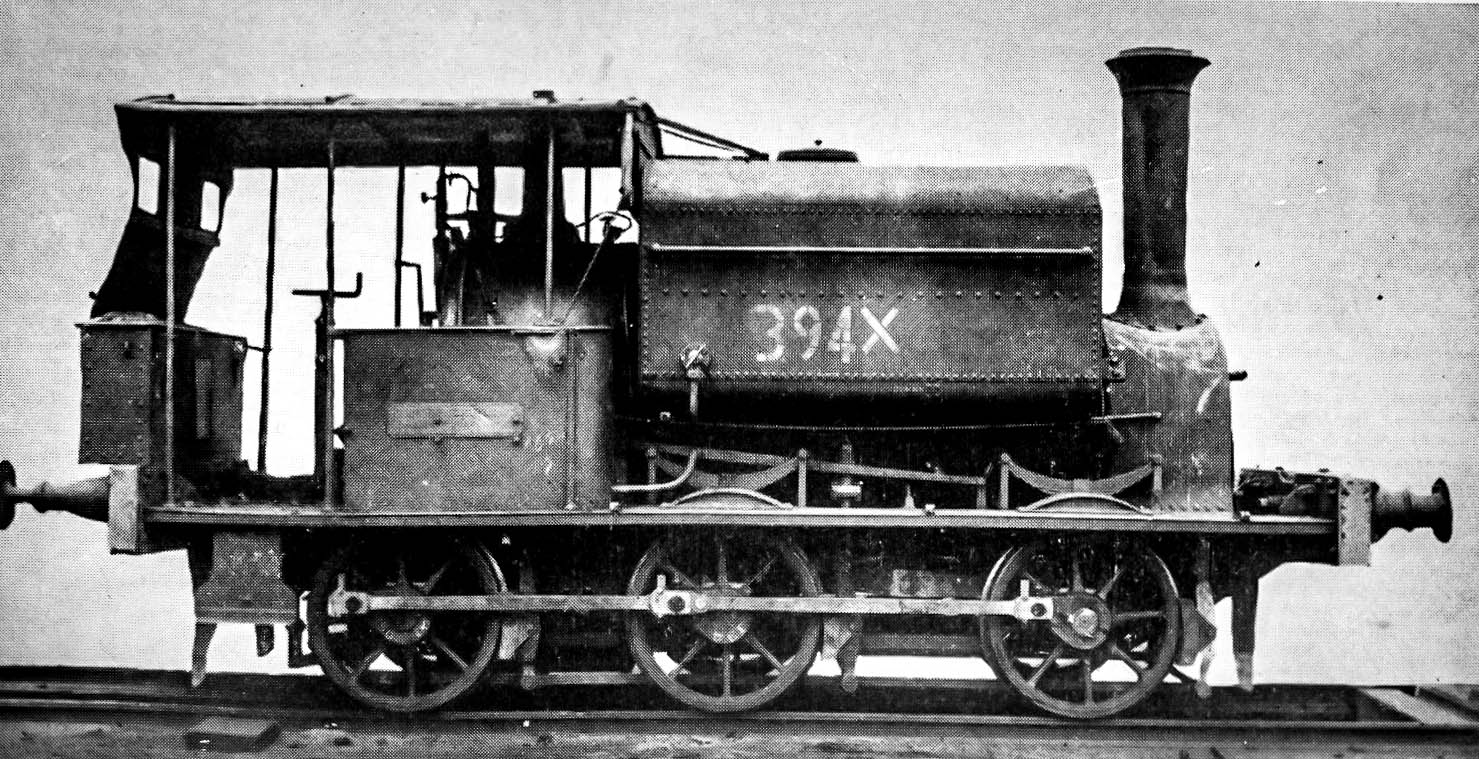
Locomotive 1001 (former 394X)

| Number | Type | Built | Builder | Builder's no. | Pre 1924 No(s) | Fate |
|---|---|---|---|---|---|---|
| 1001 | 0-6-0ST | 1861 | Manning Wardle | 32 | 9N, S29 & 394X | scrapped 1929 |
| 1002 | 0-6-0 | 1866 | Robert Stephenson & Company | 1549 | E22 | scrapped 1929 |
| 1003 | 0-6-0 | 1871 | Vale & Lacy | 6 | E41 | scrapped 1927 |
| 1004 | 0-4-2 | 1877 | NSWGR | - | M78 | preserved Transport Heritage NSW |
| 1005 | 2-8-0 | 1879 | Baldwin Locomotive Works | 4414 | J132 | scrapped 1937 |
| 1006 | 2-8-0 | 1879 | Baldwin Locomotive Works | 4526 | J134 | scrapped 1937 |
| 1007 | 2-8-0 | 1879 | Baldwin Locomotive Works | 4529 | J138 | scrapped 1937 |
| 1008 | 2-8-0 | 1879 | Baldwin Locomotive Works | 4530 | J138 | scrapped 1927 |
| 1009 | 2-8-0 | 1879 | Baldwin Locomotive Works | 4533 | J140 | scrapped 1937 |
| 1010 | 0-6-0 | 1882 | Henry Vale | 18 | A193 | scrapped 1937 |
| 1011 | 2-6-0 | 1885 | Baldwin Locomotive Works | 7387 | K294 | scrapped 1928 |
| 1012 | 2-6-0 | 1885 | Baldwin Locomotive Works | 7389 | K296 | scrapped 1926 |
| 1013 | 2-6-0 | 1885 | Baldwin Locomotive Works | 7390 | K297 | scrapped 1929 |
| 1014 | 2-6-0 | 1885 | Baldwin Locomotive Works | 7391 | K298 | scrapped 1929 |
| 1015 | 2-6-0 | 1885 | Baldwin Locomotive Works | 7392 | K299 | scrapped 1926 |
| 1016 | 2-6-0 | 1885 | Baldwin Locomotive Works | 7394 | K300 | scrapped 1926 |
| 1017 | 2-6-0 | 1885 | Baldwin Locomotive Works | 7395 | K301 | scrapped 1926 |
| 1018 | 2-6-0 | 1885 | Baldwin Locomotive Works | 7396 | K302 | scrapped 1926 |
| 1019 | 2-6-0 | 1885 | Baldwin Locomotive Works | 7397 | K303 | scrapped 1926 |
| 1020 | 2-8-0 | 1893 | NSWGR | - | J522 | scrapped 1930 |
| 1021 | 0-4-0ST | 1916 | Manning Wardle | 1896 | 1212 ex NSWPWD | preserved Transport Heritage NSW |
| 1022 | 0-4-0ST | 1916 | Vulcan Iron Works | 2505 | 1217 ex NSWPWD | preserved Valley Heights Steam Tramway |
| 1023 | 0-4-0ST | 1916 | Vulcan Iron Works | 2518 | 1218 ex NSWPWD | scrapped 1968 |
| 1024 | 0-4-0T | 1918 | Krauss | 2179 | Ex PWD23, Lo43 | 2 ft gauge - sold 1936 & converted to petrol preserved Illawarra Light Railway Museum |
| 1025 | 0-6-0T | 1875 | Mort & Co. | 16 | N68, Lo14 | scrapped 1937 |
| 1026 | 0-6-0T | 1875 | Vale & Lacy | - | N72, Lo15 | scrapped 1938 |
| 1031 | 2-4-0T | 1885 | Beyer, Peacock & Company | 2657 | F351, Lo19 | scrapped 1931 |
| 1032 | 2-4-0T | 1885 | Beyer, Peacock & Company | 2658 | F352, Lo20 | sold 1927 |
| 1033 | 2-4-0T | 1885 | Beyer, Peacock & Company | 2661 | F355, Lo21 | preserved Transport Heritage NSW |
| 1035 | 2-4-0T | 1886 | Beyer, Peacock & Company | 2664 | F358, Lo22 | scrapped 1926 |
| 1036 | 2-4-0T | 1886 | Beyer, Peacock & Company | 2665 | F359, Lo23 | scrapped 1966 |
| 1037 | 2-4-0T | 1886 | Beyer, Peacock & Company | 2668 | F362, Lo24 | scrapped 1927 |
| 1039 | 2-4-0T | 1887 | Henry Vale | 37 | F364, Lo25 | scrapped 1929 |
| 1040 | 2-4-0T | 1887 | Henry Vale | 41 | F368, Lo26 | Sold Bulli Colliery 1929 |
| 1041 | 2-4-0T | 1887 | Henry Vale | 39 | F366, Lo27 | scrapped 1937 |
| 1042 | 2-4-0T | 1887 | Henry Vale | 38 | F365, Lo28 | preserved Maitland |
| 1043 | 2-4-0T | 1887 | Henry Vale | 40 | F367, Lo29 | sold 1928 |
| 1065 | 0-4-0 petrol | 1920 | Simplex | 2023 | Lo44 | scrapped 1964 |
| 1076 | 0-6-0T | 1885 | Vulcan Foundry | 995 | R288, 1804 | preserved Goulburn Rail Heritage Centre |
| 1077 | 0-6-0T | 1885 | Vulcan Foundry | 994 | R287, 1803 | preserved Transport Heritage NSW |
| 1078 | 0-6-0T | 1885 | Vulcan Foundry | 992 | R285, 1801 | sold 1957 |

== Breakdown Cranes ==
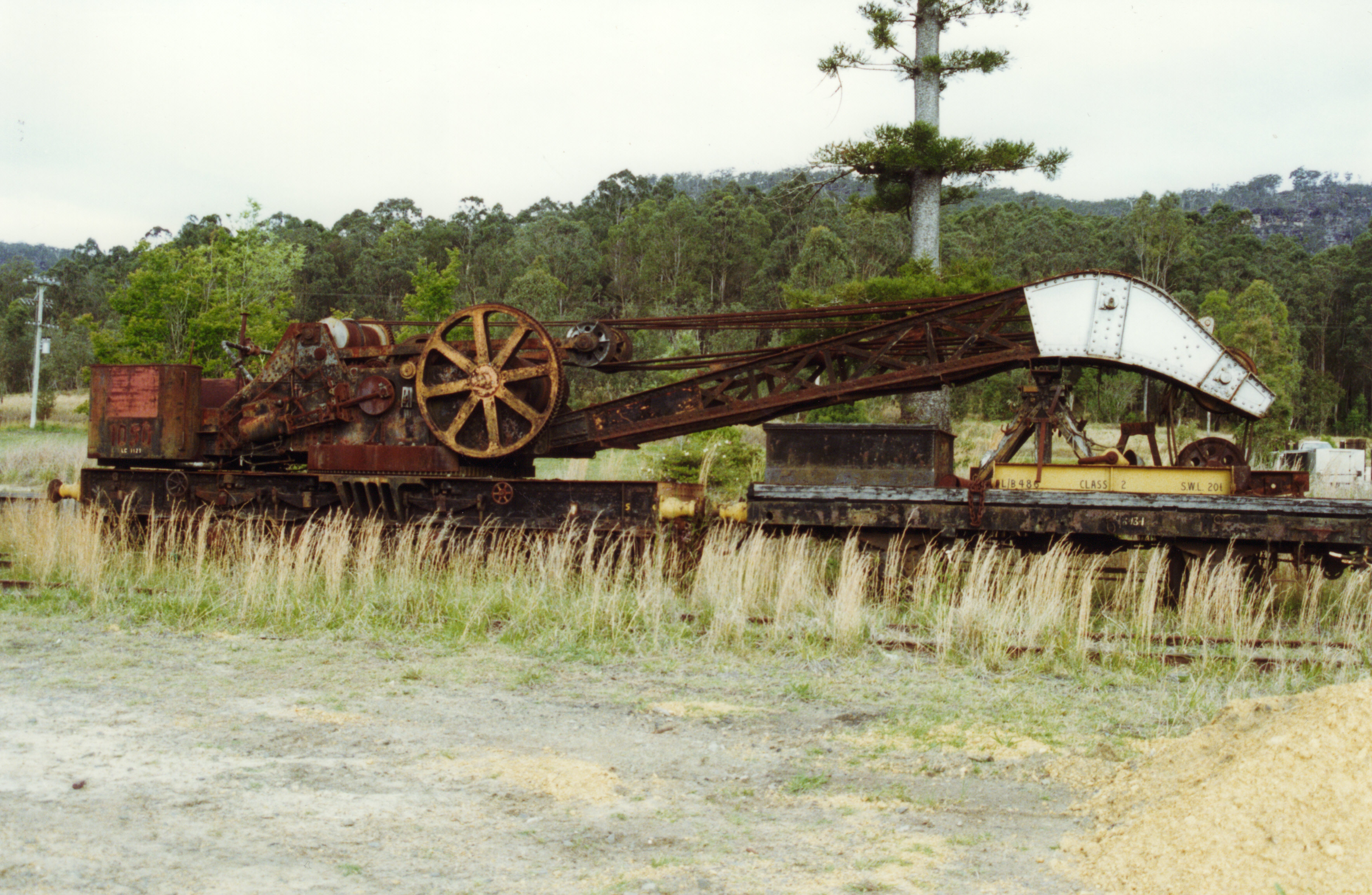
1050 at Genreagh

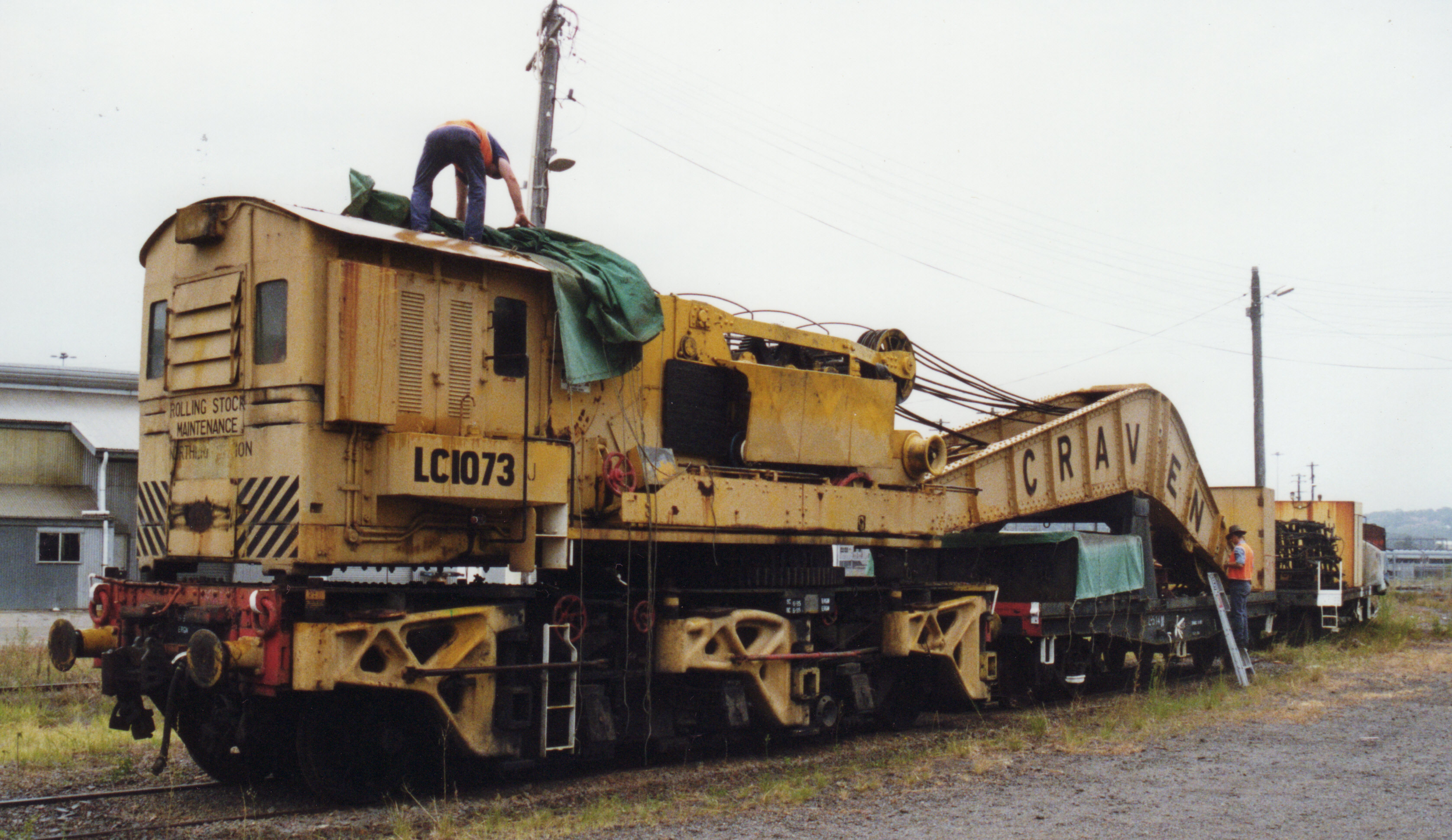
1073 at Broadmeadow

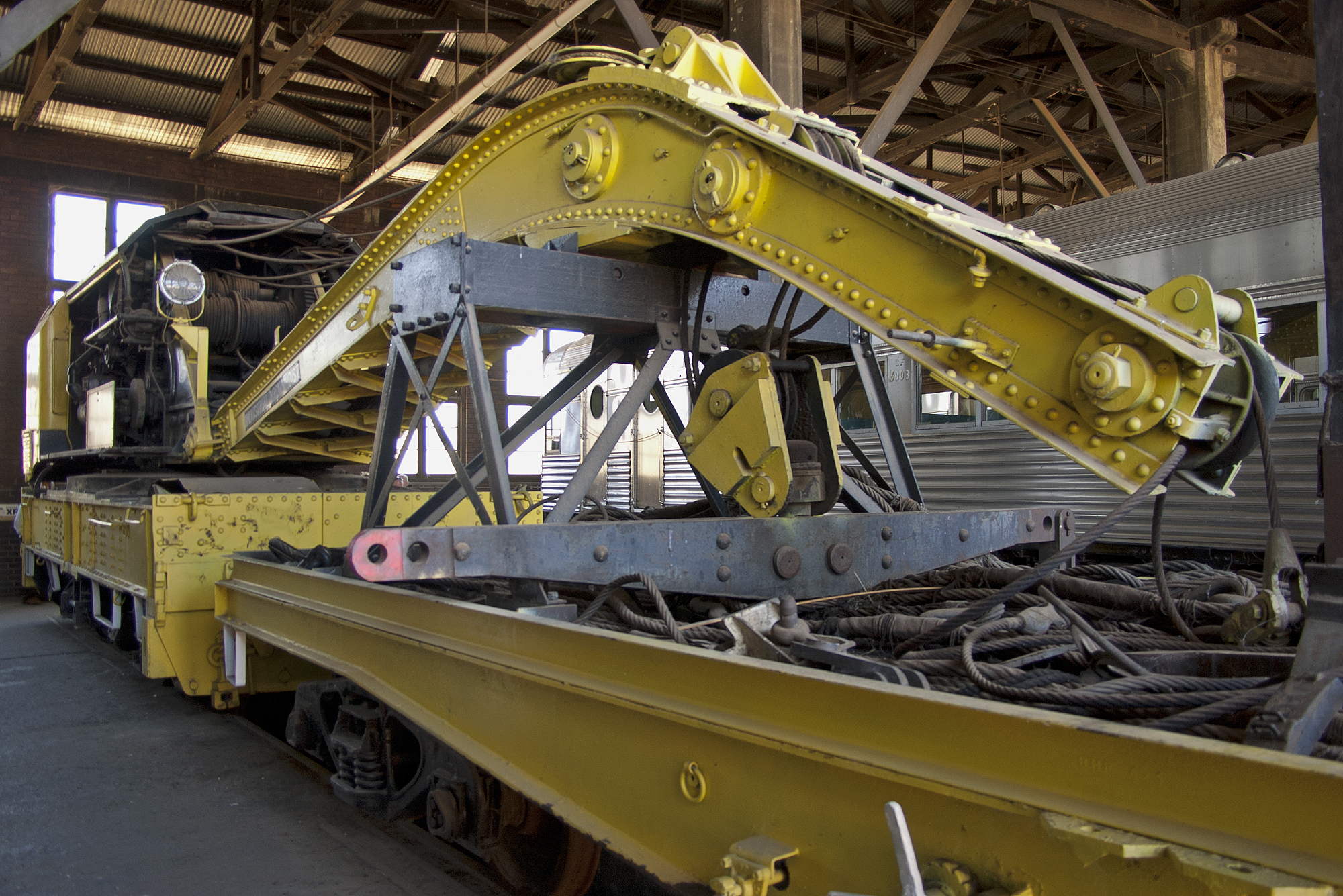
Industrial Brownhoist 1080 50 ton crane at Junee

| Number | Capacity | Built | Builder | Builder's no. | Pre 1924 No(s) | Fate |
|---|---|---|---|---|---|---|
| 1048 | 30t Steam | 1908 | Cowans Sheldon | 3012 | Lo07 | preserved Dorrigo Steam Railway & Museum |
| 1049 | 30t Steam | 1911 | Craven Brothers | Cr.9158 | Lo08 | scrapped 1970 |
| 1050 | 30t Steam | 1911 | Craven Brothers | Cr.9158 | Lo09 | preserved Dorrigo Steam Railway & Museum |
| 1055 | 35t Steam | 1915 | Ransome & Rapier | B7392 | Lo12 | converted to diesel 1972 - preserved Canberra Railway Museum |
| 1056 | 35t Steam | 1915 | Ransome & Rapier | B7392 | Lo13 | converted to diesel 1974 |
| 1060(2nd) | 120t Steam | 1957 | Krupp Ardelt | 204311 | - | converted to diesel 1991 - preserved Dorrigo Steam Railway & Museum |
| 1072 | 70t Steam | 1929 | Craven Brothers | Cr.12030+12031+12032 | - | converted to diesel 1971 - Preserved Goulburn Rail Heritage Centre |
| 1073 | 70t Steam | 1929 | Craven Brothers | Cr.12030+12031+12032 | - | converted to diesel 1968 - Preserved Richmond Vale Railway Museum |
| 1080 | 50t Steam | 1944 | Industrial Brownhoist | 7054 | ex United States Army | preserved Junee Locomotive Depot |
| 1081 | 50t Steam | 1944 | Industrial Brownhoist | ? | ex United States Army | preserved Dorrigo Steam Railway & Museum |

== General Duties Cranes ==
| Number | Type | Built | Builder | Builder's no. | Pre 1924 No(s) | Fate |
|---|---|---|---|---|---|---|
| 1027 | 0-6-0T coal crab | 1875 | Vale & Lacy | ? | N73, Lo16 | scrapped 1937 |
| 1028 | 0-6-0T coal crab | 1875 | Mort & Co. | 18 | N70, Lo17 | scrapped 1937 |
| 1029 | 0-6-0T coal crab | 1875 | Mort & Co. | 15 | N67, Lo18 | scrapped 1929 |
| 1030 | 0-4-0CT 4t Steam luffing crane | 1879 | Dübs & Company | 1237 | Shop 158, Lo02 | scrapped 1975 |
| 1034 | 0-4-0CT 4t Steam luffing crane | 1886 | Dübs & Company | 2250 | Shop 318, Lo03 | preserved Transport Heritage NSW |
| 1038 | 0-4-0CT 4t Steam luffing crane | 1877 | Dübs & Company | 2251 | Shop 115, Lo01 | scrapped 1966 |
| 1044 | 0-4-0CT 5t Steam luffing crane | 1907 | North British Locomotive Company | 13086 | Lo04 | scrapped 1969 |
| 1045 | 4wvb Steam grab crane | 1908 | Priestman | ? | Lo42 | scrapped 1946 |
| 1046 | 0-4-2CT 5t Steam luffing crane | 1909 | Beyer, Peacock & Company | 5260 | Lo05 | scrapped 1968 |
| 1047 | 0-4-2CT 5t Steam luffing crane | 1909 | Beyer, Peacock & Company | 5261 | Lo06 | scrapped 1968 |
| 1051 | 0-4-0CT 7t Steam luffing crane | 1914 | Hawthorn Leslie & Company | 3034 | Lo10 | scrapped 1980s |
| 1052 | 0-4-0CT 7t Steam luffing crane | 1914 | Hawthorn Leslie & Company | 3035 | Lo11 | preserved Dorrigo Steam Railway & Museum |
| 1053 | 4wvb Steam derrick crane | 1914 | Coles | ? | Lo30 | ? |
| 1054 | 8t Steam shovel | 1914 | Berry | ? | Lo31 | ? |
| 1057 | 4wvb 3t Coal grab | 1917 | Central Otis | ? | Lo45 | sold 1972 |
| 1058 | 4wvb 3t Steam crane | 1917 | Central Otis | ? | Lo46 | ? |
| 1059 | 4wvb 5t Steam crane | 1918 | Alfred Harman Works, Melbourne | ? | Lo34 | preserved Lachlan Valley Railway |
| 1060(1st) | 4wvb 5t Steam crane | 1918 | Alfred Harman Works, Melbourne | ? | Lo35 | sold 1954 |
| 1061 | 4wvb Coal grab | 1918 | Alfred Harman Works, Melbourne | ? | Lo36 | preserved Dorrigo Steam Railway & Museum |
| 1062 | 4wvb Coal grab | 1918 | Alfred Harman Works, Melbourne | ? | Lo37 | ? |
| 1063 | 4wvb Coal grab | 1918 | Alfred Harman Works, Melbourne | ? | Lo38 | ? |
| 1064 | 4wvb Coal grab | 1918 | Alfred Harman Works, Melbourne | ? | Lo39 | preserved Transport Heritage NSW |
| 1066 | 0-4-0CT 7t Steam luffing crane | 1923 | Hawthorn Leslie & Company | 3563 | Lo40 | scrapped 1968 |
| 1067 | 0-4-0CT 7t Steam luffing crane | 1924 | Hawthorn Leslie & Company | 3565 | Lo41 | preserved Dorrigo Steam Railway & Museum |
| 1068 | 0-4-0CT 7t Steam luffing crane | 1924 | Hawthorn Leslie & Company | 3564 | Lo47 | preserved Dorrigo Steam Railway & Museum |
| 1069 | 0-4-0CT 7t Steam luffing crane | 1925 | Hawthorn Leslie & Company | 3635 | Lo49 | scrapped 1970 |
| 1070 | 4wvb Steam crane | 1928 | Coles | ? | - | preserved Dorrigo Steam Railway & Museum |
| 1074 | 4wvb 3t Steam crane | 1923 | Grafton Crane Co. | ? | - | ? |
| 1075 | 4wvb 3t Steam crane | 1923 | Grafton Crane Co. | ? | - | preserved Dorrigo Steam Railway & Museum |
| 1079 | 3t diesel electric | 1938 | Harman | ? | - | preserved Dorrigo Steam Railway & Museum |
| 1082 | 0-4-0CT 7t Steam luffing crane | 1950 | Robert Stephenson & Hawthorns | 7542 | - | preserved Powerhouse Museum |
| 1083 | 0-4-0CT 7t Steam luffing crane | 1950 | Robert Stephenson & Hawthorns | 7543 | - | preserved South Eveleigh |

== Preservation ==
New South Wales M36 class locomotive

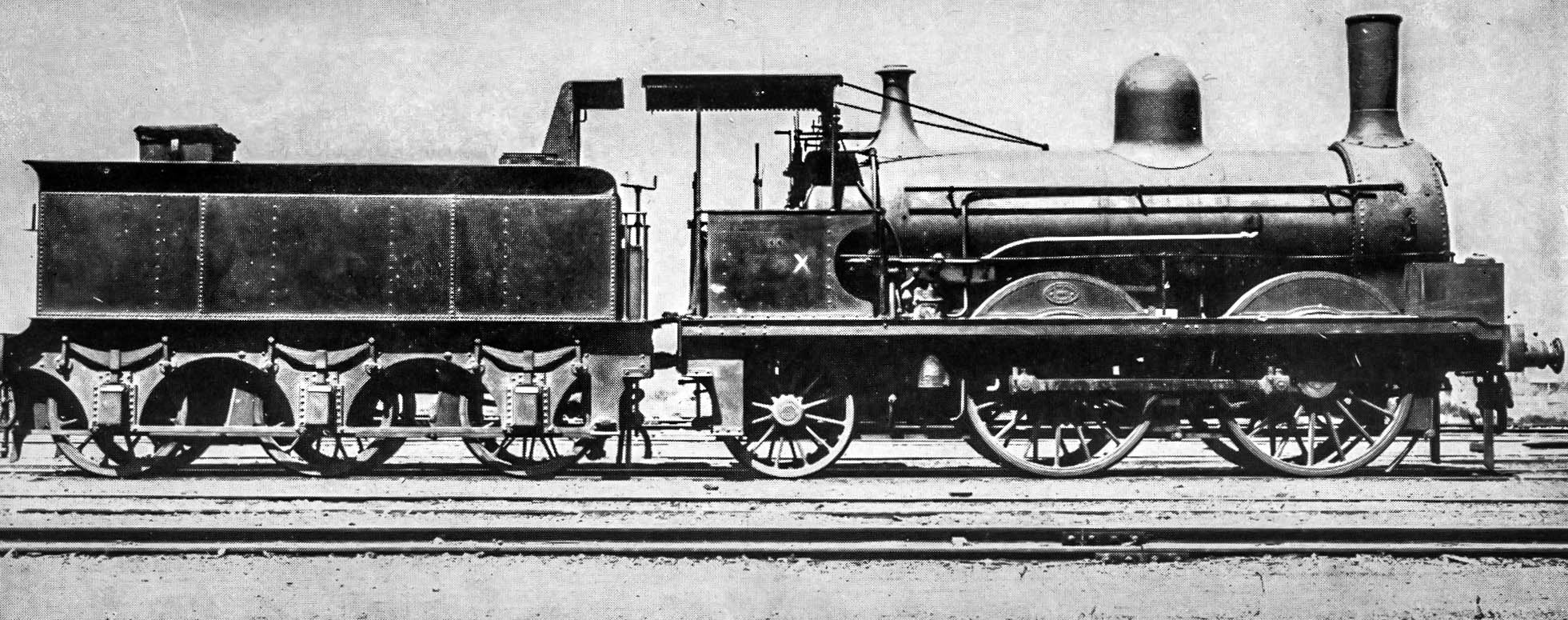
Locomotive M.36 mixed class

- 1004 by the Transport Heritage NSW, static exhibit as Locomotive 78

New South Wales F351 class locomotives

- 1033 by the Transport Heritage NSW, static exhibit, passenger locomotive
- 1042 at Maitand, ex-Cardiff Locomotive Workshops shunter, under restoration

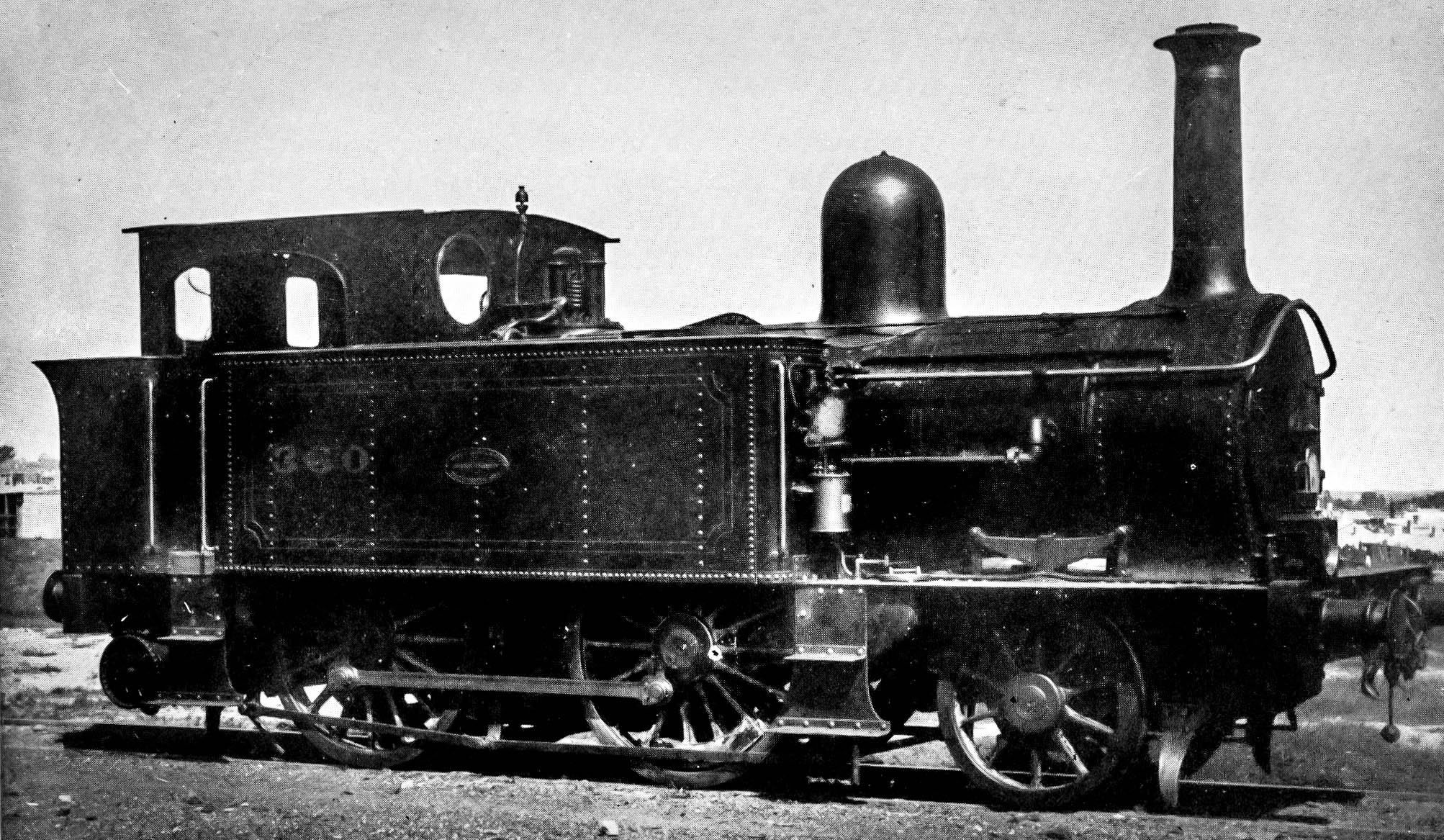
Locomotive F.351 class

Preserved items
| No. | Description | Manufacturer | Organisation | Status | Ref |
|---|---|---|---|---|---|
| 1021 | 0-4-0T saddle tank engine | Manning Wardle | Transport Heritage NSW | static exhibit | |
| 1022 | 0-4-0T saddle tank engine | Vulcan Iron Works | Valley Heights Locomotive Depot Heritage Museum | under restoration | |
| 1024 | Locomotive | Krauss-Maffei | Illawarra Light Railway Museum | operational | |
| 1034 | 4T crane | Dübs & Company | Transport Heritage NSW | static exhibit | |
| 1048 | 30T steam crane | Cowans Sheldon | Dorrigo Steam Railway & Museum | stored | |
| 1050 | 50T crane | Craven Brothers | Dorrigo Steam Railway & Museum | stored | |
| 1052 | 7T crane | Hawthorn Leslie & Company | Dorrigo Steam Railway & Museum | stored | |
| 1055 | 35T crane | Ransome & Rapier | Canberra Railway Museum | stored | |
| 1057 | 3T coal grab | | Private owner | stored | |
| 1059 | 3T coal grab | | Lachlan Valley Railway | stored | |
| 1060 | 120T crane | Krupp Ardelt | Dorrigo Steam Railway & Museum | stored | |
| 1061 | 5T crane | Alfred Harman | Dorrigo Steam Railway & Museum | stored | |
| 1064 | 3T coal grab | Alfred Harman | Transport Heritage NSW | stored | |
| 1067 | 7T crane | Hawthorn Leslie & Company | Dorrigo Steam Railway & Museum | stored | |
| 1068 | 7T crane | Hawthorn Leslie & Company | Dorrigo Steam Railway & Museum | stored | |
| 1070 | crane | Henry J Cole | Dorrigo Steam Railway & Museum | stored | |
| 1072 | 70T accident crane | Craven Brothers | Goulburn Rail Heritage Centre | stored | |
| 1073 | 70T accident crane | Craven Brothers | Richmond Vale Railway Museum | operational | |
| 1075 | 3T Crane | Grafton | Dorrigo Steam Railway & Museum | stored | |
| 1076 | 0-6-0T Tank Engine (formerly 1804) | Vulcan Foundry | Goulburn Rail Heritage Centre | operational | |
| 1077 | 0-6-0T Tank Engine (formerly 1803) | Vulcan Foundry | Transport Heritage NSW | now Thomas the Tank Engine | |
| 1080 | 50T Crane | Industrial Brownhoist | Junee Locomotive Depot | stored | |
| 1081 | 50T Crane | Industrial Brownhoist | Dorrigo Steam Railway & Museum | stored | |
| 1082 | 7T Crane | Robert Stephenson & Hawthorns | Powerhouse Museum | stored | |
| 1083 | 7T Crane | Robert Stephenson & Hawthorns | South Eveleigh | static display | |

== Gallery ==
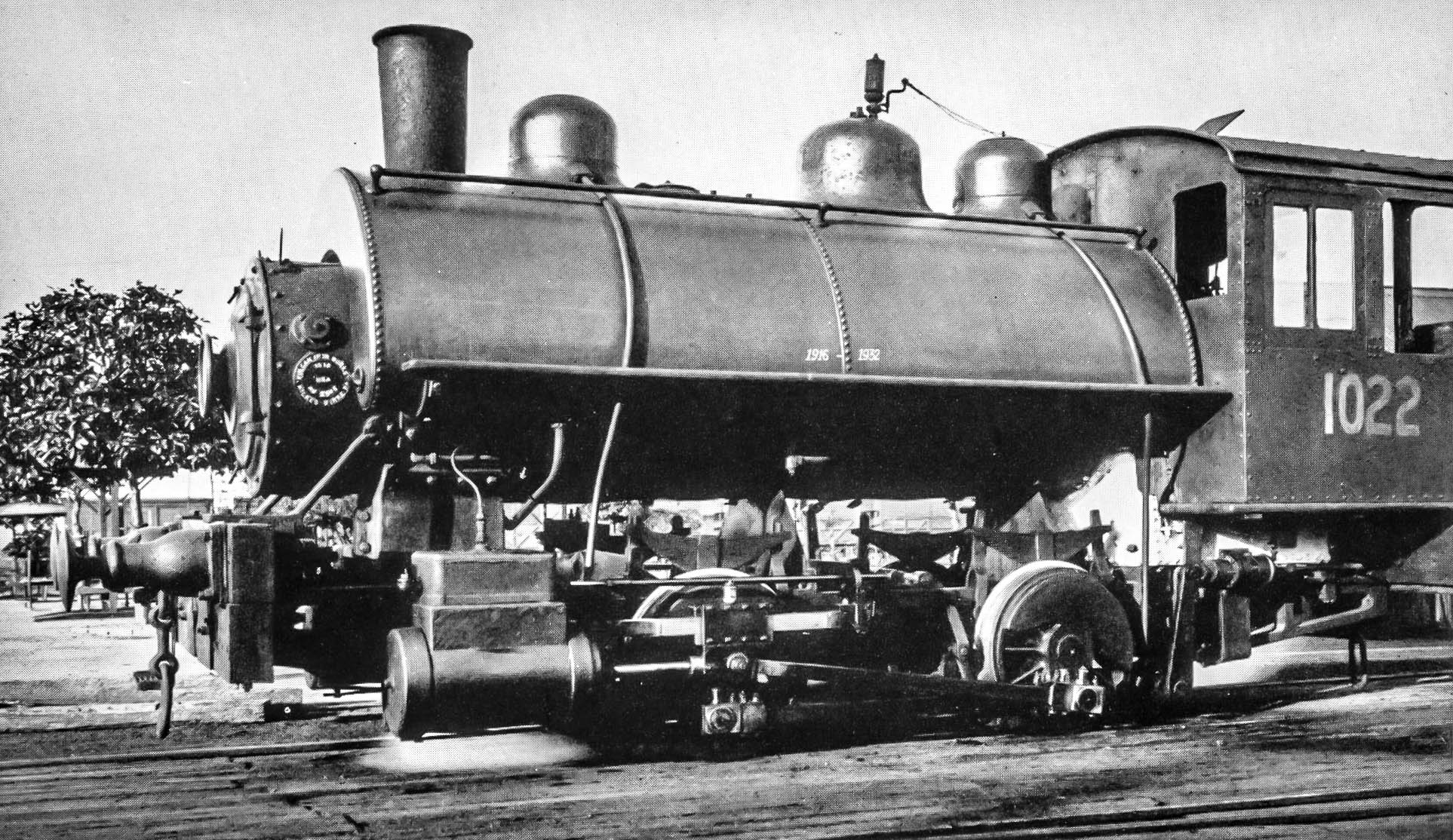
Locomotive Depot Shunter 1022

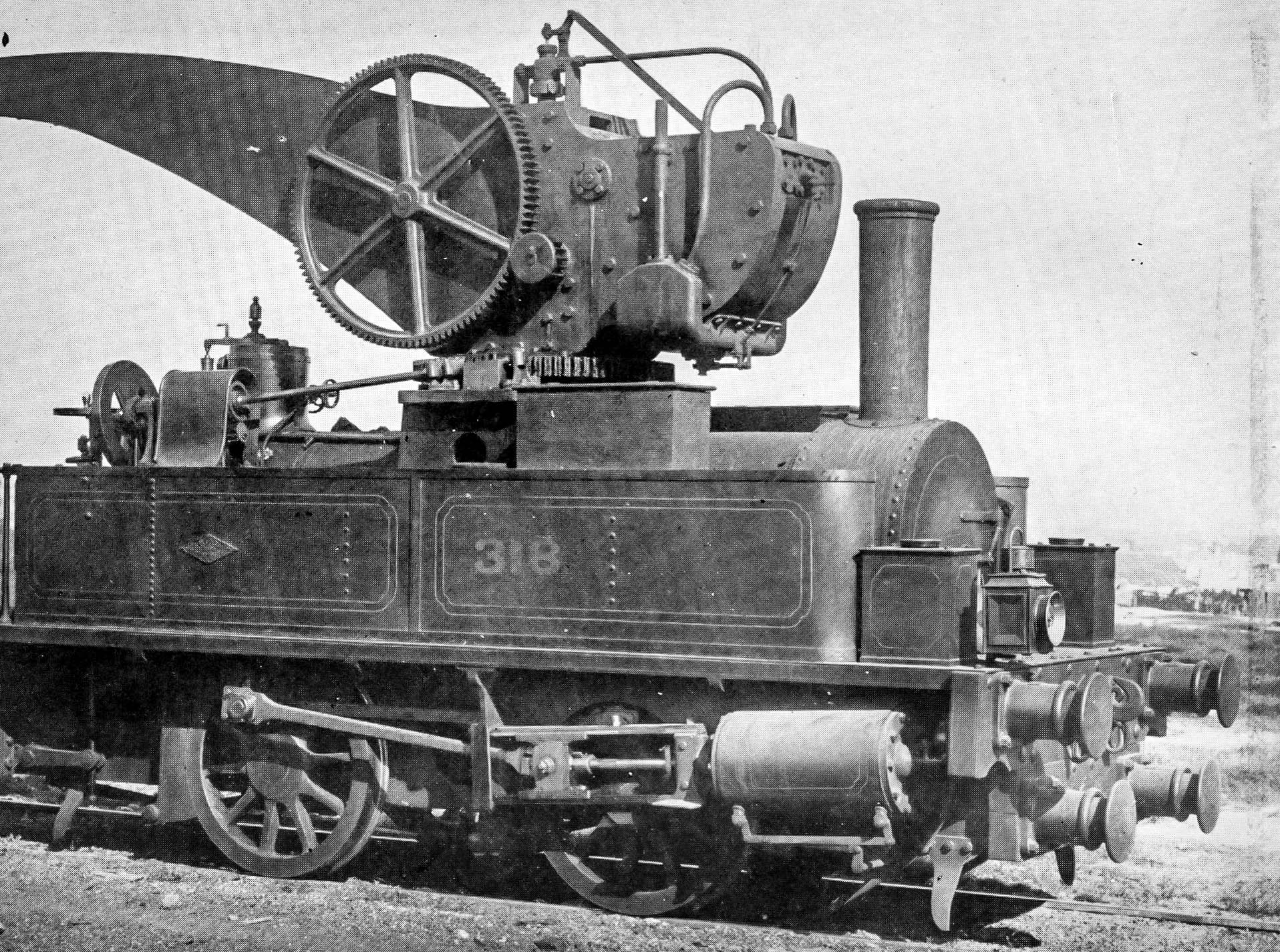
Locomotive Crane 1034 (former 318)

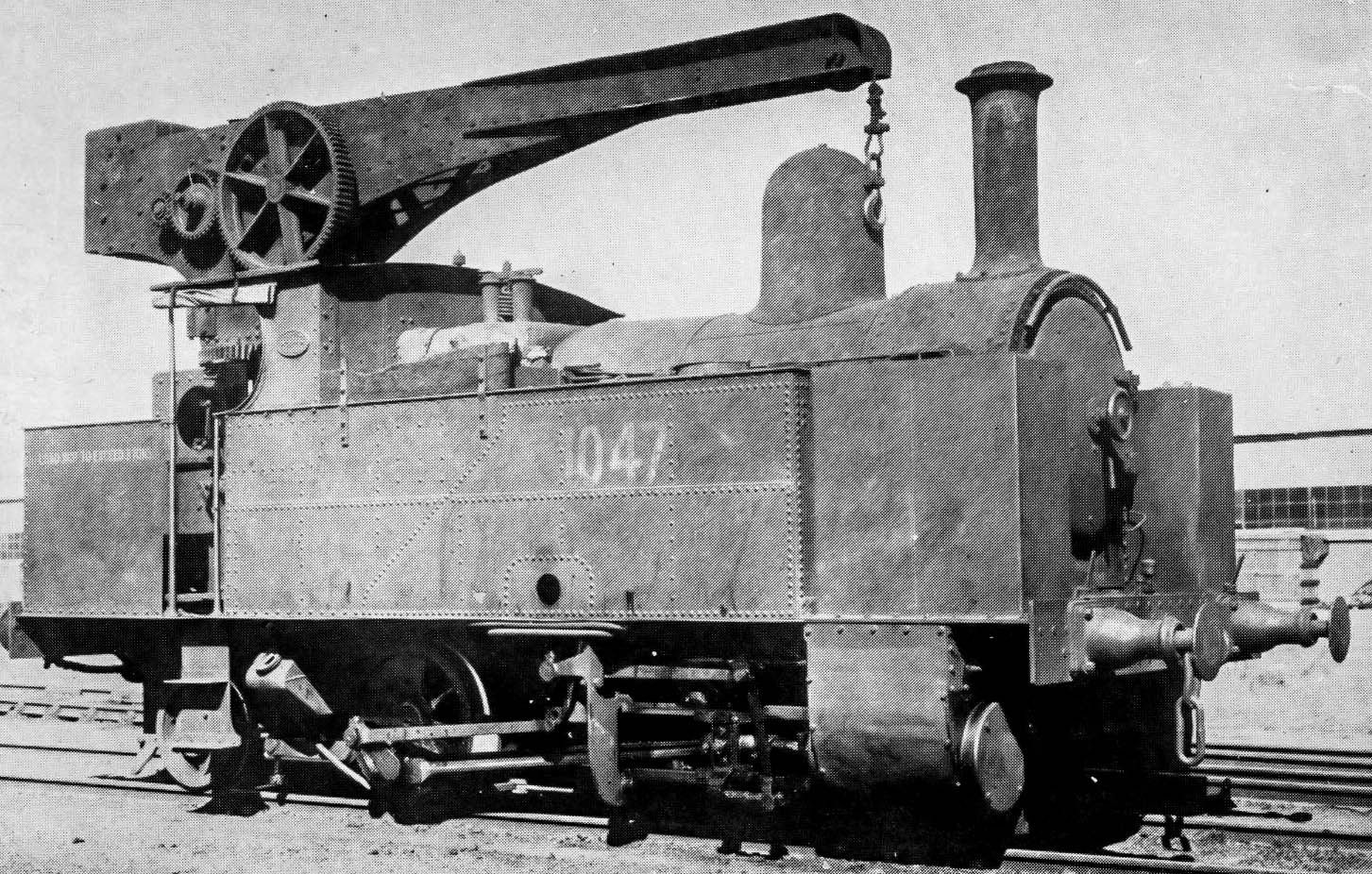
Locomotive Crane 1047

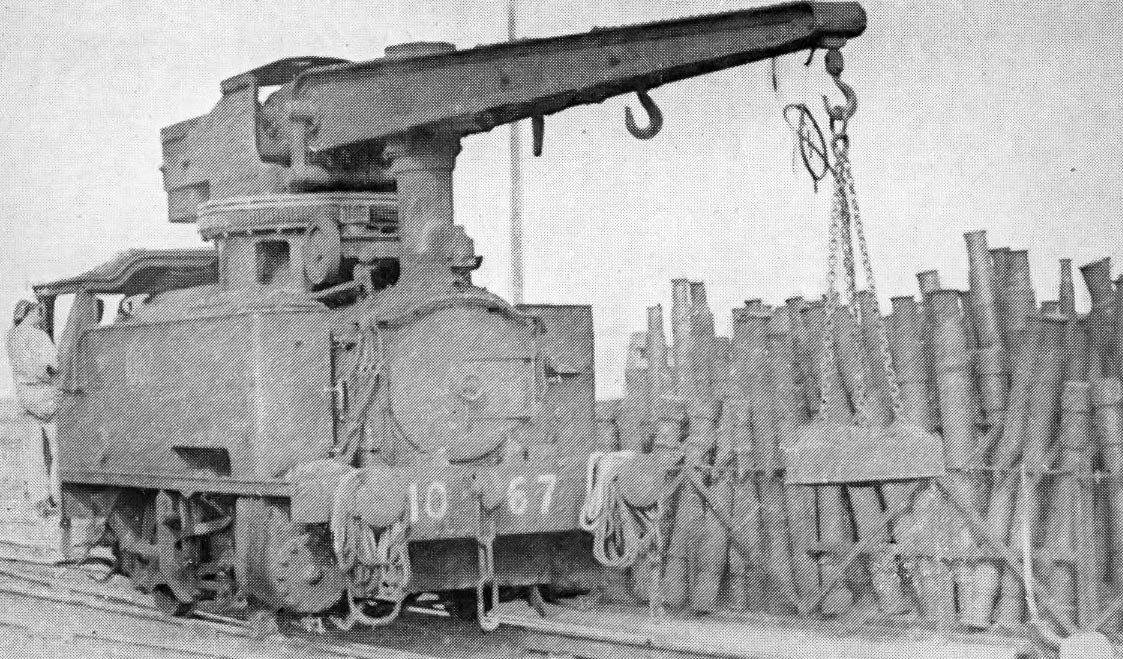
Locomotive Crane 1067

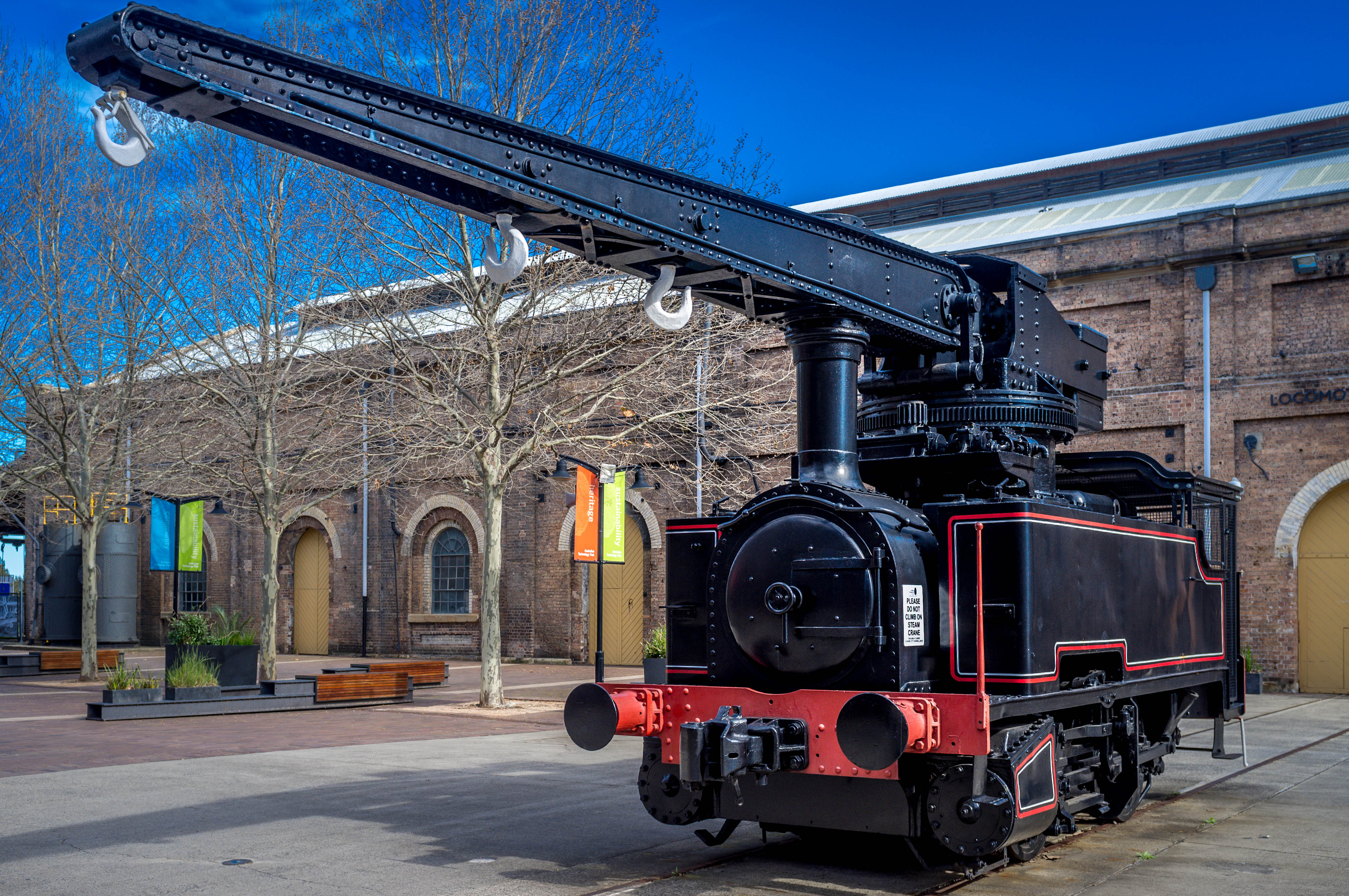
1083 displayed at South Eveleigh

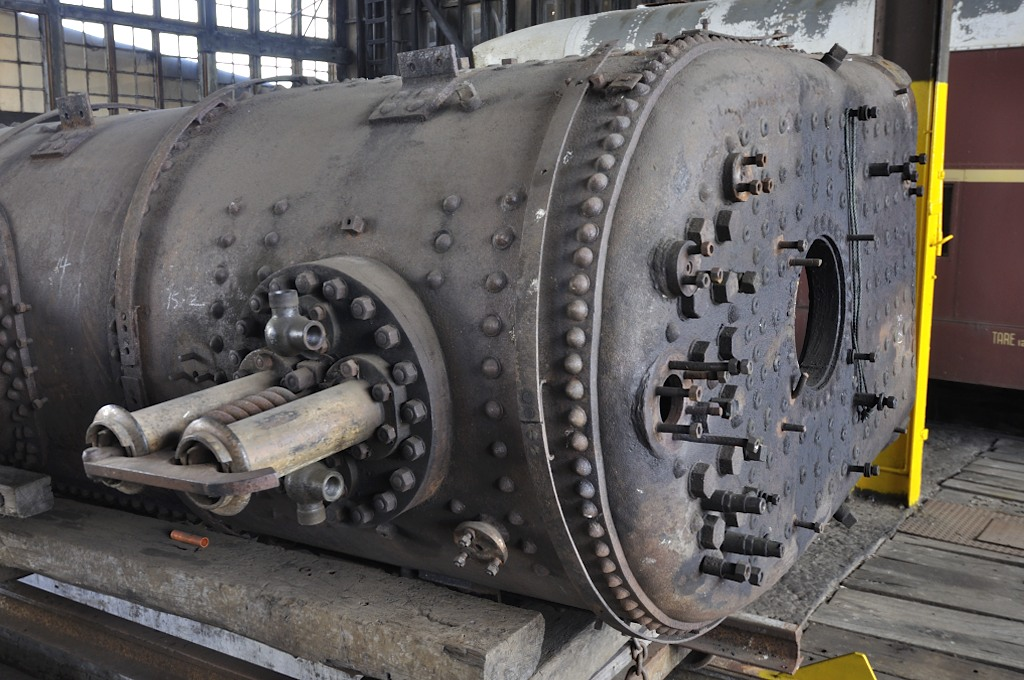
1076 at Goulburn Roundhouse

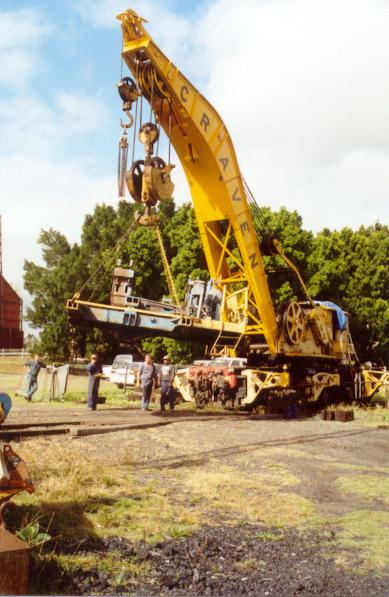
1073 Craven Brothers Crane

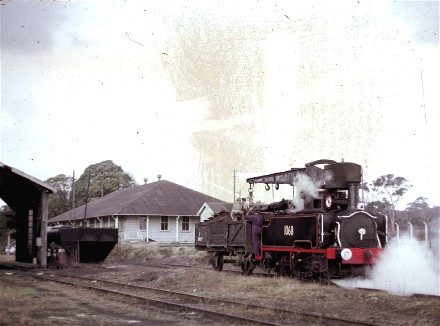
1068 Locomotive Crane
