= South Australian Railways P class =

Class of Australian 2-4-0T locomotives

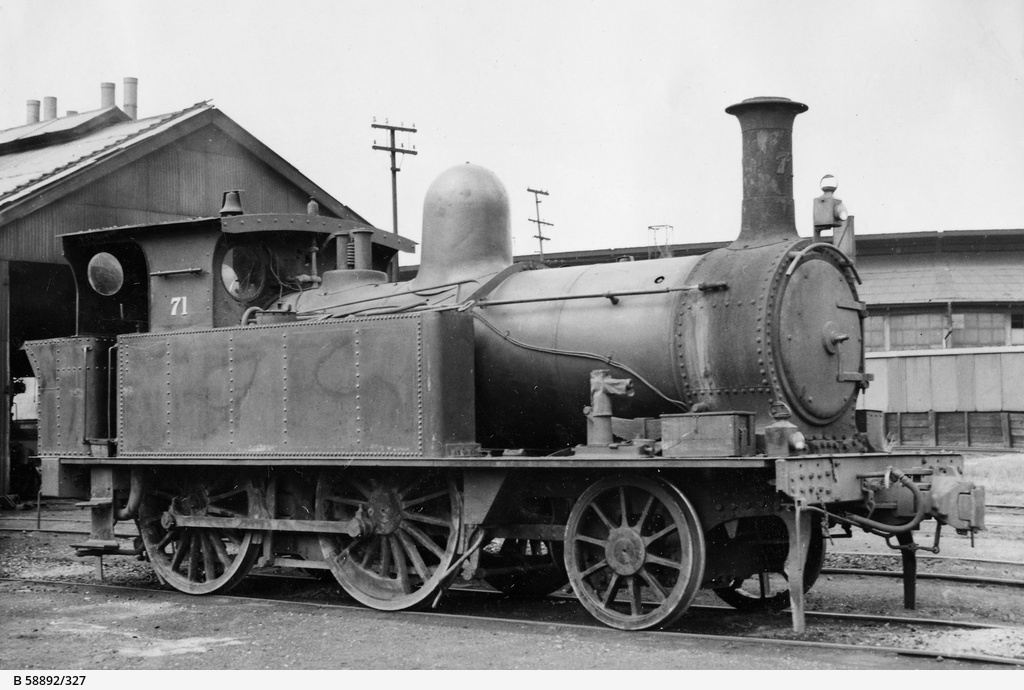
- P71 at Mile End in 1952
Type and origin
- Power type: Steam
- Builder: Beyer, Peacock & Co (6); James Martin & Co (14)
- Serial number: BP: 2401-2404, 2528-2529; JM: 52-55, 57-66
- Build date: 1884-1893
- Total produced: 20
Specifications
- Configuration
  - Whyte: 2-4-0T (1′B)
- Gauge: 1,600 mm (5 ft 3 in)
- Leading dia.: 3 ft 6 in (1,067 mm)
- Driver dia.: 5 ft 0 in (1,524 mm)
- Length: 28 ft 5 in (8,661 mm)
- Height: 12 ft 0 in (3,657.6 mm)
- Axle load: 12 long tons 14 cwt (28,400 lb or 12.9 t)
- Adhesive weight: 24.55 long tons 0 cwt (55,000 lb or 24.9 t)
- Loco weight: 33.7 long tons (37.7 short tons; 34.2 t)
- Fuel type: Coal
- Fuel capacity: 1.5 long tons (1.7 short tons; 1.5 t)
- Water cap.: 600 imp gal (720 US gal; 2,700 L)
- Firebox
  - Grate area: 14.67 sq ft (1.363 m^{2})
- Boiler pressure: 145 psi (1,000 kPa)
- Heating surface
  - Firebox: 187.49 sq ft (17.418 m^{2})
  - Tubes: 1,847.49 sq ft (171.637 m^{2})
- Cylinders: 2
- Cylinder size: 16 in × 0 in (406 mm × 0 mm)
- Valve gear: Stephenson
- Valve type: Piston
Performance figures
- Tractive effort: 10,517 lbf (46.78 kN)
- Factor of adh.: 5.23
Career
- Operators: South Australian Railways
- Class: P
- Number in class: 20
- Numbers: P21, P22, P70-P75, P115-P126
- First run: 29/08/1884
- Withdrawn: 1929-1957
- Preserved: P117
- Scrapped: 1929-1960
- Disposition: 1 preserved, 19 scrapped

The South Australian Railways P class is a class of 2-4-0T steam locomotives operated by the South Australian Railways.

== History ==
The first six were built by Beyer, Peacock & Co for the South Australian Railways (SAR) in 1884.

Their design was based on an earlier design built by Beyer Peacock for the Isle of Wight Railway. The New South Wales Government Railways F351 class locomotive was also based on this design. The class was successful and a further 14 locomotives were built by James Martin & Co.

Initially the locomotives served hauling suburban trains in Adelaide until replaced by the F class in the early 1900s. In 1899, the SAR took over operations on the Glenelg Railway Company's two lines. The P and K classes replaced the small tank engines on this line, running until 1929 when the lines were closed. The P class served out the remainder of its career on shunting duties and hauling freight trains between Adelaide and Port Adelaide.

P117 has been preserved by the National Railway Museum, Port Adelaide.
