= New South Wales M36 class locomotive =

Class of 0-4-2 steam locomotive operated in Australia

New South Wales M36 class
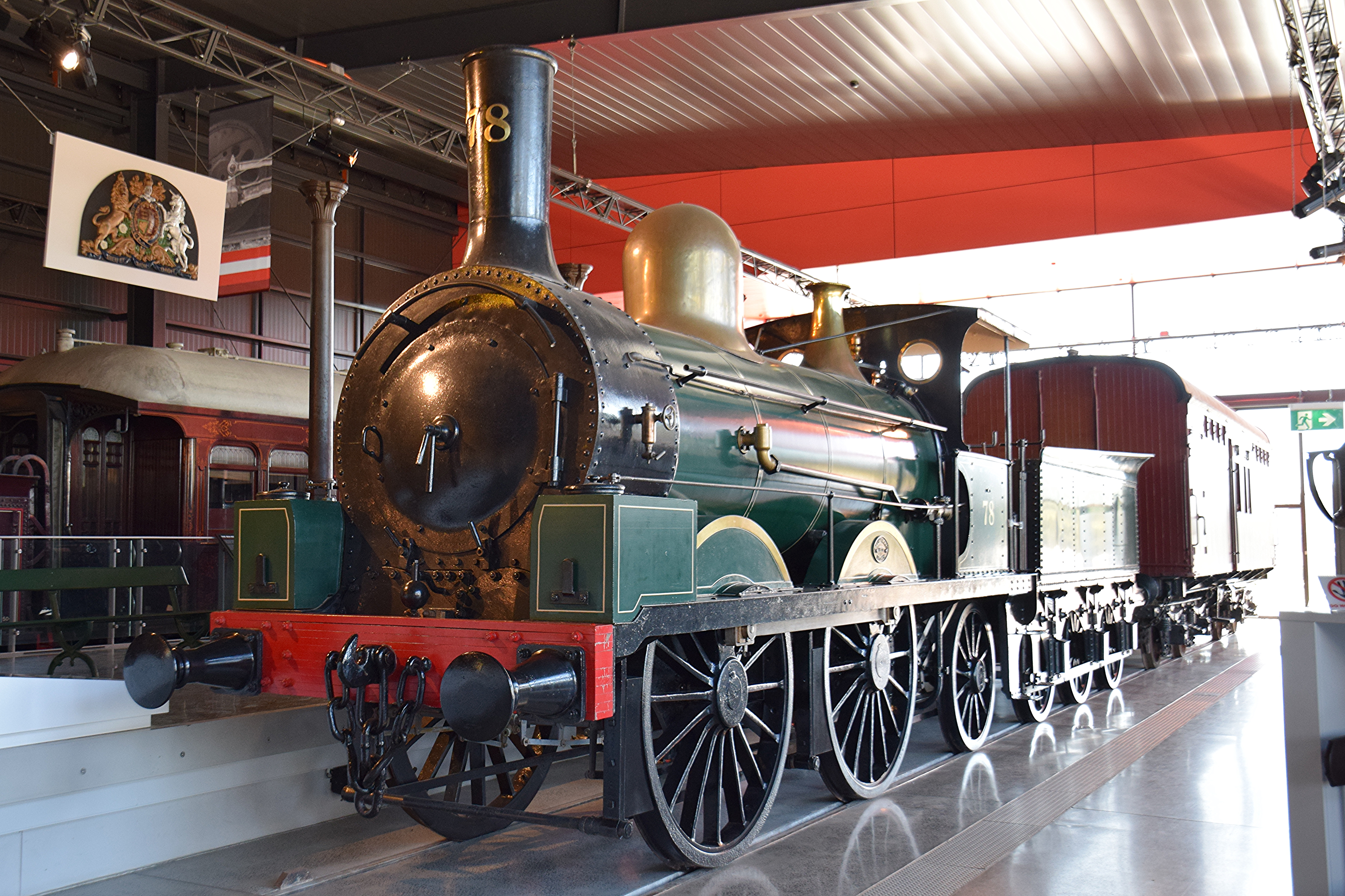
- M.36 class locomotive at the NSW Railway Museum, Thirlmere
Type and origin
- Power type: Steam
- Builder: Mort's Dock (4); Eveleigh Railway Workshops (4)
- Serial number: 36–39, 77–78
- Build date: 1870–77
- Total produced: 8
Specifications
- Configuration
  - Whyte: 0-4-2
- Gauge: 4 ft 8 1/2 in (1,435 mm) standard gauge
- Driver dia.: 5 ft 6 in (1,676 mm)
- Loco weight: 52 long tons (53 tonnes; 58 short tons)
- Fuel type: Coal
- Firebox
  - Grate area: 15 sq ft (1.4 m^{2})
- Cylinders: 2
- Cylinder size: 16 in × 24 in (406 mm × 610 mm)
Performance figures
- Tractive effort: 9,700 lbf (43.1 kN)
Career
- Operators: New South Wales Government Railways
- Delivered: 1870–1871, 1876–1877
- Preserved: 78
- Scrapped: 1891–1904
- Disposition: 1 preserved, 7 scrapped.

The M36 class is a class of steam locomotives built for the New South Wales Government Railways in Australia. The class was redesignated as the X10 class later during its service.

== History ==
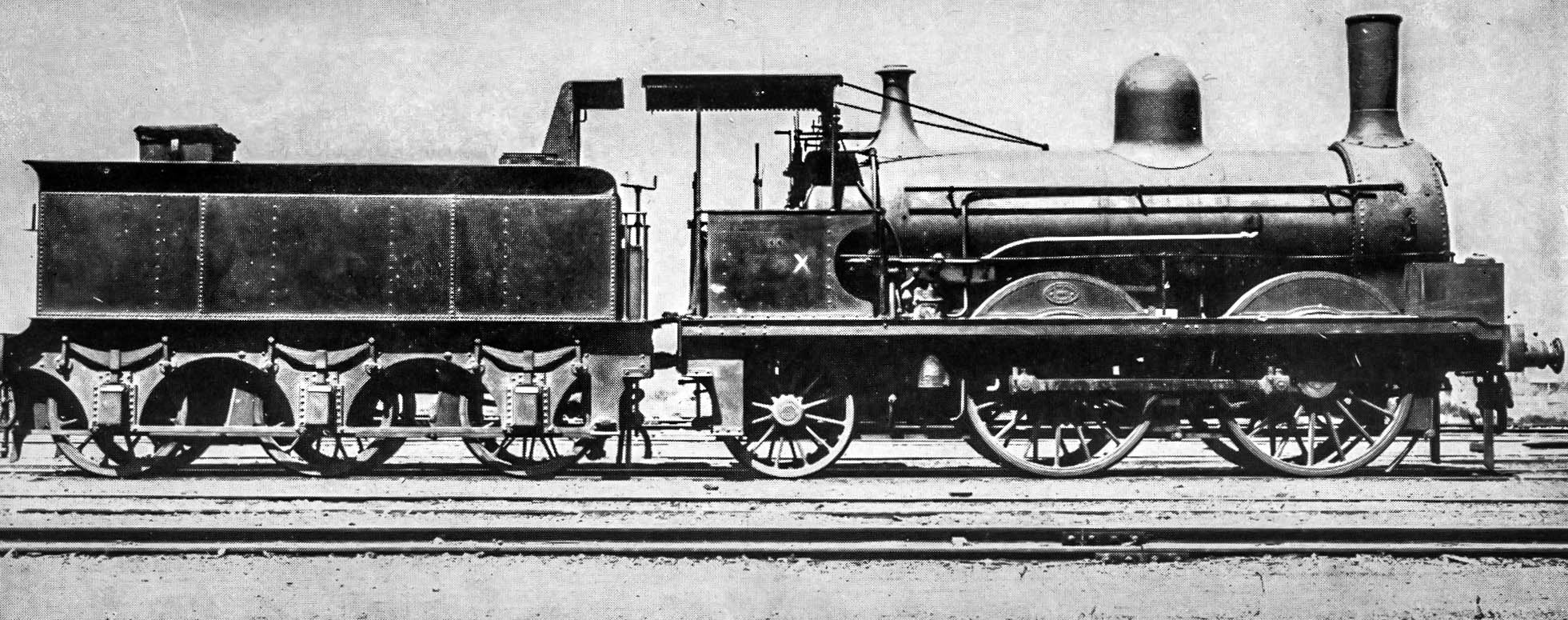
NSWGR Locomotive M.36 mixed class

In the late 1860s, four more of the 1 class where manufactured by Mort's Dock Sydney in 1870–71. Another four locomotives of the M.36 class were manufactured at Eveleigh Railway Workshops in 1876–77 using re-built tenders from Locomotive No.1–4. Two of the class later had cab shelters fitted to the tenders for suburban running.

== Preservation ==
All engines of the class were scrapped in the period 1891–1904 with the exception of No. 78

Preserved M36 class locomotives
| No. | Description | Manufacturer | Year | Current organisation | Location | Status |
|---|---|---|---|---|---|---|
| 78 | 0-4-2 mixed traffic | Eveleigh Railway Workshops | 1877 | Transport Heritage NSW | Thirlmere | static exhibit |

== See also ==
- NSWGR steam locomotive classification
