= Locomotive 7100 =

7100 (ex. 4501)
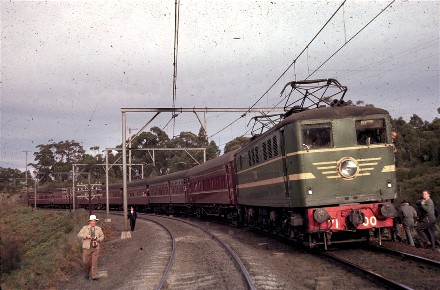
- 7100 at Berowra in June 1962
Type and origin
- Power type: Electric
- Builder: Chullora Railway Workshops
- Build date: 1952
Specifications
- Configuration
  - UIC: Co′Co′
- Gauge: 4 ft 8 1/2 in (1,435 mm) standard gauge
- Wheel diameter: 48 in (1,219 mm)
- Wheelbase: 41 ft (12.5 m)
- Length: Over headstocks: 52 ft 2 in (15.90 m), Over coupler pulling faces: 55 ft 4 in (16.87 m)
- Width: 9 ft 7 in (2,921 mm)
- Height: Over stowed pantograph: 14 ft 6 in (4,420 mm)
- Axle load: 18 long tons 0 cwt (40,300 lb or 18.3 t)
- Loco weight: 108 long tons 0 cwt (241,900 lb or 109.7 t)
- Sandbox cap.: 17.6 cu ft (0.50 m^{3})
- Electric system/s: 1,500 V DC Catenary
- Current pickup: Two pantographs
- Traction motors: 6 × Metropolitan-Vickers 179
Performance figures
- Maximum speed: 70 mph (113 km/h)
- Power output: One hour: 2,700 hp (2,013 kW)
- Tractive effort: Continuous: 28,000 lbf (124.55 kN)
Career
- Operators: NSW Department of Railways
- Numbers: 4501, 7100 from October 1961
- Nicknames: Green Beetle
- First run: 21 July 1952
- Withdrawn: June 1974
- Current owner: Transport Heritage NSW
- Disposition: Preserved

Locomotive 7100, earlier designated as 4501, is a mainline electric locomotive built in-house in 1952 by the New South Wales Department of Railways' Chullora Railway Workshops. 4501 was renumbered 7100 in October 1961, which freed up the number range for the 45-class diesel locomotives.

== Construction ==
The electric locomotive was designed by the New South Wales Department of Railways and was built at their Chullora Railway Workshops using components supplied by Commonwealth Engineering. It was completed in June 1952 and numbered 4501.

== Operation ==
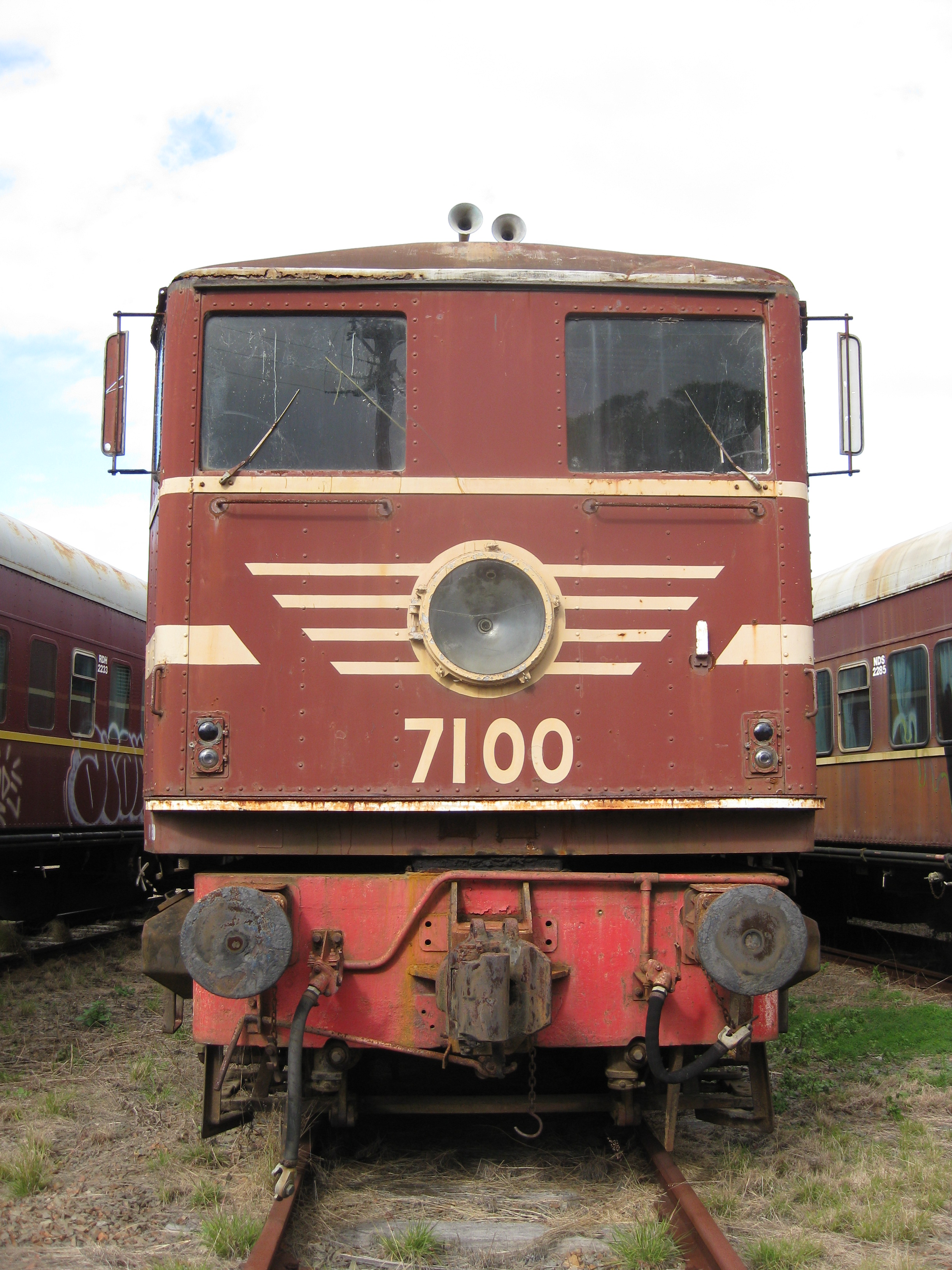
7100 at Broadmeadow Locomotive Depot in July 2012

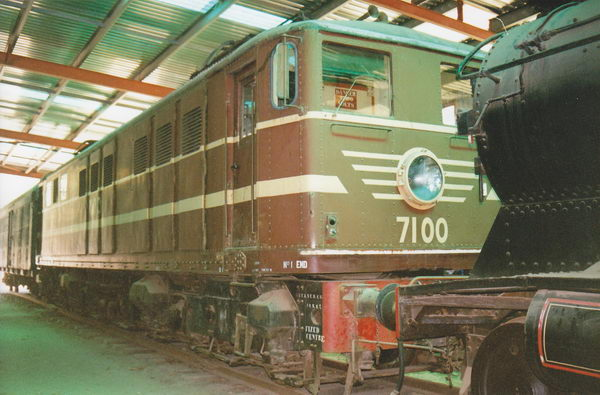
7100 at the New South Wales Rail Transport Museum, Thirlmere in 2001

4501 had a one-hour power rating of 2,700 horsepower (2,000 kW) with a total weight of 108 long tons (110 t). Its maximum speed was 70 miles per hour (110 km/h) It had a driving compartment at each end of its very box-shaped body. Its colour scheme being bottle green, with chrome lining, it became affectionately known as the Green Beetle.

Its purpose was to provide experience of operating powerful electric locomotives prior to the arrival of the 46 class locomotives which had been ordered from England for use on the electrified Main Western line to Bowenfels. Once the electrification project had reached Penrith in October 1955, 4501 had its first opportunity to haul passenger trains. Six months later, when the first 46-class arrived, the locomotive became a regular assistant locomotive for steam powered trains on the Main North line between North Strathfield and Hornsby.

In 1957, it was transferred to the Flemington Maintenance Depot where it was employed as a shunter. At the time, Flemington was the base for all locomotive hauled air-conditioned carriages.

In October 1961, it was re-numbered 7100. In October 1967, it received a major overhaul where several tonnes of additional ballast was added. Main-line safeworking equipment was provided to allow it to haul coal trains over the newly electrified Main South from Glenlee to Rozelle.

== Retirement ==
Failures dogged the veteran locomotive and it was withdrawn in June 1974. Following an extended period of storage, it was placed at the New South Wales Rail Transport Museum (now NSW Rail Museum) moved to Thirlmere. In April 2009, it was relocated to the former Broadmeadow Locomotive Depot. It is now on Transport Asset Holding Entity's heritage list. In 2024 it was moved to undercover storage at the Heritage Hub at Chullora Workshops.
