= New South Wales Z18 class locomotive =

Australian steam locomotive class

New South Wales Z18 class
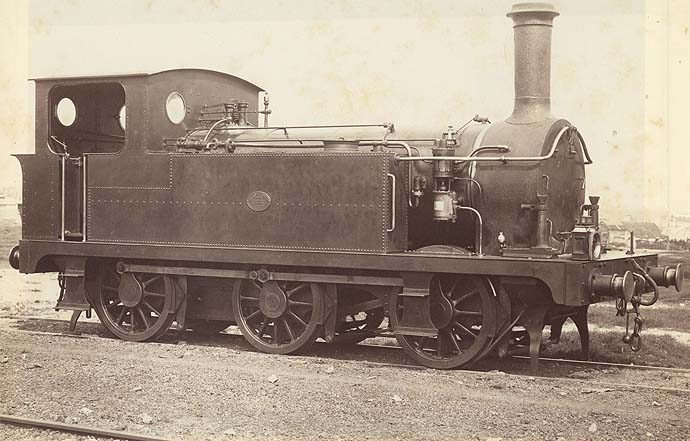
- Z18 class 1806 c.1884
Type and origin
- Power type: Steam
- Builder: Vulcan Foundry
- Serial number: 992–997
- Build date: 1882
- Total produced: 6
Specifications
- Configuration
  - Whyte: 0-6-0T
  - UIC: Cn
- Gauge: 4 ft 8 1/2 in (1,435 mm) standard gauge
- Driver dia.: 4 ft 0 in (1,219 mm)
- Loco weight: 37.5 long tons (38.1 t)
- Water cap.: 850 imp gal (3,900 L; 1,020 US gal)
- Firebox
  - Grate area: 13 sq ft (1.2 m^{2})
- Boiler pressure: 140 psi (970 kPa)
- Heating surface: 880 sq ft (82 m^{2})
- Superheater: None
- Cylinders: Two, inside
- Cylinder size: 15 in × 22 in (381 mm × 559 mm)
Performance figures
- Tractive effort: 12,272 lbf (54.6 kN)
Career
- Operators: New South Wales Government Railways
- Class: 285, R285 from 1889, Z18 from 1924
- Numbers: 285–290; 1801–1806 from 1924
- Retired: 1963–1972
- Disposition: 2 preserved, 4 scrapped

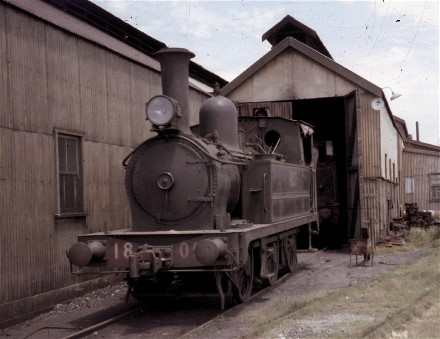
1805 stands outside the Reid's Hill depot, Port Kembla

The Z18 class (formerly 285 class and R.285 class) is a class consisting of six 0-6-0T steam tank locomotives built by Vulcan Foundry for the New South Wales Government Railways of Australia.

== Order ==
An order was placed in February 1882, with the Vulcan Foundry for six 2-4-0T locomotives to the specification of the then Acting Locomotive Engineer, Mr Scott. During Mr Scott's subsequent absence in England on official business, Thomas Middleton, Locomotive Engineer, had the specifications altered to 0-6-0T wheel arrangement, together with other variations to the original order. Middleton claimed that the revised design would enable the locomotives to run at 30–33 mph (48–53 km/h) in suburban service. Commissioner Goodchap approved the changes and despite the protests on Scott's return, the variations were made.

The six locomotives were delivered in 1884 and designated the 285 class. They became the (R) 285 class in 1889 and the Z18 class in 1924.

== Operation ==
Their 4-foot-0-inch (1.219 m) driving wheels proved too small for the speed required and they were reduced to shunting duties in Sydney Yard, with just the occasional venture into the suburbs.

In 1907, the locomotives were fitted with new domed boilers, replacing the domeless versions originally fitted. This increased their weight by 3 tons which improved their adhesion factor. Power reversing gear was fitted in 1922, making them the first class in New South Wales to be so fitted. It was a hydraulic type and was excellent when shunting at Sydney station, however this was only short lived and lever reversing gear was fitted shortly after.

In 1927, following the release of other locomotives with the electrification of the Sydney suburban network, the class was transferred to locomotive depot work, some being fitted with cranes and renumbered into the (X)10 series. Later, with the cranes removed, they were restored to their Z18 numbers and worked at Port Kembla shunting. 1076 was an exception which continued to be known by that number. No. 1802 (originally R286) was sold to the Public Works Department in 1927 and became their No. 75. It continued in service until being scrapped in 1964. 1801 and 1806 were sold to the Wallarah Coal Company in 1957 and worked on the isolated Catherine Hill Bay Coal Railway until the line ceased operation in December 1963.

== Preservation ==
Preserved Z18 class locomotives
| No. | Description | Manufacturer | Year | Current organisation | Location | Status | Ref |
|---|---|---|---|---|---|---|---|
| 1803 | 0-6-0 T passenger | Vulcan Foundry | 1884 | NSW Rail Museum | Thirlmere | Thomas the Tank Engine | NSW Locomotive, Steam 1803 |
| 1804 | 0-6-0T Tank Engine | Vulcan Foundry | 1884 | Goulburn Loco Roundhouse Preservation Society | Goulburn | Undergoing steam trials | (now 1076) |

== See also ==
- NSWGR steam locomotive classification

== Extra reading ==
- "Vulcan Foundry locomotive list".
