= Goulburn Rail Heritage Centre =

Railway museum in Goulburn, Australia

Goulburn Railway Workshops
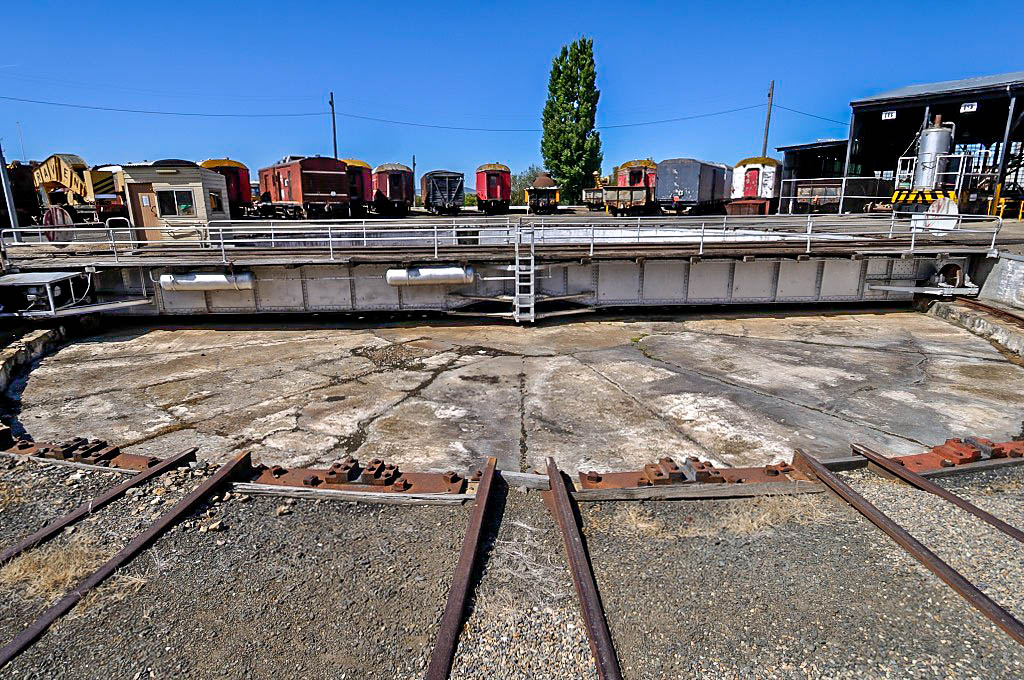
- Goulburn locomotive depot
- Interactive map of Goulburn Railway Workshops

Location
- Location: 12 Braidwood Road Goulburn, New South Wales, Australia
- Coordinates: 34.7711564°S 149.7114792°E

History
- Opened: 1869
- Closed: 1986

The Goulburn Rail Heritage Centre is located at the heritage-listed former railway workshops in Goulburn, New South Wales, Australia, on the Main Southern railway line. Now a museum, it is also known as the Goulburn Rail Workshop and Goulburn Roundhouse. The workshops were added to the New South Wales State Heritage Register on 2 April 1999. The workshops were saved from demolition by the Goulburn Locomotive Roundhouse Preservation Society and is now a museum open to the public with large collection of rolling stock and various exhibits, as well as privately owned locomotives and carriages with some commercial repair work happening on site.

== History ==
Following the completion of the first railway from Sydney to Parramatta Junction in 1855, proposals for the first railways to the rest of NSW included a line to the inland centre of Goulburn. A single line from Marulan to Goulburn opened on 27 May 1869.

A depot was built by the New South Wales Government Railways on the southern outskirts of the town when the line from Sydney was opened to Goulburn in May 1869. In 1918, a 42 road roundhouse opened.

Associated railway structures at Goulburn included the goods shed (1868), carriage shed (1869), engine shed (1869), a coal stage, water pump, turntable, and the station master’s residence (1870).

The roundhouse was constructed of brick and corrugated iron in 1918 around a 27.4 metres (90 feet) electric-powered turntable.

The locomotive depot closed in July 1986 with its allocation of locomotives transferred to Junee Locomotive Depot, but remained as a stabling and refueling point for a few years. Goulburn City Council took out a lease on the roundhouse hoping to establish a national rail museum.

The Goulburn Roundhouse Museum became home to several preserved locomotives with the New South Wales Rail Transport Museum transferring 2419 from Thirlmere in August 1989.

In 1980, a wagon building and maintenance facility was constructed to the north of the roundhouse. In July 2006 this was transferred to UGL Rail. Following UGL Rail deciding to close the workshop in June 2010, in September 2010 Chicago Freight Car Leasing Australia signed a ten-year lease for the site to maintain both its locomotive and wagon fleets. As well as maintaining its own fleet, Chicago Freight Car Leasing Australia also perform maintenance for other operators including Aurizon.

== Museum exhibits ==
The Museum has a collection of railway locomotives, carriages, wagons and other railway equipment including:

Steam Locomotives
No	Description	Manufacturer	Year	Location	Status	Ref
1072	70T accident crane	Craven Brothers	1929	Goulburn	stored – out of service
1076	0-6-0T Tank Engine	Vulcan Foundry	1884	Goulburn	operational	(formerly 1804)
2419	2-6-0 goods	Dübs and Company	1891	Goulburn	static exhibit	Locomotive, Steam 2419
3085	4-6-4T passenger	Eveleigh Railway Workshops	1912	Goulburn	static exhibit	NSW Locomotive, Steam 3085
5908	2-8-2 goods	Baldwin Locomotive Works	1952	Goulburn	static exhibit	Locomotive, Steam 5908
5916	2-8-2 goods	Baldwin Locomotive Works	1952	Goulburn	static exhibit

Other Locomotives

- 48 Class diesel locomotive 4821 (operational)
- General Electric Bo-Bo L80T diesel locomotive D1 (under restoration)
- Clyde Engineering Co-Co GM12 Class diesel locomotive GM19 (owned by RailPower)
- Beyer, Peacock & Co 4-6-0 C32 class steam locomotive 3237 (Operational, owned by Lachlan Valley Railway)

== Gallery ==
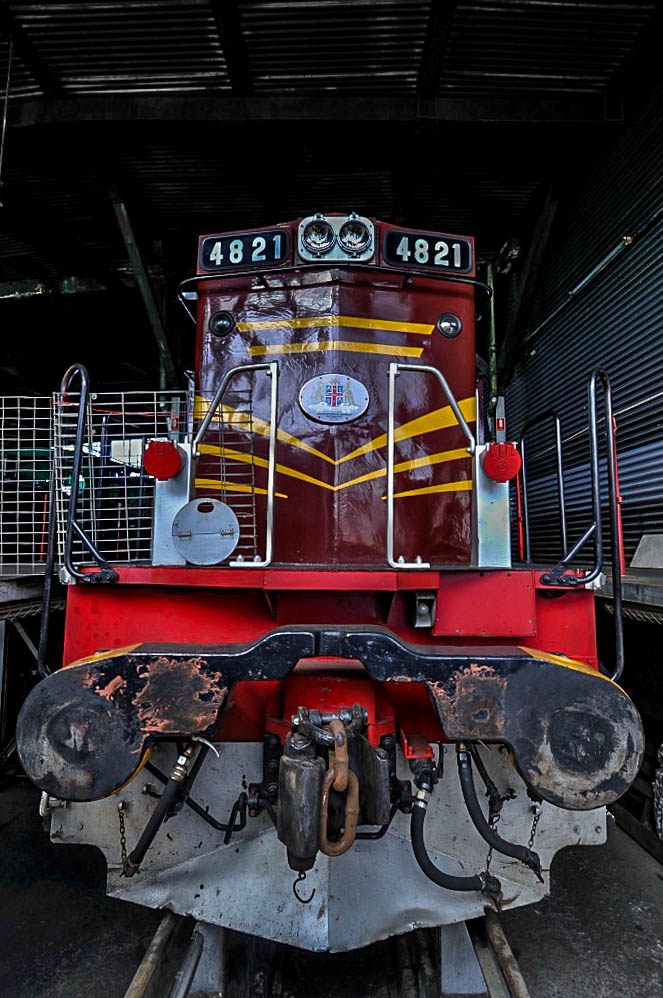
Locomotive 4821

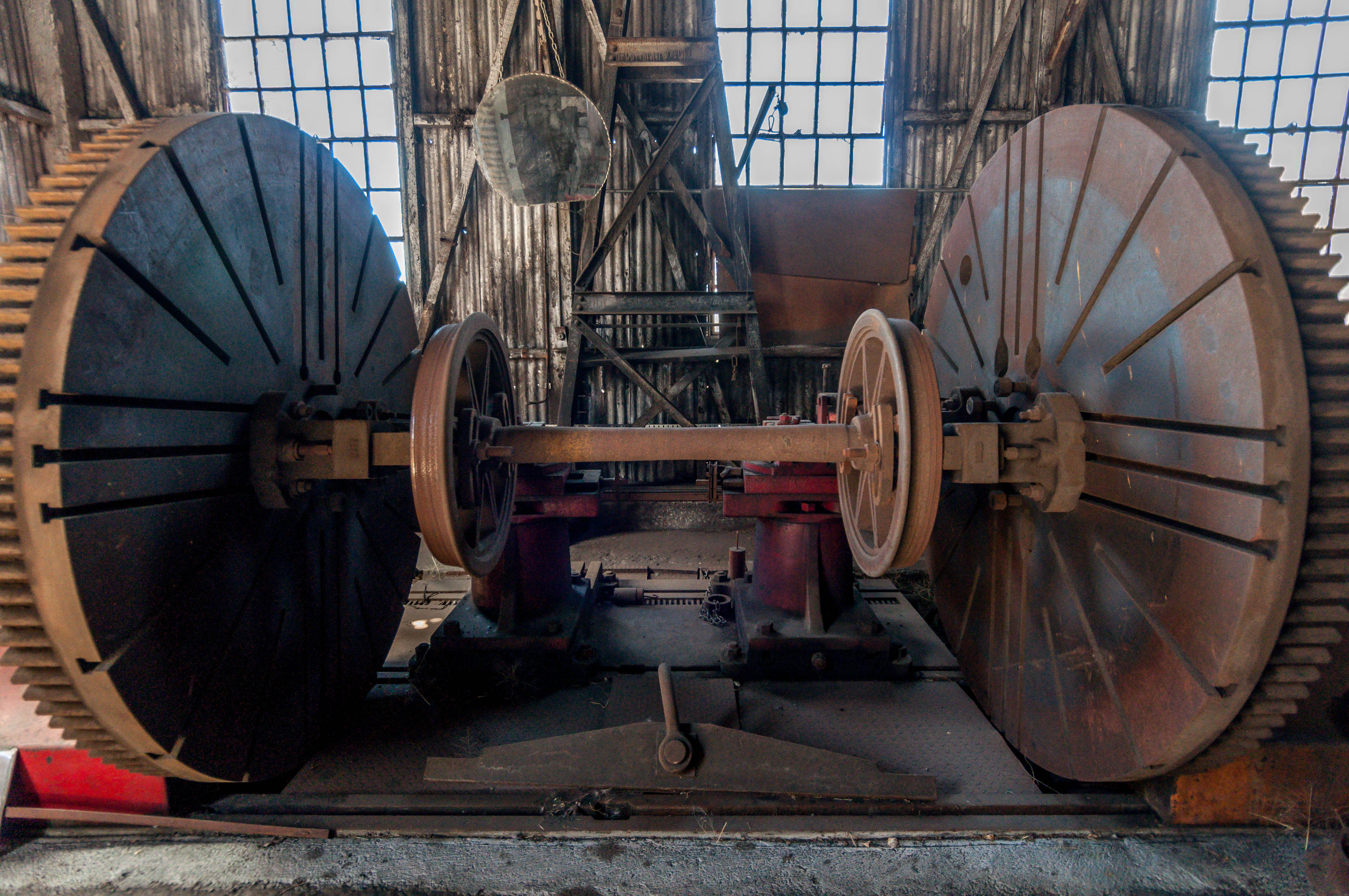
Wheel Lathe

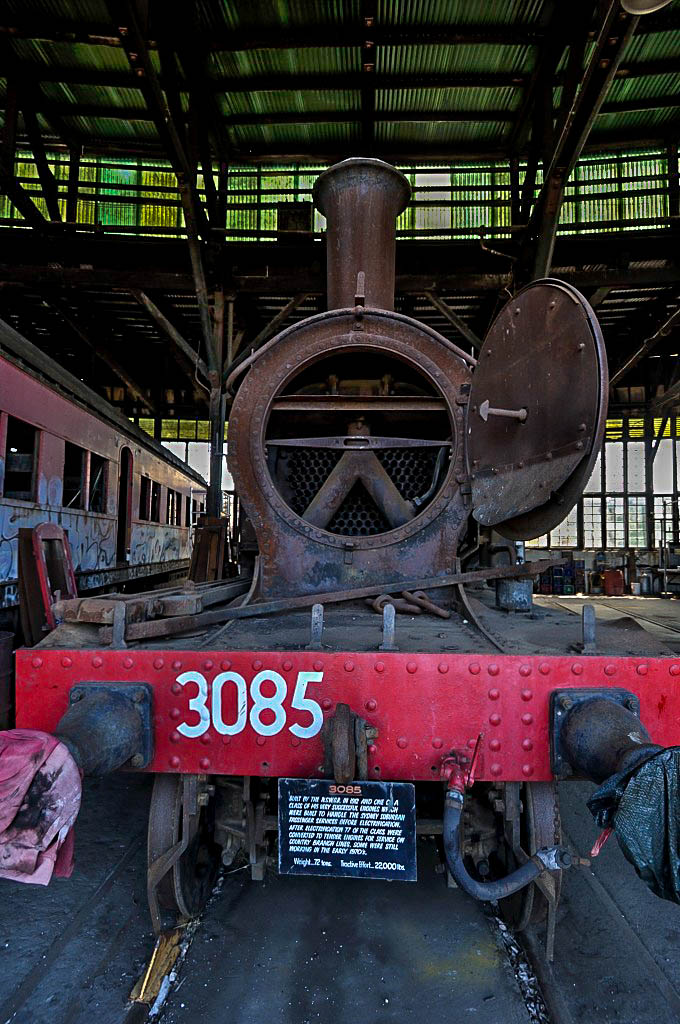
Locomotive 3085

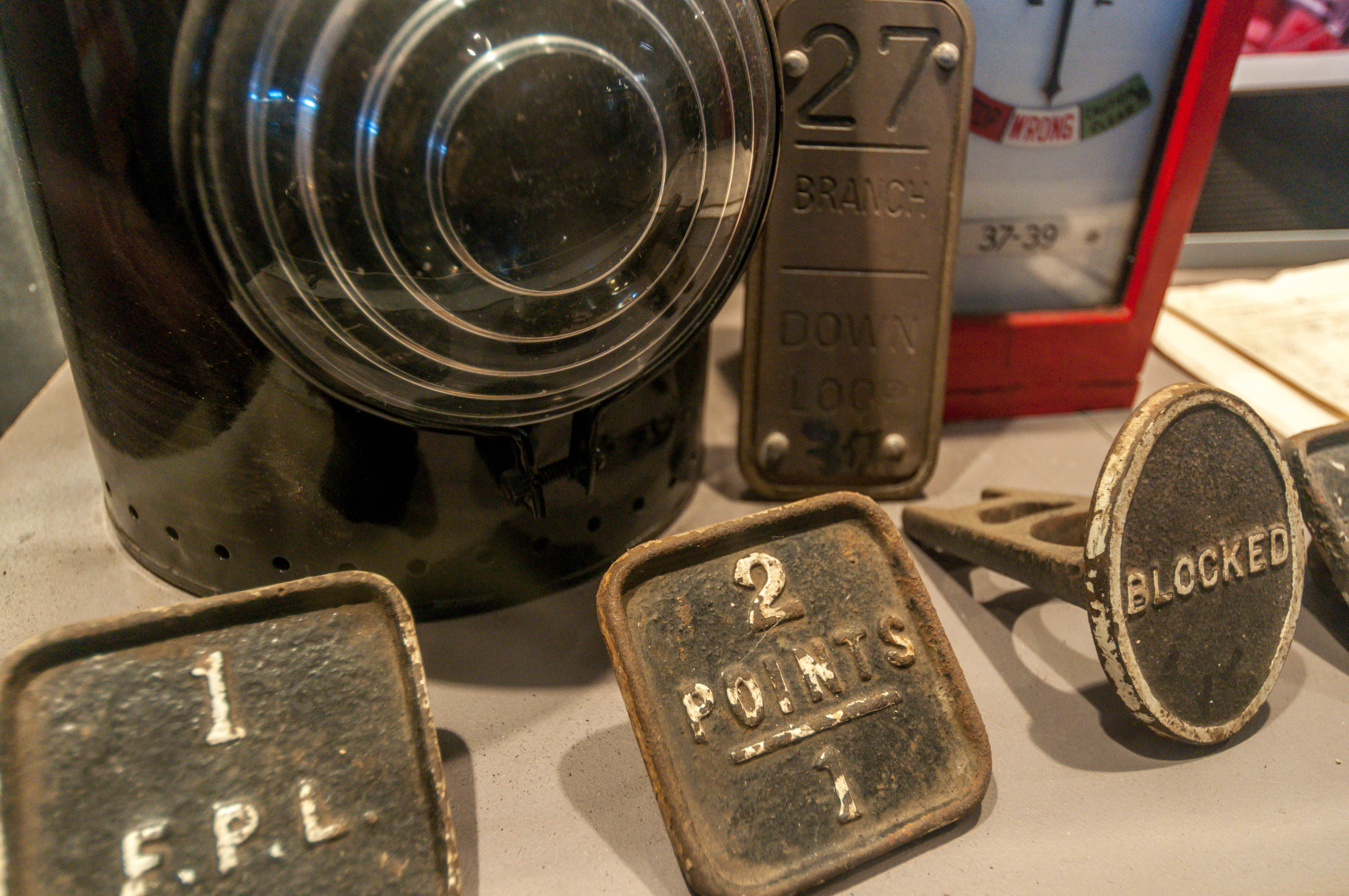
Signalling Display

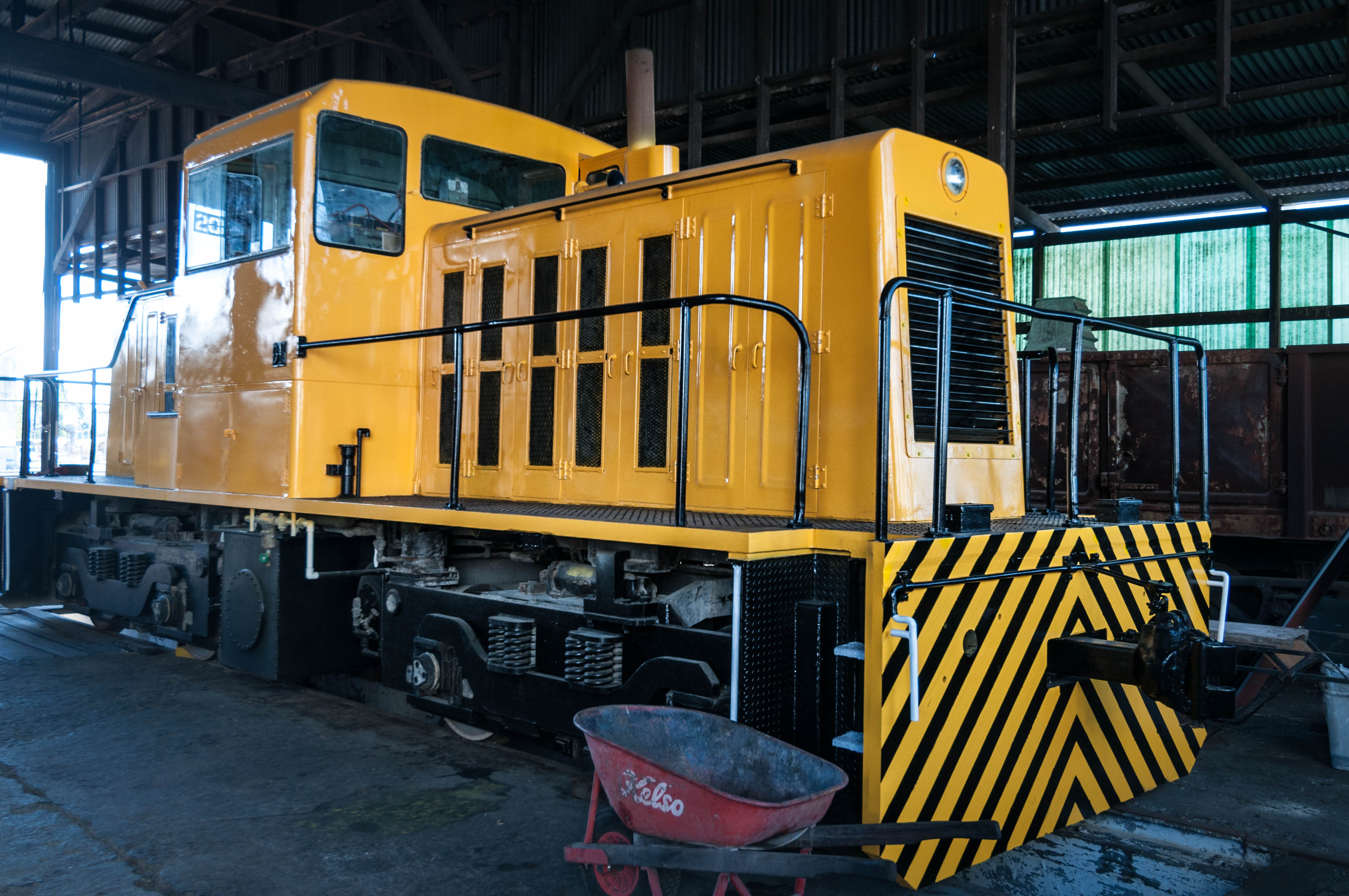
General Electric Bo-Bo L80T

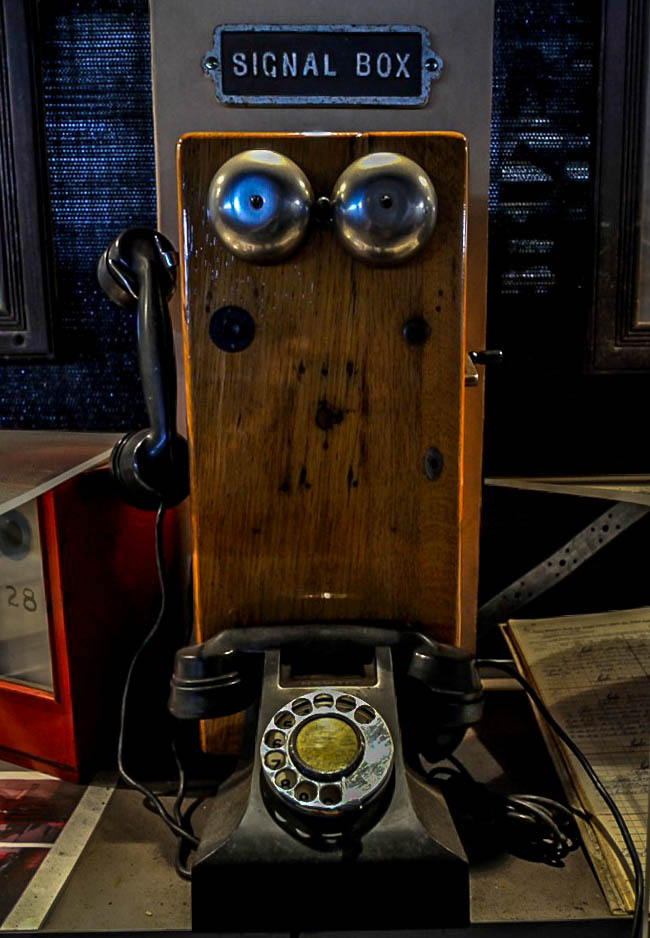
Telegraphy

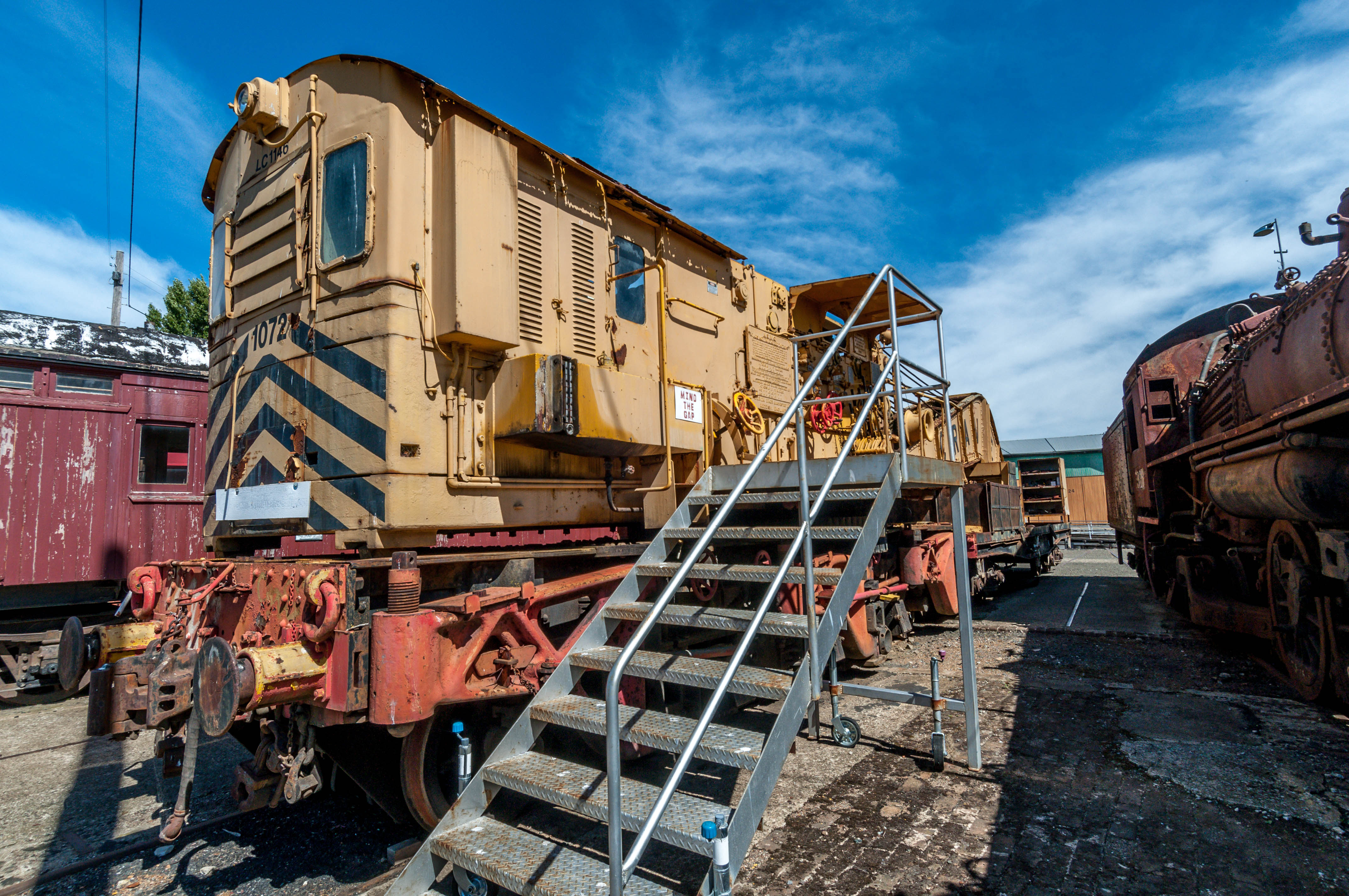
Breakdown Crane 1072

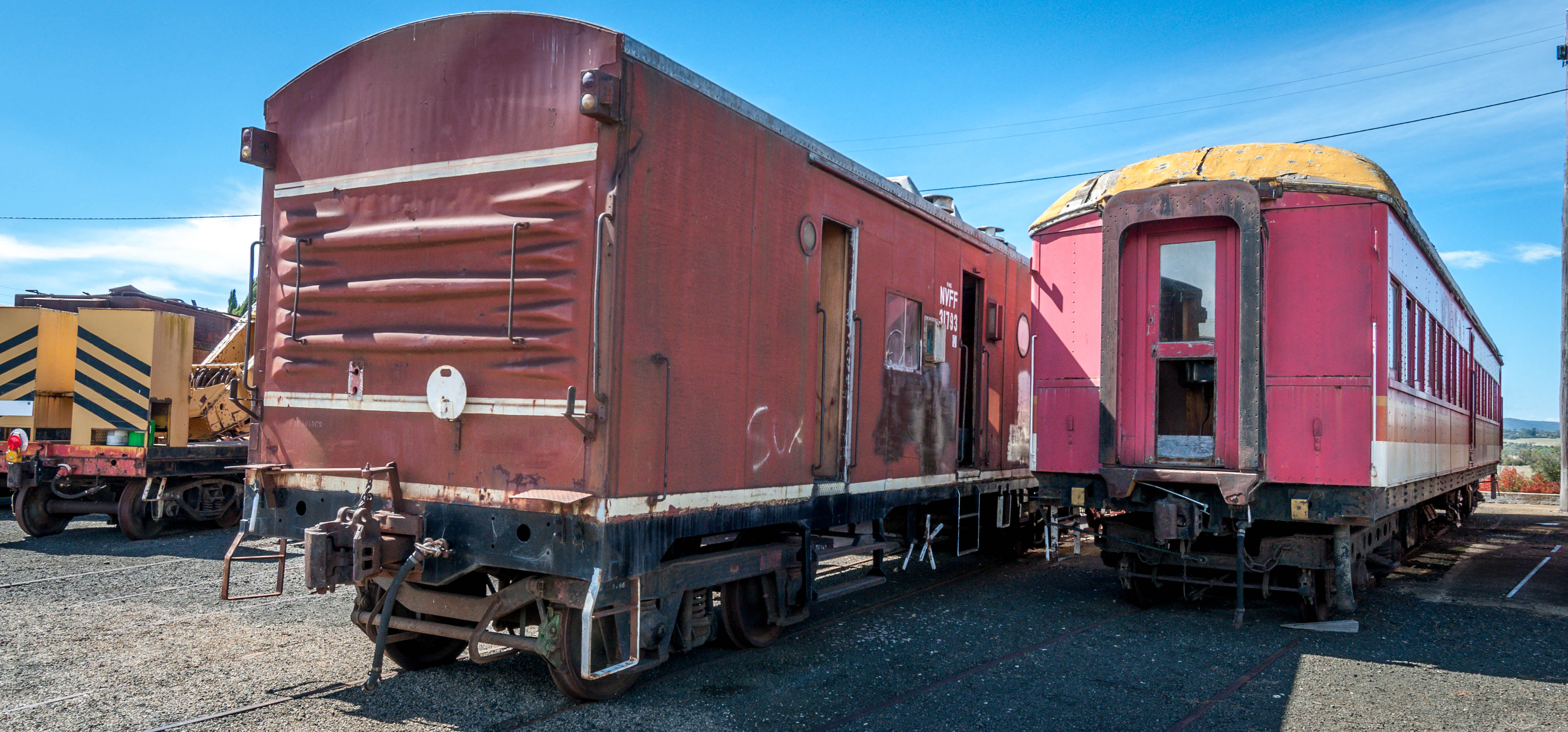
Carriages

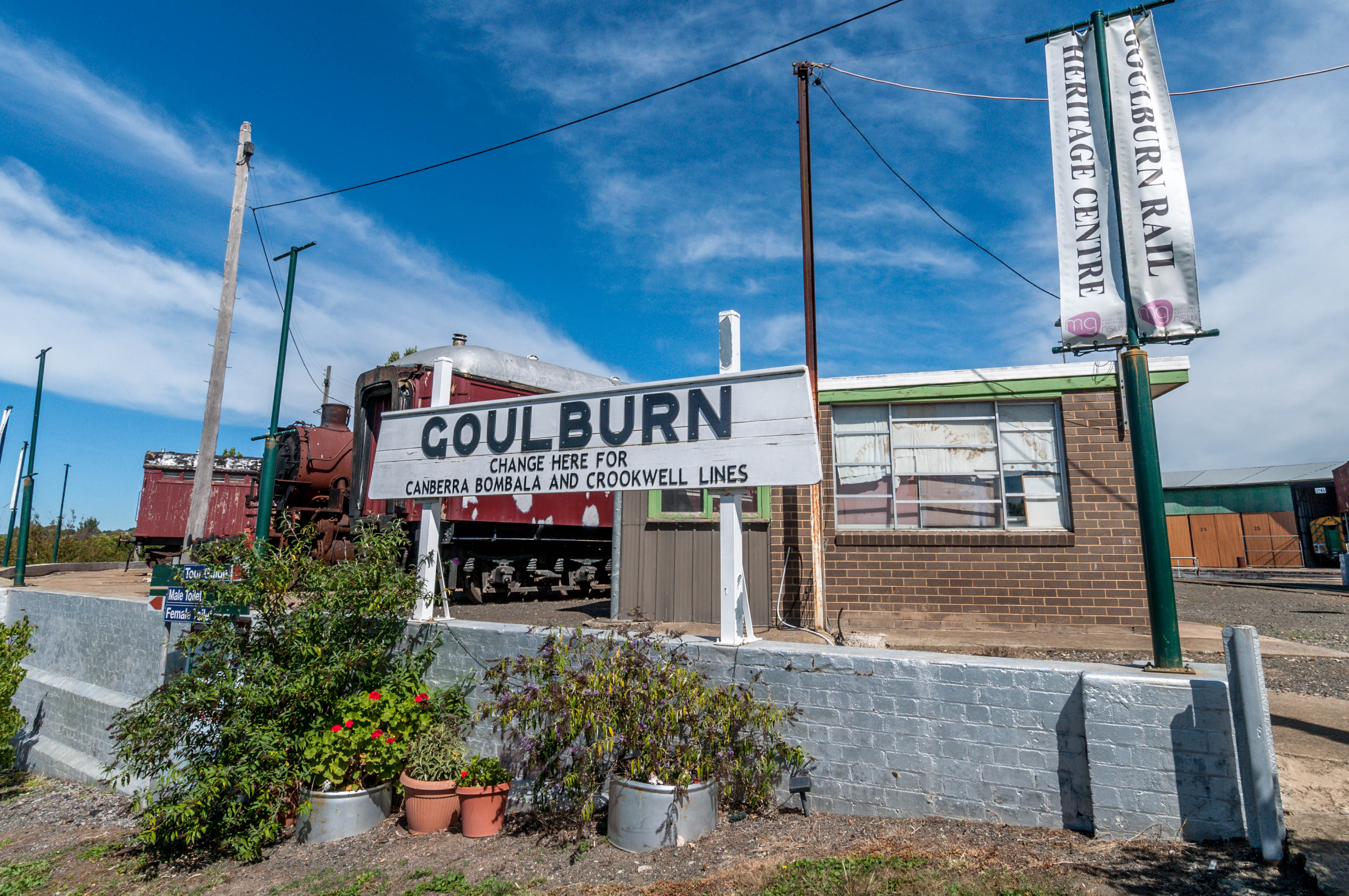
Entrance

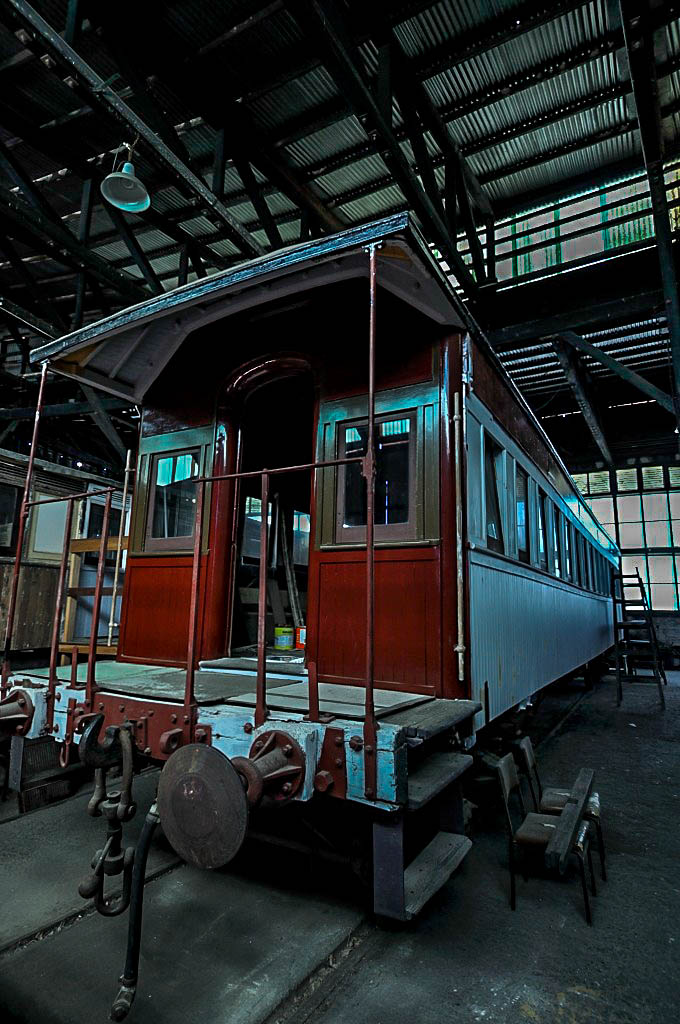
Carriage under restoration

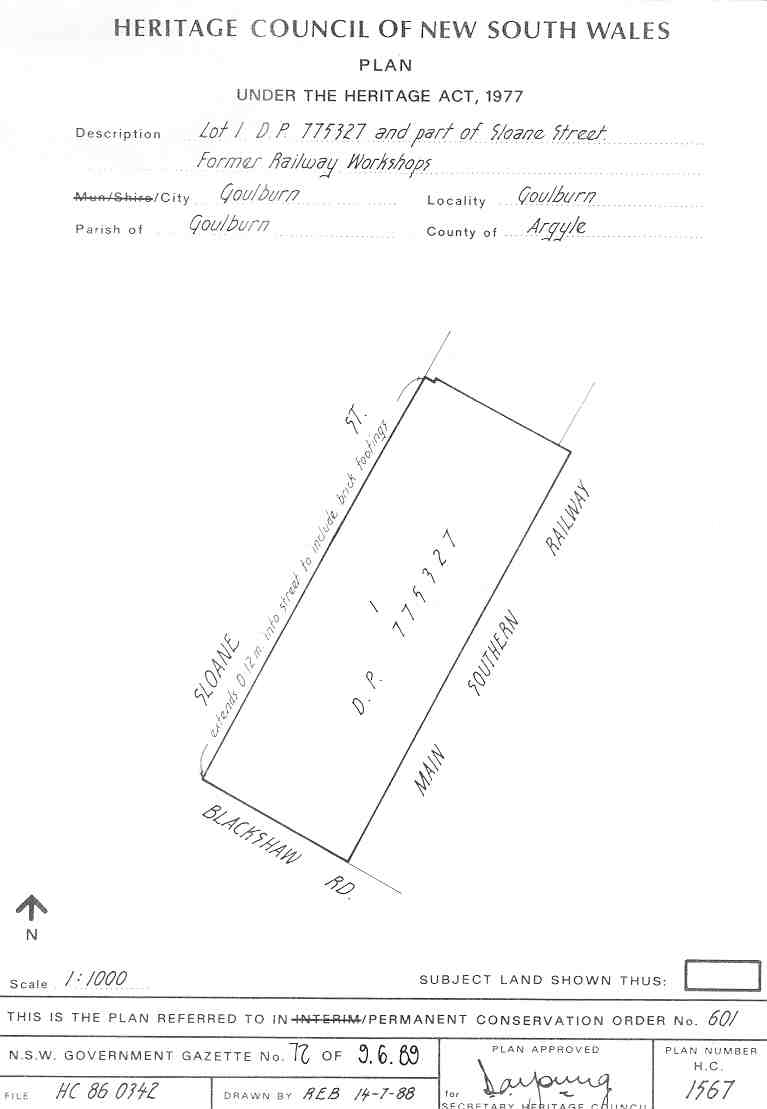
Heritage boundaries
