= Hunter Valley Steamfest =

Train event in New South Wales

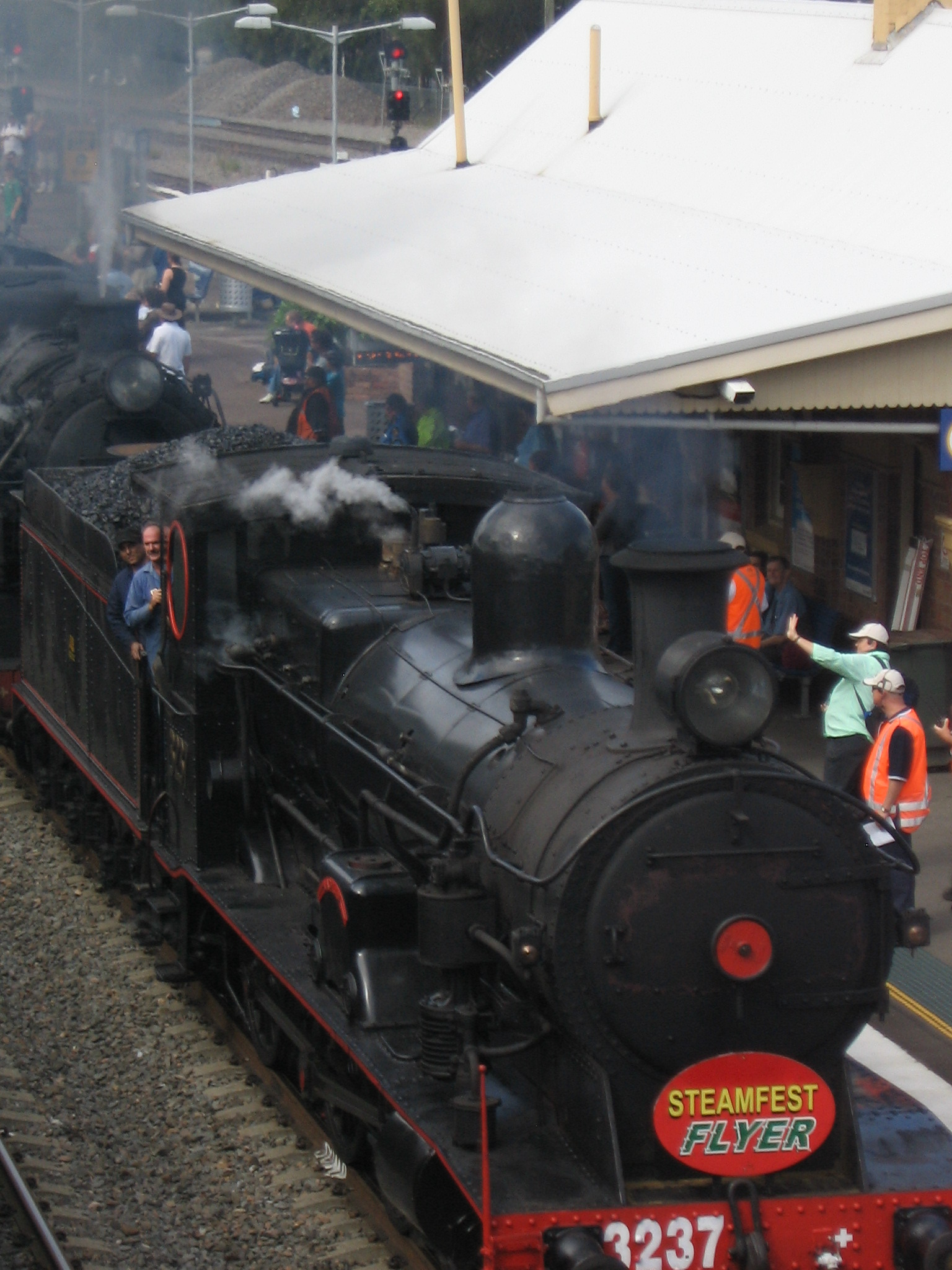
- 3237 at Maitland station in April 2009
- Begins: 17 April 2027
- Ends: 18 April 2027
- Frequency: Annual
- Location: Maitland, New South Wales
- Years active: 38
- Inaugurated: 19–20 April 1986
- Most recent: 18–19 April 2026
- Attendance: 50,000 (2017)
- Website: www.steamfest.com.au

The Hunter Valley Steamfest is one of the major events in the New South Wales steam locomotive season and also one of the major events held in Maitland, in the Hunter Region. Held over two days in April, it is usually attended by steam locomotives from the Canberra Railway Museum, NSW Rail Museum and East Coast Heritage Rail and railmotors from the Rail Motor Society.

== History ==
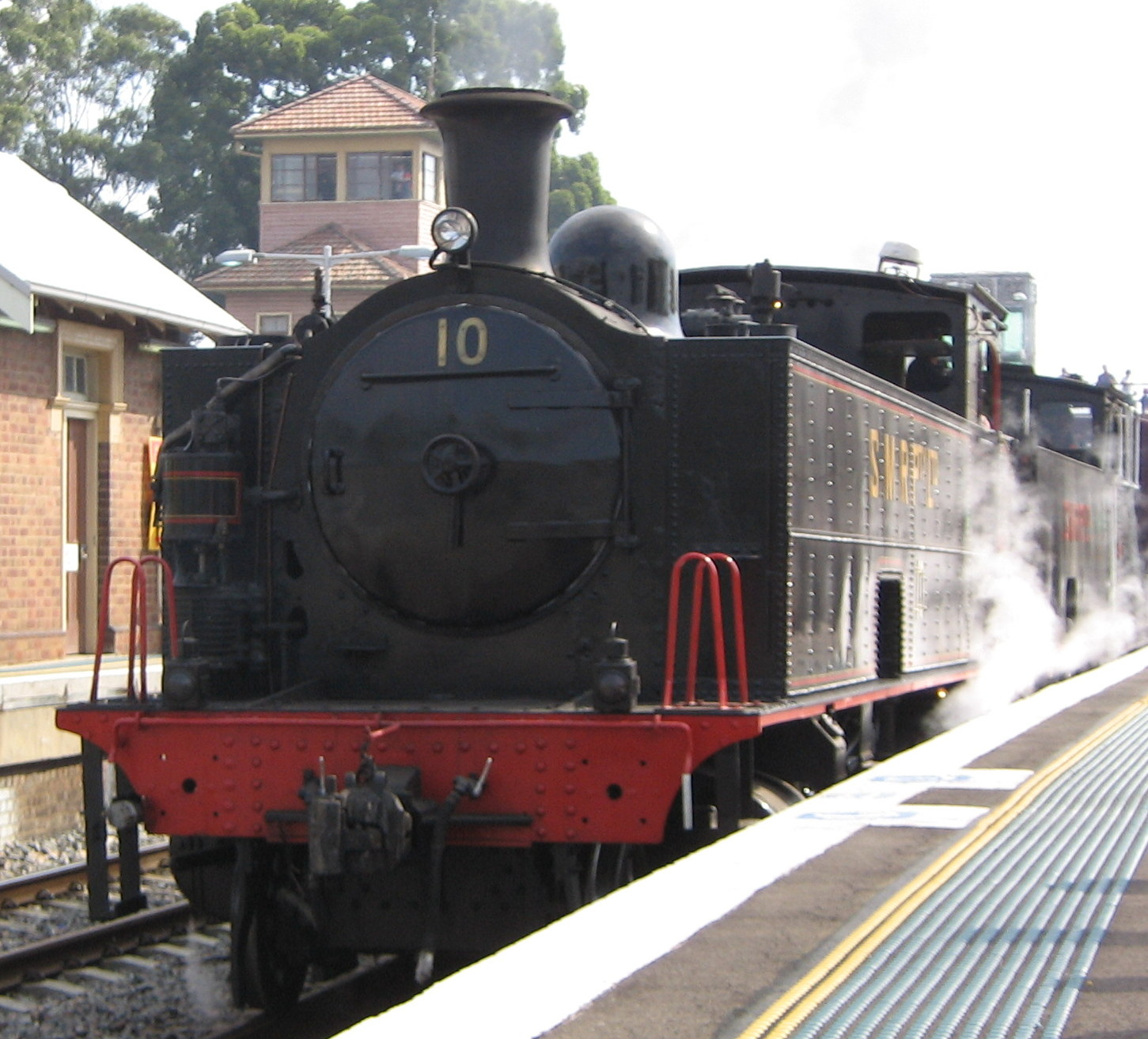
SMR 10 at Maitland station in April 2005

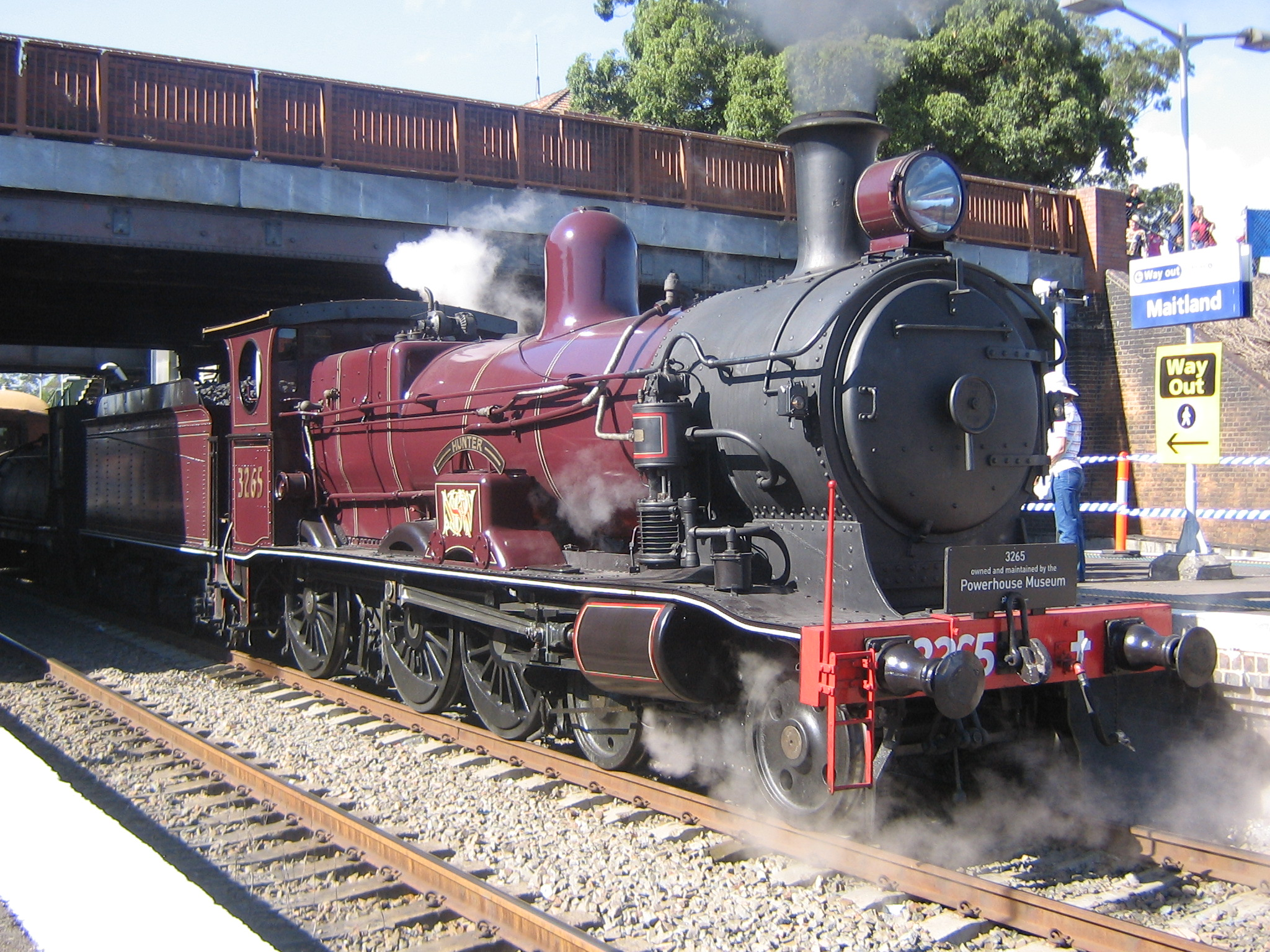
3265 at Maitland station in April 2010

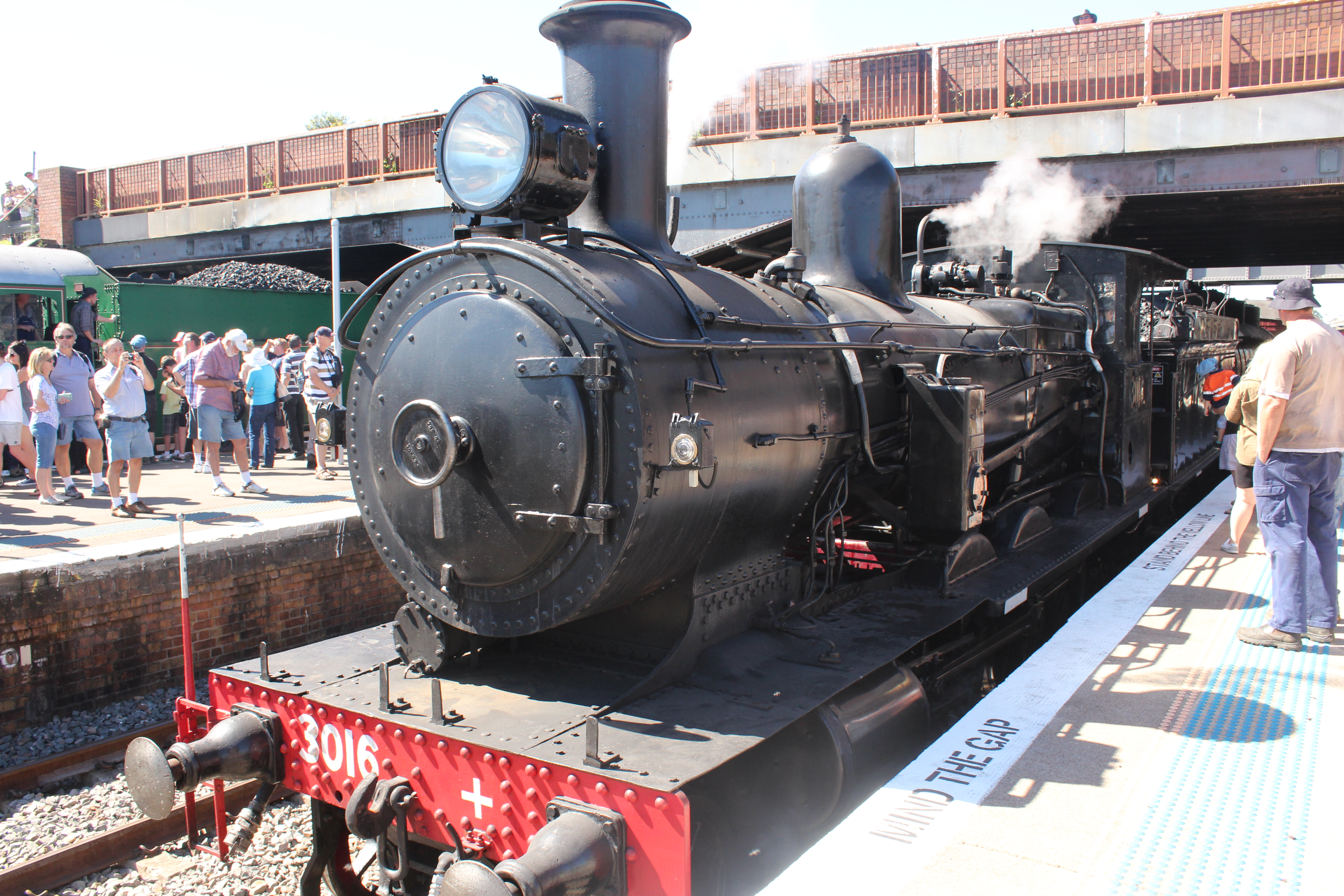
3016 at Maitland station in April 2017

The first Hunter Valley Steamfest was held in April 1986 to commemorate the days of steam, three years after steam operations on the South Maitland Railway ceased. In 2017, Steamfest attracted 50,000 visitors.

The 2020 and 2021 events were cancelled due to the COVID-19 pandemic, while the 2022 event was cancelled due to flooding at Maitland.

== Locomotives ==
Hunter Valley Steamfest has seen different locomotives from over six different preservation organisations within New South Wales and the Australian Capital Territory, including one from the United Kingdom.

This list contains the locomotives that have attended the Hunter Valley Steamfest:

South Maitland Railway

- SMR 10: Steam Display item at South Maitland Rail Yard 1990–95, 2006–07 and Steam trip in 2007, static display at the rally ground 2023
- SMR 17: Steam Display item at South Maitland Rail Yard 1991
- SMR 18: Steam Display item at South Maitland Rail Yard 1991–93, 2007 and Steam trip in 1994–95, 2007, static display with SMR 10 2023 Maitland rally ground
- SMR 25: Display in Maitland railway Yards in 1986 before being moved to Richmond Vale Railway
- SMR 27: Static Display 1987

Richmond Vale Railway

- Marjorie: 1986–2015
- SMR 24: 1990–93, 1995–97
- SMR 25: 1991–96, 1998–99
- SMR 30: 2000, 2003, 2005–09

Ex New South Wales Government Railways

- 3001: NSW Rail Museum – 1986, 1988
- 3016: Canberra Railway Museum – 2013, 2016, NSW Rail Museum – 2017
- 3112: Barry Tulloch – 1988–89, 1992, 1994–96, 2002–07
- 3237: Lachlan Valley Railway – 2009, 2015
- 3265: Powerhouse Museum – 2010–14, 2019, 2025, 2026
- 3526: NSW Rail Museum – 2007–12, 2019, 2024, 2025, 2026
- 3642: NSW Rail Museum – 1986–87, 1990–92, 2008–18
- 3801: East Coast Heritage Rail – 1987, 1989–98, 2000–2006, NSW Rail Museum – 2007, 2023
- 3830: Powerhouse Museum – 1998–2009
- 5910: NSW Rail Museum – 1986–88
- 5917: Private Owner – 1986, 2009, 2014, 2016, 2023
- 6029: Canberra Railway Museum – 2016, Private Owner – 2018, NSW Rail Museum – 2023, 2024

Ex British Railways

- 4472 Flying Scotsman – 1989

Ex Victorian Railways

- R766: Private Owner – 2023

== Excursions ==
During the Steamfest, trips to Broadmeadow, Branxton, Singleton, Paterson, Dungog and Newcastle Interchange have been operated by steam and/or preserved rail motors. The Sunday Barrington Bullet used to travel to Dungog, then to Stroud Road loop and return. In 2015, a new trip to Port Waratah, using the balloon loop there, was introduced. A trip to and round the colliery loading balloon loop at Camberwell had been added by 2023.

In the early years of the festival, steam hauled charters brought passengers to the event but this is no longer the case with the locomotives and rolling stock moving to the festival empty. In 1986 two trips from Sydney Central and another from Blacktown operated. In recent years passengers have able to travel on the stock movement from Picton to Maitland, albeit on the Friday before and Monday after the festival.

== The Great Train Race ==
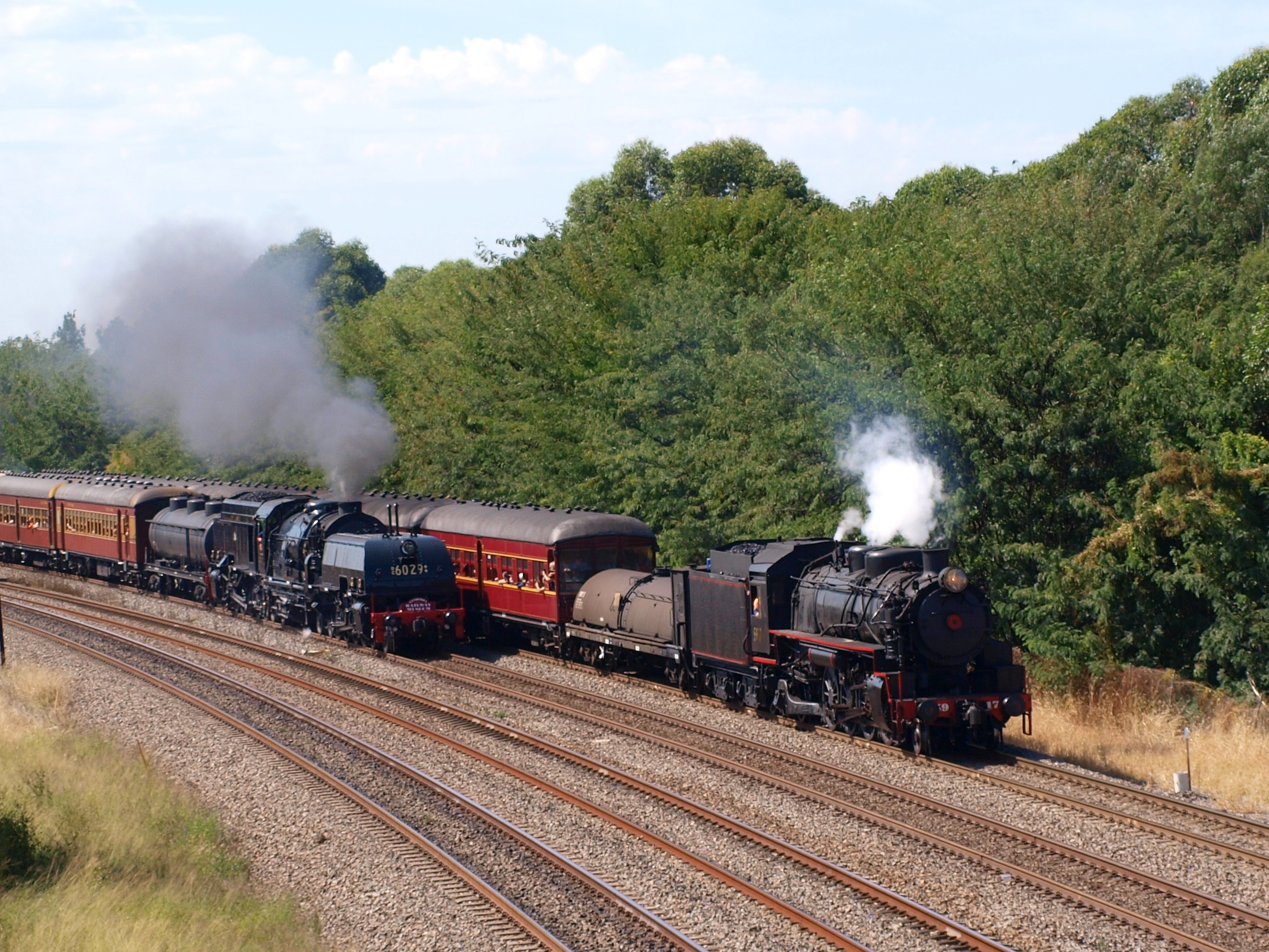
The Great Race 2016 – Leaders

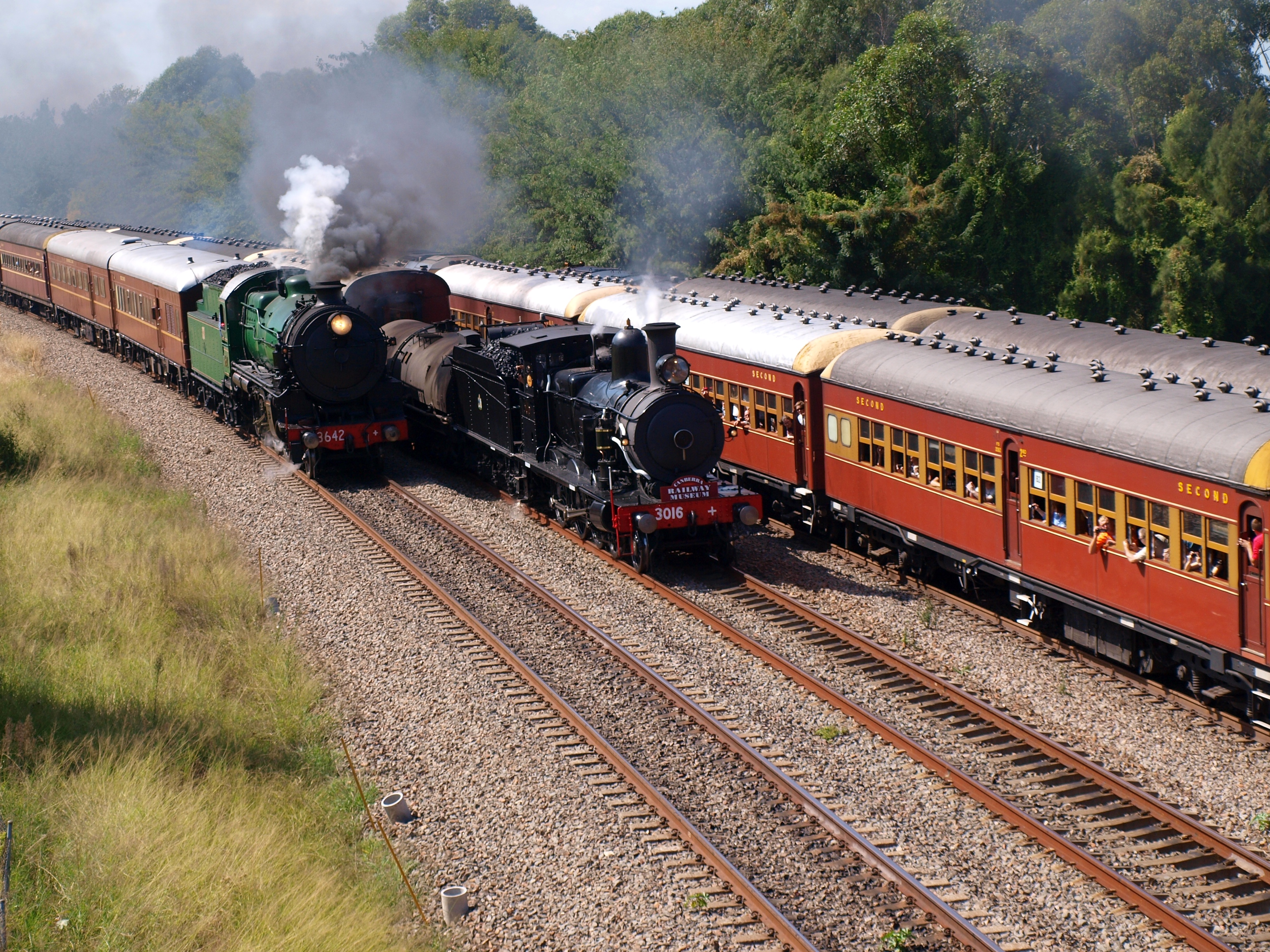
The Great Race 2016 – Outsiders

One of the excursions involves a race between one or more steam locomotives and one or more de Havilland Tiger Moths. In 2010, a triple parallel of 3265, 3642 and 3526 was organised taking months of planning. The locomotives raced against three Tiger Moths and winner of the race was the oldest locomotive in the race, 3265. A Tiger Moth eventually won the race for the first time in 2012. In 2016, the race was between four trains and four Tiger Moths. In 2023, the quadruple parallel run was held again to commemorate the 35th anniversary of Steamfest.

== Related events ==
In 2004, Hunter Valley Steamfest received its own ground at the intersection of Church Street and the New England Highway adjacent to Maitland station. The ground is called Maitland Steamfest Rally Ground and is managed by Maitland Steam and Antique Machinery Association. Steam traction engines and portable steam appliances are stored, maintained and refurbished by volunteers on site. Traction engines are also run onsite and driven on local roads in the Maitland area. Events and displays provided by the association have included traction engines, portable steam appliances and equipment, road steam equipment, mini train rides (provided by the Lake Macquarie Live Steam group), vintage machinery, interpretive tours and static displays. Maitland Steam and Antique Machinery Association also provide event management and catering at Hunter Valley Steamfest and other events hosted at the Maitland Steamfest Rally Ground including Maitland Motor Heritage and Steam Fair and the Annual Postie Bike Rally.

Maitland Park plays host for the "Show 'n Shine car expo" where hundreds of vintage, veteran and classic cars are on display. The car expo is held on the Sunday during Steamfest.

As part of Steamfest, the Richmond Vale Railway Museum south of Kurri Kurri was open to the public until 2012 with tours provided on the museum's own operational steam locomotive and with other steam related machines on site.
