= 3112 =

Preserved NSWGR C30 class 4-6-4T locomotive

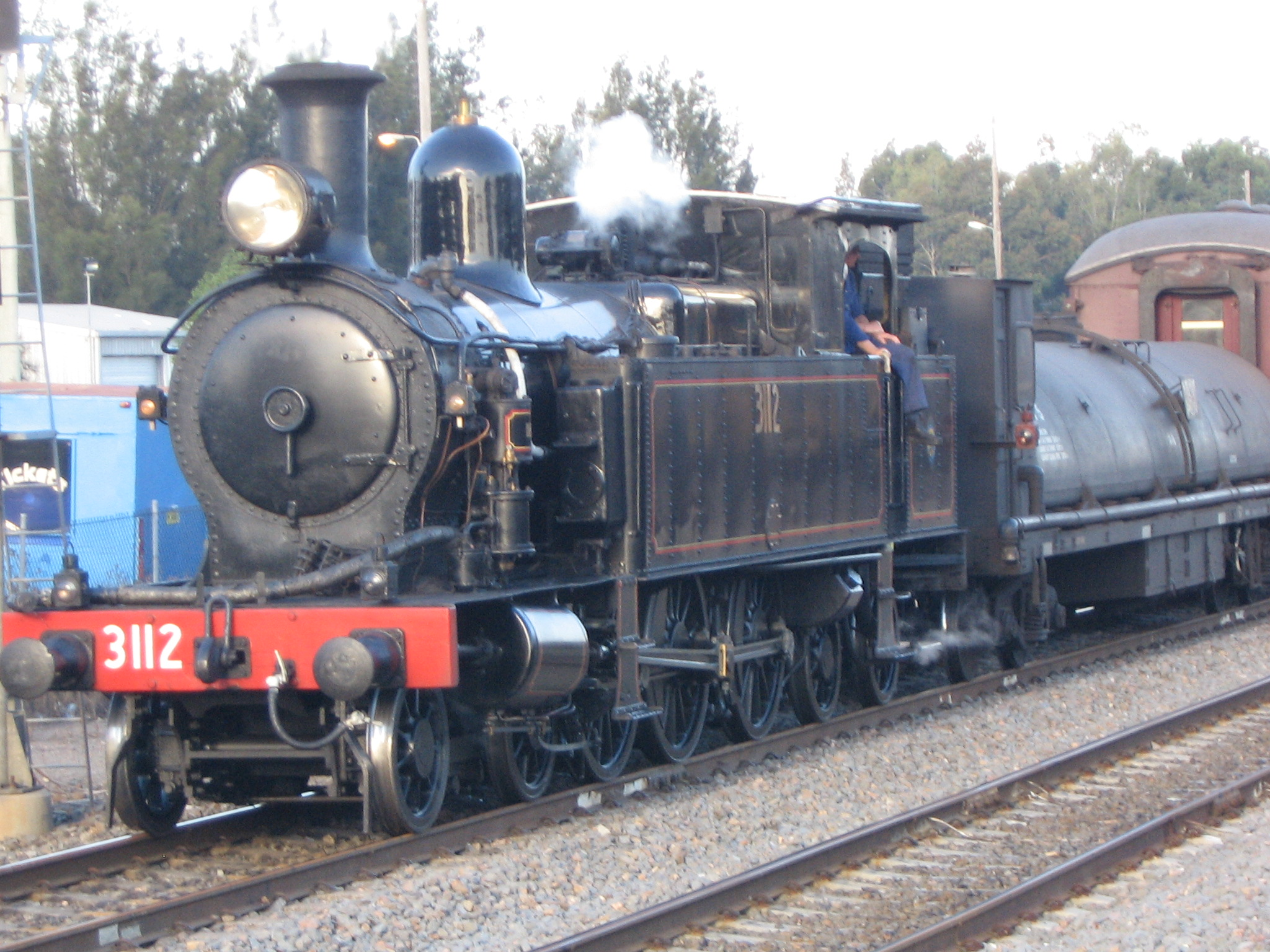
- 3112 at the Hunter Valley Steamfest in April 2007
Type and origin
- Power type: Steam
- Builder: Beyer, Peacock & Company
- Serial number: 5807
- Build date: 1914
Specifications
- Configuration
  - Whyte: 4-6-4T
  - UIC: 2′C2′ nt
- Gauge: 1,435 mm (4 ft 8 1/2 in) standard gauge
- Driver dia.: 4 ft 7 in (1,397 mm)
- Loco weight: 161,000 lb (73.0 t; 71.9 long tons)
- Fuel type: Coal
- Firebox
  - Grate area: 24 sq ft (2.2 m^{2})
- Boiler pressure: 160 lbf/in^{2} (1.10 MPa)
- Heating surface: 1,450 sq ft (135 m^{2})
- Superheater: None
- Cylinders: 2 outside
Career
- Operators: New South Wales Government Railways
- Class: C30
- Disposition: Under overhaul

3112 is a preserved former New South Wales Government Railways C30 class steam locomotive built in 1914 by Beyer, Peacock & Company, England.

== Construction ==
Built in 1914 by Beyer, Peacock & Company, Manchester, 3112 was one of 145 locomotives of the S636 class of 4-6-4T locomotives built specifically to handle the increasing volume of suburban traffic in Sydney, particularly on the steeply graded Northern, North Shore and Illawarra lines. The S636 class was later reclassified as the C30 class in 1924 and given new running numbers in the 30xx series.

Following the electrification of the Sydney suburban network, 77 of the C30 class locomotives, were converted into C30T 4-6-0 tender locomotives between 1928 and 1933 and which were used to replace older locomotives then working on the lightly laid country branch lines throughout New South Wales. The remaining 68 engines not converted were used on outer suburban services in Sydney, Newcastle and Wollongong, while others ended up assisting on local trains in suburban areas and short country trips.

== In service ==
Entering service in 1914 as S1240, 3112 was used initially on suburban duties around Sydney. It received its present number of 3112 in 1924 as part of the reclassification of the S636 locomotives into the C30 class. Following the displacement of the C30 class from Sydney suburban service by the new electric trains, 3112 was employed on local suburban services from Sydney, Newcastle and Wollongong.

From 1956 onwards 3112 and others were also employed in carriage-shunting duties at Sydney Central along with other members of its class. Previously, two Z26 class locomotives had been employed on this duty, but electrification of the carriage sidings at Sydney Central in 1956 meant that it was too risky to use them since the water inlet on the engines' water tanks was on top of the saddle tank. As side tank locomotives, the C30 class had no such safety restrictions, and so they also took up these additional duties.

3112 was also out-stationed at other yards which required large shunting locomotives, and is recorded as having worked at such locations such as Bathurst.

== Withdrawal & preservation ==
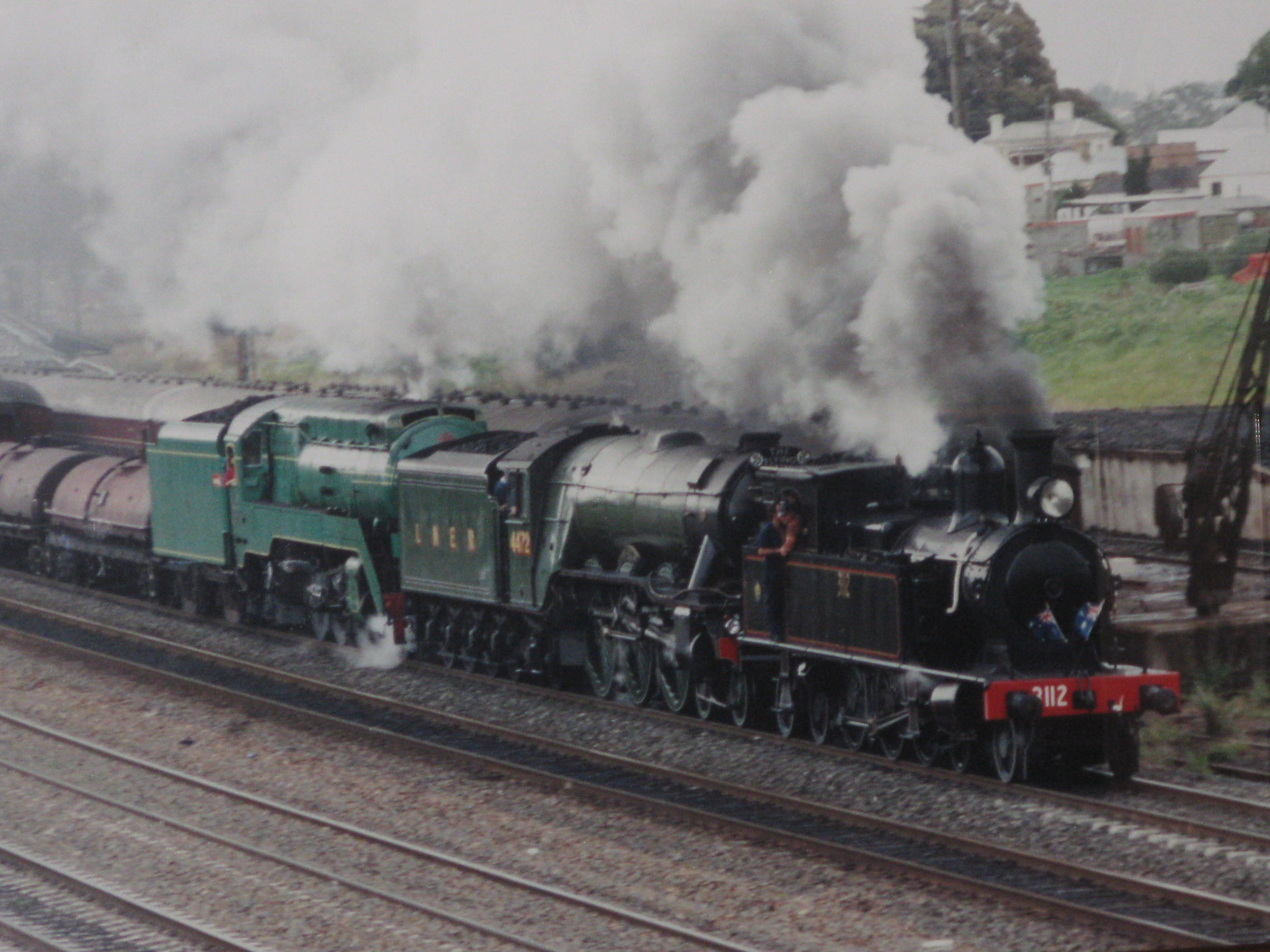
3112 with 4472 Flying Scotsman and 3801 in June 1989

With the arrival of new diesel locomotives in the 1960s, 3112 and the other members of the C30 were deemed to be surplus to requirements. 3112 was withdrawn sometime in the February 1972, and sold to the Lachlan Vintage Village and stored at the Parkes locomotive depot in 1974. It was then relocated to the Lachlan Vintage Village, Forbes along with locomotives, 1919, 5367 and 6042. It was subsequently purchased at auction in November 1986 by Barry Tulloch.

Following the purchase, it was moved by road and rail to the Lachlan Valley Railway's Cowra Locomotive Depot on 21 December 1986. Barry Tulloch, with the help of Ian MacDonald and 37 likeminded enthusiasts, restored 3112 to a running condition.

It left Cowra on 26 January 1988, and came to Sydney via Harden to its new home at Eveleigh Railway Workshops. Restoration continued on many ancillary items throughout 1988, as well as extra refinements to equip it to run excursion trains.

With 3112's return to steam, it travelled over many parts of NSW. It attended the Aus Steam '88 event in Melbourne, travelling south in the company of 1210. 3112 was supposed to have left Goulburn, bound for Melbourne early on 14 October 1988, but failed with a hot axlebox that prevented it from departing on time. The locomotive was repaired and later that day, ran south to join 1210 at Albury on 15 October, to continue the journey to Melbourne.

On another occasion, 3112 was one of three locomotives selected to run a triple-headed excursion from Maitland to Sydney with the return run from the Hunter Valley Steamfest. The loco ran with 3801 and 4472 Flying Scotsman during 1989. On the Queen's Birthday weekend of 1989, 3112 assisted 3801 and 4472 from Valley Heights to Katoomba on the 1-in-33 grades.

Between 1988 and 2007, 3112 saw most of its work with 3801 Limited, attending the annual Hunter Valley Steamfest at Maitland and Thirlmere's Festival of Steam, as well as running enthusiast specials to Kiama, Gosford, Moss Vale and other locations in the Sydney area, during which it was sometimes paired with 3801 and 3830. It has also worked with 1210, 3001T, 3016T, 3137, 3526 and 5910. During this time the locomotive was based at the Eveleigh Railway Workshops, home to 3801 Limited, where Barry, Ian and a small band of volunteers attended to running maintenance and statutory examinations.

In May 2007, 3112 was sold by Barry Tulloch to Boyd Munro, who decided to move the locomotive to Canberra to be kept with the rest of his collection in July 2007. The locomotive was then placed in open storage in the sidings behind the Canberra Railway Museum. In February 2015 it moved to CFCL Australia's Goulburn Railway Workshops for an overhaul. It was steamed in August 2018. 3112 will return to service in 2026 as part of The Picnic Train locomotive fleet.

3112 has also appeared on television on at least one occasion. Its most recent was when it appeared briefly in one episode of Series 5 of The Block, during which it almost ran the couples over since their 'magic doors' placed them right on the entrance to Sydney Central station. This was achieved using blue-screen technology and footage of 3112 approaching the platform.

== Bibliography ==
- Preston, Ron; Winney, I. K (1992), 3801 : a legend in steam, Eveleigh Press, ISBN 978-0-646-11931-1
