= 3265 =

Preserved New South Wales C32 locomotive

3265 Hunter
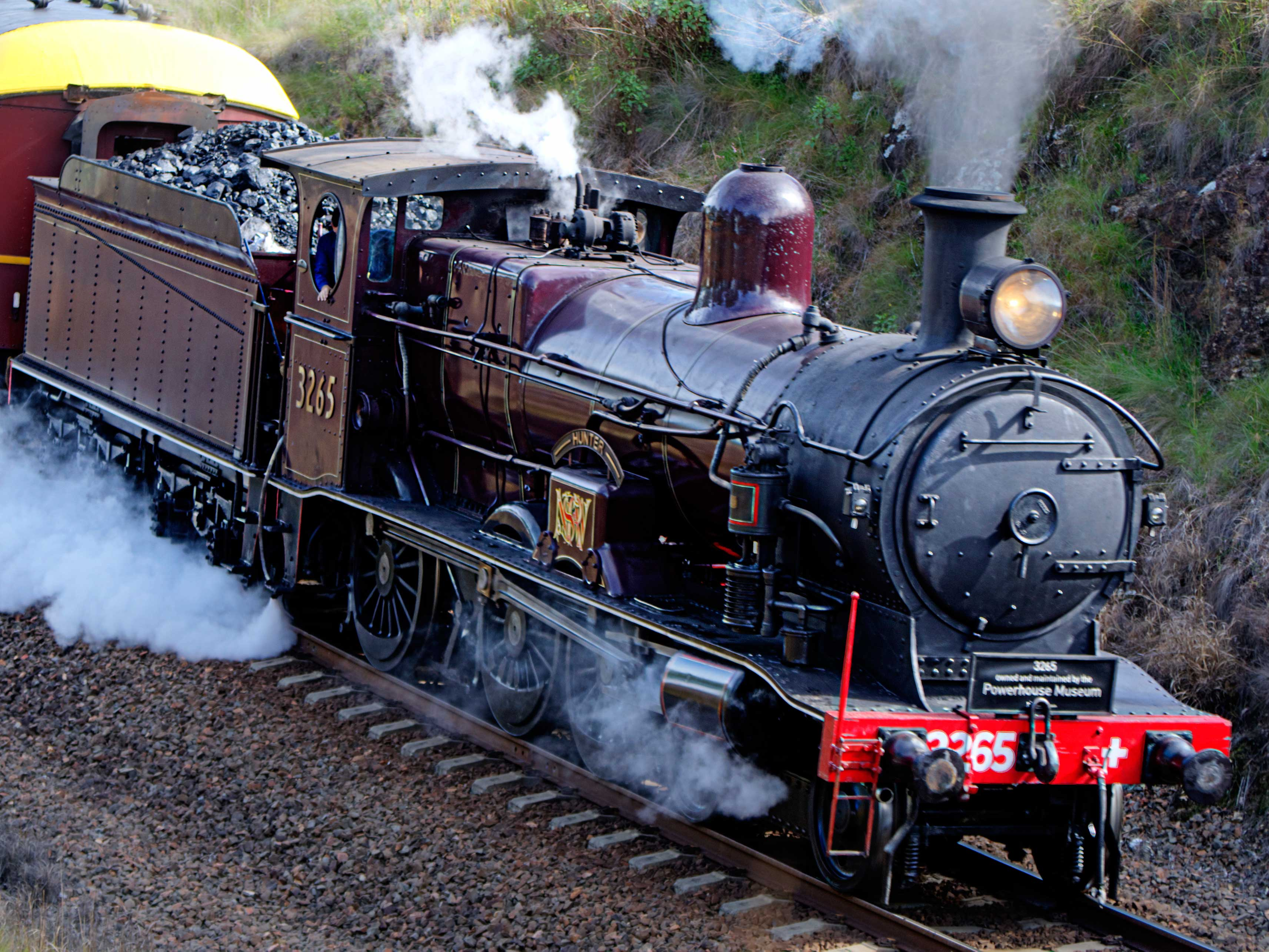
- 3265 at Taree in May 2013
Type and origin
- Power type: Steam
- Builder: Beyer, Peacock & Company
- Serial number: 4221
- Build date: 1902
Specifications
- Configuration
  - Whyte: 4-6-0
  - UIC: 2'C
- Gauge: 4 ft 8 1/2 in (1,435 mm) standard gauge
- Driver dia.: 5 ft 0 in (1,524 mm)
- Length: overall 60 ft 1 5/8 in (18.33 m)
- Axle load: 14 long tons 13 cwt (16.4 short tons; 14.9 t)
- Loco weight: 58 long tons 15 cwt (65.8 short tons; 59.7 t)
- Tender weight: 41 long tons 10 cwt (46.5 short tons; 42.2 t)
- Fuel type: Coal
- Fuel capacity: Coal, 9 1/2 long tons (10.6 short tons; 9.7 t)
- Water cap.: 3,650 imp gal (4,380 US gal; 16,600 L)
- Boiler pressure: 160 psi (1,100 kPa)
- Cylinders: Two, outside
Career
- Operators: New South Wales Government Railways
- Class: C32
- Numbers: P584/3265
- Official name: Hunter
- Locale: Australia
- First run: 1902
- Last run: 1968
- Disposition: Operational

3265 Hunter is a preserved former New South Wales Government Railways C32 class steam locomotive. Built in 1902 by Beyer, Peacock & Company, England, it is owned by the Powerhouse Museum and based at the NSW Rail Museum, Thirlmere.

== Construction ==
3265 was built by Beyer, Peacock & Company, Manchester in 1902 entering service as P584. It was renumbered 3265 in the 1924 renumbering scheme. 3265 is the only surviving member of its class with an original low frame.

== In service ==
The locomotive was first introduced into service painted black in 1902 as a saturated locomotive with slide valves. It was used for express passenger trains. In mid-1933, it was converted to a superheated locomotive with new cylinder and steam chest castings that incorporated piston valves. It was released from workshops in September 1933 and painted maroon and it received the nameplate Hunter, named for the main river in the Hunter Valley. It only carried this nameplate until locomotive 3608 received it in 1934 and took over the Northern Commercial Limited express to Newcastle. The nameplate was preserved by New South Wales Rail Transport Museum (NSWRTM). New reproduction nameplates have been cast and placed back on the locomotive. 3265 was used extensively with carriage sets CUB 80 and CUB 81 for Northern Commercial Express work at this 1933-34 period.

After being replaced in 1934 from this work, it continued to work all manner of trains from express to country mixed and shunting work. It remained maroon and based at Broadmeadow Locomotive Depot from 1933 until 1936 after which it reverted to black livery. 3265 was overhauled and modified many times during its long and continuous service life. The loco was withdrawn from service in 1968 and was moved to the Enfield Locomotive Depot with the rest of the preserved locomotives owned by NSWRTM, Lachlan Valley Railway and other museums. In 1975 it was towed to Thirlmere for storage till 1988. Whilst in storage at Thirlmere, RTM volunteers wirebrushed 3265 and repainted it black.

== Restoration ==
3265 was towed to Eveleigh Railway Workshops in 1988. In 1998, a thorough restoration commenced. Most of the overhaul was carried out by a team of tradesmen working as volunteers and several conservators from the Powerhouse Museum. This team also worked on restoring 3830. 3265 returned to steam, having its first trial run from Eveleigh to Penrith and return on the evening of 2/3 July 2009. It then worked three other trial runs, with one to Springwood and two to Gosford.

== Preservation ==
On 20 September 2009, 3265 was publicly relaunched back into service and made three mainline steam runs to Bankstown celebrating its return to steam after an absence of over 40 years off the rails. Since then 3265 has worked three tours, one to the Robertson's Railway Station Fair, a special charter to Hurstville station and a NSWRTM trip to the Zig Zag Railway along with 3526 and 3642. After this trip, 3265 was transferred to the NSWRTM at Thirlmere.

In subsequent years, the locomotive has taken part in the Hunter Valley Steamfest's 'Great Train Race' from Newcastle to Maitland. The Taree and Gloucester Railway Centenary 2013 and Sydney Great Train Expo 2013 at Central station.

In 2018, 3265 was returned to service after three years of mechanical overhaul, running steam train trips along the Picton–Mittagong loop railway line between Thirlmere and Buxton for the NSW Rail Museum.
