= 3642 =

Preserved New South Wales C36 class locomotive

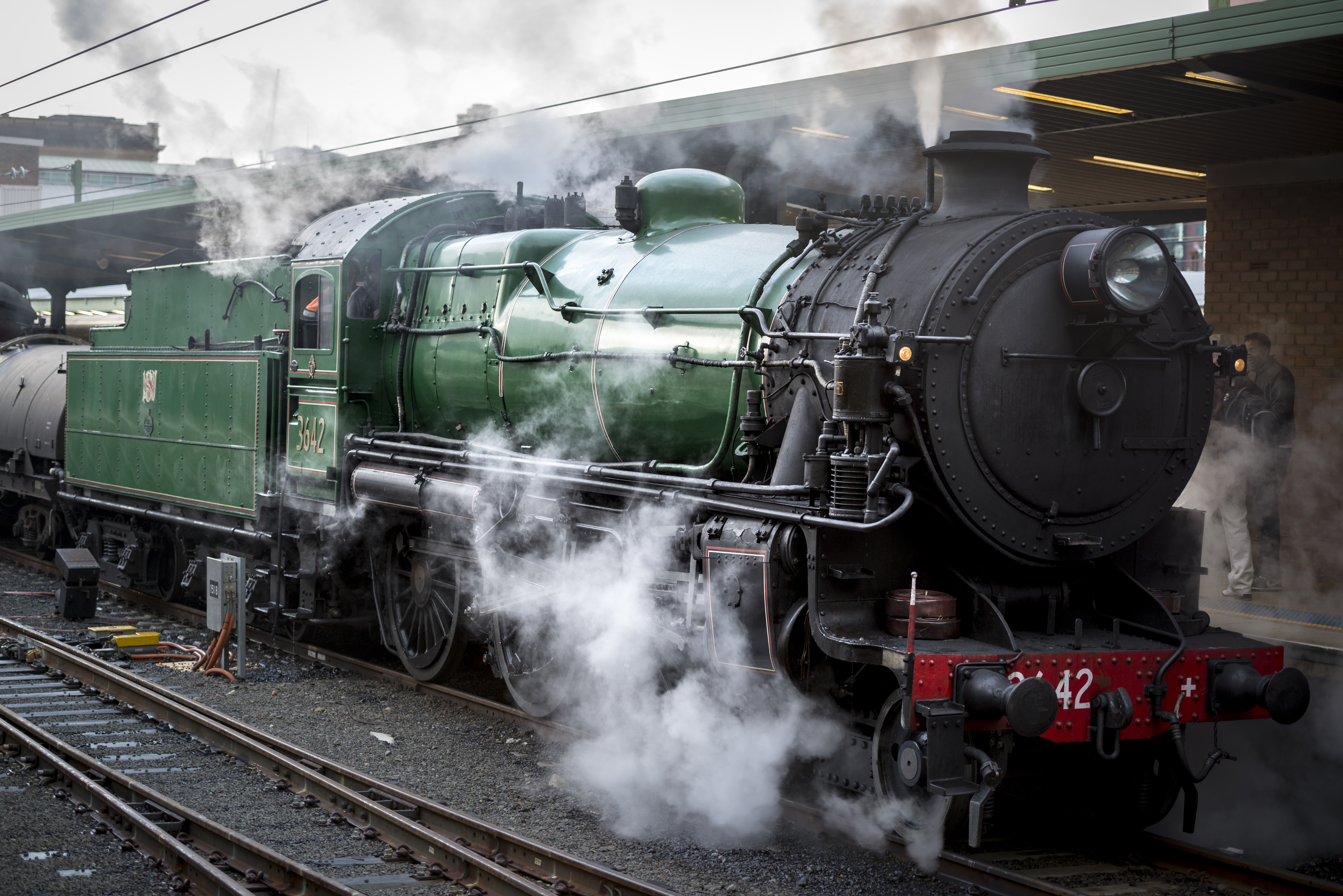
- 3642 at Central station in July 2014
Type and origin
- Power type: Steam
- Builder: Clyde Engineering
- Serial number: 414
- Build date: 1926
Specifications
- Configuration
  - Whyte: 4-6-0
  - UIC: 2′C h2
- Gauge: 4 ft 8 1/2 in (1,435 mm) standard gauge
- Driver dia.: 69 in (1,753 mm)
- Total weight: 160 long tons (179.20 short tons; 162.57 t)
- Boiler pressure: 180 psi (1.24 MPa) later: 200 psi (1.38 MPa)
- Cylinders: 2 outside
- Cylinder size: 23 in × 26 in (584 mm × 660 mm)
Performance figures
- Tractive effort: as built: 30,500 lbf (135.7 kN) as restored: 33,890 lbf (150.8 kN)
Career
- Operators: New South Wales Government Railways
- Class: C36
- Number in class: 42 of 75
- Numbers: 3642
- Nicknames: The Pig, Miss Piggy
- Locale: Australia
- First run: 1926
- Last run: September 1969
- Disposition: Withdrawn for mechanical overhaul

Locomotive 3642 is a two-cylinder, simple, non-condensing, coal-fired superheated, 4-6-0 36 class express passenger steam locomotive built for the New South Wales Government Railways in 1926 by Clyde Engineering. It is one of three 36 class locomotives that were preserved.

== In service ==
3642 entered service in 1926 hauling passenger trains throughout New South Wales. Originally painted black, in the mid-1930s it was repainted green. With the onset of World War II it returned to black. In 1955 it was fitted with a Belpaire boiler. In 1964, it was one of six members of the class to receive power reversing units.

== Demise and Preservation ==
3642 was withdrawn from Broadmeadow Locomotive Depot in September 1969, and placed in the custody of the New South Wales Rail Transport Museum (NSWRTM) in 1970. After being returned to service in December 1970, 3642 worked to South Australia with 3801 as part of celebrations to open the Whyalla line in October 1972. In 1973 the engine was found to have cracking in its firebox and was taken out of traffic pending re-boilering. It was stored at Enfield Locomotive Depot, being hauled to by 5910 to Thirlmere with the rest of the collection in June 1975.

In 1979, 3642 was transferred to Goulburn Roundhouse to be overhauled. The work was funded by the State Rail Authority who upon its return to service in November 1981, operated the locomotive on heritage trains throughout New South Wales with maintenance contracted to the NSWRTM. In 1986, it ran to Melbourne for The Phantom of the Opera which included a parallel run with Victorian locomotive R766. In 1989 it reverted to the custody of the NSWRTM.

In 1992, it again visited Victoria with 5910 to celebrate 30 years of the standard gauge line to Melbourne. In the December 1994 issue of Railway Digest magazine, a photograph of 3642 was accompanied by a caption stating that the locomotive had been withdrawn from service following the failure of an ultrasonic test on the rear driving axle and that there were no plans to repair the locomotive at that stage.

After failing its boiler inspection in 1996, it became a static exhibit at Thirlmere. In 2006 work commenced to restore 3642 and in March 2008 it returned to service. At the end of 2008, a project to repaint the engine began. The project was completed in 2010.

Prior to 3642's return to traffic in 2012, 3642 appeared at the Hunter Valley Steamfest after a 16-year absence in 2008. In July 2011, 3642 was taken out of service for a re-tyre of the all driving wheels and a small mechanical overhaul returning to service in April 2012.

From 2012 to 2018, 3642 had operated on the Thirlmere railway museum on shuttles to either Picton or Buxton or on mainline trips around New South Wales, but the locomotive has also appeared at day out with Thomas events from 2012 to 2018, 3642 during day out with Thomas events plays Henry although 3642's stablemate 2705 used to play Henry from 2009 up to 2012 which resulted in 3642 assuming the role of Henry during day out with Thomas events. The Locomotive remained active for many years up until 2018.

In July 2018, 3642 was withdrawn from active service. It has been maintained in operational condition. In June 2019 it was hauled to Sydney for display at the Transport Heritage Expo. In 2023, the engine would return to traffic; the engine now wears a black livery to replace its previous green livery. However 3642 is now only restricted to run on special occasions since it ran for a limited time back In 2023.

== Gallery ==
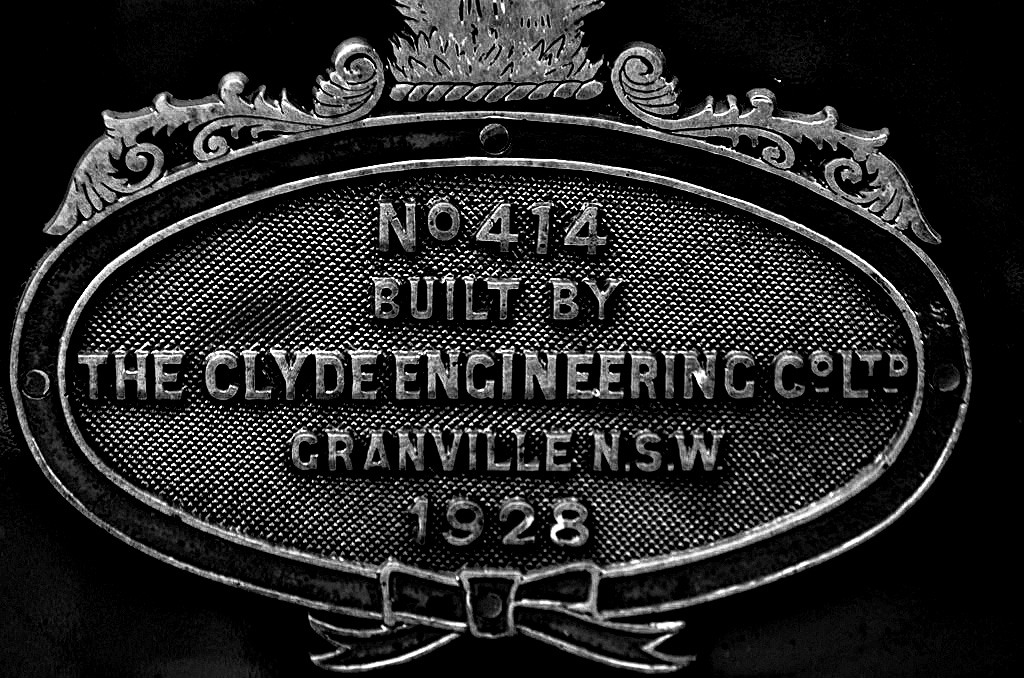
Builder's plate

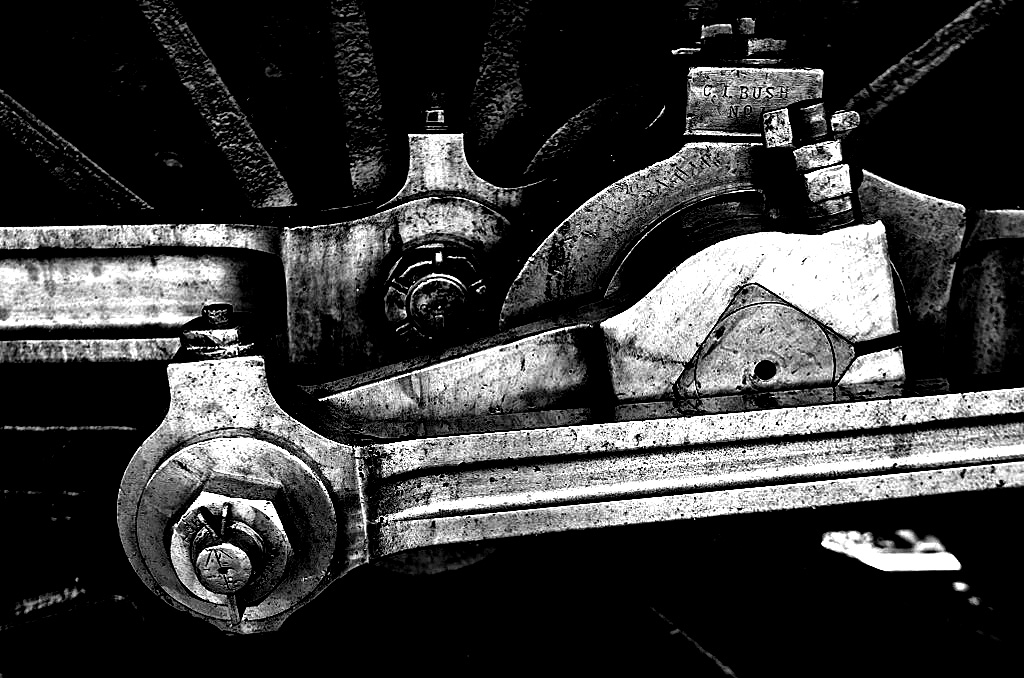
Crank

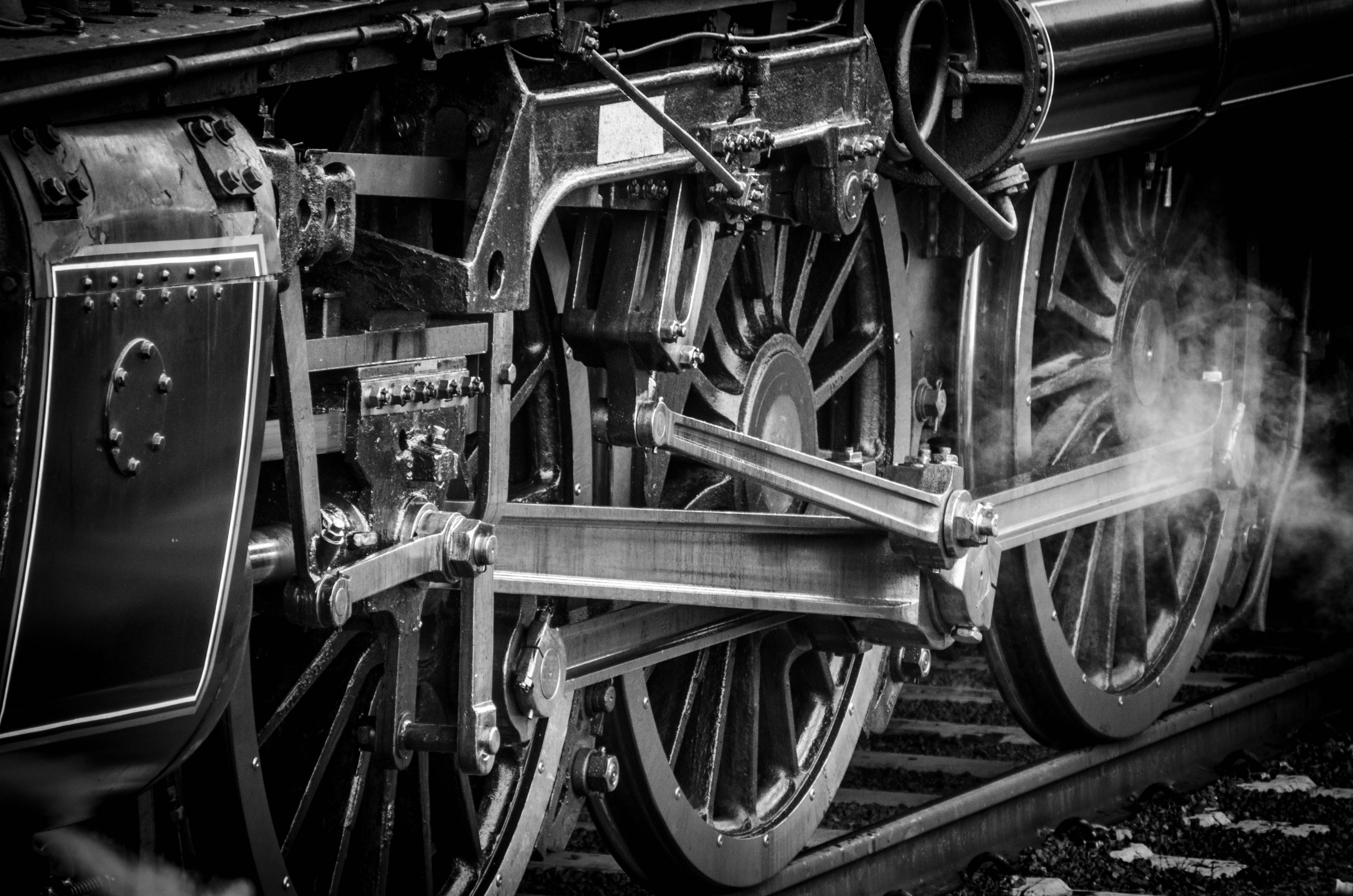
Driving Gear

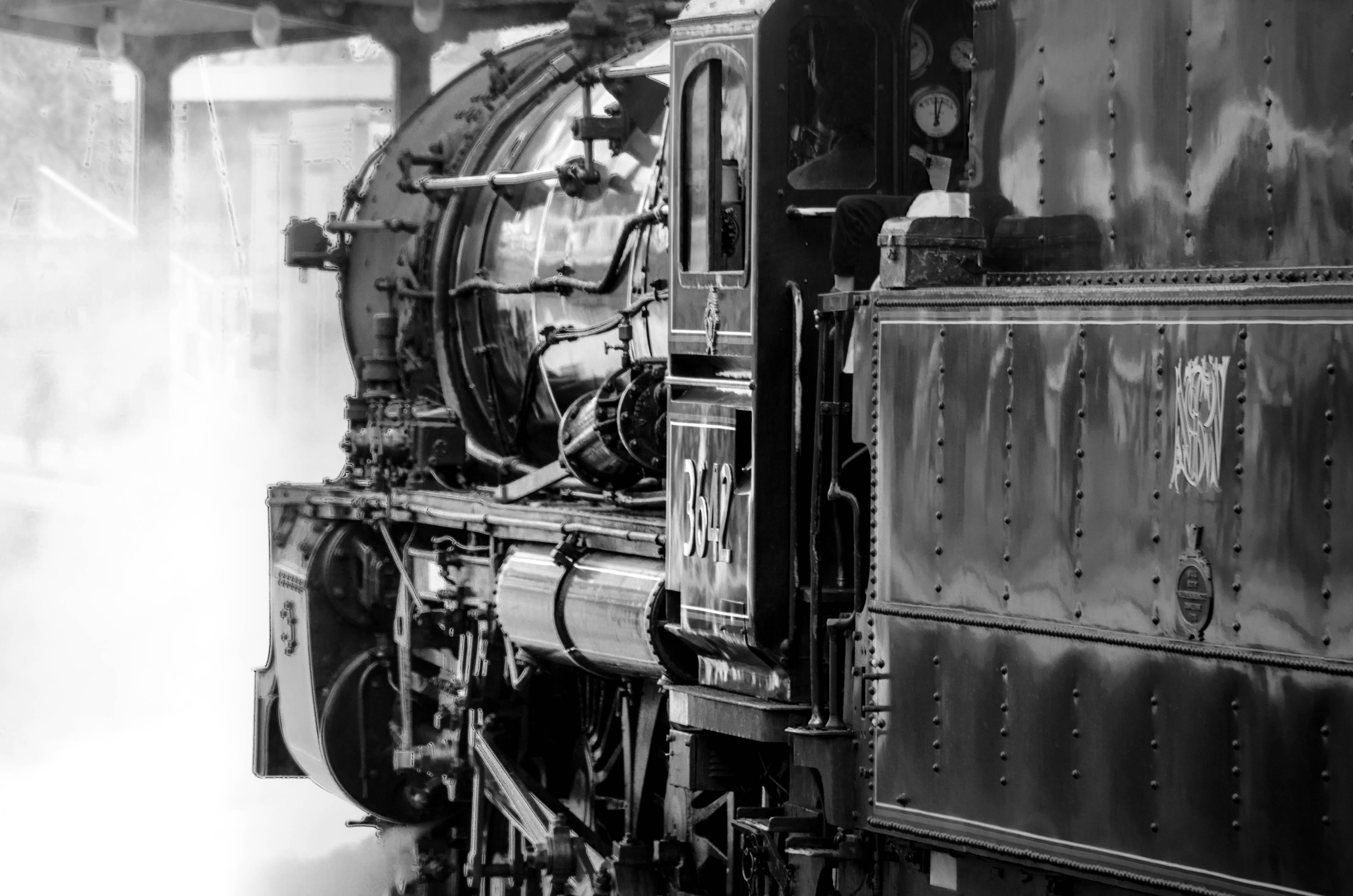
3642 at Central station

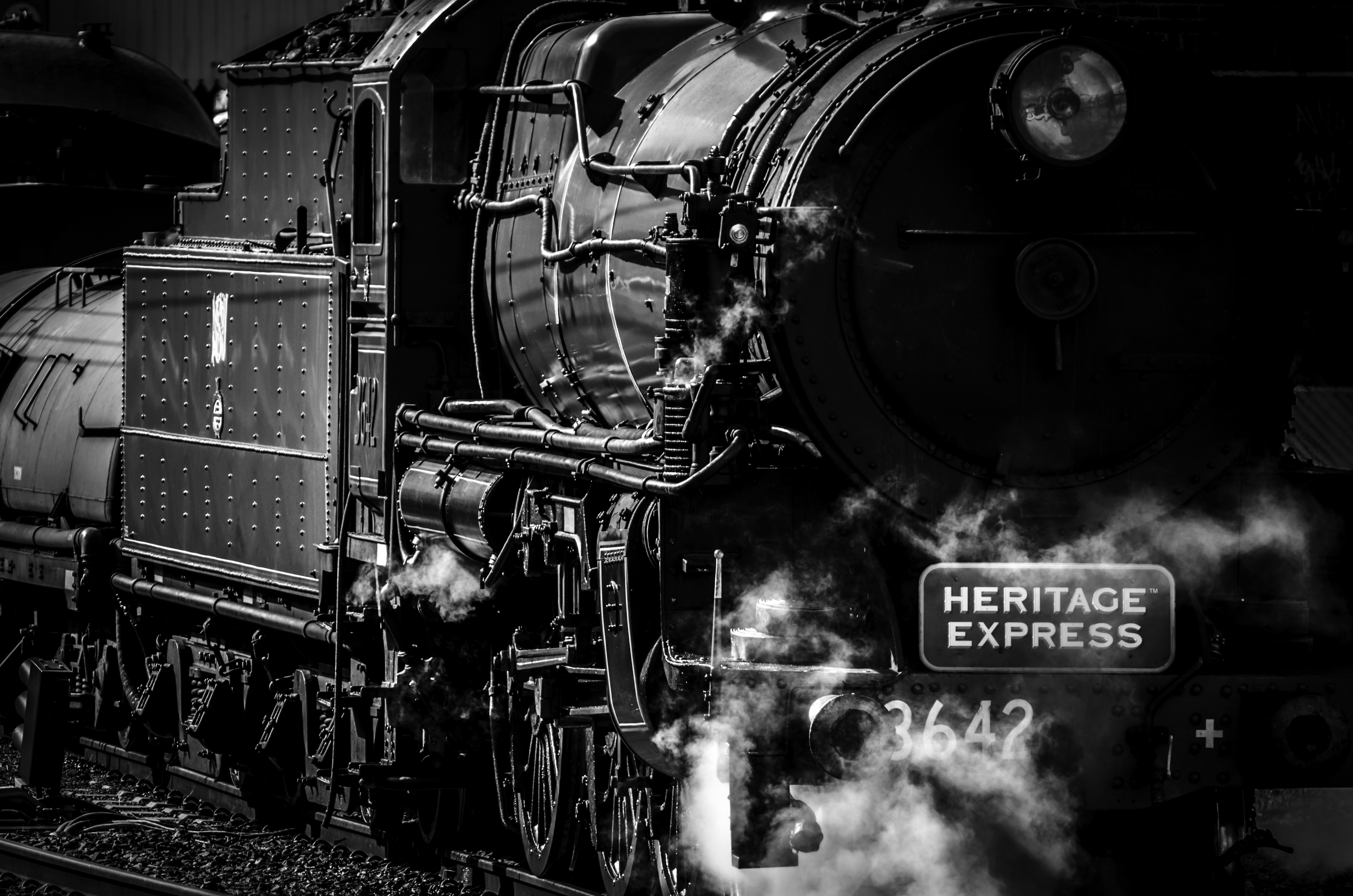
3642 at Central station

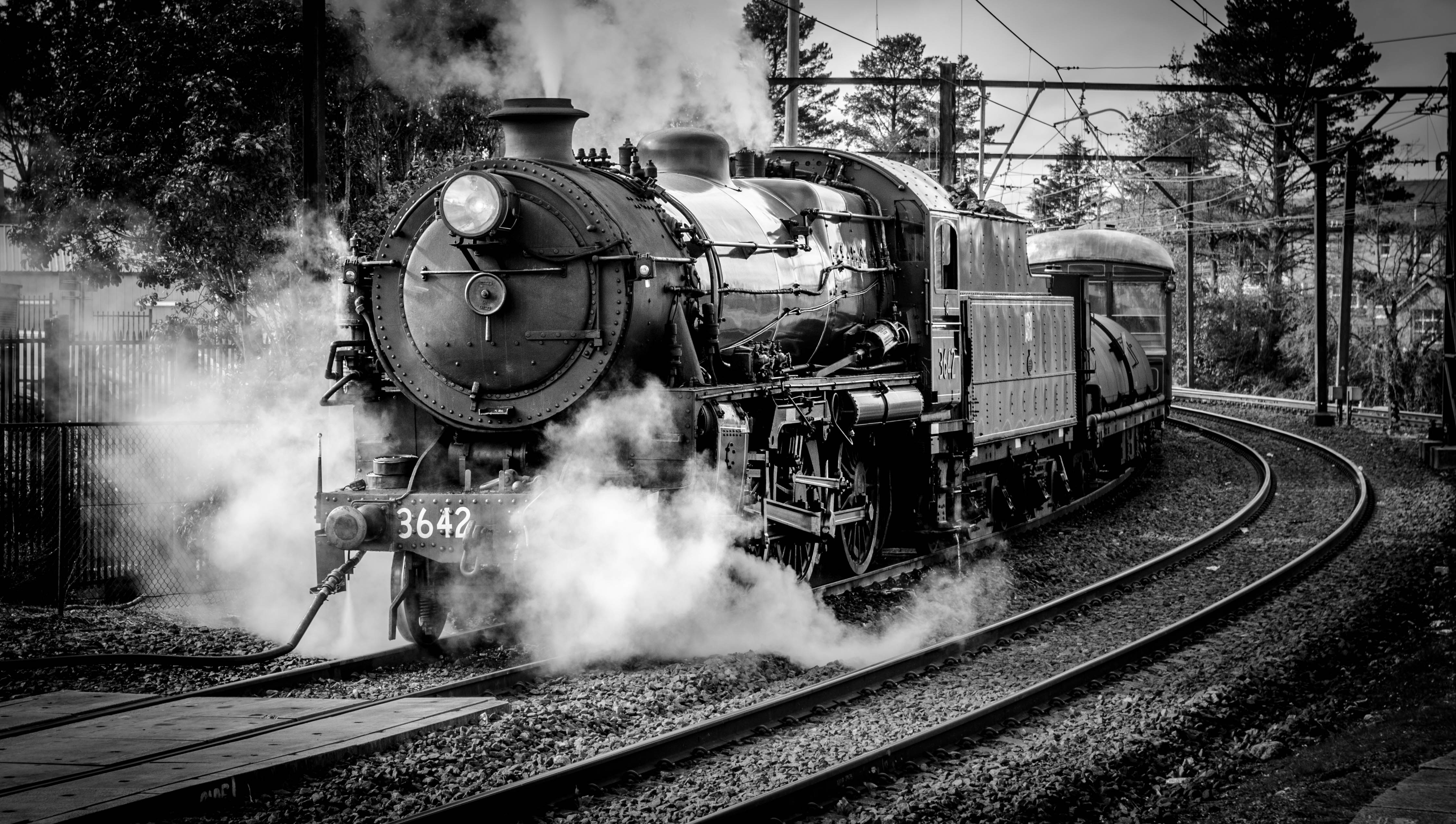
3642 at Katoomba station

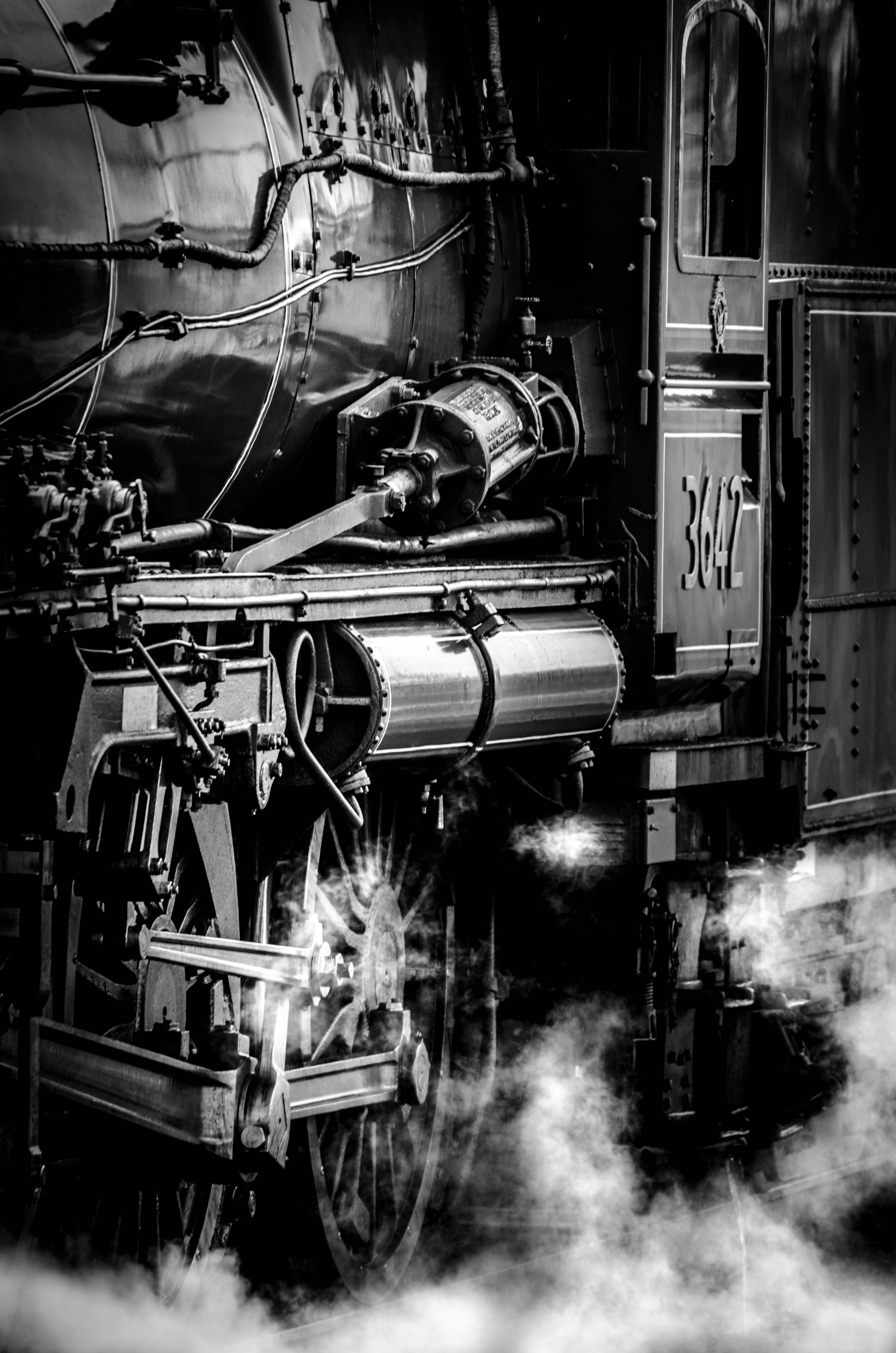
3642 at Katoomba station

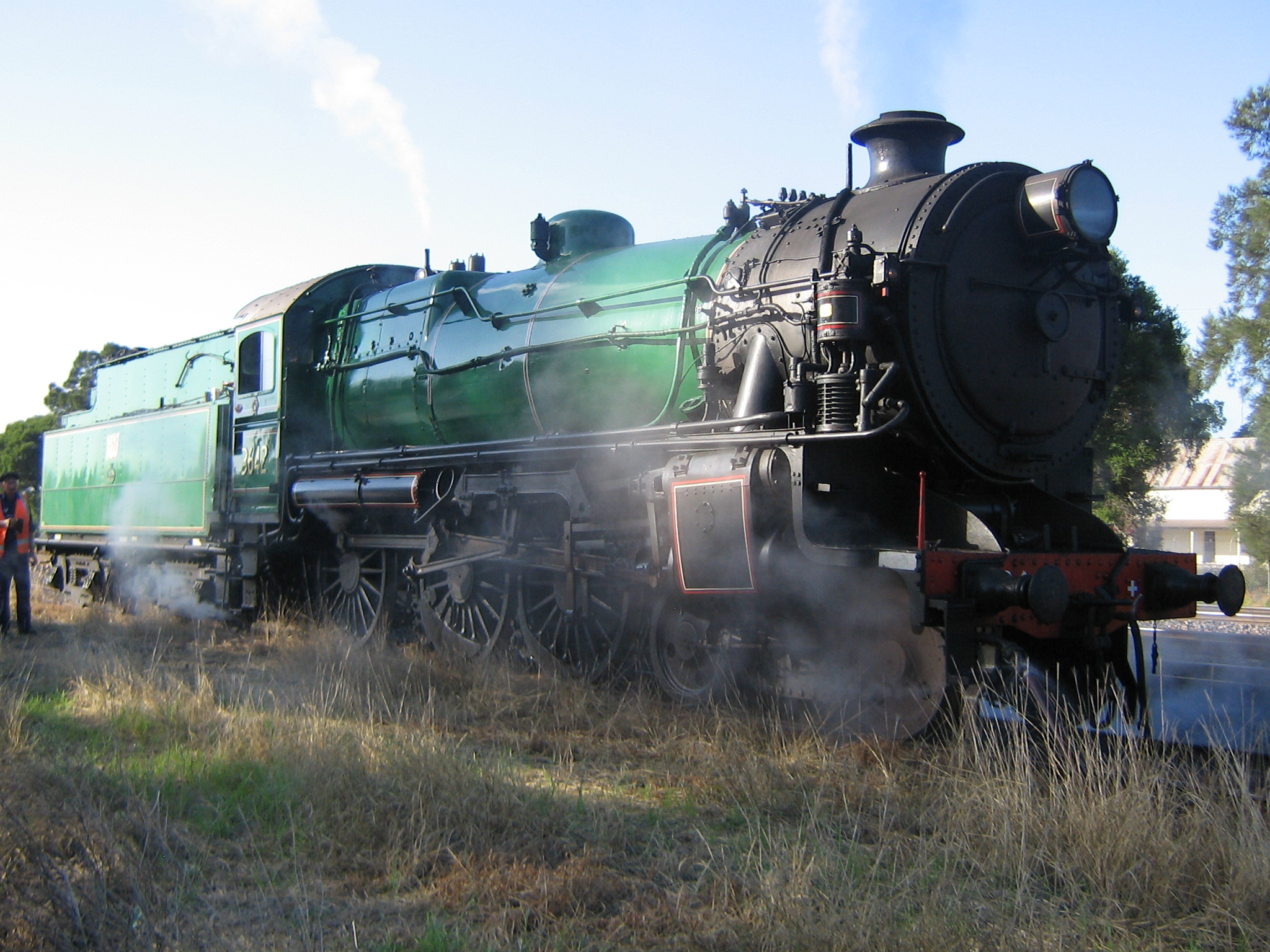
3642 at the Hunter Valley Steamfest in April 2009

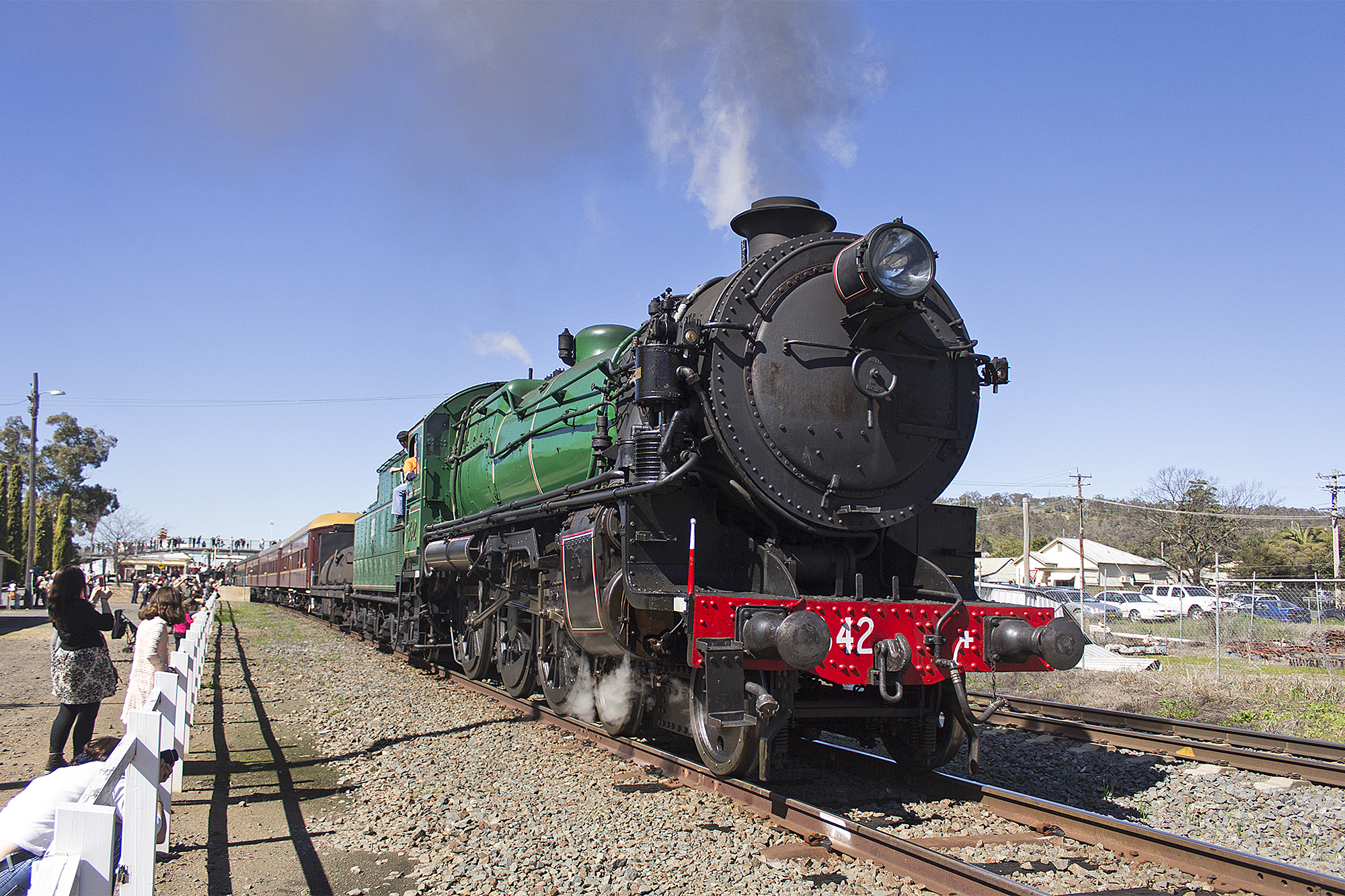
3642 at Wagga Wagga in 2013
