= The Picnic Train =

Australian heritage rail organisation

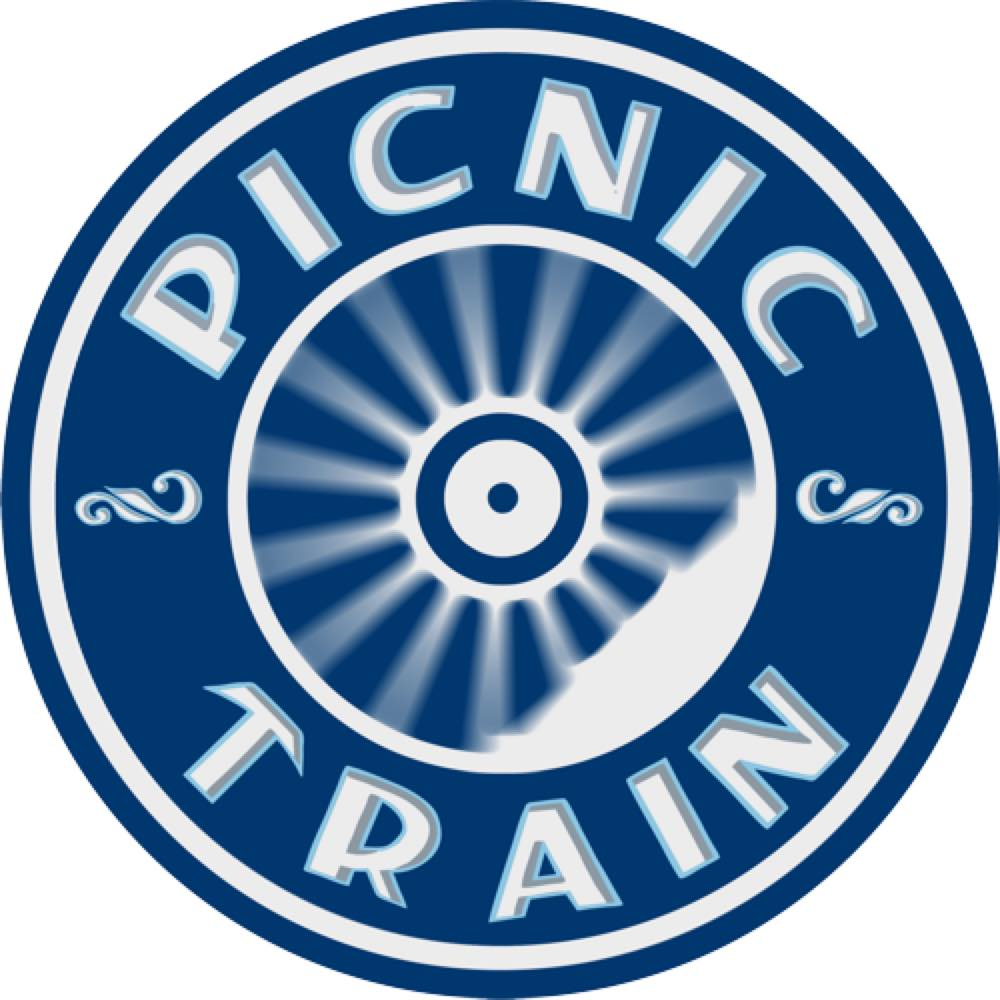
- Founded: 2019; 7 years ago
- Type: Not-for-profit organisation
- Purpose: Rail Heritage Tours
- Location: Sydney, New South Wales, Australia
- Website: picnictrain.com.au

The Picnic Train is a non-profit organisation dedicated to operating heritage steam train tours across New South Wales, Australia. Based in Sydney, it operates heritage steam locomotives 5917, R766, and 3112.

== History ==
In 2018 the 5917 Syndicate (owners of steam locomotive 5917, who has previous operated the locomotive with the Lachlan Valley Railway Society) decided to form a new rail tour organisation, The Picnic Train, with the 59 class as its centrepiece, to capture a slice of the growing rail tourism market and encourage future generations of railway heritage enthusiasts.

The Picnic Train officially came into being in 2019 and since that time has operated regular steam train tours across New South Wales, including its popular day tours from Sydney - Kiama Picnic Train, Moss Vale Picnic Train, Blue Mountains Picnic Train, and Hunter Valley Picnic Train, plus local tours in regional centres, including the Illawarra, Hunter Valley, Southern Highlands, Riverina, and Canberra in the Australian Capital Territory.

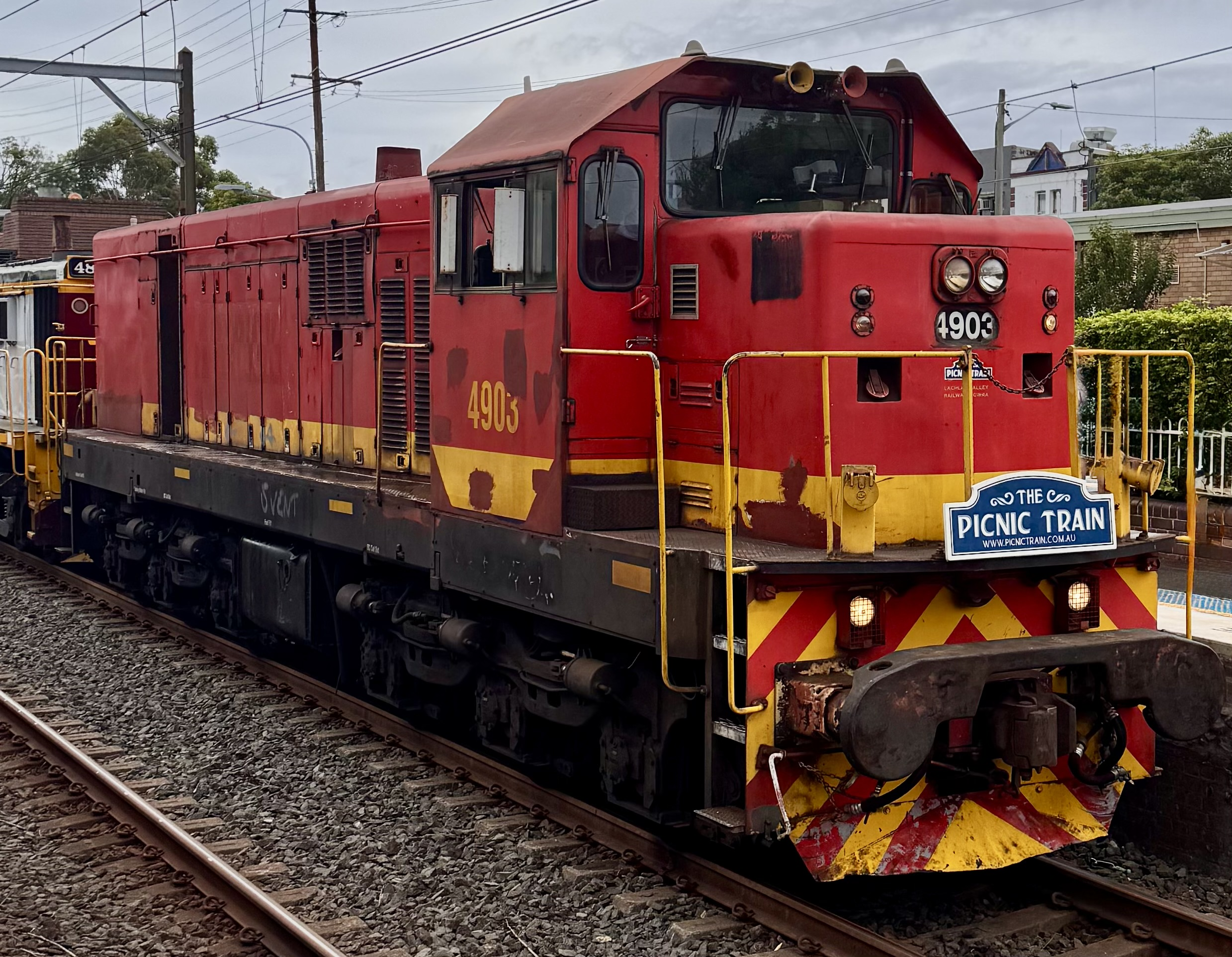
4903 operating a Picnic Train tour to Kiama in March 2026

Since its establishment, The Picnic Train has added other locomotives and carriages to its fleet. One major part of this new operation was the introduction of the former Victorian Railways locomotive R766 after a two decade restoration, and the ongoing restoration of former New South Wales Government Railways locomotive 3112. In addition diesel locomotive 4903 was purchased from the Lachlan Valley Railway in 2020.

== Fleet ==
5917

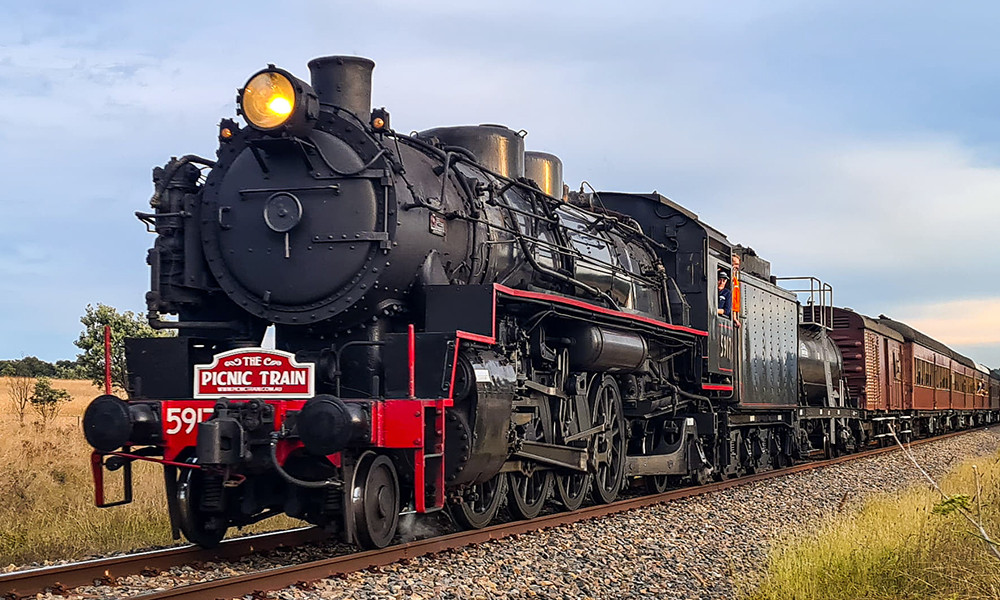
5917 Hauling The Picnic Train

Locomotive 5917 was built in the United States by the Baldwin Locomotive Works for the New South Wales Government Railways (NSWGR) as part of the D59 class, entering service on 12 March 1953 as an oil-burning locomotive, this was in the NSWGR's original plan when it was submitted to the builder during a coal shortage in New South Wales. It was later converted to a coal burner. 5917 was used for freight haulage during its NSWGR service right up to its withdrawal and spent some of its last years at Bathurst banking diesel hauled trains up Raglan and Tumulla banks. 5917 still carries the specially modified buffers to this day.

On 16 August 1972, the locomotive was withdrawn from service and stored at Enfield Locomotive Depot. 5917 was stored in the open on the east side of Enfield No 3 turntable until mid-1974 when it was moved into Enfield No 1 Shed for preliminary work following purchase by a syndicate of enthusiasts.

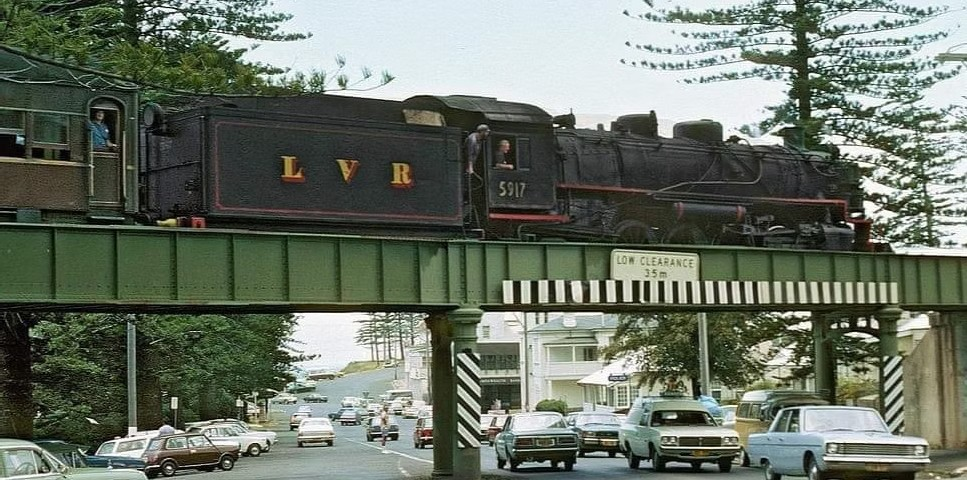
5917 trundles across the Terralong Street bridged as it arrives at Kiama with one of the Lachlan Valley Railway's Picnic Trains in 1973 (Dennis Rittson)

Ownership passed to the '5917 Syndicate' and 5917 was operated by the Lachlan Valley Railway. It was moved out of storage at Enfield on 22 October 1974 when it hauled 3046 and 3090T to the Rhondda Colliery site of the Hunter Valley Steam Railway & Museum. During 1976 5917 steamed to Peterborough, South Australia for an important anniversary there.

5917 was withdrawn in the late 1980's and restored at Cowra returning to service in September 2007. In 2017, the locomotive was withdrawn from service due to condition of the driving wheel tyres. It returned to service in 2019 as the primary locomotive for The Picnic Train.

R766

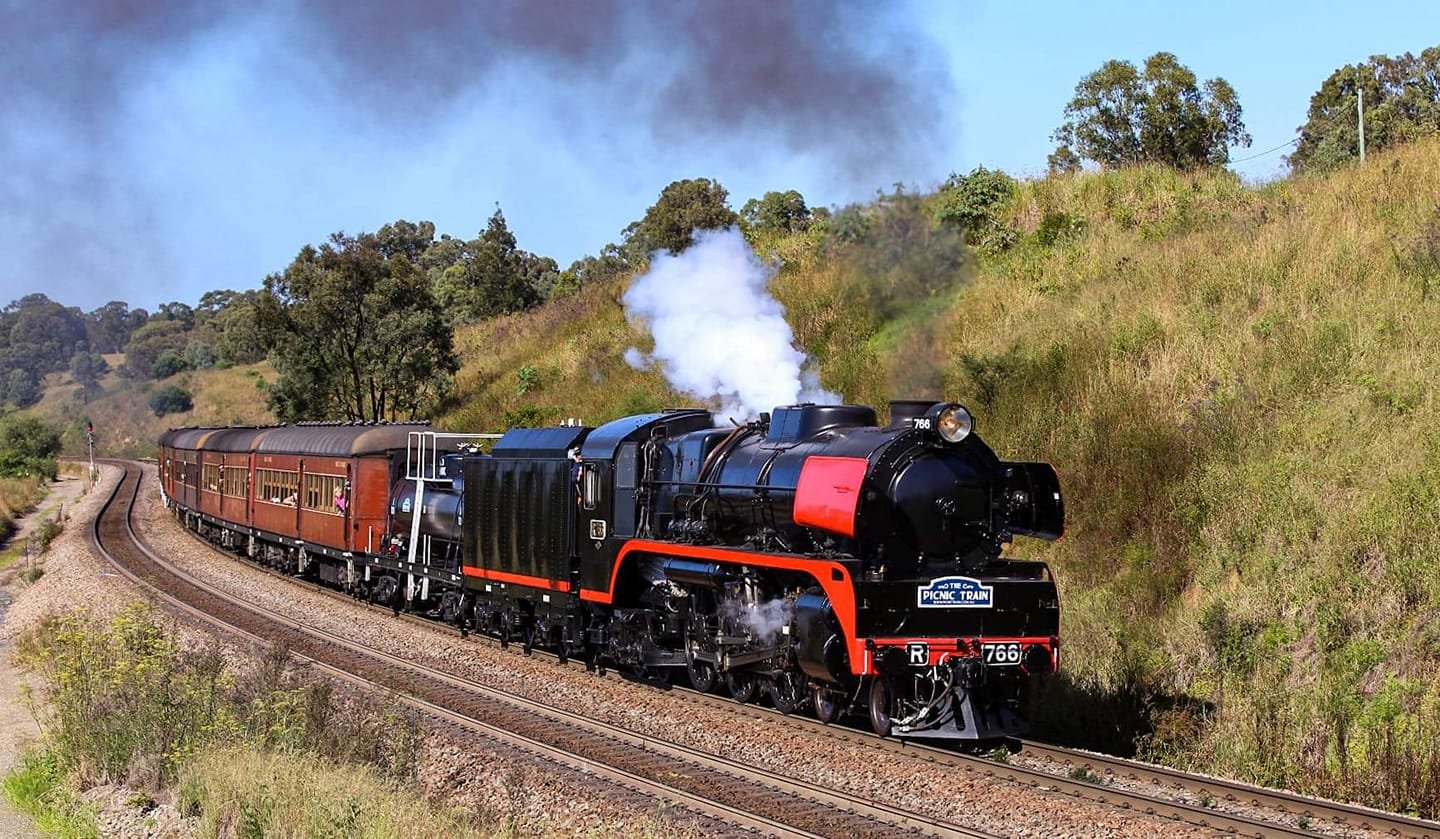
R766 Hauling The Picnic Train

The Victorian Railways R class (VR) reflected an ongoing evolution of VR locomotive design and a response to the changing operational environment of the VR in the postwar era. The VR broke with a long-standing policy of in-house steam locomotive construction and called for tenders to construct an additional 50 R class. The contract was awarded to North British Locomotive Company of Glasgow, Scotland on 21 September 1949. On 12 January 1950, the order was increased to 70.

The R class proved to be a fine locomotive in its intended role of express passenger service, and individual R class locomotives were soon running upwards of 950 to 1,250 miles (1,530 to 2,010 km) each per week.[10] Dynamometer car testing showed they were capable of producing a maximum 1,840 drawbar horsepower (1,372 kW) at 37.5 mph (60.4 km/h). The R's impressive debut was cut short by the introduction of the B class diesel electric locomotives from July 1952. By the end of 1953, the success of the B class saw the R class withdrawn from The Overland service to Adelaide. In the 1960s, as the railway preservation movement began to gather momentum, a small number of R class locomotives found a new role as power for excursion train services. In this role they were able to fulfill their intended role of high speed passenger travel, with speeds of over 80 mph (129 km/h) being recorded.

R766 has passed through a number of operators and owners in preservation. It was acquired by a company trading as "Australian Vintage Travel" in 1981 and restored to operating condition for hauling luxury rail services. After Australian Vintage Travel folded in 1986, R766 was acquired by a syndicate of shareholders ("766 Syndicate") and leased to Steamrail Victoria. In 1994, Steamrail volunteers re-painted R 766 in a maroon livery based on that of the London Midland and Scottish Railway, before the locomotive was leased to West Coast Railway (and repainted in the WCR corporate livery) in 2000.

Like several other classes, the R-class was designed for ease of conversion to 4 ft 8+1/2 in (1,435 mm) standard gauge. Following its withdrawal from West Coast Railway service, R766 was converted from 5 ft 3 in (1,600 mm) to 4 ft 8+1/2 in (1,435 mm) standard gauge by the Hunter Valley Railway Trust and was transferred to North Rothbury, New South Wales in December 2007. It was relaunched as part of The Picnic Train fleet in March 2022.

In 2026, R766 became the first Victorian steam locomotive to operate over the Sydney suburban rail network and into Sydney Central station. Following its certification for operation on the Sydney Trains network, R766 was marked with an official launch ceremony at Sydney Central on 28 August 2026, before making its first public departure from Sydney Central on 29 August 2026 and running subsequent tours across the metropolitan network including it's first trip to Kiama.

3112

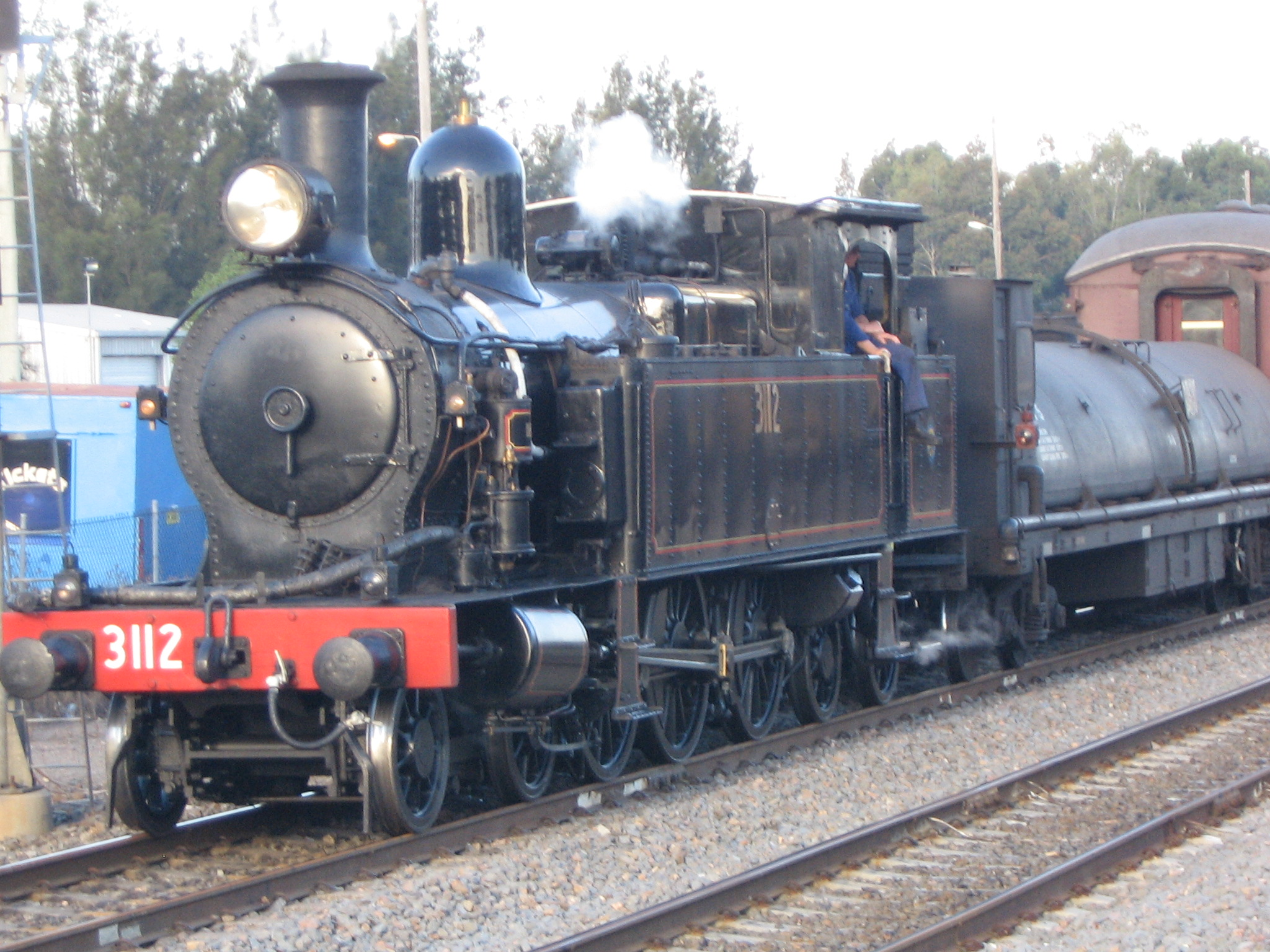
3112 at Maitland Steamfest

Built in 1914 by Beyer, Peacock & Company, Manchester, 3112 was one of 145 locomotives of the S636 class of 4-6-4T locomotives built specifically to handle the increasing volume of suburban traffic in Sydney, particularly on the steeply graded Northern, North Shore and Illawarra lines. The S636 class was later reclassified as the C30 class in 1924 and given new running numbers in the 30xx series.

Entering service in 1914 as S1240, 3112 was used initially on suburban duties around Sydney. It received its present number of 3112 in 1924 as part of the reclassification of the S636 locomotives into the C30 class. Following the displacement of the C30 class from Sydney suburban service by the new electric trains, 3112 was employed on local suburban services from Sydney, Newcastle and Wollongong.

From 1956 onwards 3112 and others were also employed in carriage-shunting duties at Sydney Central along with other members of its class. Previously, two Z26 class locomotives had been employed on this duty, but electrification of the carriage sidings at Sydney Central in 1956 meant that it was too risky to use them since the water inlet on the engines' water tanks was on top of the saddle tank. As side tank locomotives, the C30 class had no such safety restrictions, and so they also took up these additional duties.

With the arrival of new diesel locomotives in the 1960s, 3112 and the other members of the C30 were deemed to be surplus to requirements. 3112 was withdrawn sometime in the February 1972, and sold to the Lachlan Vintage Village and stored at the Parkes locomotive depot in 1974. It was then relocated to the Lachlan Vintage Village, Forbes along with locomotives, 1919, 5367 and 6042. It was subsequently purchased at auction in November 1986 by Barry Tulloch.

Following the purchase, it was moved by road and rail to the Lachlan Valley Railway's Cowra Locomotive Depot on 21 December 1986. Barry Tulloch, with the help of Ian MacDonald and 37 likeminded enthusiasts, restored 3112 to a running condition. It left Cowra on 26 January 1988, and came to Sydney via Harden to its new home at Eveleigh Railway Workshops. Restoration continued on many ancillary items throughout 1988, as well as extra refinements to equip it to run excursion trains.

With 3112's return to steam, it travelled over many parts of NSW. It attended the Aus Steam '88 event in Melbourne, travelling south in the company of 1210. On another occasion, 3112 was one of three locomotives selected to run a triple-headed excursion from Maitland to Sydney with the return run from the Hunter Valley Steamfest. The loco ran with 3801 and 4472 Flying Scotsman during 1989. On the Queen's Birthday weekend of 1989, 3112 assisted 3801 and 4472 from Valley Heights to Katoomba on the 1-in-33 grades.

Between 1988 and 2007, 3112 saw most of its work with 3801 Limited, attending the annual Hunter Valley Steamfest at Maitland and Thirlmere's Festival of Steam, as well as running enthusiast specials to Kiama, Gosford, Moss Vale and other locations in the Sydney area, during which it was sometimes paired with 3801 and 3830. It has also worked with 1210, 3001T, 3016T, 3137, 3526 and 5910. During this time the locomotive was based at the Eveleigh Railway Workshops, home to 3801 Limited, where Barry, Ian and a small band of volunteers attended to running maintenance and statutory examinations.

In May 2007, 3112 was sold by Barry Tulloch to Boyd Munro, who decided to move the locomotive to Canberra to be kept with the rest of his collection in July 2007. The locomotive was then placed in open storage in the sidings behind the Canberra Railway Museum. In February 2015 it moved to the Goulburn Railway Workshops for overhaul. 3112 will return to service in 2026 as part of The Picnic Train locomotive fleet.

4537

Built in Sydney by A. E. Goodwin in the early 1960s, 45 class diesel locomotive 4537 spent decades in New South Wales freight service before being retired in the mid-1990s. It was subsequently sold to Junee Railway Workshop, reactivated, and leased to the Port Kembla Steelworks, acquiring the nickname "Stumpy" from its shortened nose. After working with several operators across Australia, it entered heritage preservation with The Picnic Train alongside 49 class locomotive 4903 ("Tarpy") in August 2026.

4903

Built in Sydney by Clyde Engineering at Granville (builder's number 60-223), 49 class diesel-electric locomotive 4903 entered service with the New South Wales Government Railways in November 1960. Based at Parkes for nearly three decades, it operated primarily on lightly ballasted western and cross-country lines before being transferred to Sydney's Delec depot in 1989 and briefly working ballast trains in Victoria during the 1994–1995 Melbourne–Adelaide standard-gauge conversion project. Following its withdrawal from government service, 4903 worked for private freight operators including Interail and Patrick Portlink before entering heritage preservation with the Lachlan Valley Railway. In 2020, it was purchased by The Picnic Train, where it is nicknamed "Tarpy" and used for shunting, carriage movements, and train assistance.
