= 3237 =

Preserved New South Wales C32 class locomotive

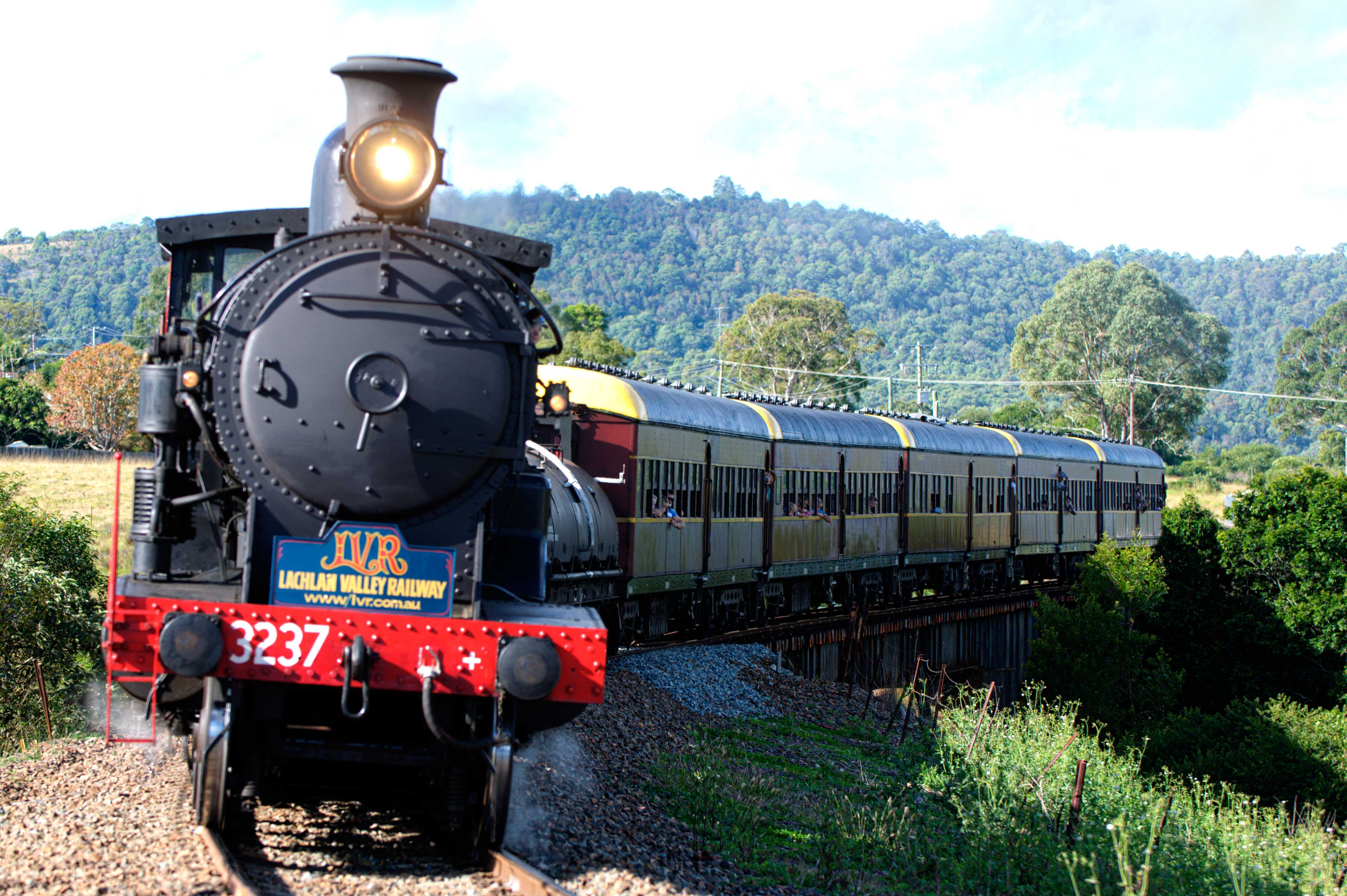
- 3237 at Taree in May 2013
Type and origin
- Power type: Steam
- Builder: Beyer, Peacock & Company
- Serial number: 3436
- Build date: 1892
Specifications
- Configuration
  - Whyte: 4-6-0
- Gauge: 1,435 mm (4 ft 8 1/2 in) standard gauge
- Length: 18.4 m (60 ft 4 3/8 in)
- Total weight: 105.5 t (103.8 long tons; 116.3 short tons) fully loaded
- Fuel type: Coal
- Fuel capacity: 9.652 t (9.500 long tons; 10.640 short tons)
- Water cap.: 16,425 L (3,613 imp gal; 4,339 US gal)
- Boiler pressure: 160 psi (1,100 kPa)
- Cylinders: 2 outside
Career
- Operators: New South Wales Government Railways
- Class: C32
- Numbers: P508/3237
- Official name: Lachlan
- First run: 26 February 1893
- Disposition: Operational

3237 is a preserved former New South Wales Government Railways C32 class steam locomotive. Built in 1893 by Beyer, Peacock & Company, England, it is preserved by the Lachlan Valley Railway.

== In service ==
3237 was built by Beyer, Peacock & Company, Manchester in 1892 and entered service on 26 February 1893. Originally numbered P508, it became 3237 in the 1924 renumbering scheme. It worked mainline runs around New South Wales, while its original use was as a passenger express locomotive, it was also used for light freight. For the last part of its working career 3237 was based at Dubbo locomotive depot, 3237's last duties were to work reclamation trains and as a yard shunter in Dubbo. It was withdrawn on 3 November 1971, when it was sent light engine from Dubbo to Enfield Locomotive Depot for storage. In its 78 years of revenue service, from 26 February 1892 to 1 November 1971, 3237 ran a total of 2,225,224 miles.

== Preservation ==
3237 was stored at Enfield Locomotive Depot for three years before being moved twice. The first move was to Parkes, on 22 October 1974, in a three loco light engine movement, comprising 6042 (in steam) + 3237 (dead) + 3026T (in steam), as exhibits for the Lachlan Vintage Village at Forbes. It was later sold to the Lachlan Valley Railway (LVR) and moved to Cowra.

3237 was dismantled during the 1980s for a lengthy overhaul which included a new front tube-plate. The overhaul was completed with 3237's returned to service in 2006. During a north coast tour in 2012 the locomotive sustained a mechanical issue and had to be taken out of service. It was repaired in Taree. Ten months later 3237 re-entered service for the LVR on the weekend of 11 & 12 May 2013 on shuttles for Taree Rail Centenary.

Minor running repairs commenced January 2014 with 3237 returning to service in mid 2014. Through the end of 2014, 3237 partnered up with 5917 with successful running weekends at Richmond, Valley Heights and a trip to Cootamundra.

After a tour in 2016 it received some repairs at Cootamundra where it was then transferred to Goulburn Roundhouse for a major overhaul by LVR volunteers funded partly by a Transport Heritage NSW grant program. This overhaul also included a Waugh grate conversion.

In September 2019 the locomotive returned to service on the annual LVR Richmond Steam Shuttles
