= 5917 =

Historic Australian steam locomotive

NSWGR D5917
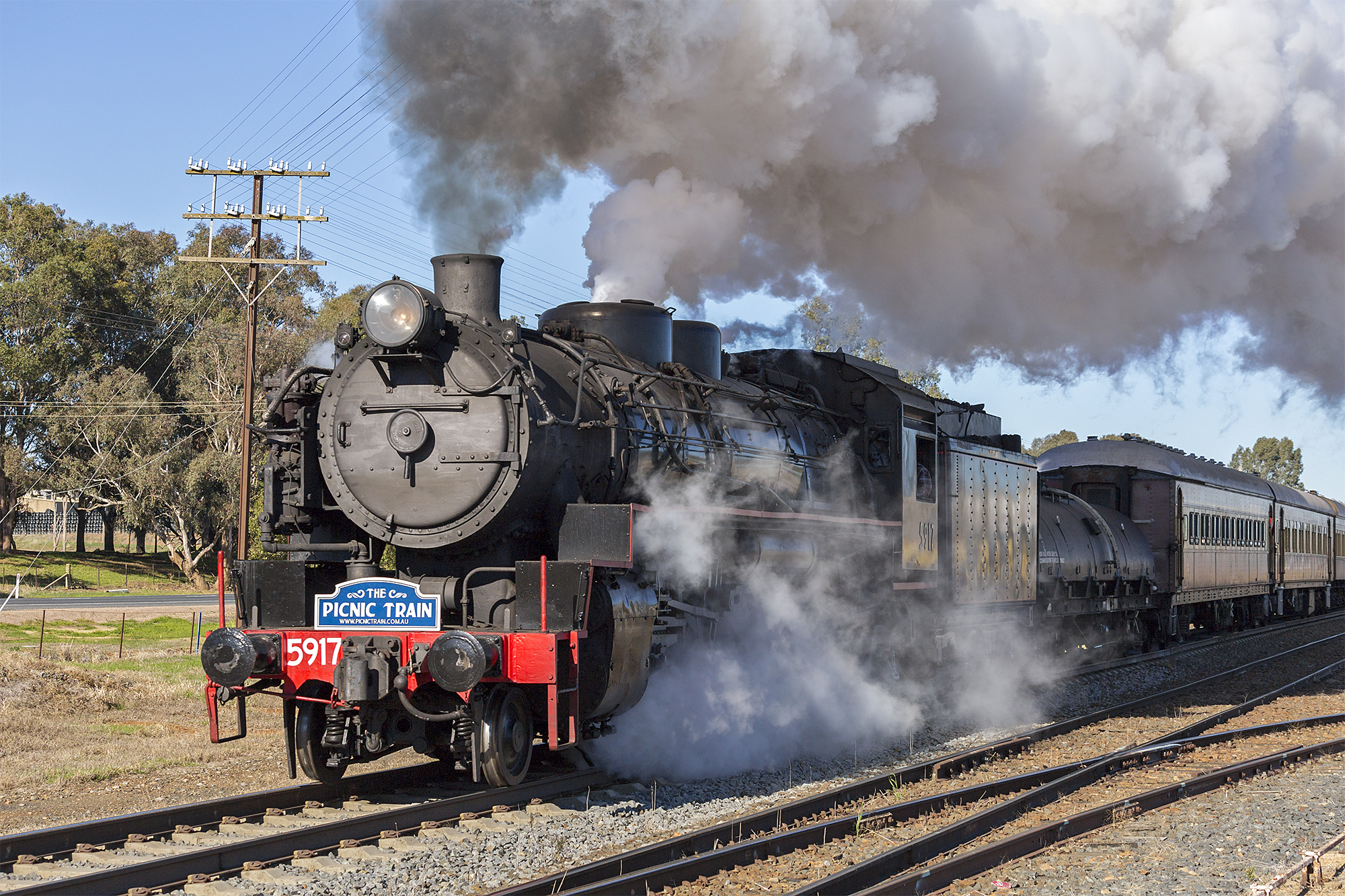
- 5917 passing Bomen railway station in June 2019
Type and origin
- Power type: Steam
- Builder: Baldwin Locomotive Works
- Serial number: 75580
Specifications
- Configuration
  - Whyte: 2-8-2
  - UIC: 1D1
- Gauge: 1,435 mm (4 ft 8 1/2 in) standard gauge
- Length: 18.4 m (60 ft 4 3/8 in)
- Fuel type: Coal
- Cylinders: Two
Career
- Operators: New South Wales Government Railways
- Class: D59
- Numbers: 5917
- Locale: New South Wales
- First run: 12 March 1953
- Last run: August 1972
- Disposition: Operational

Locomotive 5917 is a two-cylinder, simple, non-condensing, superheated, coal-fired, 2-8-2 ‘Mikado' steam locomotive and one of five D59 class locomotives that were preserved. Since 2019 it has operated main line steam train tours with The Picnic Train across New South Wales, including the Kiama Picnic Train between Sydney and Kiama.

== In service ==
Locomotive 5917 was built in the United States by the Baldwin Locomotive Works for the New South Wales Government Railways (NSWGR) entering service on 12 March 1953 as an oil-burning locomotive, this was in the NSWGR's original plan when it was submitted to the builder during a coal shortage in New South Wales. It was later converted to a coal burner. 5917 was used for freight haulage during its NSWGR service right up to its withdrawal and spent some of its last years at Bathurst banking diesel hauled trains up Raglan and Tumulla banks. 5917 still carries the specially modified buffers to this day

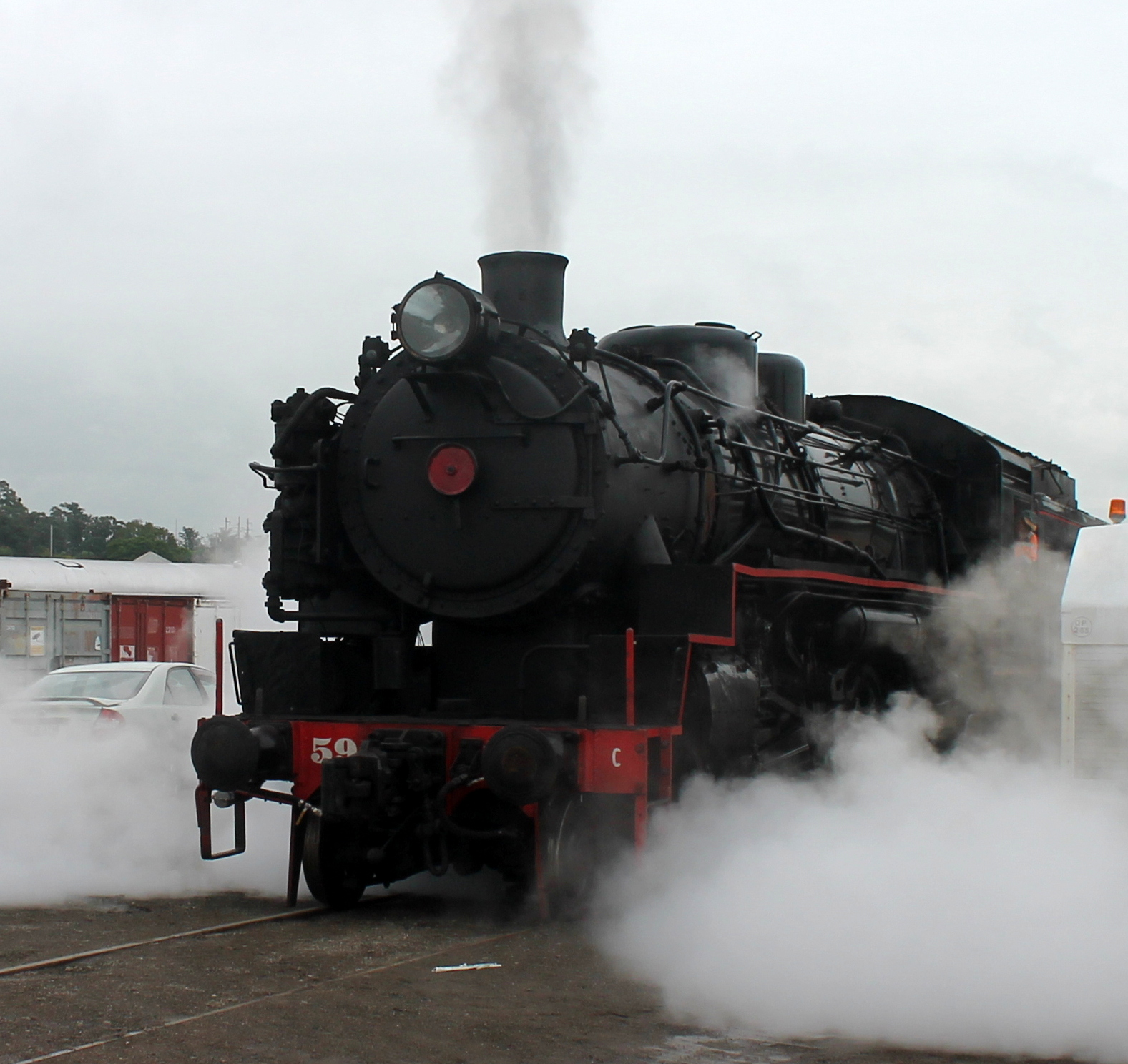
5917 in 2014.

== Demise and preservation ==
On 16 August 1972, the locomotive was withdrawn from service and stored at Enfield Locomotive Depot. 5917 was stored in the open on the east side of Enfield No 3 turntable until mid-1974 when it was moved into Enfield No 1 Shed for preliminary work following purchase by a syndicate of enthusiasts.

Ownership passed to the '5917 Society' being operated and maintained by the Lachlan Valley Railway. It was moved out of storage at Enfield on 22 October 1974 when it hauled 3046 and 3090T to the Rhondda Colliery site of the Hunter Valley Steam Railway & Museum. During 1976 5917 steamed to Peterborough, South Australia for an important anniversary there.

In January 1978, 5917 was used on Festival of Sydney trains to Kiama. It was withdrawn in the late 1980s and restored at Cowra returning to service in September 2007. It was leased to 3801 Limited for some steam tours during 2008/09, then was taken out of service during April 2009 for major boiler work and running repairs on the locomotive at which were done at Eveleigh Railway Workshops. A boiler inspection and steam test was held at Eveleigh in November 2013, 5917 passed the test and had a successful trial in the early hours of 4 April 2014 and expected to have returned to service on 5 April 2014 for a private charter.

In 2017, the locomotive was withdrawn from service due to condition of the driving wheel tyres. It returned to service in 2019 and now runs under Sydney Rail Services accreditation as the primary locomotive for The Picnic Train.

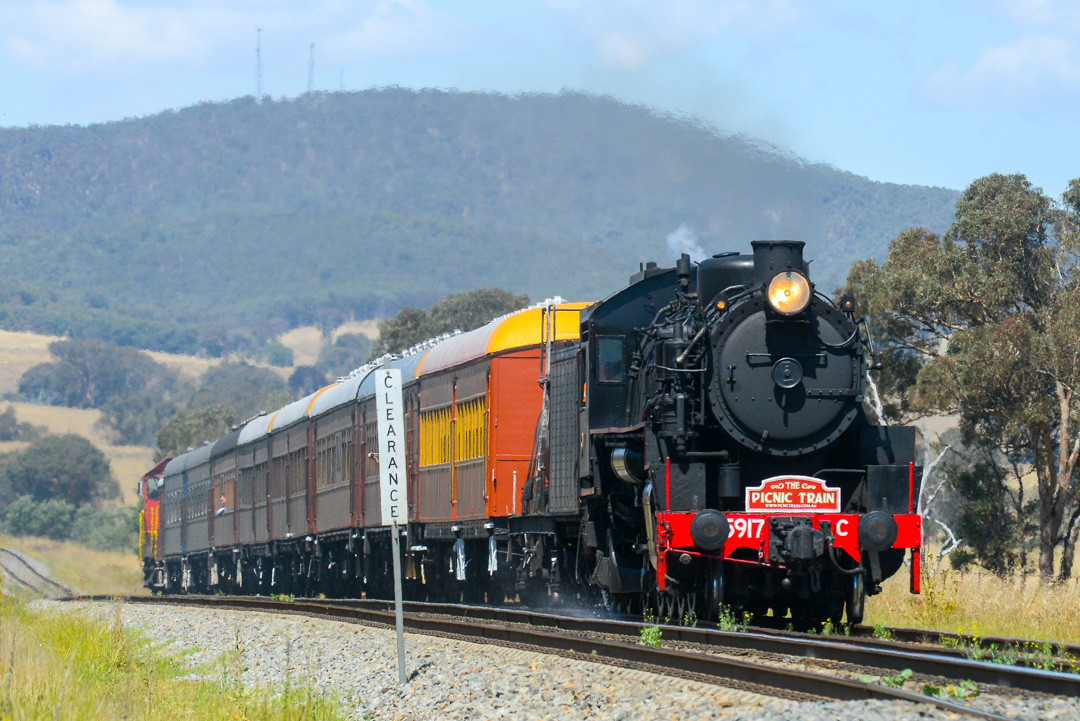
5917 approaching the site of the old Coolalie station on the Main South railway line in New South Wales, Australia.
