= New South Wales D59 class locomotive =

Australian two-cylinder 2-8-2 locomotives

New South Wales D59 class
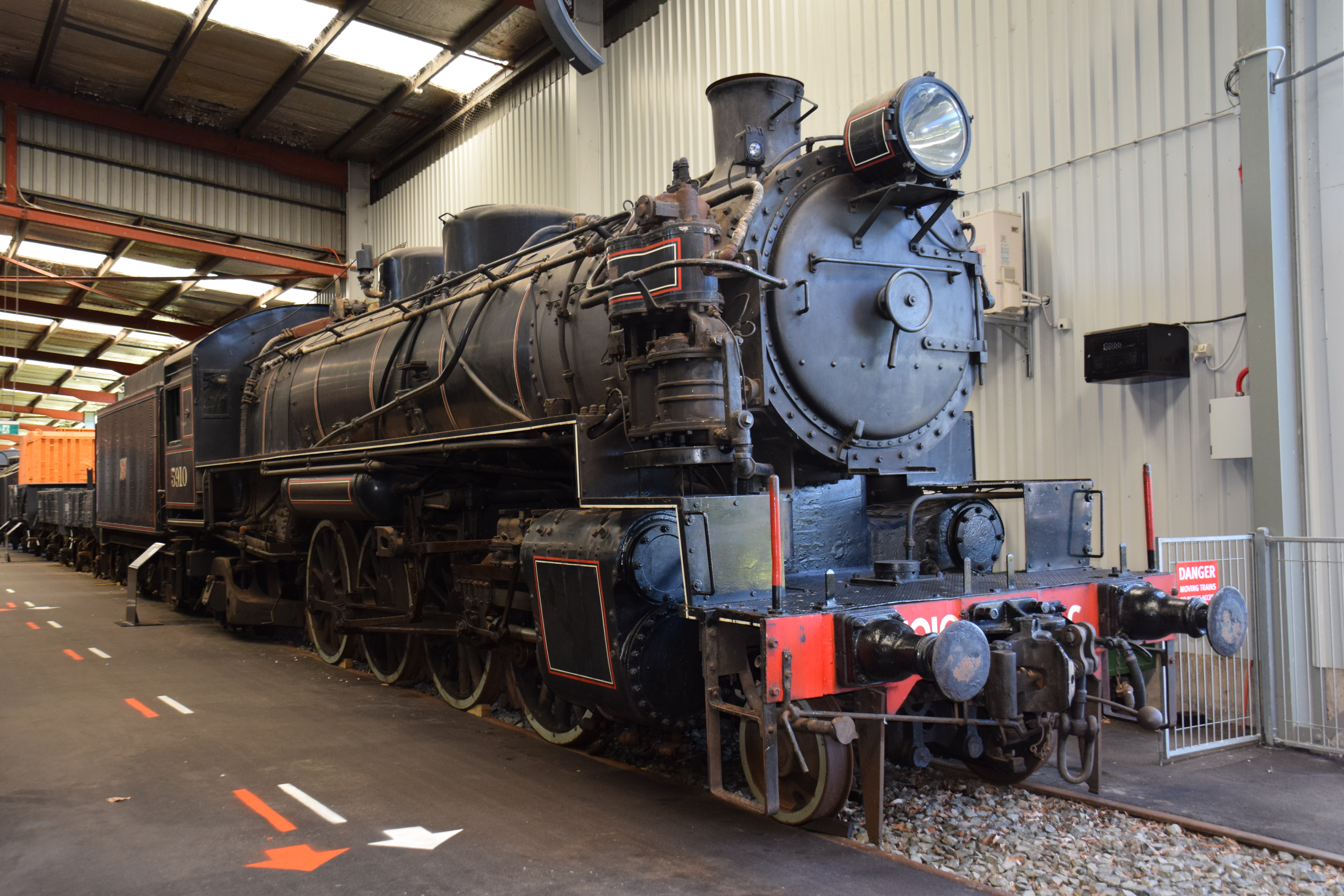
- 5910 at the New South Wales Railway Museum, Thirlmere
Type and origin
- Power type: Steam
- Builder: Baldwin-Lima-Hamilton; Philadelphia
- Serial number: 75564–75583
- Build date: August 1952-March 1953
- Total produced: 20
Specifications
- Configuration
  - Whyte: 2-8-2
  - UIC: 1'D1'h
- Gauge: 4 ft 8 1/2 in (1,435 mm) standard gauge
- Driver dia.: 5 ft 0 in (1,524 mm)
- Adhesive weight: 65 t (64.0 long tons; 71.7 short tons)
- Loco weight: 91 t (89.6 long tons; 100.3 short tons)
- Fuel type: Oil, later coal
- Fuel capacity: 10,800 litres (2,400 imp gal; 2,900 US gal) (oil); 11 t (10.8 long tons; 12.1 short tons) (coal)
- Water cap.: 24,750 litres (5,440 imp gal; 6,540 US gal)
- Firebox
  - Grate area: 47 sq ft (4.4 m^{2})
- Boiler pressure: 1,379 kPa (200.0 psi)
- Heating surface: 2,165 sq ft (201.1 m^{2})
- Superheater
  - Heating area: 625 sq ft (58.1 m^{2})
- Cylinders: Two, outside
- Cylinder size: 21 in × 28 in (533.4 mm × 711.2 mm)
- Valve gear: Walscharts
Performance figures
- Tractive effort: 34,986 lbf (155.6 kN)
- Factor of adh.: 4.09
Career
- Operators: New South Wales Government Railways
- Class: D59
- Numbers: 5901–5920
- Disposition: 5 preserved, 15 scrapped

The 59 class is a class of steam locomotive built by Baldwin-Lima-Hamilton Corporation for the New South Wales Government Railways of Australia.

== History ==
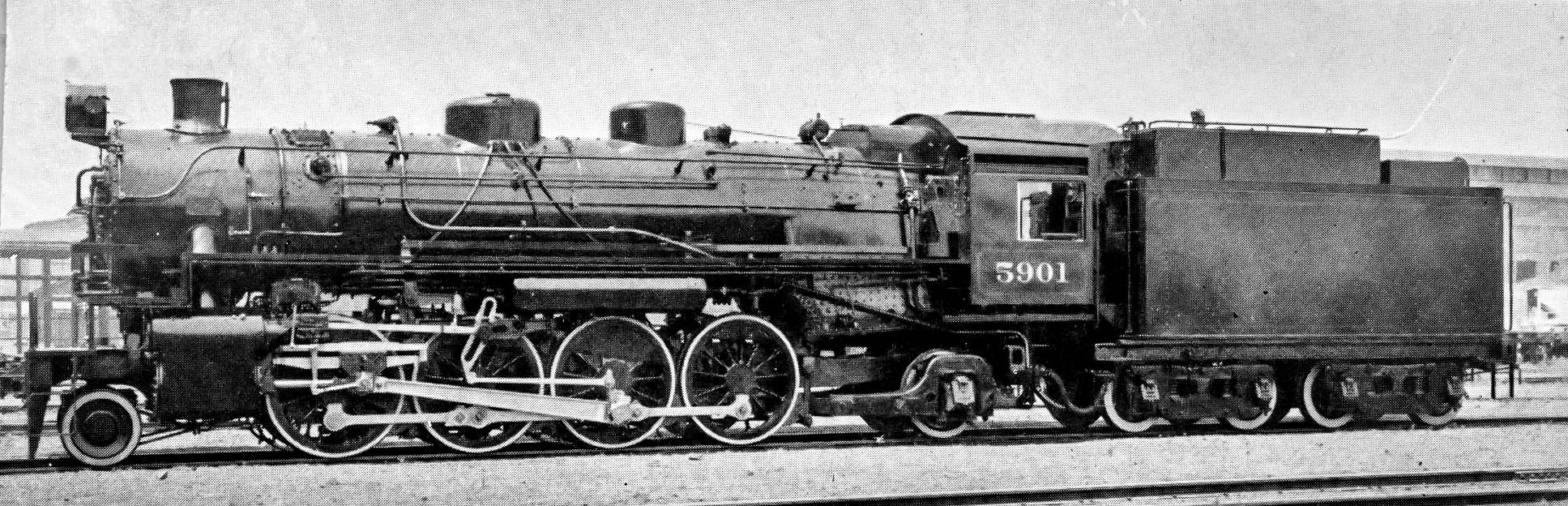
NSWGR D59 builder's photo

The class were ordered from Baldwin-Lima-Hamilton (the former Baldwin Locomotive Works) to relieve motive power shortages. The design is a variation on the USATC S200 Class Mikado engine, a design which first appeared in 1941.

Twenty locomotives entered service between August 1952 and March 1953. The most immediately apparent difference is the rather stubby short tender that was specially built to allow the 59 class to be turned on a standard 60-foot (18.29 m) turntable. It was the specification of these tenders which considerably delayed the delivery from the initial order. Unfortunately due to the weight of the locomotive it was eventually discovered, in service, that most 60-foot (18.29 m) turntables could not turn the 59 class engine due to balancing issues.

The class was the first 'new build' (as opposed to conversions) of oil-fired engines to be introduced by the New South Wales Government Railways and were the first locomotives to be built for NSW by Baldwin since 1905. They were initially used on the Short North from Enfield to Broadmeadow. They were soon placed in service on both the Main Western and Main South lines and, although their light axle load made them available to a large proportion of the state, their sphere of operation was limited by the location of oil fueling facilities. Accordingly, they saw most of their service, as oil burners, working on the Main North and North Coast lines, as well as in the Sydney metropolitan area.

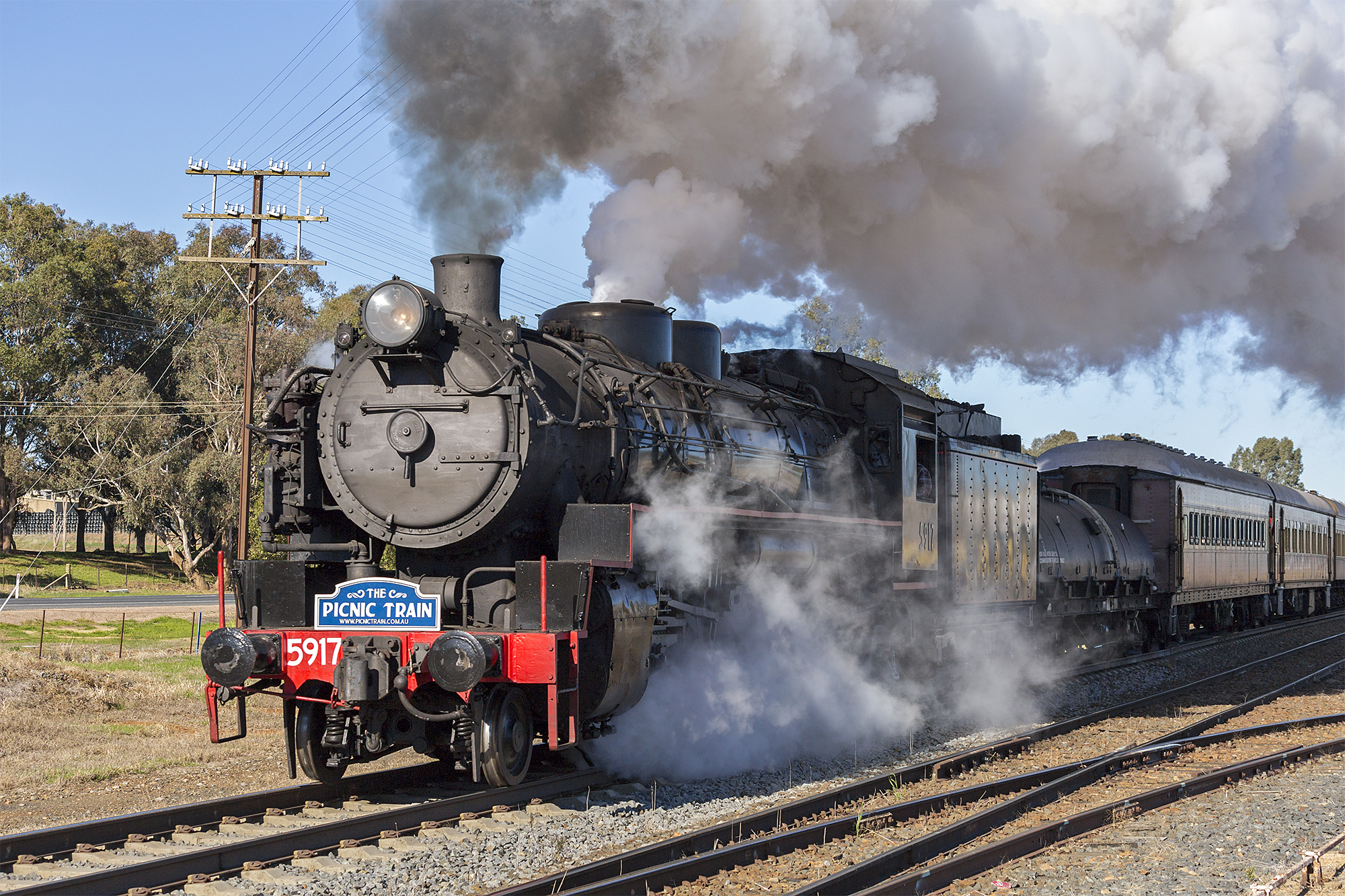
5917 on the Main Southern line at Bomen

In 1961, it was decided to convert the majority of the class to coal burning. Seventeen were converted using an ashpan based on the 38 class engine arrangement, together with modifications to the smokebox, fitting of brick arches, grates, firehole doors, etc. Three 59 class (5908, 5916, 5918) remained as oil burners and ended their service as shunters at Grafton. 5918 was badly damaged in a shunting accident and was used as a parts donor for 5908 and 5916 until the remains were scrapped in 1969. 5908 and 5916 were later transferred to Broadmeadow Locomotive Depot in December 1970 for use as stationary boilers. In August 1974, 5916 was sent to the Eveleigh Carriage Workshops for the same use. In 1977, both were transferred to the former NSW Rail Transport Museum at Thirlmere

The coal burning locomotives were mainly operated from Enfield Locomotive Depot, working to Goulburn. They were also based at Broadmeadow Locomotive Depot, working from Gosford to Armidale. From February 1967, 59 class locomotives were allocated to Bathurst for banking duties on Raglan and Tumulla banks. During 1968/69, 59 class were often used on freight trains to Taree during a motive power shortage.

== Preservation ==
Withdrawals began in June 1969 with the last withdrawn in December 1972. Five engines of the class are preserved.

Preserved 59 class locomotives
No.	Description	Organisation	Location	Status	Ref
5908	Oil Burning	Transport Heritage NSW	Goulburn Roundhouse	Under static restoration	NSW Locomotive, Steam 5908
5910	Coal Burning	Transport Heritage NSW	Thirlmere	Static display	NSW Locomotive, Steam 5910
5916	Oil Burning	Transport Heritage NSW	Chullora Railway Workshops	Stored	
5917	Coal Burning	The Picnic Train	Goulburn Railway Workshops	Operational	
5920	Coal Burning	Dorrigo Steam Railway & Museum	Dorrigo	Stored	Last steam loco imported from USA
