= Preserved steam locomotives of New South Wales =

This list of preserved steam locomotives in New South Wales makes no claim to being complete.

While there are many surviving examples of several locomotive classes, some are in a very poor condition, including partly dismantled or badly corroded locomotives, the technical condition of which cannot really be accurately conveyed in their descriptions.

New South Wales X10 class locomotives in preservation are fully listed <here>

== New South Wales Government Railways ==
Steam Locomotives
No.	Description	Manufacturer	Year	Current Organisation	Location	Status	Ref
1021	0-4-0T saddle tank	Manning Wardle	1896	Transport Heritage NSW	Thirlmere	static exhibit	NSW Locomotive, Steam 1021
1022	0-4-0T saddle tank	Vulcan Iron Works	1916	Transport Heritage NSW	Valley Heights	dismantled
1033	2-4-0T passenger tank	Beyer, Peacock & Company	1885	Transport Heritage NSW	Thirlmere	static exhibit	NSW Locomotive, Steam 1033
1042	2-4-0T shunter	Henry Vale & Co.	1887	Maitland Steam Park	Maitland	under restoration
1210	4-4-0 passenger	Beyer, Peacock & Company	1878	Canberra Railway Museum	Canberra	not operational
1219	4-4-0 passenger	Dübs & Company	1879	Transport Heritage NSW	Broadmeadow	stored	NSW Locomotive, Steam 1219
1243	4-4-0 passenger	Beyer, Peacock & Company	1882	Powerhouse Museum	Pyrmont	static display	PHM Locomotive 1243
1301	4-4-2T passenger	Beyer, Peacock & Company	1877	Transport Heritage NSW	Thirlmere	static exhibit	NSW Locomotive, Steam 1301
1307	4-4-2T passenger	Beyer, Peacock & Company	1877	Yass Railway Station Museum	Yass	static exhibit	NSW Locomotive, Steam 1307
1308	4-4-2T passenger	Beyer, Peacock & Company	1877	Transport Heritage NSW	Valley Heights	dismantled	NSW Locomotive, Steam 1307
1709	4-4-0 passenger	Vulcan Foundry	1887	Transport Heritage NSW	Thirlmere	operational	NSW Locomotive, Steam 1709
1803	0-6-0T passenger	Vulcan Foundry	1884	Transport Heritage NSW	Thirlmere	Thomas Tank Engine	NSW Locomotive, Steam 1803
1904	0-6-0 goods	Beyer, Peacock & Company	1877	Dorrigo Steam Railway & Museum	Dorrigo	stored
1905	0-6-0 goods	Beyer, Peacock & Company	1877	Transport Heritage NSW	Thirlmere	static exhibit	NSW Locomotive, Steam 1905
1919	0-6-0 goods	Beyer, Peacock & Company	1878	Glenreagh Mountain Railway	Glenreagh	operational	Steam Locomotive 1919
1923	0-6-0 goods	Beyer, Peacock & Company	1879	Dorrigo Steam Railway & Museum	Dorrigo	stored
2029	2-6-4T passenger	Eveleigh Railway Workshops	1911	Transport Heritage NSW	Thirlmere	static exhibit	NSW Locomotive, Steam 2029
2408	2-6-0 goods	Dübs & Company	1891	Dorrigo Steam Railway & Museum	Dorrigo	stored
2413	2-6-0 goods	Dübs & Company	1891	Canberra Railway Museum	Junee	stored
2414	2-6-0 goods	Dübs & Company	1891	Dorrigo Steam Railway & Museum	Dorrigo	stored
2419	2-6-0 goods	Dübs & Company	1891	Transport Heritage NSW	Goulburn	static exhibit	NSW Locomotive, Steam 2419
2510	2-6-0 goods	Beyer, Peacock & Company	1882	Transport Heritage NSW	Thirlmere	static exhibit	NSW Locomotive, Steam 2510
2535	2-6-0 goods	Beyer, Peacock & Company	1883	Dorrigo Steam Railway & Museum	Dorrigo	stored
2605	2-6-2ST mixed traffic	Dübs & Company	1891	Lithgow State Mine Heritage Park & Railway	Lithgow	static display
2606	2-6-2ST mixed traffic	Dübs & Company	1891	Transport Heritage NSW	Broadmeadow	stored	NSW Locomotive, Steam 2606
2705	2-6-0 mixed traffic	Hunslet Engine Company	1913	Transport Heritage NSW	Thirlmere	operational	NSW Locomotive, Steam 2705
3001	4-6-0 mixed traffic	Beyer, Peacock & Company	1903	Transport Heritage NSW	Thirlmere	Under operational restoration	NSW Locomotive, Steam 3001
3013	4-6-4T passenger	Beyer, Peacock & Company	1903	ACT division of the ARHS	Canberra	stored	3013 Blog Page
3016	4-6-0 mixed traffic	Beyer, Peacock & Company	1903	Canberra Railway Museum	Canberra	operational	3016 Blog Page
3026	4-6-0 mixed traffic	Beyer, Peacock & Company	1903	Lachlan Valley Railway	Cowra	stored
3028	4-6-0 mixed traffic	Beyer, Peacock & Company	1904	Dorrigo Steam Railway & Museum	Dorrigo	stored
3046	4-6-4T passenger	Beyer, Peacock & Company	1908	Dorrigo Steam Railway & Museum	Dorrigo	stored
3075	4-6-0 mixed traffic	Eveleigh Railway Workshops	1912	Parkes Apex Club	Kelly Reserve Parkes	static exhibit
3085	4-6-4T passenger	Eveleigh Railway Workshops	1912	Transport Heritage NSW	Goulburn	static exhibit	NSW Locomotive, Steam 3085
3090	4-6-0 mixed traffic	Eveleigh Railway Workshops	1912	Dorrigo Steam Railway & Museum	Dorrigo	stored
3102	4-6-0 mixed traffic	Beyer, Peacock & Company	1912	Canberra Railway Museum	Canberra	stored	3102 Blog Page
3112	4-6-4T passenger	Beyer, Peacock & Company	1914	The Picnic Train	Goulburn Railway Workshops	under restoration
3137	4-6-4T passenger	Eveleigh Railway Workshops	1916	Transport Heritage NSW	Thirlmere	static exhibit	NSW Locomotive, Steam 3137
3203	4-6-0 passenger	Beyer, Peacock & Company	1891	Transport Heritage NSW	Broadmeadow	stored	NSW Locomotive, Steam 3203
3214	4-6-0 passenger	Beyer, Peacock & Company	1891	Transport Heritage NSW	Valley Heights	cosmetic restoration
3237	4-6-0 passenger	Beyer, Peacock & Company	1892	Lachlan Valley Railway	Eveliegh	stored
3265	4-6-0 passenger	Beyer, Peacock & Company	1901	Powerhouse Museum	Thirlmere	operational	PHM Locomotive 3265
3526	4-6-0 passenger	Eveleigh Railway Workshops	1917	Transport Heritage NSW	Thirlmere	operational	NSW Locomotive, Steam 3526
3609	4-6-0 passenger	Eveleigh Railway Workshops	1928	Transport Heritage NSW	Junee	static exhibit	NSW Locomotive, Steam 3609
3616	4-6-0 passenger	Eveleigh Railway Workshops	1928	Transport Heritage NSW	Thirlmere	Stored
3642	4-6-0 passenger	Clyde Engineering	1926	Transport Heritage NSW	Thirlmere	operational	NSW Locomotive, Steam 3642
3801	4-6-2 express passenger	Clyde Engineering	1943	Transport Heritage NSW	Thirlmere	Operational	NSW Locomotive, Steam 3801
3813	4-6-2 express passenger	Cardiff Locomotive Workshops	1946	Dorrigo Steam Railway & Museum	Dorrigo	parts only
3820	4-6-2 express passenger	Eveleigh Railway Workshops	1947	Transport Heritage NSW	Thirlmere	static exhibit	NSW Locomotive, Steam 3820
3830	4-6-2 express passenger	Eveleigh Railway Workshops	1949	Powerhouse Museum	Thirlmere	Stored	PHM Locomotive 3830
5069	2-8-0 goods	Beyer, Peacock & Company	1903	Dorrigo Steam Railway & Museum	Dorrigo	stored
5096	2-8-0 goods	Clyde Engineering	1907	Transport Heritage NSW	Broadmeadow	stored	NSW Locomotive, Steam 5096
5112	2-8-0 goods	Clyde Engineering	1908	Bathurst Regional Council	Bathurst station	static display
5132	2-8-0 goods	Clyde Engineering	1909	Dorrigo Steam Railway & Museum	Dorrigo	stored
5353	2-8-0 goods	Clyde Engineering	1913	Dorrigo Steam Railway & Museum	Dorrigo	stored
5367	2-8-0 goods	Clyde Engineering	1914	Lachlan Valley Railway	Cowra	stored
5461	2-8-0 goods	Clyde Engineering	1915	Transport Heritage NSW	Valley Heights	static exhibit	NSW Locomotive, Steam 5461
5595	2-8-0 goods	Clyde Engineering	1912	Transport Heritage NSW	Thirlmere	static exhibit	NSW Locomotive, Steam 5595
5711	4-8-2 goods	Clyde Engineering	1929	Transport Heritage NSW	Valley Heights	static exhibit	NSW Locomotive, Steam 5711
5908	2-8-2 goods	Baldwin Locomotive Works	1952	Transport Heritage NSW	Goulburn	static exhibit	NSW Locomotive, Steam 5908
5910	2-8-2 goods	Baldwin Locomotive Works	1952	Transport Heritage NSW	Thirlmere	static exhibit	NSW Locomotive, Steam 5910
5916	2-8-2 goods	Baldwin Locomotive Works	1952	Transport Heritage NSW	Goulburn	sectioning proposed	Not Listed
5917	2-8-2 goods	Baldwin Locomotive Works	1953	The Picnic Train	Goulburn Railway Workshops	operational
5920	2-8-2 goods	Baldwin Locomotive Works	1953	Dorrigo Steam Railway & Museum	Dorrigo	stored	Dorrigo Webpage
6029	4-8-4+4-8-4 goods	Beyer, Peacock & Company	1956	Privately owned	Thirlmere	operational	Project 6029 Blog
6039	4-8-4+4-8-4 goods	Beyer, Peacock & Company	1956	Dorrigo Steam Railway & Museum	Dorrigo	stored	Dorrigo Webpage
6040	4-8-4+4-8-4 goods	Beyer, Peacock & Company	1956	Transport Heritage NSW	Thirlmere	static exhibit	NSW Locomotive, Steam 6040
6042	4-8-4+4-8-4 goods	Beyer, Peacock & Company	1956	Dorrigo Steam Railway & Museum	Forbes	stored	Dorrigo Webpage
No. 1	0-4-2 passenger	Robert Stephenson & Company	1855	Powerhouse Museum	Pyrmont	static exhibit	Powerhouse Museum No. 1
18	0-6-0 mixed traffic	Robert Stephenson & Company	1865	Transport Heritage NSW	Thirlmere	static exhibit
20N	0-6-0ST mixed traffic	Kitson & Company	1870	Newcastle Museum	Honeysuckle	static exhibit	Steam engine returns to Newcastle
78	0-4-2 mixed traffic	Eveleigh Railway Workshops	1877	Transport Heritage NSW	Thirlmere	static exhibit	NSW Locomotive, Steam 78
79	0-6-0 PWD Saddle Tank	Hunslet Engine Company	1938	Transport Heritage NSW	Thirlmere	static exhibit	NSW Locomotive, Steam 79
530 (former P127)	0-6-0ST	Vulcan Foundry	1877	Yass Railway Station Museum	Yass	static exhibit

== NSW Private Railways ==
Steam Locomotives
No.	Description	Manufacturer	Year	In service Railway	Current Organisation	Location	Status	Ref
"Juno"	0-4-0ST	Andrew Barclay Sons & Co	1922	Commonwealth Steel	Dorrigo Steam Railway & Museum	Dorrigo	stored
2	0-6-0ST	Avonside Engine Company	1916	Abermain Coal Company/J & A Brown	Dorrigo Steam Railway & Museum	Dorrigo	stored
2 "Stevo"	0-6-0ST	Robert Stephenson and Company	1899	Blue Circle Southern Cement	Valley Heights Steam Tramway	Valley Heights	Operational
3	0-6-0ST	Kitson & Company	1878	J & A Brown	Dorrigo Steam Railway & Museum	Dorrigo	stored
3	2-6-0T	Andrew Barclay Sons & Co	1911	Blue Circle Southern Cement	Dorrigo Steam Railway & Museum	Dorrigo	stored
4	0-4-0T	HK Porter	1915	Commonwealth Steel	Dorrigo Steam Railway & Museum	Dorrigo	stored
5	0-6-0T	Andrew Barclay Sons & Co	1916	Blue Circle Southern Cement	Dorrigo Steam Railway & Museum	Dorrigo	stored
"Corby"	0-4-0T	Peckett & Sons	1943	Tubemakers of Australia	Dorrigo Steam Railway & Museum	Dorrigo	stored
"Marian"	0-4-0T	Andrew Barclay Sons & Co	1948	John Lysaght	Dorrigo Steam Railway & Museum	Dorrigo	stored
"Badger"	0-6-0T	Australian Iron & Steel	1943	Australian Iron & Steel	Dorrigo Steam Railway & Museum	Dorrigo	stored
BHP No. 16	0-4-0T	H.K. Porter	1920	BHP's Newcastle Steelworks	Vietnam Veterans Association of Australia	St Marys	Static	Australian Steam
SMR 14	0-8-2T	Avonside Engine Company	1909	South Maitland Railway	Dorrigo Steam Railway & Museum	Dorrigo	stored
ROD 20	2-8-0	North British Locomotive Company	1918	J & A Brown	Dorrigo Steam Railway & Museum	Dorrigo	stored
ROD 24	2-8-0	Great Central Railway	1918	J & A Brown	Dorrigo Steam Railway & Museum	Dorrigo	stored
27	0-4-0ST	Avonside Engine Company	1900	J & A Brown	Dorrigo Steam Railway & Museum	Dorrigo	stored
N/A	0-4-0	Appleby	1900	Hexham Engineering	Dorrigo Steam Railway & Museum	Dorrigo	stored
9 Pelaw Main	2-8-2T	Kitson & Company	1908	J & A Brown	Richmond Vale Railway Museum	Kurri Kurri	stored
10 Richmond Main	2-8-2T	Kitson & Company	1911	J & A Brown	Richmond Vale Railway Museum	Kurri Kurri	stored
SMR 10	2-8-2T	Beyer, Peacock & Company	1911	South Maitland Railway	Hunter Valley Training Company	East Greta Junction	operational, stored
SMR 17	2-8-2T	Beyer, Peacock & Company	1915	South Maitland Railway	Dorrigo Steam Railway & Museum	Dorrigo	transfer and preservation
SMR 18	2-8-2T	Beyer, Peacock & Company	1911	South Maitland Railway	Hunter Valley Training Company	East Greta Junction	operational, stored
SMR 19	2-8-2T	Beyer, Peacock & Company	1915	South Maitland Railway	Richmond Vale Railway Museum	Kurri Kurri	pending restoration
SMR 20	2-8-2T	Beyer, Peacock & Company	1915	South Maitland Railway	Dorrigo Steam Railway & Museum	Dorrigo	transfer and preservation
SMR 22	2-8-2T	Beyer, Peacock & Company	1920	South Maitland Railway	Richmond Vale Railway Museum	Kurri Kurri	Static
SMR 23	2-8-2T	Beyer, Peacock & Company	1915	South Maitland Railway	Dorrigo Steam Railway & Museum	Dorrigo	transfer and preservation
SMR 24	2-8-2T	Beyer, Peacock & Company	1922	South Maitland Railway	Richmond Vale Railway Museum	Kurri Kurri	Overhaul
SMR 25	2-8-2T	Beyer, Peacock & Company	1922	South Maitland Railway	Richmond Vale Railway Museum	Kurri Kurri	stored
SMR 26	2-8-2T	Beyer, Peacock & Company	1915	South Maitland Railway	Dorrigo Steam Railway & Museum	Dorrigo	transfer and preservation
SMR 27	2-8-2T	Beyer, Peacock & Company	1915	South Maitland Railway	Dorrigo Steam Railway & Museum	Dorrigo	transfer and preservation
SMR 28	2-8-2T	Beyer, Peacock & Company	1915	South Maitland Railway	Dorrigo Steam Railway & Museum	Dorrigo	transfer and preservation
SMR 30	2-8-2T	Beyer, Peacock & Company	1924	South Maitland Railway	Richmond Vale Railway Museum	Kurri Kurri	Overhaul
SMR 31	2-8-2T	Beyer, Peacock & Company	1915	South Maitland Railway	Dorrigo Steam Railway & Museum	Dorrigo	transfer and preservation
BHP 2	60T Crane	Industrial Works	1913	BHP Newcastle Steelworks	Richmond Vale Railway Museum	Kurri Kurri	pending restoration
BHP 5	15T Crane	Industrial Brownhoist	1920	BHP Newcastle Steelworks	Richmond Vale Railway Museum	Kurri Kurri	undergoing restoration
ROD 23	2-8-0	Great Central Railway	1918	J & A Brown	Richmond Vale Railway Museum	Kurri Kurri	static display
5 "The Major"	0-6-4T	Beyer, Peacock & Company	1885	J & A Brown	Transport Heritage NSW	Thirlmere	stored
4	0-6-0ST	Kitson & Company	1870	J & A Brown	Newcastle Museum	Newcastle	Static Display (see 20N)
"Alison"	0-4-0ST	Andrew Barclay Sons & Co	1922	John Lysaght	Richmond Vale Railway Museum	Kurri Kurri	static display
"Marjorie"	0-4-0ST	Clyde Engineering	1938	John Lysaght	Richmond Vale Railway Museum	Kurri Kurri	Operational
"Kathleen"	0-4-0ST	Avonside Engine Company	1921	John Lysaght	Richmond Vale Railway Museum	Kurri Kurri	undergoing restoration
Wallaby	0-4-0ST	Hawthorn Leslie & Company	1913	Hoskins Lithgow Steel Works	Illawarra Light Railway Museum	Albion Park	static exhibit	Wallaby
Burra	0-4-0ST	Hawthorn Leslie & Company	1923	Australian Iron & Steel	Illawarra Light Railway Museum	Albion Park	operational	Burra
Kiama	0-4-0ST	Davenport Locomotive Works	1913	NSW Public Works Dept	Illawarra Light Railway Museum	Albion Park	operational	Kiama
Kiama Fowler	0-4-0	John Fowler & Co	1923	Kiama Quarries	Illawarra Light Railway Museum	Albion Park	stored	Kiama Fowler

== Sources ==
- RailCorp: RailCorp S170 Heritage and Conservation Register. NSW Department of Environment and Heritage 2012
