= New South Wales Z24 class locomotive =

Class of Australian 2-6-0 locomotives

New South Wales Z24 class
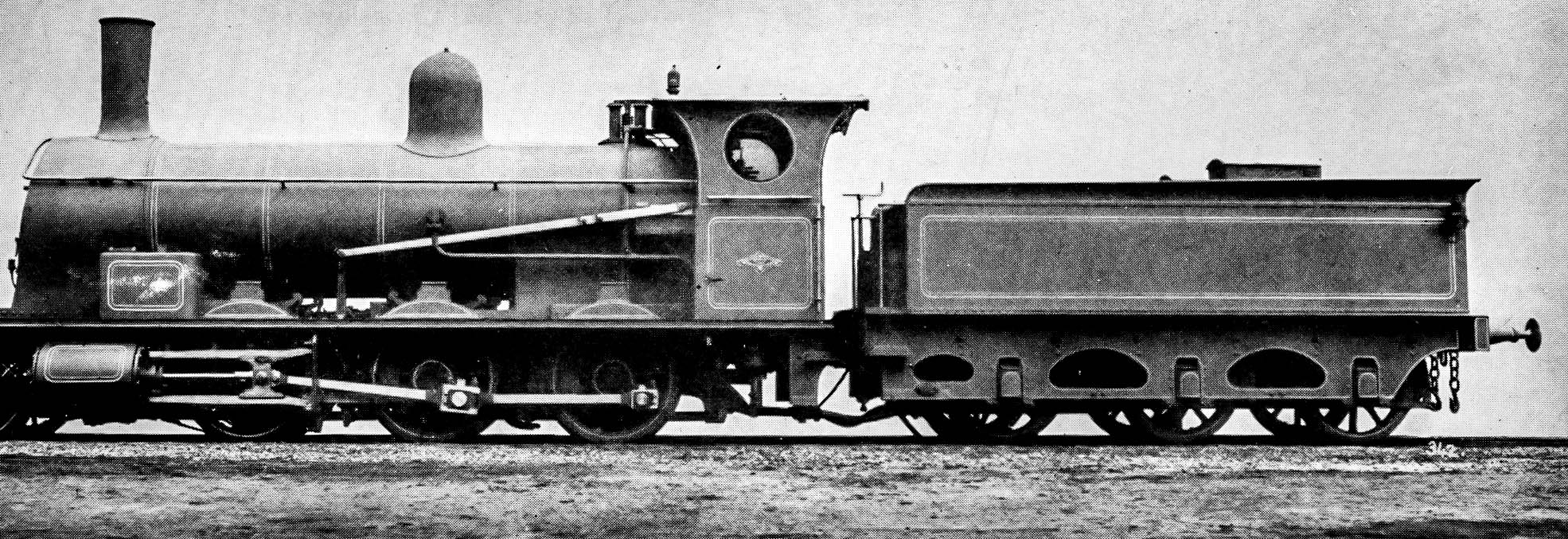
- Class Z24 locomotive
Type and origin
- Power type: Steam
- Builder: Dübs & Company
- Build date: 1889
- Total produced: 25
Specifications
- Configuration
  - Whyte: 2-6-0
  - UIC: 1'Cn
- Gauge: 4 ft 8 1/2 in (1,435 mm) standard gauge
- Driver dia.: 4 ft 0 in (1,219 mm)
- Adhesive weight: 84,000 lb (38,102 kg)
- Loco weight: 104,000 lb (47,174 kg)
- Firebox
  - Grate area: 21 sq ft (2.0 m^{2})
- Boiler pressure: 140 psi (965 kPa)
- Heating surface: 1,410 sq ft (131 m^{2})
- Superheater: None
- Cylinders: 2 outside
- Cylinder size: 18 in × 26 in (457 mm × 660 mm)
Performance figures
- Tractive effort: 20,855 lbf (92.77 kN)
- Factor of adh.: 4.00
Career
- Operators: New South Wales Government Railways
- Class: B55, Z24 from 1924
- Numbers: 55-78, 388-393, 407-410 (2401-2425 from 1924)
- Retired: 1929–1960
- Disposition: 4 preserved, 21 scrapped

The Z24 class (formerly B55 class) is a two-cylinder, non-condensing, saturated 2-6-0 ‘ Mogul‘ type steam engine built by Dübs & Company for the New South Wales Government Railways of Australia.

== Order ==
Following the success of the B205 class, in 1889 the New South Wales Government Railways ordered an additional 25 locomotives of a basically similar design from Dübs & Company. These locomotives had a deeper firebox, steel cab and weighed an extra nine tonnes. They were pooled with the B205 class in general working. The first locomotive entered traffic on 10 March 1891 and all were in service by August that year.

== Operation ==
They took a generally unobtrusive part in main line goods traffic until displaced by the D50/D53/D55 class locomotives. They then moved on to branch lines until displaced by the C30T class locomotives which arrived in the mid-1920s.

== Demise and preservation ==
As boiler renewals became due between 1929 and 1960, their numbers were depleted through either scrapping or disposal. Representatives found their way on to the private lines of such organisations as Bunnerong Power Station, Nepean Sand & Gravel at North Richmond and Hunter Valley collieries.

The last locomotive withdrawn was 2413 in November 1960, following an enthusiast tour to Richmond. It joined 2408 and 2414 at Bunnerong Power Station until 1975.

Preserved Z24 class locomotives
No.	Year	Current organisation	Location	Status	Ref
2408	1891	Dorrigo Steam Railway & Museum	Dorrigo	Stored	
2413	1891	Junee Roundhouse Railway Museum	Junee Roundhouse Railway Museum	Static display	
2414	1891	Dorrigo Steam Railway & Museum	Dorrigo	Stored	
2419	1891	Transport Heritage NSW	Goulburn Rail Heritage Centre	static display	
