= South Maitland Railways 10 Class =

Australian 2-8-2T locomotives

South Maitland Railways 10 class
- 10 at East Greta Junction in November 2010
Type and origin
- Power type: Steam
- Builder: Beyer, Peacock & Company, Manchester
- Build date: 1911–25
- Total produced: 14
Specifications
- Configuration
  - UIC: 2-8-2T
- Gauge: 4 ft 8 1/2 in (1,435 mm)
- Leading dia.: 2 ft 9 in (0.838 m)
- Driver dia.: 4 ft 3 in (1.295 m)
- Trailing dia.: 2 ft 9 in (0.838 m)
- Wheelbase: Coupled: 15 ft 0 in (4.57 m); Overall: 31 ft 4 in (9.55 m)
- Length: 41 ft 11 in (12.78 m) over buffers
- Width: 9 ft 7 in (2.92 m)
- Height: 13 ft 2 in (4.01 m)
- Axle load: 15 long tons 12 cwt (34,900 lb or 15.9 t)
- Adhesive weight: 61 long tons 15 cwt (138,300 lb or 62.7 t)
- Loco weight: 83 long tons 10 cwt (187,000 lb or 84.8 t)
- Fuel type: Coal
- Fuel capacity: 4 long tons 0 cwt (9,000 lb or 4.1 t)
- Water cap.: 2,400 imp gal (11,000 L; 2,900 US gal)
- Firebox
  - Grate area: 28.7 sq ft (2.67 m^{2})
- Boiler pressure: 180 lbf/in^{2} (1.24 MPa)
- Heating surface
  - Tubes: 1,685 sq ft (156.5 m^{2})
  - Total surface: 1,838 sq ft (170.8 m^{2})
- Cylinders: Two, outside
- Cylinder size: 20 in × 26 in (508 mm × 660 mm)
Performance figures
- Tractive effort: 31,210 lbf (138.83 kN)
Career
- Operators: South Maitland Railway
- Class: South Maitland Railways 10 class
- Number in class: 14
- Numbers: 10, 17–20, 22–28, 30–31
- First run: 1911
- Current owner: Dorrigo Steam Railway & Museum; Hunter Valley Training Company; Richmond Vale Railway Museum
- Disposition: all preserved

The South Maitland Railways 10 class locomotives is a class of 14 2-8-2T steam locomotives built for the East Greta Coal Company (later South Maitland Railway) by Beyer, Peacock & Company in Manchester, England, between 1911 and 1925. Members of this class of locomotive were the last steam locomotives in commercial use in Australia.

== Background information ==
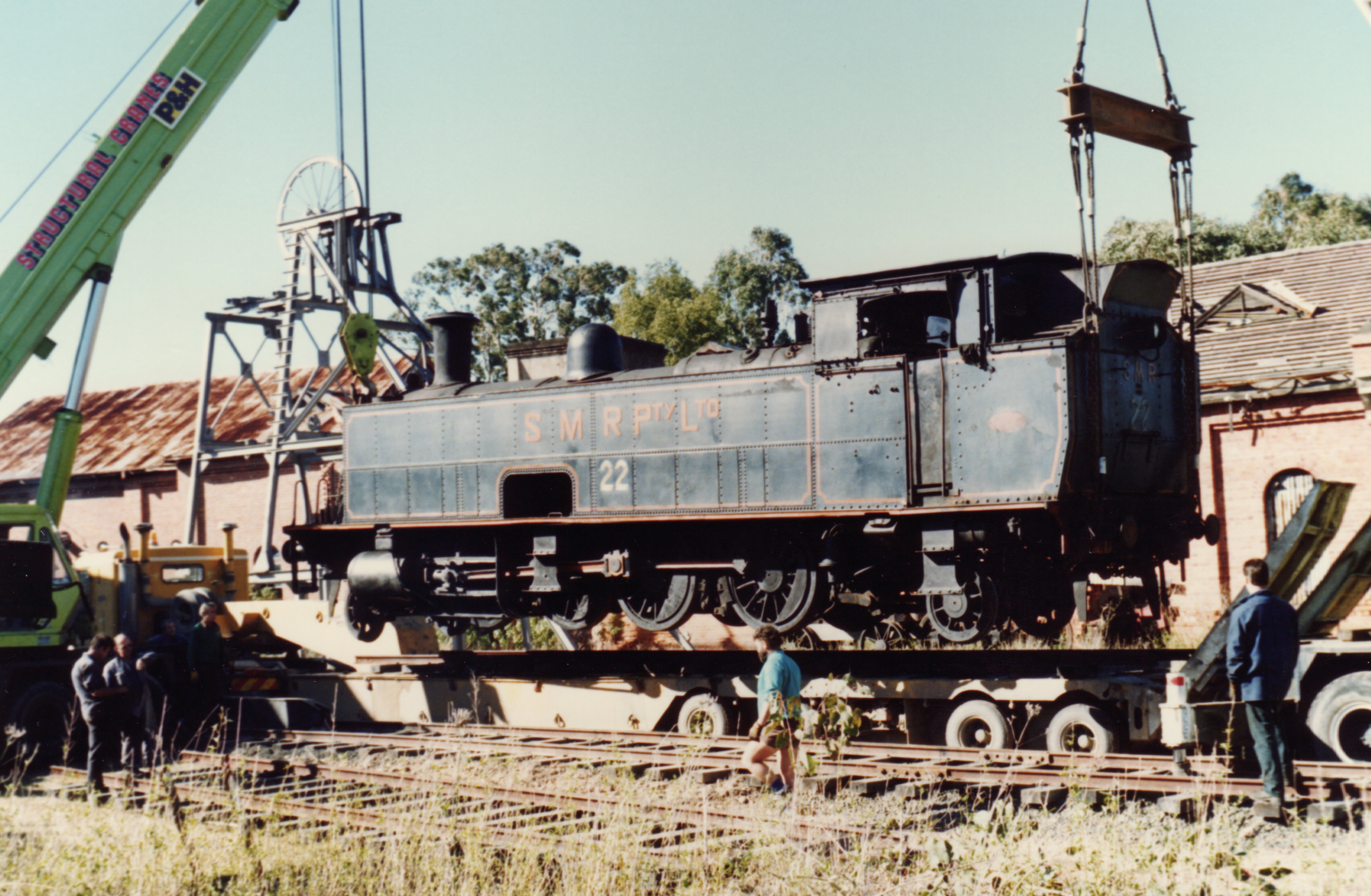
22 being unloaded after being transported by road from Hexham in July 1989

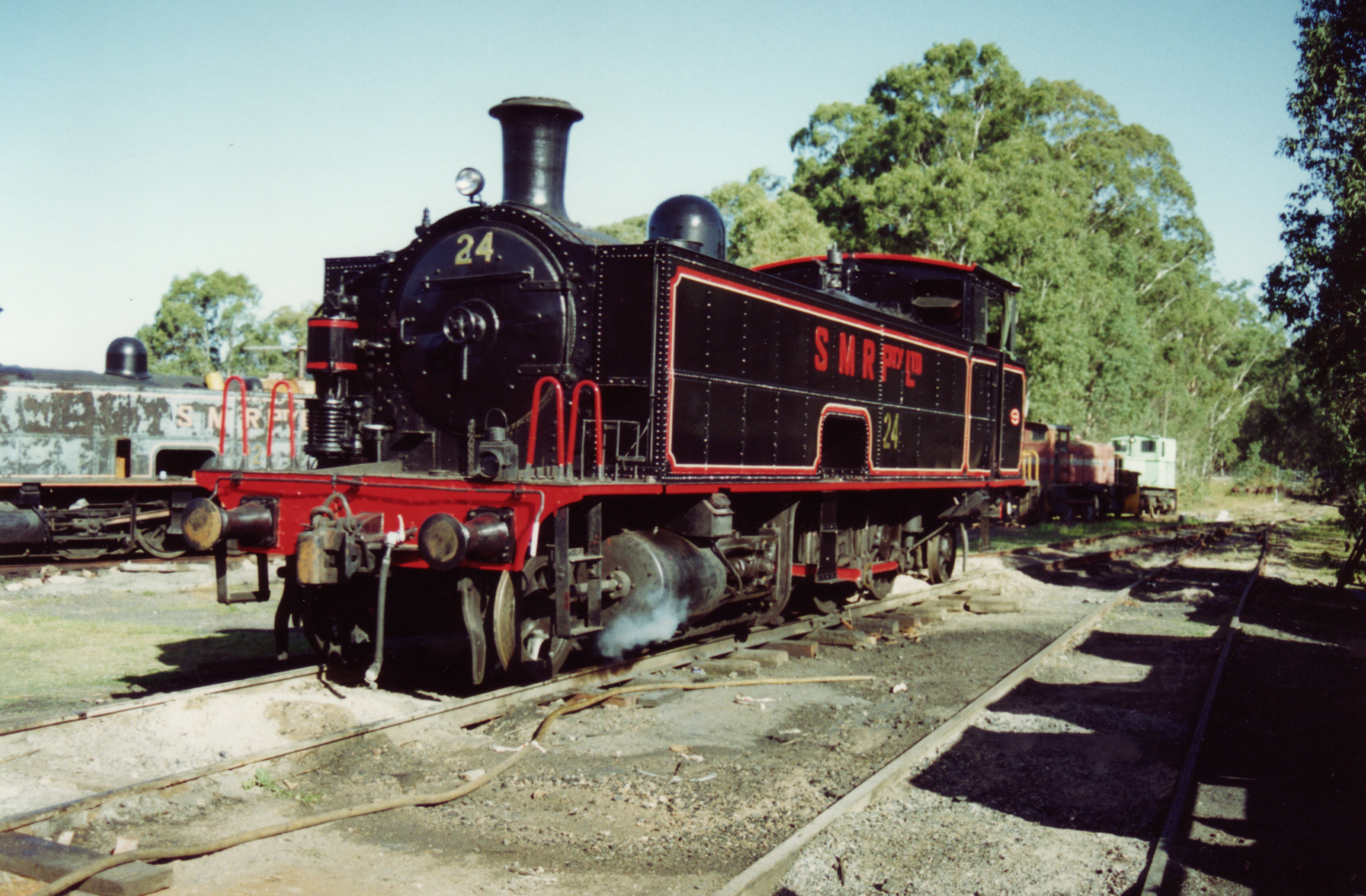
24 freshly painted & lined after completion of boiler repairs in May 1993

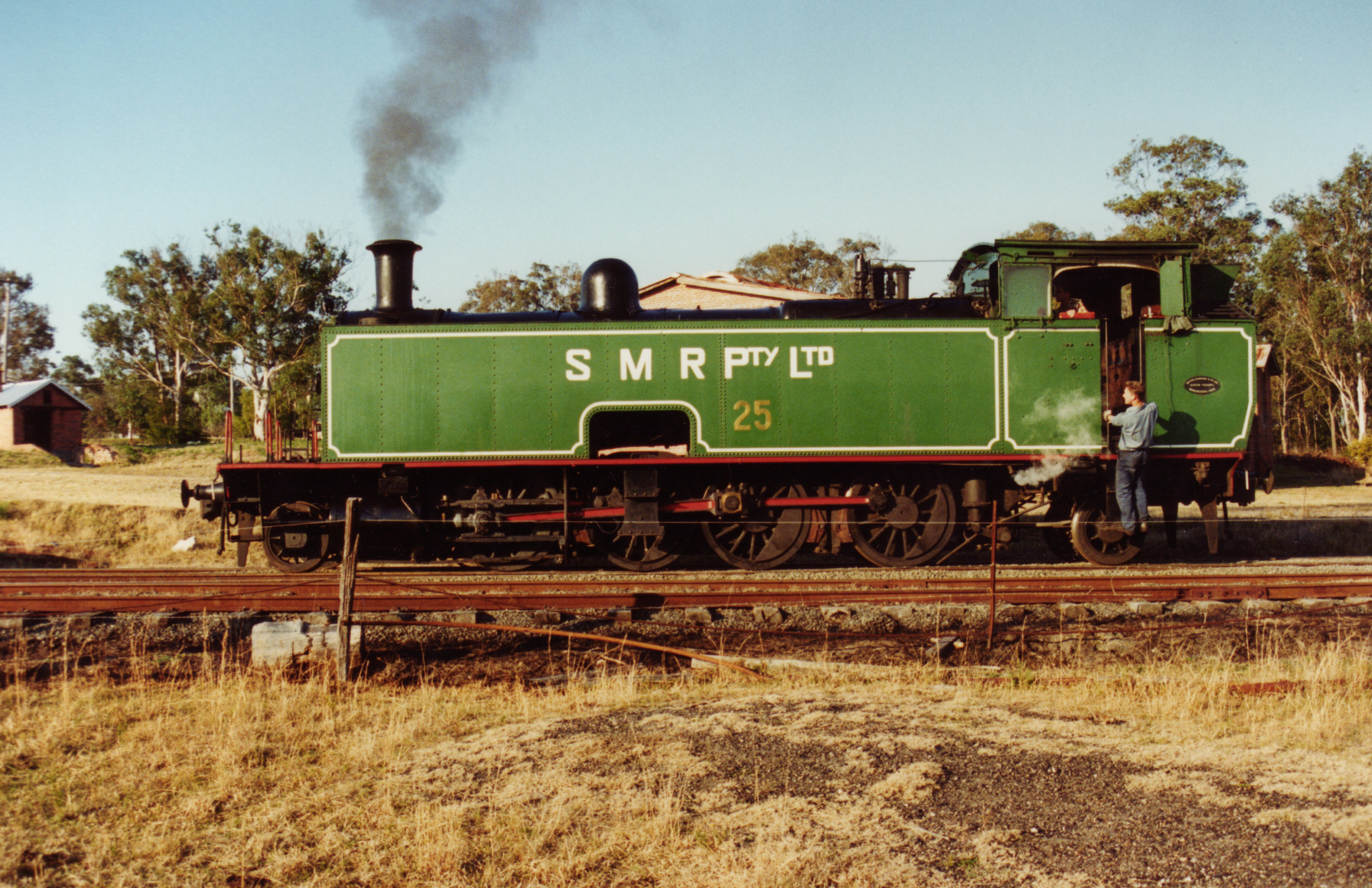
25 at Pelaw Main Colliery in 1995

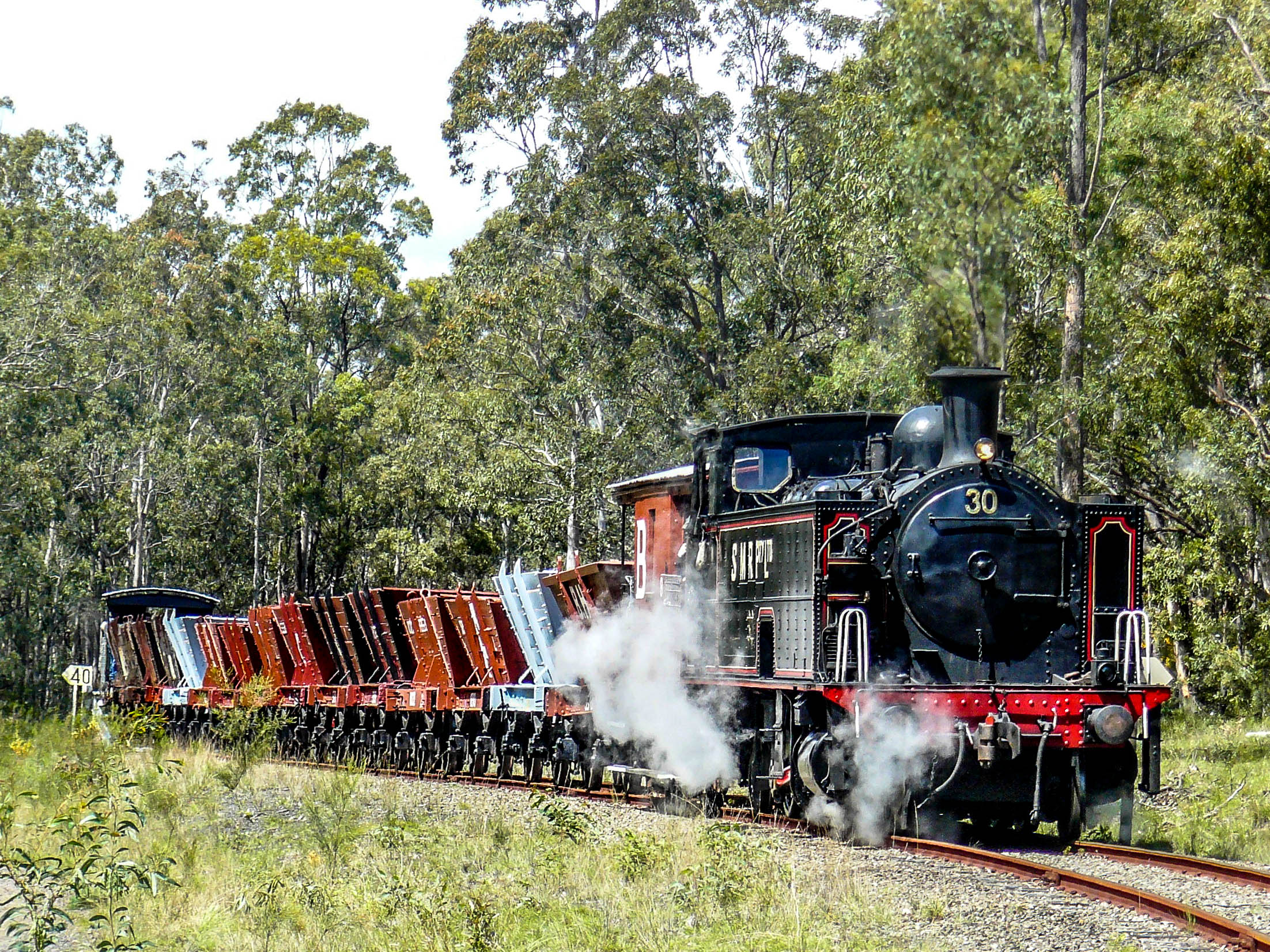
30 at Pelaw Main in September 2007

30 at Pelaw Main station, for the 20th anniversary of the Richmond Vale Railway's closure in September 2007

The East Greta Coal Company had constructed its railway empire based on a motley group of secondhand and borrowed steam locomotives, which by 1910, was fast becoming insufficient to move the great loads coming from the Greta Seam which ran right through the South Maitland coalfield. Standardised motive power was sought, and a melding of the New South Wales Government Railways' P(6) 4-6-0 and T(524) 2-8-0 designs brought about the 10 class.

The locomotives were generally known as the '10' class, as the class leader was numbered as that company's 2nd No. 10. The fourteen locomotives were numbered where they could be accommodated within the East Greta Coal Company numbering system. This proved haphazard, the numbers allocated being 2nd No. 10 (later 10), 17–20, 22-28 and 30–31.

== In service ==
The locomotives were delivered in knocked down form, and erected onsite at the East Greta Junction Workshops (colloquially known as the 'Red Shed'). They were primarily used to haul coal trains.

This remained consistent until the 1950s, when a sharp downturn in demand for coal led to certain members of the class being set aside as boiler work was required. With an upturn in the late 1960s, and the purchase by Coal & Allied (C&A) in 1967 of Hebburn Limited which gave C&A 100% ownership of South Maitland Railway. As C&A also owned the former J & A Brown Richmond Vale Railway a study was undertaken on the costs involved in having new boilers built by outside suppliers for both the 10 class and the J&A Brown ROD locomotives. It was determined to be of greater benefit to allow the remaining RODs to work out their economic lives, and to start a system of repairing the 10 class as soon as possible for the revived traffic.

On 21 March 1973, 23 arrived at Hexham to assist in the movement of coal from the mine at Stockrington on the former J&A Brown railway. This would begin a 14-year association of the 10 class with this system, with each class member spending at least a few weeks in service there. All maintenance at this time was undertaken at East Greta Junction, with the locomotives being transferred dead on empty and loaded coal trains.

Steam on the South Maitland Railway system ended in June 1983, with 31 bringing in the last load, and 22, with van in tow, bringing in the last steam-hauled revenue train to traverse the South Maitland Railway, with great ceremony. From then until September 1987, East Greta Junction Workshops became solely devoted to providing four 10 class at all times to Hexham, with the others in storage, except 19, which was on display at Port Waratah Coal Loader.

== SMR 10 class at Hexham ==
Following the handover of operations of the SMR to the State Rail Authority, the 10 class remained in service on the truncated J&A Brown railway between Stockrington and Hexham. As steam on all State Government systems in Australia had ended in the 1970s, this was the last commercial steam train operation in Australia, attracting much media attention. In September 1987, Coal & Allied announced that the line would soon close, with all coal haulage going to road. The last remained crews at Hexham protested and blockaded the entrance to the loader, using 30 and a rake of wagons. After a long standoff, during which the men were sacked and stripped of their entitlements, 30 hauled the last loaded coal train from Stockrington loader to Hexham Washery, and later 25, on 22 September 1987, hauled the last revenue steam-hauled train in Australia, a string of empties to be stored at Hexham.

== Last gasp ==
The C&A employees, however, were still not satisfied with the outcome, and protested the cancellation of the steam program. The men were dismissed, and in combination with their pleas being unheard, they lit up SMR 25, and ran it light engine over the swamp and to a location near Lenaghan's Drive, where a public protest was staged. Local farmers assisted with water supplies, and a sympathetic truck driver 'dropped' some coal nearby. This protest lasted for three weeks until the men were reinstated and their entitlements reissued, and on 15 October 1987, 25 became the last steam locomotive to cross Hexham Swamp, ending 130 years of continuous steam operation in this locale.

== Preservation ==
The 10 class are unique, along with 3801, in being the only steam locomotives protected by the National Trust of Australia.

Moves to preserve these locomotives began in the late 1970s, with the New South Wales Rail Transport Museum and the Richmond Vale Railway Museum making approaches to Coal & Allied to preserve at least one of the locomotives upon withdrawal, however these requests were refused. The first of the class to be preserved was 19, which had been withdrawn awaiting overhaul and had its leading bogie used to repair 31 following damage in a 1982 accident at Fishery Creek. Unit 19 was gutted and placed on display on a plinth at Port Waratah Coal Loader, with three non-air hoppers and an ex J&A Brown brake van. In 2000 it was moved into storage to be cosmetically restored, along with the wagons, but this never eventuated. In 2009, 19 and the wagons were donated to the Richmond Vale Railway Museum, and 19 is now on static display, with a view to completing the static restoration in the near future.

Following the cessation of steam services on the South Maitland Railway in 1983, those not required for Hexham workings was stored in the former loco shed at East Greta Junction. Moves were made to preserve the locomotives as a whole, unique in New South Wales. In 1989, 22, 24, 25 and 30, which were stored at Hexham, were placed in the care of the Richmond Vale Railway Museum by C & A, and were transferred there on 6 July 1989, where 24 became the first of the group to steam in preservation on 22 July 1989. 25 quickly followed after some repairs to the firebox, and the two locomotives were the mainstay of the museum's operations for many years. Both locomotives were withdrawn awaiting boiler lifts to allow for a full external boiler inspection in the late 1990s. Unit 30 was returned to service in April 2000. In 2009 30 was retired with serious mechanical problems. Its running gear is to be replaced with that of a classmates however this is a long-term project. Unit 22 was dismantled with a view to a return to steam in the early 1990s, however this was deemed to be uneconomical, and the locomotive was reassembled and put on static display at the museum. Unit 25 is in store underneath the former screens of Richmond Main mine. Two units 24 and 30 have been dismantled with the view to use the best of both locomotives where the boiler was inspected in 2018 due to a THNSW grant and a view in having one operational by 2025 depending on funding.

In the late 1980s, the Hunter Valley Training Company was granted ownership of the remaining nine locomotives. Units 10 and 18 were overhauled by the Friends of the South Maitland Railways, and made their public debut at the Hunter Valley Steamfest 1990, with 10 in steam and 18 on static display. The locomotives made regular appearances at this event in the ensuing years, including Steamfest 1991, which saw 10, 17 and 18 in steam together at East Greta Junction, 17 being in steam after some political pressure was laid on in order to obtain a two-day boiler certificate for 17. This was the first time three 10 class had been in steam together since 1987, and would be the last to date. The climax of these was in 1994, when 18 and 3112 hauled the first tourist trains since 1983 on the SMR, topping and tailing between Neath and East Greta Junction, and 10 and the HVTC's diesel shunter 7307 gave brakevan rides in East Greta Junction yard.

In 1995, 18 was placed on permanent loan to 3801 Limited, to operate The Cockatoo Run from Wollongong to Moss Vale. After The Cockatoo Run ceased in 1998 it was stored at Eveleigh Railway Workshops. The locomotive was sent to Bradken Rail's workshops at Braemar and overhauled, and transferred to Hunter Valley Railway Works at Rothbury in early 2007. Unit 18 was significantly modified whilst under 3801 Limited's care, including but not limited to an extended self-cleaning smokebox, replacement welded tanks, a complete mechanical ash pan and hopper release, and an enlarged bunker, all of which (excluding the bunker) it still carries.

Unit 10 was retired to the shed in the late 1990s, and was dismantled by apprentices in 2002, but the project stalled. Unit 10 was then transferred to Hunter Valley Railway Works, Rothbury, where it was reassembled using 27's boiler and tanks, and made its return to steam in September 2005, double-heading a train to Newcastle and return with 3801. The locomotive made three more public appearances following this tour – Steamfest 2006, on display at East Greta Junction, Great Northern Railway 150, March 2007, shuttle trips from Newcastle to Broadmeadow, and Steamfest 2007, a one-off tour to Newcastle with 18. On 5 November 2010, 10 and 18 steamed back into their original home at East Greta Junction for preservation. On 5 August 2011, 10 and 18 top and tailed a special passenger train along their old stomping ground to Neath and back to celebrate the 30th anniversary of the Hunter Valley Training Company, 125 years since the discovery of the Greta coal seam and the 100th Anniversary of the delivery of 10 to the East Greta Coal Company.

In 2012, after discussions between 3801 Limited, the Hunter Valley Training Company and the Friends of the South Maitland Railway, a series of tours around the Sydney suburban network using 18 were announced. After a trial on 22 February 2012, 18 was deemed to have issues with at least one driving wheel bearing and was declared to be unfit for the tours. On 23 February 2012, a decision was made to prepare and trial 10 for these tours. Unfortunately the trials conducted the following day revealed a similar problem, and the movement of one or both locos to Sydney, and the tour schedule, was cancelled. Both locomotives were disposed and securely stored in the 'Red Shed' under tarpaulins. In late 2012 the 'Red Shed' was leased to Bradken Rail as a storage/maintenance centre for their two BK class diesel-electric locomotives. This left 10 and 18 exposed to the elements, until HVTC constructed a small, non-serviced single road storage shed with 10 and 18 moved in late 2012. They were used in 2014 but then stored again. As of August 2018 both units underwent boiler inspections and washouts and being prepared for late 2018 or within the next 2 years.

The remainder of the locomotives – 17, 20, 23, 26, 27, 28 and 31 – were sold to Chris Richards in 1990, and transferred to Hunter Valley Railway Works, Rothbury. Unit 17 was pressed into sporadic service on the former Ayrfield Colliery branch hauling tour trains, however this ceased in the late 1990s. Unit 23 was overhauled by the Friends of South Maitland Railways and Hunter Valley Training Company in 1998, and was painted in a powder blue livery and had a Pyle National headlight fitted. In 2002, 23 was posed in the refuge at Branxton, in steam for that year's Steamfest, however has not made any public appearances since. The remainder of the locomotives are stored in as-withdrawn condition. In April 2013 these seven locomotives were sold to the Dorrigo Steam Railway & Museum.

== The 10 class in the media ==
Being the last steam locomotives in Australia, the 10 class have had more than their fair share of media attention. The documentaries 'Destiny of Steam', 'The Richmond Vale Railway', 'Hearts of Fire', 'Return to Steam' and 'Farewell to Steam', all rating well on major television networks, all feature the 10 class in a large proportion.

The 10 class, and the stories of their final days at Hexham, were featured in major articles in Woman's Day and National Geographic magazines.

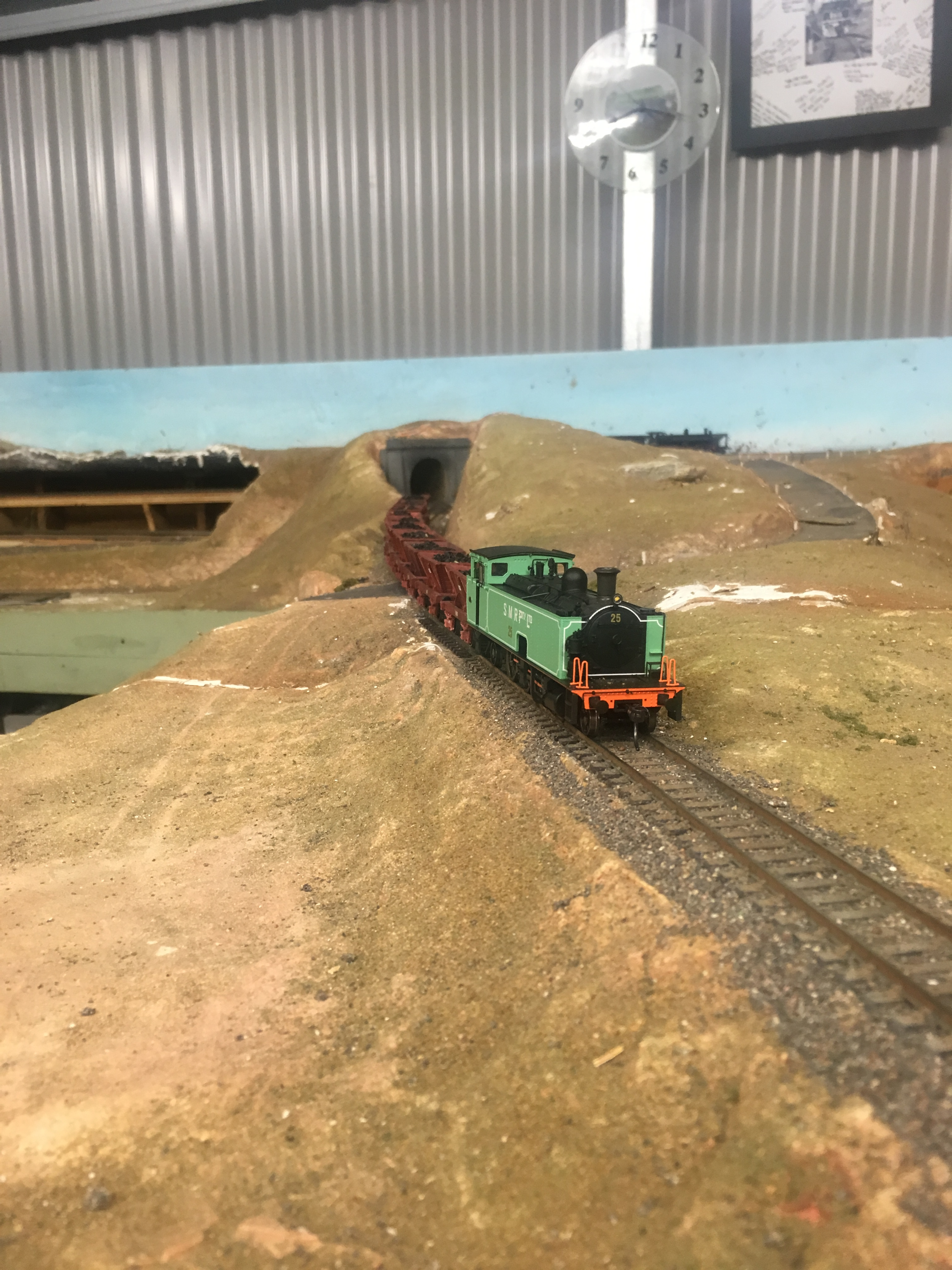

== Modelling ==
A Lloyd's/FSM HO Scale 10 class, modelled on SMR 10 as preserved in 1990, running on Coalfields Model Railway Club's layout 'Ashlington'.

A HO scale whitemetal kit of the SMR 10 class was produced in the 1970s by FSM (Fine Scale Models), and the moulds were later sold to Casula Hobbies. Under an arrangement with Casula Hobbies, Lloyds Model Railways designed an etched brass chassis for the kit and, together with Casula Hobbies, sold the model as a complete kit. In 2009 Ezi-Kits sold a small number of kits which had been acquired from Lloyds Model Railways.

In 2016, Southern Rail Models announced their intention to produce a ready-to-run (RTR) proprietary model of the 10 class. This model was released for general sale in October 2017, and covers all variants from 10 as originally delivered, to the ultimate in 25, as withdrawn in October 1987. This model is widely considered to be a premier Australian steam outline RTR model, and is available from Southern Rail Models
