= Z26 =

Z26 may refer to:

- German destroyer Z26, a Type 1936A-class destroyer built for the Kriegsmarine during World War II
- New South Wales Z26 class locomotive, (formally I.17 class), a class of steam locomotives built by for the New South Wales Government Railways of Australia
- Zlín Z 26, family of aircraft that was based on a basic training aircraft, the Z-26
