= Locomotive No. 1 =

Historic New South Wales rolling stock

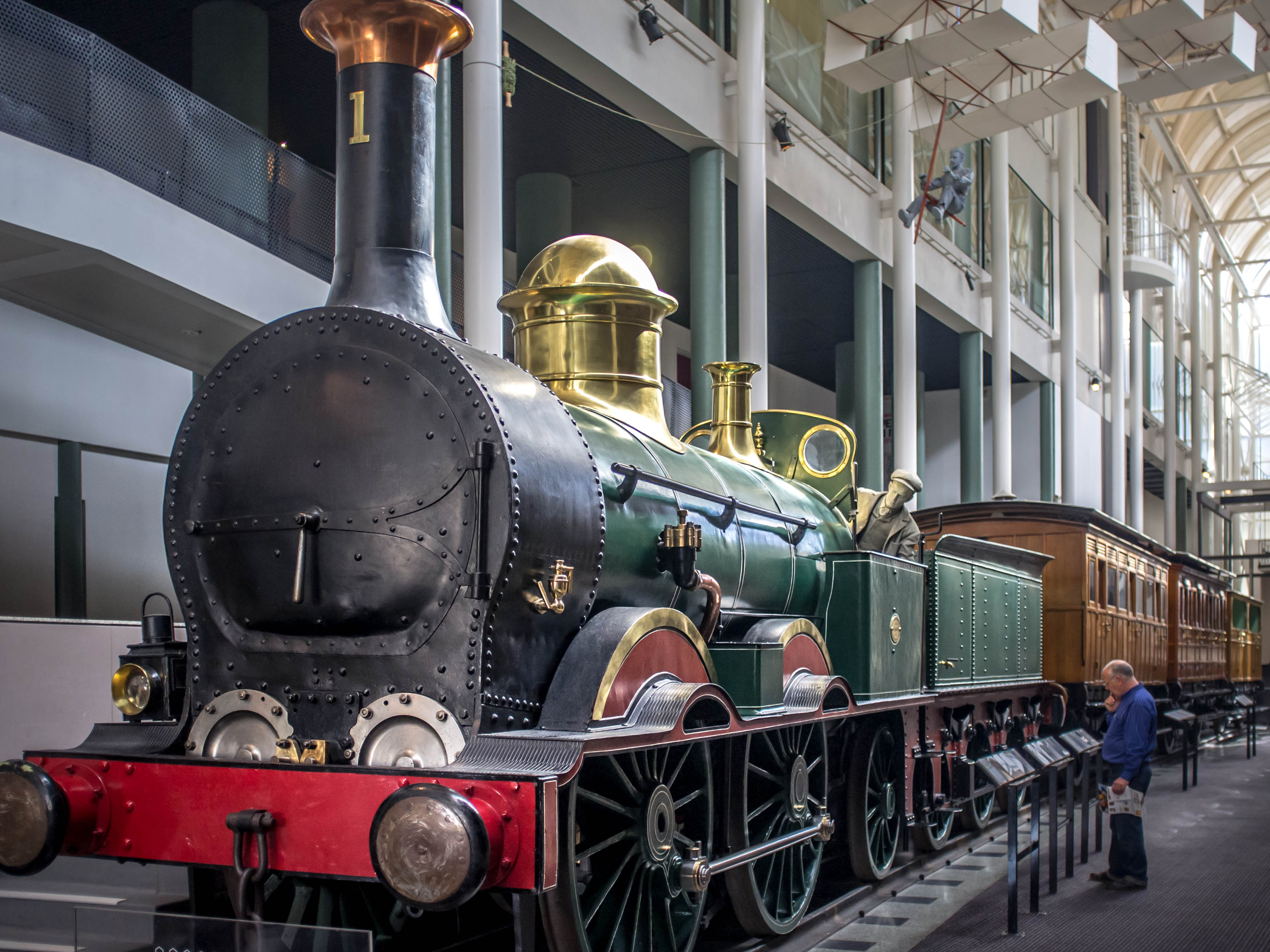
- No. 1 on static display at the Powerhouse Museum
Type and origin
- Power type: Steam
- Designer: James McConnell
- Builder: Robert Stephenson and Company
- Serial number: 958
- Build date: 1854
Specifications
- Configuration
  - Whyte: 0-4-2
- Gauge: 4 ft 8 1/2 in (1,435 mm) standard gauge
- Driver dia.: 5 ft 6 in (1,676 mm)
- Wheelbase: 14 ft 2 in (4.32 m)
- Loco weight: 26 long tons 1 cwt 1 qr (58,380 lb or 26.48 t)
- Fuel type: Coal
- Fuel capacity: 4 long tons (4.1 tonnes; 4.5 short tons)
- Water cap.: 2,000 imp gal (9,100 L; 2,400 US gal)
- Firebox
  - Grate area: 13.8 sq ft (1.28 m^{2})
- Boiler pressure: 120 lbf/in^{2} (830 kPa)
- Heating surface
  - Firebox: 85.3 sq ft (7.92 m^{2})
  - Tubes: 1,060 sq ft (98 m^{2})
- Cylinders: Two
- Cylinder size: 16 in × 24 in (406 mm × 610 mm)
Performance figures
- Tractive effort: 8,900 lbf (40 kN)
Career
- Operators: Sydney Railway Company
- Class: 1
- Number in class: 4
- Numbers: 1
- Delivered: January 1855
- First run: 24 May 1855
- Last run: 15 May 1877
- Retired: 1877
- Current owner: Powerhouse Museum
- Disposition: On static display

Locomotive No. 1 is a 0-4-2 "Stephenson" type steam locomotive, it hauled the first passenger train in New South Wales, Australia. It was built by Robert Stephenson and Company in 1854. In 1846, the Sydney Railway Company was formed with the objective of building a railway line between Sydney and Parramatta. No. 1 was one of four locomotives that arrived by sea from the manufacturer in January 1855. The first passenger train hauled by No. 1 was a special service from Sydney Station to Long Cove viaduct (near the present site of Lewisham) on 24 May 1855, Queen Victoria's birthday.

A common misconception is that Locomotive No. 1 hauled the first train at the grand opening of the first New South Wales railway, on 26 September 1855. In fact, No. 1 was in need of maintenance that day and not in steam. Its identical sister locomotive No. 3 worked the first passenger train from Sydney at 9:00 am and this was followed by the official train at 12:00 noon hauled by No. 2, driven by William Sixsmith and fireman William Webster.

== Design ==
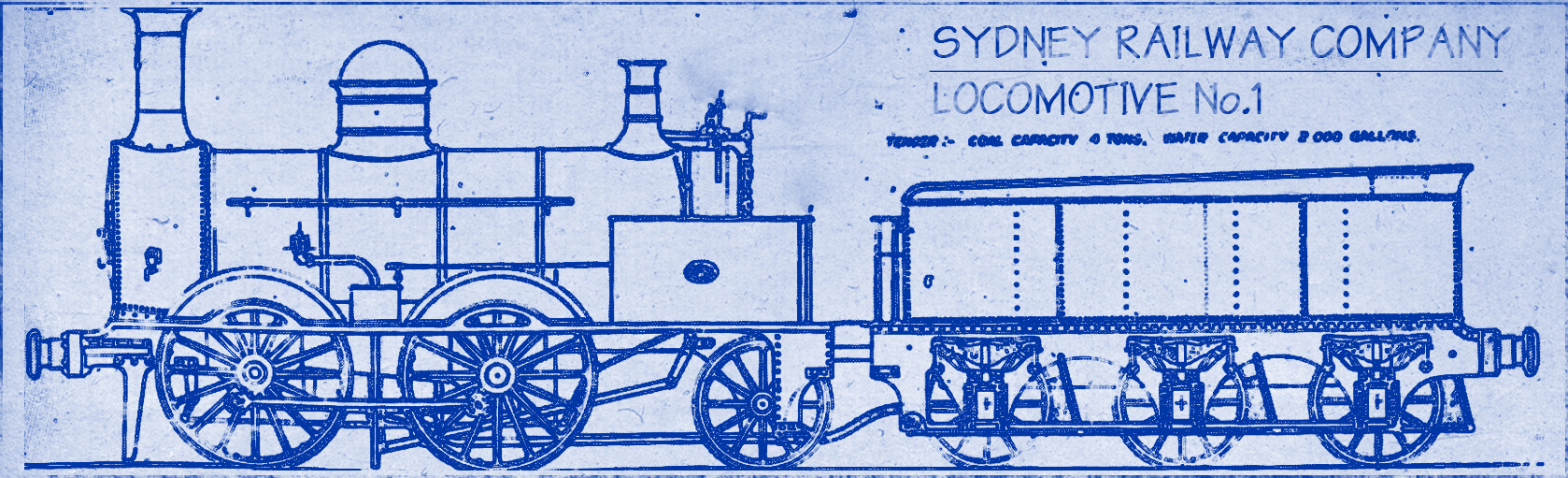
Drawing General Arrangement

Locomotive No. 1 is the only locomotive designed by James McConnell to have been preserved. McConnell was the Locomotive Superintendent of the London and North Western Railway (LNWR) Southern Division at Wolverton railway works and the Sydney Railway Company's Consulting Engineer at the time of the railway order.

The design of Locomotive No. 1 was a 0-4-2 modification of the 'Wolverton Express Goods' 0-6-0 introduced on the LNWR in 1854. James McConnell appointed William Scott to supervise the construction of the first engines at Stephenson's Newcastle Works who then proceeded to Sydney to organise their erection.

== Operations ==
Locomotive No. 1 arrived by ship on 13 January 1855 and was hauled to a temporary shed on the site of the Eveleigh Railway Workshops. The Locomotive Engineer William Scott supervised assembly and the engine commenced running on 15 May 1855 with ballast trains for railway construction.

Locomotive No. 1 was used for hauling goods and passengers between Sydney, Campbelltown, Richmond and Penrith, and as newer locomotives arrived was confined to goods services to Picton and Penrith. The locomotive was initially fuelled by local timber and later modified to allow the burning of coal.

The first accident involving Locomotive No. 1 was a derailment on 10 July 1858. Two people were killed when a passenger carriage derailed and fell down an embankment near Homebush. On 6 January 1868, a man was killed when Locomotive No. 1 collided with a passenger train at Newtown Station.

Locomotive No. 1 was withdrawn on 15 May 1877, having travelled 156,542 miles (251,930 km).

== Preservation ==
The Museum of Applied Arts and Sciences, later the Powerhouse Museum, approached the Commissioner of Railways to have the locomotive placed in its care. After being rebuilt and repainted, it was presented on 8 May 1884 to the Museum and housed in an annexe of the Agricultural Hall in the Domain. In 1893, it was moved to a special annex built at the Museum's Harris Street site.

Locomotive No. 1 was removed from the Museum and displayed during the 50th Anniversary of NSW Railways in 1905, the NSW Government Railway and Tramway Institute's Great Industrial and Model Exhibition in 1917, the Sesquicentenary of European Settlement in 1938 and finally the Centenary of NSW Railways in 1955.

Following an extensive restoration program, the locomotive featured in the new Powerhouse Museum building opened in 1988. This rebuild disproved speculation that the Locomotive was No. 2, as the majority of parts were stamped with the Makers serial number 958. A small number of other parts were swapped between locomotives per normal repair practice.

== Gallery ==
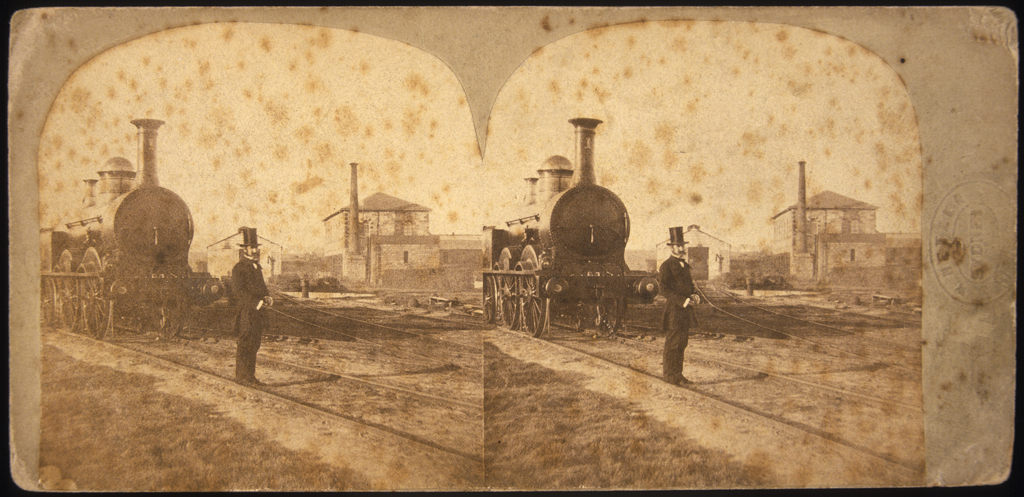
Earliest photographic record

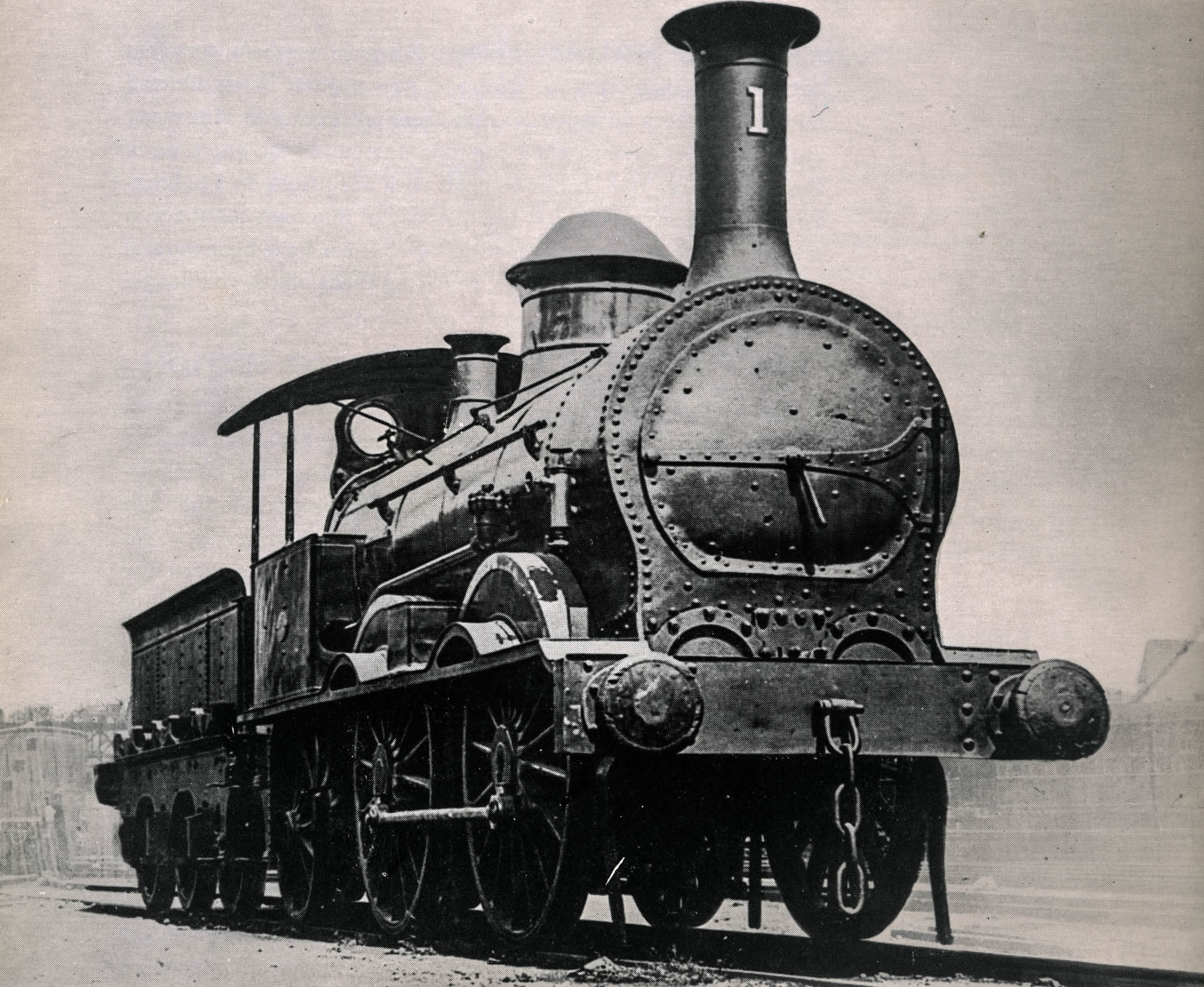
NSWGR 50th Anniversary

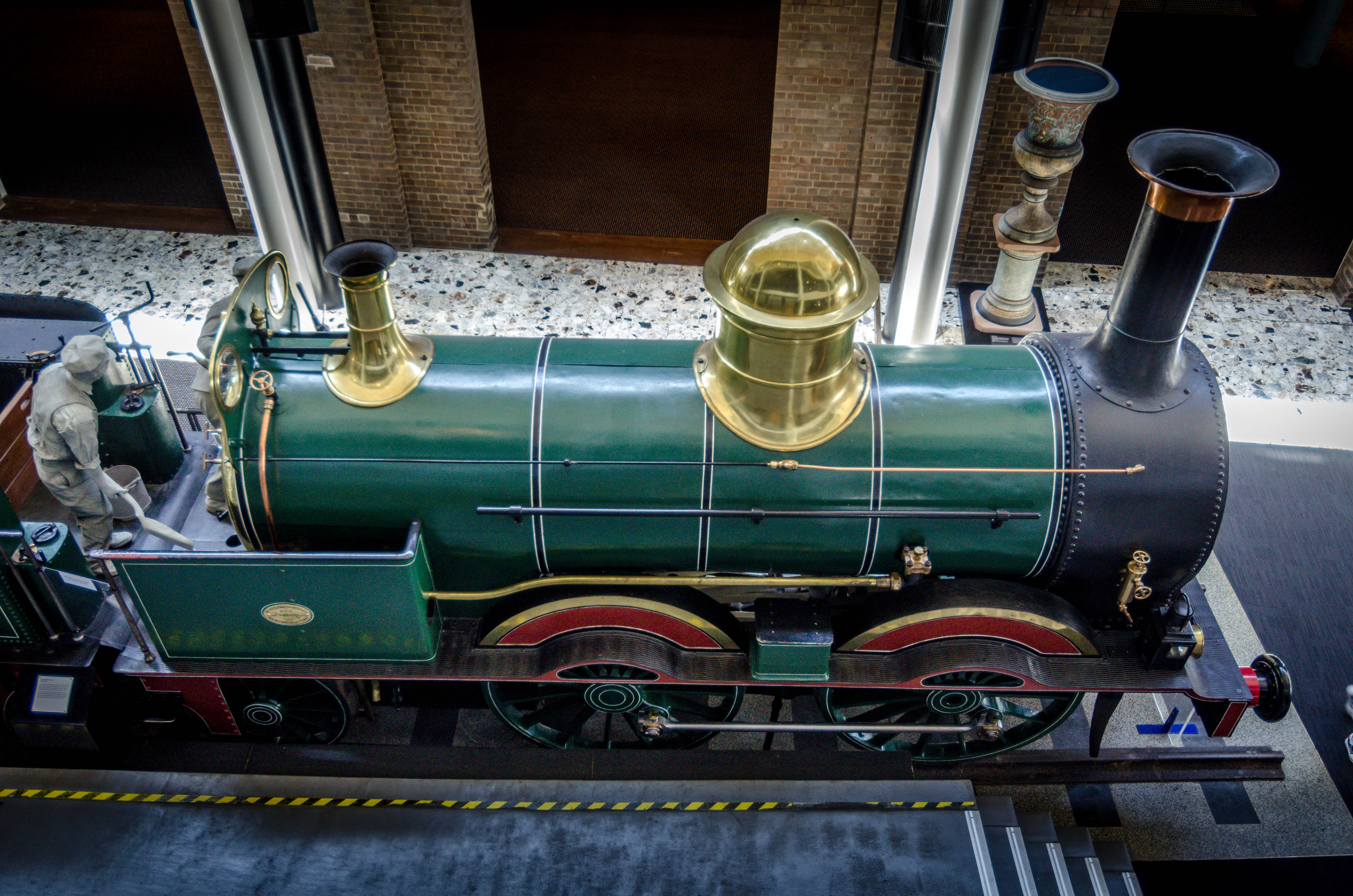
Overhead view

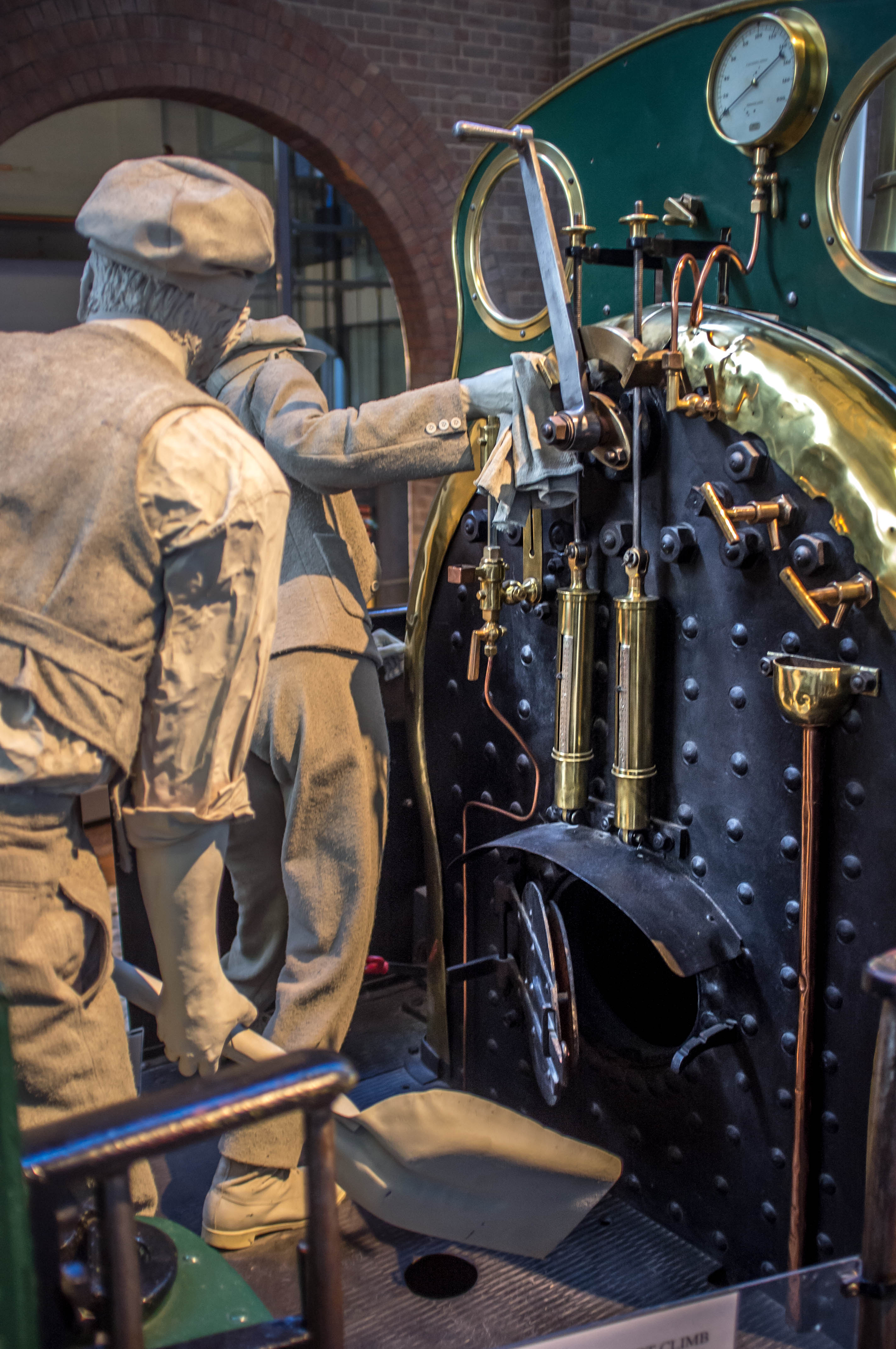
Locomotive Cab View

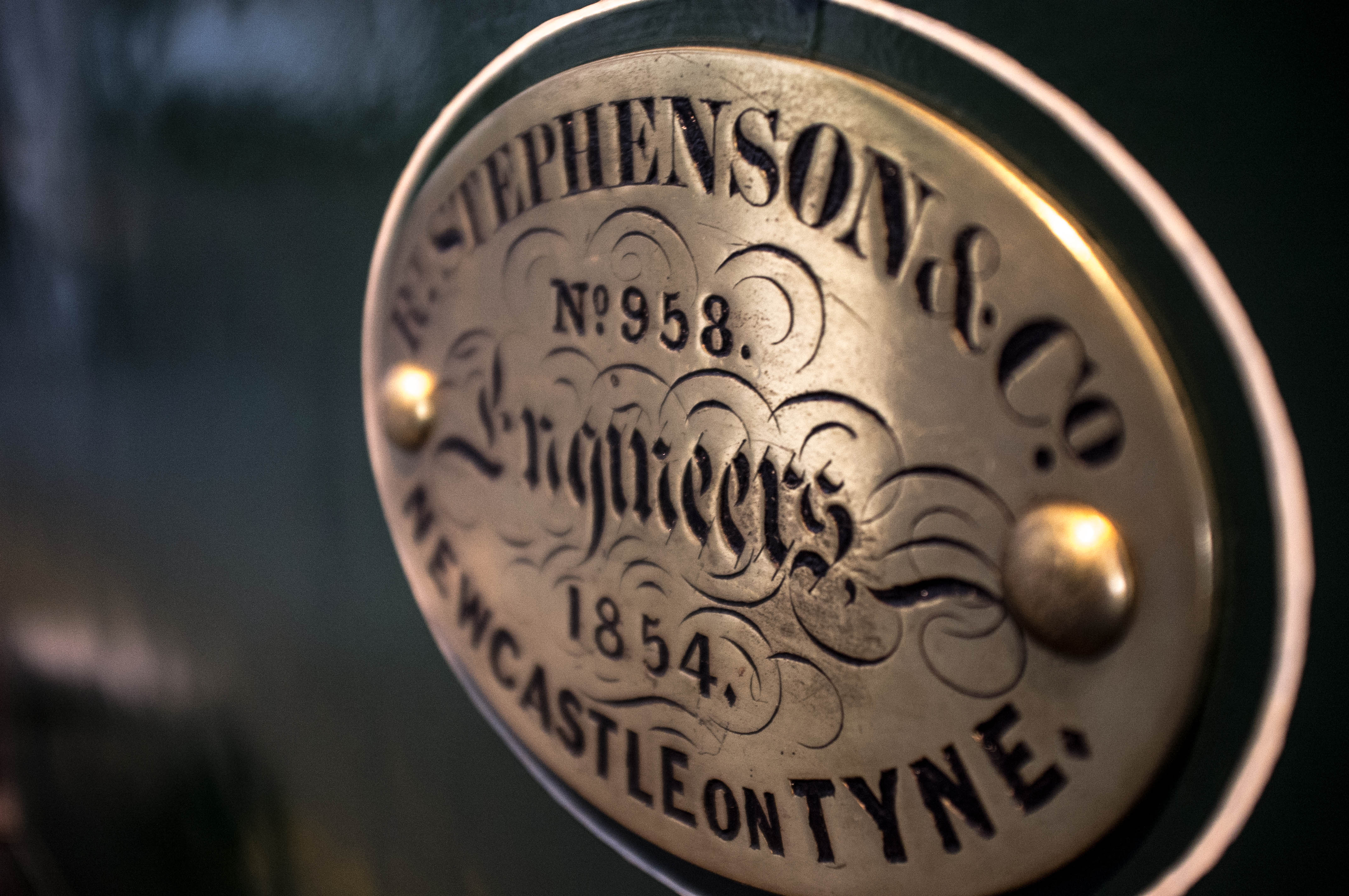
Builder's plate 958

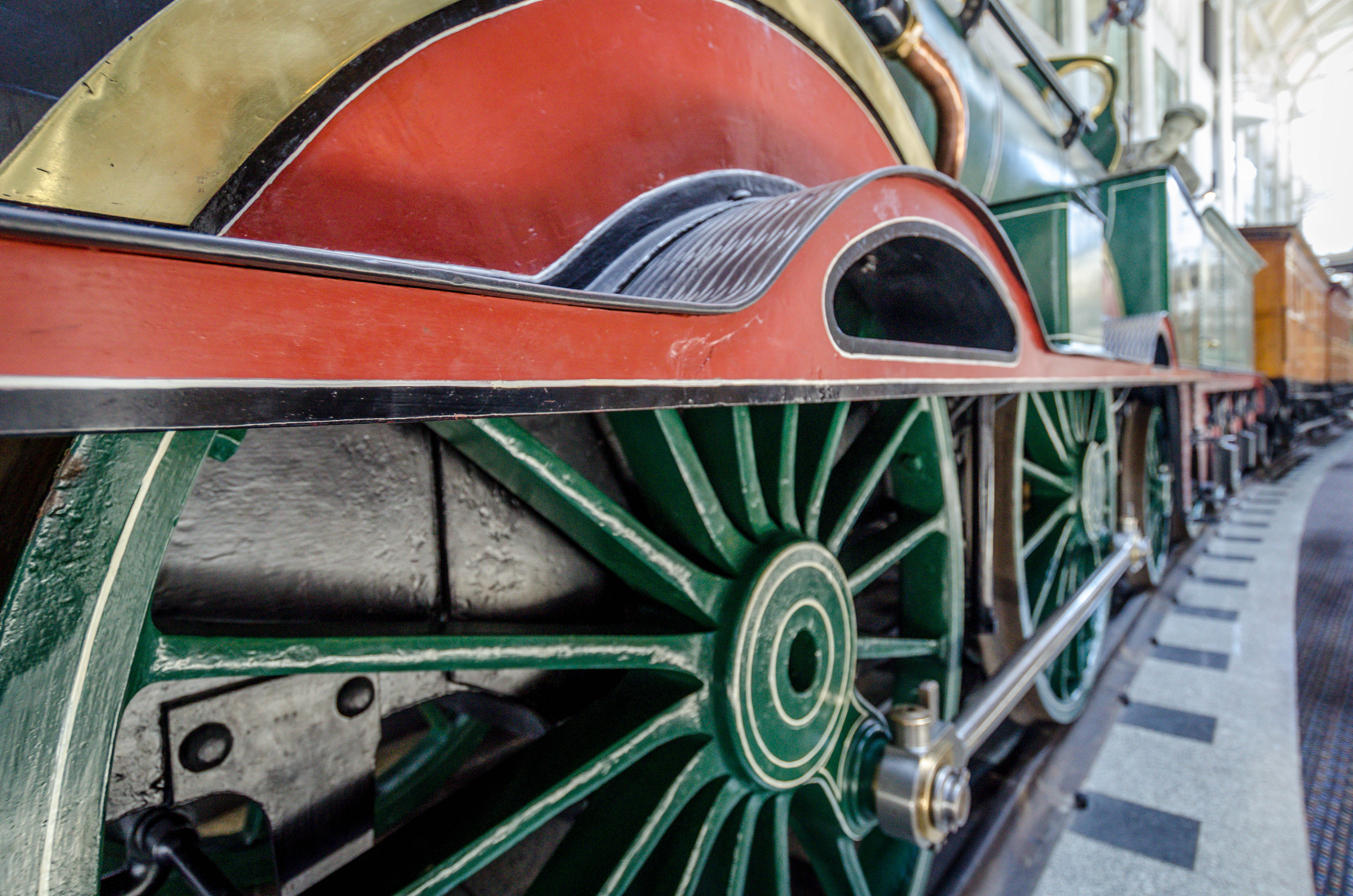
Driving Wheels

Photographs reproduced courtesy of the Powerhouse Museum, Sydney.

== See also ==
- Z1243
- 3265
- 3830
- NSWGR steam locomotive classification
- Preserved steam locomotives of New South Wales
