= New South Wales D53 class locomotive =

Class of Australian 2-8-0 locomotives

New South Wales D53 class
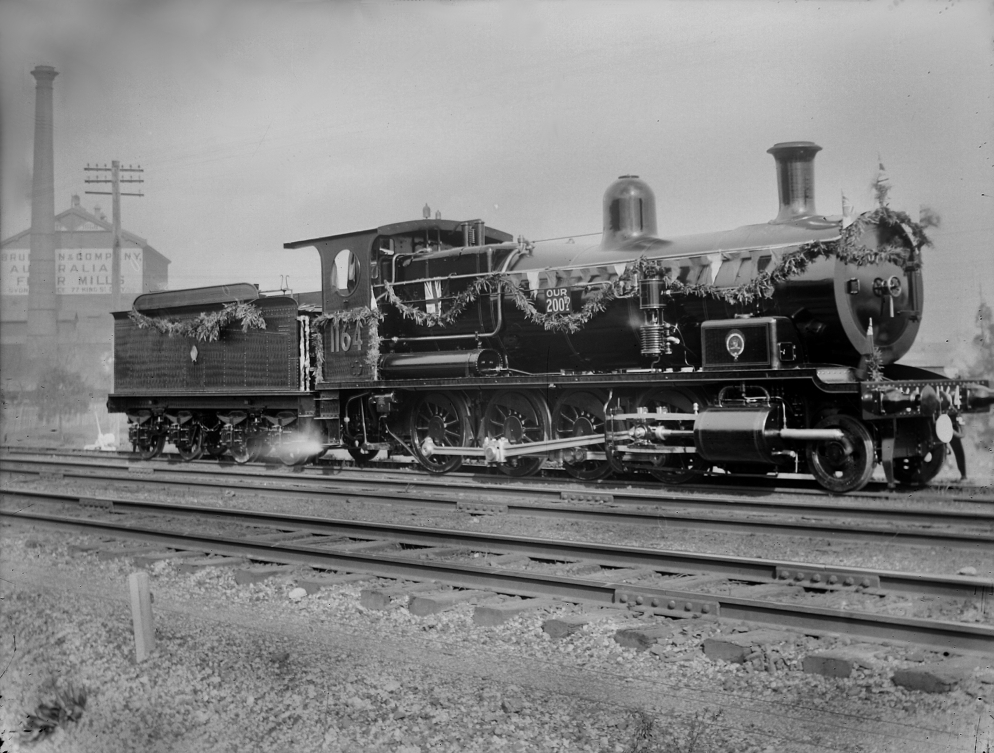
- TF 1164, the 200th steam locomotive built by Clyde Engineering
Type and origin
- Power type: Steam
- Builder: Clyde Engineering (160), Eveleigh Railway Workshops (30)
- Build date: 1912–1917
- Total produced: 190
Specifications
- Configuration
  - Whyte: 2-8-0
  - UIC: 1'Dh
- Gauge: 4 ft 8 1/2 in (1,435 mm) standard gauge
- Driver dia.: 4 ft 3 in (1,295 mm)
- Adhesive weight: 65 t (64 long tons; 72 short tons)
- Loco weight: 72 t (71 long tons; 79 short tons)
- Fuel type: Coal
- Firebox
  - Grate area: 29 sq ft (2.7 m^{2})
- Boiler pressure: 160 psi (1.10 MPa)
- Heating surface: 1,755 sq ft (163.0 m^{2})
- Superheater
  - Heating area: 365 sq ft (33.9 m^{2})
- Cylinders: Two, outside
- Cylinder size: 22 in × 26 in (559 mm × 660 mm)
Performance figures
- Tractive effort: 33,557 lbf (149.3 kN)
- Factor of adh.: 4.46
Career
- Operators: New South Wales Government Railways
- Class: TF939, D53 from 1924
- Disposition: 3 preserved, 187 scrapped

The D53 class is a class of 2-8-0 steam locomotives built for the New South Wales Government Railways of Australia.

== History ==
This class of locomotive was designed by the New South Wales Government Railways as an improved version of the T class. All the coupled wheels had flanges and a certain amount of side movement was given to the middle pairs with a laterally operating knuckle joint being provided in the middle section of the coupling rods.

Clyde Engineering delivered the first locomotive in April 1912 and by November 1917, a total of 190 were in service. Most were fitted with superheaters when built and some fitted at a later date. There was a problem with the locomotives being unbalanced, causing speed restrictions to be imposed to avoid rough riding and track damage. Following further investigations, 24 of the class received balanced coupled wheels and these were permitted to operate at higher speed on mail and fruit trains.

When introduced, most of the class were fitted with a standard bogie tender, similar to those attached to the 50 class, although some saw service with large capacity "Wampu" tenders. In the later period of their lives, the majority were fitted with larger turret type tenders. In later years some were used as heavy shunting locomotives and from 1963 on some of these had automatic couplers fitted to the front.

Following the removal of the knuckle joints from the coupling rods, flanges from the second coupled and driving wheels and the fitting of boilers standard for 50 class; 53 class and 55 class, they became most useful locomotives.

The 24 not fitted with superheaters were scrapped in the 1930s. The first superheated example was withdrawn in January 1957 with the fleet down to 39 by July 1969 with the last withdrawn in January 1973.

The Commonwealth Railways used the design of these locomotives for their 26 strong KA class for the Trans-Australian Railway.

== Preservation ==
Three have been preserved:

Preserved D53 class locomotives
Number	Builder	Year	Owner	Location	Status	References/notes
5353	NSWGR	1913	Dorrigo Steam Railway and Museum	Dorrigo	Stored	
5367	Clyde Engineering	1914	Lachlan Valley Railway	Cowra	Under overhaul	
5461	Clyde Engineering	1916	Transport Heritage NSW	Valley Heights	Static Display	

Locomotive 5461 is fitted with the last "Wampu" style tender and was known as 1174 in the pre-1924 numbering scheme. 1174 was known to be an exceptionally bad steamer and was the subject of many poems.

== See also ==
- NSWGR steam locomotive classification
