= New South Wales C30T class locomotive =

Class of Australian 4-6-0 locomotives

New South Wales C30T class
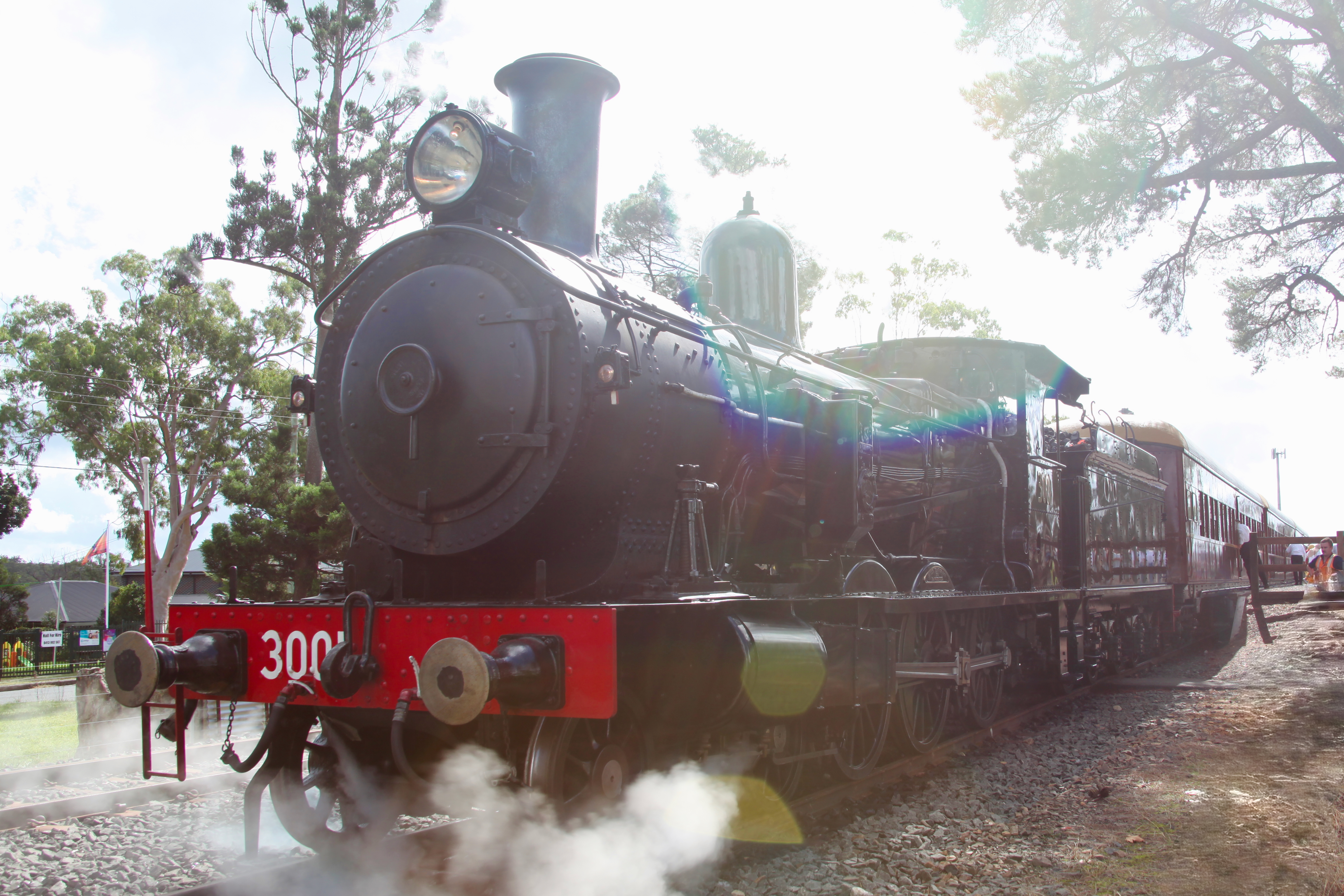
- 3001 at the Buxton, New South Wales, near the NSW Rail Museum, Thirlmere
Type and origin
- Power type: Steam
- Builder: Beyer, Peacock & Company; Eveleigh Railway Workshops
- Build date: 1903–1917
- Rebuilder: Clyde Engineering (10); Eveleigh Railway Workshops (67)
- Rebuild date: 1928–1933
- Number rebuilt: 77
Specifications
- Configuration
  - Whyte: 4-6-0
  - UIC: 2'Ch
- Gauge: 1,435 mm (4 ft 8 1/2 in) standard gauge
- Driver dia.: 4 ft 7 in (1,397 mm)
- Adhesive weight: 88,000 lb (39,916 kg; 40 t)
- Loco weight: 121,000 lb (54,885 kg; 55 t)
- Fuel type: Coal
- Firebox
  - Grate area: 24 sq ft (2.2 m^{2})
- Boiler pressure: 160 psi (1.10 MPa)
- Heating surface: 1,110 sq ft (103 m^{2})
- Superheater
  - Heating area: 280 sq ft (26 m^{2})
- Cylinders: Two, outside
- Cylinder size: 19 in × 24 in (483 mm × 610 mm)
Performance figures
- Tractive effort: 21,424 lbf (95.3 kN)
- Factor of adh.: 4.11
Career
- Operators: New South Wales Government Railways
- Class: C30T
- Retired: December 1958 – August 1972
- Preserved: 3016, 3026, 3028, 3075, 3090, 3102
- Disposition: 6 preserved, 71 scrapped

The C30T class is a class of steam locomotives rebuilt from 30 class tank engines by Clyde Engineering and Eveleigh Railway Workshops for the New South Wales Government Railways of Australia.

== History ==
Following the electrification of the Sydney inner suburban lines from 1926, 77 of the 30 class 4-6-4 tank locomotives were converted to tender type. This was achieved by cutting off the frames at the rear of the cab and removing the side tanks. There was no need to build tenders as there were a number on hand from scrapped locomotives or from locomotives where the original tenders had been replaced, notably 50 class locomotives.

The first locomotive to be converted was Engine No. 3088 which was delivered by Clyde Engineering on 22 August 1928. This company delivered a total of 10 conversions of these engines, the remainder being carried out at the New South Wales Government Railways' Eveleigh Railway Workshops. All of the engines were completed by July 1933. On conversion, the suffix 'T' was added to their numbers, on official correspondence only. The numbers were not altered on the locomotives.

Between September 1940 to April 1957, 28 engines were fitted with superheaters. This work included fitting new cylinders with piston valves and extended smokeboxes. Most of the 28 superheated C30Ts received riveted on 'drumhead' extensions to their smokeboxes. Some engines were given entirely new extended smokeboxes fully supported by the frames, giving these few a more modern, purposeful look. Superheated locomotives had the further suffix 'S' to their numbers, on official correspondence only.

In their heyday, they could be found working almost every light branch line in New South Wales. Even in the final years of steam power, they could still be found well spread over the state in such places as Temora, Griffith, Cowra, Dubbo and Narrabri West.

The first was withdrawn in December 1958 (3126T) with the last (3090TS) withdrawn in August 1972. Seven engines of the class survive into preservation.

== Preservation ==
Preserved C30T class locomotives
No.	Manufacturer	Year	Organisation	Location	Status	Ref
3001TS	Beyer, Peacock & Company	1903	Transport Heritage NSW	Thirlmere	Operational, returned to service in March 2023	
3016TS	Beyer, Peacock & Company	1903	Canberra Railway Museum	Canberra	Under overhaul	
3026T	Beyer, Peacock & Company	1903	Lachlan Valley Railway	Cowra	Stored	
3028T	Beyer, Peacock & Company	1904	Dorrigo Steam Railway & Museum	Dorrigo	Stored	Saturated
3075TS	Eveleigh Railway Workshops	1912	Parkes Apex Club	Kelly Reserve, Parkes	Plinthed	
3090TS	Eveleigh Railway Workshops	1912	Dorrigo Steam Railway & Museum	Dorrigo	Stored	
3102T	Beyer, Peacock & Company	1912	Private owner	Canberra	Stored, withdrawn April 1986	
