= New South Wales C30 class locomotive =

Class of Australian 4-6-4T locomotives

New South Wales C30 class
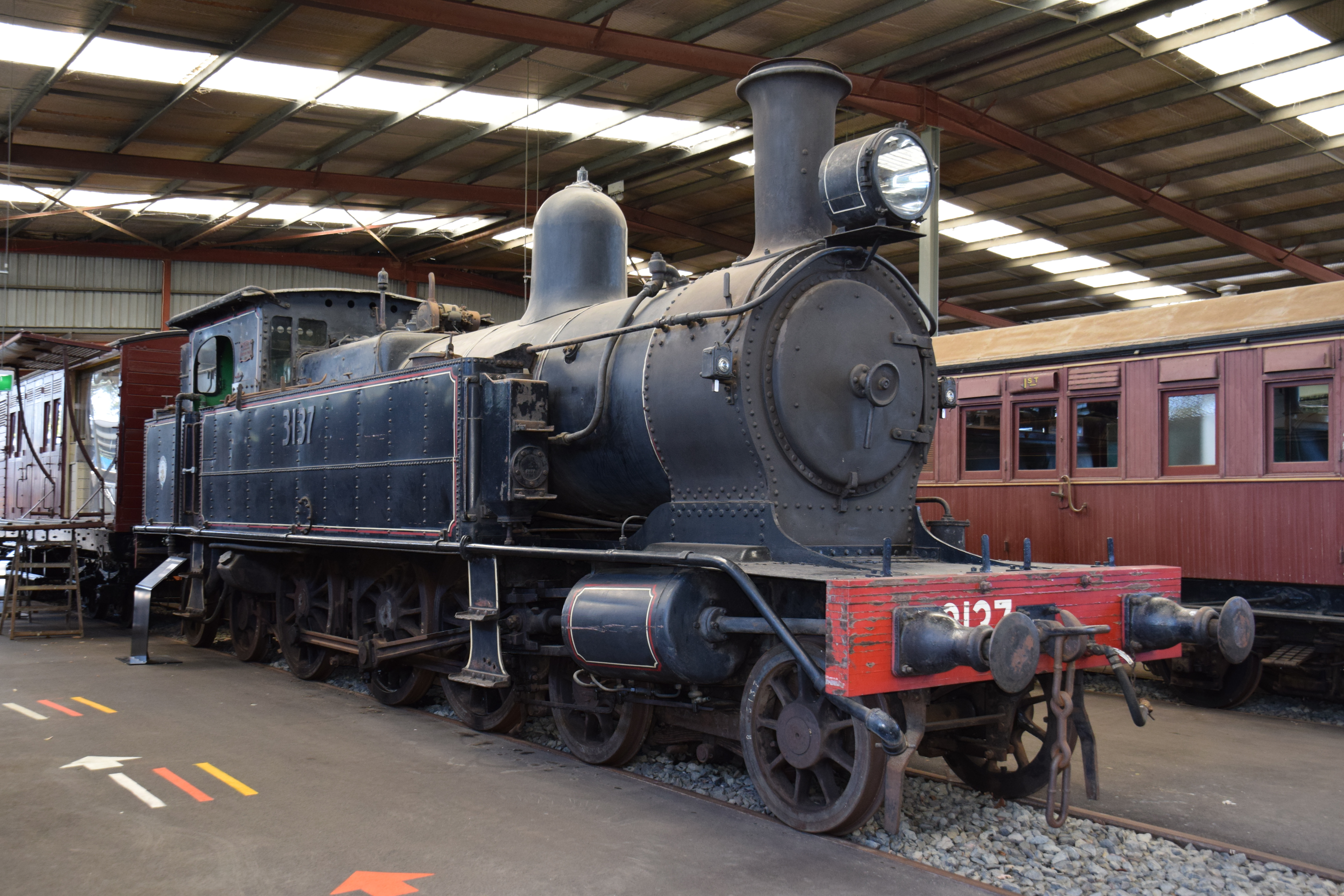
- 3137 at the NSW Rail Museum, Thirlmere
Type and origin
- Power type: Steam
- Builder: Beyer, Peacock & Company (95); Eveleigh Railway Workshops (50)
- Serial number: BP 4444–4478, 5034–5038, 5084–5088, 5140–5149, 5235–5244, 5791–5820
- Build date: 1903–1917
- Total produced: 145
Specifications
- Configuration
  - Whyte: 4-6-4T
  - UIC: 2'C2'nt
- Gauge: 1,435 mm (4 ft 8 1/2 in) standard gauge
- Driver dia.: 4 ft 7 in (1,397 mm)
- Adhesive weight: 86,000–95,000 lb (39,009–43,091 kg; 39–43 t)
- Loco weight: 161,000 lb (73,028 kg; 73 t)
- Fuel type: Coal
- Firebox
  - Grate area: 24 sq ft (2.2 m^{2})
- Boiler pressure: 160 psi (1.10 MPa)
- Heating surface: 1,450 sq ft (135 m^{2})
- Superheater: None
- Cylinders: Two, outside
- Cylinder size: 18.5 in × 24 in (470 mm × 610 mm) or 19 in × 24 in (483 mm × 610 mm)
Performance figures
- Tractive effort: 20,311–21,424 lbf (90.3–95.3 kN)
- Factor of adh.: 4.22 or 4.42
Career
- Operators: New South Wales Government Railways
- Class: S636, C30 from 1924
- Retired: 1957–1973
- Preserved: 3013, 3046, 3085, 3112, 3137
- Disposition: 77 converted to C30T class, 5 preserved, 63 scrapped

The C30 class (formerly S.636 class) is a class of steam locomotives built by Beyer, Peacock & Company and Eveleigh Railway Workshops for the New South Wales Government Railways (NSWGR) of Australia.

These 4-6-4 tank locomotives were specifically designed to haul Sydney's ever increasing suburban traffic, particularly over the heavy grades on the Northern, North Shore and Illawarra lines.

== Service ==
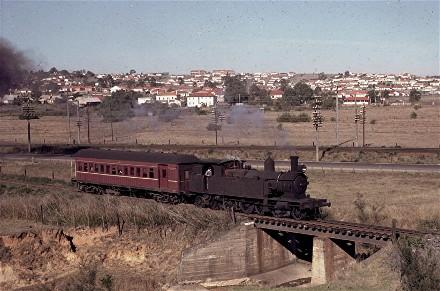
Class 30 locomotive on a service to Camden in 1962

The Beyer, Peacock & Company built the first batch of 35 which entered service in 1903/04. Subsequently, between 1905 and 1917, Beyer, Peacock built an additional 60 while the Eveleigh Railway Workshops of the NSWGR built 50 more (3066–3095, 3126–3145).

The inner-city lines' electrification made the locomotives obsolete, but they were too valuable to be withdrawn and scrapped at the time. Therefore, from August 1928 to July 1933, Clyde Engineering and Eveleigh Railway Workshops converted 77 of these locomotives to C30T class 4-6-0 tender locomotives to replace older locomotives on country branch lines.

The remaining unaltered locomotives were primarily utilized on Sydney suburban services to Cowan, Penrith, and Campbelltown, as well as branches to Carlingford, Richmond, and Camden. They were also employed on the suburban services in Newcastle and Wollongong.

A few drifted to the country areas, working on sections where no turntable was readily available, such as Casino to Border Loop on the North Coast line, Leeton and Merriwa, and shunting at yards such as Bathurst. Until February 1967, these locomotives operated the daily passenger trains on extremely steep Unanderra to Moss Vale line. Locomotive 3042 was used to haul work trains as part of the electrification of Campbelltown and Glenlee in 1968.

Following the electrification of the country platforms at Sydney Central station, the 30 class replaced the 26 class locomotives used to shunt carriages in the yard; being not as hazardous to water under the traction wiring.

== Demise and preservation ==
The first example was retired in February 1957, and the engine fleet gradually reduced to 33 by July 1965, and further down to only 3 by mid-1971. Finally, the last engine, No. 3085, was taken out of service on 22 February 1973, making it the second-last steam locomotive to remain in operation on the NSWGR.

Preserved C30 class locomotives
No.	Manufacturer	Year	Organisation	Location	Status	Image	Ref
3013	Beyer, Peacock & Company	1903	Canberra Railway Museum	Canberra	Stored dismantled		
3046	Beyer, Peacock & Company	1908	Dorrigo Steam Railway & Museum	Dorrigo	Stored		
3085	Eveleigh Railway Workshops	1912	Transport Heritage NSW	Oberon	Static exhibit		
3112	Beyer, Peacock & Company	1914	The Picnic Train	Goulburn	Under overhaul		
3137	Eveleigh Railway Workshops	1916	Transport Heritage NSW	Thirlmere	Static exhibit		
