= New South Wales Z25 class locomotive =

Class of Australian 2-6-0 locomotives

New South Wales Z25 class
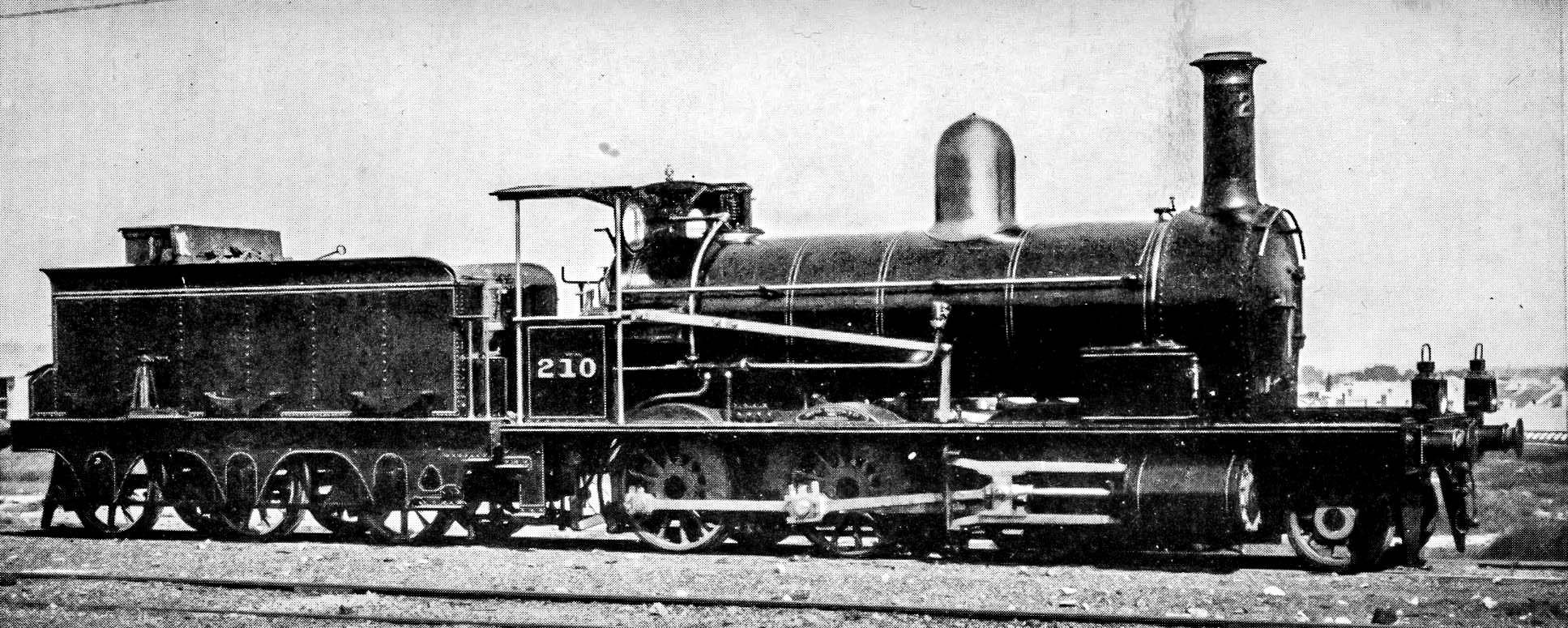
Type and origin
- Power type: Steam
- Builder: Beyer, Peacock & Company
- Serial number: 2073–2092, 2308–2337, 2547–2565
- Build date: 1881–1885
- Total produced: 70
Specifications
- Configuration
  - Whyte: 2-6-0
- Gauge: 1,435 mm (4 ft 8 1/2 in) standard gauge
- Driver dia.: 4 ft 0 in (1,219 mm)
- Adhesive weight: 77,000 lb (34,927 kg)
- Loco weight: 95,000 lb (43,091 kg)
- Fuel type: Coal
- Firebox
  - Grate area: 21 sq ft (2.0 m^{2})
- Boiler pressure: 140 psi (0.965 MPa)
- Heating surface: 1,145 sq ft (106.4 m^{2})
- Cylinders: 2 outside
- Cylinder size: 18.5 in × 26 in (470 mm × 660 mm)
Performance figures
- Tractive effort: 22,060 lbf (98.1 kN)
- Factor of adh.: 3.49
Career
- Operators: New South Wales Government Railways
- Class: B205, Z25 from 1924
- Numbers: 2As built: 05-254, 314-333; From 1924: 2501-2570
- Preserved: 2510, 2535
- Disposition: 2 preserved, 68 scrapped

The New South Wales Z25 class is a class of 2-6-0 steam locomotives operated by the New South Wales Government Railways of Australia.

== Design ==
In the late 1870s, only 11 of the 82 goods locomotives in service on the Southern and Western lines of the New South Wales Government Railways had a leading truck. The balance had a wheel arrangement of 0-6-0. To provide a more suitable locomotive for use over the 8 chain (161 m) radius curves of the Blue Mountains line, it was decided to incorporate a Bissell pony truck on an improved version of the A93 class, previously known as B class.

Beyer, Peacock & Company prepared a design which was considered to be in advance of British contemporary practice. The first twenty 205 class entered service in 1882.

== In service ==
The new engines were found to be more sluggish than the 93 class when getting away with a load, but pulled decidedly better when running tender first. Following tests on the Blue Mountains, Commissioner Goodchap recommended the installation of 50 ft. (15.25 m) turntables at Sydney, Bathurst and Goulburn which were required to turn the new locomotives. Four were allocated to the then isolated Northern network.

At that time, there were thirty 93 class locomotives on order. As Locomotive Engineer W. Scott considered the new 205 class better suited to his requirements, the order was amended to thirty 205 class locomotives, but with some minor improvements. These entered service in 1883/84, eight being allocated to Northern network.

Both batches were found to be prone to slipping and an increase of driving axle load was deemed to be necessary.

A further 20 arrived in 1885, five of which going to the Northern system. This last batch had cabs with steel cutaway sides, an improvement on the open cabs of the earlier batches.

In the late 1880s, the class were based at Sydney, Goulburn, Penrith, Bathurst, Newcastle, Murrurundi and Armidale.

From February 1901, all of the class were fitted with larger Belpaire boilers which increased their weight and also increased the heating surface, matters identified as deficient in William Thow' report of 1889. At the same time, wooden cabs replaced the open cabs of the earlier batches.

With the arrival of the T524 class locomotives in 1896, main line work began to be assigned to these newer classes and the 205 class were relegated to lighter branch lines. In 1923, 2531 and 2534 were fitted with superheaters after accidents. As part of the 1924 reclassification scheme, all 70 were reclassified as the Z25 class and renumbered 2501 to 2570.

During the years of the Great Depression, many of these locomotives fell into derelict condition after becoming due for overhaul. Some were used during the load testing of the Sydney Harbour Bridge in 1932.

Two identical locomotives were built for the Midland & South Western Junction Railway, England in 1895 and 1897.

== Preservation ==
Two have been preserved:

- 2510 by the NSW Rail Museum, Thirlmere, cosmetically restored at Macdonaldtown Carriage Sheds in the 1980s
- 2535 by the Dorrigo Steam Railway & Museum, Dorrigo
