= Dorrigo Steam Railway and Museum =

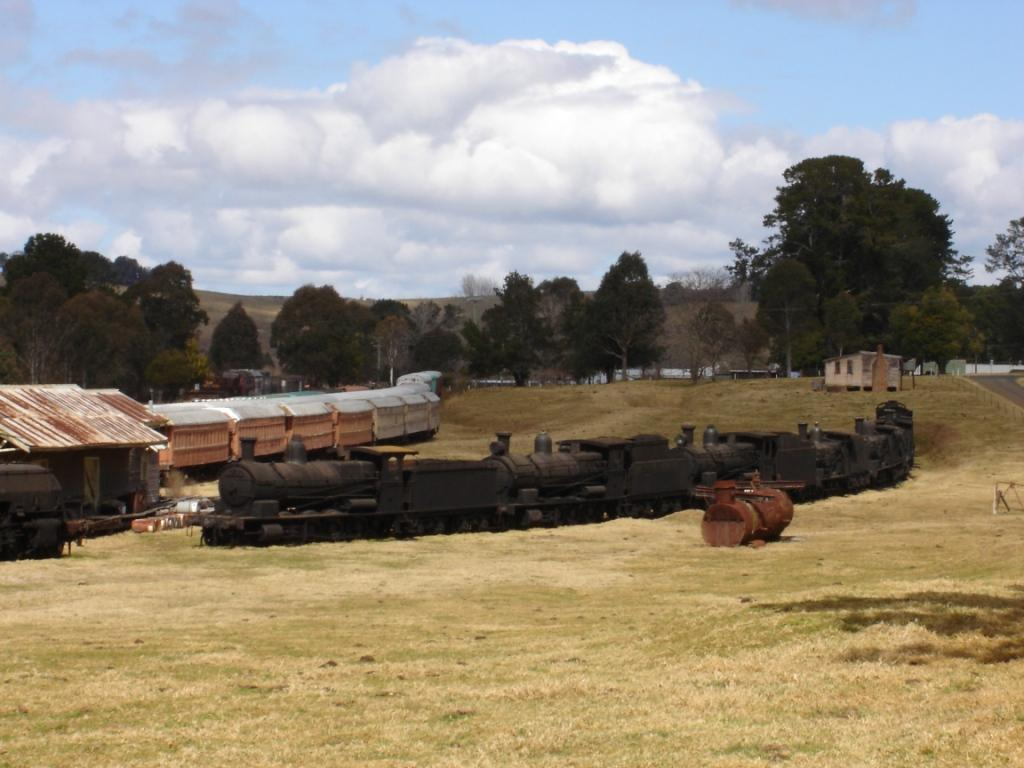
- Engines and carriages stored at the Dorrigo Steam Railway & Museum in August 2005
- Former name: Hunter Valley Steam Railway & Museum
- Established: 1973
- Location: Dorrigo
- Coordinates: 30.3331°S 152.7063°E
- Type: Railway museum
- Website: www.dsrm.org.au

The Dorrigo Steam Railway and Museum in Dorrigo, New South Wales, Australia is a large, privately owned collection of railway vehicles and equipment from the railways of New South Wales, covering both Government and private railways. The collection dates from 1878 until 1985.

== Status ==
The museum was opened very briefly in 1986, but has been described as "not yet open to the public" ever since.

== History ==
The museum's origins stem from the formation of the Hunter Valley Steam Railway & Museum in 1973 which was formed following the closure of the Glenreagh to Dorrigo branch line the previous year with the aim of restoring the 69 kilometres (43 mi) as a tourist railway. Much of the rolling stock was stored at the former Rhondda Colliery, three kilometres (1.9 mi) from Cockle Creek while the line was repaired. It was renamed the Dorrigo Steam Railway & Museum in 1982.

On 20 December 1984, the section from Glenreagh to Lowanna was reopened with 5069 hauling the first train. On 5 April 1986 the line was opened through to Dorrigo, with a steam hauled service hauled by 3028 and 5069, operating the first service over the final 13 kilometres (8.1 mi) from Megan through to the terminus with 300 members on board. At this stage the line still needed further work before trains could operate on it regularly. This was completed in October 1986.

However, before operations could begin, a faction within the museum's membership commenced legal action over the ownership of the collection and the line fell back into a state of disrepair. The dispute was finally resolved in February 1999 with the Glenreagh to Ulong section of the line sold to the Glenreagh Mountain Railway and the Ulong to Dorrigo section sold to the Dorrigo Steam Railway & Museum. By 2017, it had the largest private collection in the southern hemisphere with 75 locomotives, 19 railmotors and 280 carriages and wagons.

== Preservation ==
Ex-NSWGR Steam Locomotives
No.	Description	Manufacturer	Year	Location	Status	Ref
1904	0-6-0 passenger	Beyer, Peacock & Company	1877	Dorrigo	stored
2414	2-6-0 goods	Dübs & Company	1891	Dorrigo	stored
2535	2-6-0 passenger	Beyer, Peacock & Company	1883	Dorrigo	stored
3028	4-6-0 mixed traffic	Beyer, Peacock & Company	1904	Dorrigo	stored
3046	4-6-4T passenger	Beyer, Peacock & Company	1908	Dorrigo	stored
3813	4-6-2 express passenger	Cardiff Locomotive Workshops	1946	Dorrigo	parts only
5069	2-8-0 passenger	Beyer, Peacock & Company	1903	Dorrigo	stored
5132	2-8-0 goods	Clyde Engineering	1909	Dorrigo	stored
5353	2-8-0 goods	Clyde Engineering	1913	Dorrigo	stored
ROD 20	2-8-0	North British Locomotive Company	1918	Dorrigo	static display
ROD 24	2-8-0	Gorton Locomotive Works	1918	Dorrigo	static display
5920	2-8-2 goods	Baldwin Locomotive Works	1953	Dorrigo	stored
6039	4-8-4+4-8-4 goods	Beyer, Peacock & Company	1956	Dorrigo	stored
6042	4-8-4+4-8-4 goods	Beyer, Peacock & Company	1956	Forbes	stored

Ex-Private Steam Locomotives
No.	Description	Manufacturer	Year	In service Railway	Location	Status	Ref
Juno	0-4-0ST	Andrew Barclay Sons & Co	1923	Commonwealth Steel Co	Dorrigo	stored
Bristol Bomber	0-6-0ST	Avonside Engine Company	1922	J & A Brown	Dorrigo	stored
3	0-6-0ST	Kitson & Company	1878	J & A Brown	Dorrigo	stored
3	0-6-0T	Andrew Barclay Sons & Co	1911	Blue Circle Southern Cement	Dorrigo	stored
4	0-4-0T	HK Porter	1915	Commonwealth Steel Co	Dorrigo	stored
5	0-6-0T	Andrew Barclay Sons & Co	1916	Blue Circle Southern Cement	Dorrigo	stored
Corby	0-4-0ST	Peckett & Sons	1943	Tubemakers of Australia	Dorrigo	stored
Marian	0-4-0ST	Andrew Barclay Sons & Co	1948	John Lysaght	Dorrigo	stored
Badger	0-6-0ST	Australian Iron & Steel	1943	Australian Iron & Steel	Dorrigo	stored
SMR 14	0-8-2T	Avonside Engine Company	1909	South Maitland Railway	Dorrigo	stored
N/A	0-4-0	Appleby	1900	Hexham Engineering	Dorrigo	stored
SMR 17	2-8-2T	Beyer, Peacock & Company	1915	South Maitland Railways	Dorrigo	stored
SMR 20	2-8-2T	Beyer, Peacock & Company	1915	South Maitland Railways	Dorrigo	stored
SMR 23	2-8-2T	Beyer, Peacock & Company	1915	South Maitland Railways	Dorrigo	stored
SMR 26	2-8-2T	Beyer, Peacock & Company	1915	South Maitland Railways	Dorrigo	stored
SMR 27	2-8-2T	Beyer, Peacock & Company	1915	South Maitland Railways	Dorrigo	stored
SMR 28	2-8-2T	Beyer, Peacock & Company	1915	South Maitland Railways	Dorrigo	stored
SMR 31	2-8-2T	Beyer, Peacock & Company	1915	South Maitland Railways	Dorrigo	stored

=== Other locomotives ===
- 42 class diesel locomotive 4206
- 421 class diesel locomotive 42102
- 44 class diesel locomotive 4420
- 45 class diesel locomotive 4521
- 46 class electric locomotive 4602
- 47 class diesel locomotive 4706
- 48 class diesel locomotive 4822
- 49 class diesel locomotive 4918
- 70 class diesel hydraulic locomotive 7007, 7008, 7010
- 73 class diesel hydraulic locomotive 7329, 7335
- 85 class electric locomotive 8507
- 86 class electric locomotive 8601, 8650
- BHP D9 class diesel locomotive D11

==== Electric Multiple Units ====
- U set Motor car CF5004
- U set Motor car CF5024
- Standard Motor car C3167
- Tulloch double deck trailer T4840
