= New South Wales Z26 class locomotive =

Class of Australian 2-6-2T locomotives

New South Wales Z26 class
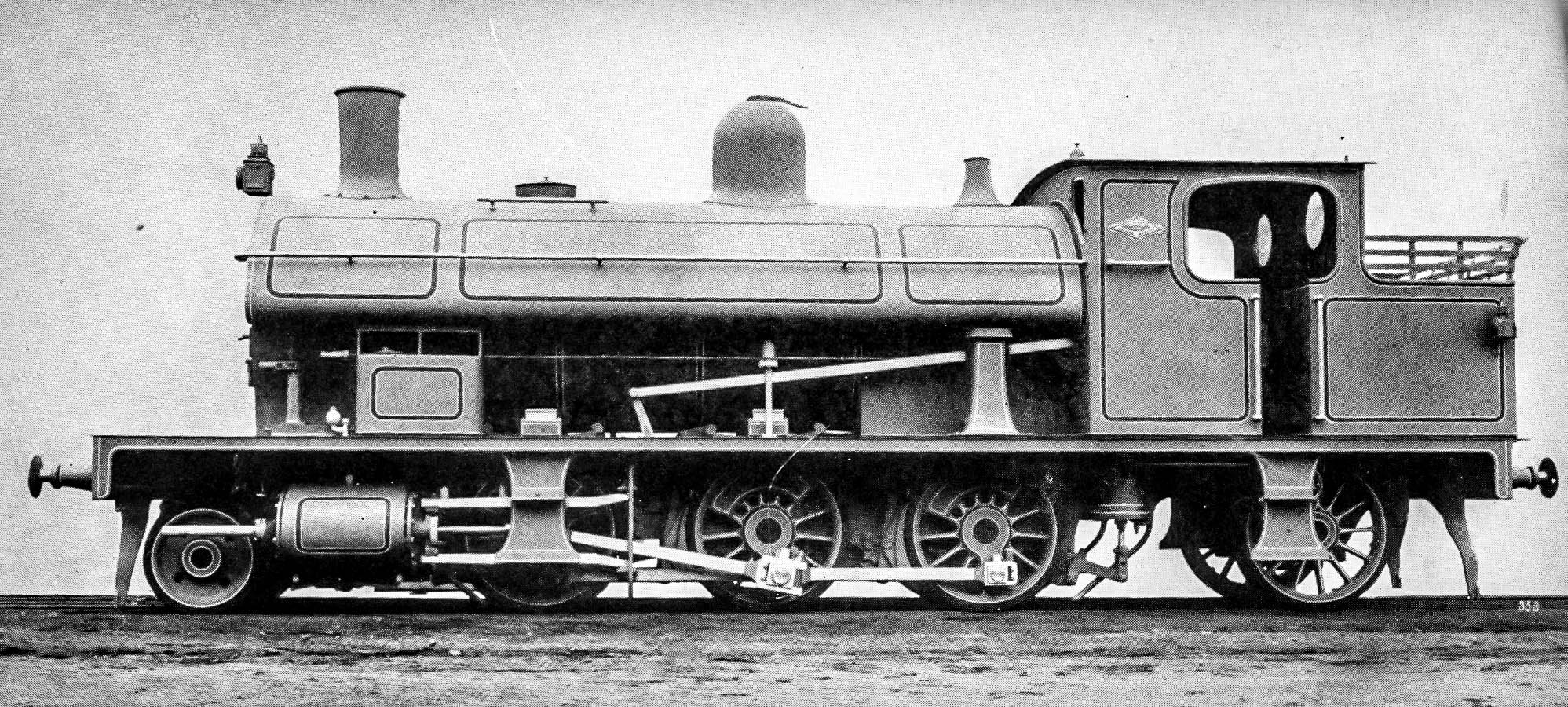
- Class Z26 locomotive
Type and origin
- Power type: Steam
- Builder: Dübs & Company
- Total produced: 20
Specifications
- Configuration
  - Whyte: 2-6-2ST
  - UIC: 1'C1' n2t
- Gauge: 4 ft 8 1/2 in (1,435 mm) standard gauge
- Driver dia.: 4 ft 0 in (1,219 mm)
- Adhesive weight: 88,000 lb (39,916 kg; 40 t)
- Loco weight: 146,000 lb (66,224 kg; 66 t)
- Fuel type: Coal
- Firebox
  - Grate area: 21 sq ft (2.0 m^{2})
- Boiler pressure: 150 psi (1.03 MPa)
- Heating surface: 1,345 sq ft (125.0 m^{2})
- Superheater: None
- Cylinders: Two, outside
- Cylinder size: 18 in × 26 in (457 mm × 660 mm)
Performance figures
- Tractive effort: 22,380 lbf (99.6 kN)
- Factor of adh.: 3.49
Career
- Operators: New South Wales Government Railways
- Class: I17, Z26 from 1924
- Numbers: 17-22, 103, 127-129, 292, 293, 391, 394, 397-402 (2601–2620 from 1924)
- Disposition: 2 preserved, 18 scrapped

The 26 class (formerly I.17 class) is a class of steam locomotives built by Dübs & Company for the New South Wales Government Railways of Australia.

== History ==
Dübs & Company were contracted to supply 20 large mineral tank locomotives, the design of which included the fitting of a Webb radial axle at the bunker end. The locomotives were delivered in the early months of 1892.

Originally intended for assisting freight trains over the Blue Mountains line, they were found unsatisfactory due to insufficient water capacity and inflexibility around tight curves. Several were sent to Waterfall for working coal and blue metal trains. Shunting at Darling Harbour and Alexandria goods yards was the duty of the remainder of those based in Sydney. Others were stationed at the old Hamilton locomotive depot for working trains from the interchange with the South Maitland Railway at East Greta to Newcastle.

Although replaced in 1905 by larger locomotives between Waterfall and Sydney, they continued to haul coal hopper wagons to Waterfall and, additionally were used to assist northbound trains through Otford Tunnel. At holiday times, some of these locomotives were transferred to working picnic trains to The National Park.

During the 1920s, most of the class was withdrawn. After several years out of use, were returned to traffic as shunters, particularly at western centres such as Lithgow, Bathurst and Orange. Several were sent to Albury to assist at this busy break-of-gauge station and others to Port Kembla.

From 1942 until 1956, two of the class were engaged in shunting carriages at Sydney Central station. They were removed when overhead wiring was installed as using the water columns was a hazard owing to the location of the inlet.

The first was withdrawn in September 1956 with only nine remaining by 1961. The final two representatives of the class in service were 2604 and 2606, which were to be found at Bathurst until 1970.

After its withdrawal from government service in July 1964, 2605 was purchased by the Blue Circle Southern Cement Company on 26 October 1966, for industrial use at the cement works in Portland, where it served there until 1983.

== Preservation ==
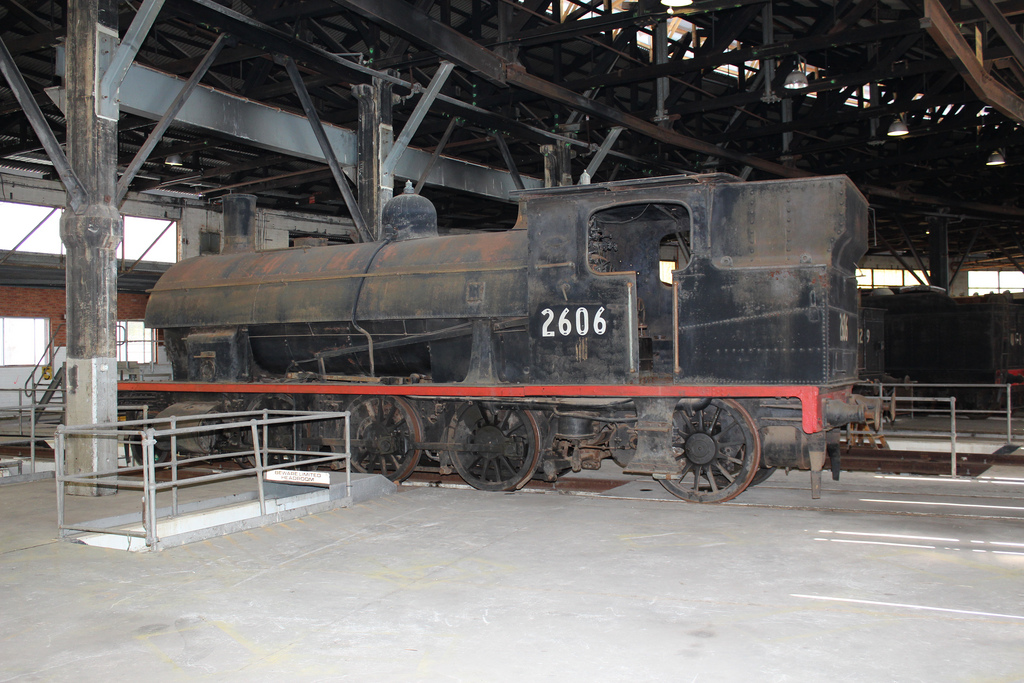
2606 in storage at Broadmeadow in 2012, before being relocated to Chullora in 2024.

After its retirement from industrial service, 2605 was placed in store at Lithgow, later becoming one of the first exhibits of the Lithgow State Mine Museum in 1990, where it was restored to operation. In October 2001, 2605 was damaged in a shed fire that also destroyed several carriages. It was then cosmetically restored for static display, but since then, it is under operational restoration as of 2016.

2606 was set aside for preservation as a representative of its class at the NSW Rail Transport Museum in Enfield, before the museum's relocation to its present location at Thirlmere in 1975. There, 2606 was on display in Thirlmere, until it was put into store at the Broadmeadow Locomotive Depot at some point before 2012. In 2024, 2606 was among more than 40 items of historic rolling stock to be relocated to Chullora to be restored as display exhibits at the Chullora Heritage Hub.

Preserved Z26 class locomotives
| No. | Year | Current organisation | Location | Status | Ref |
|---|---|---|---|---|---|
| 2605 | 1891 | Lithgow State Mine Heritage Park & Railway | Lithgow | Undergoing working restoration | |
| 2606 | 1891 | Transport Heritage NSW | Chullora | Undergoing restoration | |
