= New South Wales D50 class locomotive =

Class of Australian 2-8-0 locomotives

New South Wales D50 class
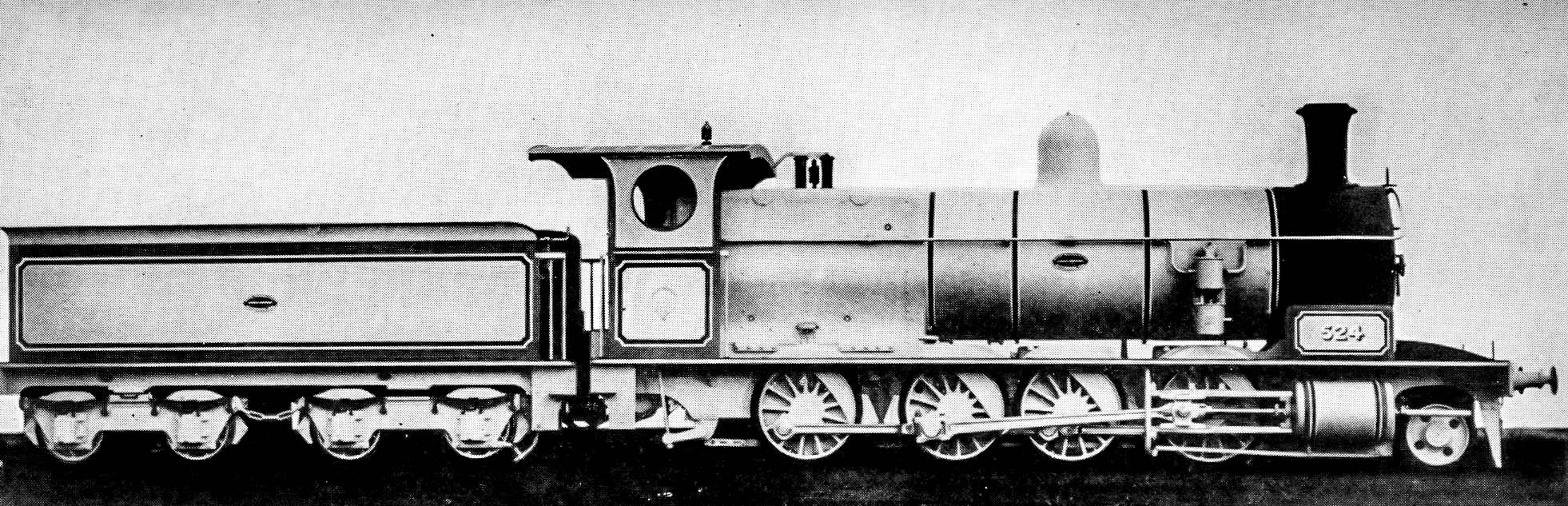
- Class D50 locomotive
Type and origin
- Power type: Steam
- Builder: Beyer, Peacock & Company (151); Dübs & Company (5); Neilson & Company (10); North British Locomotive Company (84); Clyde Engineering (30)
- Build date: 1896–1916
- Total produced: 280
Specifications
- Configuration
  - Whyte: 2-8-0
- Gauge: 1,435 mm (4 ft 8 1/2 in) standard gauge
- Driver dia.: 4 ft 3 in (1,295 mm)
- Adhesive weight: 126,000 lb (57,153 kg; 57 t)
- Loco weight: 139,000 lb (63,049 kg; 63 t)
- Firebox
  - Grate area: 30 sq ft (2.8 m^{2})
- Boiler pressure: 160 psi (1.10 MPa)
- Heating surface: 2,210 sq ft (205 m^{2})
- Cylinders: 2 outside
- Cylinder size: 21 in × 26 in (533 mm × 660 mm)
Performance figures
- Tractive effort: 30,576 lbf (136.0 kN)
- Factor of adh.: 4.10
Career
- Operators: New South Wales Government Railways
- Class: T524, D50 from 1924
- Number in class: 280
- Preserved: 5069, 5096, 5112, 5132
- Disposition: 4 preserved, 276 scrapped

The New South Wales D50 class is a class of 2-8-0 steam locomotives operated by the New South Wales Government Railways in Australia.

== History ==
The first was delivered in May 1896 by Beyer, Peacock & Company with further orders over the next 20 years seeing the class number 280. Their second and third coupled wheel tyres were flangeless to reduce curve friction.

During World War One, an additional 10 were under construction at the North British Locomotive Company, but these were not delivered to Australia, being taken over by the British War Office for the Royal Engineers Railway Operating Division. After the war, they were offered back to the New South Wales Government Railways at higher than new prices and in a badly worn condition. They were declined and eight locomotives were subsequently acquired by the Nord-Belge railway in Belgium and, following rebuilding, assigned to work coal trains along the Meuse Valley. The two other locomotives were acquired by S.A. Force, Eclairage et Docks de Gand in Ghent, Belgium.

The Commonwealth Railways also chose this design, purchasing eight K class engines for the Trans-Australian Railway.

The last 75 engines were built with superheaters and after being judged a success many of the class were retrofitted. Many engines of the class received turret type tenders in later years which provided better visibility when operating in reverse.

In the 1930s, 72 engines were withdrawn and after being used during the load testing of the Sydney Harbour Bridge in 1932 with most of these locomotives being later scrapped, although 14 engines were rebuilt with superheaters and returned to service. By mid-1964 there were only 113 engines left in service with the class of these kinds of engines by now normally restricted to working coal trains in the Hunter Valley and shunting duties in the larger marshalling yards throughout the system. Several of these heavy shunters were fitted with automatic couplings on the front buffer beam from 1960 onwards.

5069 and 5132 are both preserved by Dorrigo Steam Railway & Museum at Dorrigo. Both were two of the 88 locomotives used to load test the Sydney Harbour Bridge before it opened. The former is still in its original saturated condition and was operational in the 1980s, whilst 5132 is the only superheated 50 class engine preserved and is also fitted with the only preserved Mort's Dock & Engineering Company tender. Transport Heritage NSW's 5096 is also a saturated version and is stored at the Heritage Hub at Chullora Workshops.

5112, also in saturated condition, was purchased by the Bathurst Regional Council in 1974 and plinthed at Bathurst station in 1977. After being moved to Orange for a proposed overhaul that never eventuated, it was cosmetically restored at the Lithgow State Mine Heritage Park & Railway between 2005 and 2010 before being placed back on static display at Bathurst station. It is known as the "Chifley Engine" as it was regularly driven by future Prime Minister Ben Chifley before he entered politics.

== Preservation ==
Number	Manufacturer	Year	Owner	Location	Status	Ref
5069	Beyer, Peacock & Company	1902	Dorrigo Steam Railway & Museum	Dorrigo	Stored	Saturated
5096	Clyde Engineering	1907	Transport Heritage NSW	Chullora Heritage Hub	Stored	Saturated
5112	Clyde Engineering	1908	Bathurst Regional Council	Bathurst station	Static display	Saturated
5132	Beyer, Peacock & Company	1908	Dorrigo Steam Railway & Museum	Dorrigo	Stored	Superheated
