= NSWGR steam locomotive classification =

Numbering used by New South Wales Government Railways

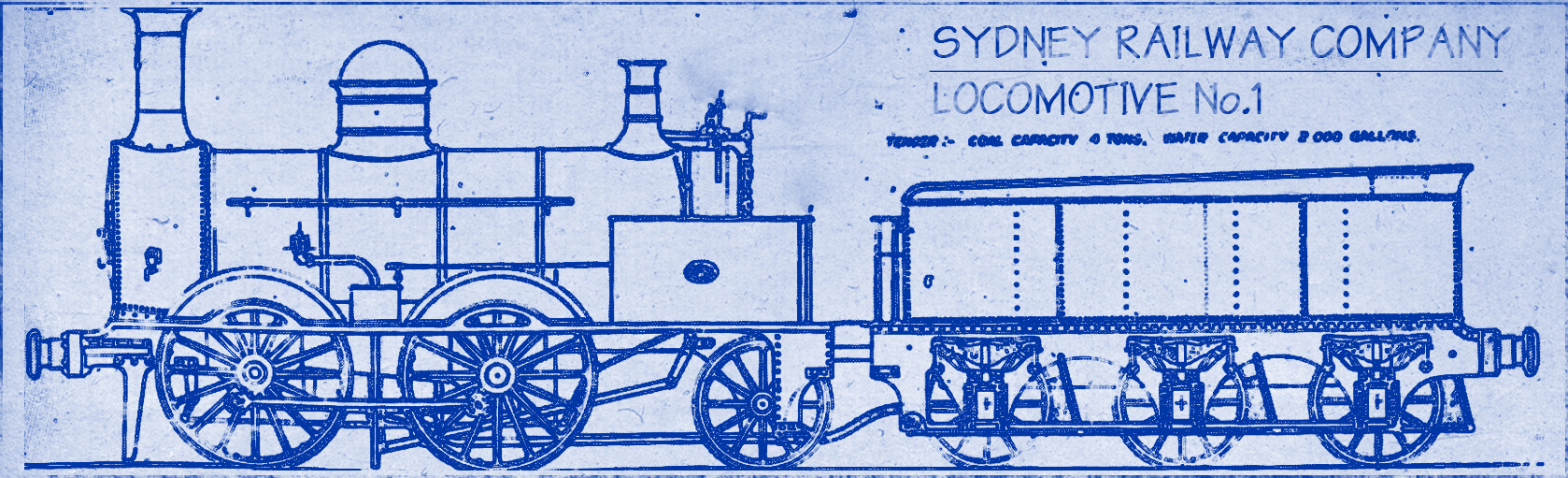
Locomotive No. 1 Drawing General Arrangement

In the first 36 years of its existence, the NSW Railways introduced 42 separate classes of locomotives. The appointment by the Premier of New South Wales, Henry Parkes of Mr E.M.G Eddy as Chief Commissioner in 1888 created an independent railway department and saw the following 36 years with only sixteen new classes produced.

== Classification ==
Steam Locomotive classification on the New South Wales Government Railways had three distinct classification systems.

=== From 1855 to 1890 (numerical) ===
The classification was taken from the road number given to the first engine in each class.

The engines attached to the then isolated Northern section had the terminal letter "N" added to the road number.

=== From October 1890 to August 1924 (letter and number) ===
A letter was selected arbitrarily and placed before the first number allotted to each class. e.g. the 93-class became the A.93-class. Letters were initially allocated, in alphabetic order, by class size. The 93 class had the most locomotives in traffic (77) so they were given the letter 'A', the 205 class were the next most numerous (70 in traffic), so were classified 'B', the 79 class the third most numerous (68 in service) so were granted the letter 'C' and so on. With the opening of the Hawkesbury Bridge in May 1889, the Northern section engines were renumbered and grouped with the others of the Sydney system, using the numbers 388–435. the final "N" being dropped .

In general practice, the class letter only was quoted, without the number, except when there were one or two variants using a common class-letter.

=== From August 1924 (letter and number) ===
All engines were given new four-figure numbers, the first two digits indicating the class and the second two, the engine number, arranged in chronological order of commencement of service. When the number of engines in a class exceeded 99, the class number (first two digits) was increased by 1, e.g., the 137th engine of the 32-class was 3337. Engines numbered from 1000 up were the first to be renumbered using the new system to prevent two locomotives sharing the same number being in service at the same time.

For administration purposes, a letter was added to denote certain characteristics of locomotives. These letters weren't generally found on the running numbers of locomotives. The initial letters indicate :

- "C"-three driving axles;
- "D"-four driving axles;
- "AD"-two articulated sets of four driving axles (Only for the AD60s);
- "Z"-old classes which would never be repeated, and
- "X" -associated with the 10-class, which included all types of duplicates; yard and depot locomotives, crane locomotives, locomotive and accident cranes and special equipment.

Initial letters are dropped in general usage with a "C.36-class" engine universally known as a "36-class".

== Classes ==
Classification
Image	Whyte notation	pre 1890	1890–1924	post 1924	Type	Year
Class 1	0-4-2	1			Mixed Traffic	1855
Class 5	0-4-2	5			Mixed Traffic	1856
Class 6	2-2-2	6			Passenger	1856
Class 1N	0-4-2	1N			Mixed Traffic	1857
Class 8	2-2-2T	8			Passenger Tank	1859
Class 9	2-2-2	9			Passenger, Coal	1858
Class 13	2-4-0	13			Mixed Traffic	1863
Class E.17	0-6-0	17	E.17		Goods	1863
Class G.23	2-4-0	23	G.23		Passenger	1863
Class 6N	2-4-0T	6N			Mineral Tank Type	1863
Class 8N	2-2-2	8N			Passenger	1864
Class S.29	0-6-0T	29–31, 9N	S.29		Box Saddle Tank	1864
Class 14	2-2-2	14	T.14		Express Passenger	1865
Class 36	0-4-2	36	M.36	X.10	Mixed Traffic	1870
Class 10	2-4-0	10			Passenger	1870
Class 20N	0-6-0T	20N			Goods Saddle Tank	1872
Class (1st) 48	0-6-0T	(1st) 48			Goods Tank	1872
Class 23N	0-6-0	23N			Goods	1874
Class (2nd) 48	0-6-0	(2nd) 48	I.48		Goods	1874
Class O.60	0-6-0	60	O.60		Passenger	1874
Class P.127	0-6-0T	66	P.127		Small Saddle Tank	1874
Class N.67	0-6-0T	67	N.67		Suburban Passenger Tank	1875
Class C.79	4-4-0	79	C.79	Z.12	Passenger	1877
Class A.93	0-6-0	93	A.93	Z.19	Goods	1877
Class U.105	4-4-0	105	U.105 (later S.105)		Passenger	1877
Class Z28	2-8-0	131	J.131	Z.28	Goods	1879
Class Q.158	4-4-0T	158	Q.158		Suburban Passenger Tank	1880
Class B.205	2-6-0	205	B.205	Z.25	Goods	1882
Class D.255	4-4-0	255	D.255	Z.15	Express Passenger	1882
Class D.261	4-4-0	261	D.261	Z.16	Express Passenger	1883
Class R.285	0-6-0T	285	R.285	Z.18	Suburban Passenger Tank	1884
Class K.294	2-6-0	294	K.294		Goods	1885
Class L.304	2-6-0	304	L.304	Z.21	Passenger	1885
Class D.334	4-4-0	334	D.334	Z.16	Express Passenger	1885
Class 351	2-4-0T	351	F.351	X.10	Suburban Passenger Tank	1885
Class H.373	4-4-0	373	H.373	Z.17	Passenger	1887
Class L.436	2-6-0		L.436	Z.22	Passenger	1890
Class M.40	4-4-2T		M.40	Z.11	Suburban Passenger Tank	1891
Class B.55	2-6-0		B.55	Z.24	Goods	1891
Class Z26	2-6-2T		I.17	Z.26	Mineral Tank	1891
Class E.10	2-6-4T		E.10	Z.20	Mineral Tank	1891
Class O.446	4-6-0		O.446	Z.23	Passenger	1891
Class Z29	2-8-0		J.483	Z.29	Goods	1891
Class P.6	4-6-0		P.6	C.32	Passenger	1892
Class Z28	2-8-0		J.522	Z.28	Goods	1893
Class D50	2-8-0		T.524	D.50	Goods	1896
Class CC.79	4-4-2T		CC.79	Z.13	Suburban Passenger Tank	1896
Class A/E	2-6-4T		A/E	Z.20	Mineral Tank E.10 rebuild	1902
Class CG	4-4-0		CG	Z.14	(C)onverted (G)-Class	1903
Class C30	4-6-4T		S.636	C.30	Suburban Passenger Tank	1903
Class N.928	4-6-0		N.928	C.34	Express Passenger	1909
Class Q.158	4-4-0		Q.158		Light Mixed Traffic	1910
Class D53	2-8-0		TF.939	D.53	Goods	1912
Class NN.1027	4-6-0		NN.1027	C.35	Express passenger	1914
Class G.1204	2-6-0		G.1204	Z.27	Goods	1917
Class D55	2-8-0		K.1353	D.55	Goods	1918
Class 36	4-6-0			C.36	Express passenger	1925
Class C30T	4-6-0			C.30T	Branch line work	1928
Class D57	4-8-2			D.57	Heavy Goods	1929
Class C38	4-6-2			C.38	Express passenger	1943
Class D58	4-8-2			D.58	Heavy Goods	1950
Class AD60	4-8-4+4-8-4			AD.60	Heavy Goods	1952
Class D59	2-8-2			D.59	Goods	1952

== See also ==
- Preserved steam locomotives of New South Wales
