= Z17 =

Z17 may refer to:

- 5-Z17 or Farben chord, in ascending order C-G♯-B-E-A, used in Five Pieces for Orchestra by Arnold Schoenberg
- 6-Z17, the Forte number for the all-trichord hexachord, a unique hexachord that contains all twelve trichords
- German destroyer Z17 Diether von Roeder, Type 1936-class destroyer built for the Kriegsmarine in the late 1930s
- New South Wales Z17 class locomotive (formally H.373 class), a class of steam locomotive built for the New South Wales Government Railways of Australia
- Small nucleolar RNA Z17, non-coding RNA (ncRNA) molecule which functions in the biogenesis (modification) of other small nuclear RNAs (snRNAs)
