= Z16 =

Z16 may refer to:

- Chevrolet Chevelle Z16 SS396, a Chevrolet Chevelle option produced in 1965
- German destroyer Z16 Friedrich Eckoldt, Type 1934A-class destroyer built for Nazi Germany's Kriegsmarine in the late 1930s
- New South Wales Z16 class locomotive (formally D.261 class), a class of steam locomotives built for the New South Wales Government Railways in Australia
- Z16, a Nissan engine seen in a few low-end model Datsun Bluebird 910s for the Japanese domestic market
- IBM z16, a mainframe server introduced on April 5, 2022
