= Z21 =

Z21 or Z-21 may refer to:

- Flitzer Z-21 or Staaken Flitzer, a British amateur-built aircraft produced by Flitzer Sportplanes of Aberdare, Wales
- German destroyer Z21 Wilhelm Heidkamp, Type 1936-class destroyer built for the Kriegsmarine in the late 1930s
- Harbin Z-21, a Chinese attack helicopter
- New South Wales Z21 class locomotive (formally L.304 class), a class of steam locomotives built for the New South Wales Government Railways in Australia
- The 2013 album #Z21 by Sweetbox, or the lead single from that album
- Fleischmann/Roco Z21, a digital model railroad control system
