= Z29 =

Z29 may refer to:

- German destroyer Z29
- New South Wales Z29 class locomotive
- Finley Air Force Station (NORAD id: Z-29; later Z-303), Finley, North Dakota, USA
- Gettysburg Air Force Station (NORAD id: Z-29), Gettysburg, South Dakota, USA
- Zenith Data Systems Z-29 computer terminal

== See also ==
- 29 (disambiguation)
- Z (disambiguation)
