= 3526 =

Preserved NSWGR C35 class locomotive

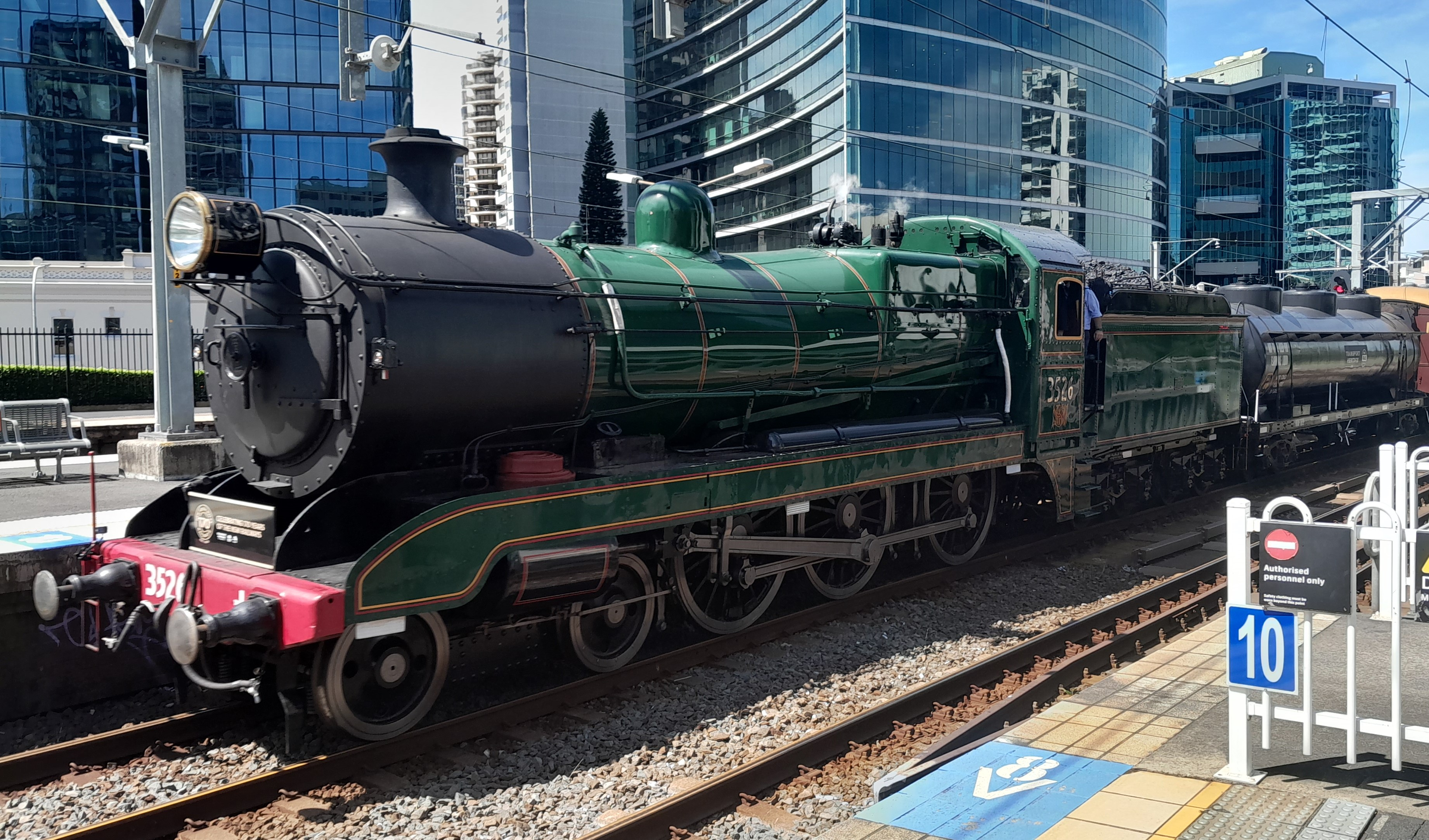
- 3526 at Parramatta during the train race of 2025
Type and origin
- Power type: Steam
- Builder: Eveleigh Railway Workshops
- Serial number: 118
- Build date: March 1917
Specifications
- Configuration
  - Whyte: 4-6-0
  - UIC: 2′C h
- Gauge: 4 ft 8 1/2 in (1,435 mm) standard gauge
- Driver dia.: 5 ft 9 in (1,753 mm)
- Fuel type: Coal
- Fuel capacity: 9 1/2 long tons (10.6 short tons; 9.7 t)
- Water cap.: 4,000 imp gal (4,800 US gal; 18,000 L)
Career
- Class: C35

Locomotive 3526 is a two-cylinder, simple, non-condensing, coal-fired superheated, 4-6-0 New South Wales C35 class locomotive express passenger steam locomotive. The only C35 class left in existence, and is operational. The class is commonly referred to as Nannies or Naughty Nannies due to their pre-1924 class designation of NN.

== Construction ==
3526 was completed by the New South Wales Government Railways' Eveleigh Railway Workshops in March 1917.

== In service ==
On entering service as one of the 35 members of the NN class, it was allocated road number 1314, being renumbered in 1924. In the early 1930s, it was one of three C35s painted Oxford blue to operate the Caves Express. Throughout its service life, it received the various modifications made to the class, and was rebuilt with new frames and cab in July 1940 when the class suffered from frame cracking. After its rebuild, 3526 received a lined green paint scheme. In 1964, 3526 received a Commonwealth Engineering built tender from a scrapped standard goods locomotive to increase its coal and water capacity.

== Demise and preservation ==
3526 was withdrawn from service in 1967 and retained for preservation, being placed in the custody of the New South Wales Rail Transport Museum (now the NSW Rail Museum) where it remained operational until 1974. It received an original type C35 class tender, Tab No. 1309, which came from locomotive 3519. It was repainted Oxford blue to represent 'it during its period hauling the Caves Express, initially with heavy white lining, and from 1971 with gold lining. With the NSWRTM relocating, on 25 June 1975, it hauled 7100 and 2606 from Enfield to Thirlmere and was then withdrawn.

== Restoration ==
In 1983, the boiler clothing was removed for assessment of the boiler, and in 1990 restoration to operation began in earnest. During 1990, a spare 35-class boiler number 3504C was also retrieved from static use at the old Eveleigh Railway Workshops and is now stored at Thirlmere. Completion of the restoration was achieved in early 2004 after a government grant for new boiler tubes. The previous deep blue livery was replaced by unlined black to reflect the locomotive's appearance in later years of its service life. As noted above, 3526 did not carry Caves Express colours in regular service in its current, rebuilt form with new frames and cab: in this form it carried first lined green and then unlined black. 3526 eventually returned to service and ran in its black livery and while it was active at the time, it not only made a few appearances on the mainline but it also appeared at day out with Thomas events where the locomotive plays Donald from Thomas the tank engine series. 3526 played Donald from 2009 up to 2012 when the locomotive was taken out of service traffic in which the role of Donald was assumed by 3526’s stablemate 2705.

In July 2014, an overhaul commenced to conduct repairs on the tender tank due to its poor condition. When the tank was removed, high amounts of corrosion was discovered in the frames of the tender, rendering the locomotive inoperable. A larger inspection of the locomotive then occurred, leading further issues to be uncovered. According to the Transport Heritage New South Wales Fleet Manager, the restoration of 3526 represents the most comprehensive overhaul of any of the THNSW steam locomotive fleet. The repairs done to the loco during the restoration include: heavy boiler repairs in the firebox, replacement of the superheater element, replacement of the tender tank, new tender underframes, reconditioning of the tender bogies, new crankpins and tyres, new axle boxes, rebuild of the locomotives leading bogie, rebuild of the engine drag box, air compressor restoration, replacement of the boiler cladding, repairs to the fireman's side cylinder casting and new front cylinder covers.

On 4 March 2018, the overhaul of 3526 was completed and the locomotive was unveiled at the Thirlmere Festival of Steam 2018 wearing a green livery. 3526 returned to mainline operations at the annual Transport Heritage Expo in 2018, replacing 3642 that was in need of repair.

== See also ==
New South Wales C35 class locomotive
