= Caves Express =

Former railway service in Australia

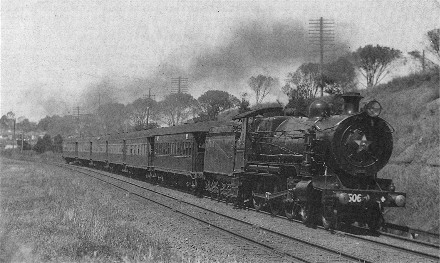
- 3506 hauls the Caves Express past Parramatta Park in 1933

Overview
- Service type: Passenger train
- Status: Ceased
- First service: 11 November 1929
- Last service: 1956
- Former operator: New South Wales Government Railways

Route
- Termini: Sydney; Mount Victoria
- Distance travelled: 127 kilometres (79 mi)
- Line used: Main Western

The Caves Express was an Australian special passenger rail service that operated between 1929 and 1942 on the Blue Mountains line in New South Wales. The name was derived from the nearby Jenolan Caves.

== Introduction ==
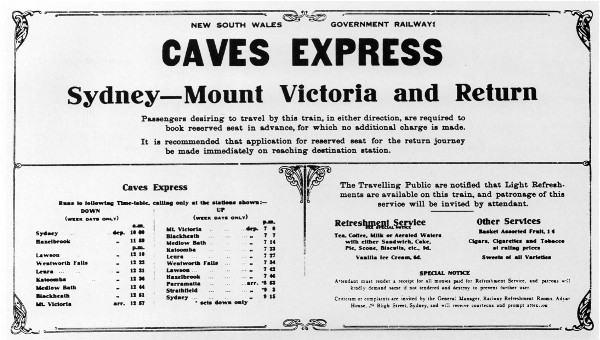

The railway from Sydney to the Blue Mountains enjoyed a monopolistic position in the early 1920s as much of the road from Parramatta onwards was unsealed. In 1927, a large improvement came about with the superseding of the route from Emu Plains to Blaxland via Lennox Bridge, with a sealed Great Western Highway, partially using the old railway formation over the Knapsack Viaduct. An effect of the improved road was to take some traffic away from the railway.

In order to stem the decrease in passengers taking place and with a desire to even improve patronage beyond previous figures, the New South Wales Government Railways introduced the Caves Express on 11 November 1929. The journey from Sydney to Mount Victoria took 2 hours and 30 minutes, the timing being achieved by the train being limited to five carriages with a total weight of just 125 tons and the elimination of many intermediate stops.

In November 1931, the C35 class was assigned to the express. In July 1933, three locomotives of the class, 3506, 3526 and 3535, were painted in Caledonian Blue at the Eveleigh Railway Workshops. In the summer of 1936, the express was taken over by the larger C36 class.

In 1942 as a wartime economy measure, the Caves Express was suspended. It had a mediocre revival between 1953 and 1956, when it re-appeared in the timetables for Fridays and Saturdays only, running to a semi-fast schedule in the westbound direction only.

== Preservation ==
Car RBR 1049, previously used on the Caves Express, has been restored to the blue and gold livery. It is preserved and on display at Valley Heights Rail Museum.
