= New South Wales Z22 class locomotive =

Class of Australian 2-6-0 locomotives

New South Wales Z22 class
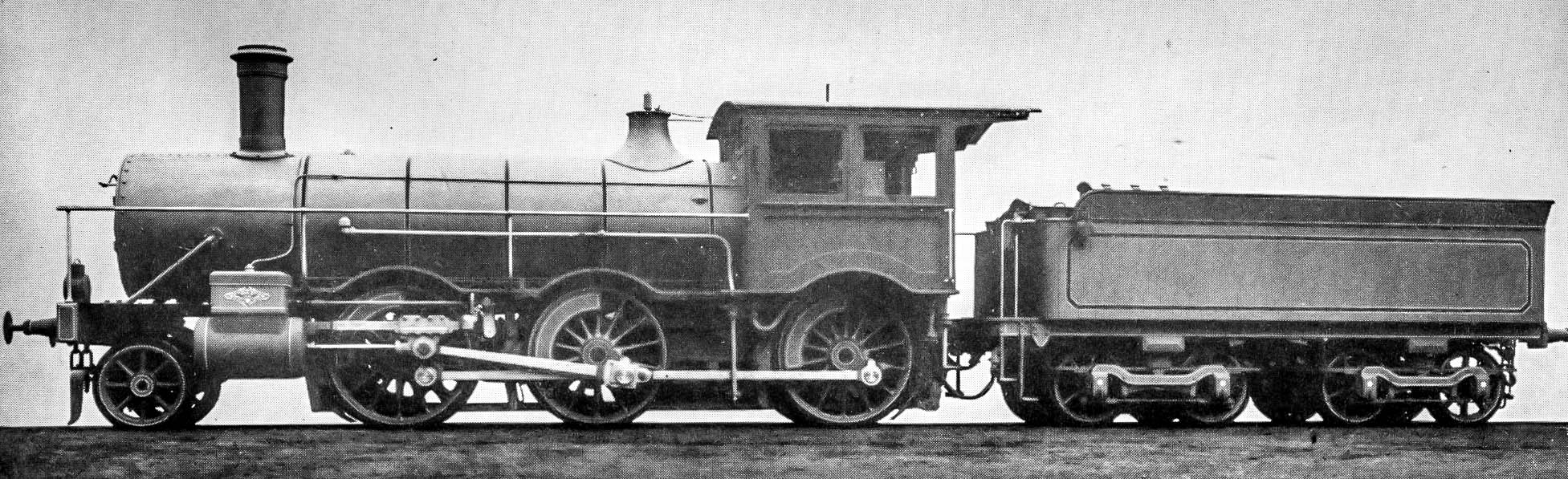
- L.436 class locomotive
Type and origin
- Power type: Steam
- Builder: Dübs & Company
- Build date: 1890
- Total produced: 10
Specifications
- Configuration
  - Whyte: 2-6-0
- Gauge: 4 ft 8 1/2 in (1,435 mm) standard gauge
Career
- Nicknames: Scotch Yankees
- Preserved: 0
- Scrapped: 1927-37

The Z22 class (formerly L.436 class) was a class of steam locomotives built for the New South Wales Government Railways in Australia.

== See also ==
- NSWGR steam locomotive classification
