= New South Wales C35 class locomotive =

Class of Australian 4-6-0 locomotives

New South Wales C35 class
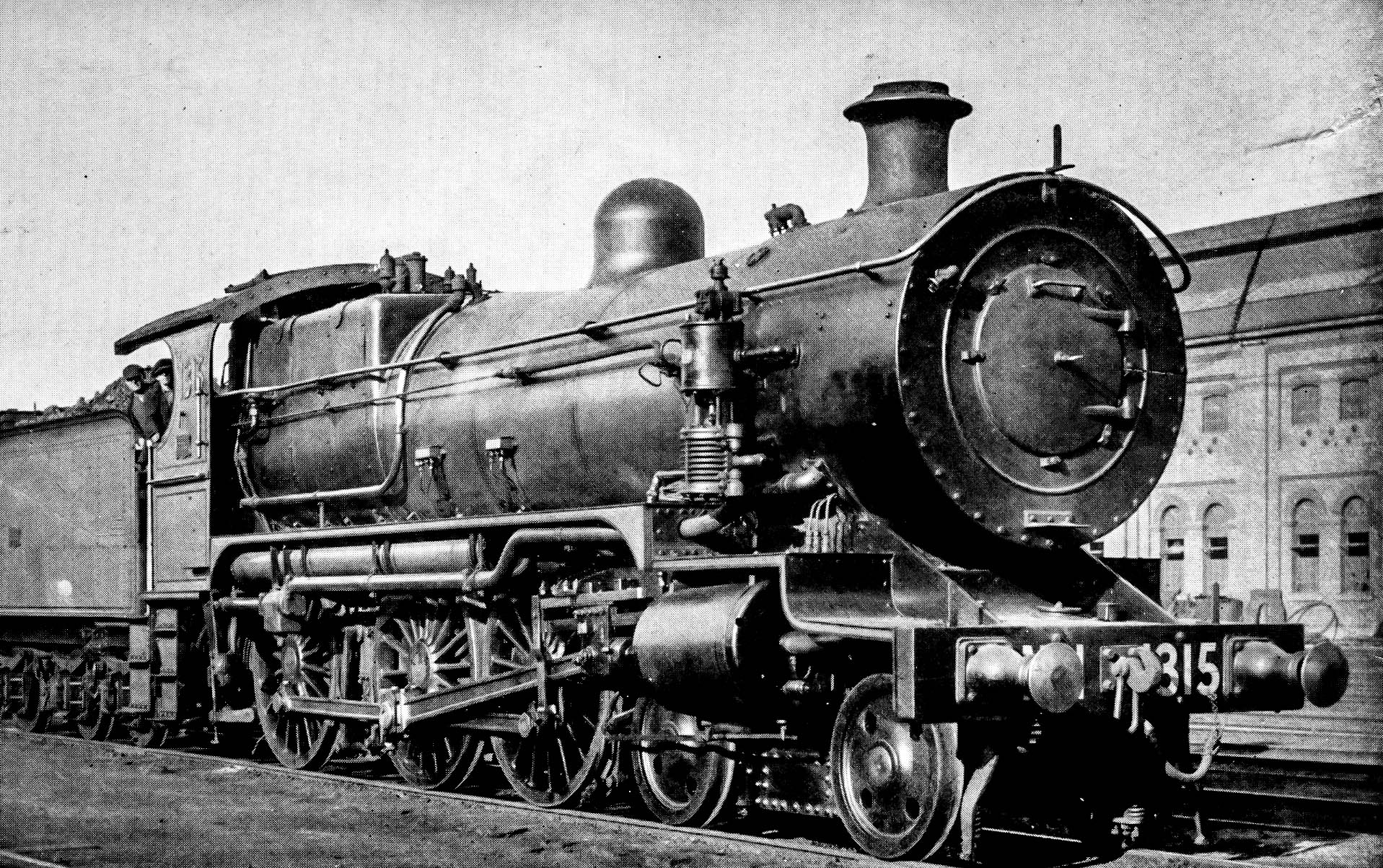
- Class C35 locomotive
Type and origin
- Power type: Steam
- Builder: Eveleigh Railway Workshops
- Build date: 1914–1923
- Total produced: 35
Specifications
- Configuration
  - Whyte: 4-6-0
  - UIC: 2'Ch
- Gauge: 4 ft 8 1/2 in (1,435 mm) standard gauge
- Driver dia.: 5 ft 9 in (1,753 mm)
- Adhesive weight: 139,000 lb (63,049 kg; 63 t)
- Loco weight: 183,000 lb (83,007 kg; 83 t)
- Fuel type: Coal
- Firebox
  - Grate area: 31 sq ft (2.9 m^{2})
- Boiler pressure: 180 psi (1.24 MPa)
- Heating surface: 2,235 sq ft (207.6 m^{2})
- Superheater
  - Heating area: 545 sq ft (50.6 m^{2})
- Cylinders: Two, outside
- Cylinder size: 22.5 in × 26 in (572 mm × 660 mm)
Performance figures
- Tractive effort: 29,186 lbf (129.8 kN)
- Factor of adh.: 4.75
Career
- Operators: New South Wales Government Railways
- Class: NN1027, C35 from 1924
- Numbers: 3501-3535 from 1924
- Preserved: 3526
- Disposition: 1 preserved, 34 scrapped

The C35 class is a class of steam locomotives built by Eveleigh Railway Workshops between 1914 and 1923 for the New South Wales Government Railways in Australia. Despite their elegant, somewhat English looking appearance, they suffered a long period of teething troubles and were poor performers, especially on long climbs.

== In service ==
They took over hauling The Fish, from Sydney Central to Mount Victoria in June 1918 and the Caves Express on the same route in 1932. To operate this, 3506, 3526 and 3535 were painted in Caledonian Blue to match the carriages.

After being replaced by 36 class locomotives on Southern and Western services, they were transferred to operate North Coast and Northern Tablelands express and mail trains until replaced by diesels in the 1950s. The first was withdrawn in February 1959. During the last years of service, they were confined to working both passenger and freight trains north of Gosford on the Main North line. The last was withdrawn in August 1968.

== Modifications ==
In May 1935, an ACFI feedwater heater was fitted to 3508. It was apparently not a success as it was removed in 1939 and no other member was so fitted.

From December 1937, the class was rebuilt with heavier frames, rebalanced driving wheels, new boilers and new cabs with more shelter, replacing their Great Western Railway look.

== Preservation ==
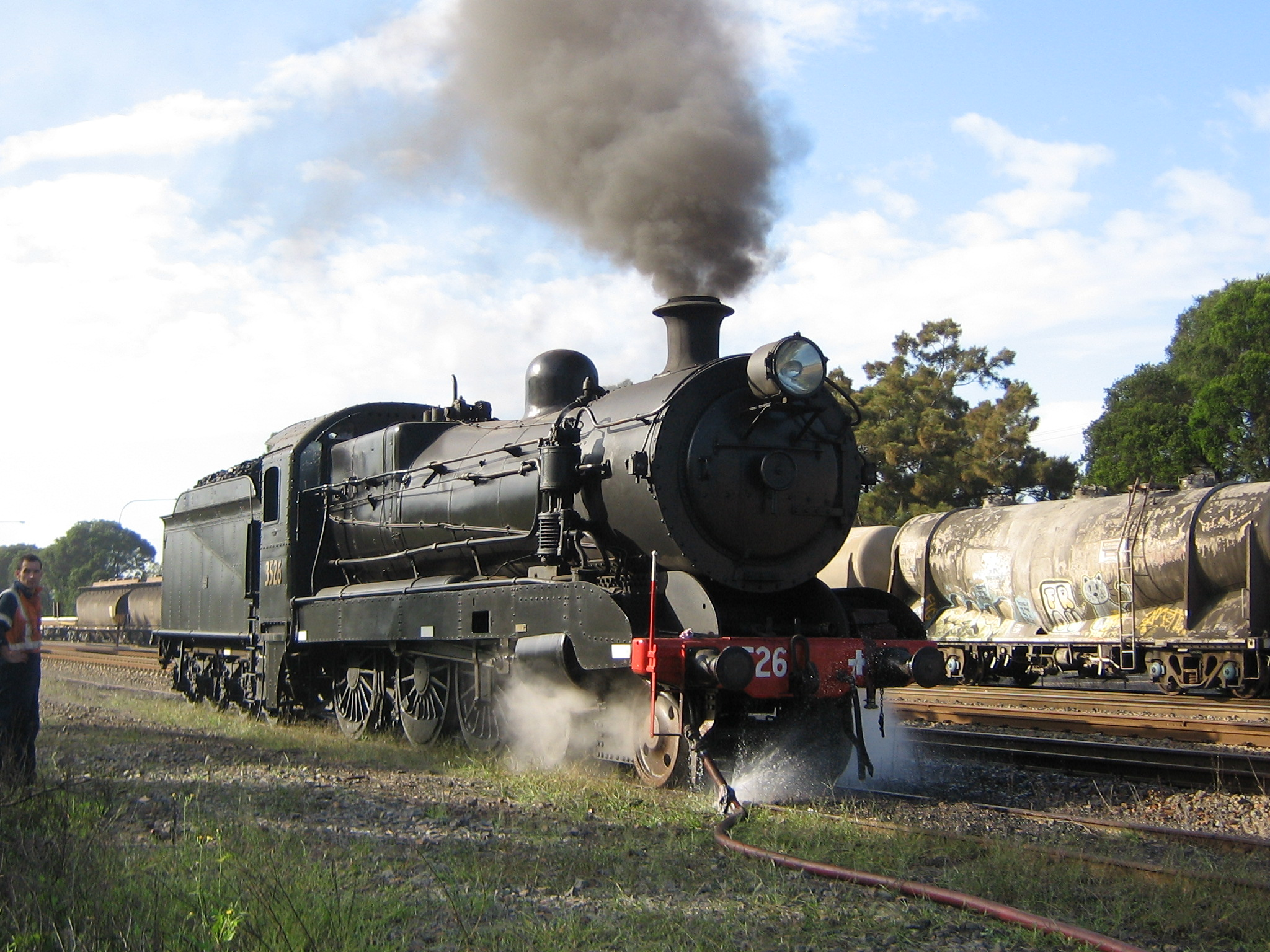
3526 taking on water at the Hunter Valley Steamfest, Maitland

No. 3526 is the only surviving locomotive in the class. It is owned by Transport Heritage NSW and is based at the NSW Rail Museum at Thirlmere. The locomotive is in operational condition.

== See also ==
- NSWGR steam locomotive classification
- 3526
- Media related to New South Wales C35 class locomotives at Wikimedia Commons
