= New South Wales Z23 class locomotive =

Class of Australian 4-6-0 locomotives

New South Wales Z23 class
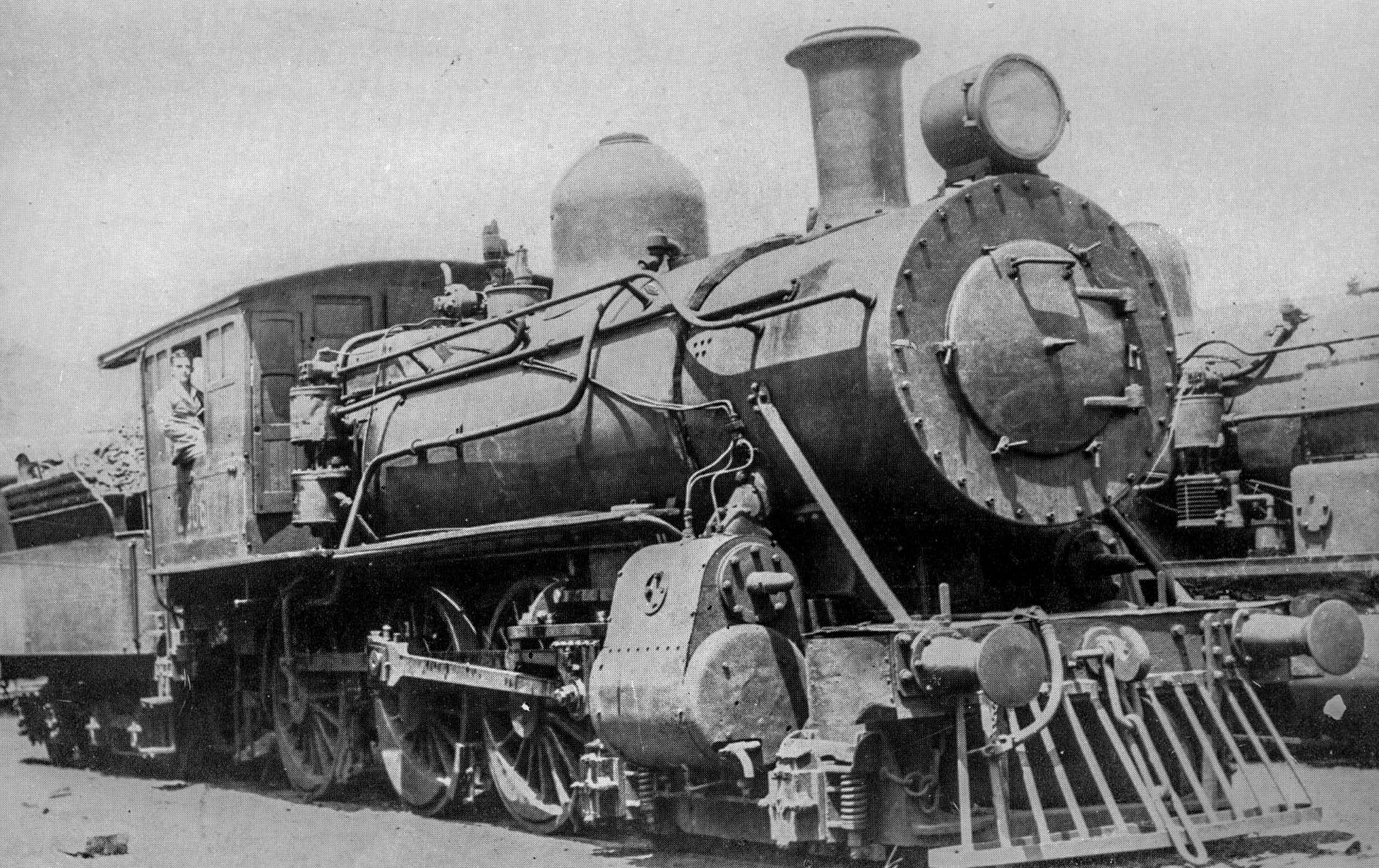
- O.446 class locomotive
Type and origin
- Power type: Steam
- Builder: Baldwin Locomotive Works
- Build date: 1891
- Total produced: 12
Specifications
- Configuration
  - Whyte: 4-6-0
- Gauge: 4 ft 8 1/2 in (1,435 mm) standard gauge
- Driver dia.: 5 ft 1 in (1,549 mm)
- Total weight: 90.37 long tons (101.21 short tons; 91.82 t)
- Firebox
  - Grate area: 27.7 sq ft (2.57 m^{2})
- Boiler pressure: 160 psi (1,100 kPa)
- Cylinder size: 21 in × 24 in (533 mm × 610 mm)
Performance figures
- Tractive effort: 22,209 lbf (98.79 kN)
Career
- Withdrawn: 1933-1946
- Disposition: All scrapped

The Z23 class (formerly O.446 class) was a class of steam locomotives built in 1891 for the New South Wales Government Railways in Australia.

== Royal Commission ==
Although this may have been the result of a contemporary anti-American bias, these locomotives were said to be too heavy and too wide at the cylinders, and were the subject of a Royal Commission.

== Withdrawal ==
2305 was the first withdrawn in May 1933. By 1941, only six were left, with the last, 2304, being withdrawn in September 1946. None has survived onto preservation.

== See also ==
- NSWGR steam locomotive classification
