= New South Wales Z11 class locomotive =

Class of 4-4-2T steam locomotives operated in Australia

New South Wales Z11 class
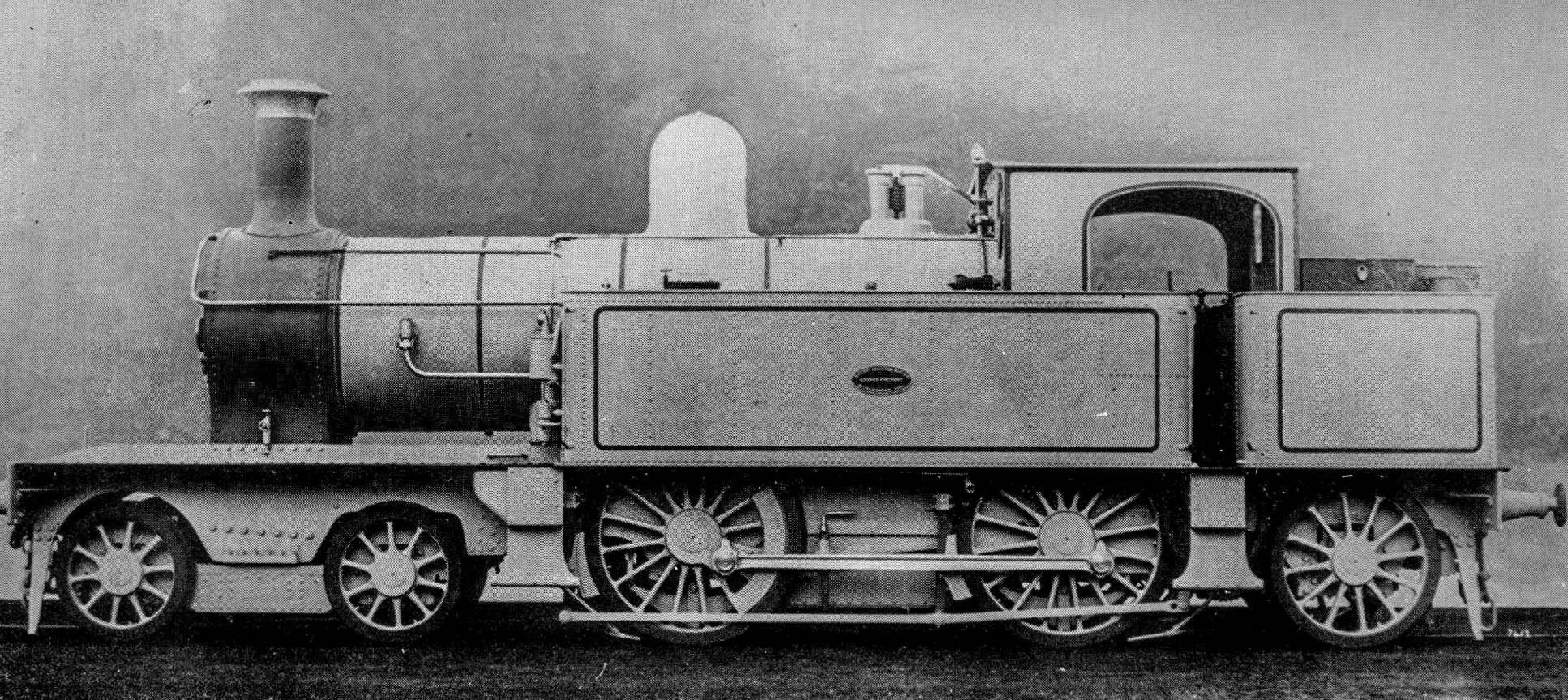
- M.40 (Z11) class tank locomotive
Type and origin
- Power type: Steam
- Builder: Beyer, Peacock & Company
- Serial number: 3324–3338
- Build date: 1891
- Total produced: 15
Specifications
- Configuration
  - Whyte: 4-4-2T
- Gauge: 4 ft 8 1/2 in (1,435 mm) standard gauge
- Leading dia.: 3 ft 25 in (1,549 mm)
- Driver dia.: 5 ft 8 in (1,727 mm)
- Trailing dia.: 4 ft 0 in (1,219 mm)
- Wheelbase: 28 ft 1 in (8.56 m)
- Length: 38 ft 1 1/2 in (11.62 m)
- Axle load: 14 long tons 8 cwt (32,300 lb or 14.6 t)
- Adhesive weight: 28 long tons 14 cwt (64,300 lb or 29.2 t)
- Loco weight: 56 long tons 9 cwt 1 qr (126,480 lb or 57.37 t)
- Fuel type: Coal
- Fuel capacity: 2 1/4 long tons (2.5 short tons; 2.3 t)
- Water cap.: 1,200 imp gal (5,500 L; 1,400 US gal)
- Boiler: 4 ft 5 in (1,346 mm)
- Boiler pressure: 160 psi (1,103 kPa)
- Heating surface
  - Firebox: 18.75 sq ft (1.742 m^{2})
  - Tubes: (219) 1 7/8 sq ft (0.17 m^{2})
  - Tubes and flues: 1,221.0 sq ft (113.43 m^{2})
  - Total surface: 113.0 sq ft (10.50 m^{2})
- Cylinders: 2 inside
- Cylinder size: 17 in × 26 in (432 mm × 660 mm)
- Valve gear: Stephenson
Performance figures
- Tractive effort: 15,800 lbf (70 kN)
Career
- Operators: New South Wales Government Railways
- Number in class: 15
- Numbers: As built: 40–54; Post 1924: 1101–1113
- Disposition: All scrapped

The Z11 class, formerly the M40 class, was a class of steam locomotives built by Beyer, Peacock & Company for the New South Wales Government Railways in Australia.

They entered suburban traffic in Sydney in 1891. They were primarily intended for use on the steeply-graded Main Northern line from Strathfield to Hornsby and North Shore line from Milsons Point to Hornsby, hence their hefty weight. They were never noted for spectacular performance.

Between 1906 and 1910, they were rebuilt with Belpaire boilers. They were superseded by the Class 30 and transferred for use on Newcastle suburban services. As part of the 1924 reclassification scheme, the remaining 13 members of the class were reclassified as the Z11 class, numbered 1101 to 1113, 50 having been sold to Australian Iron & Steel and 51 to the South Maitland Railway. Post renumbering, 1104 was to the Nepean Sand & Gravel Company, Richmond and 1111 to Southern Portland Cement, Berrima. The remainder were sold for scrap between 1925 and 1927. None were preserved.
