= New South Wales Z14 class locomotive =

Class of 4-4-0 steam locomotives operated in Australia

New South Wales Z14 class
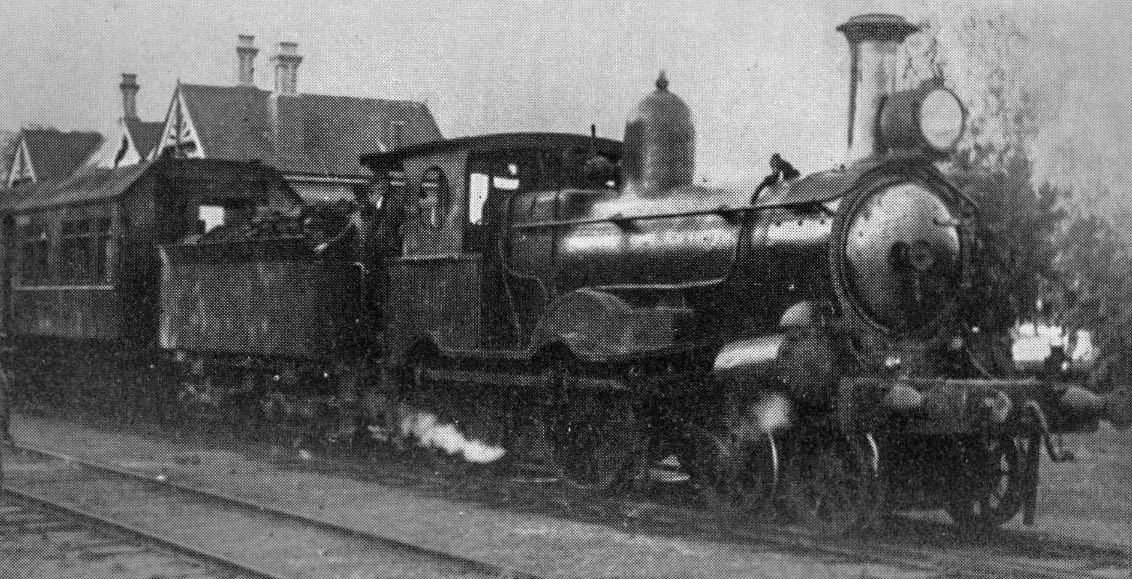
Type and origin
- Power type: Steam
- Builder: Beyer, Peacock & Company
- Build date: 1865
- Total produced: 13
- Rebuilder: Eveleigh Railway Workshops
- Rebuild date: 1903–1905
Specifications
- Configuration
  - Whyte: Built as 2-4-0, rebuilt as 4-4-0
- Gauge: 4 ft 8 1/2 in (1,435 mm) standard gauge
- Fuel type: Coal
- Cylinders: 2
- Cylinder size: 18 in × 24 in (460 mm × 610 mm)
- Valve gear: Stephenson
Performance figures
- Tractive effort: 12,400 lb (5,600 kg) (1st batch); 13,100 lb (5,900 kg) (2nd batch)
Career
- Operators: New South Wales Government Railways
- Number in class: 13
- Numbers: As built: 14N–16N, 23–28, 32–35; From 1924: 1401–1413
- Delivered: 1865–1870
- First run: 1865
- Last run: 1948
- Disposition: All scrapped

The Z14 class was a class of 2-4-0 and 4-4-0 steam locomotives operated by the New South Wales Government Railways in Australia. They were built by Beyer, Peacock and Company in 1865, and were rebuilt between 1903 and 1905.

== History ==
In 1865, Beyer, Peacock & Company delivered the first of nine G class 2-4-0 steam locomotives to the New South Wales Government Railways for passenger service. Three, numbered 14N–16N, entered service on the isolated northern section north of Singleton on the Main Northern line. The other six, 23–28, operated on the Main Southern line between Picton and Goulburn, and the Main Western line between Penrith and Mount Victoria.

The 5'9" driving wheels proved too large for the steep gradients to which they were assigned, and a follow-up order for four, numbered 32–35, were built with 5'6" driving wheels. They were reclassified in 1889 as the G class before being withdrawn in the 1890s.

After being stored for ten years, all members of the G23 class were rebuilt as 4-4-0s at Eveleigh Railway Workshops with Belpaire boilers and four wheel Bissell leading bogies. They were renamed the Cg class in view of the similarity of the rebuilt locomotives to the C class 4-4-0s of 1879. As part of the 1924 reclassification scheme, all 13 were reclassified as the Z14 class and renumbered 1401 to 1413.

The last in service was 1412 which was retired in 1948. The last recorded as condemned was 1405 in 1950. Scrapping of the class commenced in 1937 and was concluded in 1952.
