= Commonwealth Railways F class =

American built locomotive used in Australia

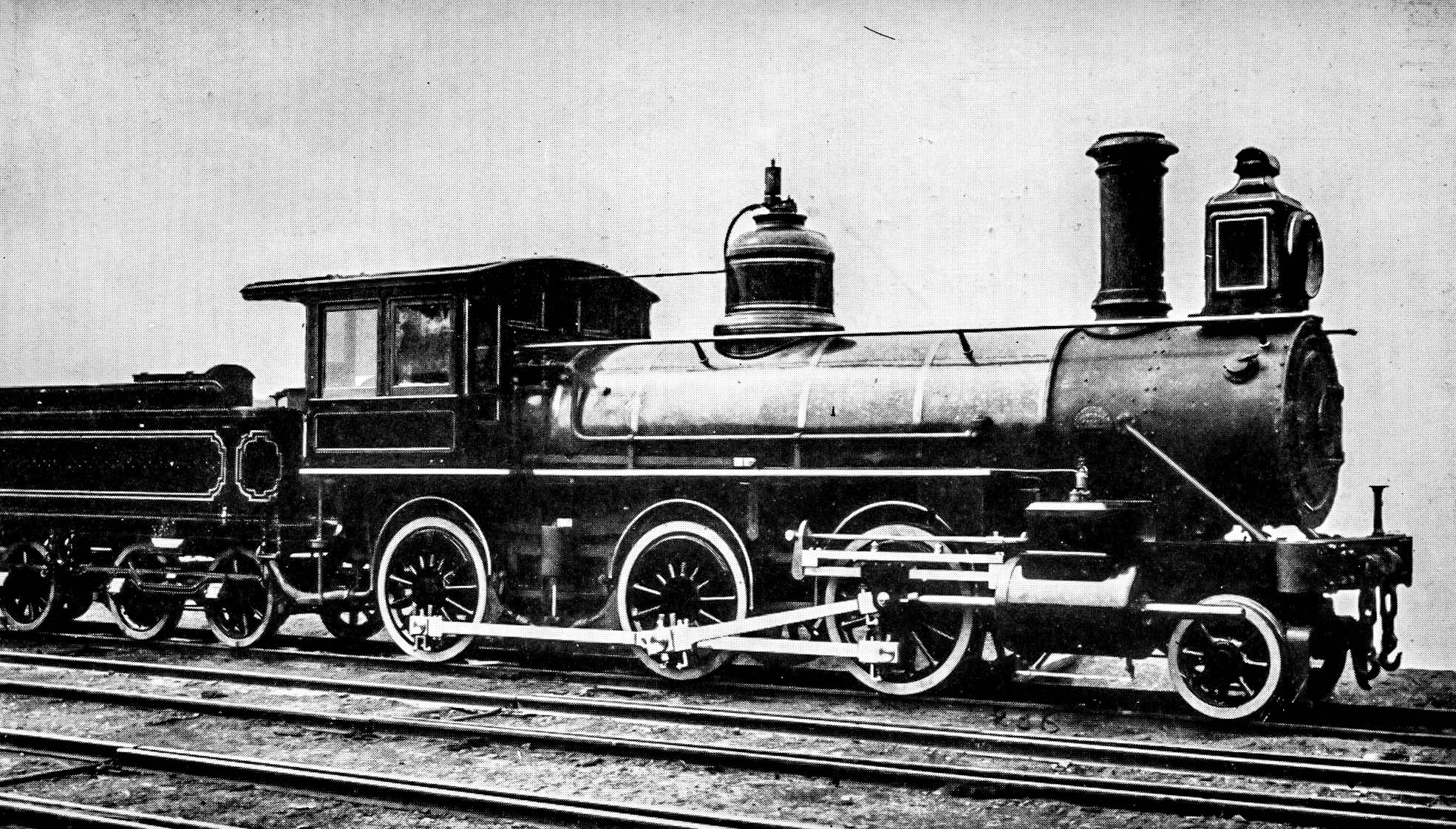
- A Commonwealth Railways F class, when first built as a member of the K.294 class for the NSWGR.
Type and origin
- Power type: Steam
- Designer: Mr W. Scott
- Builder: Baldwin Locomotive Works
- Serial number: 7388
- Build date: 1885
Specifications
- Configuration
  - Whyte: 2-6-0
- Gauge: 4 ft 8 1/2 in (1,435 mm) standard gauge
- Wheel diameter: 4 ft.
- Total weight: 68 tons (17 cwt)
- Fuel type: Coal
- Fuel capacity: 6 tons
- Water cap.: 2,300 gallons
- Firebox
  - Grate area: 17 sq. ft.
- Boiler pressure: 140 p.s.i.
- Cylinder size: 19 in. x 24 in.
- Valve gear: Stephenson valve gear
Performance figures
- Tractive effort: 19,500 lbs.
Career
- Operators: New South Wales Government Railways; Commonwealth Railways
- Numbers: K295 (NSWGR); F55 (CR)
- Withdrawn: November 1921
- Scrapped: June 1937
- Disposition: Scrapped

The Commonwealth Railways F class was a 2-6-0 tender engine built by the Baldwin Locomotive Works in 1885 for the New South Wales Government Railways as their K.294 class and later sold to the Commonwealth Railways becoming their F class.

== History ==
10 locomotives designed by Mr W. Scott were ordered by the NSWGR from the Baldwin Locomotive Works in 1884. They were classed as 'K' and entered service in 1885 but were found to be bad at building up steam and so were put on coal trains in the Newcastle districit. Around the same time that the Commonwealth Railways had purchased their Commonwealth Railways D class they obtained a single example of the NSWGR K class. The locomotive in question was K295 and was reclassed as the F class and numbered 55. The engine was obtained to shunt the wharf at Port Augusta. Originally the Commonwealth Railways (CR) had requested an I class (Z26 class) but K295 was the only NSWGR loco available. F55 wasn't in good condition but was needed urgently and was pushed into service at the wharf straight after being unloaded in June 1915. However F55 was unfit for the work and was taken out of service on 6 June 1916. It was then officially withdrawn in November 1921 it then stood in the scrap line for 6 years before finally being scrapped in June 1937.

== class list ==
Builder's number	Works number	Road number	In service	Withdrawn	Notes
7388		55	July 1915	November 1921	
