= New South Wales C36 class locomotive =

Class of Australian 4-6-0 locomotives

New South Wales C36 class
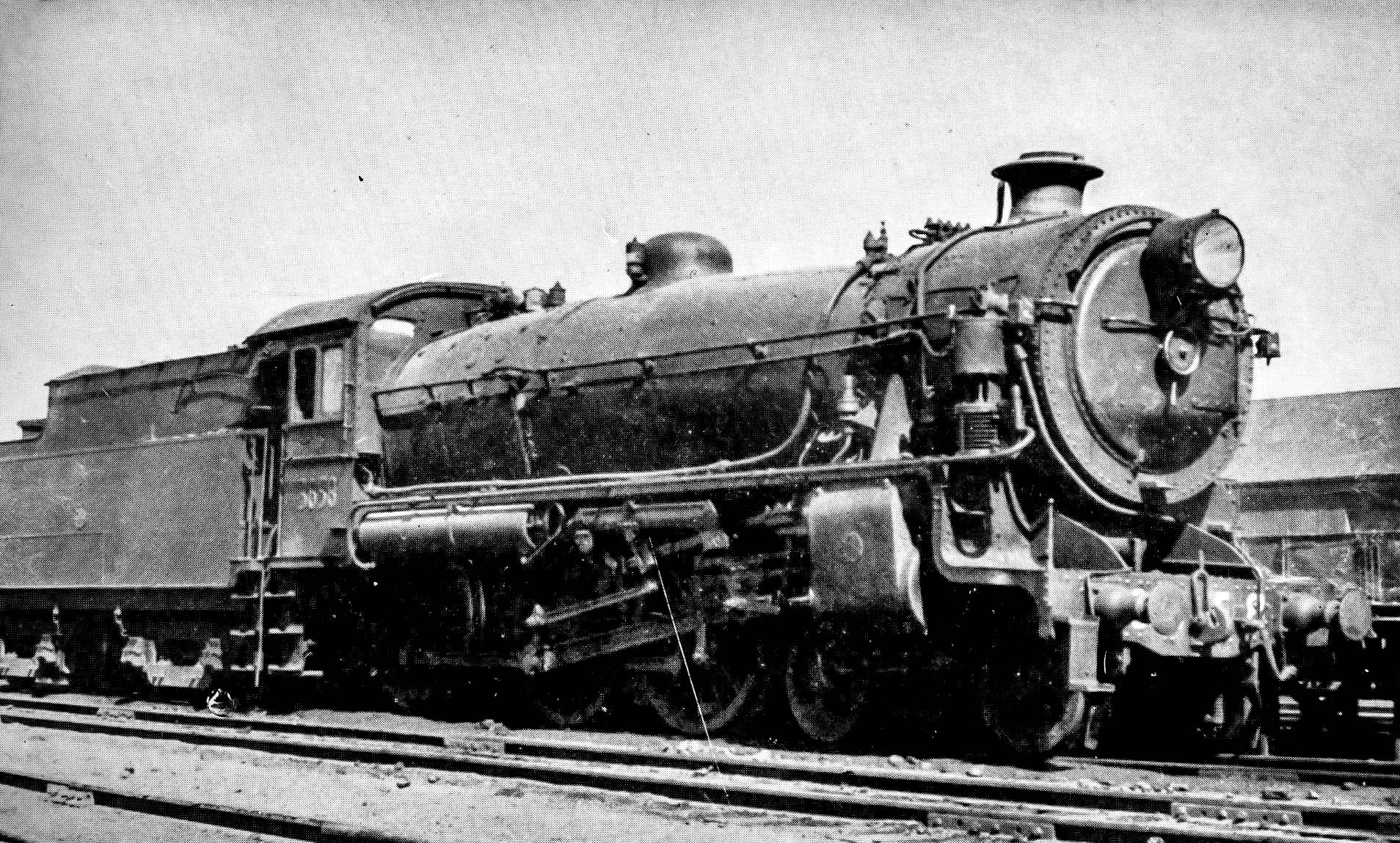
- C36 class locomotive with original round top boiler
Type and origin
- Power type: Steam
- Builder: Eveleigh Railway Workshops (10); Clyde Engineering (65)
- Build date: 1925
Specifications
- Configuration
  - Whyte: 4-6-0
  - UIC: 2′C h2
- Gauge: 4 ft 8 1/2 in (1,435 mm) standard gauge
- Driver dia.: 69 in (1,753 mm)
- Length: 67 ft 11.5 in (20.714 m)
- Axle load: original: 20.8 long tons (21.1 t; 23.3 short tons) later: 21 long tons (21.3 t; 23.5 short tons)
- Total weight: original: 159.4 long tons (162.0 t; 178.5 short tons) later: 160 long tons (162.6 t; 179.2 short tons)
- Fuel type: Coal
- Fuel capacity: 14 long tons (14.2 t; 15.7 short tons)
- Water cap.: 6,250 imp gal (7,510 US gal; 28,400 L)
- Boiler pressure: original: 180 psi (1.24 MPa) later: 200 psi (1.38 MPa)
- Cylinders: Two, outside
- Cylinder size: 23 by 26 inches (584.2 mm × 660.4 mm)
- Valve gear: Walschaerts
Performance figures
- Maximum speed: 93 miles per hour (150 km/h) (not verified)
- Tractive effort: original: 30,500 lbf (135.67 kN) later: 33,890 lbf (150.75 kN)
Career
- Operators: New South Wales Government Railways
- Class: 36 class
- Number in class: 75
- Numbers: 3601–3675
- First run: 1925
- Preserved: 3609, 3616, 3642

The New South Wales C36 class is a class of two-cylinder, simple, non-condensing, coal-fired superheated, 4-6-0 express passenger steam locomotives built by Eveleigh Railway Workshops and Clyde Engineering for the New South Wales Government Railways in Australia.

Introduced in 1925, the 75 locomotives of the class became the principal motive power for all major expresses, and accelerated long-distance passenger timetables leading to new levels of service in the pre World War II period. They were the mainstay of passenger expresses for over 20 years before the advent of the 38 class. The class was used extensively for performance testing, and thus the development and trial of a number of technical improvements.

== Origins and development ==
The 36 class was a relatively minor development of the 35 class locomotives, introduced in 1914. The first ten were built by the Eveleigh Railway Workshops, the remaining 65 by Clyde Engineering.

The design was a response to the increased loading of express trains and public demand for shorter journey times, as well as to the need for reduced servicing and lower maintenance costs.

=== Boiler ===
All were superheated from the outset. The 36 class in original form had a round-top boiler rather than the Belpaire type. In the early to mid-1950s, the majority of the class were rebuilt with new, all-steel Belpaire boilers and re-designed cabs. Typical of the technology of the day, the riveted steel boilers originally fitted to the class had copper inner fireboxes, fire-tubes and superheater flues. The replacement Belpaire boilers had steel fireboxes, tubes and flues, in line with US practice and later NSWGR policy. Although copper provides superior heat transfer, it promotes a galvanic reaction resulting in the 'wasting' by corrosion of some steel boiler components such as crown stays and front tubeplates.

=== Valve gear ===
A noteworthy feature of the class was their outside Walschaerts valve gear, by then well-established in Britain and Australia and valued for its ease of lubrication and maintenance. The 36 class was the first mainline locomotive design in New South Wales to be so fitted, and all subsequent steam classes followed suit.

== In service ==
Many of the old southern drivers claimed the 36 class were faster than the crack 38 class which arrived in later years, and were reputed to have reached speeds of over 160 kilometres per hour (99 mph).

The 36 class locomotives were placed on express passenger services, initially on the premier Newcastle Flyer trains, then later on Southern and Northern expresses and mail trains. The increased range of the class was trialled early on, with through trips from Sydney to Albury, a distance of some 400 miles, without changing the locomotive. By the late 1920s, the class were in regular use on the Melbourne Limited and Melbourne Express, generally with only four servicing stops en route.

On the Main North, they worked trains as far as Armidale and on the North Coast to South Grafton. Following the opening of the Grafton Bridge over the Clarence River, the class worked all the way to South Brisbane. When the Central West Express, Northern Tablelands Express and Riverina Express were introduced in 1941, the 36 class were rostered. By the 1950s, the 38 class had taken over all major expresses, and the 36 class were generally used on slower passenger services and mail trains, including to Kingston, Australian Capital Territory, Albury, Narrandera, Dubbo, Parkes, Thirroul, Armidale and South Brisbane and local stopping trains on the Short North to Newcastle.

Following electrification of the Main Western line to Lithgow in 1957, some 36 class locomotives were based at Lithgow, Bathurst and Parkes, and with the introduction of diesel locomotives, were relegated to freight trains although they did continue to haul the Central West Express west of Lithgow until at least 1963. As well as providing a faster service, useful for more perishable goods, the rostering of the 36 class on freight workings allowed the withdrawal of numbers of Standard Goods locomotives. Withdrawal of the 36 class commenced in January 1959 as more diesels became available, but a number were temporarily returned to traffic in late 1966, to work wheat trains after a record harvest. The last was withdrawn in September 1969.

They were nicknamed 'Pigs' by railway staff, possibly due to the 36 class locomotives' large diameter boiler and smokebox.

== Livery ==
When delivered, all of the class were painted in standard unlined black. For the 1927 Royal Tour of the Duke and Duchess of York, 3602, 3615, 3616 & 3617 were painted Royal Blue, with yellow and black lining. In 1934, to operate the Southern Highlands Express, 3633 was repainted green. Subsequently, another 28 members were also painted green.

World War Two austerity meant steam locomotives were only painted black, and as the 36 class became due for repainting, they reverted to plain black which they would carry until withdrawn. Many 36 class locomotives appeared in black with red lining at some stage. (?)

3642 is now painted green and was formerly the only operational 36 class locomotive until its retirement in 2018.

== Modifications ==
In 1957 a Giesl Oblong Ejector was fitted to 3616, replacing the blast-pipe and chimney. Six locomotives, 3638, 3642, 3644, 3651, 3652, and 3654, were fitted with Franklin Precision power reverse gears in 1964.

== Preservation ==
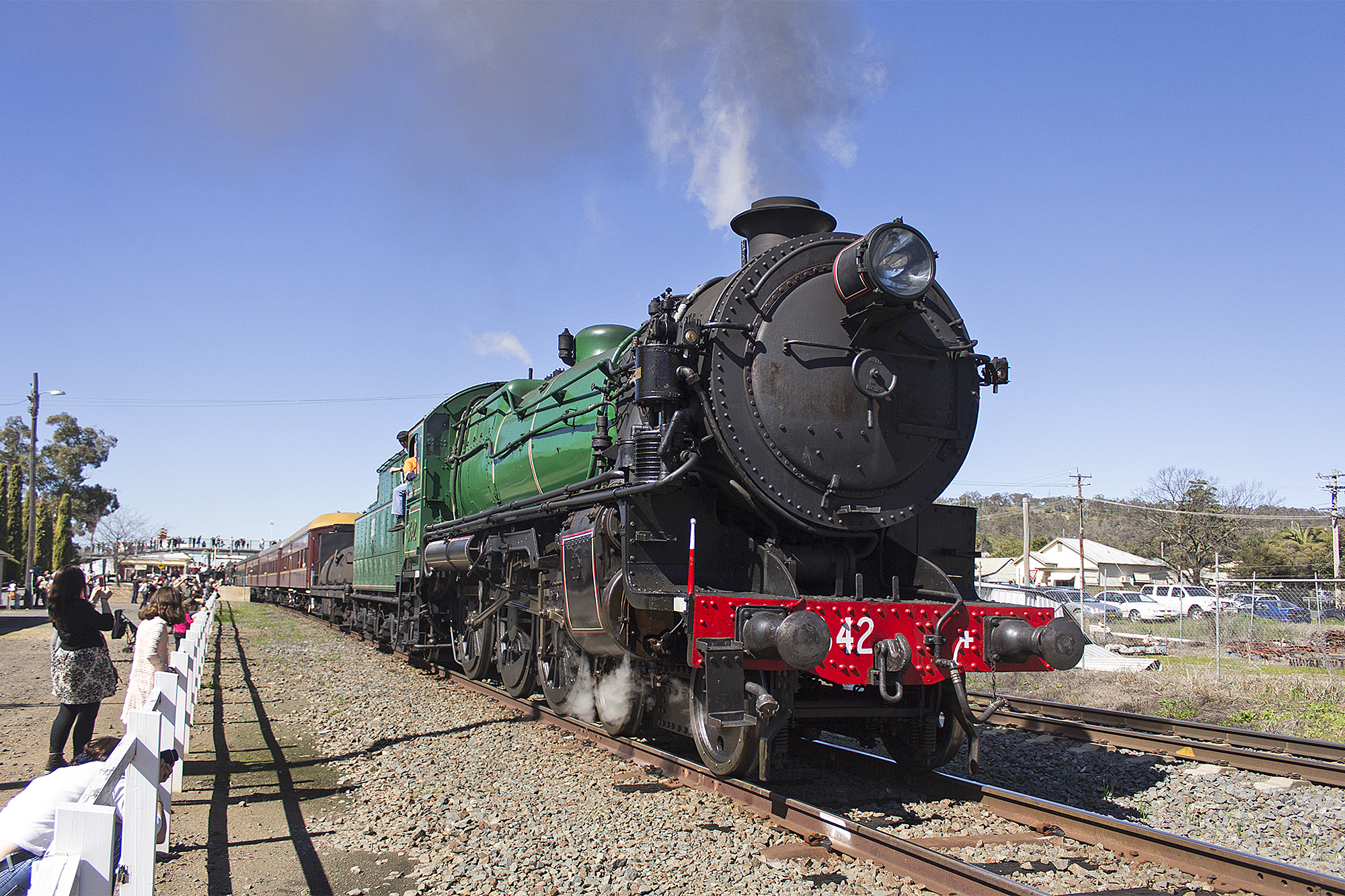
3642 was formerly the only member of the class in operational condition

Preserved C36 class locomotives
No.	Description	Manufacturer	Year	Current organisation	Location	Status	Ref
3609	4-6-0 passenger	Eveleigh Railway Workshops	1928	Transport Heritage NSW	Junee Roundhouse Railway Museum	Static display	NSW Locomotive, Steam 3609
3616	4-6-0 passenger	Clyde Engineering	1927	Transport Heritage NSW	NSW Rail Museum, Thirlmere	Stored	
3642	4-6-0 passenger	Clyde Engineering	1926	Transport Heritage NSW	NSW Rail Museum, Thirlmere	Capable of operating light engine	NSW Locomotive, Steam 3642

== Gallery ==
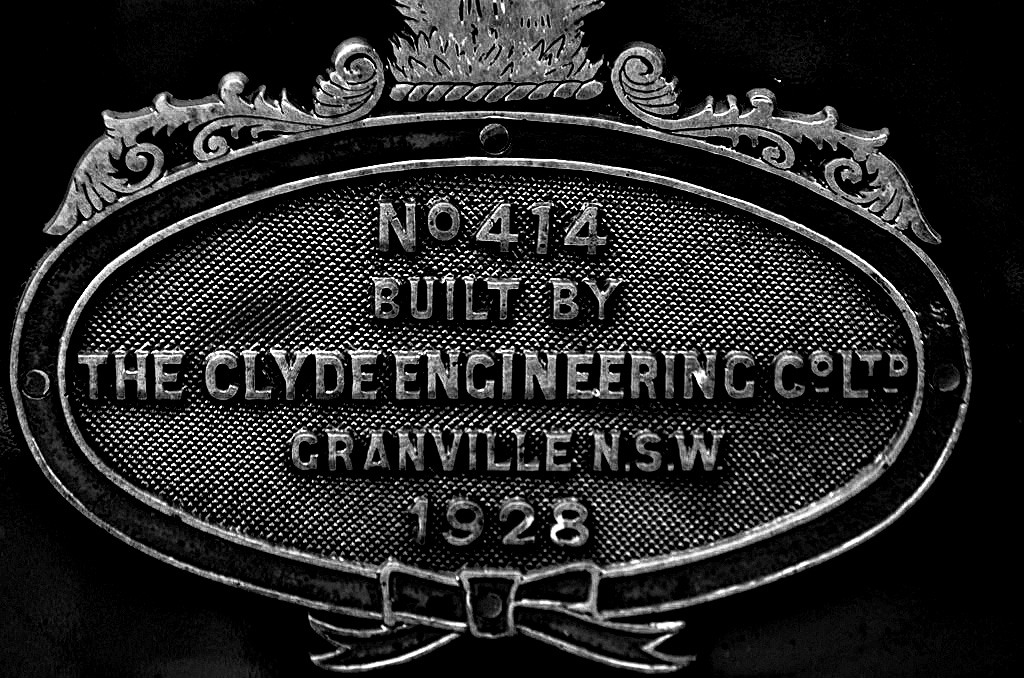
Makers plate

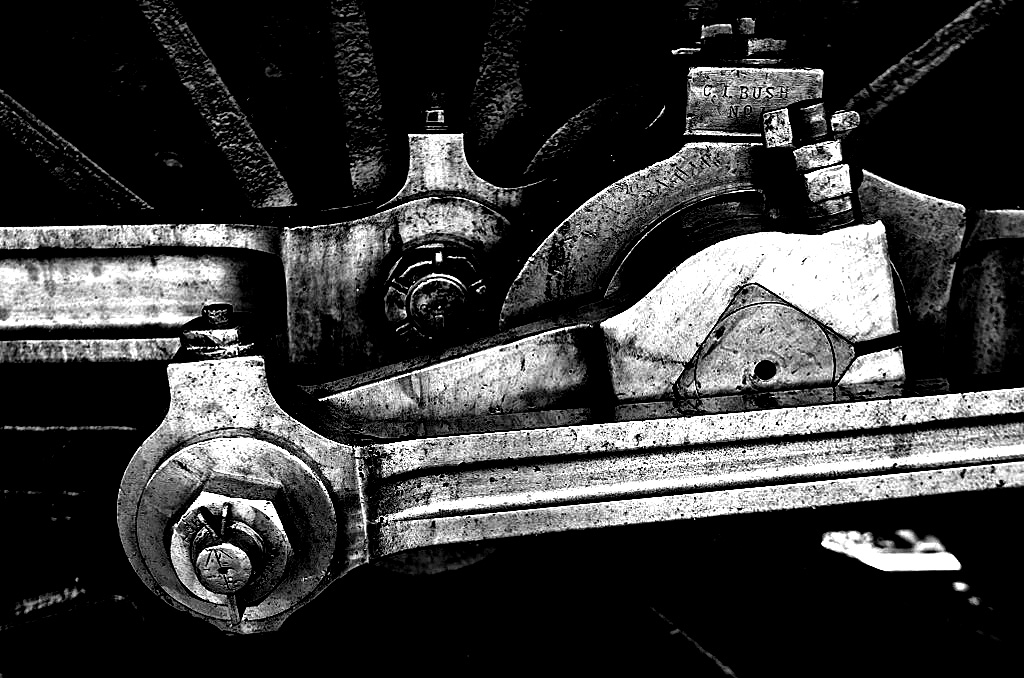
Crank

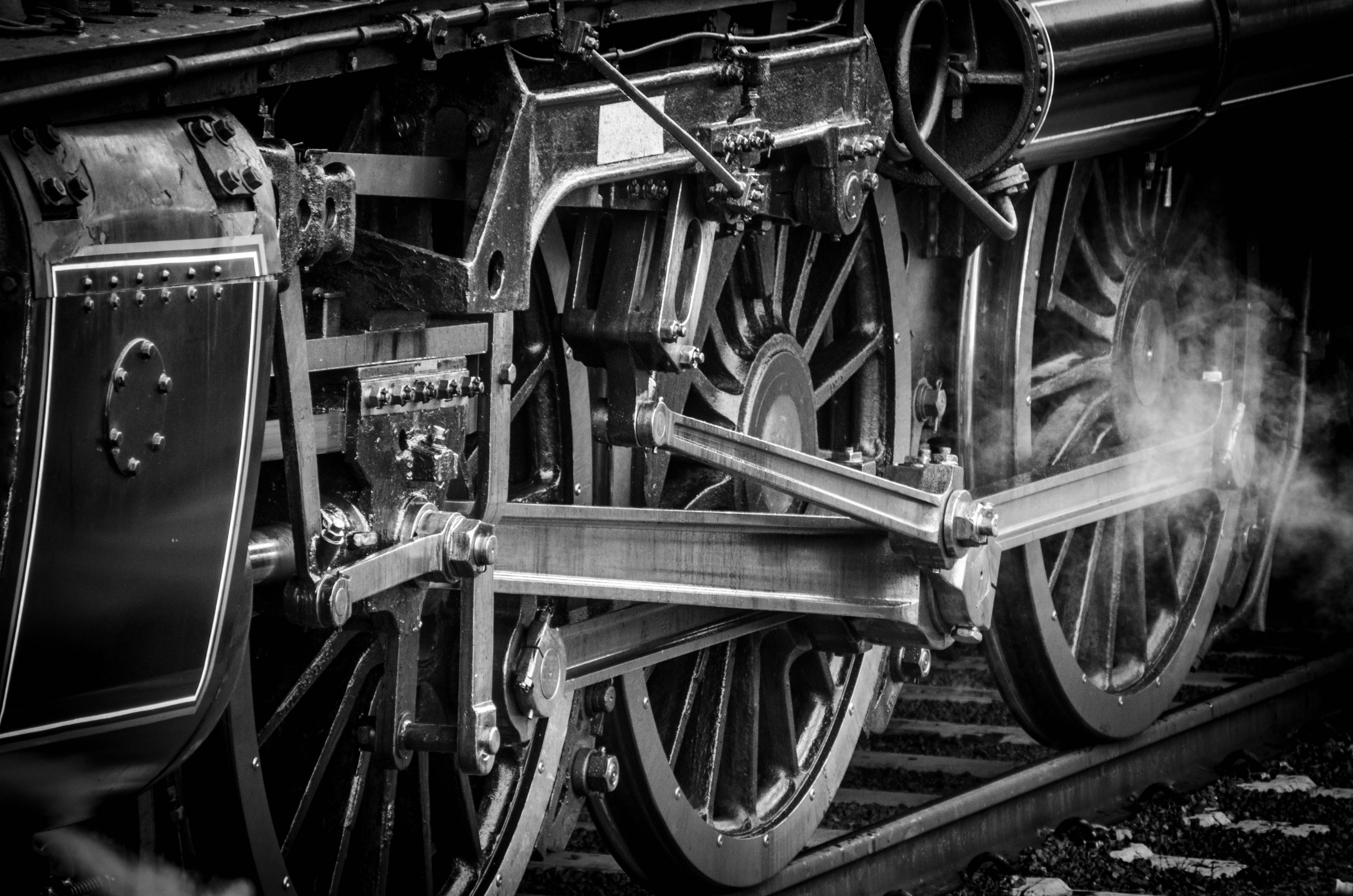
Driving Gear

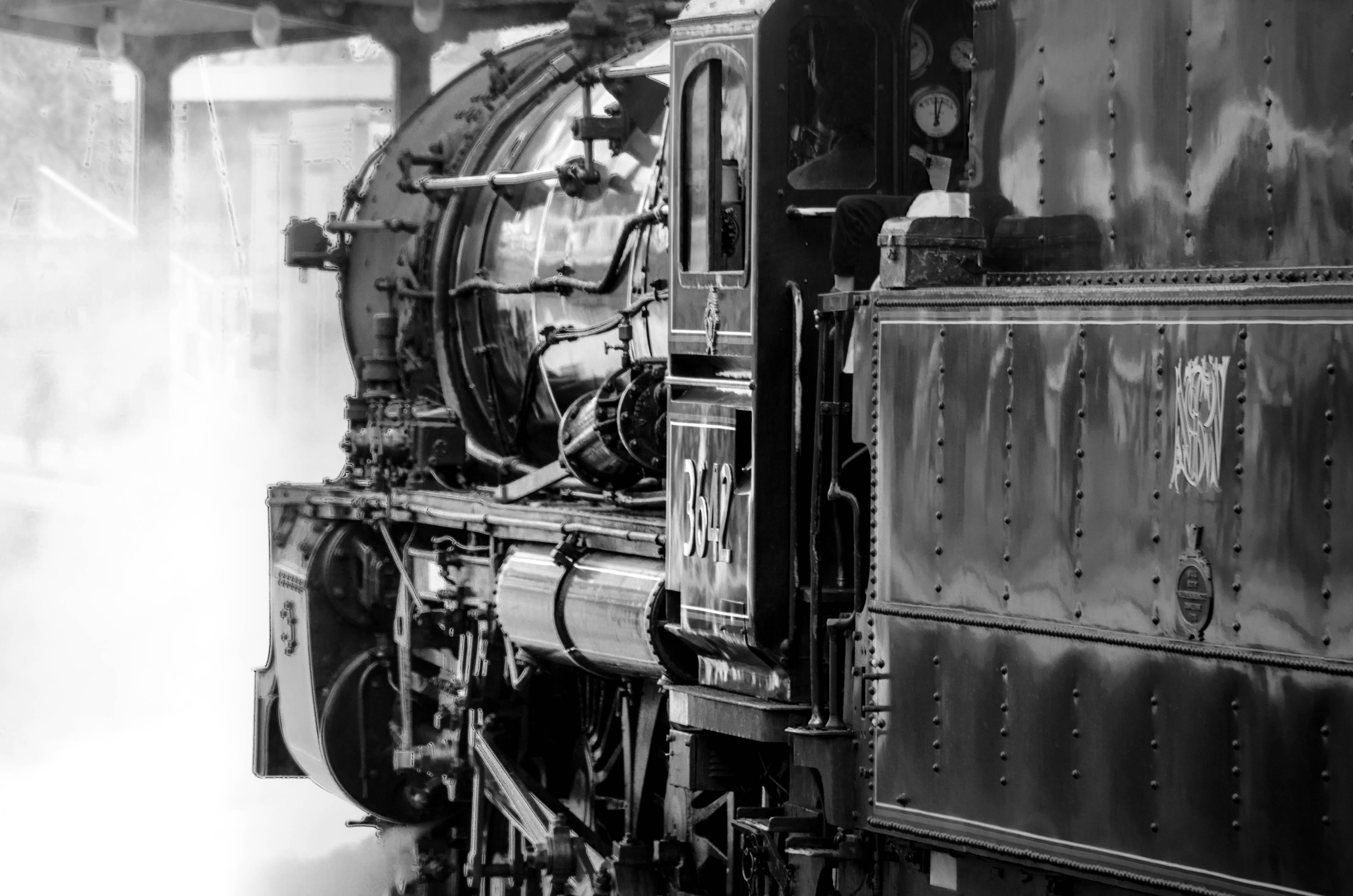
3642 at Central railway station, Sydney

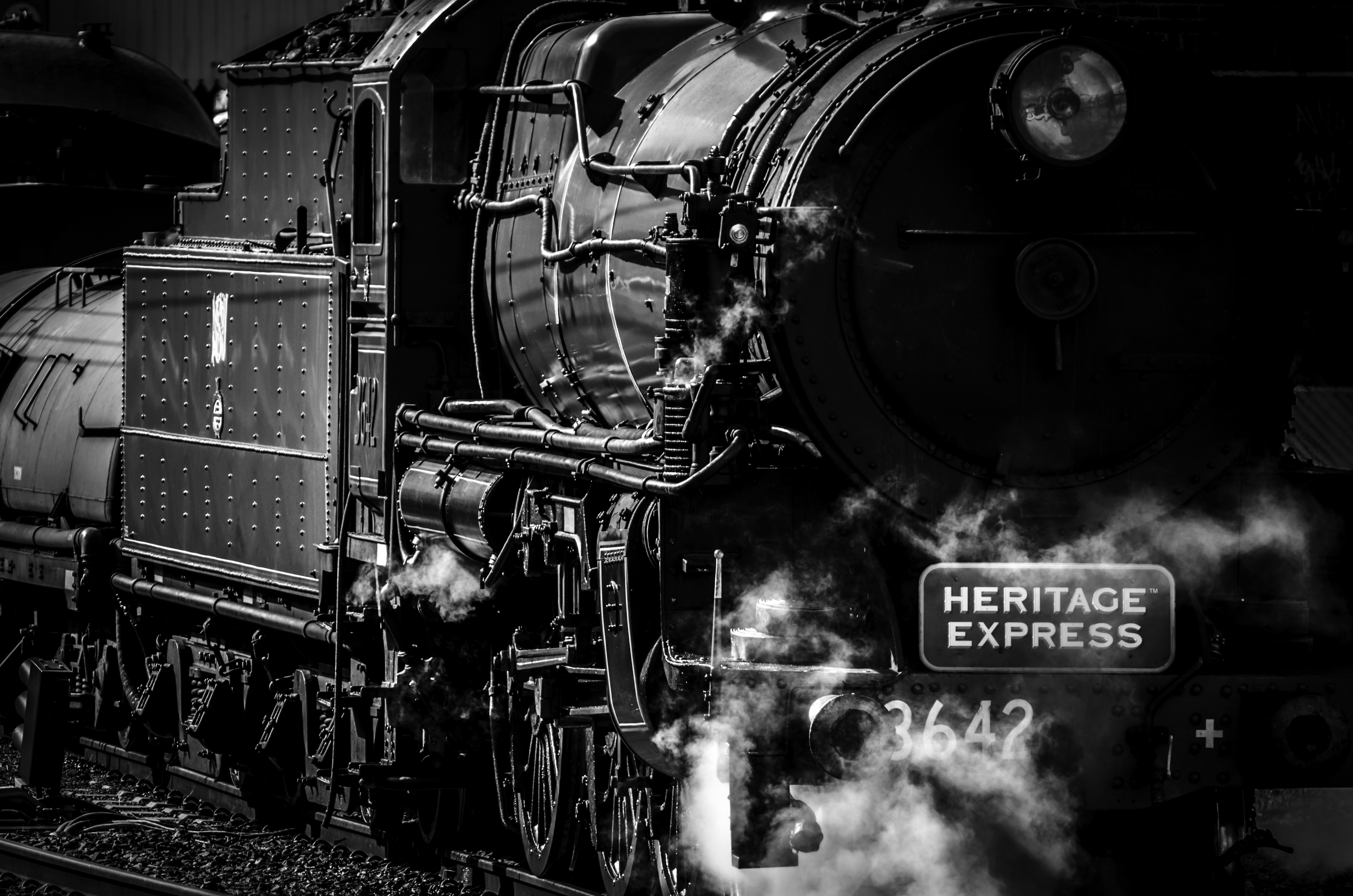
3642 at Central railway station, Sydney

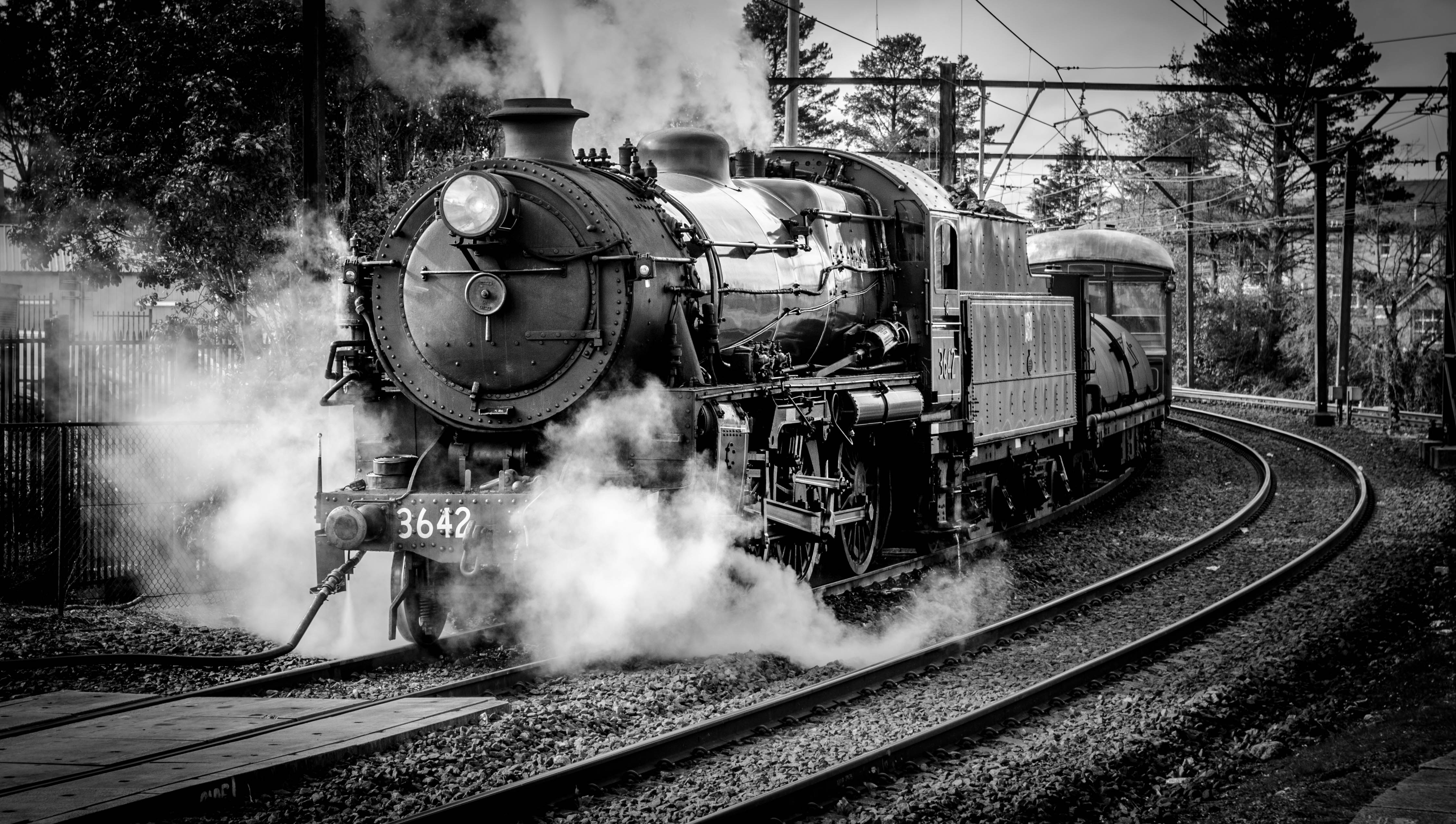
3642 at Katoomba, New South Wales

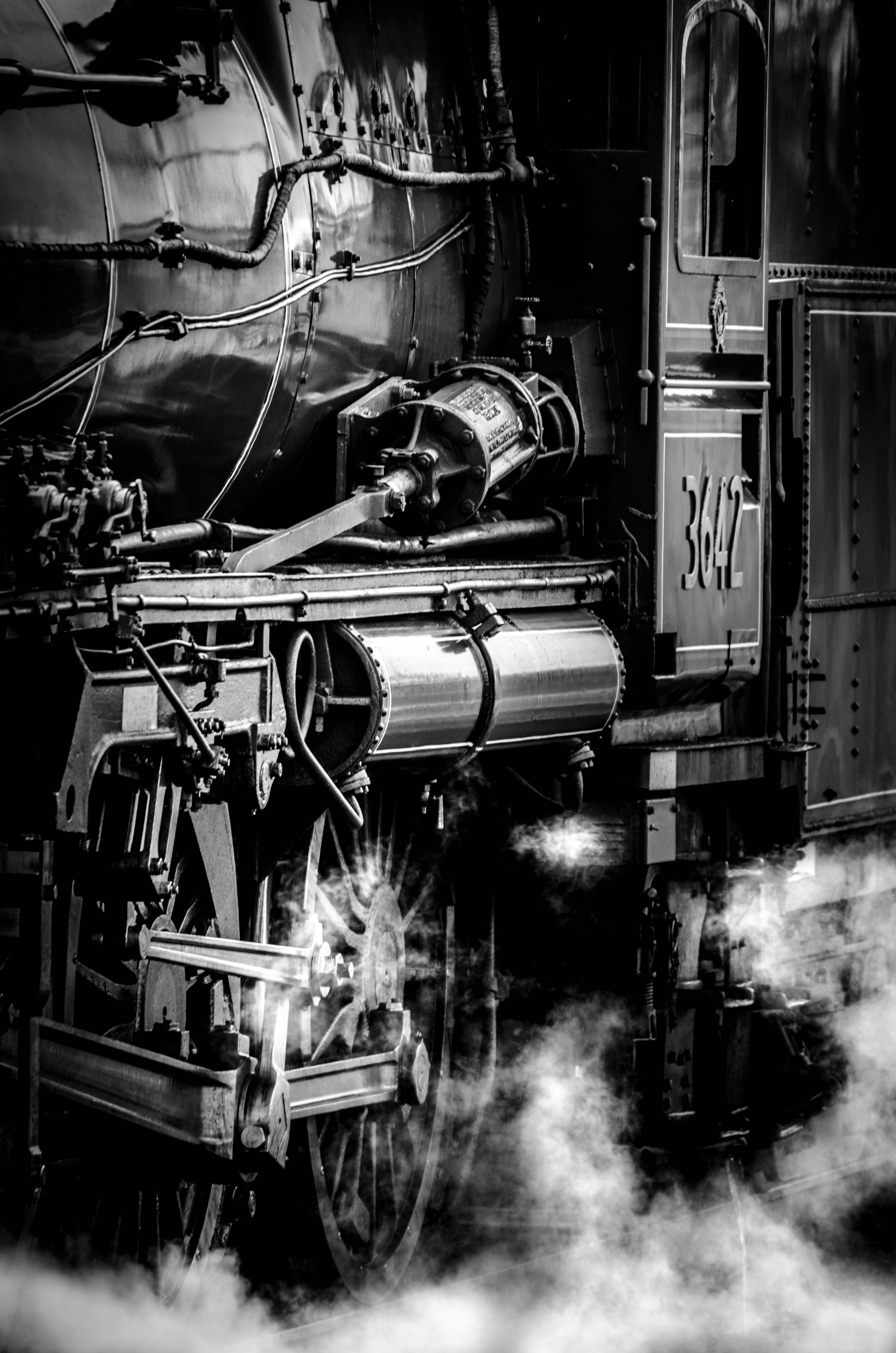
3642 at Katoomba, New South Wales

== See also ==
- NSWGR steam locomotive classification
