= New South Wales Z16 class locomotive =

Class of Australian 4-4-0 locomotives

New South Wales Z16 class
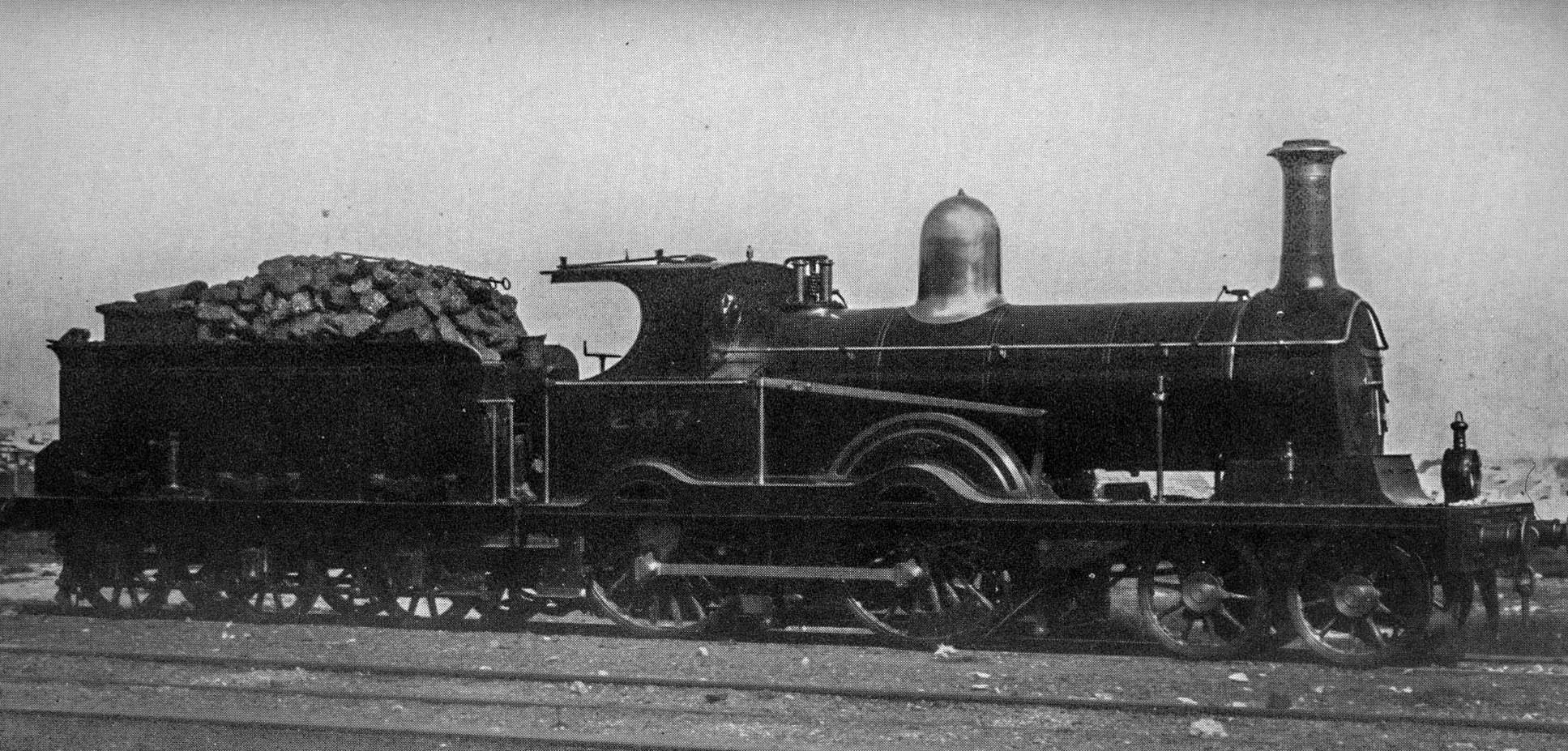
Type and origin
- Power type: Steam
- Designer: Beyer, Peacock & Company
- Builder: Dübs & Company
- Total produced: 41
Specifications
- Configuration
  - Whyte: 4-4-0
- Gauge: 4 ft 8 1/2 in (1,435 mm) standard gauge
- Driver dia.: 6'1 1/2" (D334) 6.0 1/2"(D 261)
- Boiler pressure: 140lbs
- Cylinders: 2
- Cylinder size: 18"x 26"
Performance figures
- Tractive effort: 13,100lbs (D 261) 12,800 (D334)
Career
- Operators: New South Wales Government Railways
- Disposition: All scrapped

The New South Wales Z16 class (formerly D.261 class and D.334 class) was a class of steam locomotives built for the New South Wales Government Railways in Australia.

The Z16 class were an amalgamation under the New South Wales Government Railways 1924 locomotive renumbering of two previous classes, the D261 and D334 classes. The D261 class were renumbered as 1601-1624 and the D334 class as 1625–1641.

Differences between the two varieties within the Z16 class included that the former D261 class had Stephenson valve gear while the D334 class had Joy's valve gear (both inside the frames), and (more visibly) that in the former D261 engines the front bogie wheels were a closely spaced Bissell truck while the former D334 class had its front bogie wheels in a more widely spaced Adams bogie. The class was withdrawn from 1926 to 1933. Two, 1625 and 1630, were sold to the Nepean Sand & Gravel Company, Richmond. Because the tenders had been attached to C30 class locomotives, only the locomotives were sold with the Nepean Sand & Gravel Company having to build its own.

In 1936, 1623 was overhauled for use at Chullora Railway Workshops boiler shop as a boiler tester. In January 1941 it was sent to Cardiff Locomotive Workshops for use as a stationary boiler.
