= New South Wales Z21 class locomotive =

Australian 2-6-0 locomotives

New South Wales Z21 class
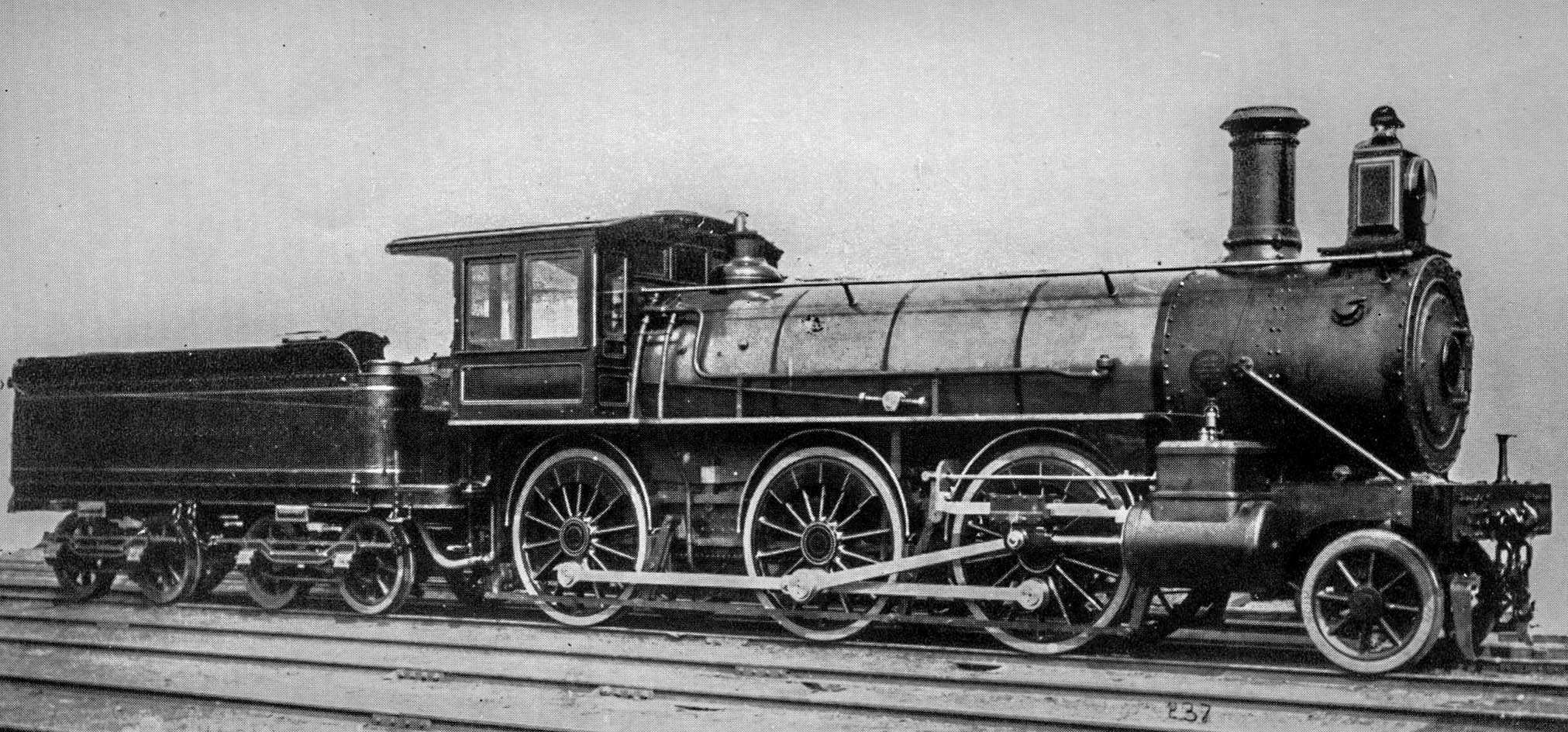
- L.304 class locomotive
Type and origin
- Power type: Steam
- Builder: Baldwin Locomotive Works
- Total produced: 10
Specifications
- Configuration
  - Whyte: 2-6-0
- Gauge: 4 ft 8 1/2 in (1,435 mm) standard gauge
- Driver dia.: 5 ft 1 in (1,549 mm)
- Boiler pressure: 140 psi (965 kPa)
- Cylinder size: 18 in × 26 in (457 mm × 660 mm)
Performance figures
- Tractive effort: 15,467 lbf (68.80 kN)
Career
- First run: March 1885
- Disposition: All scrapped by 1941

The Z21 class (formerly L.304 class) was a class of steam locomotives built for the New South Wales Government Railways in Australia.

== Wheel arrangement ==
The wheel arrangement for the Z21 class was 2-6-0. Under the Whyte notation for the classification of steam locomotives, 2-6-0 represents the wheel arrangement of two leading wheels on one axle, usually in a leading truck, six powered and coupled driving wheels on three axles and no trailing wheels. This arrangement is commonly called a Mogul.

== History ==
The last engine was scrapped in 1941.

2-6-0 Wheel arrangement. Front of locomotive to the left.

== See also ==
- NSWGR steam locomotive classification
