= Small nucleolar RNA Z17 =

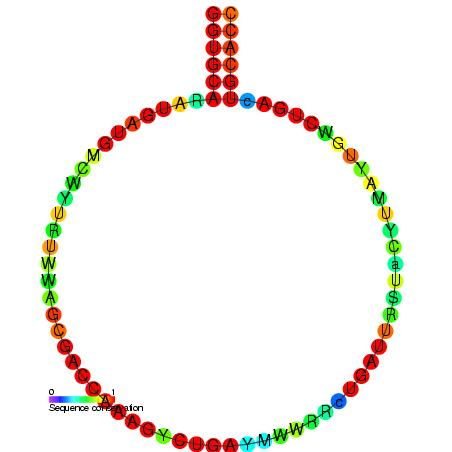
- Predicted secondary structure and sequence conservation of snoZ17

Identifiers
- Symbol: snoZ17
- Rfam: RF00266

Other data
- RNA type: Gene; snRNA; snoRNA; CD-box
- Domain: Eukaryota
- GO: GO:0006396 GO:0005730
- SO: SO:0001263
- PDB structures: PDBe

In molecular biology, snoRNA Z17 is a non-coding RNA (ncRNA) molecule which functions in the biogenesis (modification) of other small nuclear RNAs (snRNAs). This type of modifying RNA is located in the nucleolus of the eukaryotic cell which is a major site of snRNA biogenesis. It is known as a small nucleolar RNA (snoRNA) and also often referred to as a guide RNA.

snoRNA Z17 is a member of the C/D box class of snoRNAs which contain the conserved sequence motifs known as the C box (UGAUGA) and the D box (CUGA). Most of the members of the box C/D family function in directing site-specific 2'-O-methylation of substrate RNAs. snoRNA Z17B is predicted to guide the 2'-O-ribose methylation of 18S rRNA at position U121. Two forms of this snoRNA are found in the intron of the ribosomal protein L23a gene.
