= New South Wales Z29 class locomotive =

Class of Australian 2-8-0 locomotives

New South Wales Z29 class
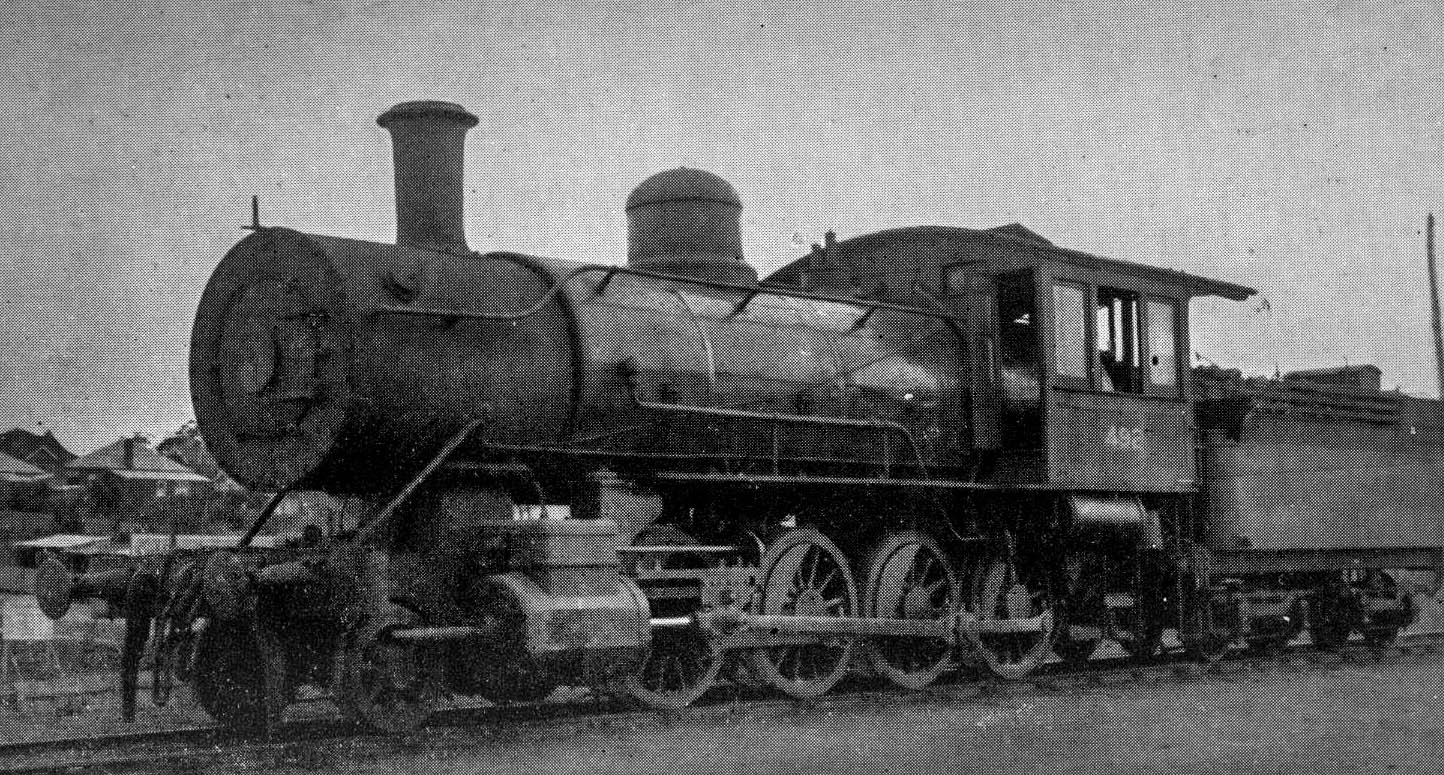
- J.483 (Z29) class locomotive
Type and origin
- Power type: Steam
- Designer: Baldwin Locomotive Works
- Builder: Baldwin Locomotive Works
- Total produced: 20
Specifications
- Configuration
  - Whyte: 2-8-0
- Gauge: 4 ft 8 1/2 in (1,435 mm) standard gauge
- Driver dia.: 4 ft 3 in (1,295 mm)
- Total weight: 100.6 long tons (112.7 short tons; 102.2 t)
- Firebox
  - Grate area: 32 sq ft (3.0 m^{2})
- Boiler pressure: 150 psi (1,034 kPa); 140 psi or 965 kPa superheated
- Cylinders: 2 (501, 502 with 4 until 1896)
- Cylinder size: 21 in × 26 in (533 mm × 660 mm) superheated 22 in × 26 in (559 mm × 660 mm)
Performance figures
- Tractive effort: 26,979 lbf (120.01 kN); 29,363 lbf (130.61 kN) superheated
Career
- Number in class: 20
- Numbers: 483-502 (1889 system); 2901-2920 (1924 system, some not renumbered)
- First run: 30 September 1891, all in service within two months
- Retired: 2918 in April 1935
- Scrapped: December 1937
- Disposition: All scrapped

The Z29 class (formerly J.483 class) was a class of steam locomotives built for the New South Wales Government Railways in Australia. They were used principally for goods transport up the steep gradients of rail track in the Blue Mountains, but also served on the Main South as far as Junee, the South Coast line as far as Waterfall and on Western lines as far as Mudgee and Wellington. Their introduction required cutting back some platforms as well as flattening their cylinder sides to achieve clearances. Over the years they lost some of their distinctive Baldwin appearance with the acquisition of standard NSWGR chimneys and smokeboxes. Unlike the contemporary O.446 class (later Z23) 4-6-0's from the same builder, the J.483 class never received a Belpaire boiler. The last two members of the class (501 and 502) were delivered as 4 cylinder Vauclain compounds. The last withdrawn was 500 (by then 2918) in April 1935, scrapped at Chullora in November 1937.

== Gallery ==
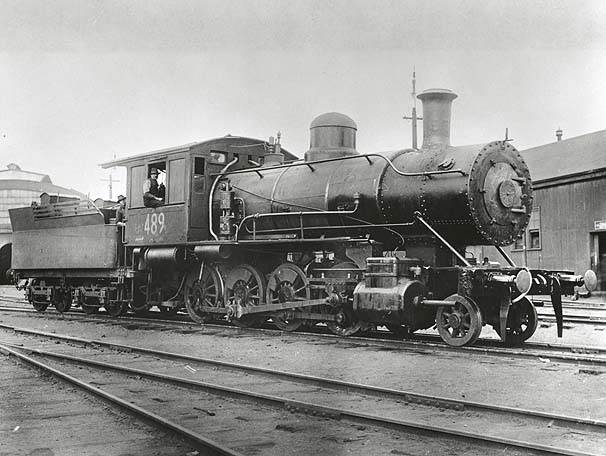
Class Z2907 (J483) locomotive

== See also ==
- NSWGR steam locomotive classification
