= New South Wales D55 class locomotive =

Class of Australian 2-8-0 locomotives

New South Wales D55 class
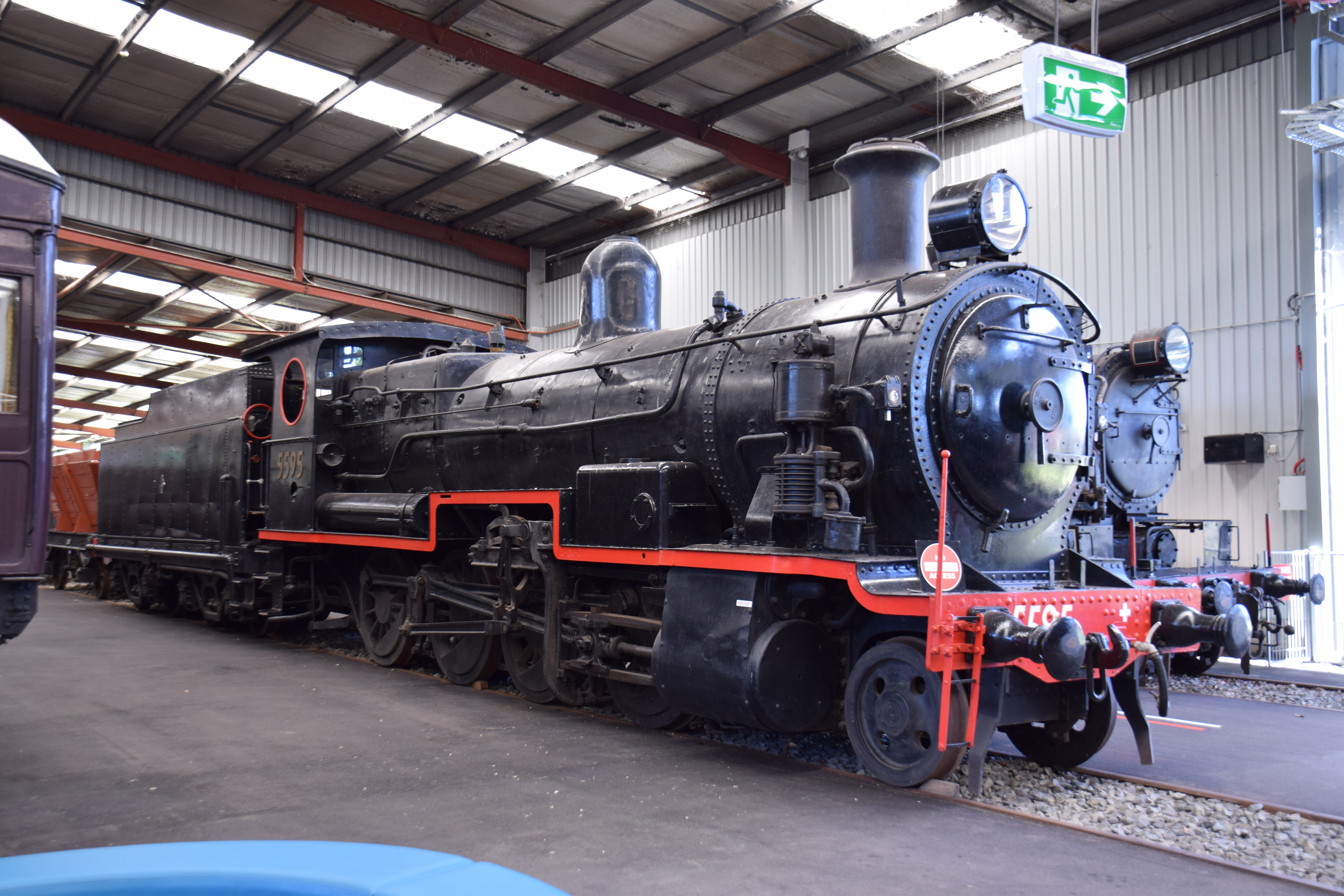
- NSWR W Thow 'Australian Standard Consolidation' class D55 2-8-0 No.5595 at the New South Wales Railway Museum, Thirlmere
Type and origin
- Power type: Steam
- Builder: Clyde Engineering, Granville
- Build date: 1918–1925
- Total produced: 120
Specifications
- Configuration
  - Whyte: 2-8-0
  - UIC: 1'Dh
- Gauge: 4 ft 8 1/2 in (1,435 mm) standard gauge
- Driver dia.: 4 ft 3 in (1,295 mm)
- Adhesive weight: 150,000 lb (68,039 kg; 68 t)
- Loco weight: 165,000 lb (74,843 kg; 75 t)
- Fuel type: Coal or oil
- Firebox
  - Grate area: 29 sq ft (2.7 m^{2})
- Boiler pressure: 160 psi (1.10 MPa)
- Heating surface: 1,755 sq ft (163.0 m^{2})
- Superheater
  - Heating area: 365 sq ft (33.9 m^{2})
- Cylinders: Two
- Cylinder size: 22 in × 26 in (559 mm × 660 mm)
- Valve gear: Southern
Performance figures
- Tractive effort: 33,557 lbf (149.3 kN)
- Factor of adh.: 4.54
Career
- Operators: New South Wales Government Railways
- Class: K1353, D55 from 1924
- Numbers: 1353–1454, 5501–5620 from 1924
- Disposition: 1 preserved, 119 scrapped

The D55 class is a class of 2-8-0 steam locomotives built by Clyde Engineering for the New South Wales Government Railways in Australia.

== Construction ==
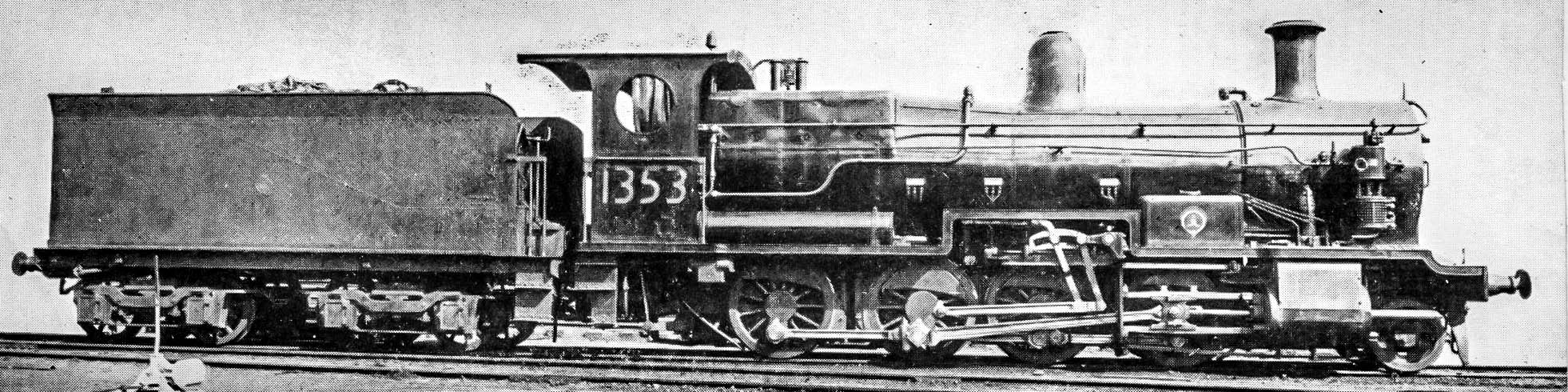
Class D55 locomotive (former K.1353 class)

In 1916, Clyde Engineering were awarded a contract for the construction of 300 K class locomotives. Following experiments with Southern type valve gear on an earlier class, Chief Mechanical Engineer Edward Lucy proposed its installation on these locomotives. The use of Southern valve gear was rare on locomotives operating outside the United States of America. Its use in this instance signaled the first NSWGR main line design with outside valve gear. The wisdom of abandoning the previously used (inside) Allan Valve Gear of the 460 otherwise closely related Standard Goods Engines in favour of (outside) Southern Valve Gear was borne out by the results, the K's (55's) averagely having much better valve events than those of their 460 ancestors, throughout their lives.

The first of the class, then classified as K1353, entered traffic on 29 November, 1918, but the NSWGR wanted to extensively test the first locomotive, so the next member did not appear for a further two years. Meanwhile, the contract had been reduced to just 120 locomotives. All were in service by March 1925 and were fitted with large capacity "Wampu" tenders. The last 30 were fitted with self-cleaning smokeboxes and outside bearings on the lead pony trucks. During World War 2, the 55 class were seriously considered for use as War Department locomotives in Iran and Iraq.

== Operations ==
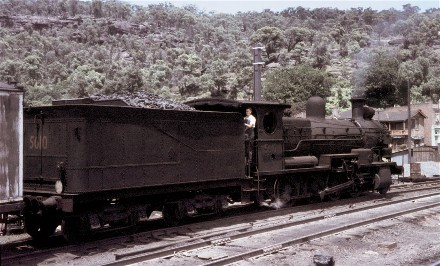
5610 stands at Hawkesbury River with a construction train for the electrification project

The members of this class spent most of their days attached to depots at Enfield, Goulburn, Harden, Junee and Cowra operating on the Illawarra and Main South lines. They were seldom used on the Main Western or Main Northern lines.

In 1946, given the contemporary discontent and industrial action in the coalfields following World War II, it was decided to convert seventy of the class to oil burners. The 55 class was chosen as, unlike the other two sub-divisions of the Standard Goods engines, the absence of eccentrics for any inside valve gear immediately adjacent to the firebox throatplate gave adequate room for the installation of the new equipment, specifically the burner and its piping immediately below the throatplate. The tenders were fitted with a 2,400-imperial-gallon (11,000 L; 2,900 US gal) fuel tank. The fuel oil was injected into the firebox by a jet of steam from the locomotive boiler, the flow being controlled by the fireman. The first six locomotives converted were fitted to burn distillate which was five times the cost of coal firing, although it was hoped that reduced servicing times would offset some of that extra cost.

When cheaper crude oil became available the locomotives were again modified to allow them to burn this heavier product. This required the installation of heating coils in the tank and pre-heating adjacent to the burner to ensure complete atomisation. A further 10 were converted in 1947, followed by another 54 in 1949. As the crisis passed, the oil burning locomotives were withdrawn as they were still four times more expensive to run than the coal-fired ones. Sixteen were converted back to coal firing and the remainder stored. The last oil burning 55 class was 5591 which was withdrawn in February 1959.

A distinctive feature of the oil burning locomotives was a hinged lid provided over the chimney to protect the boiler tubes and flues from sudden cooling when the oil fire was cut off.

Although designed to work freight trains, two were modified with specially balanced coupled wheels to operate the Cooma Mail south of Goulburn.

The last was withdrawn from Enfield Locomotive Depot in June 1967. Of the Standard Goods engines, the 55 class were thus the first to be retired.

== Preservation ==
Preserved D55 class locomotives
Number	Builder	Year	Owner	Location	Status	References
5595	Clyde Engineering	1924	Transport Heritage NSW	Thirlmere	Static Display	
