= New South Wales Z17 class locomotive =

Class of Australian 4-4-0 locomotives

New South Wales Z17 class
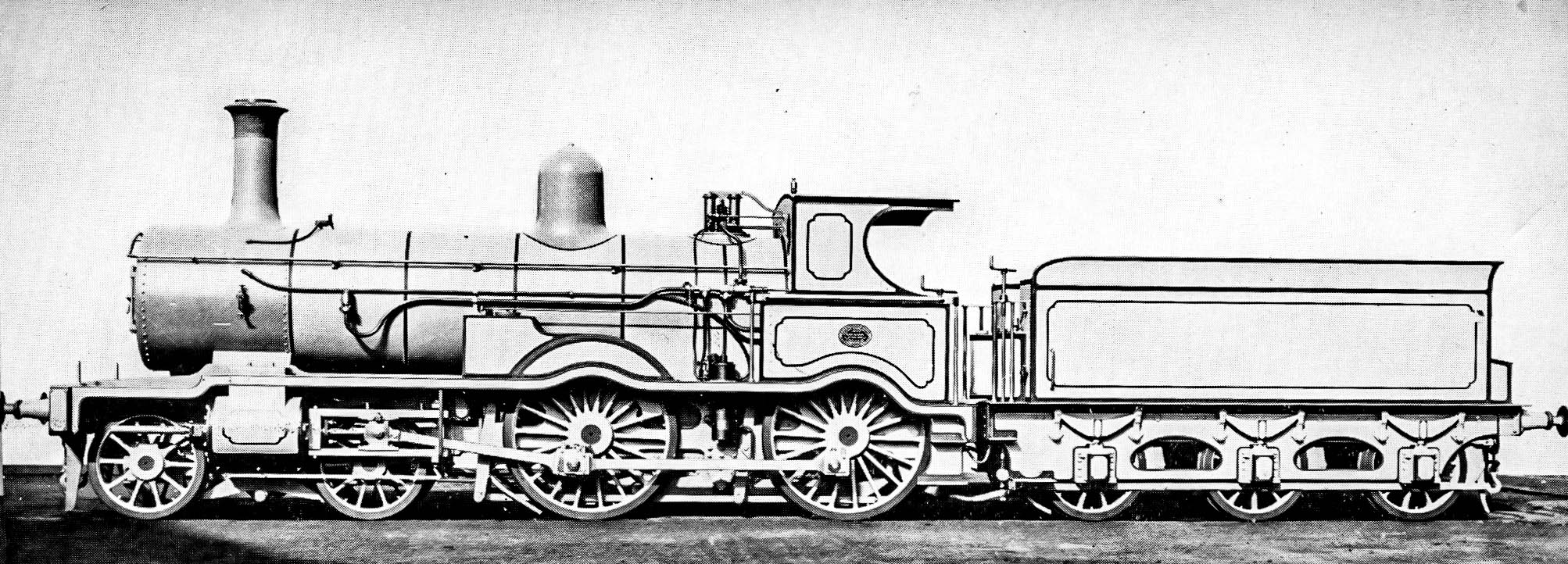
- Class Z17 locomotive in service
Type and origin
- Power type: Steam
- Builder: Vulcan Foundry
- Serial number: 1164–1175
- Build date: 1886
- Total produced: 12
Specifications
- Configuration
  - Whyte: 4-4-0
  - UIC: 2'Bn
- Gauge: 4 ft 8 1/2 in (1,435 mm) standard gauge
- Driver dia.: 5 ft 6 in (1,676 mm)
- Adhesive weight: 64,000 lb (29,030 kg)
- Loco weight: 95,000 lb (43,091 kg)
- Water cap.: 2,500 imp gal (11,365 L; 3,002 US gal)
- Firebox
  - Grate area: 20 sq ft (1.9 m^{2})
- Boiler pressure: 140 psi (970 kPa)
- Heating surface: 1,285 sq ft (119.4 m^{2})
- Superheater: None
- Cylinders: Two
- Cylinder size: 19 in × 26 in (483 mm × 660 mm)
- Train brakes: air
Performance figures
- Tractive effort: 16,920 lbf (75.3 kN)
Career
- Operators: New South Wales Government Railways
- Class: H373 (Z17 from 1924)
- Numbers: H373-H384 (1701-1712 from 1924)
- Retired: 1934–1974
- Disposition: 1 preserved, 11 scrapped

The 17 class (formally H.373 class) is a class of steam locomotive built by the Vulcan Foundry for the New South Wales Government Railways of Australia.

== History ==
Ordered from the Vulcan Foundry, 12 were placed in service in 1887. They had the 4-4-0 wheel arrangement that most locomotives had at the time. Shortly after delivery, the class leader was tested against the Baldwin Locomotive Works built L304 class to see which one could make a faster and better run across the Blue Mountains to Eskbank, with the Baldwin locomotive judged superior. They were also intended to haul passenger service on the steeply graded Sydney to Newcastle and Kiama lines.

They proved unpopular with both locomotive crews because of rough riding and track maintenance staff because of their high axle load and were displaced from mainline working and relegated to branch line work following the arrival of the P6 class (C32 class). In 1905/06, new boilers with Belpaire fireboxes were fitted, the smokeboxes shortened and the cylinder diameter reduced. In 1924, the class was renumbered becoming the Z17 class.

== Demise and Preservation ==
As they became due for reboilering, they began to be withdrawn from January 1934 with only four in service by 1948.

Preserved Z17 class locomotives
No.	Description	Manufacturer	Year	Current organisation	Location	Status	Ref
1709	4-4-0 Passenger	Vulcan Foundry	1887	Transport Heritage NSW	Thirlmere	Static	

== See also ==
- NSWGR steam locomotive classification
