= Standard Goods =

A Standard Goods locomotive is a steam locomotive designed principally for hauling goods trains, though they may at times haul passenger trains.

Examples include:

- The 0-6-0 GWR Gooch Standard Goods class, also known as the Ariadne Class, serving on the Great Western Railway from 1852 until 1892
- The 0-6-0 Armstrong Standard Goods, serving on the Great Western Railway from 1866 until 1934
- The 2-8-0 New South Wales D50 class locomotive serving from 1896 until the early 1970s
- The 2-8-0 New South Wales D53 class locomotive serving from 1912 until the early 1970s
- The 2-8-0 New South Wales D55 class locomotive serving from 1918 until the late 1960s
