= Commonwealth Railways D class =

Class of Australian 4-4-0 locomotives

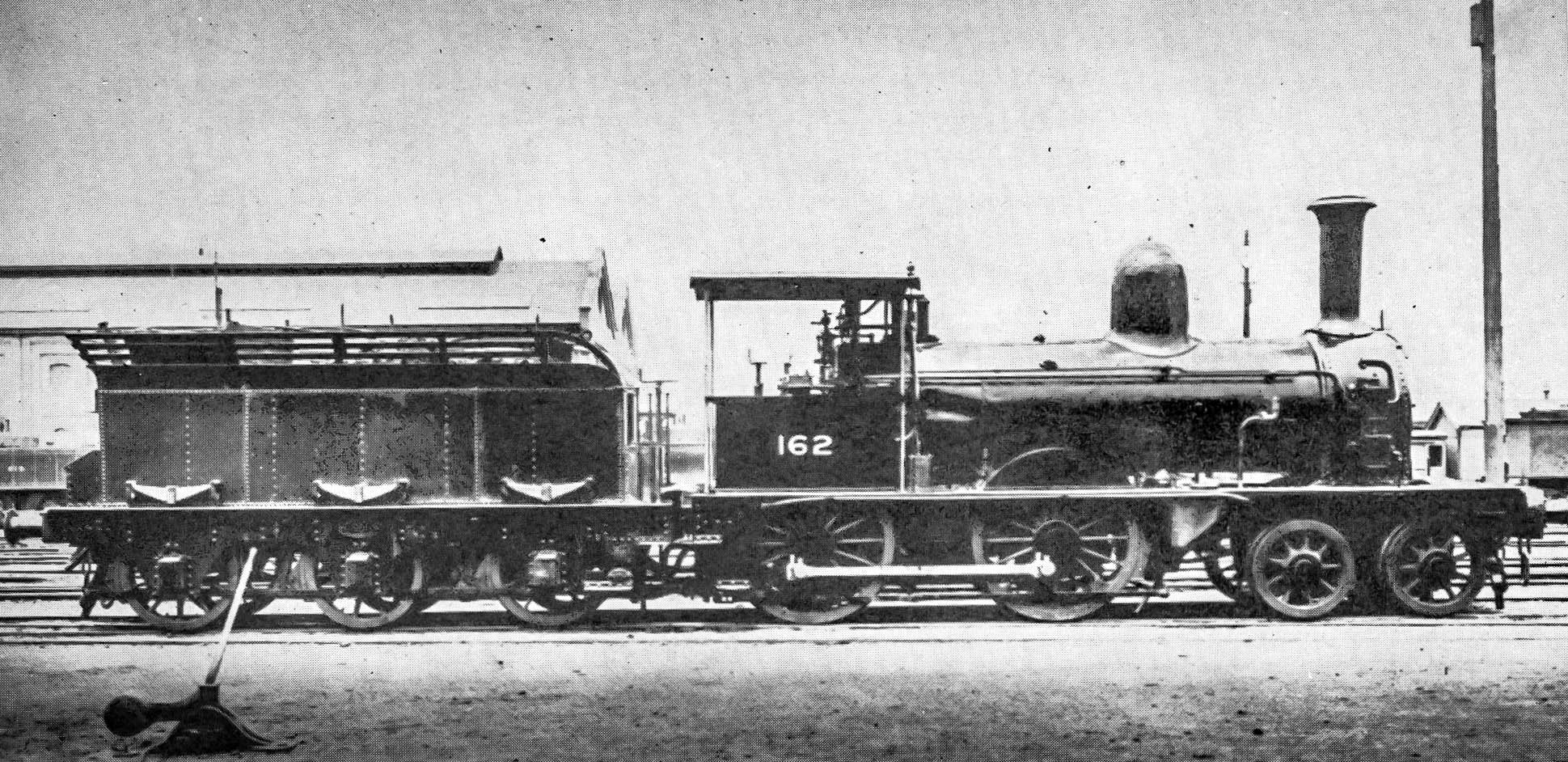
- A Commonwealth Railways D class, as a NSWGR Q.158 class in its rebuilt tender form.
Type and origin
- Power type: Steam
- Builder: Beyer, Peacock and Company
- Serial number: 1909–1914
- Build date: 1880
- Total produced: 6
- Rebuild date: 1910
Specifications
- Configuration
  - Whyte: 4-4-0T (as built); 4-4-0 (rebuilt)
  - UIC: 2′B n2
- Gauge: 4 ft 8 1/2 in (1,435 mm)
- Driver dia.: 5 ft 0 1/2 in (1,537 mm)
- Length: 46 ft 6 in (14,173 mm)
- Loco weight: 58 long tons 18 cwt (59.8 t)
- Fuel type: Coal
- Fuel capacity: 4 long tons 10 cwt (4.6 t)
- Water cap.: 2,000 imp gal (9,100 L; 2,400 US gal)
- Firebox
  - Grate area: 14.75 sq ft (1.370 m^{2})
- Boiler pressure: 150 lbf/in^{2} (1.03 MPa)
- Cylinders: Two, inside
- Cylinder size: 16 in × 24 in (406 mm × 610 mm)
- Valve gear: Stephenson
Performance figures
- Tractive effort: 12,290 lbf (54.67 kN)
Career
- Operators: New South Wales Government Railways (until 1913); Commonwealth Railways (from 1912)
- Delivered: 1880 (NSWGR); October 1912 (CR)
- Withdrawn: 1921–1943
- Scrapped: 1958–1959
- Disposition: All scrapped

The Commonwealth Railways D class were a class of 4-4-0 construction and shunting locomotives built in 1880 by Beyer, Peacock and Company originally for the New South Wales Government Railways as their Q.158 class, and later the Commonwealth Railways.

== History ==
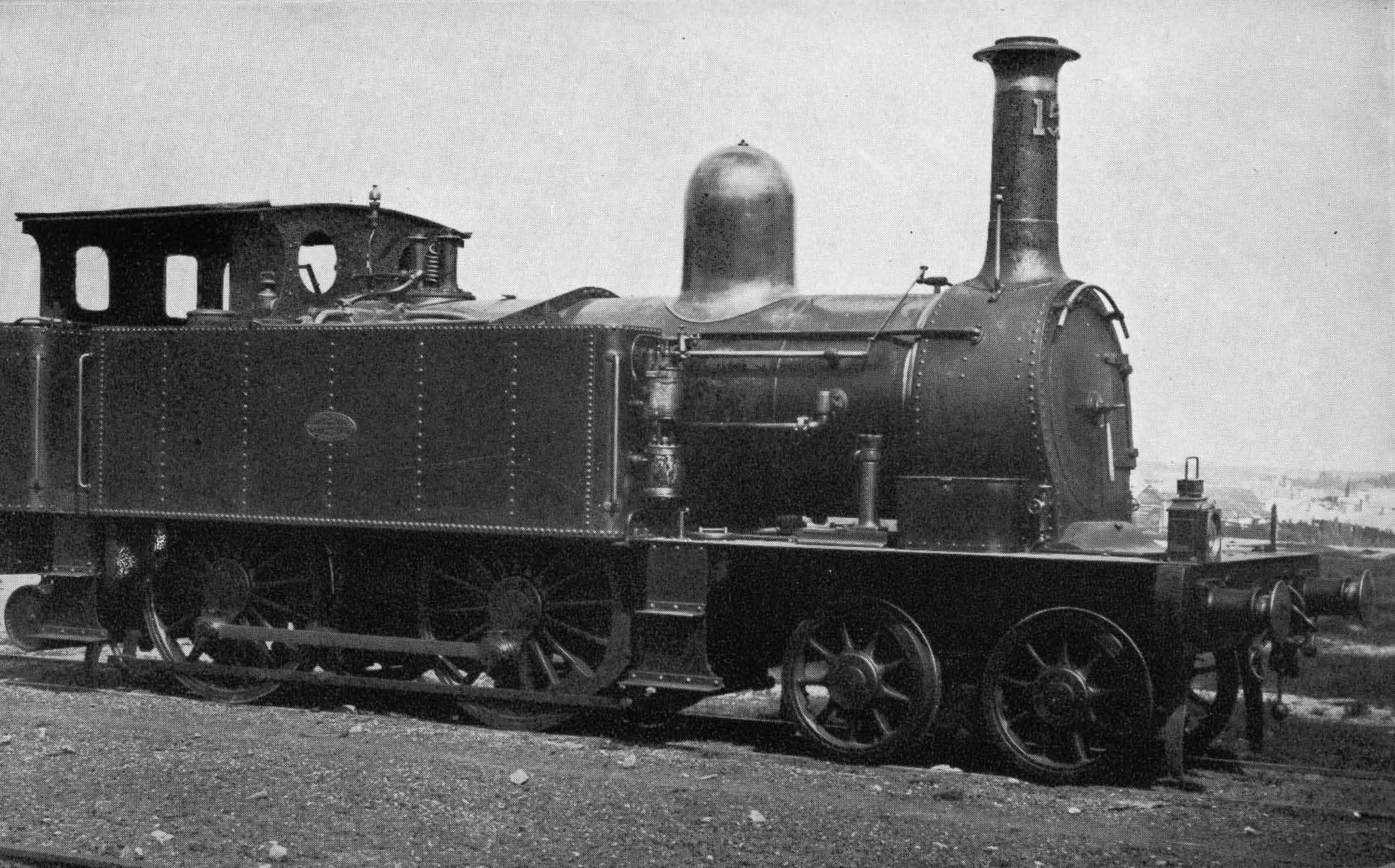
A Q.158 class in its original tank engine form.

Construction started on a new line which went from Kalgoorlie to Port Augusta; however a need for more motive power was required and so the New South Wales Government Railways started negotiating with the Commonwealth Railways. The NSWGR had introduced their Q class in 1880 originally as 4-4-0 side tank engines but due to excessive axle loads they were converted by the NSWGR into tender engines with 6 wheel tenders. There were 6 of them bought originally for suburban passenger work they were now surplus to requirements. So the Commonwealth Railways purchased 4 locomotives in October 1912 at the cost of £4,700. The remaining 2 were purchased soon after. All six locomotives were given automatic couplers prior to entering service but all retained their original NSWGR number. They were also reclassed as 'D'. In 1913 and 1914 the class had many problems with cracking gauge glasses and tubes blowing which slowed the progress of the construction of the Trans-Australian Line. Many more problems followed such as broken stays, side rod brasses, axle box brasses and the need for many of the class to be re-tubed this resulted in most of that class spending a lot of time in the workshops at Port Augusta. When the G/GA class was introduced the D class were relegated to shunting duties.

== Withdrawal ==
In the 1920s, all the D class were withdrawn but not scrapped except for D162, which was withdrawn in July 1943. The D class started being scrapped in 1958, with the last D class number 163 being scrapped on 26 March 1959.

== Class list ==
NSW / CR number	BP Works number	In service	Withdrawn	Notes
158	1909	8 July 1913	1926	
159	1910	14 June 1913	1921	
160	1911	21 April 1913	1926	
161	1912	14 June 1913	1926	
162	1913	14 June 1913	July 1943	
163	1914	6 May 1913	July 1926	
