= 1970 in rail transport =

This article lists events related to rail transport that occurred in 1970.

== Events ==
=== January events ===
- January 5 and 6 – The Erie Lackawanna's trains Nos. 5 and 6, The Lake Cities, from Hoboken to Chicago, are discontinued, ending all of the Lackawanna's long-distance passenger services.
- Reginald N. Whitman succeeds John W. Barriger III as president of the Missouri–Kansas–Texas Railroad.

=== February events ===
- February 1 – The Kennedy Extension (5.2 mi (8.4 km)) of the CTA in Chicago is put into operation between Logan Square and Jefferson Park via a subway connection and the median of the Kennedy Expressway. Six new stations are opened at Logan Square, (replacing the former 1895-built elevated stop), Belmont, Addison, Irving Park, Montrose, and Jefferson Park.
- February 1 – The Benavídez rail disaster, the worst rail accident in Argentina's history, kills 168 people.
- February 13 – The United States Interstate Commerce Commission approves the discontinuation of the California Zephyr passenger train.
- February 23 – Indian Pacific begins public operation on the new standard gauge East–west rail corridor (Australia) between Sydney Central and East Perth.

=== March events ===
- March 2 – The Great Northern Railway, Northern Pacific Railway, Chicago, Burlington and Quincy Railroad and the Spokane, Portland and Seattle Railway merge to form Burlington Northern Railroad.
- March 7 – In Kanagawa Prefecture in Japan, the Shonan Monorail opens for service between Ōfuna Station and Nishi-Kamakura Station.
- March 22 – The Western Pacific Railroad portion of the California Zephyr makes its last run.

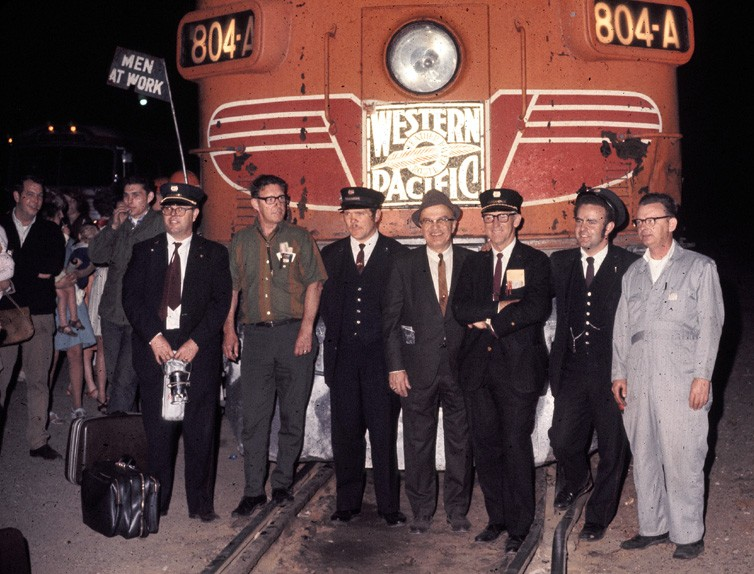
The final arrival of the California Zephyr and its crew at Oakland

- March 27 – A runaway freight train accident in icy weather which destroys the railway bridge of L'Estanguet near Accous brings about closure of the Pau–Canfranc railway line as a trans-Pyreneen route between France and Spain.

=== April events ===
- April 12 – Chicago, Burlington and Quincy Railroad discontinues its Black Hawk passenger train service between Chicago and Minneapolis–Saint Paul.
- April 27 – The first double-deck passenger cars to operate in regular service on Canadian passenger trains enter service in Montreal.
- April 30 – Canadian Pacific Railway operates its first unit train of coal destined for Japanese markets from Sparwood, British Columbia.

=== May events ===
- May 20 – The Southern Pacific Railroad (SP) relinquishes its interest in 44-mile (72 km) Tijuana and Tecate Railway Company to Mexico's national railway, Ferrocarril Sonora Baja California, S.A. de C.V.
- May 20 – The Audenshaw Junction rail accident near Guide Bridge railway station, Greater Manchester, England kills two passengers.

=== June events ===
- June 21 – Penn Central declares Section 77 bankruptcy in the largest corporate bankruptcy in United States history thus far. The trains continue to run.
- June 25 – Greater London Council's Policy and Resources committee endorses enlargement of the London Underground network by construction of a new "Fleet Line" and extension of the Piccadilly line to Heathrow Airport.
- June 28 – The Chicago Urban Transportation District is created by local referendum in downtown Chicago to finance and build the 1968 Loop and Distributor Subway project as recommended by the Chicago Central Area Transit Planning Study.

=== July events ===
- July 1 – China Railway opens Chengdu–Kunming railway, 1,085 km (674 mi) in length with 427 tunnels and 653 bridges.
- July 6 – Chicago South Shore and South Bend Railroad moves its South Bend, Indiana, passenger stop from downtown South Bend to another facility near the Bendix plant after the last train leaves the downtown terminal.

=== August events ===
- August 22 – 3801 traverses Australia from the east coast to the west coast with the Western Endeavour train.
- August 25 – Mobile and Gulf Railroad operates the last regularly scheduled steam locomotive-powered train on a common carrier railroad in North America.

=== September events ===
- September 20 – Denver and Rio Grande Western Railroad San Juan Extension between Antonito and Alamosa, Colorado, begins conversion from dual gauge to standard gauge by lifting the 3 ft (914 mm) gauge rails.

=== October events ===
- October 30 – President of the United States Richard Nixon signs into law the Rail Passenger Service Act, a bill that creates Amtrak to take over the burden of passenger train operations in America.

=== November events ===
- November – Norwegian State Railways completes electrification of Dovre Line and withdraws its last steam locomotives.

=== December events ===
- December – The Boston and Maine Corporation, operators of the Boston & Maine Railroad, declares bankruptcy.
- December 29 – Last official steam-hauled express passenger train in Australia, the 'Newcastle Flyer', hauled by New South Wales C38 class locomotive #3820.

=== Unknown date events ===
- The diesel engine manufacturing business of the former American Locomotive Company is sold to White Motor Corporation.
- Shipment of gasoline from Casper, Wyoming, the city that shipped the greatest amount in the world of gasoline by rail earlier in the 20th century, is shifted from railroad tank cars to a new pipeline.
- The New York City Subway begins removing its R1-R9 units from service.
- Historic American Engineering Record surveys the original main line of the Baltimore and Ohio Railroad.

== Deaths ==
=== April deaths ===
- April 25 – Oliver Bulleid, chief mechanical engineer of Southern Railway in Great Britain 1937–1948 (b. 1882).

=== July deaths ===
- July 4 – Harold Stirling Vanderbilt, heir to Cornelius Vanderbilt and president of the New York Central Railroad system (b. 1884).
