= 3830 =

Preserved Australian C-38 class 4-6-2 locomotive

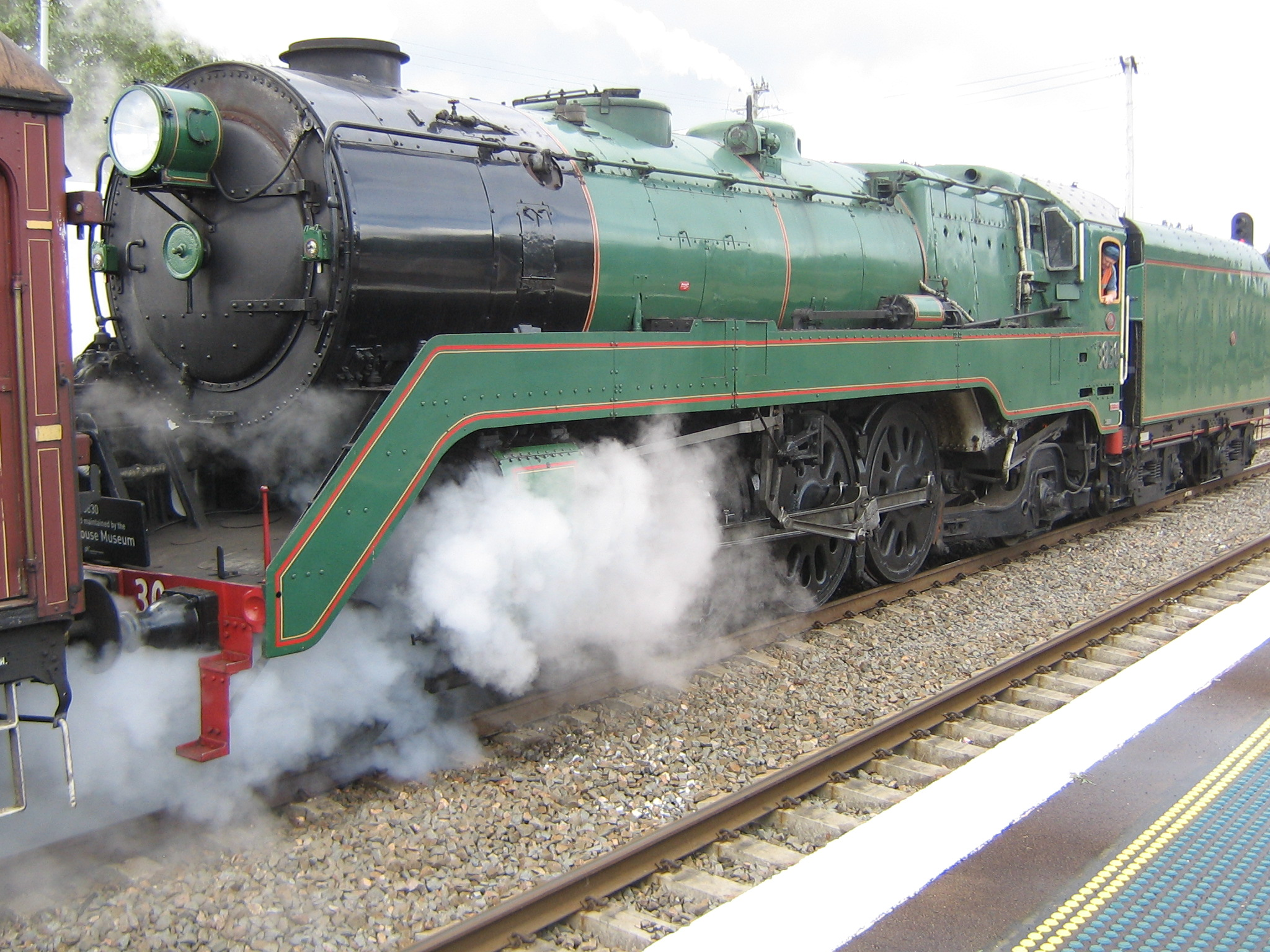
- 3830 at Maitland station in April 2008
Type and origin
- Power type: Steam
- Builder: Eveleigh Railway Workshops
- Serial number: 182
- Build date: 1949
Specifications
- Configuration
  - Whyte: 4-6-2
  - UIC: 2′C1′ h2
- Gauge: 1,435 mm (4 ft 8 1/2 in) standard gauge
- Driver dia.: 5 ft 9 in (1,753 mm)
- Wheelbase: 65 ft 7 1/8 in (19,993 mm)
- Total weight: 201 long tons (225 short tons; 204 t); 204 long tons (228 short tons; 207 t) when in steam
- Fuel type: Coal
- Fuel capacity: 14 long tons (15.7 short tons; 14.2 t)
- Water cap.: 8,100 imp gal (36,823 L; 9,728 US gal)
- Firebox
  - Grate area: 47 sq ft (4.4 m^{2})
- Boiler pressure: 245 lbf/in^{2} (1.69 MPa)
- Heating surface
  - Tubes: 142 tubes, 2 1/4 in (57.2 mm) dia each
  - Flues: 36 flues, 5 1/2 in (139.7 mm) dia each
  - Total surface: 3,367.79 sq ft (312.878 m^{2})
- Superheater: 36 element
- Cylinders: 2
- Cylinder size: 21 1/2 in × 26 in (546 mm × 660 mm)
Performance figures
- Tractive effort: 36,273 lbf (161.4 kN)
Career
- Operators: New South Wales Government Railways
- Class: 38
- Number in class: 30 of 30
- Numbers: 3830
- Locale: New South Wales, Australia
- Retired: 1967
- Restored: 1997
- Disposition: Stored

3830 (pronounced Thirty-eight thirty) is a 4-6-2 steam locomotive operated by the New South Wales Government Railways between 1949 and 1967. It has been preserved by the Powerhouse Museum and is based at the NSW Rail Museum, Thirlmere. It was operational from 1997 until 2009 and was scheduled to return to service in 2016 before the need for more extensive boiler repairs was discovered.

== Construction ==
3830 was built in 1949 by the New South Wales Government Railways', Eveleigh Railway Workshops as the last of thirty 38 class locomotives built to haul express trains. 3830 was the last steam locomotive built in New South Wales. The first five were built by Clyde Engineering to a streamlined design, whilst the later 25 locomotives in the class were built by Eveleigh and Cardiff Locomotive Workshops and were unstreamlined.

Construction was delayed mostly due to material shortages during World War II. 3830 was the last engine completed and entered service on 27 September 1949. It was allocated to Eveleigh Locomotive Depot until January 1960, before moving to Lithgow. It returned to Eveleigh in September 1960, operating from Broadmeadow between January and April 1961, before receiving its last overhaul during which it was repainted green.

In April 1962, it along with 3813 hauled the inaugural standard gauge Spirit of Progress from Albury to Sydney. In September 1966, it was reallocated to Enfield Locomotive Depot. On 22 October 1967 it made a farewell run from Sydney to Wyong on a New South Wales Rail Transport Museum special. It made its final journey on 31 October 1967 on a freight train from Moss Vale to Enfield. Over 18 years it traveled 1,700,000 kilometres (over 1,056,000 miles).

== Preservation ==
3830 was purchased by the Powerhouse Museum from the Public Transport Commission for a nominal fee of $10. It was stored with the New South Wales Rail Transport Museum collection at Enfield Locomotive Depot, being hauled to Thirlmere by 3214 in June 1975 when the museum relocated. It later moved to Eveleigh Railway Workshops.

In April 1992, some 25 years after its withdrawal from service, restoration of 3830 began when it was taken to Eveleigh Carriage Workshops for asbestos removal. The restoration was jointly undertaken by the Powerhouse Museum and 3801 Limited. The State Rail Authority and New South Wales Rail Transport Museum provided technical advice and assistance, particularly in relation to the removal of asbestos. Restoration work on the boiler and a new tender was undertaken by the Hunter Valley Training Company, Maitland. (a Federal Government's Jobskill programme, which provided training for out-of-trade apprentices). Over a 5 1/2-year period, a team of about 12 volunteers, under museum supervision, spent about 21,000 hours working on the locomotive at Eveleigh.

After operating two trial runs to Bankstown on 18 September 1997, it ran a trial to Wollongong three days later. It made its passenger debut on 3801 Limited's Cockatoo Run from Port Kembla to Moss Vale. Thirty years to the day after its farewell run to Wyong, on 22 October 1997, 3830 was recommissioned with a ceremony at the Powerhouse Museum and an official trip to Bankstown. The locomotive made its first passenger carrying journey for the public from Maitland to Sydney three days later. It then regularly hauled special trains throughout New South Wales being based at 3801 Limited's Eveleigh depot.

On 30 November 2008, 3830 was relocated to the New South Wales Rail Transport Museum, Thirlmere. It was withdrawn in July 2009 after receiving crown stay damage. In November 2013 a report into the condition of the boiler suggested the locomotive would not steam again without at least a new inner firebox and most likely a new boiler. In September 2015, the Powerhouse Museum and Transport Heritage NSW announced that 3830 would be returned to service in the second half of 2016 with the current boiler repaired. However, when the "in the frames" repair methods were deemed to be impractical and insufficient to deal with the number of firebox problems that have been discovered the repair work was halted, effectively placing its return to service on hold indefinitely. 3830 will now need a full boiler lift and extensive boiler repair work before it can be returned to service.

3830 is currently fitted with the boiler originally built for 3801 in 1943 that was given to 3830 in the mid 1950s. This boiler is notable as the first of the 38 class boilers to be built, hence it has thicker sides than the other remaining boilers
