= A Steam Train Passes =

1974 documentary film directed by David Haythornwaite

- DVD cover
- Directed by: David Haythornwaite
- Produced by: Anthony Buckley
- Starring: Chris O'Sullivan; Harold Fowler
- Cinematography: Dean Semler
- Edited by: Wayne LeClos
- Distributed by: Film Australia
- Release date: 1974
- Running time: 21 minutes
- Country: Australia
- Language: English

A Steam Train Passes is a 1974 Australian short film set in the 1940s, offers a beautifully nostalgic and imaginative exploration of legendary NSW Government Railways C38 class locomotive 3801 and its place in Australian life.

== Plot ==
The opening sequence is a 1943 black-and-white Cinesound Newsreel Monarch of the Rails showing the steam locomotive being built. The film then changes to colour and shows the locomotive at the Enfield Locomotive Depot, then the home of the New South Wales Rail Transport Museum. The fireman lights the fire, and the train driver inspects the steam locomotive. When they're all ready, the locomotive is turned on the turntable.

The main part of the film shows the train travelling through the New South Wales countryside through disparate locations including the Sydney suburbs, Hawkesbury River Railway Bridge, Ten Tunnels Deviation, Polona signal box Blayney station and the Picton-Mittagong loop line. These scenes are interspersed with vignettes of life the 1940s including a travelling salesman, a country wedding in a church at Georges Plains, and two soldiers heading off to war, having their last drink in a pub, the Hotel Alexander in Rydal. All linked in to the train journey.

There is no commentary, and most of the audio is live sound of the train, with some overlaid with original music composed by George Dreyfus. Cinematography was by Academy Award winner, Dean Semler (Dances With Wolves).

== Cast ==
There are no speaking parts so the actors are not credited at all. The only "acting" credits are for the train driver Chris O'Sullivan and fireman Sir Harold Fowler, both employees of the Public Transport Commission. Sir Cecil Barnes is the fireman in the last scenes of the film. He and the train driver in that scene are intended to be 'earlier' incarnations of the credited train driver and fireman.

== Reception ==
A Steam Train Passes is one of Film Australia's most successful films. It has won many awards and is generally regarded as Australia's finest railway film.

Awards include:

- 1974 Australian Film Institute Awards, Silver Kodak Award for Photography (Documentary Category)
- 1974 Australian Film Institute Awards, Bronze Medallion for Dean Semler
- 1975 US Industrial Film Festival, Silver Screen Award - 2nd prize, History & Biography
- 1975 Chicago International Film Festival, Certificate of Merit Documentary Section 9, History
- 1975 San Francisco International Film Festival, Special Jury Award - Communication Section
- 1975 Cork International Film Festival, Statuette of St. Fincarr, Category D. (Short Fiction)
- 1975 Melbourne International Film Festival, Special Award Short Film.
- 1975 Australian Cinematographers Society Awards, Golden Tripod.

== Film footage ==
Footage from this film has become almost stock footage for other productions requiring footage of a steam train. Footage has been used in Sarah, The Winds of Jarrah, Sirens, Rabbit-Proof Fence, True Believers, Curtin and several documentaries.

The original negative is preserved at the National Film and Sound Archive.

== Restoration ==
In 2012, the National Film Unit & Sound Archive restored and digitally remastered the film. Film Australia made it available on YouTube on 27 August of that year.

In 2024, NFUSA remastered the film in 4K resolution.
