= 3820 =

Preserved Australian C-38 class 4-6-2 locomotive

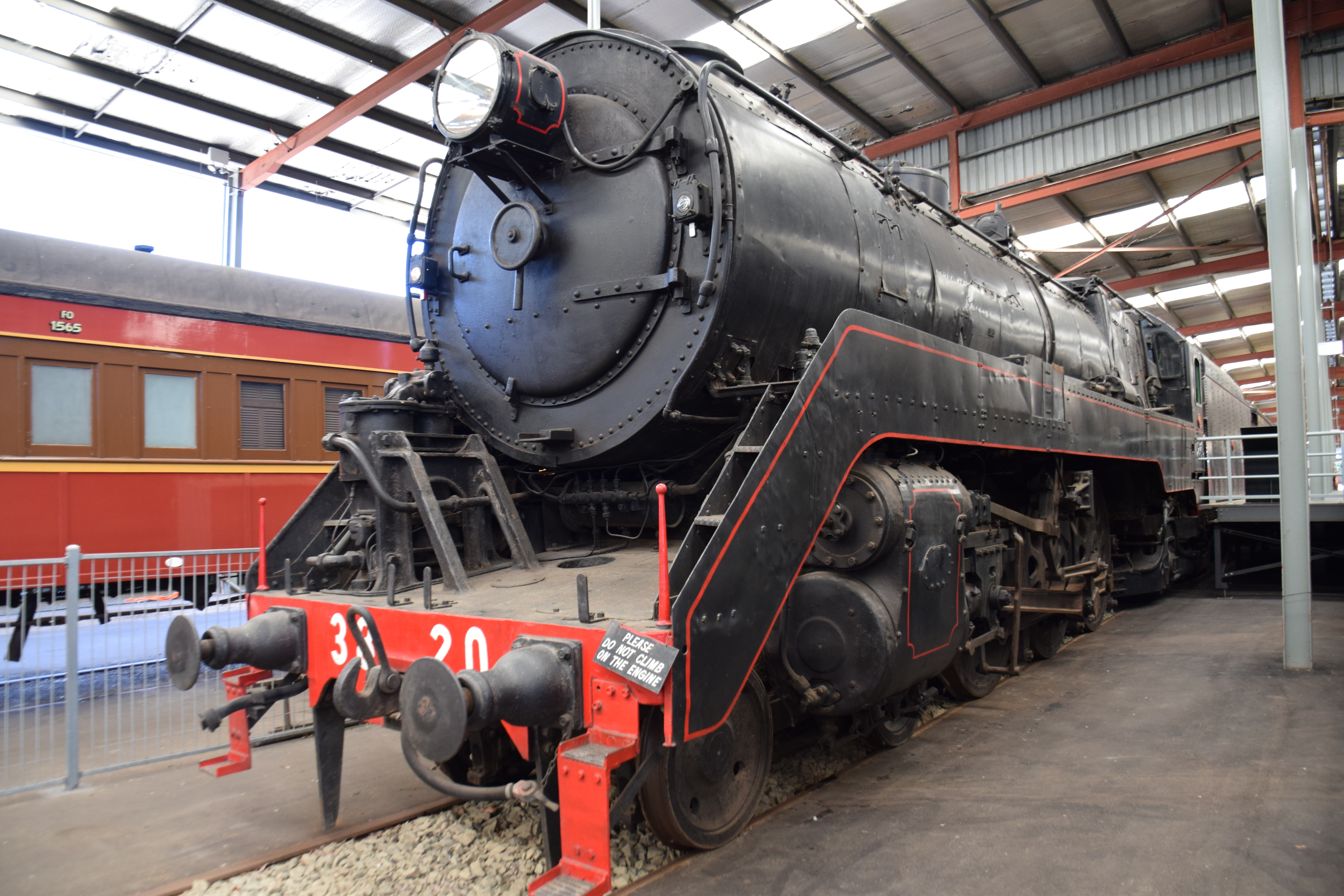
- 3820 at the NSW Rail Museum in March 2016
Type and origin
- Power type: Steam
- Builder: Eveleigh Railway Workshops
- Serial number: 172
- Build date: 1947
Specifications
- Configuration
  - Whyte: 4-6-2
- Gauge: 1,435 mm (4 ft 8 1/2 in) standard gauge
- Driver dia.: 5 ft 9 in (1,753 mm)
- Wheelbase: 65 ft 7 1/8 in (19.99 m)
- Total weight: 201 long tons (225.1 short tons; 204.2 t); 204 long tons (228.5 short tons; 207.3 t) when in steam
- Fuel type: Coal
- Fuel capacity: 14 long tons (15.68 short tons; 14.22 t)
- Water cap.: 8,100 imp gal (37,000 L; 9,700 US gal)
- Firebox
  - Grate area: 47 sq ft (4.4 m^{2})
- Boiler pressure: 245 lbf/in^{2} (1.69 MPa)
- Heating surface
  - Tubes: 142 tubes, 2 1/4 in (57.2 mm) dia each
  - Flues: 36 flues, 5 1/2 in (139.7 mm) dia each
  - Total surface: 3,367.79 sq ft (312.878 m^{2})
- Superheater: 36 element
- Cylinders: 2
- Cylinder size: 21.5 in × 26 in (546 mm × 660 mm)
- Valve gear: Walschaerts
Performance figures
- Tractive effort: 36,273 lbf (161.35 kN)
Career
- Operators: New South Wales Government Railways
- Class: 38
- Locale: New South Wales, Australia
- First run: 1947
- Last run: 1970
- Disposition: Static exhibit

3820 is a 4-6-2 steam locomotive operated by the New South Wales Government Railways between 1947 and 1970. It has been preserved by the NSW Rail Museum, Thirlmere.

== Construction ==
3820 was built in 1947 by the New South Wales Government Railways', Eveleigh Railway Workshops as the 20th of 30 38 class locomotives built to haul express trains. The first five were built by Clyde Engineering to a streamlined design, whilst the later 25 locomotives in the class were built by the NSWGR's Eveleigh and Cardiff Locomotive Workshops and were unstreamlined.

Construction was delayed mostly due to material shortages during World War II. It was at various times allocated to Eveleigh, Enfield, Lithgow and Broadmeadow locomotive depots.

During the rundown of steam operation in New South Wales, 3820 had the distinction of some lasts:

- 13 December 1968: was the last C38 class to be overhauled whilst in regular service, both being overhauled together at Cardiff Locomotive Workshops
- 29 December 1970: worked the official last steam hauled express passenger train in Australia, the Newcastle Flyer
- 29 December 1970: last 38 class in revenue service when withdrawn

== Preservation ==
Upon withdrawal, 3820 was placed in the custody of the New South Wales Rail Transport Museum and based at Enfield Locomotive Depot operating excursion trains including a journey to Melbourne with 3801, and the Last Run which it triple headed with 3203 and 3526 to Tarana on 21 April 1973 before the Public Transport Commission banned main line steam operation.

3820 was steamed on 1 January 1975, to act as a standby for 3801, which was used to haul fundraising trains for Cyclone Tracy survivors. In June 1975, it hauled 4001 and 2419 to Thirlmere when the New South Wales Rail Transport Museum relocated. It was then withdrawn. In 1980 it was hauled to Central station for display at an event commemorating 125 years of rail operations in New South Wales.

3820 is painted black with red lining whereas 3801 and 3830 wear a green livery. 3820 is considered to be of historic significance as the only remaining 38 class locomotive that remains in the same condition it was in at time of withdrawal and as such retains a significant amount of evidence for research purposes.

In May 2025, it was hauled to Chullora to have asbestos removed ahead of a cosmetic restoration.
