= New South Wales N type carriage stock =

Type of train formerly used in Australia

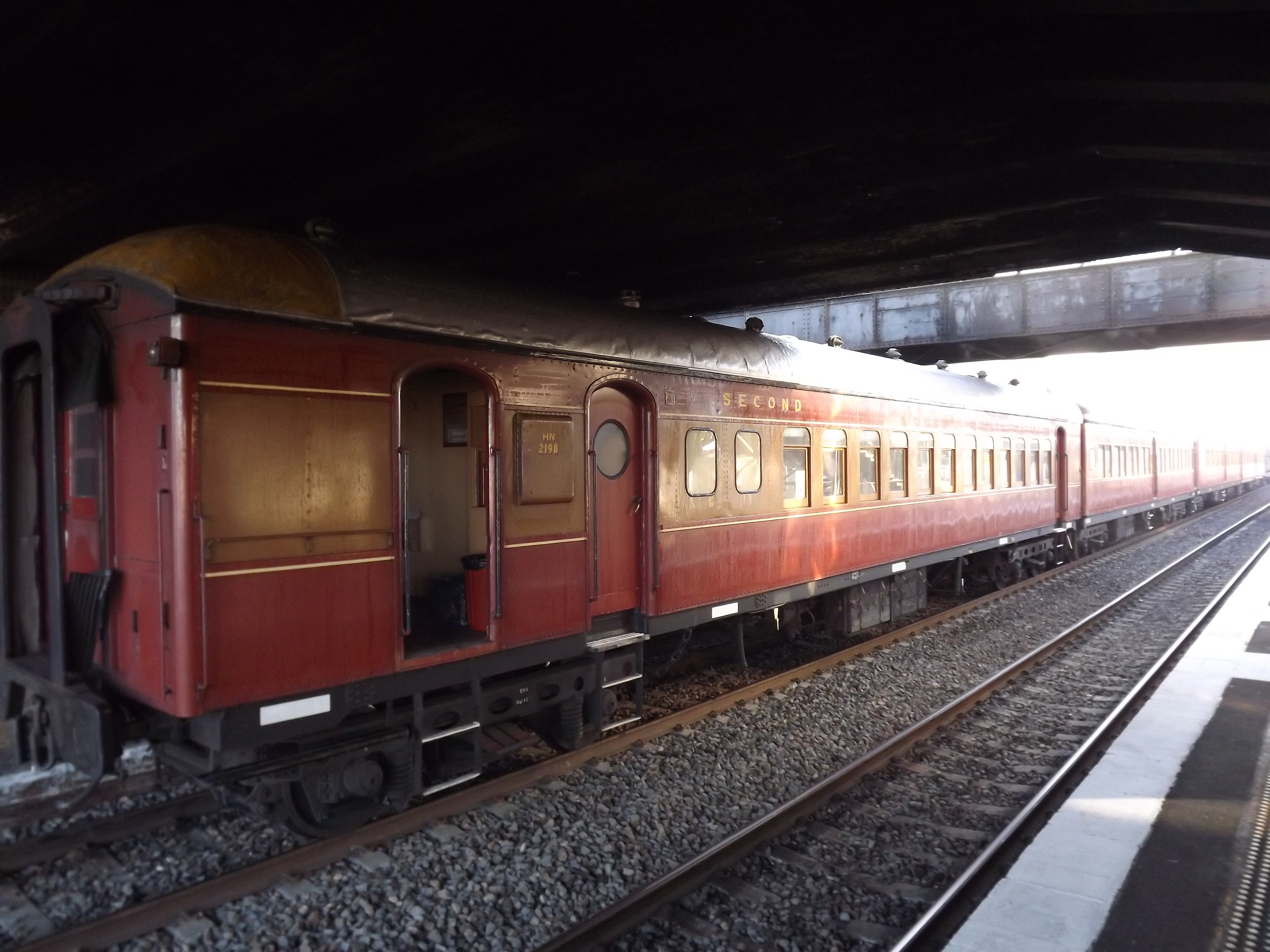
N type Car, HN 2198

The N type carriage stock was a type of steel passenger carriage operated by the Department of Railways New South Wales and its successors from 1939 until the late 1980s.

== History ==
In September 1938, the Department of Railways New South Wales awarded a contract to Waddington, Granville for 35 steel carriages. They were equipped with forced air ventilation and downward opening windows. Neither were successful and were replaced by more conventional fittings.

The cars were delivered as 5 NUB sets of seven cars, normally marshalled as HFN, FN, FN, BN, BN, FN and HFN. Car numbers were initially 2177–2211 and the cars being numbered sequentially within each set. Cars 2200–2211 were subsequently renumbered to 1738–1748 to accommodate XPT car numbering. The BN cars were first class cars and sat 56 passengers in seven semi-partitioned sections. The FN cars were second class cars and could seat 78 passengers. The HFN cars were second class brake vans and could seat 68 passengers.

In May 1944, they were placed on the Newcastle Flyer services until replaced by HUB sets from 1948. They were also used on the Cessnock Express using set NAB 113 with addition 2 FS carriages (as far as Broadmeadow) until 1963.

On 23 June 1964, set 115 was used with an additional 2 FN on Historic Newcastle Flyer record attempt with 3801 setting the new time record of 2 hr, 1 min and 50 sec.

By 1969, five cars were modified from FN to RFN to provide additional buffets for the NSWGR fleet. The modified cars were three long tons (3.36 short tons; 3.05 t) lighter and had a capacity of 47 passengers. A number were modified to BAM sleepers for use on longer distance trains which allowed retirement of a number of the older TAM type sleepers.

Over the years, they operated on both express passenger and mail train services. Some of carriages were modified and converted for their new purposes. In 1967, some were converted for use on the Brisbane via Wallangarra service which consisted of 3 carriages from set 112 and one from Set 114, This new set was WAB 130 and consisted of BAM, FNR, CN and ABN which was a spare car. WAB 130 was the only set to permanently contain a sleeper carriage. Another modification happened in June 1970 for use on the Southern Highlands Express becoming WOB 131. This was to replace R type Set 102. They were withdrawn in the late 1980s following the cessation of the Northern and Western Mails.

== Fleet Status ==
=== Original delivery sets ===
NUB Delivery Set	Original Code	HFN	FN	FN	BN	BN	FN	HFN
110	Original Number	2177	2178	2179	2180	2181	2182	2183
110	Current/last code/number			RFN			SFN	
110	Owner/Custodian	privately owned					ECHR	Privately owned
110	Location	Glenreagh	Captains Flat	Homebush Brickworks	Rothbury	Newcastle	Port Kembla	Glenreagh
110	Condition	Accommodation	Grounded Body	Destroyed by fire 1981	Scrapped 2013	Destroyed by fire 1980	Operational	Cottage
111	Original Number	2184	2185	2186	2187	2188	2189	2190
111	Current/last code/number		FNR	FRN	RFN	SCN	BAM	
111	Owner/Custodian		THNSW	ECHR	THNSW		Sydney Rail Services	Privately owned
111	Location		Eveleigh	Port Kembla	Thirlmere	Sydney Yard	Rothbury	
111	Condition		Restoration	Operational	Operational	Destroyed by fire 1981		Accommodation
112	Original Number	2191	2192	2193	2194	2195	2196	2197
112	Current/last code/number				ABN	SBN		HN
112	Owner/Custodian	Private	DSRM	NSW Govt	ECHR	ECHR	GMR	THNSW
112	Location		Dorrigo	Eveleigh	Port Kembla	Port Kembla	Glenreagh	Thirlmere
112	Condition	Shell only			Operational	Operational		Operational
113	Original Number	2198	2199	2200	2201	2202	2203	2204
113	Current/last code/number	HN		BHM 1738	RFN 1739	SCN 1740	BAM 1741	1742
113	Owner/Custodian	CRM		SSR	CRM	CRM		
113	Location	Canberra	Darling Island		Canberra	Canberra	SRS	Rothbury
113	Condition	Operational	Scrapped 1984	Operational	Operational	Operational		Scrapped
114	Original Number	2205	2206	2207	2208	2209	2210	2211
114	Current/last code/number	BAM 1743		BAM 1745		CN 1747		BAM 1748
114	Owner/Custodian			DSRM		THNSW		Private
114	Location	Rothbury	Lake Burrendong	Dorrigo	Darling Island	Thirlmere		Goulburn
114	Condition		Accommodation		Scrapped 1984	Operational	Scrapped	Operational

=== Subsequent sets formed ===
The following sets were formed exclusively of N-type carriages subsequent to the dissolution of the original delivery sets. Other sets were formed with non N-type carriages however these are not shown.

NUB115	Code	HFN	FN	FN	HFN
NUB115	Number	2200	2203	2210	2207
NUB115	Previous Sets	113	113	112	114

WAB130	Code	CN	BAM	FNR	ABN
WAB130	Number	2209	2189	2199	2194
WAB130	Previous Sets	114	111	113	112

WOB131	Code	HN	SCN	SBN	FRN	SFN	HN
WOB131	Number	2197	1740	2195	2186	2182	2198
WOB131	Previous Sets	112	113	112	111	111	113
