= Cardiff Locomotive Workshops =

Rail yard in Australia

Coordinates: 32.9366°S 151.6480°E

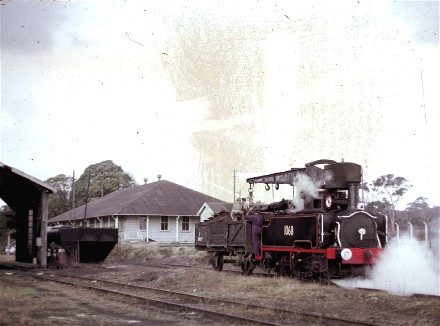
Locomotive crane 1068 shunts at the workshops in November 1982

The Cardiff Locomotive Workshops (now known as the Cardiff Maintenance Centre) is a rail yard and rolling stock facility located between Cockle Creek and Cardiff stations near Newcastle, on the Main North railway line in New South Wales, Australia.

The site is currently occupied by Downer Rail, where rolling stock is assembled, maintained and stored.

== Early northern workshops ==
The Hunter River Railway Company established meagre maintenance facilities adjacent to its line at its eastern terminus, near the current day Civic station. Civic Station is no longer in use. (All stations from Wickham to Newcastle are now served by the Newcastle Light Rail which terminates at Newcastle Beach. Opened on 17 February 2019) These formed the basis of the Honeysuckle Point Workshops the old buildings of which now lie within the area redeveloped by the Honeysuckle Development Corporation.

The workshops grew in size as the isolated Northern system developed. Even when the first Hawkesbury River Railway Bridge linked it with the Sydney in 1889, a bright future for the workshops was assured. However, by 1925 the decision had been taken to abandon Honeysuckle Point as a locomotive centre and to build a new workshop with modern facilities, on a site where greater expansion could take place.

== Establishment ==
On 15 November 1925, 127 acres of swamp land was purchased from 13,000 pounds. In November 1925, 172 acres (69.6ha) of land was purchased from the Newcastle Wallsend Coal Company and design of the new workshops began. The design was completed in time for work to start in the middle of 1926. The first sidings were connected to the main line in April, a platform for workers was in place by June and all sidings were completed by September of that year. Construction of the foundations for the buildings was well advanced by this time and erection of the steelwork started early the following year. By the end of 1927 the building work was virtually complete.

Machinery and tooling had been ordered early in 1927 and supplies began arriving throughout the year. Two 75-ton cranes were installed in the Erecting Shops. By early 1928, the first locomotives entered the facility and were under repair. The first locomotive to leave the workshops was 3364. The Annual Report of the New South Wales Government Railways to 30 June 1928, shows that by that date Cardiff Workshops had already overhauled 14 locomotives and repaired 15 boilers.

== Official opening ==
The official opening took place on 1 March 1928. By this time the facilities were fully functional. Honeysuckle Point was now a garage for Departmental motor vehicles and a permanent way workshop. A platform to serve the works was opened as Sulphide Junction.

As built, the Cardiff Workshops were a show-piece and were visited by engineers to see the form of construction and layout used. The building covered 150,725 square feet (14,000 m^{2}). Central to the shop was a traverser. The traverser lined up with five inwards roads from which locomotives could be drawn and conveyed to any of 22 pits in the two erecting shops inside. Similarly, tenders and bogies for the tender shop made their way to the two roads provided via the traverser.

Other areas within the complex included blacksmith's and spring shop; machine, fitting and wheel shops; boiler shop and copper shop. The works manager's office, which included accommodation for his assistant and other clerical staff, was situated near the main line.

== Locomotives overhauled and built new ==
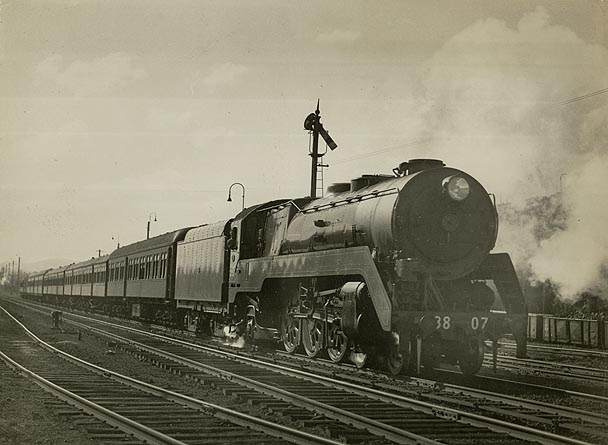
Cardiff built 3807 in Goulburn in June 1946

Initially, Cardiff Workshops took in locomotives used in the Newcastle district which included such classes as 30 class passenger tanks and 19, 24 and 26 classes used in coal haulage. Subsequently, the overhaul of the steam fleet was placed on a more formal basis and each of the three large workshops, Eveleigh, Chullora and Cardiff, each assumed a number of locomotive classes for each to overhaul. To Cardiff came the 34 and 35 passenger classes and the 53 and 55 freight classes.

Cardiff built the 12 odd number non-streamlined 38 class locomotives (3807–3829) between February 1946 and August 1949.

The order for the 58 class freight locomotives was also undertaken by NSWGR workshops. Cardiff built 5807 and 5813 with the latter the last steam locomotive to be built in a NSWGR workshop.

== The war effort ==
The hostilities of World War II imposed a heavy load on the industrial resources of Australia and most railway workshops were asked to play a part in the war effort. Cardiff was no exception. A large ammunition factory was built at Rutherford and many dies, tools and jigs were required for that facility. As a consequence, a Tool Room was built as an extension of the Smith and Machine Shops. At this time, the total staff employed at Cardiff was approximately 1,200.

== Beyer Garratts ==
In 1952, the 60 class Garratt locomotives entered service and facilities for their overhaul became a problem. Cardiff was selected to handle the overhauls, but the length of the locomotives at 109 feet (33.22 m) posed a problem as they were not going to fit on the traverser. The solution was found in partially filling in the traverser and lifting the locomotives into position with the overhead cranes.

== Diesel era ==
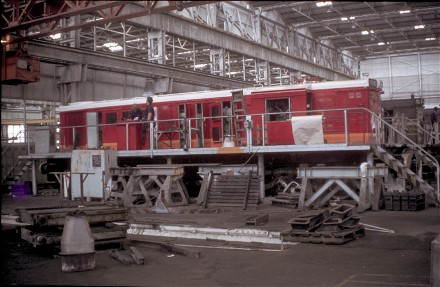
Diesel locos under repair in the 1980s

For several years, both diesel and steam locomotives were handled at Cardiff, but as initial numbers were not excessive, they were handled without too many problems. When steam locomotives ceased being overhauled in from 1970, a reorganisation was able to proceed.

An electrical fitting shop replaced the copper shop. The diesel engines were maintained where once boilers stood. Bogies were serviced and traction motors assembled on to wheels where the traverser once operated. The erecting shops retained that identity, but with additional platforms to enable work to be carried out at levels above the floor of the shops.

In 1986, control of Cardiff passed from the Workshop Branch to the Mechanical Branch and it became home depot to the 48 class fleet. This saw the traverser filled in for the Garratts in the 1950s reopened. A wagon repair section was also established. In April 1989, it became a locomotive running depot.

== Closure ==
Two changes brought about the decline of the Cardiff Maintenance Centre, the name it adopted in March 1987. The first was the decision to maintain all wagons at a One Spot facility, a centre where freight rolling stock could receive all its necessary maintenance at one location. From April 1993 the wagon work was transferred to Port Waratah One Spot facility.

Locomotive work continued, but the second change soon followed. This was to hire a new fleet of locomotives under a Power by the Hour or ReadyPower agreement. Clyde Engineering was awarded the contract and constructed a depot on Kooragang Island to service the 82 and 90 class locomotives. Many older locomotives were retired with the last locomotives departing Cardiff Workshops in December 1993 with the gates closed on 7 January 1994.

As members of the 44, 442 and 45 classes were replaced by the new arrivals they were brought to Cardiff for store before being auctioned with 81 present in October 1994.

From 1994 to 1998, Cardiff was used as a worksite for the fitting of radios to all locomotives.

== Downer Rail ==
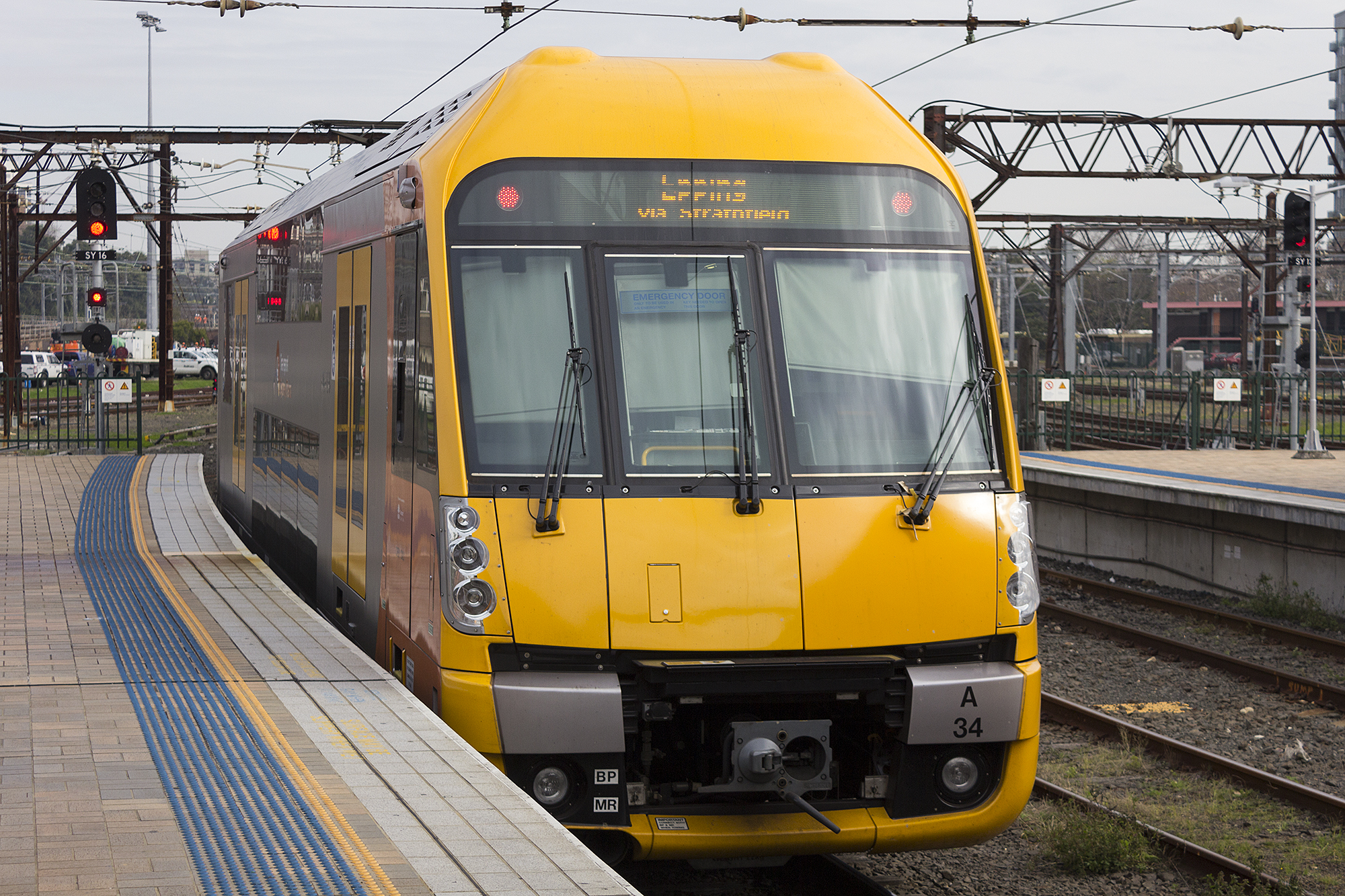
Sydney Trains A set at Central in July 2013

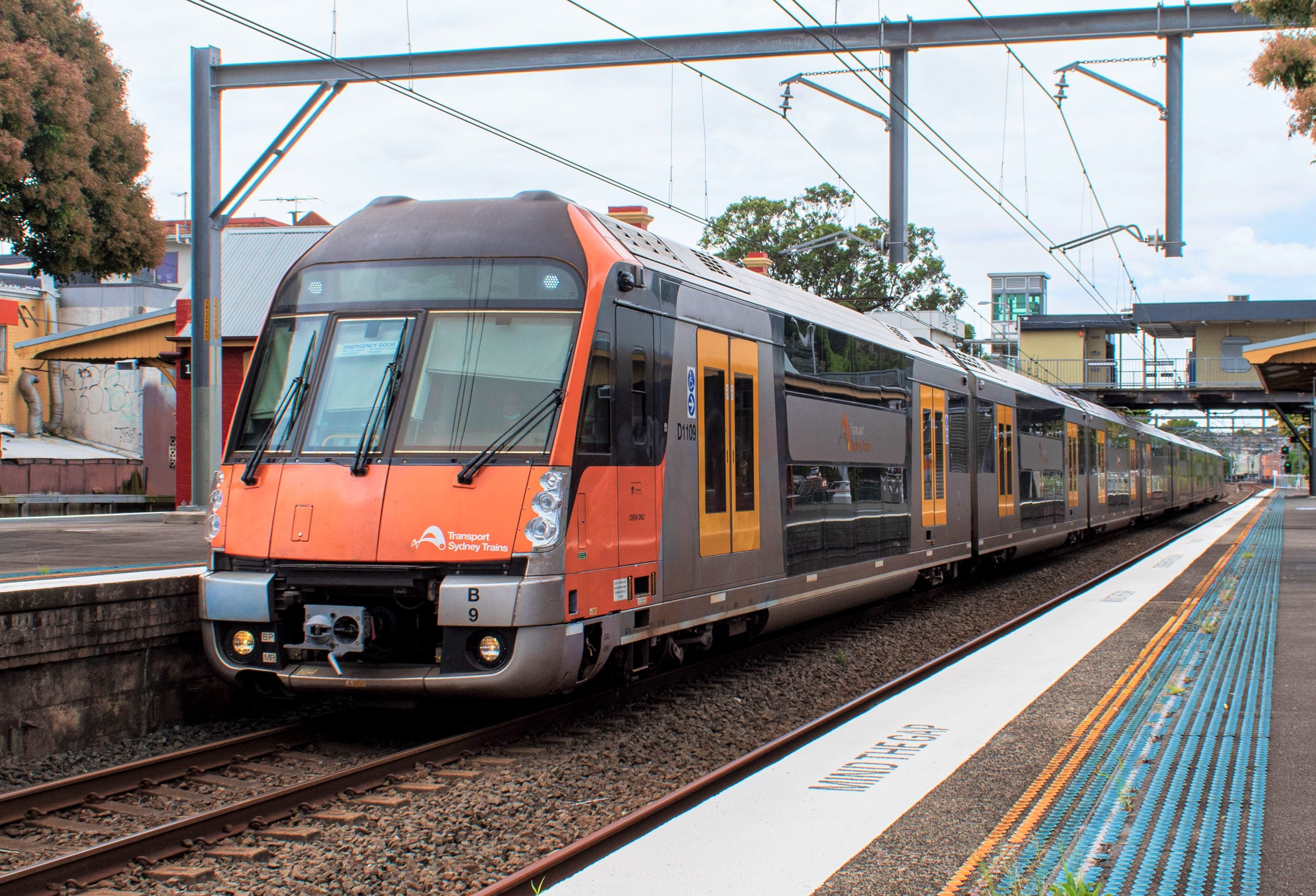
Sydney Trains B set at Carlton in February 2022

In June 1998, Downer Rail was successful in tendering to build a fleet of 140 electric suburban carriages, the Millennium Trains. Immediately after the tender was awarded, Downer Rail moved to prepare the old buildings for their new role. A seven-year lease with an option to buy the site was signed. Between 2010 and 2014, the Reliance Rail consortium, of which Downer Rail is a member, assembled 626 A set carriages for Sydney Trains. Between 2018 and 2021, 328 B Set carriages (initially 192) had also been commissioned at Cardiff following delivery from CRRC by the end of 2022.

Downer have also assembled diesel locomotives at Cardiff with the underframes built at EDI's Port Augusta workshops. Locomotives built at Cardiff were:

- 1 V class for Freight Australia: V544
- 4 90 class for Pacific National: 9032–9035
- 15 SCT class for SCT Logistics: SCT001–SCT015
- 14 LDP class for EDI Rail's Locomotive Demand Power: LDP001–LDP014
- 34 TT class for Pacific National: TT01–TT08, TT101–TT126
- 3 WH class for Whitehaven Coal: WH001–WH003
