= New South Wales E17 class locomotive =

Class of 0-6-0 steam locomotive operated in Australia

New South Wales E17 class
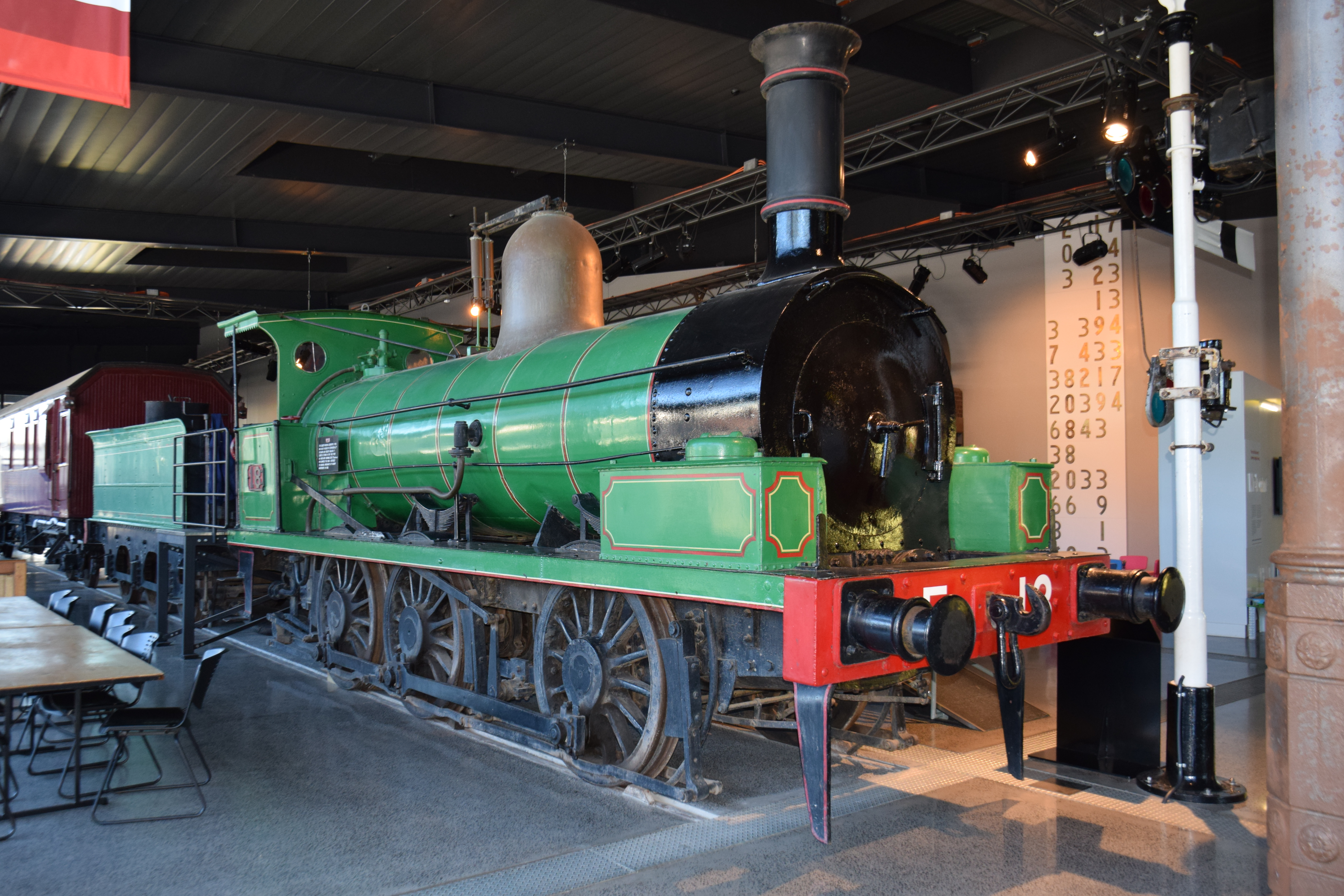
- Class E17 0-6-0 No.18 in green livery at the NSW Rail Museum, Thirlmere
Type and origin
- Power type: Steam
- Designer: Robert Stephenson & Company
- Builder: Robert Stephenson & Company (11); Mort's Dock & Engineering Company (6 assembled); Henry Vale (6)
- Build date: 1865
- Total produced: 23
Specifications
- Configuration
  - Whyte: 0-6-0
  - UIC: Cn
- Gauge: 4 ft 8 1/2 in (1,435 mm) standard gauge
- Driver dia.: 4 ft 0 in (1,219 mm)
- Superheater: None
- Cylinders: Two
- Cylinder size: 18 in × 24 in (457 mm × 610 mm)
Performance figures
- Tractive effort: 15,600 lbf (69.4 kN)
Career
- Operators: New South Wales Government Railways
- Class: E17
- Numbers: 17-22,40-47,52,103; 11N-13N,18N,19N,21N,22N
- Disposition: 1 preserved, remainder scrapped

The E.17 class is a class of patent long boiler steam locomotive built by the Robert Stephenson and Company for the New South Wales Government Railways of Australia.

== History ==
In the 1860s, rail construction in New South Wales was intensifying, with the Main South and Main West mainlines being extended to Goulburn and Bathurst respectively. Grades along this route were up to 1 in 30 (3.3%) steep. As a result, it was obvious that a heavy goods engine would be needed to carry cargo along these lines. These locomotives were based on Stephenson's patent long boiler engines of 1843 for the York & North Midland Railway. The first order, for six locomotives, was built by Robert Stephenson & Company, and these engines would be placed in service in 1865–7 on the Main South and Main West lines for goods workings. These locomotives quickly showed themselves to be useful, and as a result new orders were placed. Some of these were built by Vale & Lacy in Sydney, and other local firms. By July 1879, 23 of these engines were roaming the state's mainlines, seven for the then-isolated section of line near Newcastle.

== Accidents ==
On the night of 30 January 1878, a head-on collision between two E.17 class goods trains resulted in the drivers and firemen of both trains, together with a guard riding in the cab of the up train, being killed. The primitive system of working the trains was found to be a contributing factor. Both locomotives were written off and replaced by new locomotives supplied by Robert Stephenson & Company.

== Demise and preservation ==
Withdrawals began with 11N in 1889, and some were sold to coal mines or transferred to the Public Works Department (PWD) for construction duties around this time. Two of these engines would return to NSWGR ownership, 41X, classified X10 and renumbered 1003 in 1924 and scrapped in 1927, and E22, renumbered 1002 in 1924 and scrapped in 1929. Other long lived engines were 40, transferred to the PWD and from there sold to BHP in 1914, becoming that railway's No. 1. After being used to construct the plant, it was converted to a saddle tank, becoming known as "Old Lizzie" by BHP staff, the name sticking up to her scrapping in 1960. Vale & Lacy loco 42 was another long-lived engine, bought by the Caledonian Coal Co at West Wallsend. The engine was then bought by Australian Iron & Steel (AIS) in 1903, and placed into service in Wollongong, surviving dieselisation of the works and only being withdrawn in 1958 due to poor condition, being scrapped the following year. Number 18 was another lucky engine, sold to the Southern Coal Company at Corrimal in 1897. The engine was dismantled, awaiting overhaul, in 1963, when AIS brought the colliery, and the repairs were never finished. However, the relic would instead be donated to the fledgling NSW Rail Museum in Thirlmere, where it remains as of August 2020, statically preserved.

Preserved E17 class locomotives
No.	Description	Manufacturer	Year	Current organisation	Location	Status	Ref
18	0-6-0 mixed traffic	Robert Stephenson & Company	1865	Transport Heritage NSW	Thirlmere	static exhibit	
