= New South Wales C34 class locomotive =

Class of Australian 4-6-0 locomotives

New South Wales C34 class
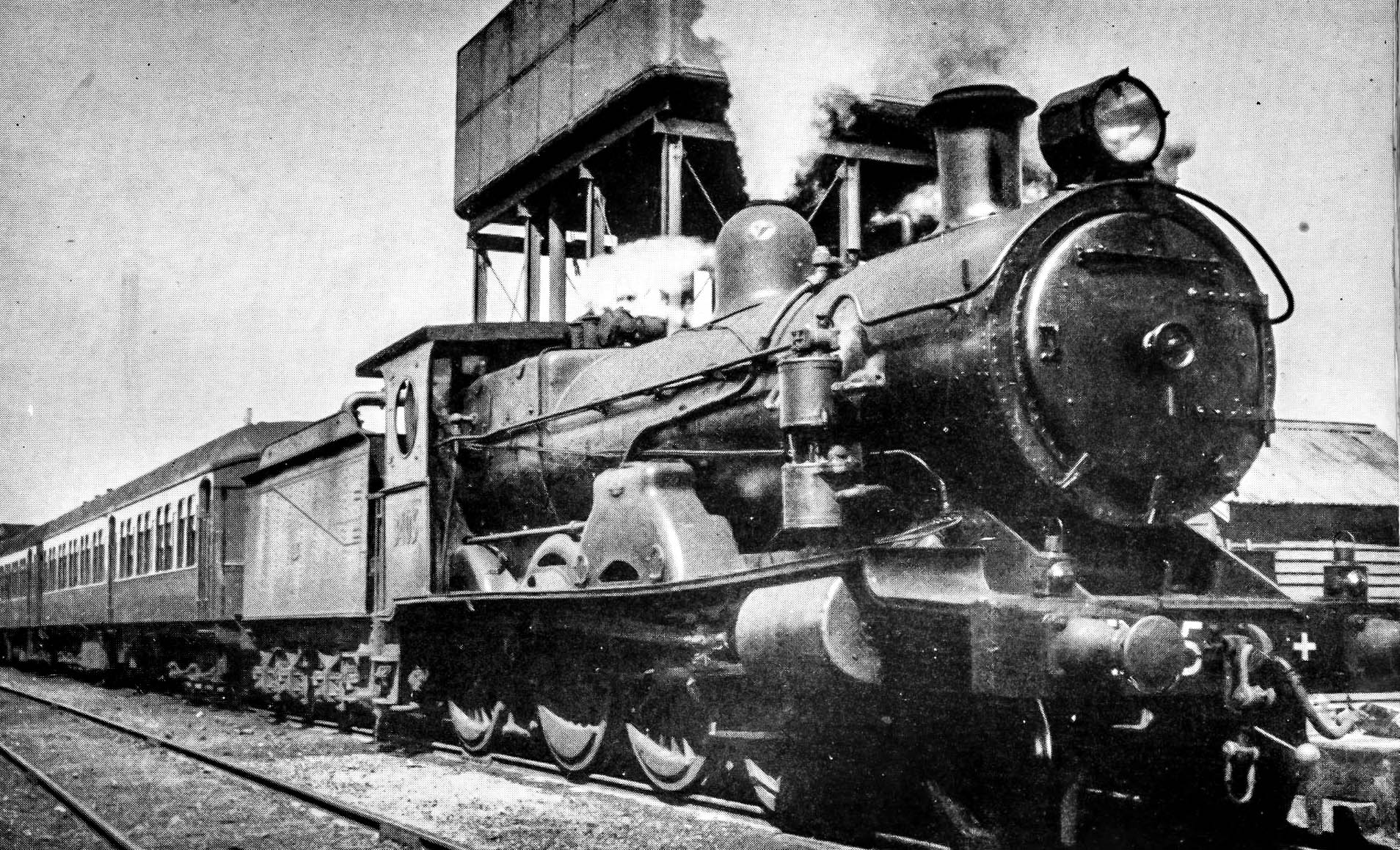
- Class C34 locomotive
Type and origin
- Power type: Steam
- Builder: Eveleigh Railway Workshops
- Build date: 1909–1910
- Total produced: 5
Specifications
- Configuration
  - Whyte: 4-6-0
  - UIC: 2'Ch
- Gauge: 4 ft 8 1/2 in (1,435 mm) standard gauge
- Driver dia.: 5 ft 9 in (1,753 mm)
- Adhesive weight: 110,000 lb (49,895 kg; 50 t)
- Loco weight: 148,000 lb (67,132 kg; 67 t)
- Fuel type: Coal
- Firebox
  - Grate area: 27 sq ft (2.5 m^{2})
- Boiler pressure: 180 psi (1.24 MPa)
- Heating surface: 1,625 sq ft (151.0 m^{2})
- Superheater
  - Heating area: 435 sq ft (40.4 m^{2})
- Cylinders: Two, outside
- Cylinder size: 21.5 in × 26 in (546 mm × 660 mm)
Performance figures
- Tractive effort: 26,650 lbf (118.5 kN)
- Factor of adh.: 4.13
Career
- Operators: New South Wales Government Railways
- Class: N928, C34 from 1924
- Numbers: 3401-3405 from 1924
- Disposition: All scrapped

The C34 class was a class of steam locomotives built by Eveleigh Railway Workshops for the New South Wales Government Railways of Australia.

== Design and construction ==
These five locomotives were an unsuccessful attempt at producing a larger, more powerful and faster version of the P6 class (C32 class) locomotives. Built by the New South Wales Government Railways' Eveleigh Railway Workshops, they entered service between December 1909 and April 1910.

== In service ==
They were rostered to haul express trains between Sydney and Junee, replacing their smaller cousins.

Around 1912, three of the class were transferred to Junee Locomotive Depot to work the section of the Main South line from there to Albury where they turned in a reasonable performance over this easy section. The other two were sent to Armidale for working the Brisbane Mail from Werris Creek to Wallangarra, however this move proved unsuccessful and they too were sent to Junee.

Some mechanical improvements were made in 1919 and they continued working south of Junee until the new 36 class locomotives began to work these trains from Sydney through to Albury from 1928. They were then transferred to Taree to work on the North Coast line. Their rough riding characteristics made them unsuitable on the almost continuously curved route and they returned to Junee in 1935, where they were assigned to assisting expresses to Wagga Wagga and working the South West Mail from Junee to Hay.

== Withdrawal ==
They were withdrawn from October 1950 as their boilers became due for replacement. The last withdrawn was 3402 in August 1957, although it was not scrapped until 1962 after some unsuccessful attempts to preserve it. Some consider the loss of the 34 class and the 58 class to be the catalyst for the formation of the former New South Wales Rail Transport Museum
