= Western Endeavour =

Steam locomotive hauled train in Australia

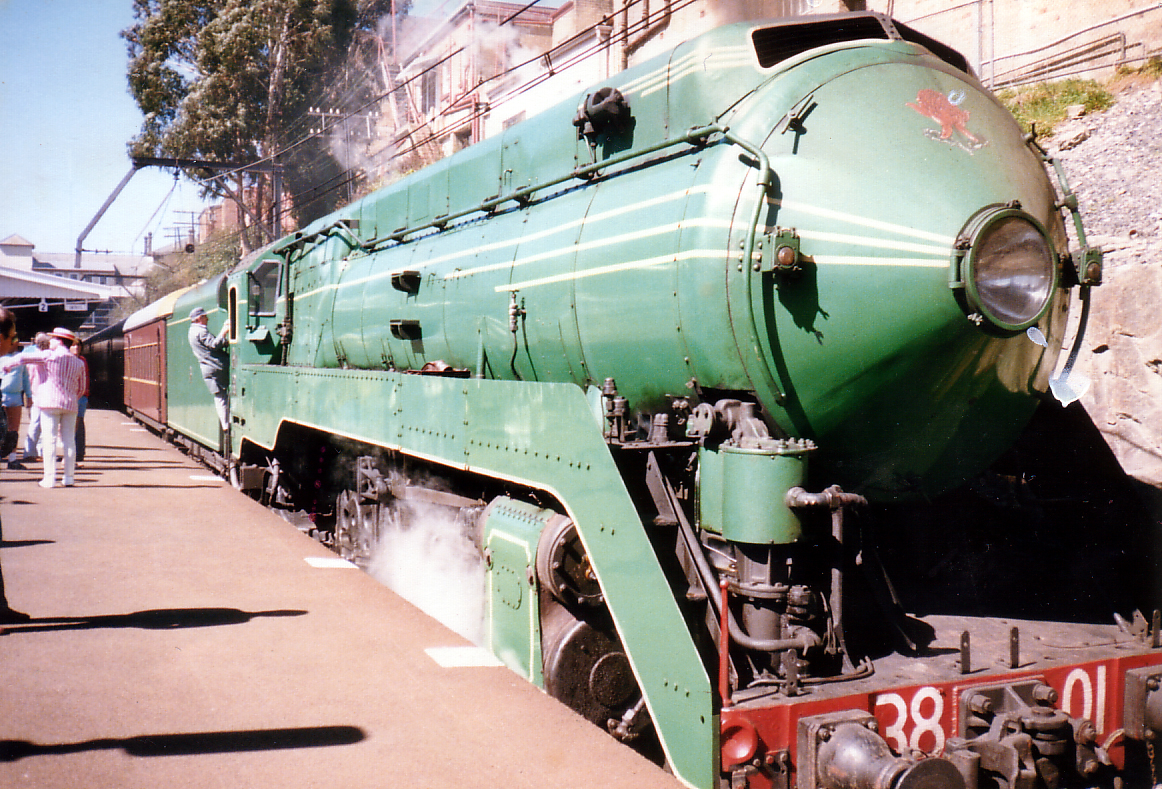
- 3801 at Lithgow station

Overview
- Service type: Special service
- First service: 22 August 1970
- Last service: 12 September 1970
- Former operator: New South Wales Rail Transport Museum

Route
- Termini: Sydney Central; East Perth
- Distance travelled: 5,000 miles (8,000 km)
- Average journey time: 22 days
- Service frequency: Special Tour
- Lines used: Main Western; Broken Hill; Trans Australian; Eastern Goldfields

Technical
- Rolling stock: 3801; 3813; New South Wales Government Railways non-airconditioned

The Western Endeavour was the first steam locomotive hauled train to operate from Sydney on Australia's east coast to Perth on the west coast in 1970.

== History ==
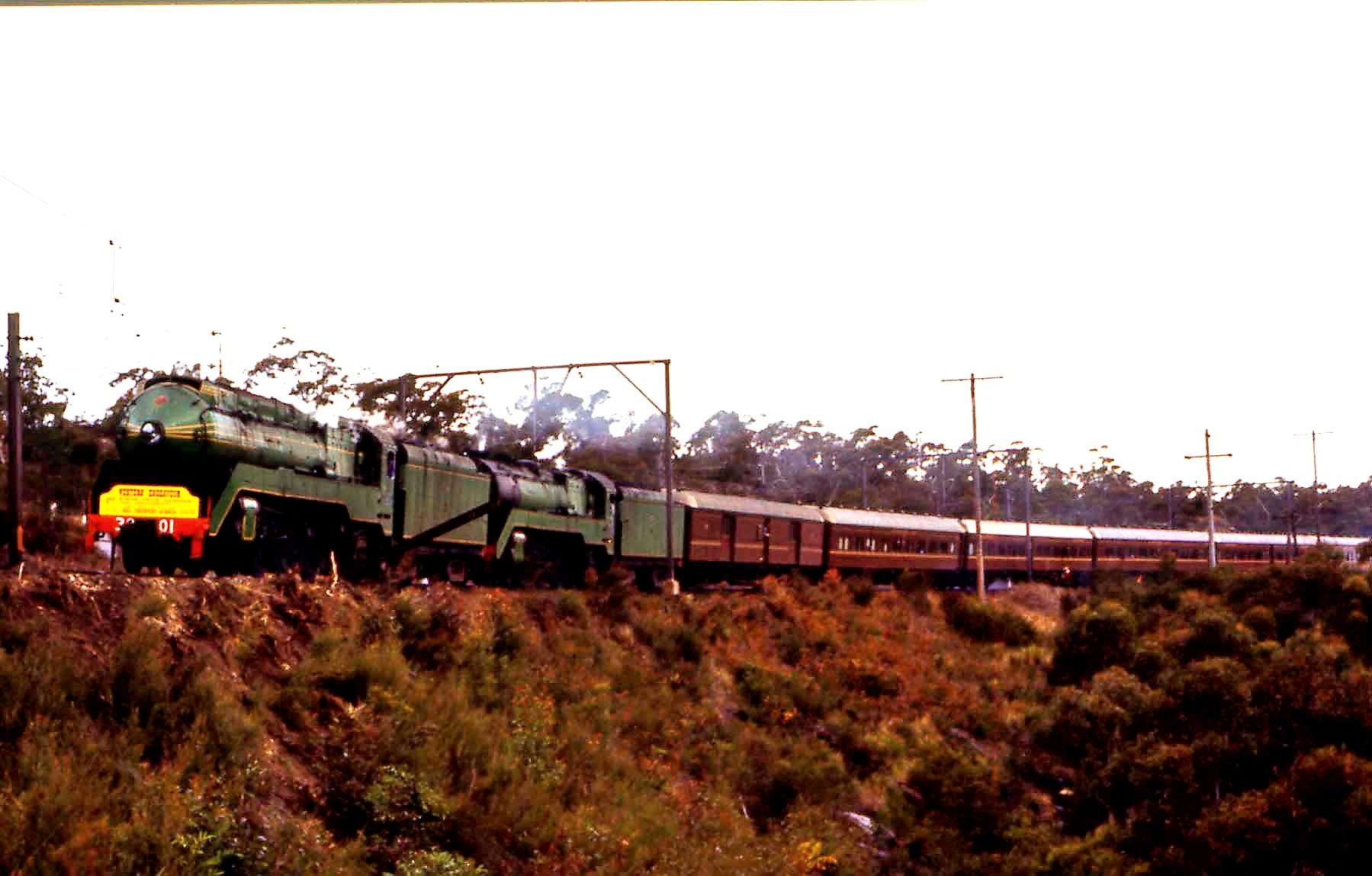
3801 and 3813

Following the completion of a project to convert the Sydney to Perth railway line to standard gauge in February 1970, the New South Wales Rail Transport Museum operated a steam locomotive hauled special across Australia in August and September 1970.

The special was the first steam locomotive hauled service to operate from the East to West coasts of Australia. At this time steam locomotives were being phased out of service, and had already ceased operating on some parts of the journey traversed. The train was hauled by 3801, with 3813 assisting as far as Port Augusta.

The train consisted of 8 sleeping carriages (5x TAM, 3x MAL), 2 FS cars (for Day Trippers that journeyed to Bathurst only), a dining car (AB90), a first class lounge carriage (BV931) and a crew/storage car (VHO1816). Water gins SWT 5 & 6 were picked up from Broken Hill. All carriages and both locomotives were overhauled and repainted at the Eveleigh Railway Workshops. Several trial runs were made with the full train as far as Goulburn. Both locomotives had their buffers removed as they would operate on railway systems where rolling stock did not have buffers.

The Western Endeavour departed Sydney Central on the 22 August 1970, arriving at East Perth on 28 August.

A water gin was added at Menindee, and the train left hauled only by 3801, the bridges of the plains not to be trusted with the weight of two 38 class locos. A second gin was added at Broken Hill, where doubleheading resumed. An air conditioned dining car was added at Port Pirie with an assist by a diesel, CL3, added at Port Augusta. During its time in SA, 3813 was used for various local tours.

The return journey departed Perth on 6 September, arriving on 12 September.

In April/May 1988, 3801 repeated the journey during the Australian Bicentenary, while LNER 4472 Flying Scotsman made the journey in September/October 1989.
