= New South Wales Z27 class locomotive =

Class of Australian 2-6-0 locomotives

New South Wales Z27 class
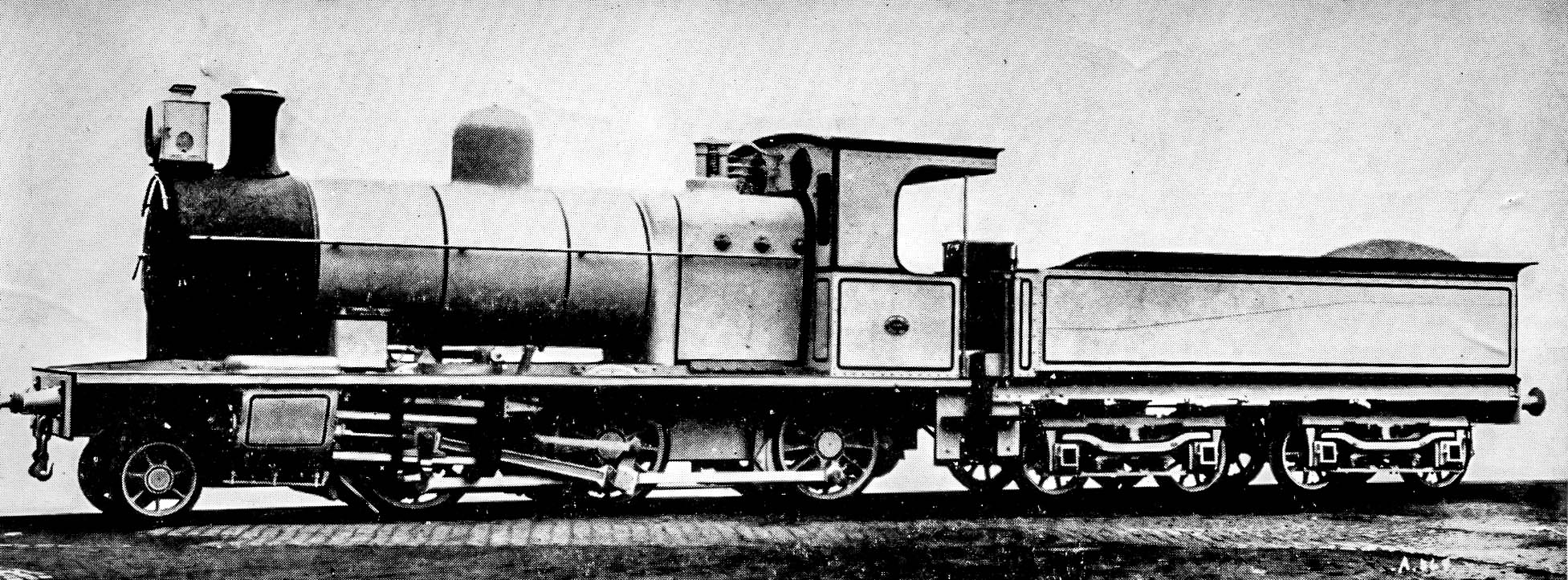
- Class Z27 locomotive
Type and origin
- Power type: Steam
- Builder: Hunslet Engine Company
- Build date: 1913
- Total produced: 8
Specifications
- Configuration
  - Whyte: 2-6-0
  - UIC: 1′Cn
- Gauge: 4 ft 8 1/2 in (1,435 mm) standard gauge
- Driver dia.: 4 ft 0 1/2 in (1,232 mm)
- Length: 54 ft 4 7/8 in (16.58 m)
- Axle load: 12 long tons 15 cwt (28,600 lb or 13 t)
- Adhesive weight: 36 long tons 8 cwt (81,500 lb or 37 t)
- Loco weight: 45 long tons 2 cwt (101,000 lb or 45.8 t)
- Total weight: 80 long tons 7 cwt (180,000 lb or 81.6 t)
- Fuel type: Coal
- Fuel capacity: New: 5 long tons 10 cwt (12,300 lb or 5.6 t)
- Water cap.: New: 2,150 imperial gallons (9,800 L; 2,580 US gal)
- Firebox
  - Grate area: 21 sq ft (2.0 m^{2})
- Boiler pressure: New: 160 psi (1.10 MPa), Dec. 1921: 150 psi (1.03 MPa)
- Heating surface: 1,240 sq ft (115 m^{2})
- Superheater: None
- Cylinders: Two, outside
- Cylinder size: 18 in × 24 in (457 mm × 610 mm)
- Valve gear: Walschaerts
- Valve type: Slide valves
Performance figures
- Tractive effort: New: 20,660 lbf (91.9 kN), Dec. 1921: 19,240 lbf (85.6 kN)
- Factor of adh.: New: 3.97, Dec. 1921: 4.24
Career
- Operators: New South Wales Public Works Department; New South Wales Government Railways
- Class: G1204, Z27 from 1924
- Numbers: PWD1-PWD8, 1204–1211, (2701–2708 from 1924)
- Retired: 1957–1966
- Disposition: 1 preserved, 7 scrapped

The Z27 class (formerly G.1204 class) is a class of steam locomotives built by Hunslet Engine Company for the New South Wales Government Railways of Australia.

== History ==
Eight 'Mogul' type locomotives were built in 1913 for the New South Wales Public Works Department as railway construction locomotives, working on lines such as Coffs Harbour to Glenreagh, Glenreagh to Dorrigo and the Tumbarumba railway line between Humula and Tumbarumba.

When the New South Wales Government Railways assumed responsibility for railway construction in 1917, these locomotives were transferred and became the (G)1204 class. These locomotives were considered too modern to be utilised on construction work and were transferred to more demanding duties. However, they were found to be unsuitable for working lines which abounded in curves, having a tendency to shed their valve motion on anything other than the straightest of track. They were transferred to Narrabri West where they stayed for practically the whole of their remaining lives, working to Moree, Pokataroo, Walgett, Mungindi and Boggabilla.

== Preservation ==
The first two withdrawals occurred in 1957, a further four followed in 1963.

Preserved Z27 class locomotives
| No. | Description | Manufacturer | Year | Organisation | Location | Status | Ref |
|---|---|---|---|---|---|---|---|
| 2705 | 2-6-0 Mixed Traffic | Hunslet Engine Company | 1913 | Transport Heritage NSW | Thirlmere | Operational | |
