= New South Wales C38 class locomotive =

Class of Australian 4-6-2 locomotives

New South Wales C38 class
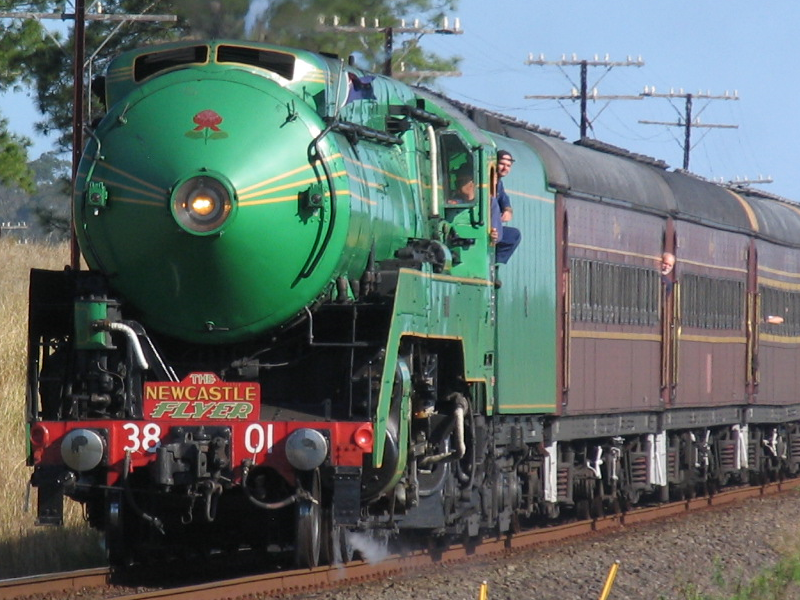
- 3801 on a Newcastle Flyer charter in October 2005
Type and origin
- Power type: Steam
- Builder: Clyde Engineering (5); Eveleigh Railway Workshops (13); Cardiff Locomotive Workshops (12)
- Build date: January 1943 – November 1949
Specifications
- Configuration
  - Whyte: 4-6-2
- Gauge: 4 ft 8 1/2 in (1,435 mm) standard gauge
- Driver dia.: 5 ft 9 in (1,753 mm)
- Wheelbase: 65 ft 7 1/8 in (19.99 m)
- Length: 76 ft 5 in (23.29 m)
- Total weight: 201 long tons (204 tonnes; 225 short tons) when in steam
- Fuel type: Coal
- Fuel capacity: 14 long tons (14.225 tonnes; 15.680 short tons)
- Water cap.: 8,100 imp gal (37,000 L; 9,700 US gal)
- Firebox
  - Grate area: 47 ft^{2} (4.4 m^{2})
- Boiler pressure: 245 psi (1.69 MPa)
- Heating surface
  - Tubes: 142 tubes, 2 1/4 in (57.1 mm) dia each
  - Flues: 36 flues, 2 1/4 in (57.1 mm) dia each
  - Total surface: 3,367.79 ft^{2} (312.878 m^{2})
- Superheater: 36 element
- Cylinders: Two, outside
- Cylinder size: 21.5 in × 26 in (550 mm × 660 mm)
- Valve gear: Walschaerts
Performance figures
- Tractive effort: 36,273 lbf (161.35 kN)
Career
- Operators: New South Wales Government Railways
- Class: C38
- Number in class: 30
- Numbers: 3801–3830
- Locale: New South Wales, Australia
- First run: 22 January 1943
- Last run: 29 December 1970
- Preserved: 3801, 3813, 3820, 3830
- Disposition: 4 preserved, 26 scrapped

The C38 class, occasionally known as the 38 class and nicknamed "Pacifics" by some railwaymen, is a class of 4-6-2 passenger steam locomotives built by Eveleigh Railway Workshops, Clyde Engineering and Cardiff Locomotive Workshops, for the New South Wales Government Railways in Australia.

Constructed between January 1943 and November 1949, the 30 locomotives in the class were designed to haul express passenger services throughout New South Wales. They were the only New South Wales locomotives to use the popular Pacific 4-6-2 wheel arrangement and were the last steam locomotives in the state to be built for passenger train operation, all subsequent deliveries being specifically for freight haulage. The C38 class were originally in a grey and black Grey Nurse livery, but was repainted bottle green.

== Design ==
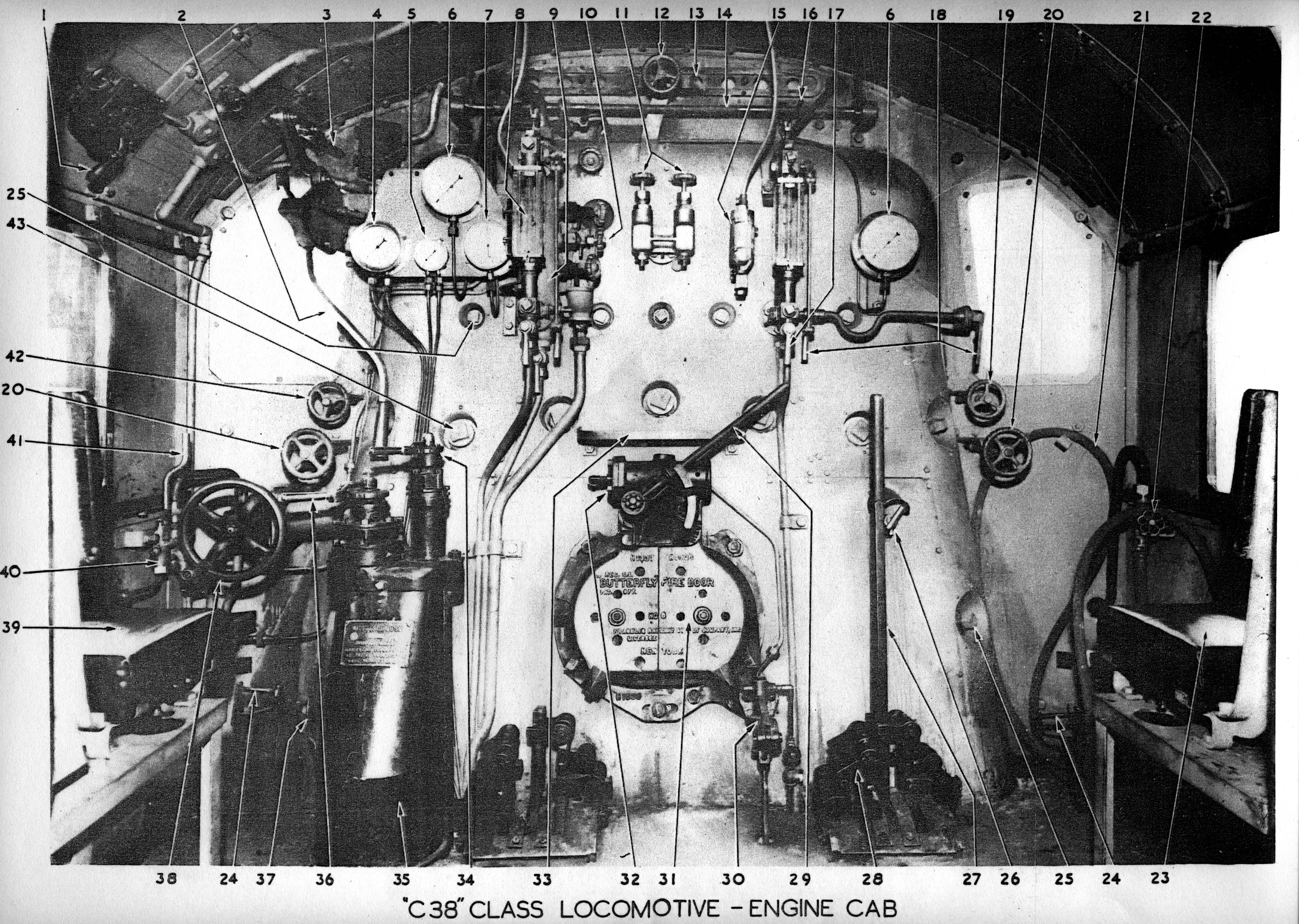
C.38 class locomotive cab controls

The 38 class were first conceived in the 1930s when the NSWGR established there was a need for a locomotive to eliminate the complications of double heading on a number of fast intrastate passenger trains.

The design was influenced by the fashion for streamlining at the time, including elements of the class J locomotives of the Norfolk and Western Railway and of some of the streamlined versions of the PRR K4 locomotives in the United States. The design team was headed by Harold Young, the Principal Design Engineer (later Chief Mechanical Engineer) of the NSWGR. The conditions of trackwork with frequent sharp curvature to be traversed at high speed would require six-coupled driving wheels in a 'Pacific' 4-6-2 configuration. Maintenance requirements suggested a two-cylinder simple steam locomotive.

The design was carried out by the NSWGR Locomotive Section of the Design Office and incorporated the latest developments in locomotive design from Australia and overseas. The incorporation of as many Australian manufactured components as possible was a requirement at the design stage.

Similarly to the earlier D57 class (which had some input from Young), the massively proportioned locomotive incorporated a cast steel chassis. The design also sported cast Boxpok coupled wheels for better rotational balance, and a Delta trailing truck.

== History ==
In May 1939, an order for five 38 class locomotives was placed with Clyde Engineering. They suffered many delays during construction, mostly due to resource shortages caused by World War II and the Great Depression. The first five locomotives, built by Clyde Engineering, had a semi-streamlined boiler casing similar to the J class of New Zealand. However, with this design, the firemen could not maintain steam in the 245 psi boiler – the highest boiler pressure of any engine in Australia. In early trials on the Southern line, 3801, the class leader, was allocated two firemen. The fault was located when it was found that the shape of the blast pipe prevented steam from the cylinders from passing optimally into the petticoat pipe below the chimney, through which it was ejected to the atmosphere. In turn, this reduced the suction of hot gases through the boiler tubes, making it more demanding to fire. Soon the blast pipe was adjusted, and the C38 class became noted for the clean "bark" of its exhaust.

As the last of the five initial locomotives were leaving the shop in 1945, a decision was made to purchase more. This order of 25 locomotives were built at the New South Wales Government Railways' Eveleigh Railway Workshops (13, even-numbered) and Cardiff Locomotive Workshops (12, odd-numbered); all were non-streamlined for quicker maintenance.

The locomotives built by Clyde Engineering were delivered in wartime grey. After the war, all were repainted green, as the 25 unstreamlined locomotives had been from new. In the 1950s, all except 3813 were painted black. 3801 and 3830 had their green livery restored due to pressure from heritage groups in the 1960s.

Among the services they initially hauled were the Central West Express, Newcastle Flyer, Melbourne Limited Express, Riverina Express and South Coast Daylight Express as well as the overnight mail trains. Because of their axle load, they were confined to operating between Sydney and the following extremities of operation: Port Kembla (Coniston), Albury, Dubbo and Maitland, although they worked the North Coast passenger trains to Brisbane until track problems surfaced.

Following the arrival of the 42, 43 and 44 class diesel locomotives in the 1950s, these began to take over some express services, but the 38 class continued to haul many passenger and freight trains. Even after the electrification of the Main Western line to Lithgow in 1957 and the Main North line to Gosford in January 1960, using 46 class electric locomotives, the 38s still operated the Central West Express between Lithgow and Orange into the 1960s and the Newcastle Flyer between Gosford and Newcastle until December 1970.

The 38 class briefly returned to the former Melbourne Limited Express route in April 1962, when 3830 and 3813 hauled the inaugural standard gauge Spirit of Progress from Albury to Sydney. The first 38 class locomotive was withdrawn in 1961 with the last withdrawn in December 1970.

In August 1970, 3801 hauled the Western Endeavour to Perth following the conversion to standard gauge of the Sydney–Perth rail corridor with 3813 assisting as far as Port Pirie. In April 1988, 3801 again operated to Perth during the Australian Bicentenary.

Locomotive 3801 featured in an evocative 1974 short film, A Steam Train Passes, which won many awards and is generally regarded as Australia's finest railway film.

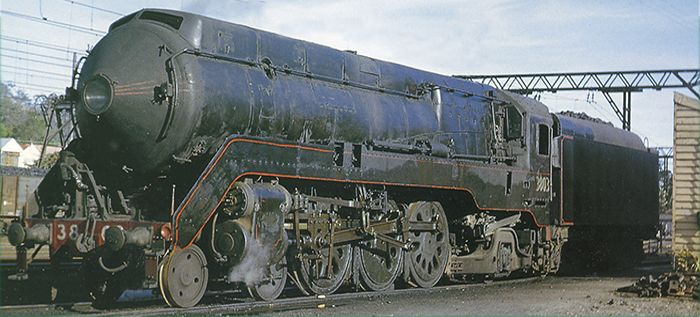
3803

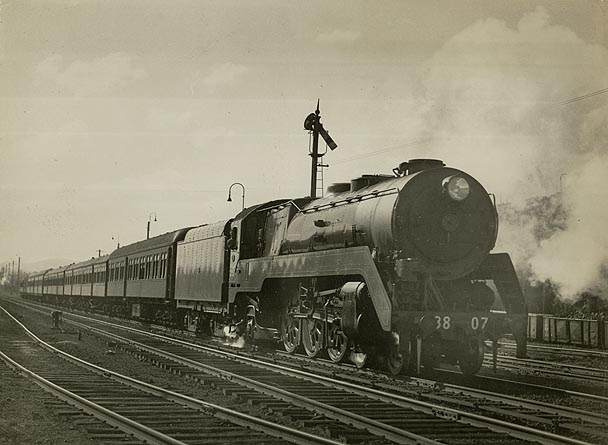
3807 on The Riverina Express in 1946

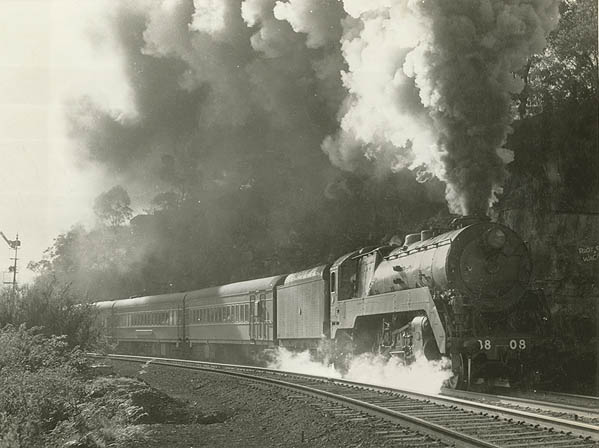
3808

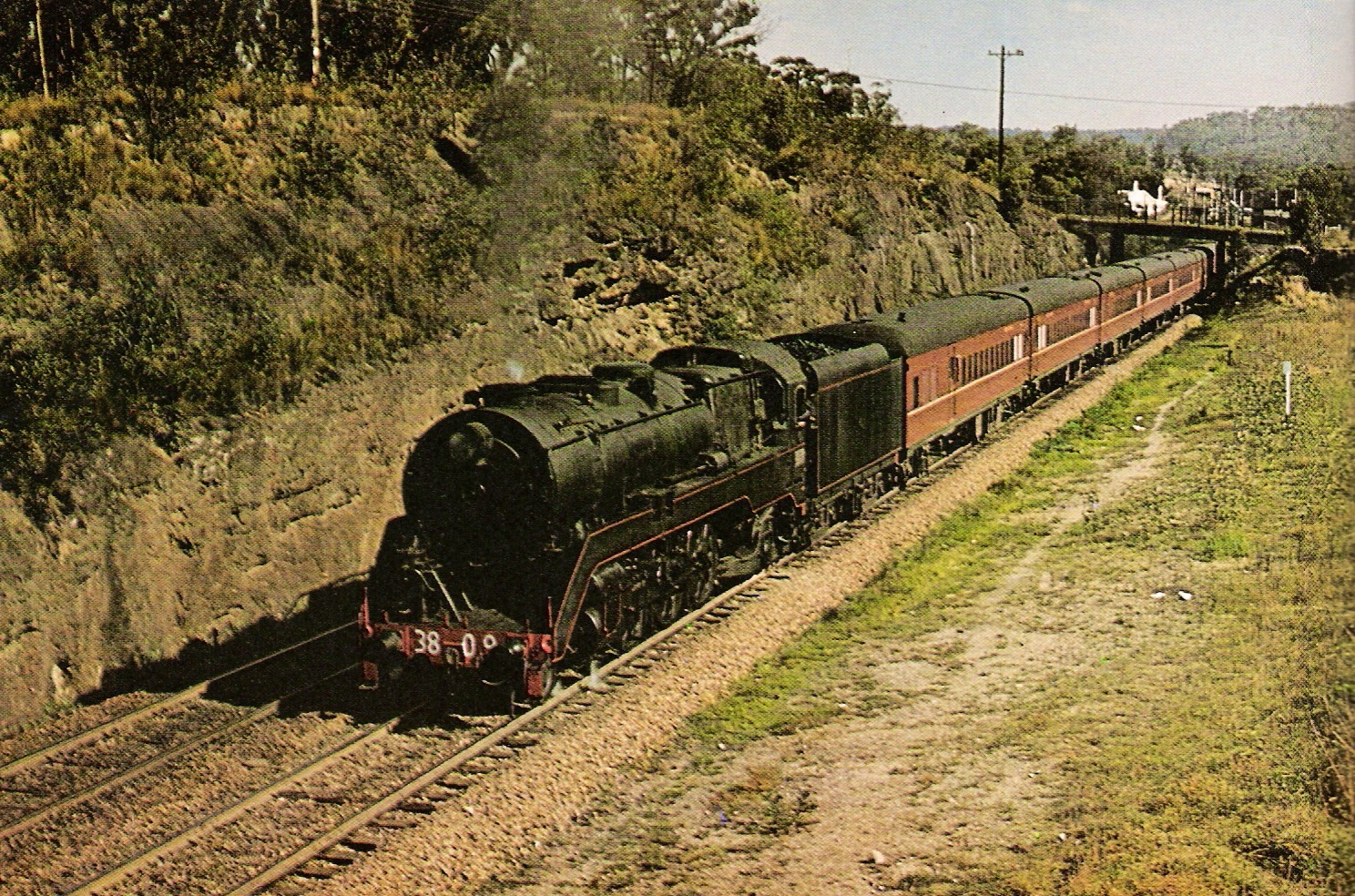
3809

== Roster ==
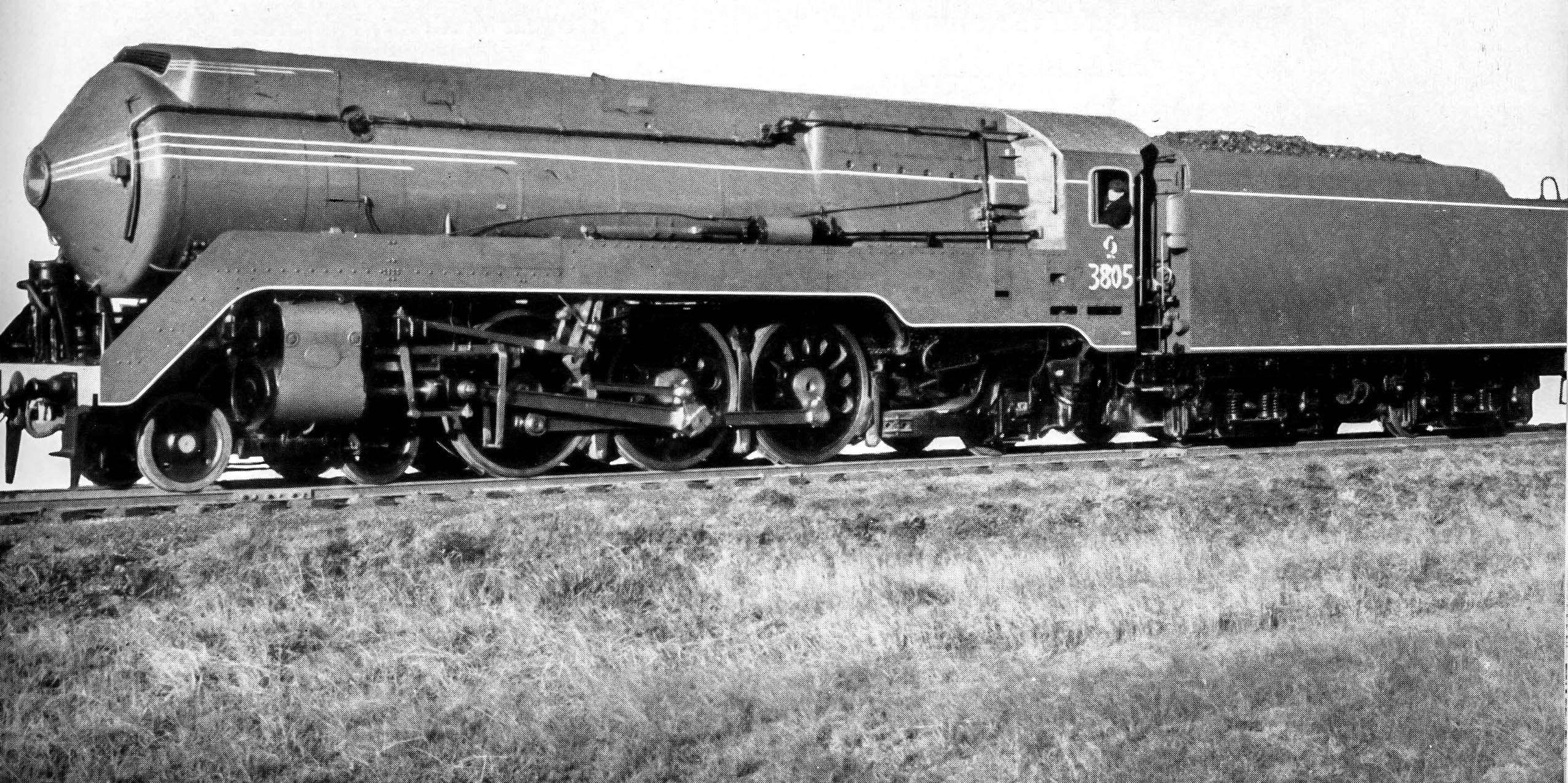
Streamlined 3805

Streamlined
Locomotive	Builder	Builder's no	Built	In service	Withdrawn
3801	Clyde Engineering	463	Dec 1942	22 Jan 1943	19 Oct 1965
3802	Clyde Engineering	464	Mar 1943	8 Apr 1943	31 Jan 1967
3803	Clyde Engineering	465	Aug 1943	9 Sep 1943	29 Feb 1968
3804	Clyde Engineering	466	Jan 1944	10 Feb 1944	29 Oct 1965
3805	Clyde Engineering	467	Feb 1945	2 Mar 1945	Dec 1961

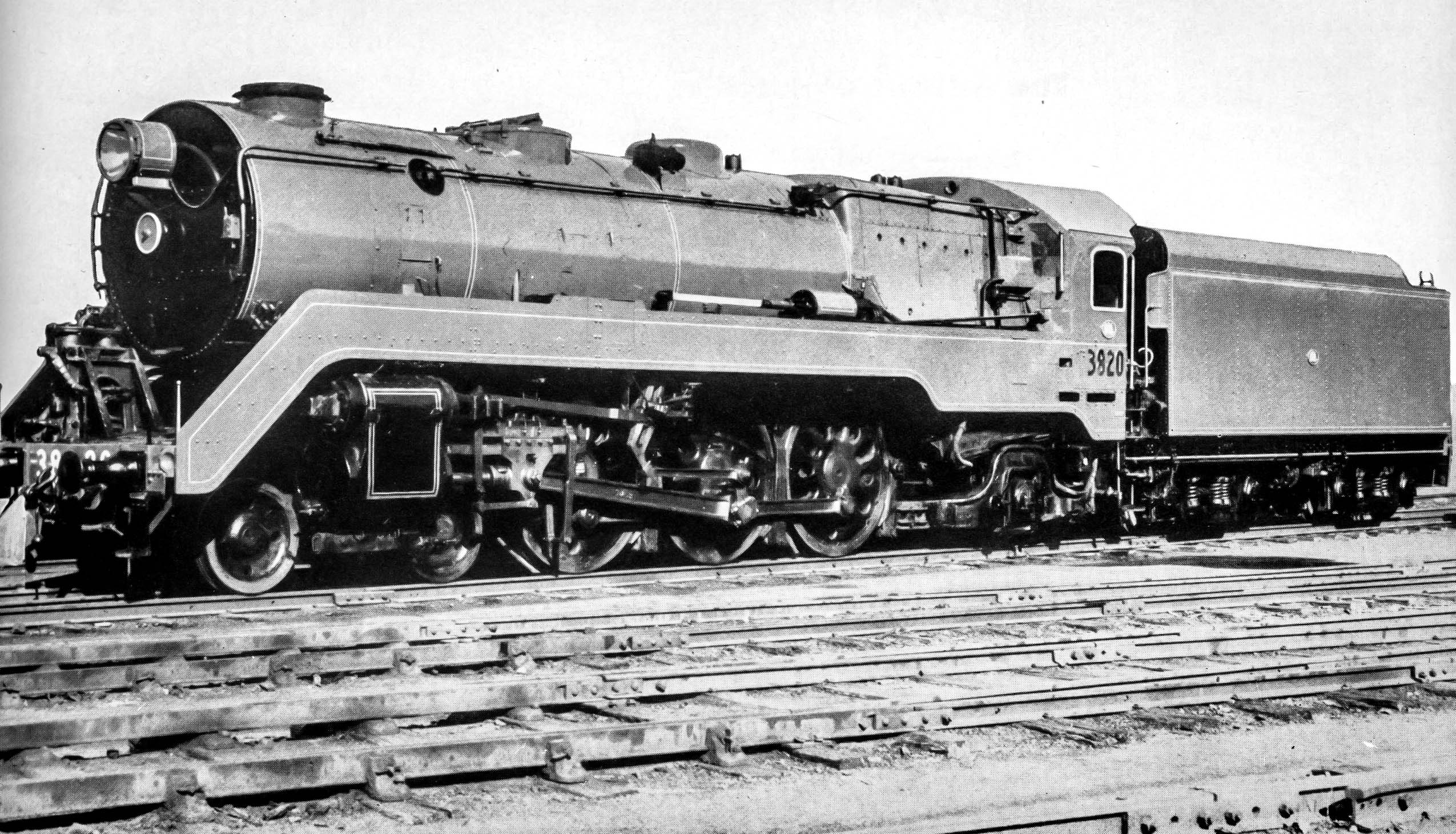
Non streamlined 3820

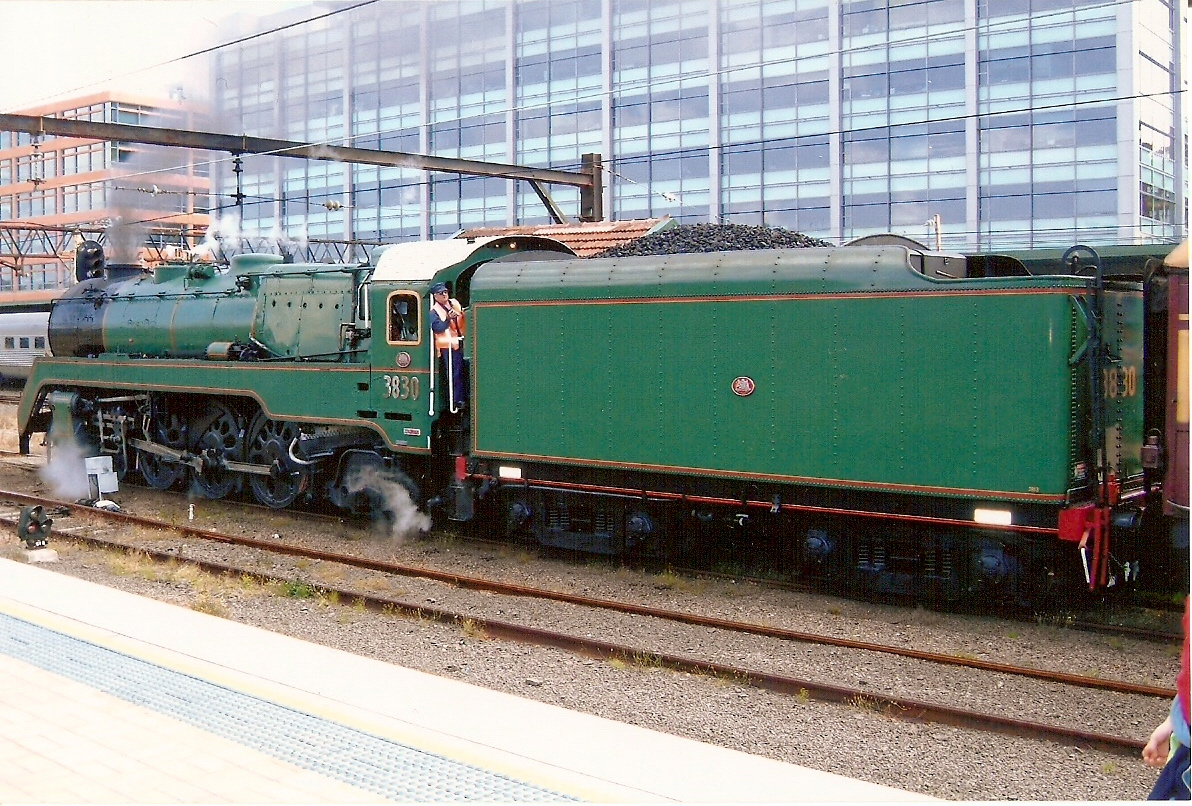
3830 at Sydney

Non streamlined
Locomotive	Builder	Builder's no	Built	Withdrawn
3806	Eveleigh Railway Workshops	158	1945	1967
3807	Cardiff Locomotive Workshops	159	1946	28 Sep 1968
3808	Eveleigh Railway Workshops	160	1946	1968
3809	Cardiff Locomotive Workshops	161	1946	1969
3810	Eveleigh Railway Workshops	162	1946	1969
3811	Cardiff Locomotive Workshops	163	1946	1969
3812	Eveleigh Railway Workshops	164	1946	1965
3813	Cardiff Locomotive Workshops	165	1946	12 Sep 1970
3814	Eveleigh Railway Workshops	166	1946	1966
3815	Cardiff Locomotive Workshops	167	1947	1967
3816	Eveleigh Railway Workshops	168	1947	1966
3817	Cardiff Locomotive Workshops	169	1947	1963
3818	Eveleigh Railway Workshops	170	1947	1968
3819	Cardiff Locomotive Workshops	171	1947	1963
3820	Eveleigh Railway Workshops	172	1947	29 Dec 1970
3821	Cardiff Locomotive Workshops	173	1948	1962
3822	Eveleigh Railway Workshops	174	1947	1970
3823	Cardiff Locomotive Workshops	175	1948	1967
3824	Eveleigh Railway Workshops	176	1948	1969
3825	Cardiff Locomotive Workshops	177	1948	1969
3826	Eveleigh Railway Workshops	178	1948	1961
3827	Cardiff Locomotive Workshops	179	1948	1970
3828	Eveleigh Railway Workshops	180	1949	1969
3829	Cardiff Locomotive Workshops	181	1949	1966
3830	Eveleigh Railway Workshops	182	1949	1967

== Preservation ==
4 of the 30 38 class locomotives survive-3801, 3813, 3820 and 3830. 3813 is in pieces at Dorrigo after an overhaul in 1972 by the former NSW Rail Transport Museum was forced to be stopped by the then commissioner of the Public Transport Commission, Philip Shirley who ordered that the locomotive's parts be transferred to the scrapyard. The NSWRTM managed a reprive and the parts were sent to be stored in many locations. Components such as the wheels, cab and smokebox were stored in S trucks at Thirlmere, the frame and tender at Clyde and the boiler at Castle Hill until they were donated to the Dorrigo Steam Railway & Museum. Over time all were donated to the Dorrigo museum and put in storage there.

Preserved C38 class locomotives
No.	Image	Description	Manufacturer	Year	Organisation	Location	Status	Ref
3801		4-6-2 express passenger	Clyde Engineering	1943	Transport Heritage NSW	Thirlmere	Operational	NSW Heritage Register Locomotive, Steam 3801
3813		4-6-2 express passenger	Cardiff Locomotive Workshops	1946	Dorrigo Steam Railway & Museum	Dorrigo	Dismantled	
3820		4-6-2 express passenger	Eveleigh Railway Workshops	1947	Transport Heritage NSW	Thirlmere	Static exhibit	NSW Heritage Register Locomotive, Steam 3820
3830		4-6-2 express passenger	Eveleigh Railway Workshops	1949	Powerhouse Museum	Thirlmere	Stored	Powerhouse Museum Locomotive 3830
