= 1968 in rail transport =

This article lists events related to rail transport that occurred in 1968.

== Events ==
=== January ===
- January 6 – The Hixon rail crash occurs when a low-loader road transporter is struck by an express train on an automatic half-barrier level crossing at Hixon, Staffordshire, England. 11 people are killed. This has repercussions on the arrangements for automating level crossings on British Rail.

=== February ===
- February 1 – The Pennsylvania Railroad and the New York Central Railroad merge to form the Penn Central. Terms of the merger with the New York, New Haven and Hartford Railroad have not yet been agreed with the Interstate Commerce Commission; in the interim, the Penn Central will financially support the New Haven.
- February 9 – The first line of the Rotterdam Metro opens, being the first rapid transit line to open in The Netherlands.

=== March ===
- March 4 – Pear Tree and Normanton railway station in Derby, England, is closed as part of the Beeching cuts.

=== April ===
- April 1 – Abukuma Express line opened in Japan.
- April 4 – Transit Planning Study Chicago Central Area, a three volume report authorized in 1965, is published by the City of Chicago, Chicago Transit Authority, and other public agencies. It proposed a new Loop Subway under Randolph, Wabash, Van Buren and Franklin Streets to replace the Loop elevated system (which still exists today), and a Distributor Subway system under Monroe Street to the North Michigan Avenue business district and McCormick Place. After 1970, it was referred to as the Chicago Central Area Transit Project.
- April 5 – The Ulster Transport Authority (UTA), responsible for closing most of the northern part of the Irish railway system, is dissolved. Northern Ireland Railways (NIR) (formed as Ulster Transport Railways) takes over operation of railways in Northern Ireland.
- April 7 – Kobe Rapid Transit Railway Line, Hanshin Sannomiya to Nishidai and Hankyu Sannomiya to Shinkaichi route officially completed in Hyogo Prefecture, Japan, Sanyo Himeji to Umeda of Osaka route direct commuter express service start to 1998.

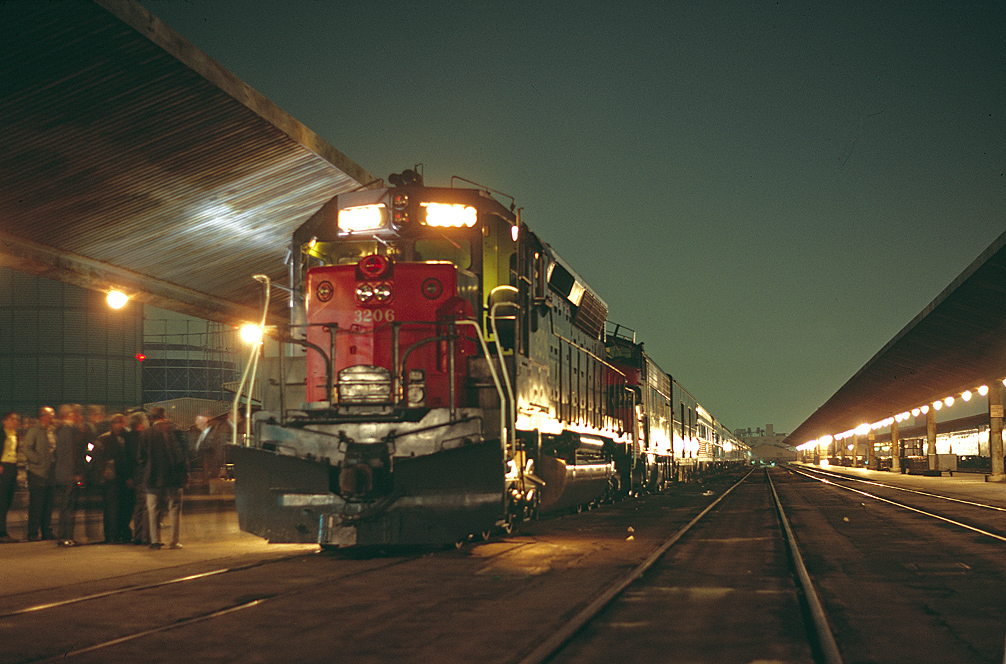
The final Southern Pacific Lark prepares to depart Union Station in Los Angeles on April 8, 1968.

- April 8
  - The last run of the Golden State passenger train on the Rock Island and Southern Pacific railroads departs Los Angeles, California.
  - The final Southern Pacific Lark departs from Los Angeles en route to San Francisco.
- April 27 – Kamalapur railway station was inaugurated by Pakistani president Ayub Khan in East Pakistan (now Bangladesh).

=== June ===
- June 12 – Following the withdrawal of Soo Line Railroad's objections, the Interstate Commerce Commission reaffirms its approval of the proposed CNW/CGW merger.
- June 21 – Toei Subway Line 1 (present-day Asakusa Line) opens between Daimon and Sengakuji in Tokyo, Japan, enabling through service onto the Keihin Kyuko Railway (Keikyu). This is the sixth extension of the line since it opened in 1960.

=== July ===
- July 1 – The Chicago Great Western Railway is merged into the Chicago and North Western Railway to avoid bankruptcy.
- July 4 – Renfe opens the Madrid–Burgos direct railway in Spain using Talgo trains.
- July 19 – Atchison, Topeka and Santa Fe Railway's Texas Chief passenger train discontinues station stops at Dallas, Texas.
- July 30
  - The Chicago and North Western Railway railroad acquires the Des Moines and Central Iowa Railway and the Fort Dodge, Des Moines and Southern Railway.
  - The Atchison, Topeka and Santa Fe Railway operates its last passenger train on its subsidiary Grand Canyon Railway, carrying only three passengers for the final run.

=== August ===
- August 4 – Santa Fe Railroad discontinues the Dallas, Texas, section of the Texas Chief.
- August 11 – British Rail operates its last steam locomotives on the standard gauge, the "Fifteen Guinea Special".
- August 22 – Magma Arizona Railroad discontinues its use of steam locomotives.

Ticket issued on first day of service on London Underground’s Victoria line

=== September ===
- September 1 – The Victoria line of the London Underground opens between Walthamstow Central and Highbury and Islington.

=== October ===
- October 4 – First section of Frankfurt U-Bahn opens, pioneering the Stadtbahn concept in Germany.
- October 14 – The Queen opens British Rail's rebuilt Euston station in London.

=== November ===
- November 15 – Toei Subway Line 1 (present-day Asakusa Line) opens between Sengakuji and Nishi-magome in Tokyo, Japan. This is the seventh extension of the line since it opened in 1960.
- November 30 – Swiss Federal Railways officially operates its last steam locomotive on the standard gauge.

=== December ===
- December 5 – The Southern Railway (U.S.) discontinues the Carolina Special.
- December 6 – Denver and Rio Grande Western Railroad operates its last steam-hauled freight train over its 914 mm (3 ft) gauge San Juan Extension, Alamosa–Durango.
- December 23 – Nanjing Yangtze River Bridge, opened in China, with a rail track on the lower deck completing the Beijing–Shanghai railway.
- December 27 – Toei Mita Line opened in Japan with an initial section between Sugamo and Shimura (now Takashimadaira).
- December 31 – Penn Central's purchase of the New York, New Haven and Hartford Railroad is completed.

=== Unknown date ===
- The fully automated Muskingum Electric Railroad in southeastern Ohio begins operation.
- Murmansk–Nikel Railway completed throughout.
- South African Railways 2 ft (610 mm) gauge NGG16 class no. 156 completed by Hunslet Taylor, Johannesburg: last Garratt locomotive and SAR's last steam locomotive.
- The Philippine National Railways scraps its last known flagship tender locomotive built prior to World War II. Manila Railroad No. 176, a 170 class locomotive, entered service in 1922 and was primarily used on the inaugural Bicol Express to Legazpi, Albay starting in 1938.

== Deaths ==
- October 7 - Richard M. Dilworth, General Motors Electro-Motive Division chief engineer credited with developing the diesel-electric locomotive concept in the 1930s (b. 1885).
