= Honeysuckle Development Corporation =

Honeysuckle Development Corporation (HDC) was a corporation owned by the Government of New South Wales with responsibility for a major urban renewal project on the harbourside of Newcastle, the state's second-largest city.

HDC was established by the state government in 1992 to guide redevelopment of disused industrial land on the southern foreshore of Newcastle Harbour. The 50-hectare Honeysuckle site is close to the city's central business district and, although not yet fully redeveloped, already contains a mix of new residential, commercial and public buildings.

In 2007 the organisation merged with the Regional Land Management Corporation to form the Hunter Development Corporation.
