= Newcastle Flyer =

Former train service in Australia

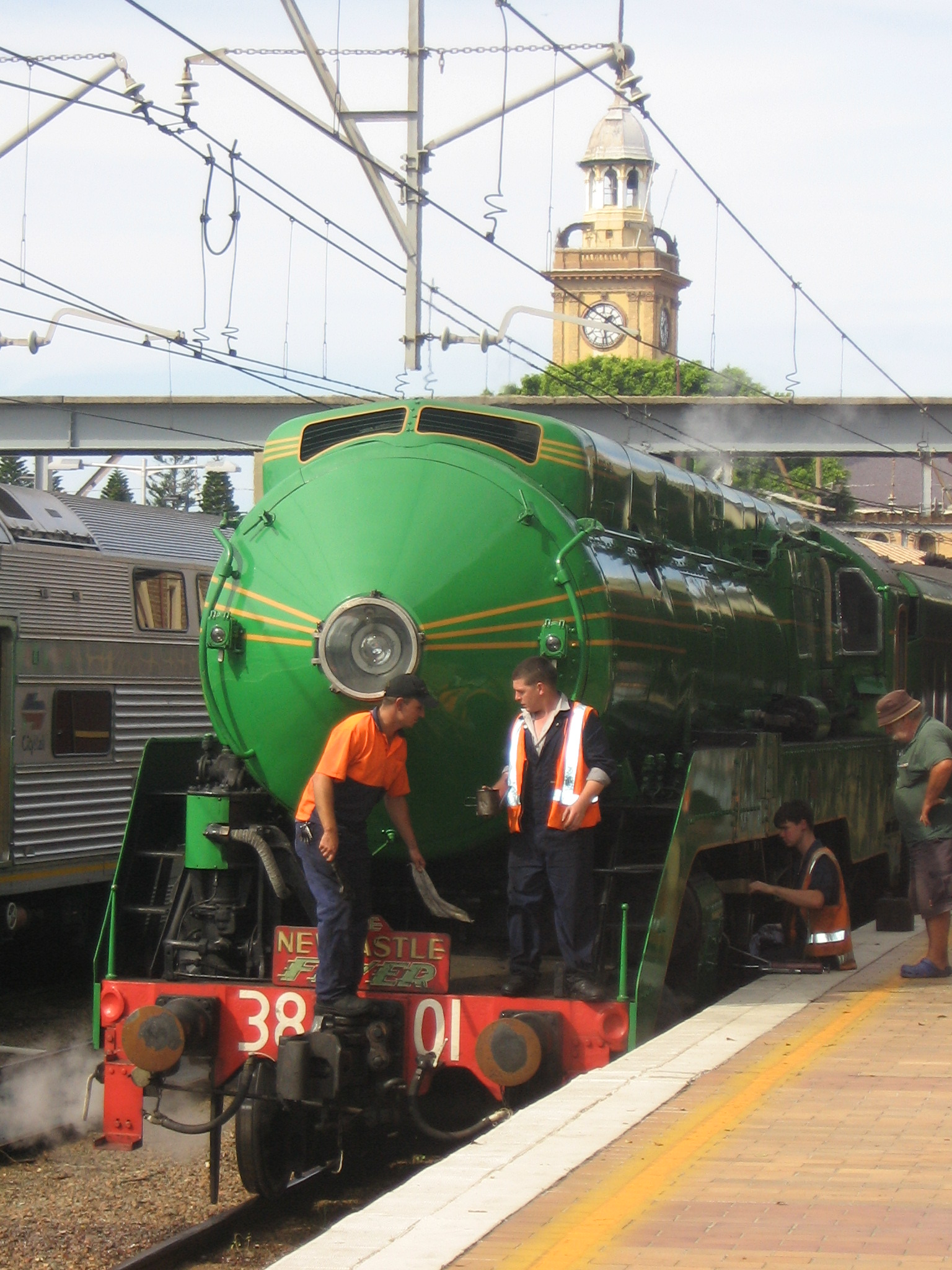
- 3801 at Newcastle station preparing to head south heading the Newcastle Flyer heritage train in April 2007

Overview
- Service type: Passenger train
- Status: Ceased
- First service: 11 November 1929
- Last service: 8 April 1988
- Former operator: State Rail Authority

Route
- Termini: Sydney; Newcastle
- Distance travelled: 168 kilometres
- Service frequency: 3 times per day in each direction
- Line used: Main Northern railway line

The Newcastle Flyer was an Australian passenger express train service connecting New South Wales' two largest cities, Sydney and Newcastle. The name was originally used from November 1929 until April 1988.

== Early history ==
On 1 May 1889, the first trains began running between Sydney and Newcastle. However, it was not until November 1929, with the pending completion of the Pacific Highway, that a premier express service was introduced. Two trains named the Inter City Express and the Northern Commercial Limited were introduced taking 2 hours 45 minutes to cover the 168 kilometres. These were hauled by a selected group of 32 class locomotives. The newly refurbished L type carriages were painted in a dedicated red and cream livery and from 1933, the locomotives were painted maroon.

== The 36 class hauled trains ==
In late 1934, brand new 36 class locomotives were introduced along with refurbished Pullman carriages. In September 1936, the Northern Commercial Limited was renamed the Newcastle Express and in April 1937, the first non-stop service was introduced with a journey time of 2 hours 20 minutes. In April 1939, brand new NCR rolling stock was introduced. A coal miners strike saw Silver City Comet diesel rolling stock operate the services in 1940.

== The 38 class hauled trains ==
In January 1943, the first 38 class locomotive entered service. Although 3801 first worked a Newcastle Flyer service in February 1943, it would not be until May 1944 that they were regularly introduced and even then they continued to share the duties with the 36 class locomotives for another three years. From July 1945 a third daily service was introduced with all services now operating as the Newcastle Express. From November 1947 all services were operated by 38 class locomotives with a fastest journey time of 2 hours 18 minutes.

In April 1948, air-conditioned HUB set rolling stock was introduced to the service replacing N type steel carriages. The Newcastle Flyer was the last express train in Australia to be worked by steam locomotives. This came to an end on 29 December 1970 when 3820 hauled the final steam powered service.

== Diesel and electric hauled trains ==
From January 1956, the Newcastle Flyer was sometimes hauled by diesel locomotives, but the 38 class remained the usual motive power. When electrification to Gosford was completed in January 1960, the trains were usually hauled between Sydney and Gosford by a 46 class, with normally a 38 class locomotive north of Gosford until diesels took over from 1970. Following the line through to Newcastle being electrified from June 1984, the more modern 86 class began operating the services throughout although 46 class locomotives occasionally appeared.

== Demise ==
With electrification the V sets began operating most services between Sydney and Newcastle. Given their superior speed and level of comfort, it was inevitable that demand for the Newcastle Flyer would decrease. From early 1985, the sets were reduced from seven to five carriages and from March 1986, first class accommodation was removed. By November 1987, only the morning Sydney bound and evening return remained and these ceased on 8 April 1988, replaced by unnamed V set services.

== Revival ==
In January 1992, in the CityRail timetable, a morning Sydney bound and evening return V set service were called the Newcastle Flyer. The name was dropped from the November 1996 timetable.

In November 2017, nearly 3 years after the truncation of the line to Newcastle, a new Sydney-Newcastle fast service was trialled. The service departed the newly built Newcastle Interchange at 5:03 am and arrive at Central at 7:26 am. The return service departed Central at 3:45 pm and arrived at Newcastle Interchange at 6:12 pm. These new services removed major stops such as Fassifern and Cardiff from the service. Though not nicknamed the Newcastle Flyer, these trains took 2 hours, 23 minutes and 2 hours, 27 minutes respectively, making them the fastest services to date. In 2018, a timetable change reinstated the stops at Fassifern and Cardiff, with the morning service departing Newcastle Interchange 1 minute earlier at 5:02 am and the afternoon service departing Central 5 minutes later at 3:50 pm, though the afternoon service journey times remain unchanged.

== Speed record ==
On 28 June 1964, 3801 hauled a train similar to the late-1940s Newcastle Flyer in a successful attempt to break the Sydney to Newcastle rail record, until then held by a 36 class engine testing for a speed-up of the express in 1938. 3801 established a new record of 2 hours, 1 minute and 51 seconds for the 167 kilometres, and possibly could have made it in a flat two hours except for congestion when the train approached Newcastle Terminal. In October 1988, an XPT shaved 6 minutes and four seconds off the record.

== Heritage trains ==
With the history surrounding one of Australia's most famous named steam services, steam hauled charters often operated between Sydney and Newcastle marketed under the Newcastle Flyer banner with preserved steam locomotives of all three steam classes having operated services. In November 1979, 3214 hauled two excursions to Newcastle to mark the service's 50th anniversary. After their return to service in 1982 and 1986 respectively, 3642 and 3801 operated numerous tours. With the truncation of the Newcastle line to Newcastle Interchange, the final Newcastle Flyer steam special to the original Newcastle railway station operated in October 2014 with 3642.

In October 2022, 3801 hauled a special train from Sydney's Central railway station to the new interchange built at Wickham. This is the first time 3801 has hauled the Newcastle Flyer to the new interchange and 3801’s first visit to Newcastle since 2008.
