= NSW Rail Museum =

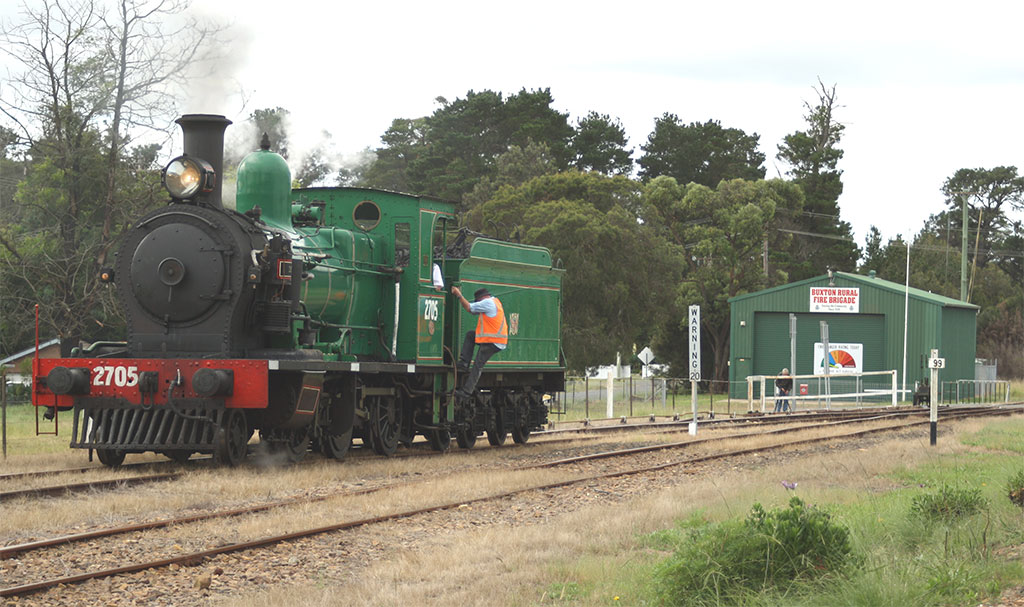
- 2705 at Buxton station in April 2010

- Location in New South Wales
- Former name: New South Wales Rail Transport Museum; Trainworks; Rail Heritage Centre
- Established: 1962
- Location: 10 Barbour Road, Thirlmere, New South Wales, Australia
- Coordinates: 34°12′23″S 150°34′10″E
- Type: Railway museum
- Website: www.nswrailmuseum.com.au

The NSW Rail Museum is a railway museum in New South Wales, Australia. A division of Transport Heritage NSW, it was previously known as the New South Wales Rail Transport Museum, Rail Heritage Centre and Trainworks.

Transport Heritage has divisions located in Thirlmere, New South Wales, where the NSW Rail Museum is dedicated to displaying rolling stock formerly operated by the New South Wales Government Railways (NSWGR) and various private operators. The Blue Mountains division is based at the Valley Heights Locomotive Depot Heritage Museum.

== History ==
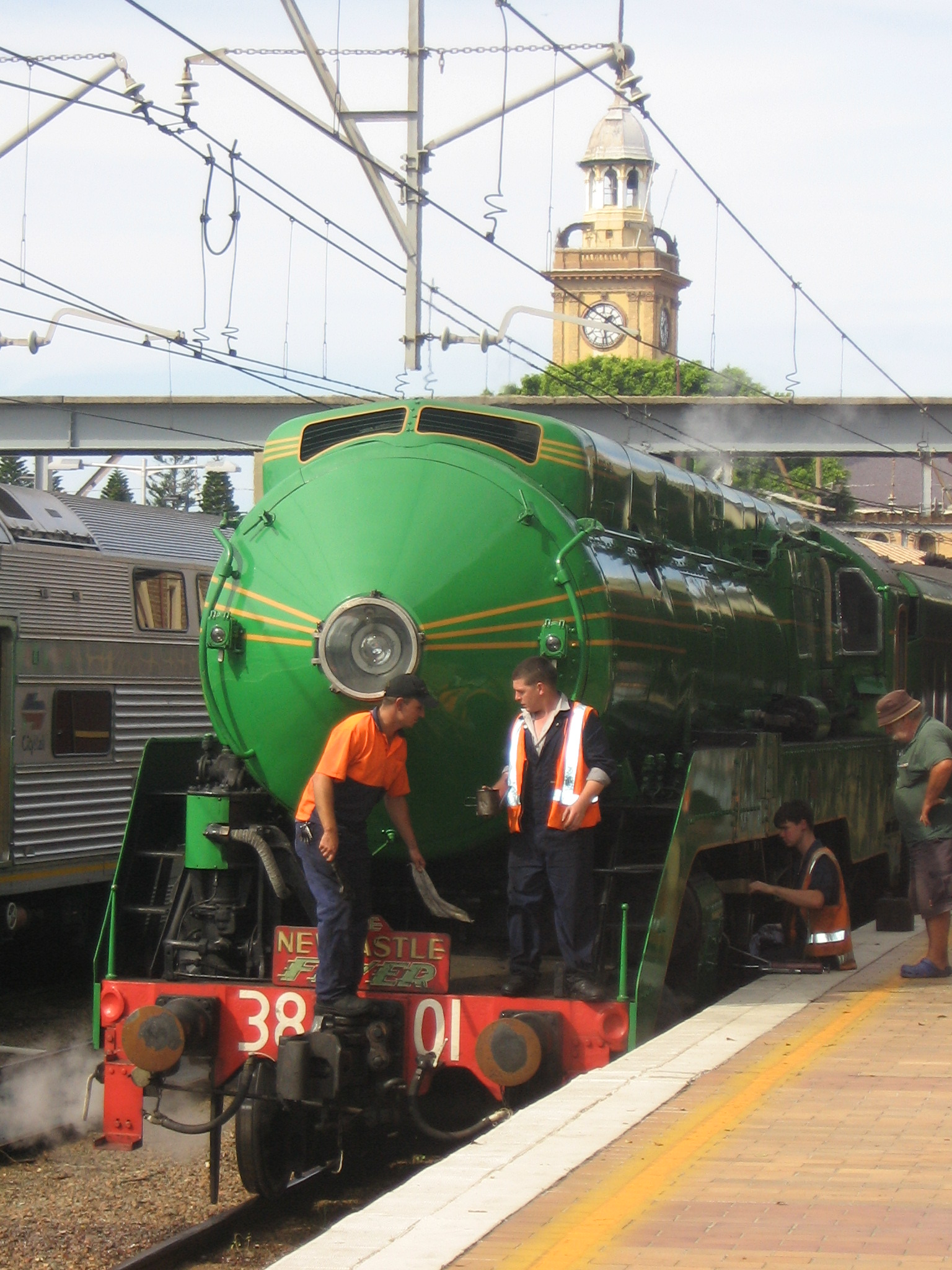
3801 at Newcastle preparing to head south with a Newcastle Flyer special in 2007

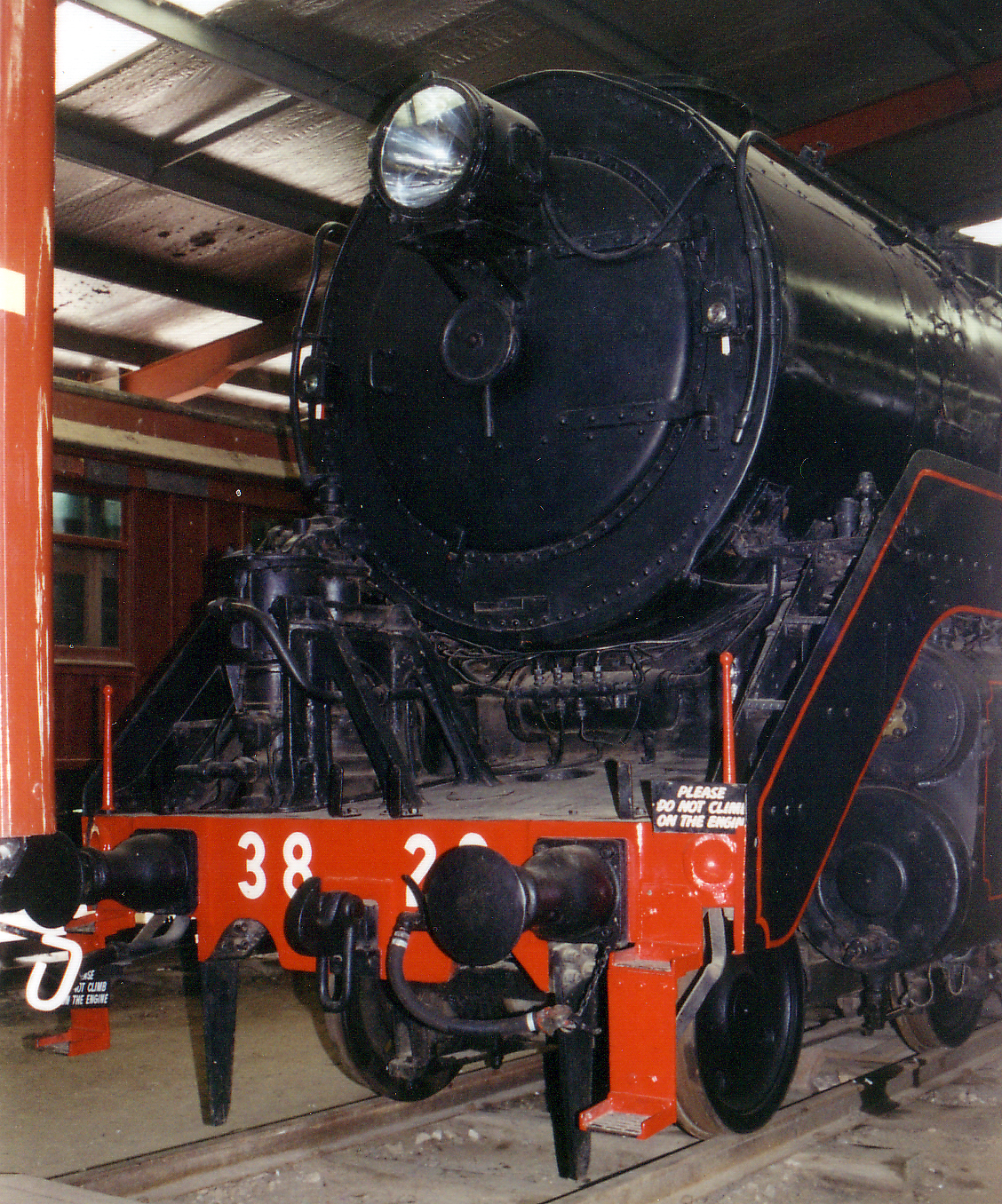
3820 as a static exhibit circa 1991

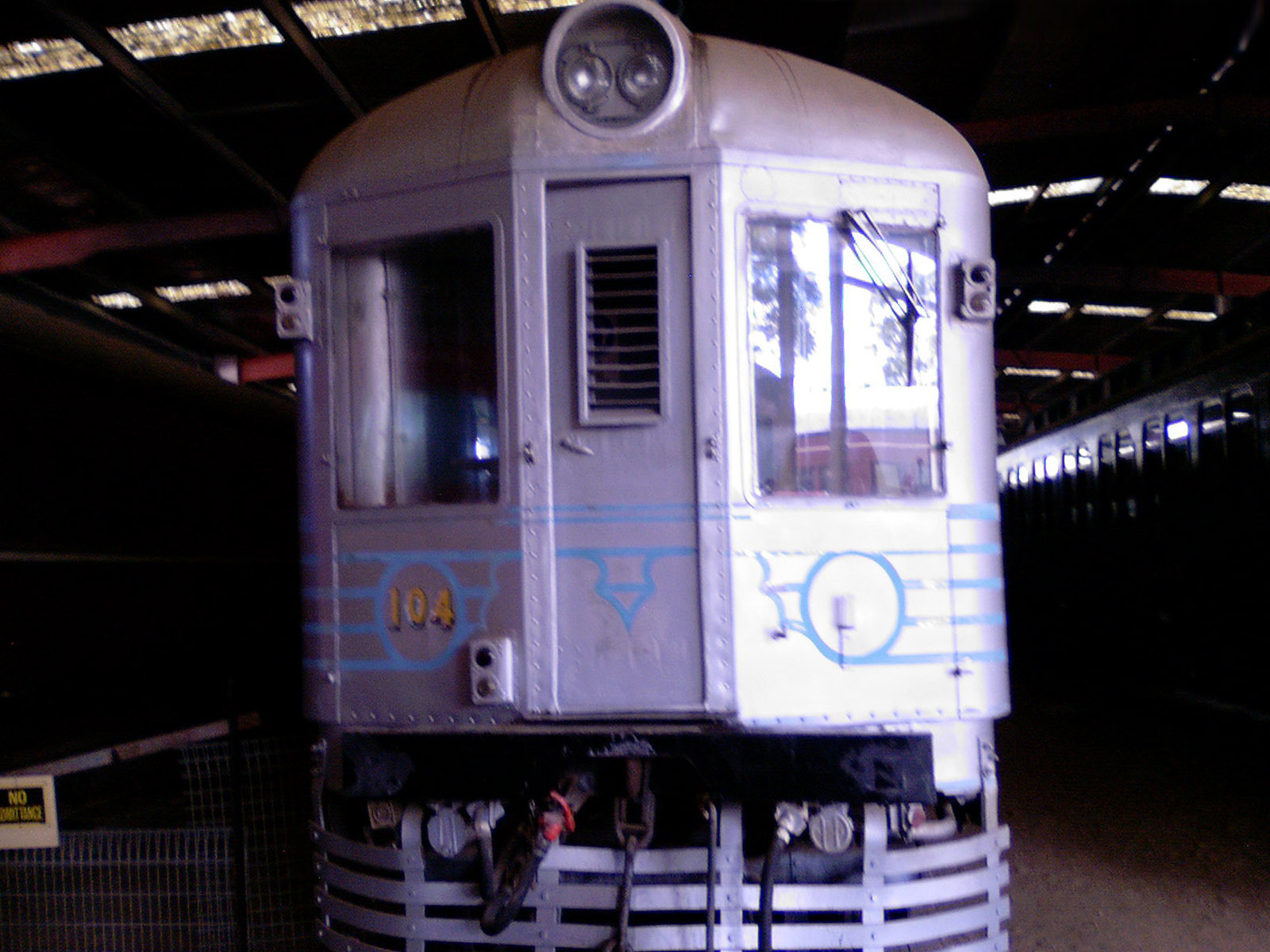
Preserved Silver City Comet power car DP104

The New South Wales Rail Transport Museum (NSWRTM) was established in October 1962 with 62 members. A survey of potential sites around Sydney found Enfield Locomotive Depot to be the most suitable and in 1963 a successful submission was made to the Department of Railways. Under the arrangement the department would retain ownership of the locomotives and rolling stock and responsibility for their maintenance. As Enfield depot was still active, exhibits were sent to Enfield for storage but not able to be accessed. In 1967, the department made an area adjacent to Petersham station available to the museum. The first locomotives outshopped were 3526 and 3609 painted blue and green respectively.

In July 1969, the NSWRTM was able to move into Enfield Roundhouse Number 3 with all exhibits transferred by September. In 1970, the museum was able to relocate into the larger Roundhouse Number 1, allowing the majority of the collection to be stored undercover. In October 1972, the display at Enfield was officially opened by Commissioner for Railways, Neil McCusker.

The NSWRTM had always maintained a good relationship with the Department of Railways, but in October 1972 it was replaced by the Public Transport Commission. The PTC under commissioner Philip Shirley decided it wanted all steam locomotives, including those owned by preservation organisations, off the network with 3820 operating the NSWRTM's last tour to Taree in 1974. The PTC also decided it wanted nothing to do with maintaining the NSWRTM's collection and handed over the exhibits to the museum under a Deed of Gift.

The PTC also wanted to demolish the Enfield roundhouses to make way for a container terminal and offered the museum a site at Thirlmere on the then lightly used Picton – Mittagong loop line. Site clearing began in late 1974 and works were sufficiently advanced for the transfer of stock to begin in June 1975. While some trains were hauled by diesel locomotives, most were worked by the museum's own steam locomotives.

The NSWRTM opened at its current location in on 1 June 1976. Services on the loop line between Thirlmere and Buxton began on 13 June 1976. Initially uncovered, the first section of roofing was completed in 1979. It was over a decade before the whole site was covered.

The PTC relaxed its ban on main line steam in October 1976. 3801 returned to the main line. By the early 1980s it was operating enthusiast journeys on a regular basis including a monthly service from Sydney Central to Thirlmere.

In 1984, the NSWRTM became a founding member of the 3801 Limited managerial board that was created to oversee the operation of the locomotive 3801. Famous British railway locomotive Flying Scotsman visited Thirlmere in March 1989 as part of its tour around Australia.

In 1993, the museum concluded a lease for the 14-kilometre (8.7 mi) Picton – Buxton railway line following its closure by the State Rail Authority.

The NSWRTM was removed as a board member of 3801 Limited in November 2006 after the 20-year lease of 3801 was not renewed. The locomotive was returned to the NSWRTM.

== Redevelopment ==
In 2006, the Government of New South Wales endorsed the Sustainable Rail Heritage Asset Management Strategy to ensure the collection of the State's rail heritage assets are maintained and conserved by dedicated volunteers and shared with the public for current and future generations to appreciate and enjoy. In 2007, RailCorp's Office of Rail Heritage commissioned the development of a concept design for the NSWRTM’s upgrade. This saw ownership in the NSWRTM vested in Trainworks Limited, a 100% subsidiary of RailCorp.

A major redevelopment saw the locomotive depot relocated to a roundhouse built at the southern end of the site opening in November 2009. To create room for stage two of the development of the museum, some of the exhibits were moved to Broadmeadow and Goulburn in 2009. Work on stage two began in December 2009, which included demolition of the existing locomotive maintenance building, construction of a new major exhibits building and other works. The New South Wales Rail Transport Museum re-opened in April 2011.

== Organisation ==
As at 2013, The museum had over 2,300 members, including an active volunteer workforce of over 400 and a small number of full-time staff. It is administered by a voluntary Board and a Management Committee. The museum is accredited as a rail operator under the NSW Rail Safety Act 2002 meaning it has network access rights on the NSW main line rail network. It also has accreditation to operate in Victoria.

== Amalgamation ==
In May 2013, the Minister for Transport, Gladys Berejiklian, announced Transport Heritage NSW, a new not-for-profit company, would be established to manage rail heritage in NSW following an independent review of rail heritage commissioned by the NSW Government. As of 2025, THNSW currently has responsibility for the rebranded NSW Rail Museum and the Valley Heights site.

All assets were transferred to THNSW after the merge.

== Exhibits ==
The museum has an extensive collection of railway locomotives, carriages, wagons and other railway equipment from both the NSWGR and privately operated railways displayed at Thirlmere:

=== Steam locomotives ===
Steam Locomotives
No	Description	Manufacturer	Year	Status	Ref
1021	0-4-0T saddle tank	Manning Wardle	1896	Static exhibit
1033	2-4-0T passenger tank	Beyer, Peacock & Company	1885	Static exhibit
1034	0-4-0T 4T crane	Dübs & Company	1886	Static exhibit
1064	0-4-0 3T coal grab	Alfred Harmon, Melbourne	1918	Static exhibit
1301	4-4-2T passenger	Beyer, Peacock & Company	1877	Static exhibit
1709	4-4-0 passenger	Vulcan Foundry	1887	Static exhibit
1803	0-6-0T passenger	Vulcan Foundry	1884	Painted as Thomas the Tank Engine
1905	0-6-0T goods	Beyer, Peacock & Company	1877	Static exhibit
2029	2-6-4T passenger	Eveleigh Railway Workshops	1911	Static exhibit
2510	2-6-0 goods	Beyer, Peacock & Company	1882	Static exhibit
2705	2-6-0 mixed traffic	Hunslet Engine Company	1913	Operational
3001	4-6-0 mixed traffic	Beyer, Peacock & Company	1903	Operational
3137	4-6-4T passenger	Eveleigh Railway Workshops	1916	Static exhibit
3526	4-6-0 passenger	Eveleigh Railway Workshops	1917	Operational
3616	4-6-0 passenger	Eveleigh Railway Workshops	1928	Stored
3642	4-6-0 passenger	Clyde Engineering	1926	Only in use for special events
3801	4-6-2 express passenger	Clyde Engineering	1943	Operational
3820	4-6-2 express passenger	Eveleigh Railway Workshops	1947	Static exhibit
5595	2-8-0 goods	Clyde Engineering	1912	Static exhibit
5910	2-8-2 goods	Baldwin Locomotive Works	1952	Static exhibit
6029	4-8-4+4-8-4 goods	Beyer, Peacock & Company	1954	Operational
6040	4-8-4+4-8-4 goods	Beyer, Peacock & Company	1956	Static exhibit
18	0-6-0 mixed traffic	Robert Stephenson & Company	1865	Static exhibit
78	0-4-2 mixed traffic	Eveleigh Railway Workshops	1877	Static exhibit
	0-6-4 side tank	Beyer, Peacock & Company	1885	Stored

=== Diesel locomotives ===
- 40 class diesel locomotive 4001
- 42 class diesel locomotive 4201
- 43 class diesel locomotive 4306
- 44 class diesel locomotives 4490
- 442 class diesel locomotive 44211
- 45 class diesel locomotive 4501 and 4520
- 48 class diesel locomotive 4803, 4807 and 4833
- 49 class diesel locomotive 4916
- 86 class electric locomotive 8646
- BHP D1 class D1
- CPH railmotor CPH 13 and CPH 18

=== Other items ===
- A collection of over 18,000 train tickets and passes

== Publications ==
Since December 1962, Roundhouse has been the museum's house organ. It is published quarterly.

== See also ==
- List of transport museums
- Rail transport in New South Wales
