= Enfield Locomotive Depot =

Former train stabling facility in Sydney

Location
- Location: Strathfield South

Characteristics
- Operator: New South Wales Government Railways

The Enfield Locomotive Depot was operated by the New South Wales Government Railways in Strathfield South, Sydney. It was part of the Enfield Marshalling Yards, which covers a considerable area in the west of the modern suburb of Strathfield South. The site is now part of the Enfield Intermodal Logistics Centre.

== History ==
The Enfield Locomotive Depot was the largest locomotive depot on the New South Wales Government Railways' network, being located within the confines of Enfield yard. It would eventually comprise three roundhouses. The Enfield rail yard is in the suburb of Strathfield South, and was named after the former Municipality of Enfield, which governed this area between 1889 and 1949. The modern suburb of Enfield is some distance away to the east.

With dieselisation, a new depot for diesel locomotives, Delec Locomotive Depot opened in 1958. As the steam era grew to a close, the depot gradually closed. In August 1969, the New South Wales Rail Transport Museum moved into Roundhouse 3. In 1973, the Public Transport Commission announced its intention to build a container depot on the site. The New South Wales Rail Transport Museum relocated to Thirlmere in 1975 with the roundhouses then demolished. The former depot is now part of the Enfield Intermodal Logistics Centre, a large rail-to-road container hub. Some remnants of the former depot are preserved on-site.

The turntable from Roundhouse 3 was relocated to the Trainworks Railway Museum.
