= Eveleigh Railway Workshops machinery =

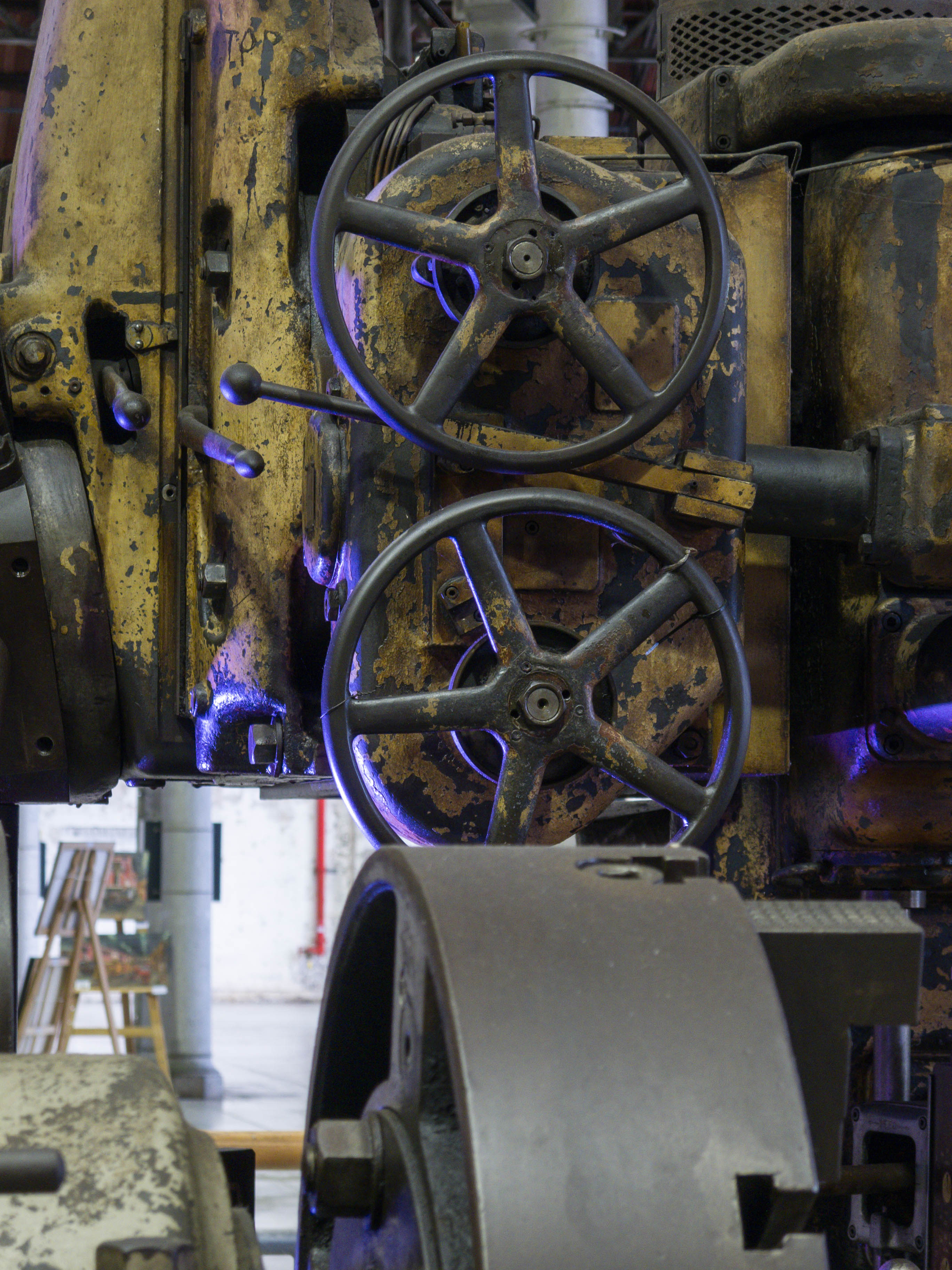
- Machinery in the blacksmiths shop at Eveleigh Railway Workshops

- Location within Sydney Location within Australia
- 33°53′40″S 151°11′46″E
- Location: Main Suburban railway line, Redfern, City of Sydney, New South Wales, Australia

Site notes
- Owner: RailCorp

New South Wales Heritage Register
- Official name: Eveleigh Railway Workshops machinery; Eveleigh Locomotive Workshops machinery
- Type: State heritage (movable / collection)
- Designated: 2 April 1999
- Reference no.: 1141
- Type: Other – Transport – Rail
- Category: Transport – Rail

The Eveleigh Railway Workshops machinery is a heritage-listed former railway workshops machinery located on the Main Suburban railway line in the inner western Sydney suburb of Redfern in the City of Sydney local government area of New South Wales, Australia. It is also known as Eveleigh Locomotive Workshops machinery. The property is owned by Transport for NSW, an agency of the Government of New South Wales. It was added to the New South Wales State Heritage Register on 2 April 1999.

== History ==
Redfern's natural landscape was defined by sand hills and swamps. The Carrahdigang, more widely known as the Cadigal people, valued the area for its abundant supply of food.

The name Redfern originates from an early land grant to William Redfern in 1817. It was previously known as Roberts Farm and Boxley's Swamp. William Redfern (1774–1833) was a surgeon's mate in the Royal Navy and was aboard HMS Standard when its crew took part in the revolt in 1797 known as the Mutiny of the Nore. Because he had advised the men to be more united, he was included among leaders who were court-martialled. Although sentenced to death, he was reprieved because of his youth and in 1801 arrived in Sydney as a convict. He served on Norfolk Island as an assistant surgeon. In 1803 he was pardoned, but remained on the island until 1808, when he returned to Sydney and was appointed assistant surgeon after being examined in medicine and surgery by Surgeons Jamison, Harris and Bohan. In 1816 he took charge of the new Sydney Hospital, but maintained a private practice. In 1814 he reported on conditions on convict transport ships and his recommendation that all have a surgeon on board whose duties were to superintend the health of convicts was put into practice. He resigned from Government service in 1819 when not appointed to succeed D'Arcy Wentworth as principal surgeon. Despite his valuable service, many were contemptuous of him as he was an emancipist, although he had the friendship of Governor Macquarie. In 1818 Redfern received a grant of 526 hectares (1,300 acres) in Airds (in today's Campbelltown area) and later received more land in the area and by his death in 1823 he owned, by grant and purchase, over 9,308 hectares (23,000 acres) in NSW. In 1817 he had been granted 40 hectares (100 acres) in the area of the present suburb of Redfern. The boundaries were approximately the present-day Cleveland, Regent, Redfern and Elizabeth Streets. The commodious home Redfern built on his land was considered to be a country house, surrounded by flower and kitchen gardens. His neighbours were John Baptist (at the 16-hectare (40-acre) Darling Nursery in today's Chippendale) and Captain Cleveland, an officer of the 73rd regiment, remembered by today's street of that name, and before its demolition, by Cleveland House, his home.

The passing of the Sydney Slaughterhouses Act in 1849 brought other businesses to the district. This act banned abattoirs and noxious trades from the city. Tanners, wool scourers and wool-washers, fellmongers, boiling down works and abattoirs had ten years to move their businesses outside city boundaries. Many of the trades moved to Redfern and Waterloo - attracted by the water. The sand hills still existed but by the late 1850s Redfern was a flourishing suburb housing 6500 people.

The Municipalities Act of 1858 gave districts the option of municipal incorporation. Public meetings were held and after a flurry of petitions Redfern Municipality was proclaimed on August 11, 1859, the fourth in Sydney to be formed under the Act. Redfern Town Hall opened in 1870 and the Albert Cricket Ground in 1864. Redfern Post Office came in 1882.

The majority of houses in Redfern in the 1850s were of timber. From the 1850s market gardeners congregated in Alexandria south of McEvoy Street, around Shea's Creek and Bourke Road.

When Sydney's original railway terminus was built in the Cleveland Paddocks, which extended from Devonshire and Cleveland Streets to Chippendale, the station's name was chosen to honour William Redfern. The station was built of iron and the first stationmaster was a Mr Fielding. In 1874 the station was replaced by a brick and stone structure, covering two platforms. At that time the present Redfern station was known as Eveleigh, after a lovely old home standing on the western side of the railway line.

When Central Station was built, on the site of the Devonshire Street cemetery, the name of Eveleigh Station was changed to Redfern. The name Eveleigh was retained for the huge railway workshops, just beyond the station, on the site of the original Hutchinson Estate.

All that remains of the Cleveland Paddocks is Prince Alfred Park, where the exhibition building was erected in 1870 for an inter-colonial exhibition opened by Governor Belmore, after whom Belmore Park was named, on 30 August 1870.

Redfern was the scene of the maiden trip of the first double-decker tram in 1879. It travelled between the old Redfern station to the corner of Hunter and Elizabeth Streets in the city.

In 1885 the Sands Sydney Directory listed 54 market gardens. While many were worked by European-Australians, by the 1870s Chinese market gardeners had acquired leases in the district and a decade later were dominating the trade.

The Eveleigh complex in 1886 became one of the largest employers in the state. Redfern was an industrial working class suburb by the end of the 19th century. Reschs brewery and other factories attracted migrants. The Syrian/Lebanese community began settling around Redfern and Surry Hills by the 1880s.

Redfern at the end of the 19th century was characterised by its many gardens, but at the turn of the century industry was taking over the area. At that time, many businessmen in the area were from Syria, such as George Dan, who established his business in 1890; Stanton and Aziz Melick, in 1888; and Anthony & Simon Coorey, in the 1890s. Like other inner-city suburbs, the area still has a high migrant population, including many now from Lebanon, as well as a large Aboriginal population. There is still industry in the area among the high density residential occupation.

In the 1940s 73 per cent of all industrial activity in Sydney was concentrated within a radius of 6 kilometres (3.5 mi) from Redfern Station.

Many of its services have disappeared or been substantially downgraded over the last couple of decades, even though Redfern is still a densely populated inner city suburb.

== Description ==
Machinery associated with Locomotive Workshops.

== Heritage listing ==
Eveleigh Railway Workshops machinery was listed on the New South Wales State Heritage Register on 2 April 1999.

== See also ==
- South Eveleigh
- Carriageworks
- Eveleigh Railway Workshops
- Eveleigh Carriage Workshops
- Eveleigh Chief Mechanical Engineer's office
