= South Eveleigh =

Suburb of Sydney, New South Wales, Australia

Coordinates: 33°53′41″S 151°11′44″E

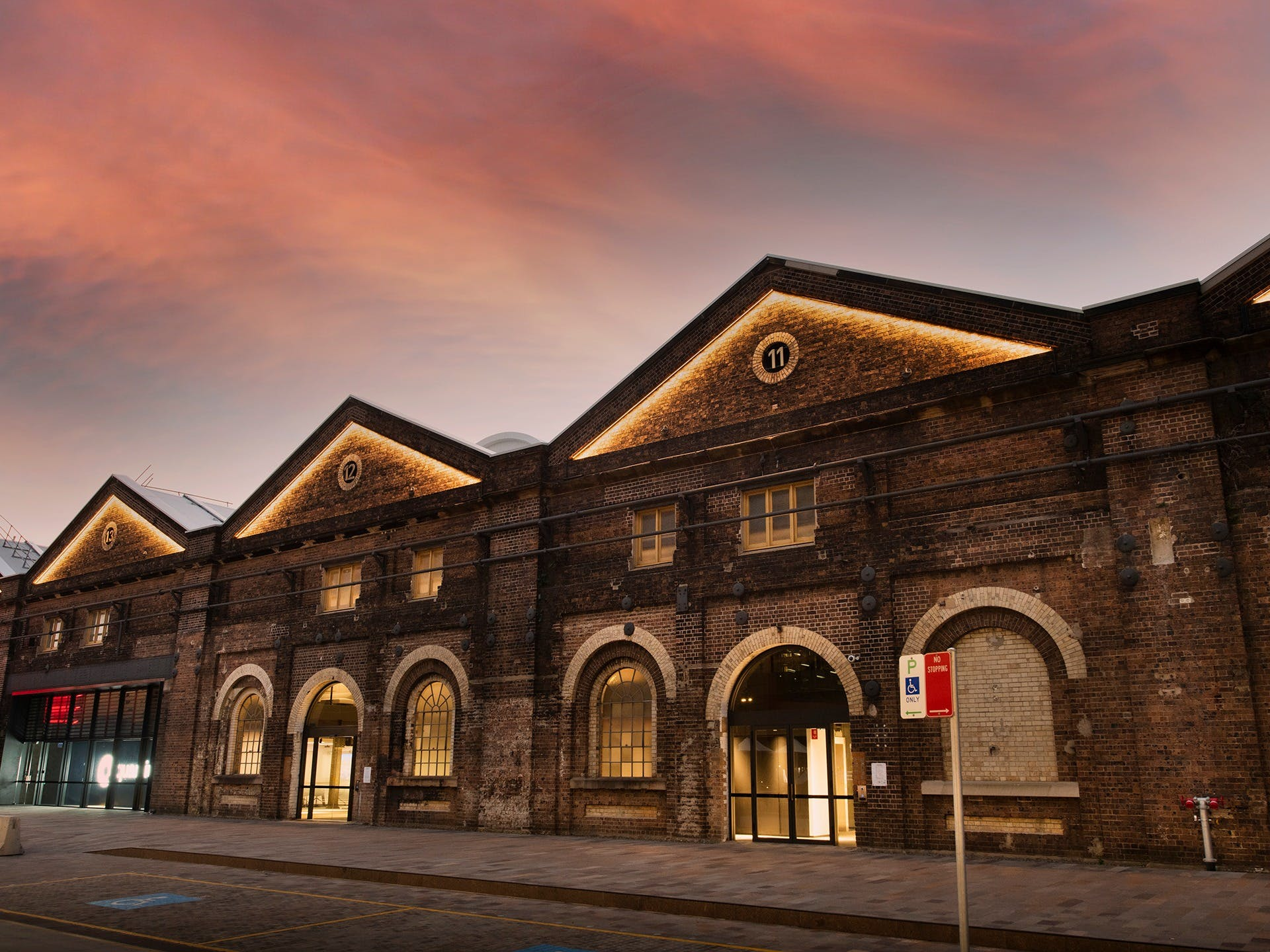
Eveleigh Railway Workshops

South Eveleigh (previously known as Australian Technology Park) is a retail business centre and technology park 3 kilometres (1.9 mi) south of the Sydney central business district and 8 kilometres (5.0 mi) north of Sydney Airport. South Eveleigh borders Alexandria and Eveleigh. Eveleigh Railway Workshops emerged on the site in the 19th century and it was transformed into Australian Technology Park in 1995.

South Eveleigh primarily houses start-up hi-tech companies, especially biotech firms, and spin-offs from university research. The Park also houses venture capital companies, banks and legal firms. It was created in 1995, by the Government of New South Wales, the University of Sydney, University of Technology, Sydney and University of New South Wales, and was originally operated by the Australian Technology Park Sydney Ltd up until 2000, then by the Sydney Harbour Foreshore Authority before operation was passed to the Redfern-Waterloo Authority. The park has encouraged collaborative ventures that maximise the capacity of companies to take products of market driven research through to the commercialisation phase. The intent of the park is for university scientists and engineers to join with industrial scientists and engineers to apply university research ideas in new products and production processes. As such, researchers have been located alongside companies with the capital and expertise to commercialise and export them with the objective of improving Australia's global competitiveness. The park also includes conference, dining and exhibition facilities. Australian Technology Park established strategic alliances with the Oxford Science Park, Technion (Israel Institute of Technology), UCSC Philadelphia and Kyoto Research Park.

Within three and a half years of operation, the Australian Technology Park achieved international status. The Park was also chosen as a benchmark model for Queensland, Victoria and New Zealand, and assisted incubator programs in the region.

In 2015 the site was acquired by Mirvac, to become home to Commonwealth Bank. In 2019 Australian Technology Park was renamed as South Eveleigh to recognise "the significance of the original Eveleigh workshops that provided opportunity to past indigenous generations, and ensuring that they feel a part of its future."

== History and project development ==
Originally called Advanced Technology Park, the Australian Technology Park occupies the site of the former Eveleigh Railway Workshops. Other sites initially considered for the park were the ACI site in Waterloo, the Department of Defence site in Zetland and Homebush Bay. The three universities (University of Sydney, University Technology Sydney and University of New South Wales) favoured the Eveleigh site.

The actual conception of the ATP dates back to as early as May 1989. In 1998, Professor Trevor Cole, the then executive director of The Warren Centre for Advanced Engineering of The University of Sydney was asked to document the early years.

In August 1990, the Business Liaison Office of The University of Sydney prepared a comprehensive report detailing some 'perspectives and recommendations for the establishment of a smart city on the then Eveleigh railway yard site' – this followed an overseas study tour to 15 science parks, principally in the US, but also in the UK (Cambridge), Japan and Sweden.

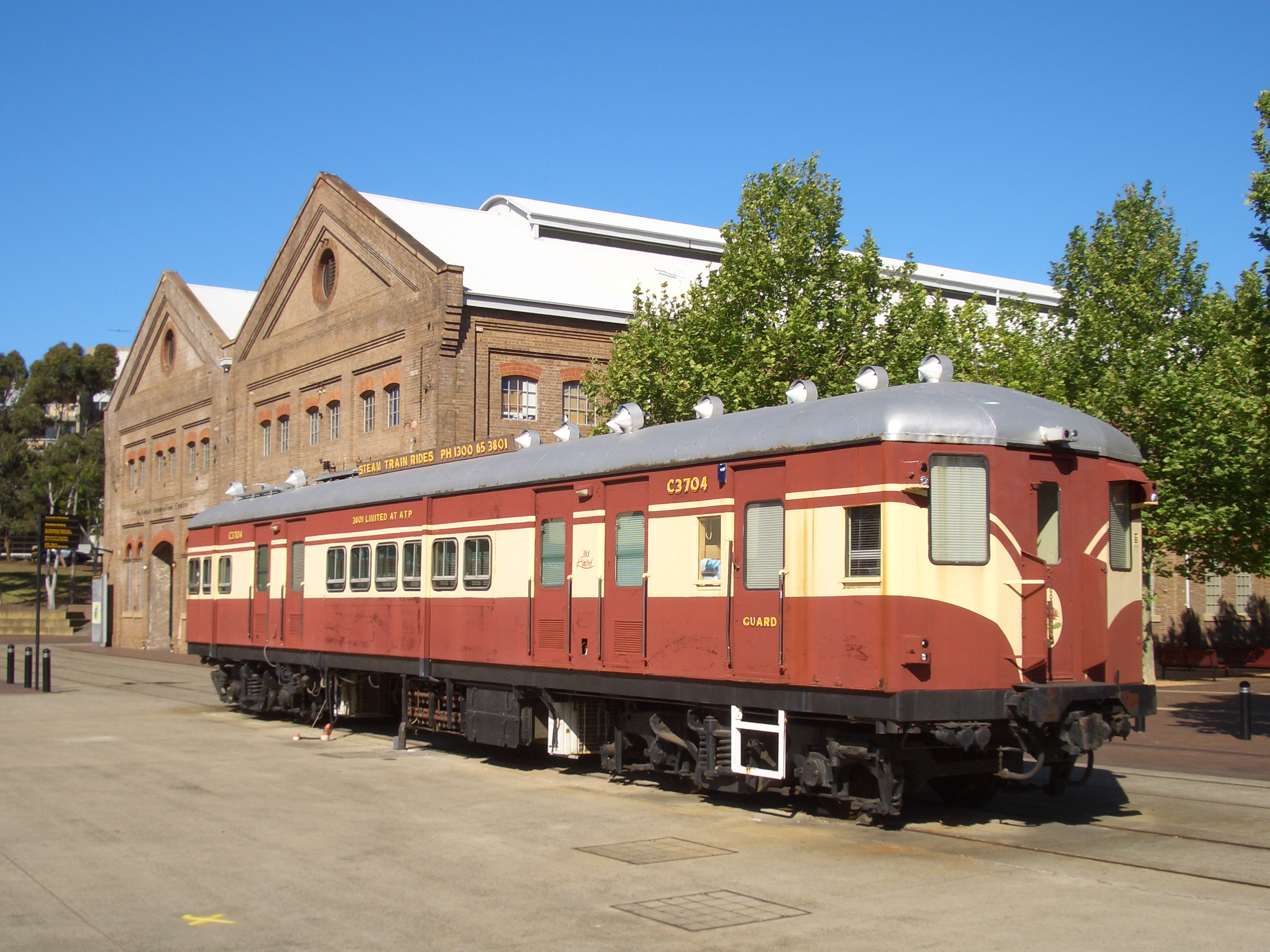
The National Innovation Centre at the Australian Technology Park

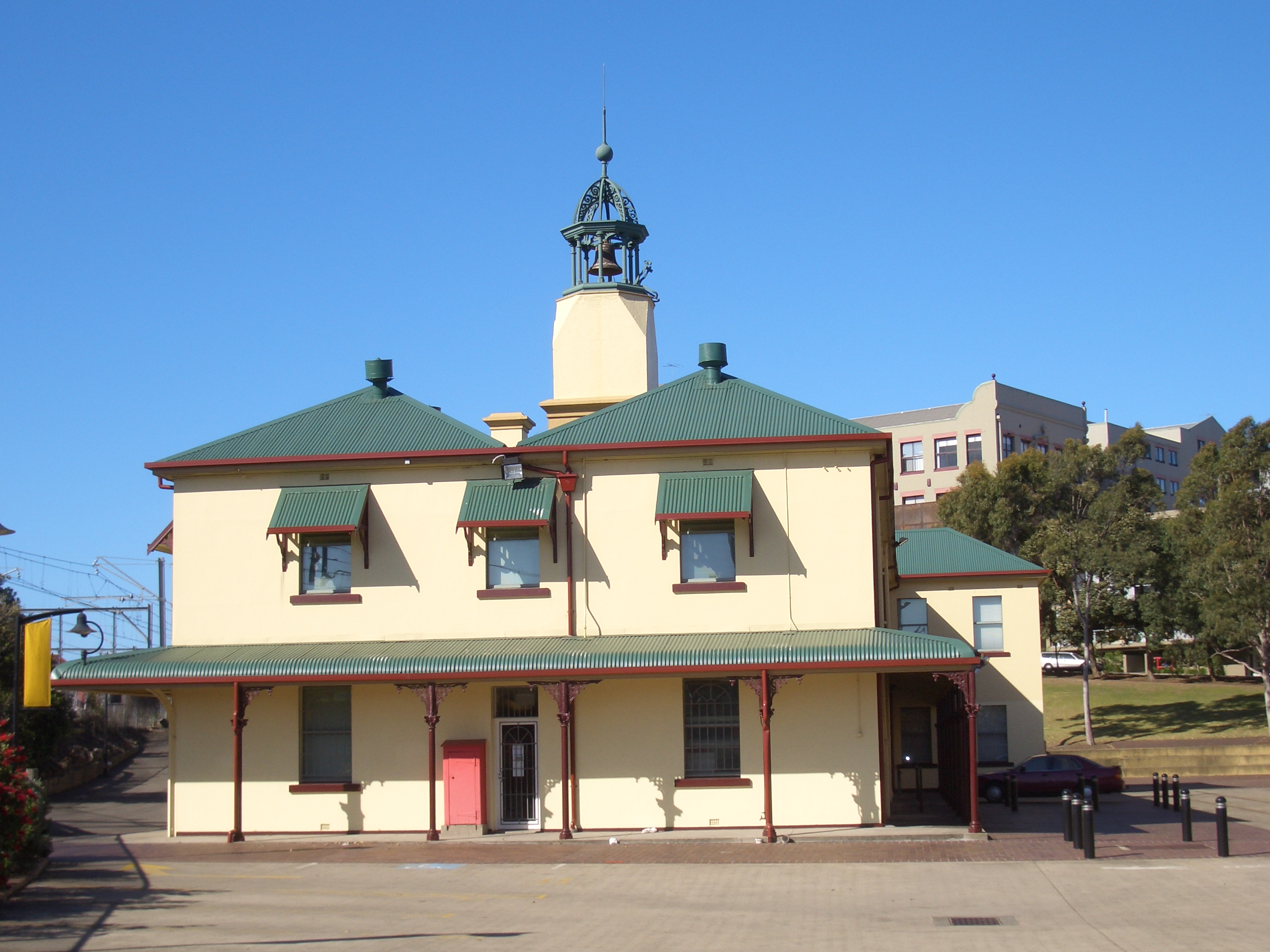
International Business Centre

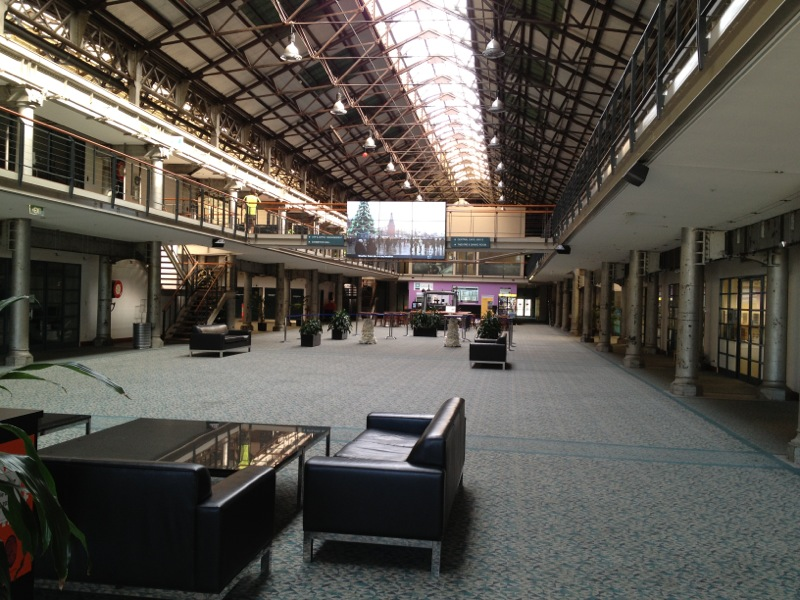
Inside Bay 8 of the Locomotive Workshop

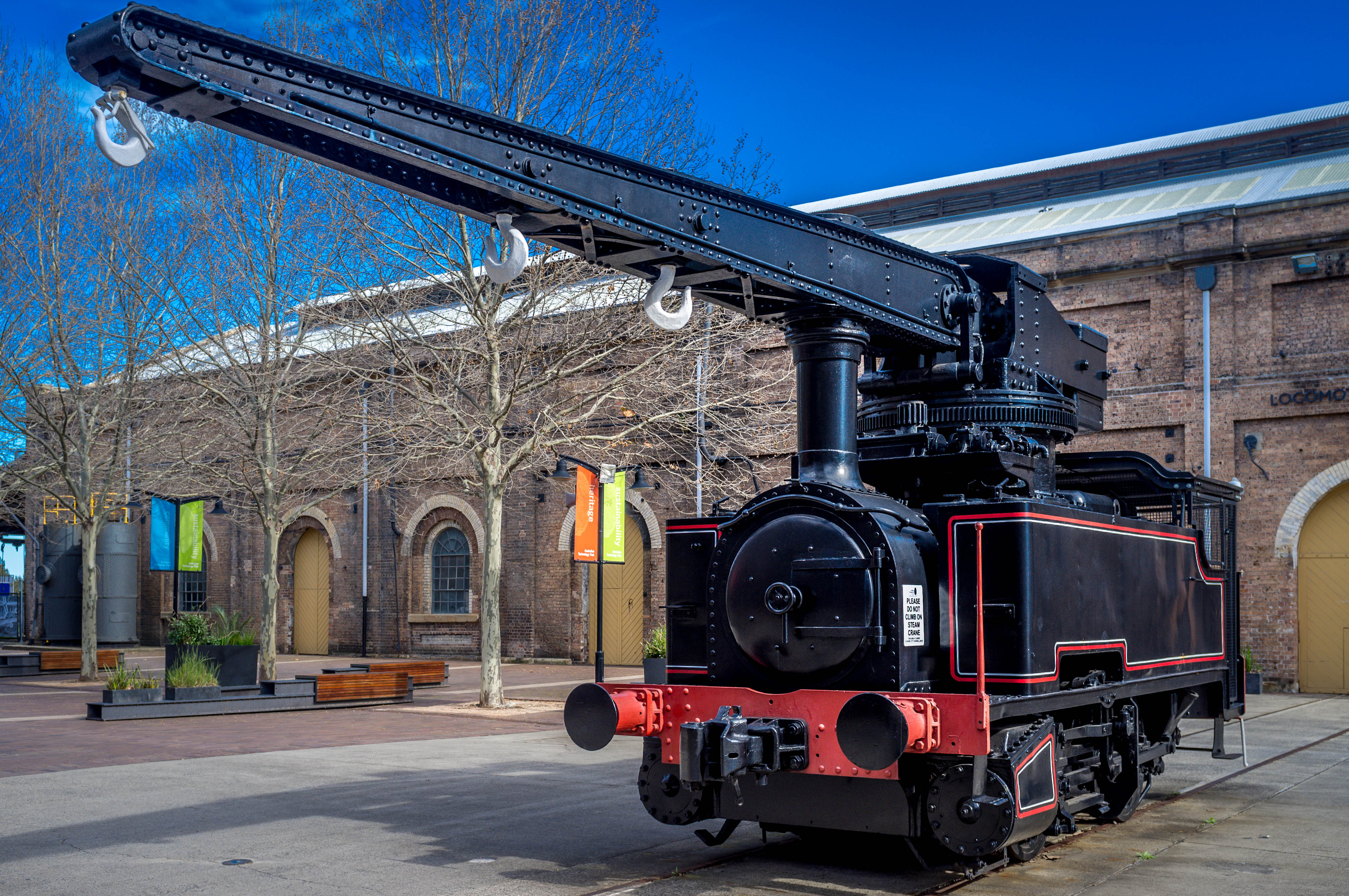
Locomotive Crane Display at Innovation Plaza

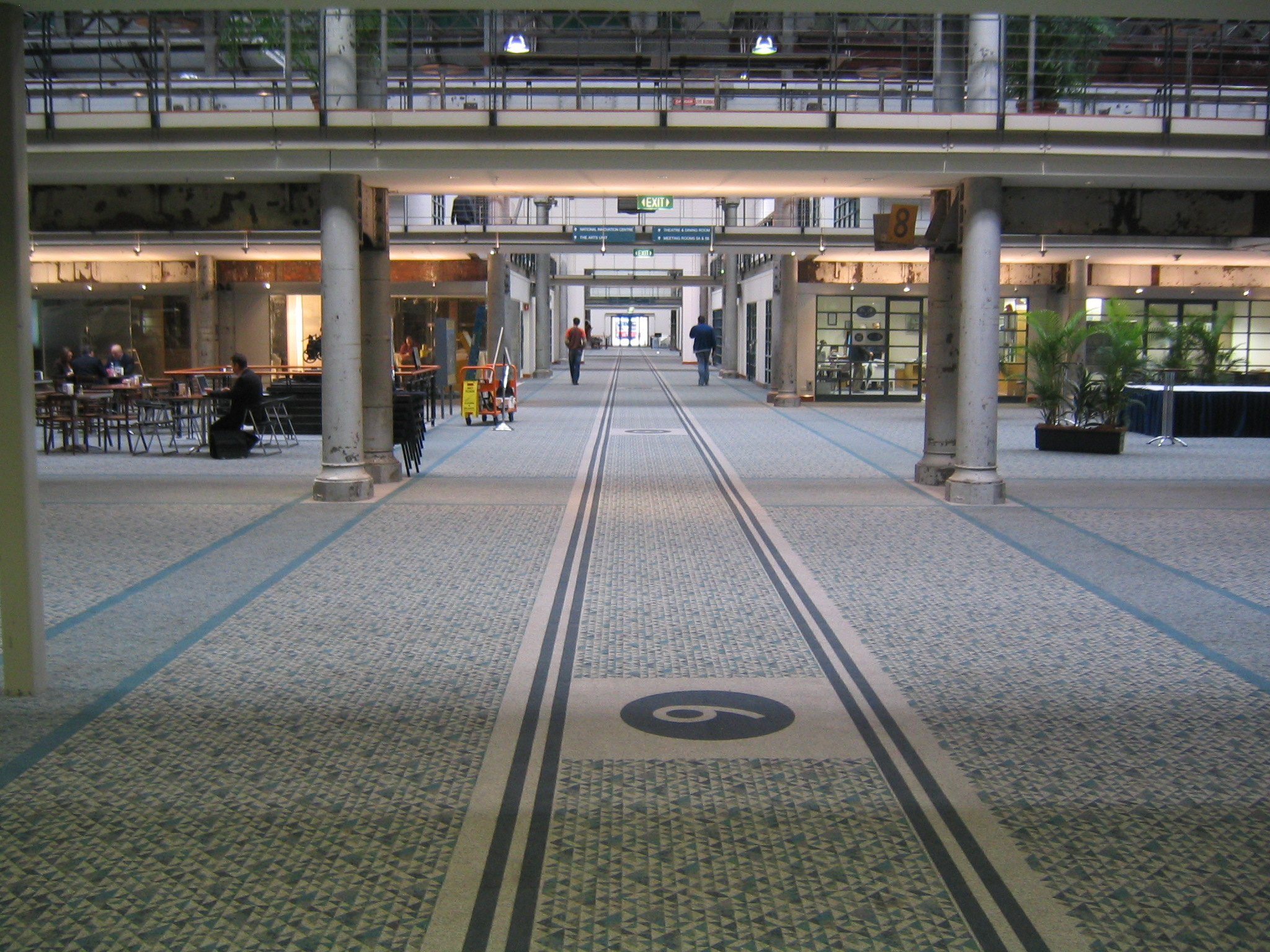
Main walkway inside the Locomotive Workshop

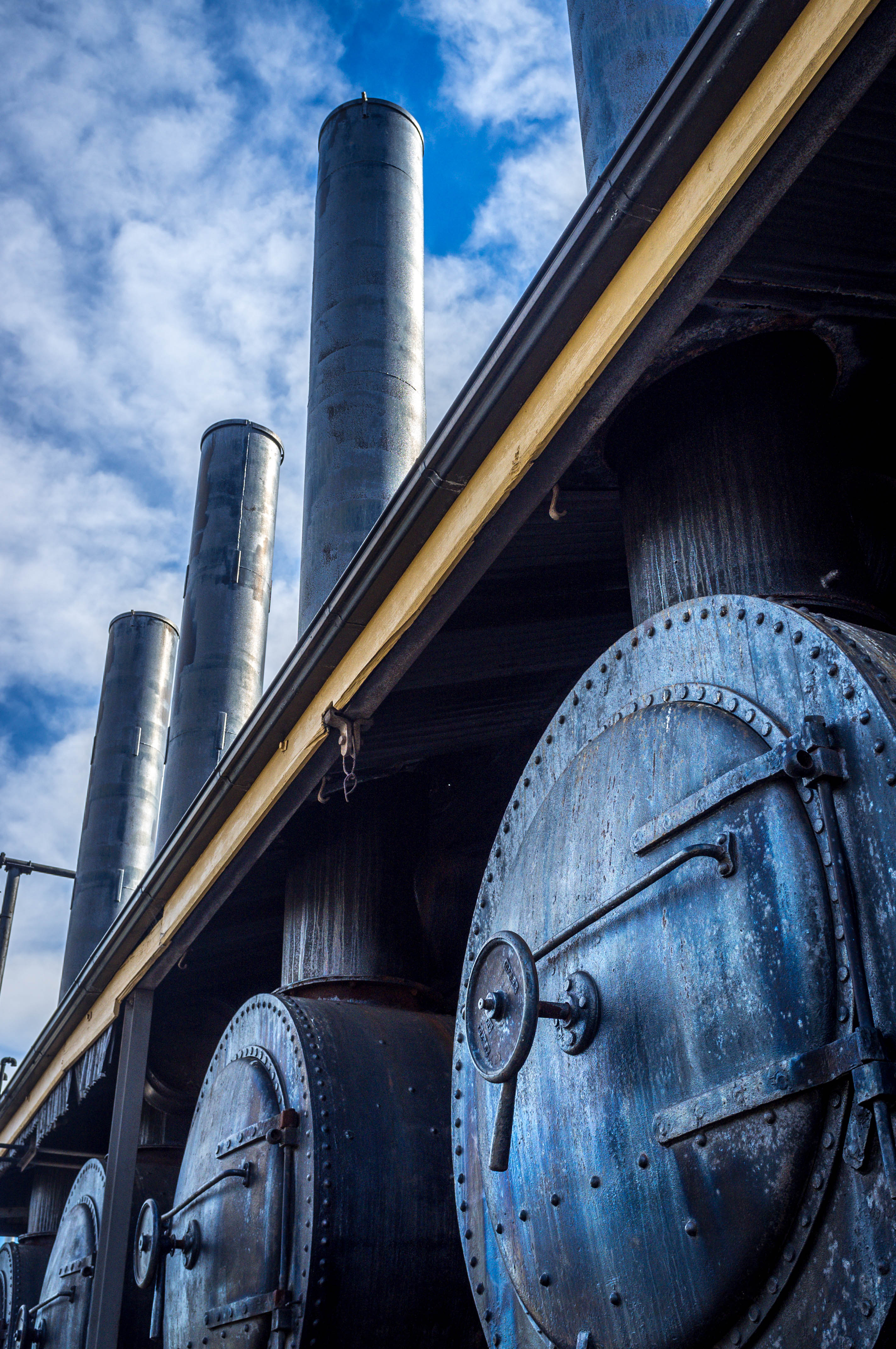
Old Boiler House

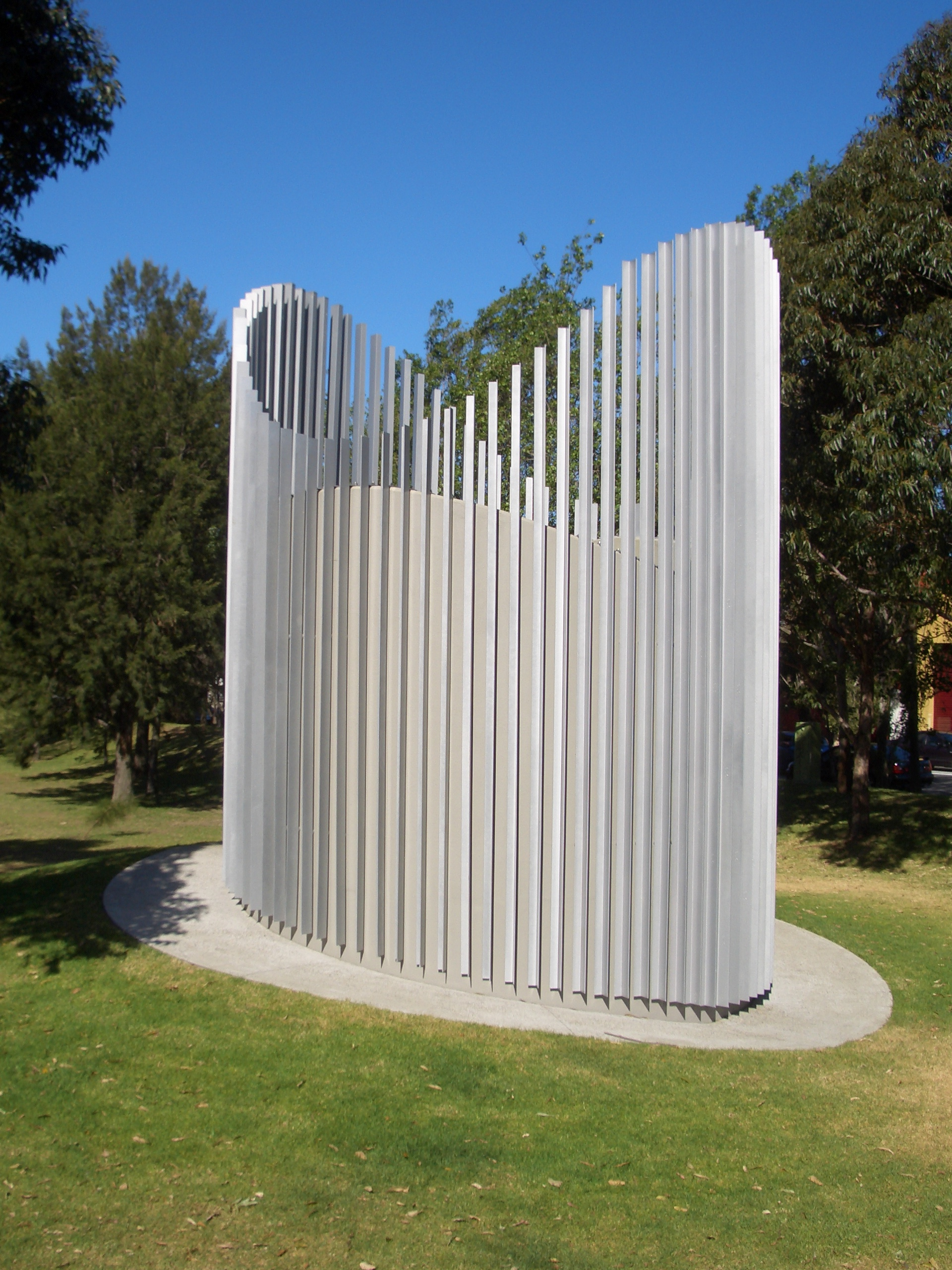
Sculpture in the grounds

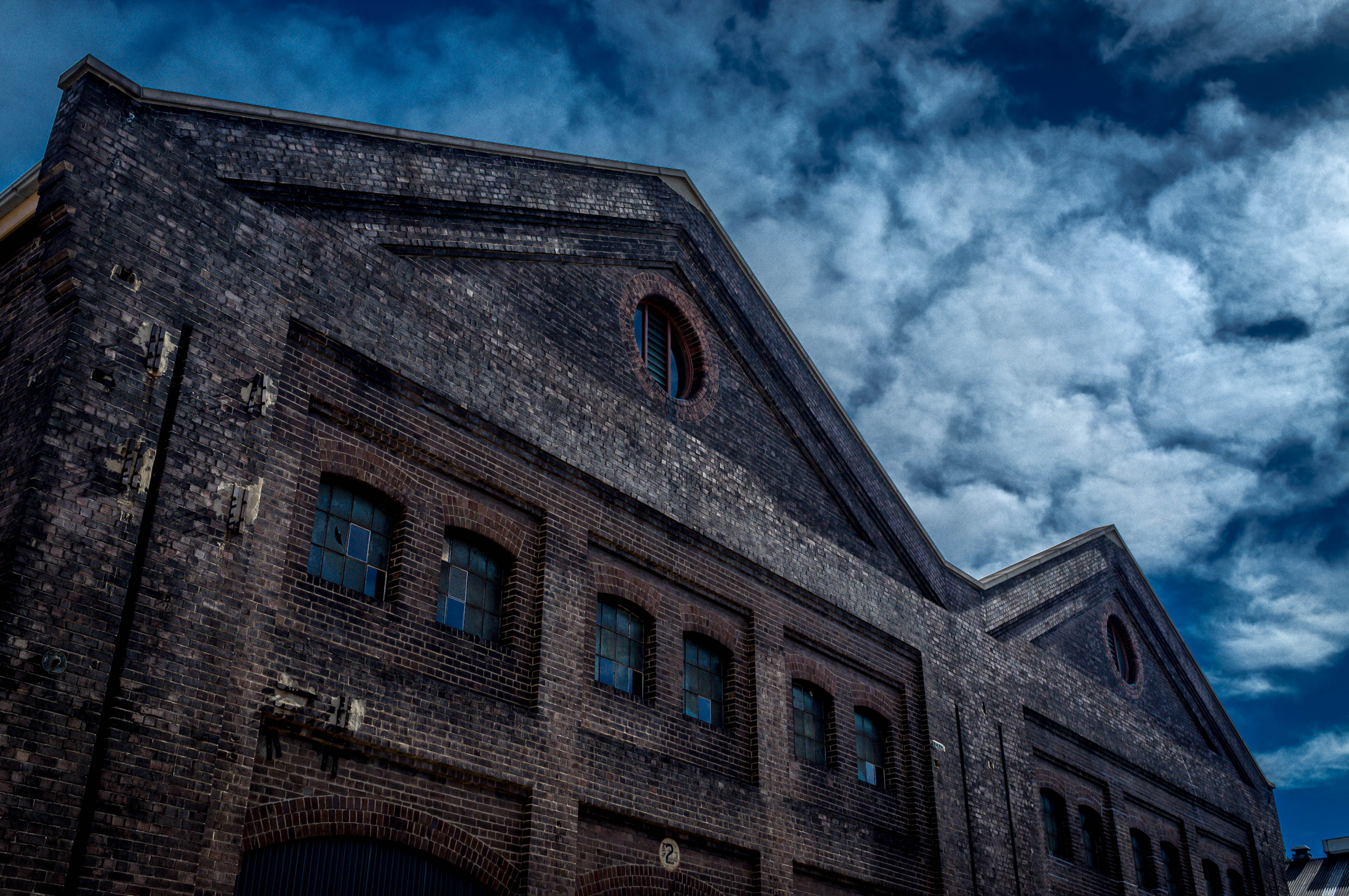
Large Erecting Shop (LES)

The project to create an Australian Technology Park was launched in 1989 when Tom Forgan agreed to provide the related consultancy services to the University of Sydney based on findings from John O’Hara in 1982 on the overseas migration of technology and researchers. The University of Sydney submitted to the State Rail Authority on the potential of the Eveleigh site for such a venture. The site was secured in 1993.

The creation of the Australian Technology Park was spearheaded by the University of Sydney, University Technology Sydney and University of New South Wales. The project's development was led by an Interim Board (later the Board) that was headed by John Conde, and included John Niland (then Vice Chancellor of the University of New South Wales), Gavin Brown (then Vice Chancellor of University of Sydney), RD Guthrie (then Vice Chancellor of University of Technology Sydney), Bruce Jones, Peter Fritz, AJ Gillespie and Thomas John Forgan. Thomas John Forgan then served as executive director of the park, and was tasked with championing the Park, designing its theme and creating industry interest. Forgan was awarded an honorary doctor of engineering by the University of Sydney and an Order of Australia Medal in recognition of his outstanding role.

The Australian Technology Park Interim Board engaged Farrel Management to prepare a business plan. A budget of $22 million over five years was approved by Premier John Fahey on 29 August 1994.

== Public art ==
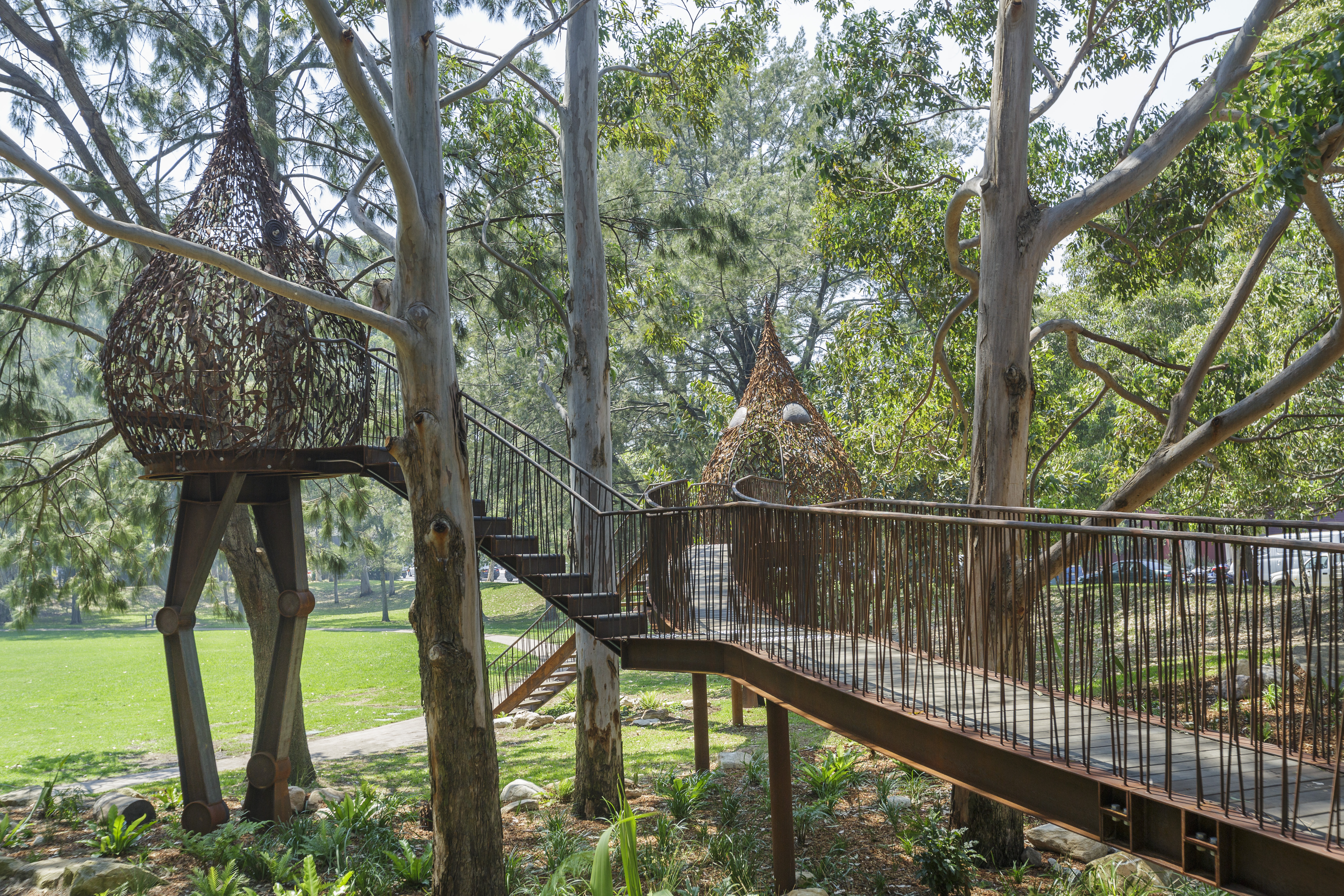
The Eveleigh Tree House by Nell

South Eveleigh is home to large scale public art such as The Interchange Pavilion by Chris Fox located at Village Square, Lobby Art by Jonathan Jones, The Eveleigh Tree House and Happy Rain by Nell.

== Transport ==
The precinct is reachable via public transport via Redfern station or a short walk from Waterloo metro station with parking also available onsite. Transit Systems bus route 308 from Eddy Avenue to Marrickville Metro stops in front of the South Eveleigh precinct.

== Filming ==
In 2024, the Seven Network moved their production studios from Martin Place in Sydney's CBD to South Eveleigh. NEP Group, formally Global Television, also set up studios in one half of the new building.

== Criticism and support ==
Main opposition for the project came from heritage groups, local community, Council of the City of South Sydney, Department of State Development and Department of Planning.

The Department of State Development and Department of Planning expressed concern at the planning stages of the project in relation to the use of the Eveleigh site.

The project received State and Commonwealth political support from John Johnson, Nick Greiner (then Premier of New South Wales), in addition to John Button, Simon Crean, Peter Baldwin, Bob Carr, Michael Easson, Ross Free and Brian Howe. The project secured funds under the Commonwealth's Building Better Cities Program, and a location from Eveleigh Council. The University of Wollongong also endorsed the park's bid to the Premier for HPCC funding based on its assistance in regional incubator programs. The park has also received funding and support from NSW government, Department of Education, Employment Training and Youth Affairs, ETF, SSC, Roads & Traffic Authority, Telstra and AGL Energy. In addition, the project received endorsement from the Japanese consulate.

== See also ==
- Eveleigh Railway Workshops
- Eveleigh Railway Workshops machinery
- Eveleigh Carriage Workshops
- Eveleigh Chief Mechanical Engineer's office
- Carriageworks
