= Eveleigh Chief Mechanical Engineer's office =

Eveleigh Chief Mechanical Engineers office
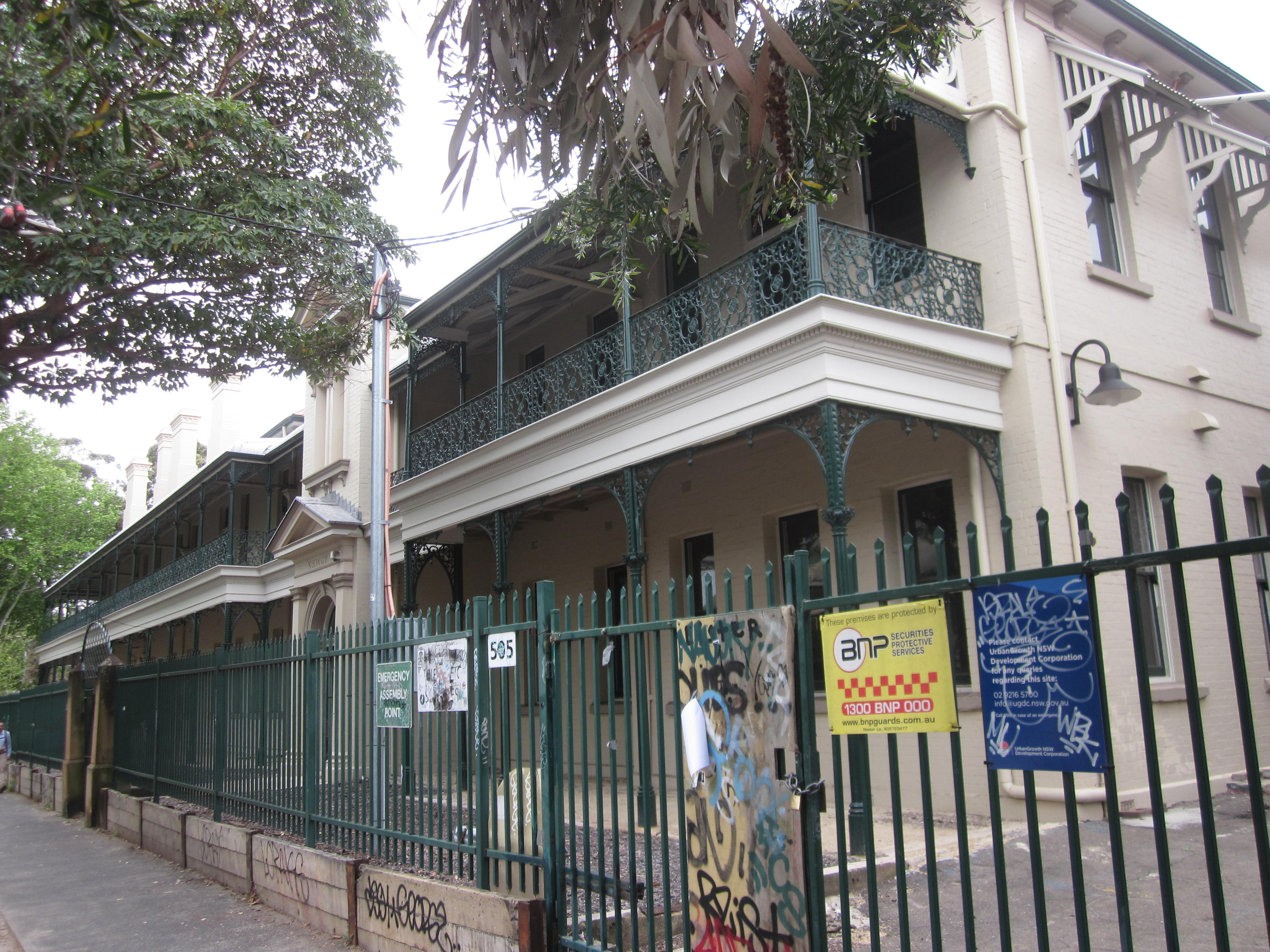
- Eveleigh Chief Mechanical Engineer's office

- Location within Sydney Location within Australia
- 33°53′32″S 151°11′46″E
- Location: Main Suburban railway line, Redfern, City of Sydney, New South Wales, Australia

History
- Built: 1887

Site notes
- Architectural style: Victorian Filigree
- Owner: Transport for NSW

New South Wales Heritage Register
- Official name: Eveleigh Chief Mechanical Engineers office and movable relics; Sydney Technology Park
- Type: State heritage (built)
- Designated: 2 April 1999
- Reference no.: 1139
- Type: Office building
- Category: Government and Administration

The Eveleigh Chief Mechanical Engineers office is a heritage-listed former engineer's office and now unused building located at Main Suburban railway line in the inner western Sydney suburb of Redfern in the City of Sydney local government area of New South Wales, Australia. The building fronts 505 Wilson Street, opposite Shepherds Lane, Eveleigh. It was built in 1887. It is also known as Eveleigh Chief Mechanical Engineers office and movable relics and Sydney Technology Park. The property is owned by Transport for NSW, an agency of the Government of New South Wales. It was added to the New South Wales State Heritage Register on 2 April 1999.

== History ==
The Chief Mechanical Engineers Office was constructed in c. 1887 as part of the expansion of the Eveleigh Workshops. The building was extended to the east in c.1900, almost doubling in size. A small extension was carried out to the southern side c. 1920.

When John Whitton first conceived the idea of the Eveleigh Railway Workshops, they were to undertake the construction of the infrastructure of the railways including the safe working systems and some of the perway systems. However, their main tasks were the maintenance and repair of locomotives and railway stock and the manufacture of rolling stock such as wagons and passenger carriages. At the time there were no other facilities in NSW for the construction of locomotives.

The workshops were set up on both the north and the south sides of the main western and southern railway lines, which led to a duplication of some workshop functions, but the really heavy work such as forging and casting of ferrous and non-ferrous metal, was to be carried out on the locomotive side. When the workshops were established most of the rolling stock had a wooden chassis, so the separation of services was not a major impediment to production.

The site for the Eveleigh railway yards was chosen in 1875, resumed in 1878 and the compensation price settled in 1880. Approximately A£100,000 was paid for 26 hectares (64.5 acres) of land. Clearance began two years later. Much work went into the design and construction of the buildings because of the sandy nature of the soil. In the meantime, Eveleigh Station had been opened in 1878. In 1906 it was renamed Redfern Station. The former Redfern Station was renamed Sydney Terminal (Central).

The Engine Running Shed, now demolished, was the first building completed. Cowdery was criticised for the extravagance of this building. It comprised three segmental arched bays, each covering seven "roads" without intervening columns.

George Fishburn was awarded the contract for bays 1–4 of the Locomotive Workshops in 1884 and work was commenced soon after. They were officially opened in 1887. Workshops 5-15 were opened later in the year. This initial building phase also included the construction of bays 16-25 of the Carriage Sheds, the Paint Shop, a General Store and various smaller buildings and the associated turntables, traversers and rail lines. Development continued into the 1890s. The workshops were open every day of the week until 1892 when union negotiations led to the workshops being closed on Saturdays.

The residential development of the area proceeded in the 1870s and 1880s around the railway workshop and was stimulated by the need for housing generated by the workshops. The names of many early settlers are continued in the street names in the area, including Eveleigh, and many of the property boundaries and former watercourses are reflected in street patterns. At the time of the development of the railway workshops, Darlington School was also built, as were other municipal buildings since demolished for the university.

For some time Eveleigh had its own gas works which were located near MacDonaldtown Station. However, in 1901 with the establishment of Ultimo Power Station which belonged to the Rail and Tramway Department, electric power was made available to the workshops. Shortly after work commenced on the conversion of the rope-driven cranes to electric motor drives. Work also commenced on the replacement of the steam engines at the south end of the workshops by powerful electric motors. This, however, was not completed until 1914.

In 1907 the Commissioners for Railways decided to begin the manufacture of new locomotives at Eveleigh and the New Locomotive Shop was designed and constructed for this purpose.

A Public Works Annual Report in 1915 concluded that the Eveleigh Works were too congested and recommended the establishment of a new locomotive and repairing works. Adding to this situation, strained conditions led to eight strikes at Eveleigh between July 1915 and July 1917. In 1916 James Fraser, Acting Chief Commissioner, addressed workers at Eveleigh on the introduction of the Taylor card system. The introduction of this system on 2 August 1917 led to an 82-day general strike. It began when 1100 men struck at Randwick Tramway Depot and 3000 at Eveleigh. Volunteers kept trains running including boys from Newington and Shore independent schools at Eveleigh.

This all took place during the World War I which brought worse conditions and declining wages.

The rail yards continued to develop. Additional land was resumed to the south-west and 230 houses were demolished to allow for the construction of the Alexandria Goods Yard sometime around 1917.

During 1925 the manufacture of new locomotives ceased.

As a result of World War II, bays 5–6 were cleared of machinery in 1940 and plans drawn up for the installation of equipment supplied by the Department of Defence for the manufacture of 25lb field gun-shells. A mezzanine floor was added to Bay 5 in 1941 and the machinery for shell manufacture installed by February. Bay 8 was altered for an ammunitions annex. By 1943 Bay 8 had been abandoned by the Department of Defence as it had organised its own factories. Production of the shells ceased in 1945 and the construction of new locomotives was reintroduced. This post-war locomotive manufacturing lasted until 1952 when Eveleigh once again became a repair and maintenance facility. The decision to abandon steam locomotives in 1963 meant that Eveleigh, which was dedicated to steam locomotive maintenance and repair, entered its final phase.

The yards continued to grow and expand, and functions were continually changing. In later years workshops at Chullora in 1937 and later Clyde took over aspects of work formerly performed at Eveleigh and functions were rearranged accordingly.

Re-organisation and attempts at modernisation in the 1970s came too late. Too much of the machinery was suited only to the steam locomotive era. Buildings containing old equipment, machinery which had become progressively inappropriate to a modern transport era, and a changing work culture, has seen the yards decline gradually in the late 20th century until its closure in 1988. After closure, bays 5–15 were used by Paddy's Markets while other buildings on the site were demolished over an extended period. These included the Pattern Shed, Foundry, Smith's Shops and the Wheelpress Shop. In 1991 the NSW Government announced the creation of a technology park at Eveleigh in association with the University of NSW, the University of Sydney and the University of Technology Sydney. Decontamination works were carried out to cleared areas of the site progressively.

In 1994 Paddy's Markets returned to Haymarket. City West Development Corporation took ownership of the Locomotive Workshops, bays 1–15, in addition to the New Locomotive Shed and the Manager's Office.

Today the functions formerly carried out at Eveleigh are no longer carried out by government enterprises or no longer carried out in Australia.

Although it has stood empty for a decade, the Chief Mechanical Engineer's Office is to undergo specialist heritage restoration as part of a key heritage project, the Central to Eveleigh Urban Transformation and Transport program. Works will see the building be made secure, with external restoration of the balcony, paintwork, windows, latticework and connection to utilities. The project is expected to be completed by mid-2017, in the meantime the site will be enclosed with safety mesh and scaffolding.

== Description ==
=== Garden ===
Once famous for its extensive and elaborate grounds, these have been neglected and comprise chiefly now of open space, unkept grass and a row of mature, formerly-pollarded London or hybrid plane trees (Platanus x hybrida) lining Wilson Street, Redfern. An interpretive sign adjacent to the main pedestrian stairway entrance to Carriage Works, to the west, has a copy of a photograph of the elaborate Chief Mechanical Engineer's Office gardens at their peak.

=== Exterior ===
The CME's office is a large two-storey building constructed of brick. Externally, the building is almost unaltered since the 1920s. It includes the original 1887, 1900 and 1920 stages, all of which stylistically harmonise to create one overall composition.

There is a central entry portico with a pointed arch pediment with the letters "NSWGR" above the doorway. The roof is hipped and clad in corrugated iron with brick corbelled chimneys. The eaves feature a dentilled cornice. The two-storey bullnose verandah runs the length of the building with cast iron columns and decorative iron brackets and balustrade. The front door features an arched fanlight. The ground floor features timber double-hung sash windows (mostly boarded up). The first floor features timber French doors. A modern steel picket fence on concrete plinth fronts on to Wilson St. There are two stone posts supporting which appear original and support a modern iron picket gate. A number of mature trees are located in the front garden along Wilson Street.

=== Interior ===
Internally the building has been largely altered with later office partitioning and modern ceilings. However, a number of original features remain including the central timber staircase, marble mantelpieces, decorative plaster cornices and archways, tiled bathrooms, tessellated tiles to entry and bathrooms, timber panelled doors, "mini-orb" and "lath and plaster" ceilings.

=== Moveable items ===
Moveable items include a toilet bowl with counterweight seat, (AA24); a wall mirror timber frame, 0.6/1.0, (AM06); and a timber plan cabinet, 6 draws, 1.5/0.9/0.9, (PA08).

=== Condition ===
As at 4 September 2013, the exterior was moderate to poor condition; and the interior was poor to very poor condition.

=== Modifications and dates ===
- 1900–1920 – Additions

== Heritage listing ==
As at 4 September 2013, the building is a very fine late Victorian railways office on a scale above all other such structures in the State. The building reflects the importance of the railway engineers in the development of the State and its closeness to the Eveleigh workshops (mainly under the control of the Mechanical Branch) indicates the confidence in railway construction. The building is in a style not often seen in Sydney and is a rare survivor. More often this form of building is in evidence in the country where the pressure of development is less. It is an important element in the town and streetscape of Wilson St, Redfern, particularly its close proximity to the railway workshops.

Eveleigh Chief Mechanical Engineers office was listed on the New South Wales State Heritage Register on 2 April 1999 having satisfied the following criteria.

The place is important in demonstrating aesthetic characteristics and/or a high degree of creative or technical achievement in New South Wales.

The Chief Mechanical Engineers Building, is perhaps the grandest building of the workshops group and provides a fine example of a late Victorian railway office building.

The place possesses uncommon, rare or endangered aspects of the cultural or natural history of New South Wales.

This item is assessed as historically rare. This item is assessed as scientifically rare. This item is assessed as arch. rare. This item is assessed as socially rare.

== See also ==
- Australian Technology Park
- Carriageworks
- Eveleigh Railway Workshops
- Eveleigh Railway Workshops machinery
- Eveleigh Carriage Workshops
