= Eveleigh Railway Workshops =

Heritage listed former railway works in Sydney, New South Wales

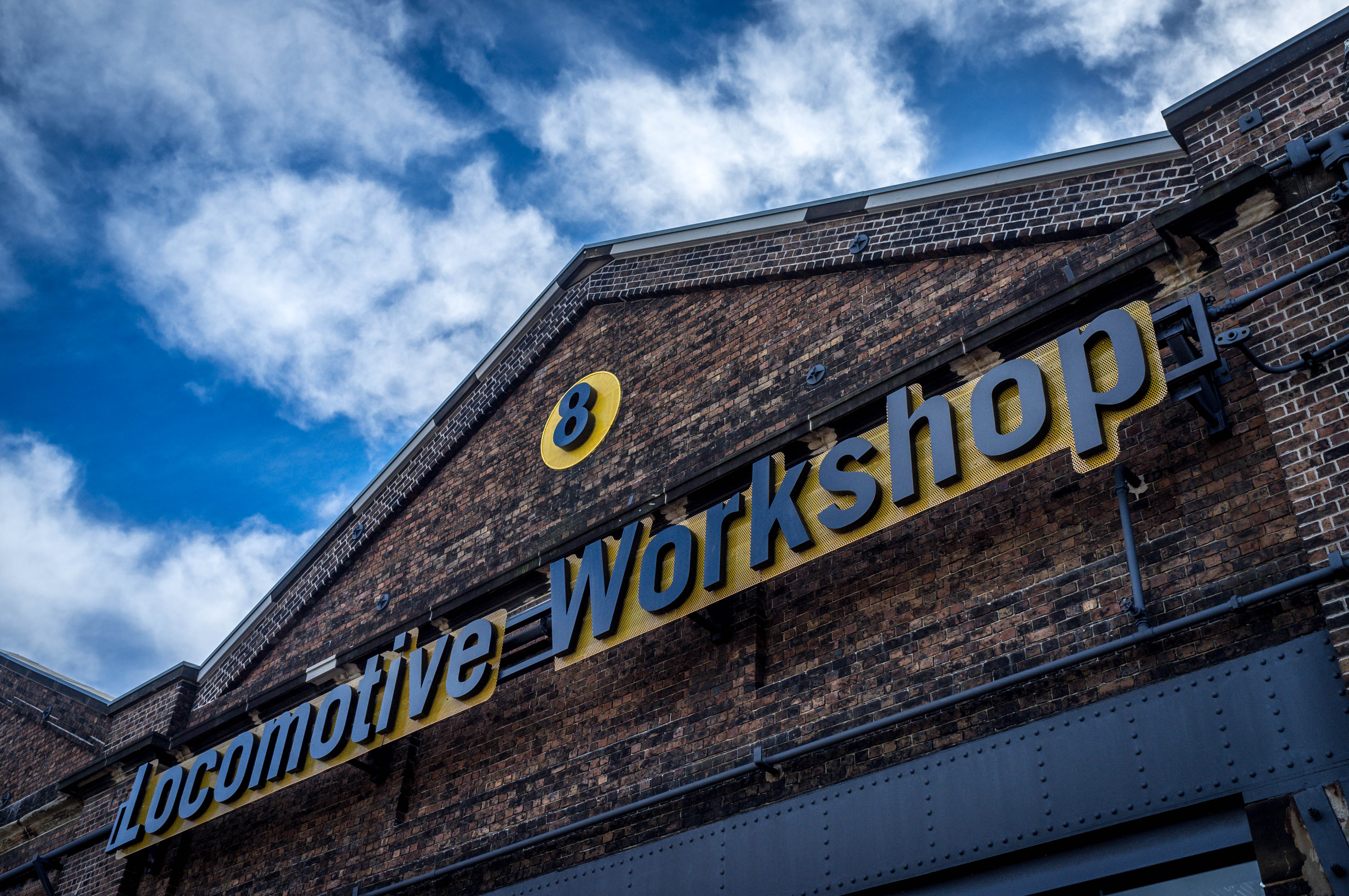
- The former Eveleigh Railway Workshops, now Australian Technology Park

- Location in Greater Sydney
- Built: 1882–1897
- Operated: 1882–1988
- Location: Sydney, New South Wales, Australia
- Coordinates: 33°53′40″S 151°11′44″E
- Industry: Railway
- Architect: John Whitton (architect); George Cowdery (designer); George Fishburn (builder)
- Area: located within the 51-hectare (130-acre) Eveleigh Complex
- Defunct: Closed in 1988 and repurposed ss public housing, Australian Technology Park and other uses

Eveleigh Railway Workshops
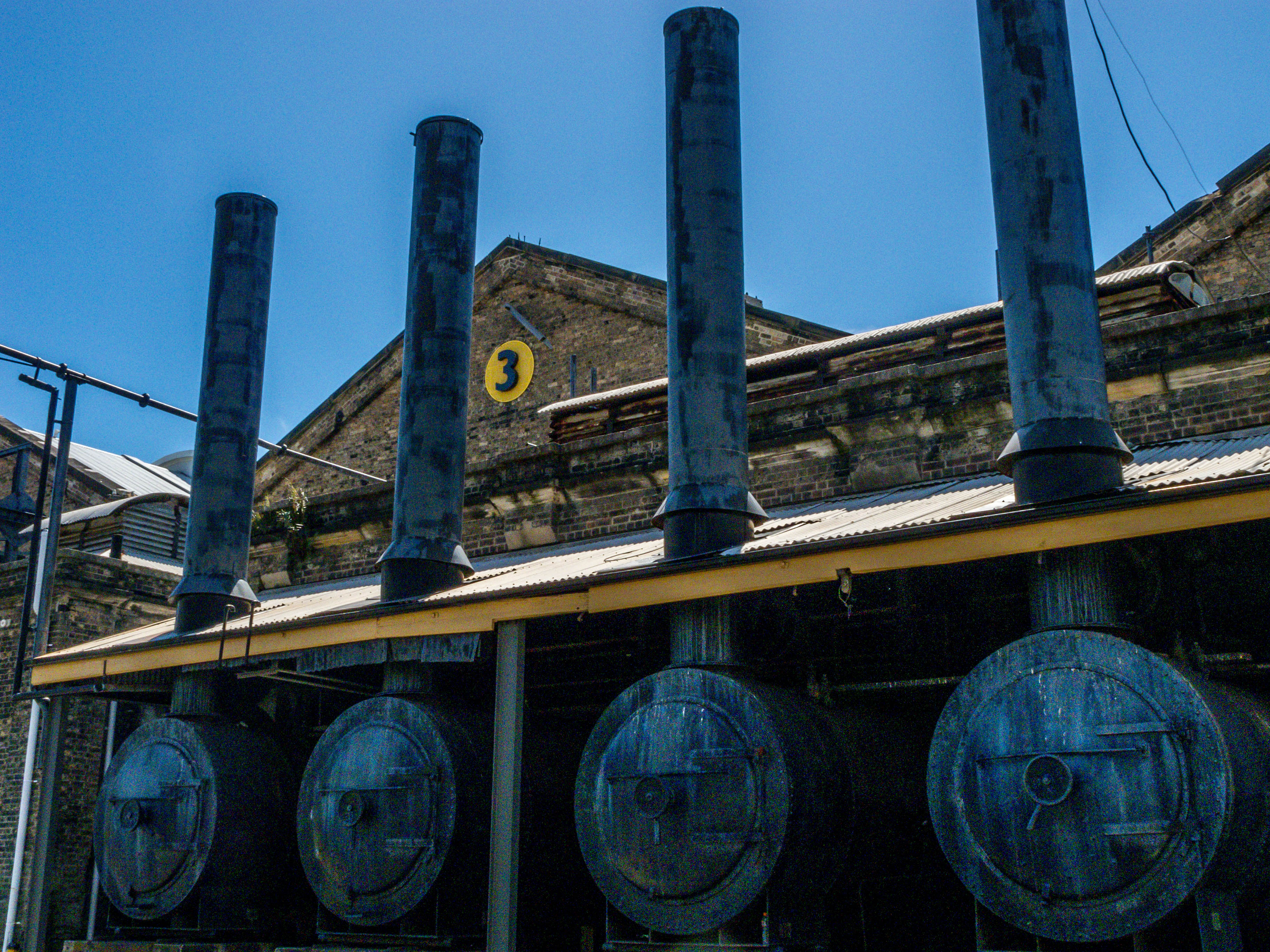
- Locomotive Workshops Boiler House
- Interactive map of the Eveleigh Railway Workshops area

New South Wales Heritage Register
- Official name: Eveleigh Railway Workshops; Eveleigh Railway Yards; Eveleigh Precinct; Australian Technology Park; Carriageworks; North Eveleigh; Macdonaldtown Gasworks; Macdonaldtown Triangle
- Type: State heritage (complex / group)
- Criteria: a., c., d., e., f.
- Designated: 2 April 1999
- Reference no.: 1140
- Type: Railway Workshop
- Category: Transport – Rail
- Builders: George Fishburn

Register of the National Estate
- Designated: 26 April 1988

The Eveleigh Railway Workshops a heritage-listed former railway workshop and yard for the New South Wales Government Railways, located in Redfern in Sydney's Inner West. It was designed by George Cowdery and built from 1882 to 1897 by George Fishburn. The workshops are considered to have world heritage significance by curators of the Smithsonian Institution. They were added to the New South Wales State Heritage Register on 2 April 1999.

Part of a larger complex that has been subject to some redevelopment, the workshops are also known as Eveleigh Railway Yards, South Eveleigh Precinct; North Eveleigh; Macdonaldtown Gasworks and the Macdonaldtown Triangle. The site is owned by the Transport Asset Holding Entity, and includes an events and cultural precinct known as Carriageworks.

== History ==
The workshops were conceived by Engineer-in-Charge John Whitton to build and maintain the infrastructure for the railway system, including the safe working systems and some of the perway systems. However, their main tasks were the maintenance and repair of locomotives and railway stock and the manufacture of rolling stock such as wagons and passenger carriages. At the time, there were no other facilities in NSW for the construction of locomotives and the workshops eventually became the largest railway workshops in the southern hemisphere and operated for over 100 years.

The workshops were set up on both the north and the south sides of the main western and southern railway lines, which led to a duplication of some workshop functions, but the really heavy work such as forging and casting of ferrous and non-ferrous metal, was to be carried out on the locomotive side. When the workshops were established most of the rolling stock had a wooden chassis, so the separation of services was not a major impediment to production.

The site for the Eveleigh railway yards was chosen in 1875, resumed in 1878 and the compensation price settled in 1880. Approximately A£100,000 was paid for 26 hectares (64.5 acres) of land. Clearance began two years later. Much work went into the design and construction of the buildings because of the sandy nature of the soil. In the meantime, Eveleigh Station had been opened in 1878. In 1906, it was renamed Redfern Station. The former Redfern railway station was renamed as Sydney Terminal (Central).

The Engine Running Shed, now demolished, was the first building completed. Cowdery was criticised for the extravagance of this building. It comprised three segmental arched bays, each covering seven "roads" without intervening columns.

George Fishburn was awarded the contract for bays 1–4 of the Locomotive Workshops in 1884 and work was commenced soon after. They were officially opened in 1887. Workshops 5–15 were opened later in the year. This initial building phase also included the construction of bays 16-25 of the Carriage Sheds, the Paint Shop, a General Store and various smaller buildings and the associated turntables, traversers and rail lines. Development continued into the 1890s. The workshops were open every day of the week until 1892 when union negotiations led to the workshops being closed on Saturdays.

The residential development of the area proceeded in the 1870s and 1880s around the railway workshop and was stimulated by the need for housing generated by the workshops. The names of many early settlers are continued in the street names in the area, including Eveleigh, and many of the property boundaries and former watercourses are reflected in street patterns. At the time of the development of the railway workshops, Darlington School was also built, as were other municipal buildings since demolished for the university.

For some time, Eveleigh had its own gas works which were located near Macdonaldtown railway station. However, in 1901, with the establishment of Ultimo Power Station which belonged to the Rail and Tramway Department, electric power was made available to the workshops. Shortly after, work commenced on the conversion of the rope-driven cranes to electric motor drives. Work also commenced on the replacement of the steam engines at the south end of the workshops by powerful electric motors. This, however, was not completed until 1914.

In 1907, the Commissioners for Railways decided to begin the manufacture of new locomotives at Eveleigh and the New Locomotive Shop was designed and constructed for this purpose.

A Public Works Annual Report in 1915 concluded that the Eveleigh Works were too congested and recommended the establishment of a new locomotive and repairing works. Adding to this situation, strained conditions led to eight strikes at Eveleigh between July 1915 and July 1917. In 1916, James Fraser, Acting Chief Commissioner, addressed workers at Eveleigh on the introduction of the Taylor card system. The introduction of this system on 2 August 1917 led to an 82-day general strike. It began when 1100 men struck at Randwick Tramway Depot and 3000 at Eveleigh. Volunteers kept trains running including boys from Newington and SHORE independent schools at Eveleigh.

This all took place during the World War I which brought worse conditions and declining wages.

The rail yards continued to develop. Additional land was resumed to the south-west and 230 houses were demolished to allow for the construction of the Alexandria Goods Yard sometime around 1917. During 1925 the manufacture of new locomotives ceased.

As a result of World War II (1939–45), bays 5-6 were cleared of machinery in 1940 and plans drawn up for the installation of equipment supplied by the Department of Defence for the manufacture of 25lb field gun-shells. A mezzanine floor was added to Bay 5 in 1941 and the machinery for shell manufacture installed by February. Bay 8 was altered for an ammunitions annex. By 1943, Bay 8 had been abandoned by the Department of Defence as it had organised its own factories. Production of the shells ceased in 1945 and the construction of new locomotives was reintroduced. This post-war locomotive manufacturing lasted until 1952 when Eveleigh once again became a repair and maintenance facility. The decision to abandon steam locomotives in 1963 meant that Eveleigh, which was dedicated to steam locomotive maintenance and repair, entered its final phase.

The yards continued to grow and expand, and functions were continually changing. In later years, workshops at Chullora in 1937 and later Clyde took over aspects of work formerly performed at Eveleigh and functions were rearranged accordingly.

Re-organisation and attempts at modernisation in the 1970s came too late. Too much of the machinery was suited only to the steam locomotive era. Buildings containing old equipment, machinery which had become progressively inappropriate to a modern transport era, and a changing work culture, has seen the yards decline gradually in the late 20th century until its closure in 1988. After closure, bays 5–15 were used by Paddy's Markets while other buildings on the site were demolished over an extended period. These included the Pattern Shed, Foundry, Smith's Shops and the Wheelpress Shop. In 1991, the NSW Government announced the creation of a technology park at Eveleigh in association with the University of NSW, the University of Sydney and the University of Technology. Decontamination works were carried out to cleared areas of the site progressively.

In 1994, Paddy's Markets returned to Haymarket. City West Development Corporation took ownership of the Locomotive Workshops, bays 1–15, in addition to the New Locomotive Shed and the Manager's Office.

=== Latest use ===
Today, the functions formerly carried out at Eveleigh are no longer carried out by government enterprises or no longer carried out in Australia.

The locomotive workshop was closed in 1988 and the main rail workshops were moved to Enfield. From 1988, part of the workshop was used as the Tangara commissioning centre before being rebuilt as the Xplorer-Endeavour Service Centre in 1994. In 2002 the former ACDEP site was redeveloped as Eveleigh Maintenance Centre, where Downer EDi Rail serviced Sydney Trains' Millennium trains and Sydney Trains maintenance division serviced the Oscar sets. In 2018, maintenance of Millennium sets moved to the Auburn Maintenance Centre and the NSW TrainLink Oscar sets to UGL Rail Maintrain. Eveleigh is now only used to stable Oscar sets for Interurban services to Springwood, Newcastle, Port Kembla & Kiama and sector 2 trains throughout the day.

In 2009, the Locomotive Workshops were redeveloped as Australian Technology Park and Seven Network Sydney headquarters.

In 2017, the volunteer group 3801 Limited (or East Coast Heritage Rail), which takes its name from the 3801 locomotive steam train, who have for a 30-year period used the Limited Large Erecting Shed at Eveleigh to restore and maintain heritage diesel carriages and locomotives that take tourists and enthusiasts on rail adventures, was locked out of its workshop. Transport for NSW took over the shed after a review determined the 3801 group must clear out to share the space with other heritage operators. A Transport for NSW spokesman said the department had offered assistance to find an alternative site for 3801 Limited.

In November 2018, plans were announced to move Transport Heritage NSW to a new location in Chullora known as the Chullora Heritage Hub.

== Description ==
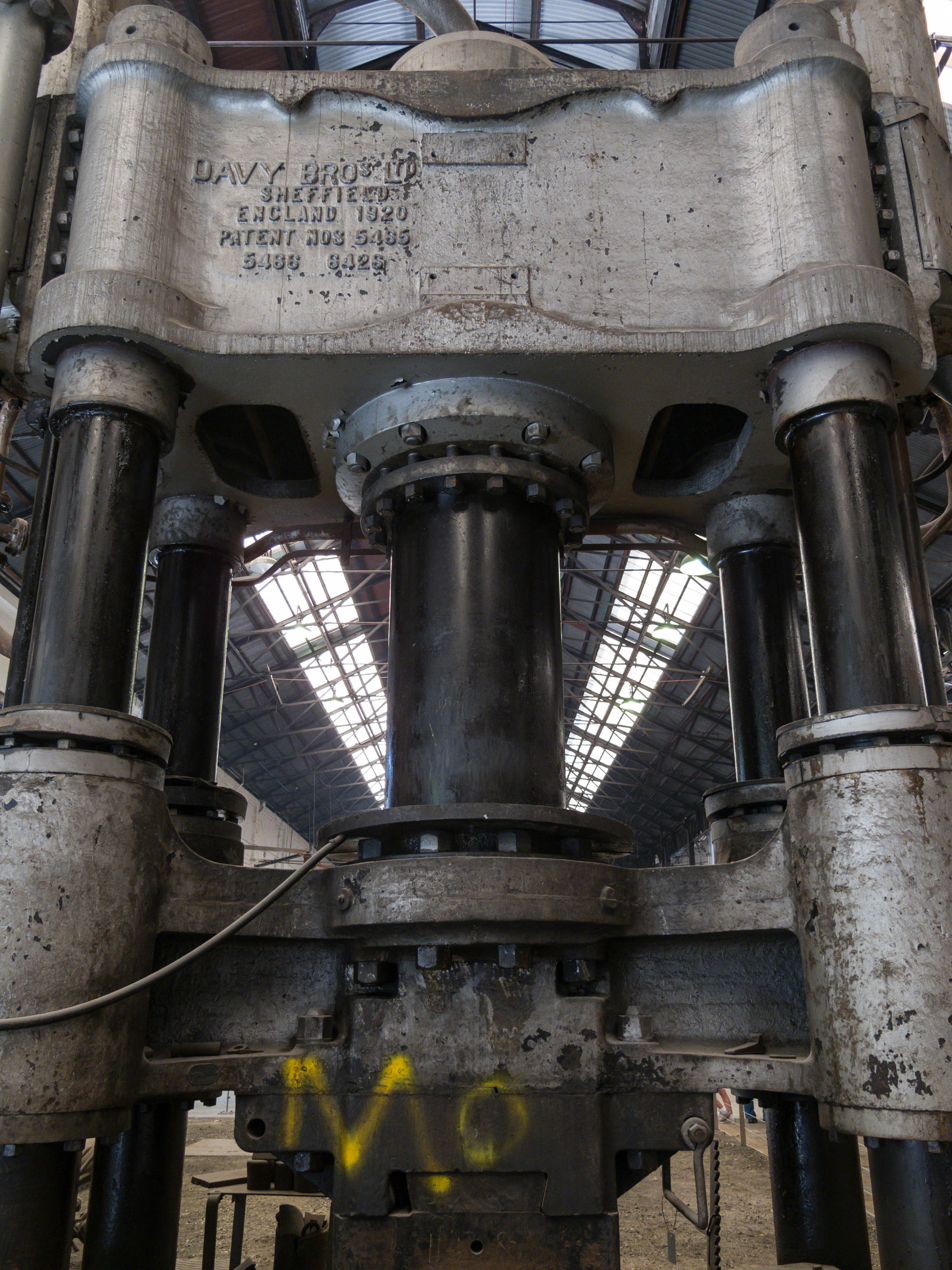
1500T Davy Press in Blacksmith Shop

The Eveleigh Precinct is located approximately four kilometres (two miles) south of the Sydney GPO and is bounded by the inner city suburbs of Darlington, Redfern, Alexandria Park, Erskinville and Newtown. The total area of the precinct, which runs from Redfern Station in the northeast to Erskinville and MacDonaldtown Stations in the southwest, is approximately 51 hectares (126 acres). It is located across the main railway corridor to Central Station.

Most of the southern portion of the overall site has been declared surplus to railway needs and much of this area has been cleared and was used as a parking area for Paddy's Markets while they were occupying the Locomotive Workshop. Other portions of the southern precinct have been redeveloped for public housing. Several former railway buildings stand vacant. There are numerous collections of machinery within the buildings on the site, including equipment adjacent to the Locomotive Workshops and machinery inside the buildings.

=== Locomotive Workshops ===
The brick workshop building located in South Eveleigh operated from 1884 to 1986 and overhauled, repaired, modified and built new locomotives for New South Wales Government Railways. Classes of successful locomotives from the small C30 Class through the C38 Class and D58 Classes and assembly of the largest AD60 Class locomotives.

Eveleigh Railway Workshops consisted of 15 Bays featuring:

- Bays 1 and 2 – Blacksmith's Shop, 1500T Davy Press, 40cwt double-arch steam drop hammer, a 20cwt heavy steam hammer plus numerous small hammers.
- Bays 3, 4 and 4A – Boilermaker's's Shop, with Bay 3 featuring the Heat Treatment Room
- Bay 5 – Canteen and Fitting Shop, 1st year apprentice Fitters (Boystown)
- Bay 6 – Millwright's Shop
- Bays 7 and 8 – Fitting Shop
- Bay 9 – Axles and Wheels
- Bays 10, 11 and 12 – Machine Shop
- Bays 13 and 14 – Tool and Instrument Room

The external walls are of sandstock brickwork laid in English bond with arched window and door openings picked out in white bricks. The pediments have circular vents filled with louvres. The brickwork is modulated into bays forming piers which strengthen the walls.

Externally, brick walls feature sandstone cornices, parapets, sills and base courses. The stone generally extends the full depth of the wall. The top face of the parapets (and cornices) are splayed to fall to the outside to discharge water and they are joined on the top face by cast iron toggles, about one inch thick. On the pedimented areas roof flashings are recessed in a trench in the stone. The walls and internal columns are supported on massed brick footings. In bays 1–4 there are brick arches between piers and each pier is supported on a timber platform and timber piles, twelve in each corner and six at each column.

Inside the building is a grid of round, hollow cast iron columns moulded in a classical style supported on footings. The columns support the crane girders and the roof. The corrugated iron clad roof is supported by fine wrought iron trusses with diagonal wind bracing which fixes through the walls at each end. The purlins are wrought iron 'Z's. Timber purlins have been added in some places for ease of fixing replacement roofing. Monitor roofs run the length of the bays with a curved roof supported on curved wrought iron rafters.

Along the south side of the building are a series of annexes of varying dates of construction.

Along the south of the building are two sets of tracks and several associated turntables. To the east in the space between the Loco Shop and the new Loco Shed a track lays parallel to the building, sections of which are now exposed.

=== Carriage Workshops ===
Built between 1884–1887 were originally designed for maintenance and repair of wagons and carriages. Later new carriages were designed and manufactured. Bays in the Carriage Workshops were numbered 16–25 over 17,500 square metres (188,000 sq ft). The construction of these workshops are essentially the same as the Locomotive Workshops.

=== Paint shop ===
A large single storey building containing eight roads in the brick section and five roads in the adjacent metal clad section to the north. Within the brick building each road is separated by a single row of cast iron columns which support the saw tooth south light roof, whilst in the steel annex there are two roads per bay.

=== Turntable and trackwork ===
This is located west of the Large Erecting Shop.

=== Air raid shelters ===
These are scattered along the existing rail corridor, generally located along embankments or cuttings.

=== ACDEP ===
On 3 May 1968, the Air-Conditioned Depot (ACDEP) opened as the home depot for all long distance HUB, RUB and stainless steel sleeping carriages taking over the function from Flemington Maintenance Depot. It also serviced carriages off the Spirit of Progress and Indian Pacific. From March 1971, it took over the maintenance on the DEB railcar sets.

=== Condition ===
As at 7 May 2014, the archaeological potential of the site is medium to high and the site's physical condition assessed as fair. The Eveleigh Locomotive Workshops are the largest surviving, intact railway workshops dating from the steam era in Australia, and possibly the world.

=== Modifications and dates ===
Since its establishment in 1875, the following modifications have occurred:

- 1875 – 26.1-hectare (64.5-acre) site at Eveleigh selected
- 1878 – site resumed, Eveleigh station had been opened
- 1880 – £100,000 compensation price settled
- 1880s – Engine Running Shed, locomotive workshop, carriage shed, CME Office completed
- 1899 – Large Erecting Shop added to the site
- 1901 – Ultimo Power Station electric power to the workshops
- 1901 – By this year the new foundry and laundry had been constructed
- 1902 – Cranes converted to electric drives, new copper and tinsmiths shop erected
- 1906 – Eveleigh station renamed Redfern
- 1907 – The New Locomotive Shop designed and constructed, new compressor house constructed
- 1914 – Electrification of machinery completed, new Locomotive Shop extended to the south
- 1917 – General Strike began with the 3,000 workers and spread across Australia. Resumption of adjacent houses to the south for the Alexandria Goods Yard.
- 1920s – Several new buildings completed, leading to a rearrangement of the workshops
- 1925 – North bay of Running Shed demolished
- 1965 – Southern and middle bay of Running Shed demolished to make way for ACDEP carriage depot
- 1970s – Workshops rearranged internally to update the works and the Spring Shop was removed
- c. 1980s – concrete Taj Mahal structure on south side of Eveleigh Rail Yards travelling west – removed at unknown date
- 1986 – Large Erecting Shop leased to 3801 Limited to house 3801 and rollingstock
- 2006 – 3801 leaves the Large Erecting Shop for the last time, returning her to the NSW Rail Transport Museum
- 2008 – Eveleigh Carriage Workshops building adapted for use as a performance space and art gallery and renamed Carriageworks
- 2009 – Redeveloped as Australian Technology Park and Seven Network Sydney headquarters
- 2015 – Australian Technology Park purchased by Mirvac for $263 million to accommodate a new Commonwealth Bank office campus
- 2017 – 3801 Limited's use of the Large Erecting Shop is terminated.

== Architectural awards ==
=== Adaptive reuse award, 2008 ===
In 2008, the Australian Institute of Architects awarded Tonkin Zulaikha Greer with the AIA Architecture Award for the adaptive reuse of Carriageworks at Eveleigh. The award citation read:

"... an exciting addition to the cultural life of Sydney and its artists. It provides an environment of unique creativity and innovation; a new home for physical theatre, spoken word, music, dance, visual and hybrid arts. The site is close to the city but difficult to access and being below road level not easy to identify. This has been resolved by the simple gesture of creating a small plaza at street level and celebrating it with a new public marker made of recycled trusses from the building. The project is essentially an exercise in adaptive reuse: the design reveals and celebrates the industrial heritage of the site. The strength of the design comes from the directness of its response to the old buildings, respecting their structural grid as an ordering device and inserting simple strong new forms as a counterpoint to the intricacies of the old. The foyer delivers a remarkable new public space, animated and activated by the revealed heritage items. Located in the Redfern-Waterloo precinct, CarriageWorks sets a precedent for the remaining development of the site, for heritage values to be respected and to inform the design of new interventions."

=== Heritage award ===
The Australian Institute of Architects also awarded Tonkin Zulaikha Greer with the AIA Greenway Award for the heritage of Carriageworks at Eveleigh. The award citation read:

"The Eveleigh Carriage Workshops are of national cultural significance as part of the largest intact, high quality workshop site from the steam era in Australia. It has now been opened to the public in a creative new way. This landmark site has been given new life without forsaking the old – its 1888 industrial heritage clearly evident through the retention of nearly all the significant fabric and equipment extant at the time of adaptation. The carriages have gone, but not the cranes, the rails and the ability to read its form and former function. Existing elements retain their patina of age. This project, realised on a strict budget and even stricter timetable, provides flexible theatre spaces, administration offices, workshop spaces and amenities in discrete concrete boxes clearly articulated from the heritage fabric.

The success of the project stems from its simplicity and the quality of design and detailing in the new work. The spaces created by the new theatre boxes has enriched the interior rather than detracted from it. The complexity of the frame, the structure and the industrial artefacts are powerful. This is a confident design approach that does not diminish that significance.

While sections of the building have been altered, these are minor in terms of the scale of the overall conservation exercise and accessibility this project brings. The desire to successfully adapt buildings is often not matched by the design. Here at Eveleigh the evidence is concrete.

== Personnel ==
The workshops, at one stage, the largest enterprise in Australia employed local, Indigenous and European migrants throughout its history.

Notable people who worked at Eveleigh included:

- Joseph Cahill – State Premier 1952–1959
- Agnes Mary Lions – Industrial nurse and union organiser 1947–1968
- James McGowen – Boilermaker and later State Premier 1910–1913
- William McKell – Boilermaker, State Premier 1941–1944, Governor-General 1947–1953
- David Redmond – Apprentice Fitter then Fitter and later Mayor Sutherland Shire Council 2006–2008

== Heritage listing ==
The Eveleigh Railway Yards are historic railway engineering workshops and Eveleigh contains one of the most complete late 19th century and early 20th century forge installations, collection of cranes and power systems, in particular the hydraulic system. The place is of international significance and is one of Australia's finest industrial heritage items. The value of the place is increased by the fact that it consists of assemblages, collections and operational systems rather than individual items. Conversely, the significance has been reduced by its closure, relocation of some machinery and its disassociation from the operating rail network.

Eveleigh Railway Workshops was listed on the New South Wales State Heritage Register on 2 April 1999 having satisfied the following criteria.

The place is important in demonstrating the course, or pattern, of cultural or natural history in New South Wales.

The workshops were an important part of the NSW rail network which was instrumental in the development of the state during the 19th and 20th century. The construction of the workshops influenced the development of the local area (which was developed for worker's housing) both by providing employment and by its bulk and presence, starting bells and sirens. The yards were associated with developments in working conditions now crucial to the Australian cultural identity, eg) the weekend. The yards had an important association with the labour movement. The place was seen initially as a positive instrument of state socialism and in later periods as the site of important labour actions and of restrictive work practices. They were conceived by Whitton, the "father" of the NSW railways, and were an integral part of his NSW rail system, and were executed in detail by Cowdery.

The place is important in demonstrating aesthetic characteristics and/or a high degree of creative or technical achievement in New South Wales.

The entire complex has a strong industrial character generated by the rail network itself, by the large horizontal scale of the buildings, the consistent use of brick and corrugated iron, the repetitive shapes of roof elements and of details such as doors and windows and because of the uniform grey colours. The simple, strong functional forms of the buildings have landmark quality, not only as important townscape elements in the Redfern/Eveleigh area, but as part of the visual train journey of thousands of commuters, marking arrival in the city centre. The major buildings from the original 19th century development of the site are well designed, detailed and built exhibiting a high degree of unity of design, detailing and materials.

The place has a strong or special association with a particular community or cultural group in New South Wales for social, cultural or spiritual reasons.

The Workshops were one of the largest employers in Sydney at the turn of the century, declining only in the latter half of the 20th century. It was and is an important source of pride and in demonstrating the capacity of Australian industry and workers and a high level of craft skills. The place is significant to railway workers, former railway workers and railway unions and is associated with the stories of many, including workers and locals, which are important to cultural identity. Although no longer operating as a workshop, the place maintains symbolic value for the community as a former workplace and a place that provided economic input into the local area. It has strong symbolic ties with existing trade unions.

The place has potential to yield information that will contribute to an understanding of the cultural or natural history of New South Wales.

The Eveleigh railway workshops have considerable research potential for understanding the operation of railway workshops. This potential is enhanced by the extent of archival material available and because the relatively recent closure means that there are many former workshop workers who are still alive and who know how the place operated. They have unique educational value enhanced by the highly valuable location and the relationship with the ATP and the three universities. They contain the potential to achieve an understanding of the work practices of today through an understanding of the cultural continuity between 19th century technology and 21st century technology. There is potential for further research to yield information about the labour movement, labour relations and the nature of work practices in the 19th and 20th centuries. Archaeological remains have the potential to reveal further information about the operation of the Yards.

The place possesses uncommon, rare or endangered aspects of the cultural or natural history of New South Wales.

The size and quality of the site is rare.

== Gallery ==
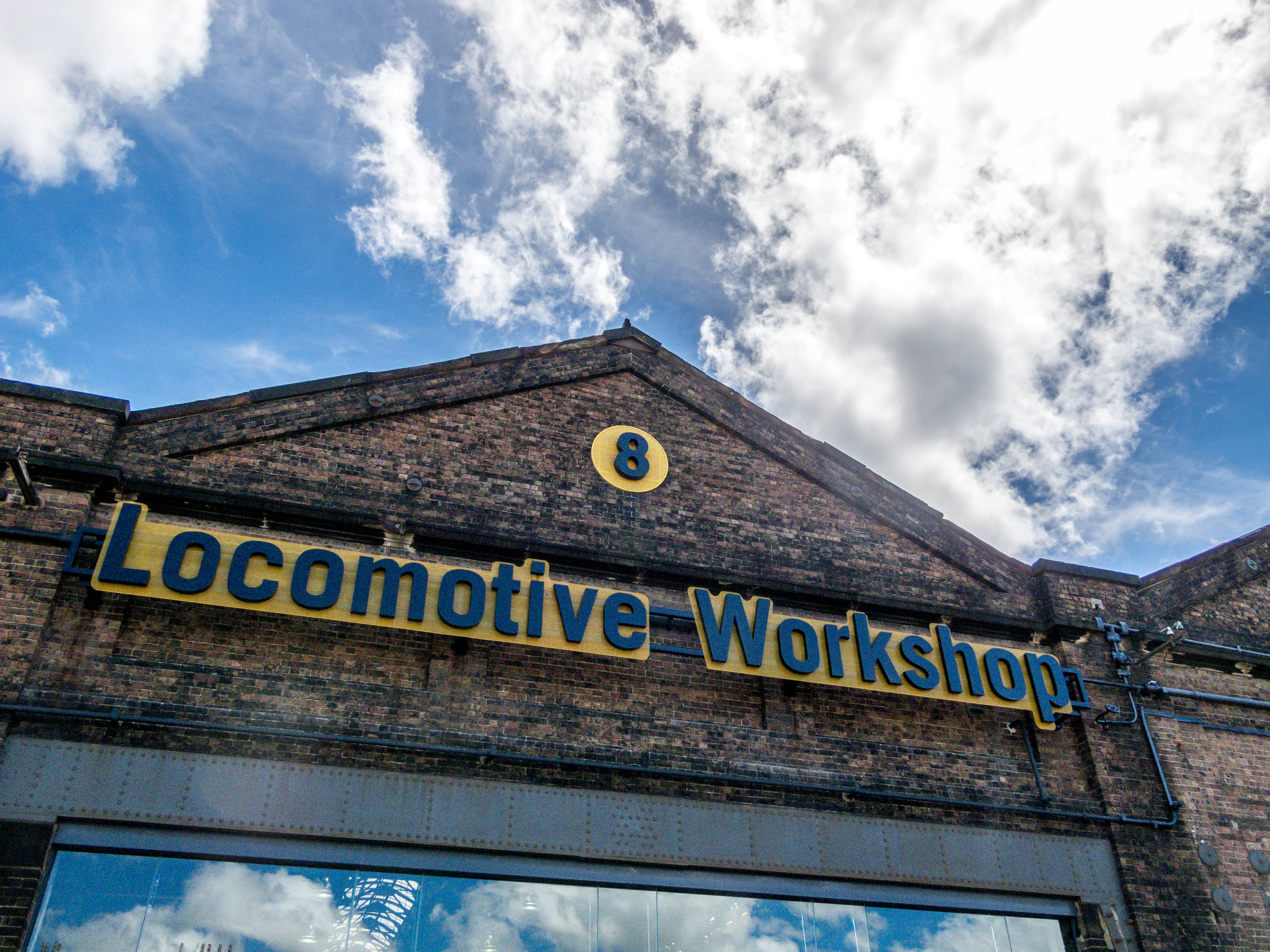
Locomotive Workshops

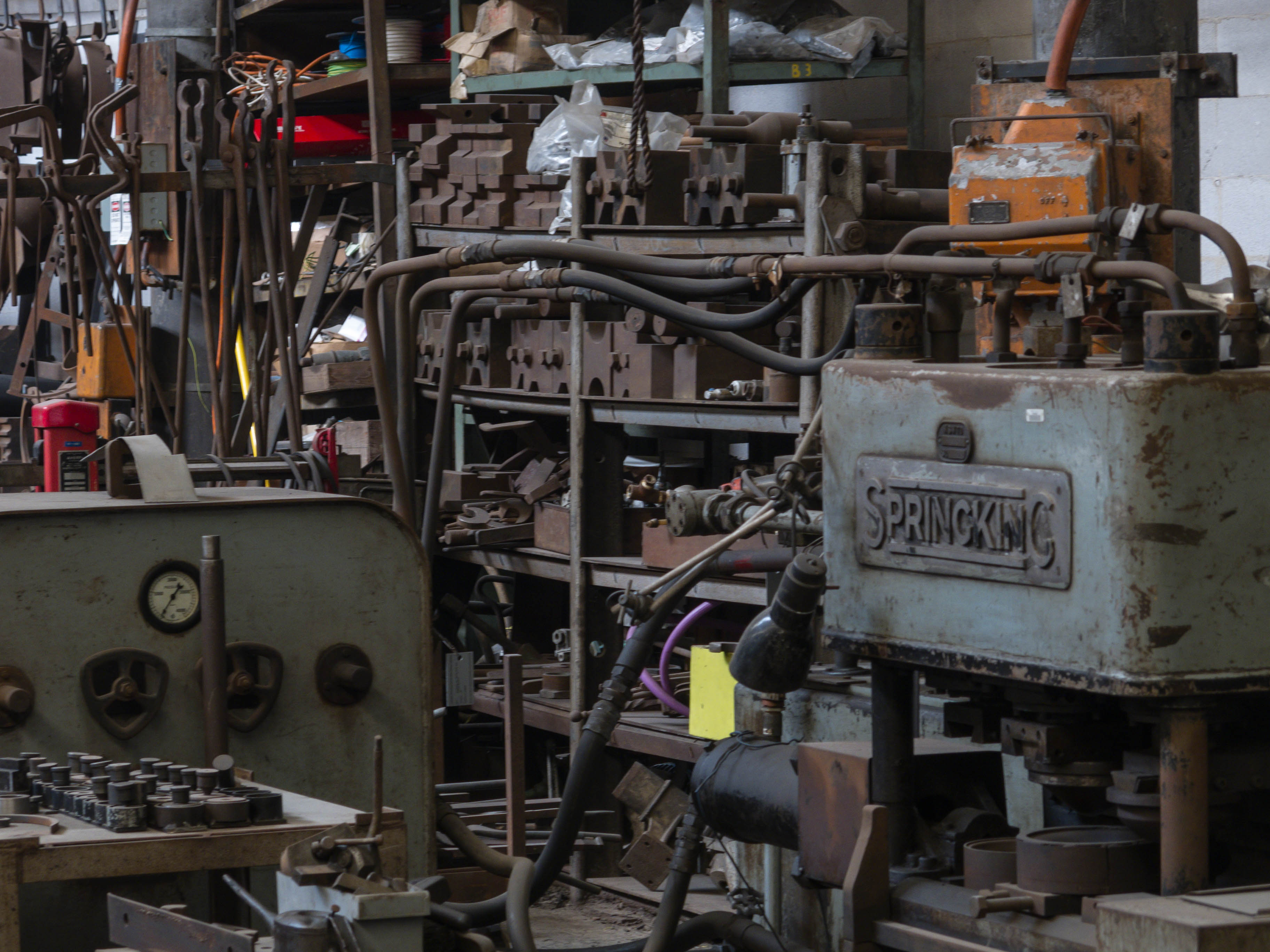
Blacksmiths Shop

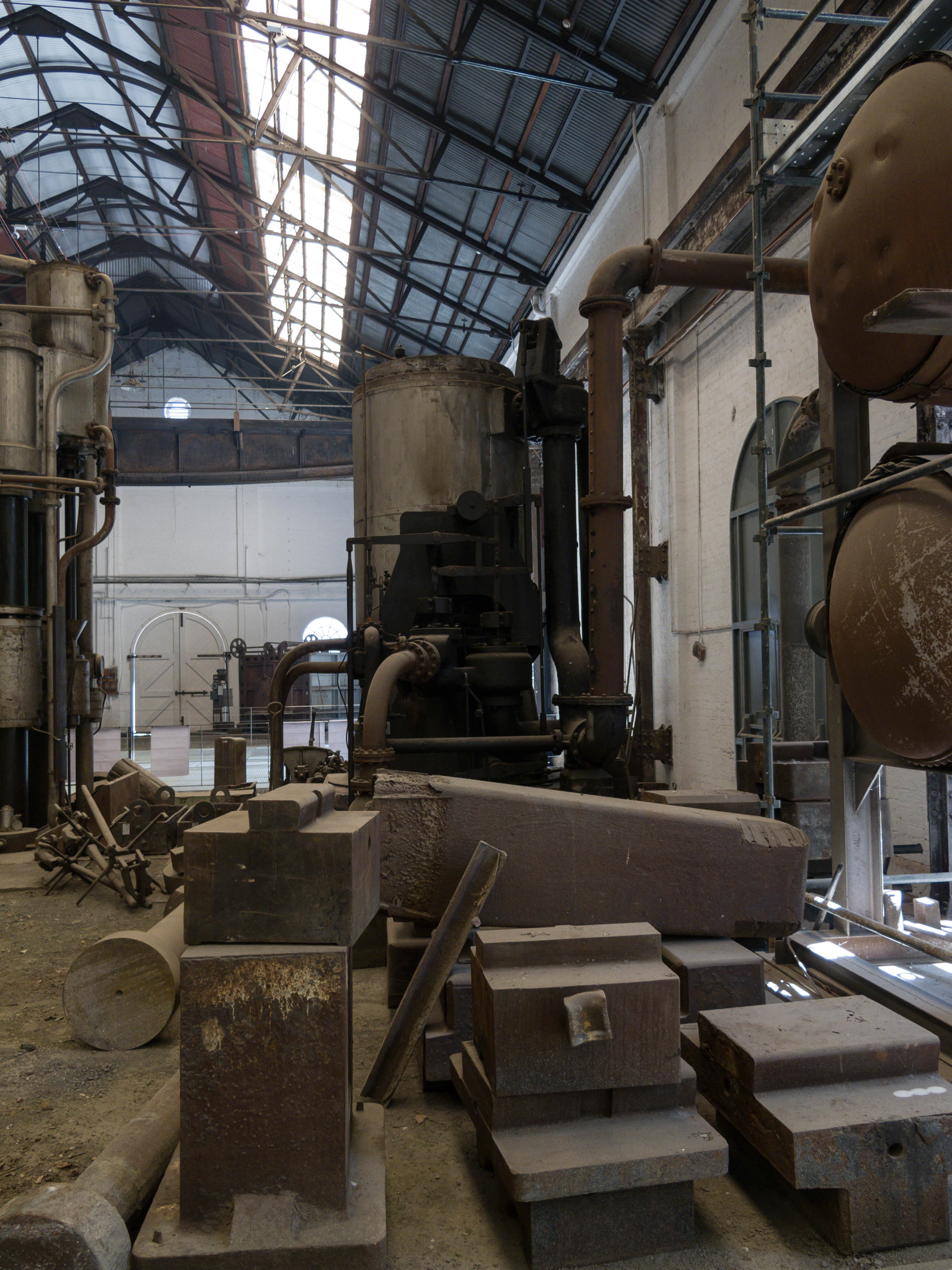
Blacksmiths Shop

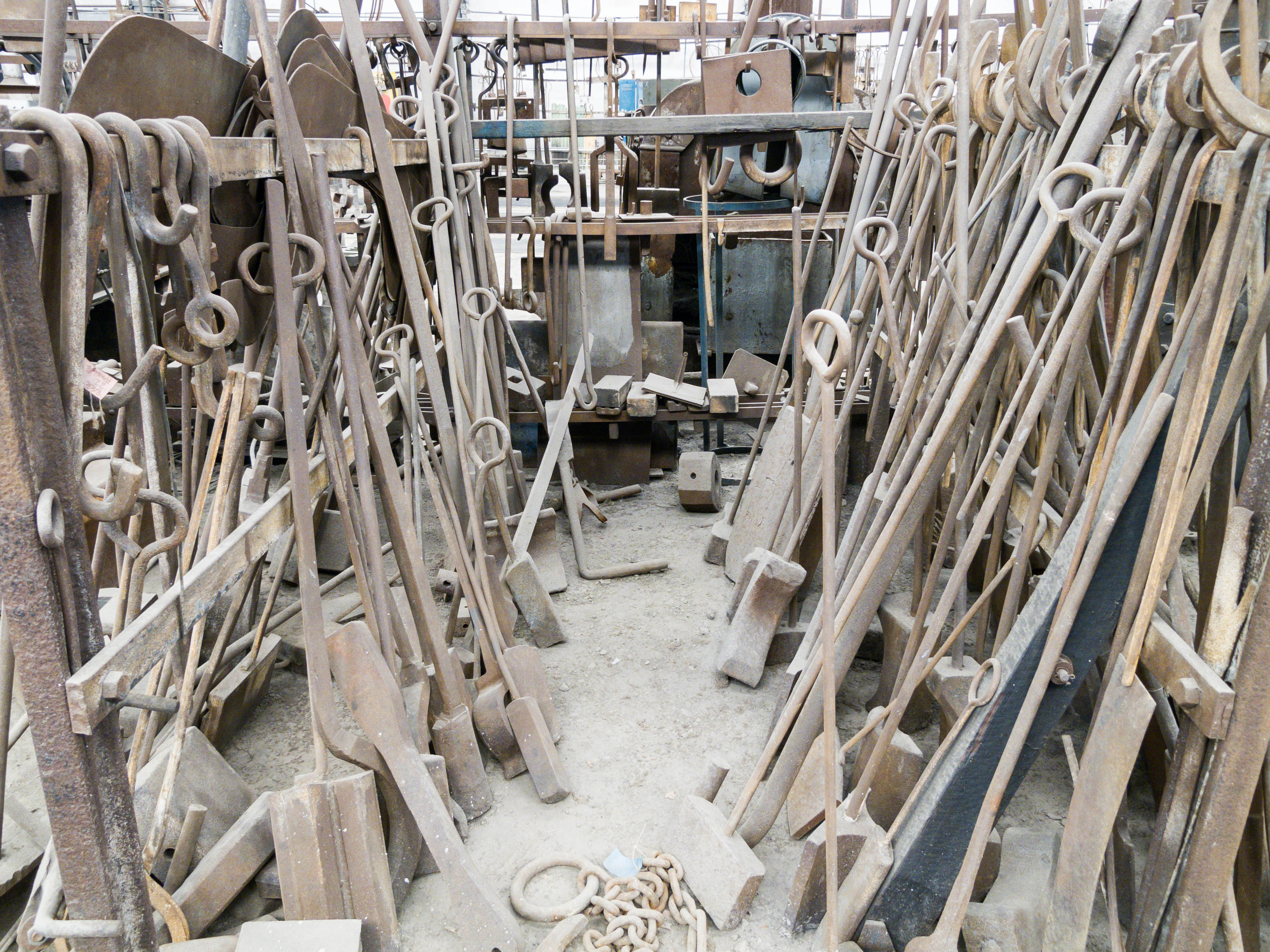
Blacksmiths Tools

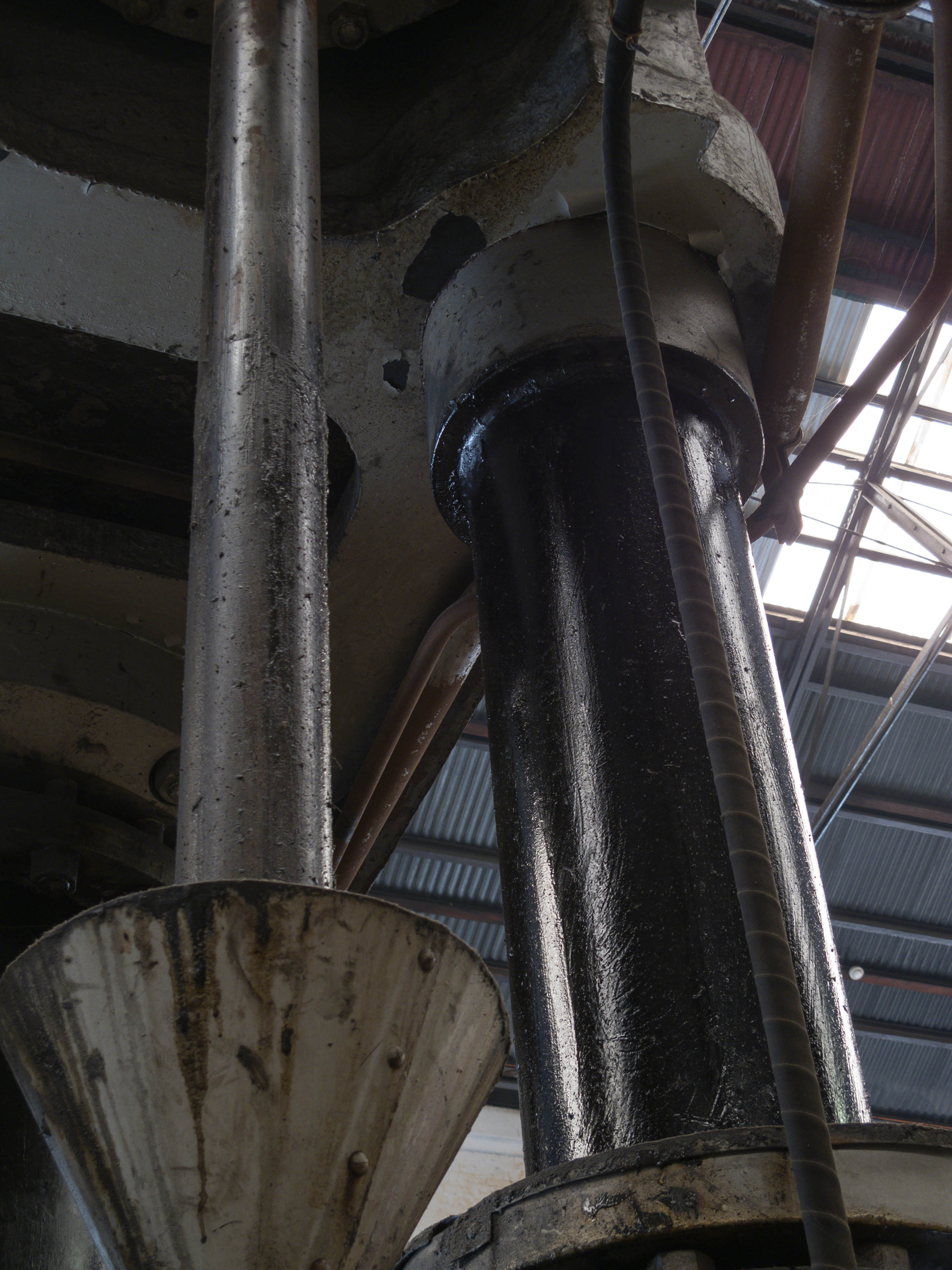
Blacksmiths Shop

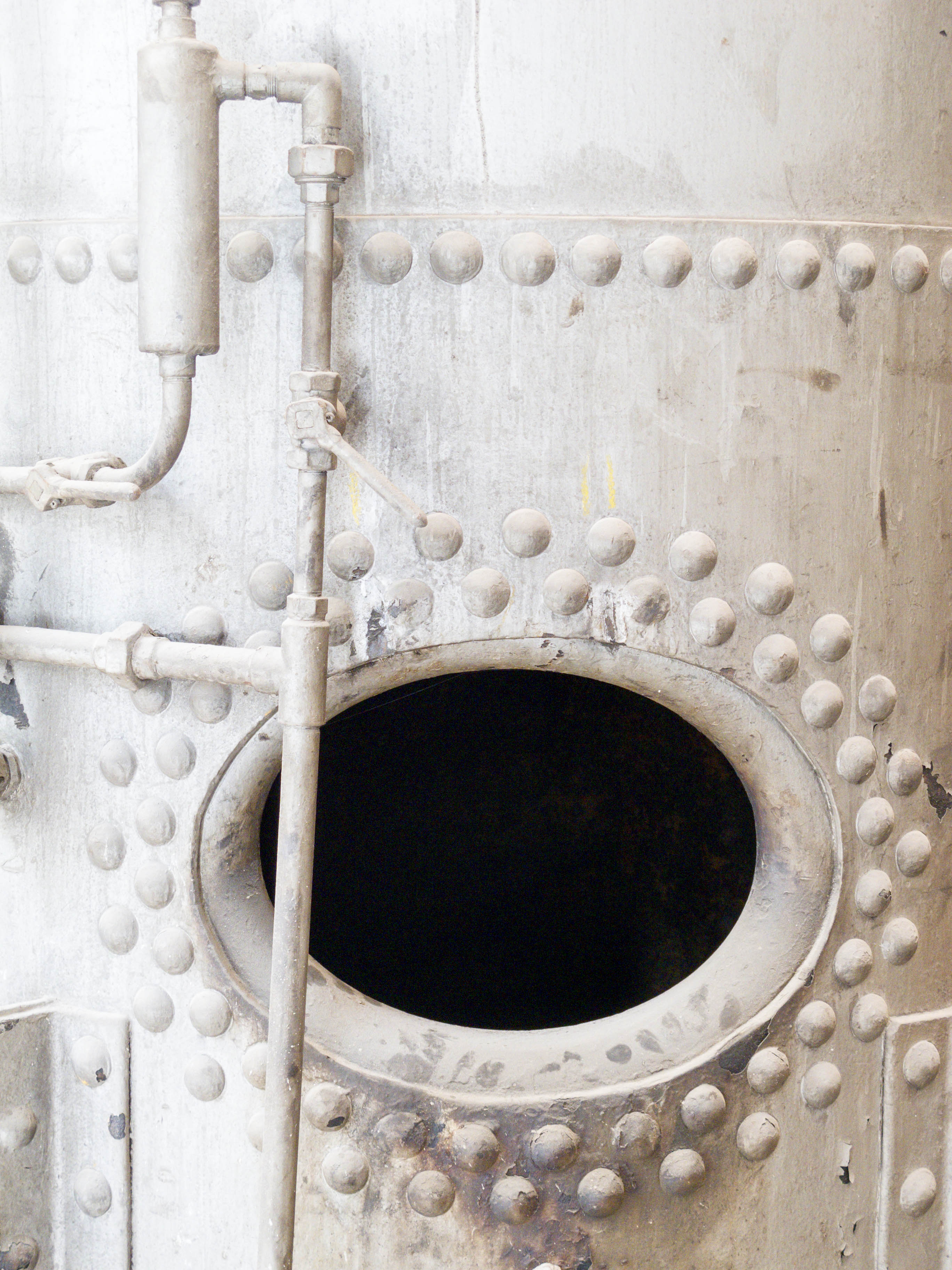
Steam Intensifier

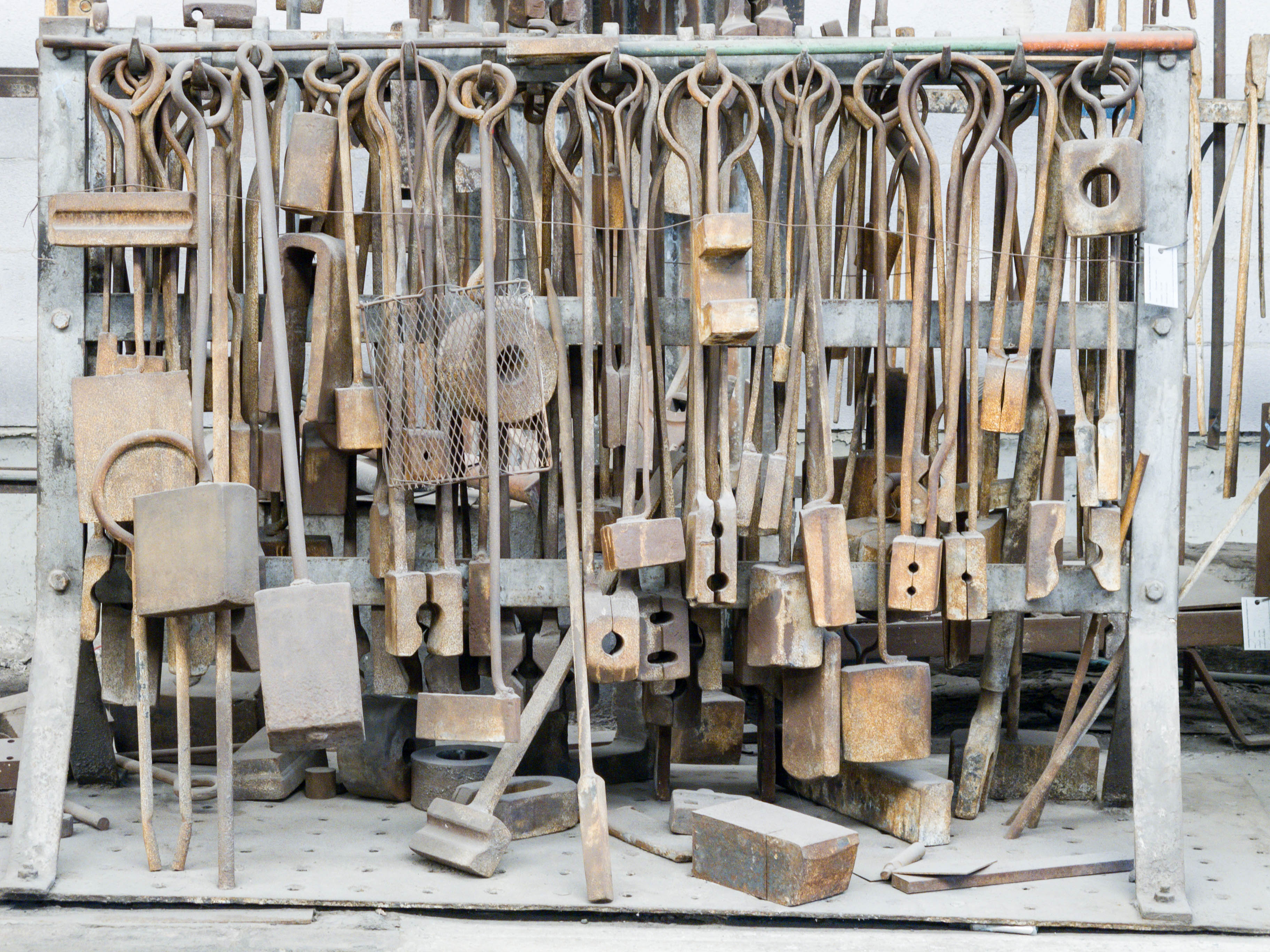
Blacksmiths Tools

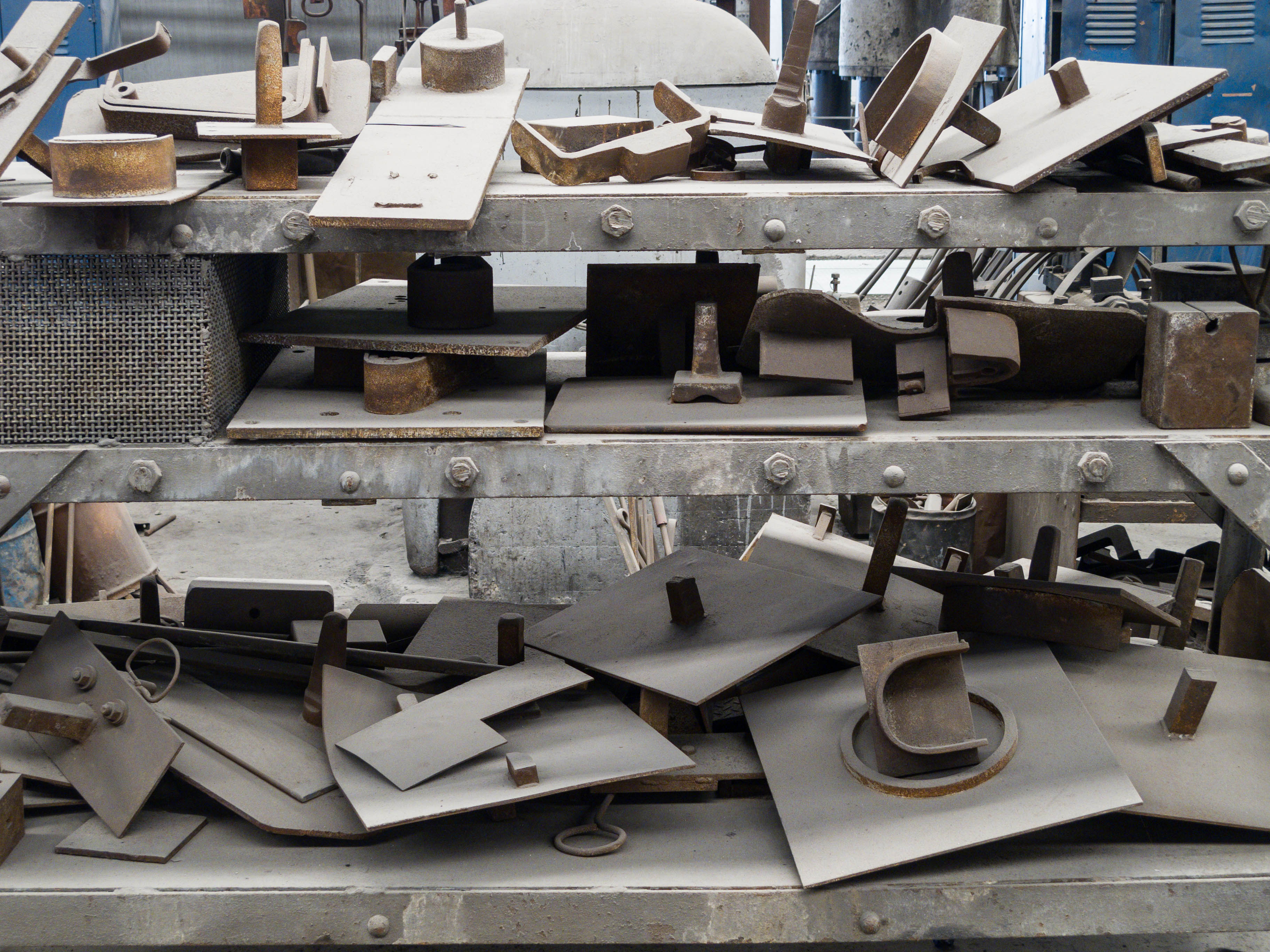
Blacksmiths Shop

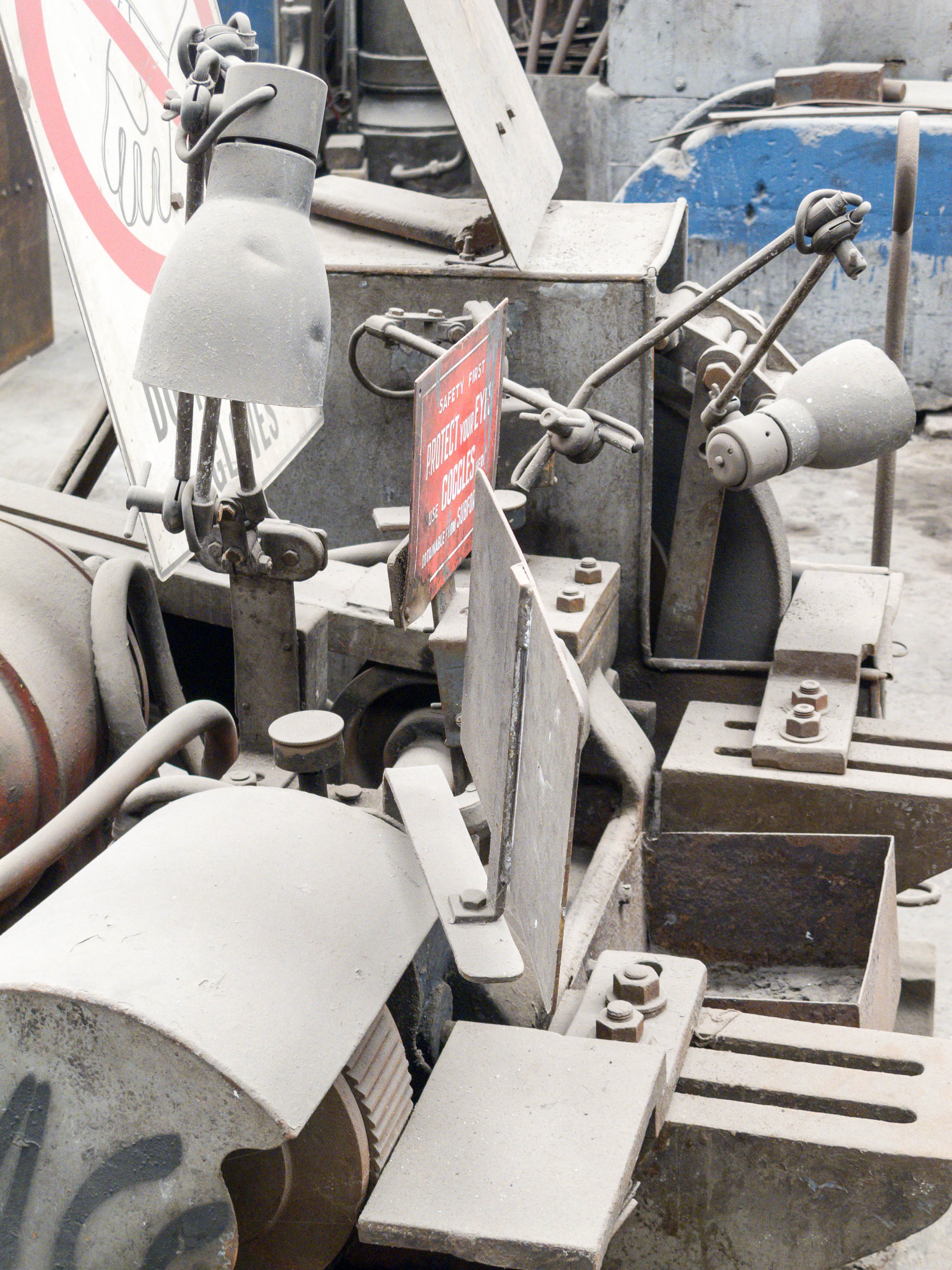
Blacksmiths Shop

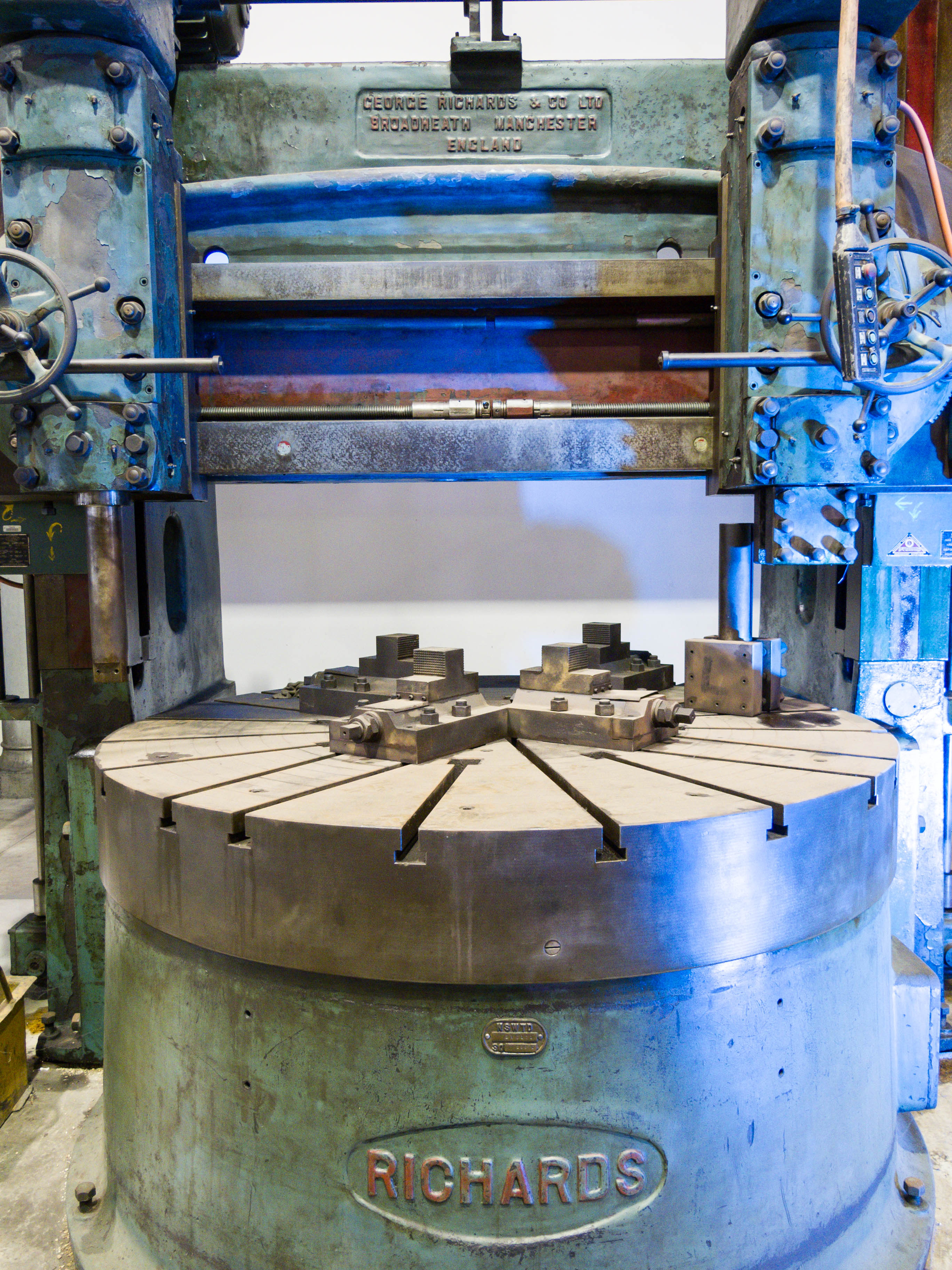
Machine Shop

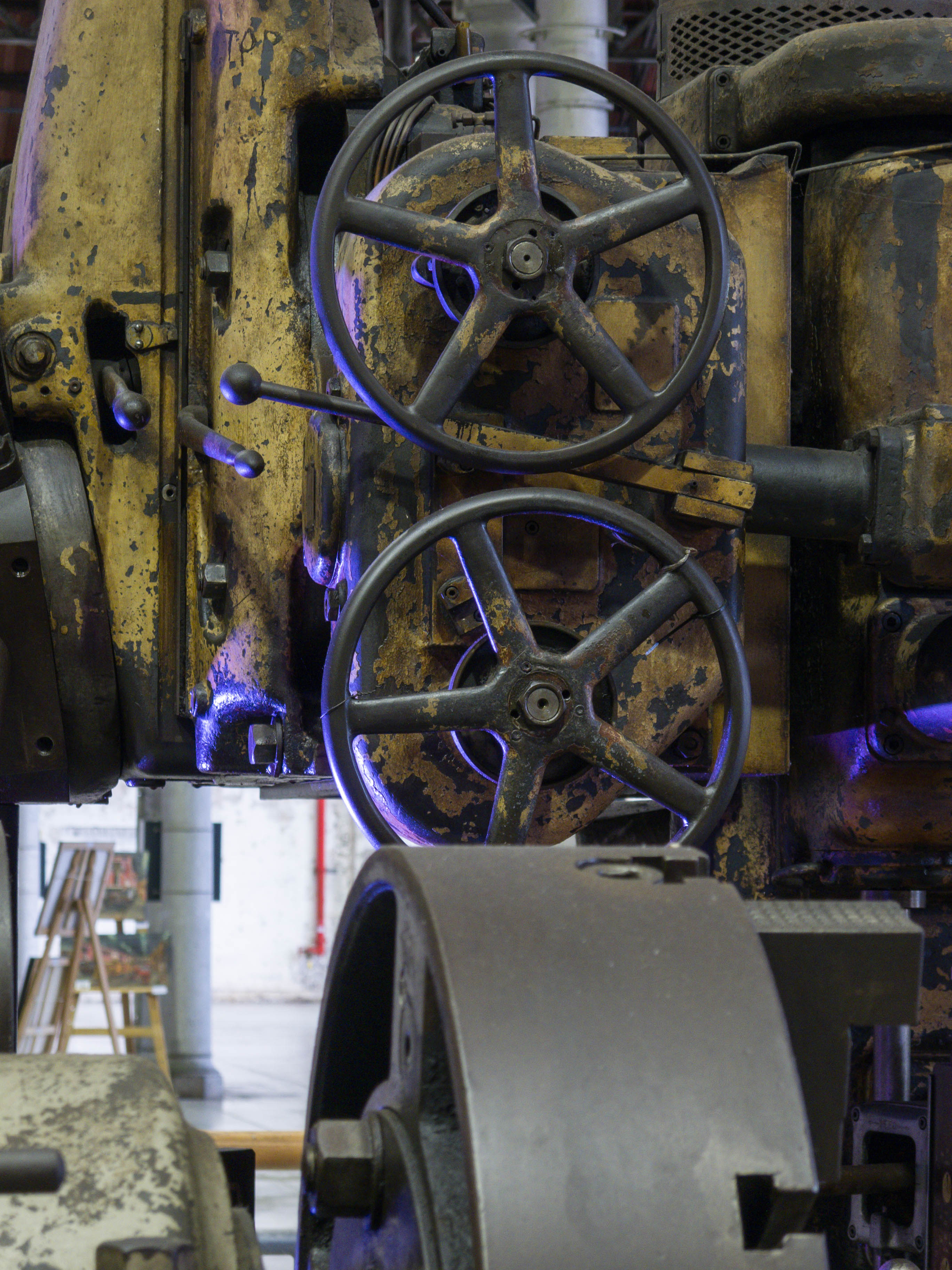
Machines Shop

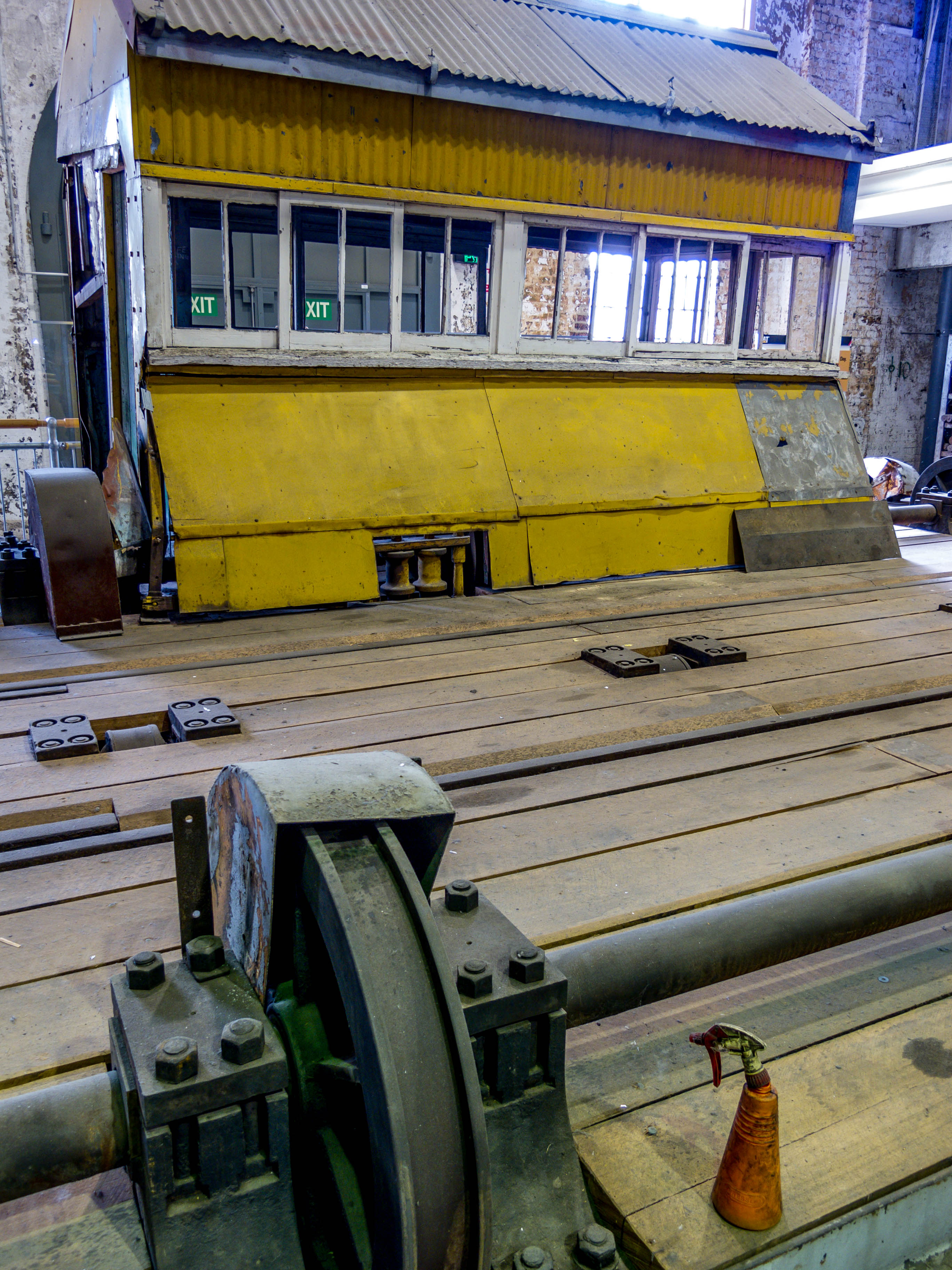
Traverser

== See also ==
- Australian Technology Park
- Eveleigh Railway Workshops machinery
- Eveleigh Carriage Workshops
- Eveleigh Chief Mechanical Engineer's office
- Rail transport in New South Wales
