= Eveleigh Carriage Workshops =

Railway facility in Sydney, New South Wales, Australia

- Location in Greater Sydney
- Built: 1888
- Operated: 1889–1989
- Location: Sydney, New South Wales, Australia
- Coordinates: 33°53′39″S 151°11′30″E
- Industry: Railway
- Area: located within the 51-hectare (130-acre) Eveleigh Complex
- Defunct: Closed in 1989 and repurposed as Carriageworks and other uses

The Eveleigh Carriage Workshops were built by the New South Wales Government Railways in 1888 as a depot for its passenger carriage fleet. The workshops are located west of what is now Redfern station on the northern side of the Main Suburban railway line opposite the heritage-listed Eveleigh Railway Workshops.

The repair and heavy maintenance of both Sydney suburban and long-distance carriages were undertaken on site between 1888 until its closure in 1989. In 1986 the workshop was upgraded to refurbish single-deck suburban carriages. Following this program ceasing the works closed in September 1989 after which it was used to store redundant carriages and to remove asbestos from locomotives and carriages.

The western end of the site has been redeveloped as the Carriageworks theatre while the eastern end houses some of Transport for NSW's heritage fleet.

== See also ==
- Rail transport in New South Wales
