= Class 58 =

Class 58 or 58 class may refer to:

- British Rail Class 58
- CFR Class 58: A Romanian railway stock owned by CFR bought from French railway company, SNCF of now-retired stocks SNCF Class Z 6100 and SNCF Class Z 6300
- DRG Class 58, a group of German 2-10-0 (Decapod) freight locomotives operated by the Deutsche Reichsbahn comprising the following sub-classes:
  - Class 58.0: Prussian G 12.1
  - Class 58.1: Saxon XIII H (1917 variant)
  - Class 58.2–3: Baden G 12
  - Class 58.4: Saxon XIII H (1919 variant)
  - Class 58.5: Württemberg G 12
  - Class 58.6: LBE G 12
  - Class 58.6^{II}: PH O'
  - Class 58.7: BBÖ 81
  - Class 58.8: BBÖ 181
  - Class 58.9: BBÖ 580, BBÖ 380
  - Class 58.10–21: Prussian G 12
  - Class 58.22: ČSD Class 534.0
  - Class 58.23–27: PKP Class Ty23
  - Class 58.28: TCDD 56 (seized by the DRG from 1940 to 1942)
  - Class 58.29: PKP Class Ty37
  - Class 58.30: a reconstructed Prussian G 12 with a new design boiler converted for the DR in East Germany
- EAR 58 class
- New South Wales 58 class locomotive
