= EAR 58 class =

East African Railways 58 class
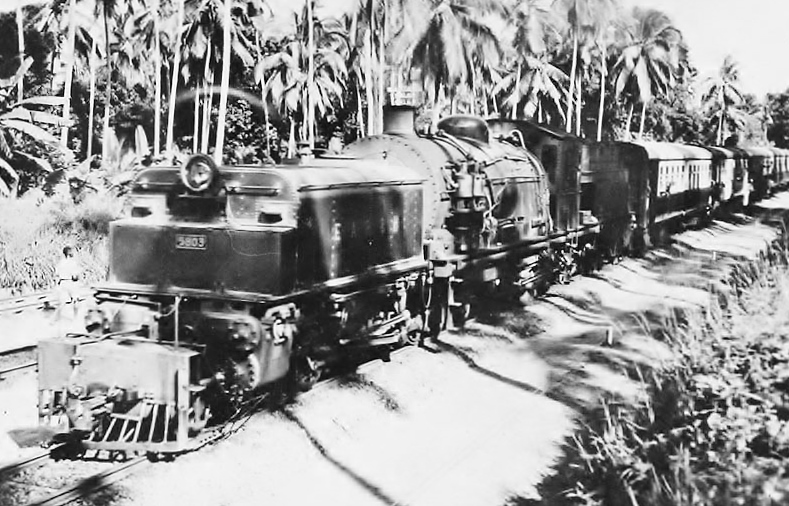
- 5803 at Changamwe, Kenya, with the Mombasa–Kampala mail train, circa 1950-51
Type and origin
- Power type: Steam
- Designer: Beyer, Peacock & Co.; K.C. Strahan; H.B. Stoyle
- Builder: Beyer, Peacock & Co.
- Serial number: 7290–7307
- Build date: 1949
- Total produced: 18
Specifications
- Configuration
  - Whyte: 4-8-4+4-8-4 Garratt
  - UIC: (2′D2′)(2′D2′) h4
- Gauge: 1,000 mm (3 ft 3 3/8 in)
- Driver dia.: 54 in (1,372 mm)
- Width: 114 in (2,900 mm)
- Adhesive weight: 94 long tons (96 t)
- Loco weight: 186.25 long tons (189.24 t)
- Fuel type: Oil
- Fuel capacity: 2,375 imp gal (10,800 L; 2,852 US gal)
- Water cap.: 6,000 imp gal (27,000 L; 7,200 US gal)
- Firebox
  - Grate area: 48.5 sq ft (4.51 m^{2})
- Boiler pressure: 225 psi (1.55 MPa)
- Heating surface
  - Firebox: 169 sq ft (15.7 m^{2})
  - Tubes: 1,963 sq ft (182.4 m^{2})
  - Total surface: 2,561 sq ft (237.9 m^{2})
- Superheater
  - Type: Inside
  - Heating area: 429 sq ft (39.9 m^{2})
- Cylinders: 4
- Cylinder size: 16.5 in × 26 in (419 mm × 660 mm)
- Valve gear: Walschaerts
- Valve type: Trunk type
- Valve travel: 5 in (130 mm)
- Loco brake: Westinghouse type
- Train brakes: Westinghouse type
- Safety systems: 3 Ross muffled pop valves
Performance figures
- Tractive effort: 50,200 lbf (223.30 kN)
Career
- Operators: East African Railways (EAR)
- Class: 58 class
- Number in class: 18
- Numbers: 5801–5818
- First run: 1949
- Disposition: All scrapped

The EAR 58 class was a class of 1,000 mm (3 ft 3 3/8 in) gauge 4-8-4+4-8-4 Garratt-type articulated steam locomotives built by Beyer, Peacock & Co. in Manchester, England, in 1949.

The eighteen members of the class were ordered by the Kenya-Uganda Railway (KUR) immediately after World War II, and were a slightly modified, oil-burning version of the KUR's existing coal-fired EC3 class. By the time the new locomotives were built and entered service, the KUR had been succeeded by the East African Railways (EAR), which designated the coal-fired EC3s as its 57 class, and the new, oil-burning EC3s as its 58 class.

== Class list ==
The numbers and build dates of each member of the class were as follows:

Builder's number	Built	KUR number	EAR number	Notes
7290	1949	89	5801	
7291	1949	90	5802	
7292	1949	91	5803	
7293	1949	92	5804	
7294	1949	93	5805	
7295	1949	94	5806	
7296	1949	95	5807	
7297	1949	96*	5808	First member of class to enter service with EAR number.
7298	1949	97*	5809	
7299	1949	98*	5810	
7300	1949	99*	5811	
7301	1949	100*	5812	
7302	1949	101*	5813	
7303	1949	102*	5814	
7304	1949	103*	5815	
7305	1949	104*	5816	
7306	1949	105*	5817	
7307	1949	106*	5818	
* KUR number allocated but not carried

== See also ==
- Rail transport in Kenya
- Rail transport in Uganda
