= W44 =

W44 may refer to:

- W44 (nuclear warhead)
- W44 Concentrate Train
- Tayoro Station, in Hokkaido, Japan
