= DL class =

DL class can refer to:

- Australian National DL class, diesel locomotive
- New Zealand DL class locomotive, diesel locomotive
- Queensland Railways DL class, diesel locomotive
- TR DL class, 4-8-0 steam locomotive
