= Class 29 =

Class 29 may refer to:

- British Rail Class 29
- ČSD Class EMU 29.0
- EAR 29 class
- Kaan 29-class patrol craft
- KTM Class 29
- M29-class monitor
- PKP class Pu29

== See also ==
- Type 29 (disambiguation)
