= EAR 30 class =

East African Railways 30 class
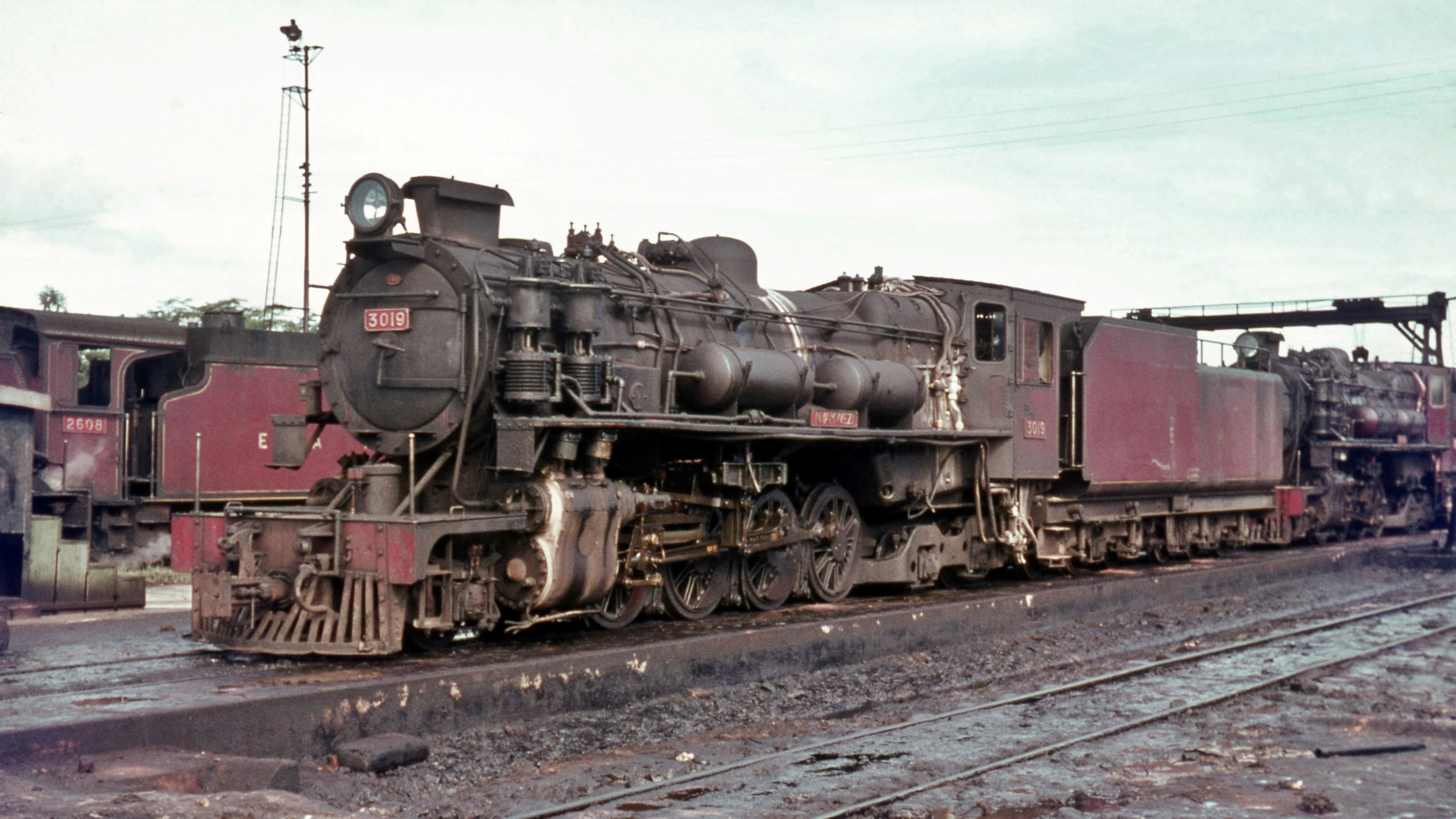
- No. 3019 Nyamwezi at Tabora depot, Tanzania, in 1968
Type and origin
- Power type: Steam
- Builder: North British Locomotive Company
- Serial number: 27447–27468; 27474–27477
- Build date: 1955
- Total produced: 26
Specifications
- Configuration
  - Whyte: 2-8-4
  - UIC: 1′D2' h2
- Gauge: 1,000 mm (3 ft 3 3/8 in)
- Driver dia.: 48 in (1,219 mm)
- Adhesive weight: 51.2 long tons (52.0 t)
- Loco weight: 77.7 long tons (78.9 t)
- Fuel type: Oil
- Fuel capacity: 1,950 imp gal (8,900 L; 2,340 US gal)
- Water cap.: 7,000 imp gal (32,000 L; 8,400 US gal)
- Firebox
  - Grate area: 38 sq ft (3.53 m^{2})
- Boiler pressure: 200 psi (1.38 MPa)
- Heating surface
  - Firebox: 146 sq ft (13.6 m^{2})
  - Tubes: 1,680 sq ft (156 m^{2})
  - Total surface: 2,272 sq ft (211.1 m^{2})
- Superheater
  - Type: Inside
  - Heating area: 446 sq ft (41.4 m^{2})
- Cylinders: 2
- Cylinder size: 18 in × 26 in (457 mm × 660 mm)
- Valve gear: Walschaerts
Performance figures
- Tractive effort: 29,835 lbf (132.71 kN)
Career
- Operators: East African Railways (EAR)
- Class: 30 class
- Number in class: 26
- Numbers: 3001–3026
- Delivered: 1955
- First run: 1955

The EAR 30 class was a class of oil-burning 1,000 mm (3 ft 3 3/8 in) gauge 2-8-4 steam locomotives. The class was built in 1955 by North British Locomotive Company in Glasgow, Scotland, for the East African Railways (EAR). Its design was derived from the 2-8-2 EAR 29 class, which, in turn, was based upon the Nigerian Railways River class.

The 26 members of the class served their entire careers in Tanganyika/Tanzania, one of the three territories/countries served by the EAR.

== Class list ==
The numbers and names of each member of the class were as follows:

Builder's number	EAR number	Name	Notes
27447	3001	Arusha	Later renamed Tanganyika
27448	3002	Bena	
27449	3003	Bondei	
27450	3004	Chagga	
27451	3005	Gogo	
27452	3006	Ha	
27453	3007	Haya	
27454	3008	Hehe	
27455	3009	Iramba	
27456	3010	Irakwu	
27457	3011	Luguru	
27458	3012	Makonde	
27459	3013	Makua	
27460	3014	Masai of Tanganyika	
27461	3015	Meru of Tanganyika	
27462	3016	Mwera	
27463	3017	Ngindo	
27464	3018	Nyakyusa	
27465	3019	Nyamwezi	
27466	3020	Nyaturu	Preserved at Nairobi Railway Museum; in operating condition as of 2014
27467	3021	Pare	
27468	3022	Pogoro	
27474	3023	Sambaa	
27475	3024	Sukuma	
27476	3025	Zaramo	
27477	3026	Zigua	

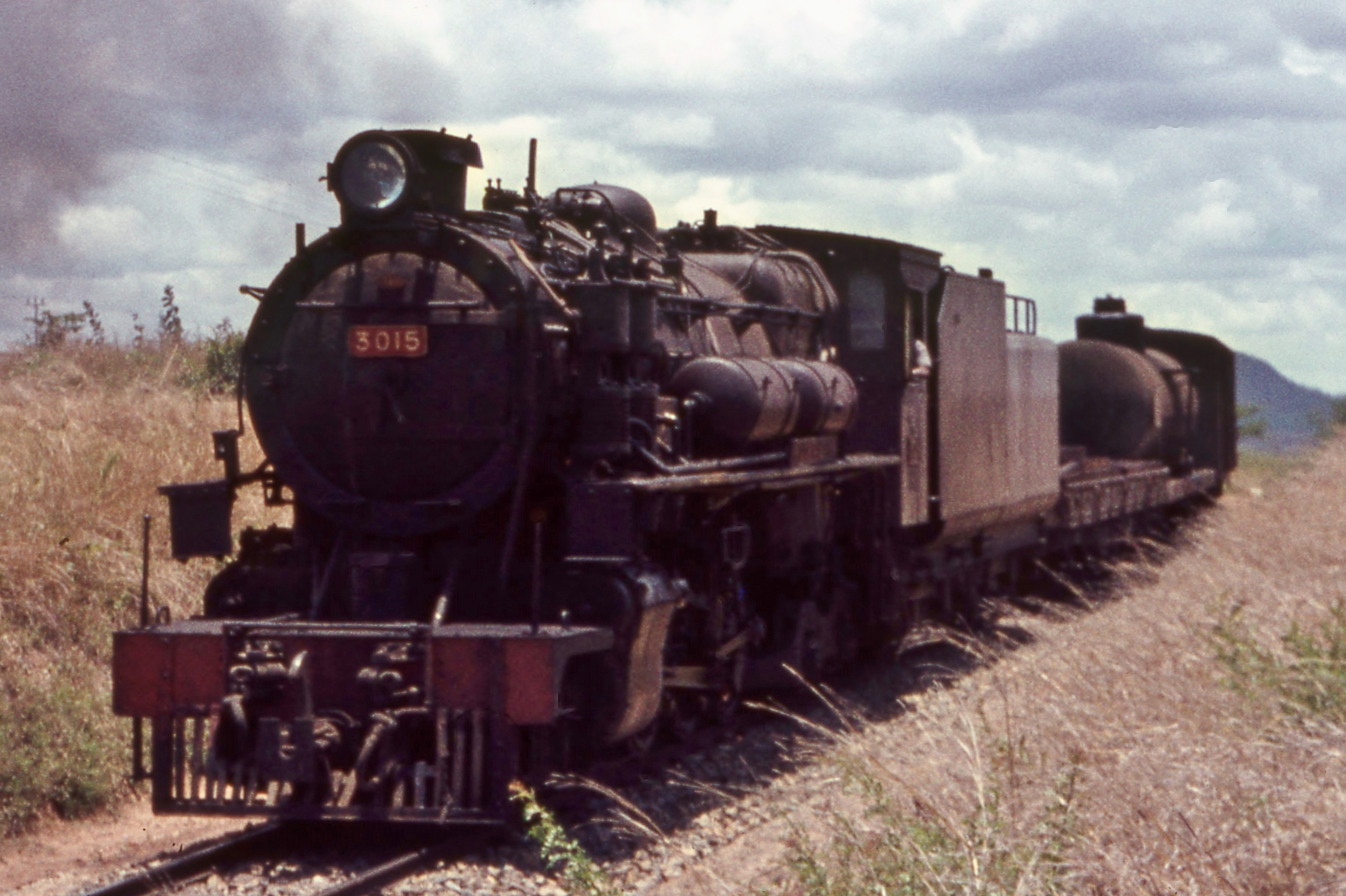
No. 3015 operating a freight train near Morogoro, Tanzania, in 1967

== See also ==
- History of rail transport in Tanzania
