= Type 29 =

Type 29 may refer to:

- Bugatti Type 29, an automobile made by Bugatti
- Bristol Type 29, a British civil utility biplane
- Peugeot Type 29, an automobile made by Peugeot
- Type 29, a British hardened field defence of World War II

== See also ==
- Class 29 (disambiguation)
