= New South Wales D57 class locomotive =

Class of Australian 4-8-2 locomotives

New South Wales D57 class
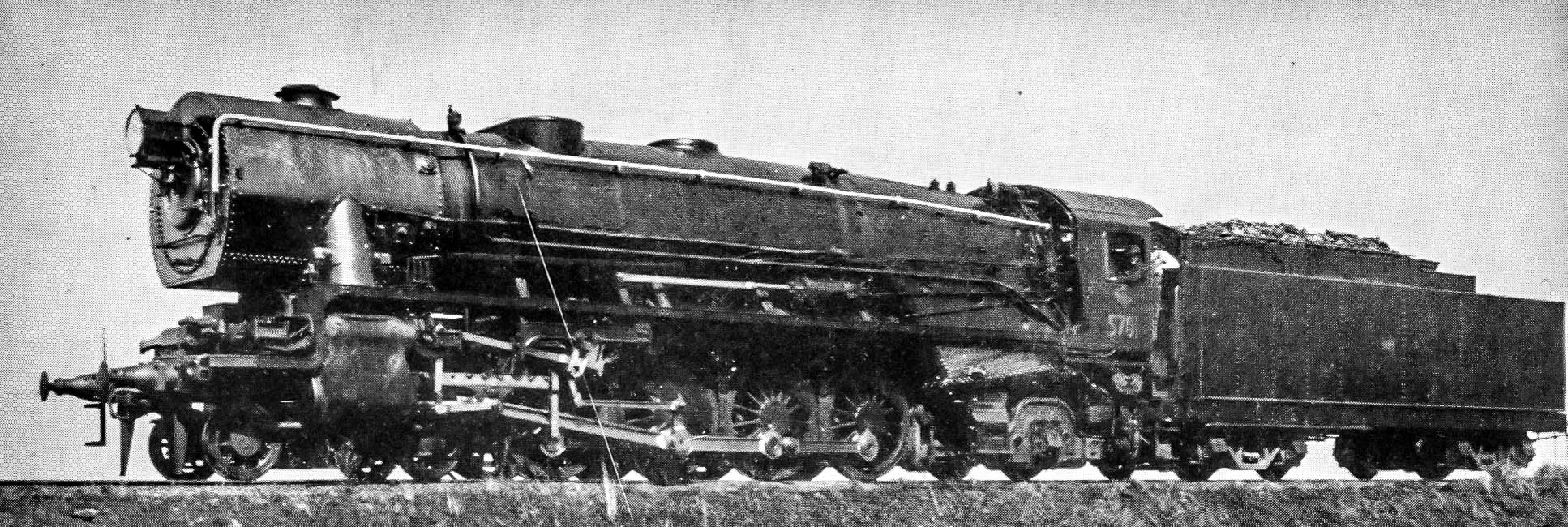
- Class D57 locomotive
Type and origin
- Power type: Steam
- Builder: Clyde Engineering, Granville (locomotives); Mort's Dock & Engineering Company (tenders)
- Build date: 1929–1930
- Total produced: 25
Specifications
- Configuration
  - Whyte: 4-8-2
- Gauge: 1435 mm (4 ft 8 1/2 in) standard gauge
- Leading dia.: 2 ft 7 in (787 mm)
- Driver dia.: 5 ft 0 in (1524 mm)
- Trailing dia.: 3 ft 6 in (1067 mm)
- Axle load: 23 long tons (25.8 short tons; 23.4 t)
- Adhesive weight: 201,600 lb (91,400 kg)
- Loco weight: 310,710 lb (140,936 kg)
- Fuel type: Coal
- Fuel capacity: 14 long tons (15.7 short tons; 14.2 t)
- Water cap.: 9000 imp gal (11,000 US gal; 41,000 L)
- Firebox
  - Grate area: 65 sq ft (6.0 m^{2})
- Boiler pressure: 200 psi (1379 kPa)
- Heating surface: 3390 sq ft (315 m^{2})
- Superheater
  - Heating area: 775 sq ft (72.0 m^{2})
- Cylinders: 3
- Cylinder size: 23.25 in × 28 in (591 mm × 711 mm)
- Valve gear: Outside (2): Walschaerts. Centre (1): Gresley conjugated
Performance figures
- Maximum speed: 50 mph (80 km/h)
- Tractive effort: 56,000 lbf (249.1 kN)
- Factor of adh.: 3.60
Career
- Operators: New South Wales Government Railways
- Class: D57
- Numbers: 5701–5725
- Nicknames: Lazy Lizzies
- Withdrawn: 1957–1961
- Disposition: 1 preserved, 24 scrapped

The New South Wales D57 class is a class of 4-8-2 steam locomotives built for the New South Wales Government Railways in Australia by Clyde Engineering and by Mort's Dock & Engineering Company in respect of the tenders. When they entered service in 1929, they represented a revolution in locomotive design, having a tractive effort 67% higher than the previous most powerful New South Wales locomotive, the 55 class.

== History ==
The locomotives were among the heaviest in Australia, having a 23-long-ton (23.4 t; 25.8-short-ton) axle load. This factor and their width restricted their sphere of operation to Thirroul on the Illawarra line, Wallerawang on the Main Western line and Junee on the Main South line.

Due to the immense size of the firebox, they could not be hand-fired so a mechanical stoker was fitted, the first New South Wales locomotive class to have one.

The locomotives were not permitted to operate on the Main Northern line due to load limitations on some bridges and a tighter loading gauge. They had the highest tractive effort of any non-articulated steam locomotives used in Australia and were of approximately equal capability to the modified 60 class Garratt locomotives. They were very reliable and had the nickname Lazy Lizzies because they made heavy working seem effortless. Another nickname, Chuckling Charlies, reflected their syncopated exhaust beat.

The three-cylinder design fitted to the class gave it a distinctive off-beat exhaust sound when climbing upgrade. However, a couple of features, such as the Gresley conjugating valve gear, have been the source of debate as to its efficiency. A further 13 were built to a similar design in 1950 as the 58 class.

Although primarily a freight locomotive, 5719 was trialled on the Melbourne Limited passenger train between Sydney and Cootamundra in 1942.

The first was withdrawn in October 1957, the last in September 1961. The last example in traffic was saved for preservation by the New South Wales Rail Transport Museum. In June 1975, 5711 was hauled from Enfield to Thirlmere by 3801. In September 2008 it was relocated to the Valley Heights Locomotive Depot Heritage Museum. The locomotive is to be relocated to Chullora in Sydney for a cosmetic restoration.

Experience with the D57 class led to design improvements in the three-cylinder 58 class, which entered service two decades later, the Gresley conjugating valve gear being replaced by rack and pinion gear.
