= Nairobi Railway Museum =

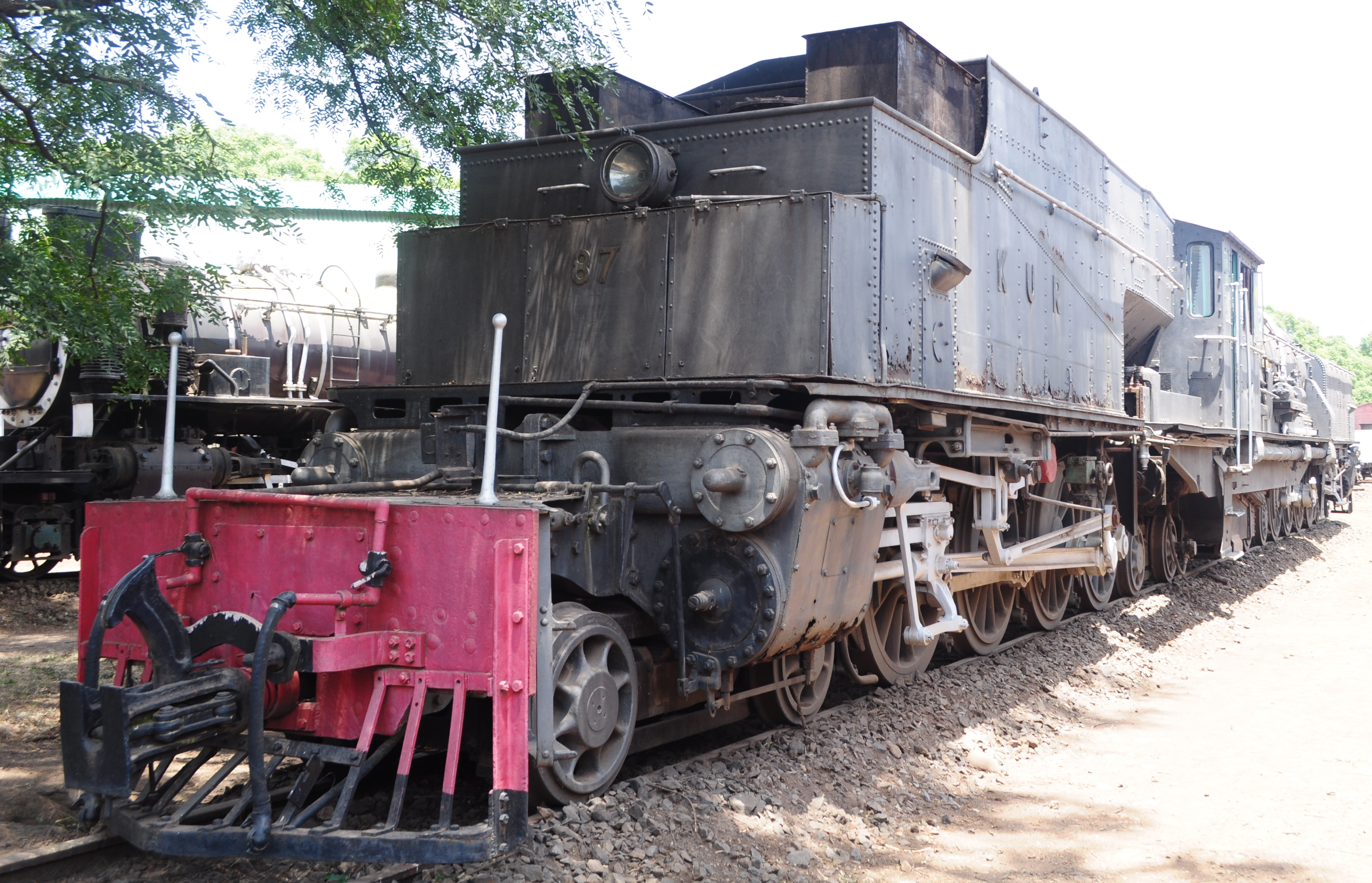
- KUR 87 Karamoja at the Museum
- Established: 1971
- Location: Station Road; 00200 Nairobi; Kenya
- Coordinates: 1°17′37″S 36°49′20″E
- Type: Railway museum
- Owner: Kenya Railways Corporation
- Public transit access: Nairobi railway station
- Website: Nairobi Railway Museum

The Nairobi Railway Museum is a railway museum in Nairobi, Kenya, adjacent to Nairobi railway station. Containing exhibits from the defunct East African Railways, it was opened in 1971 by East African Railways and Harbours Corporation. It is operated by Kenya Railways.

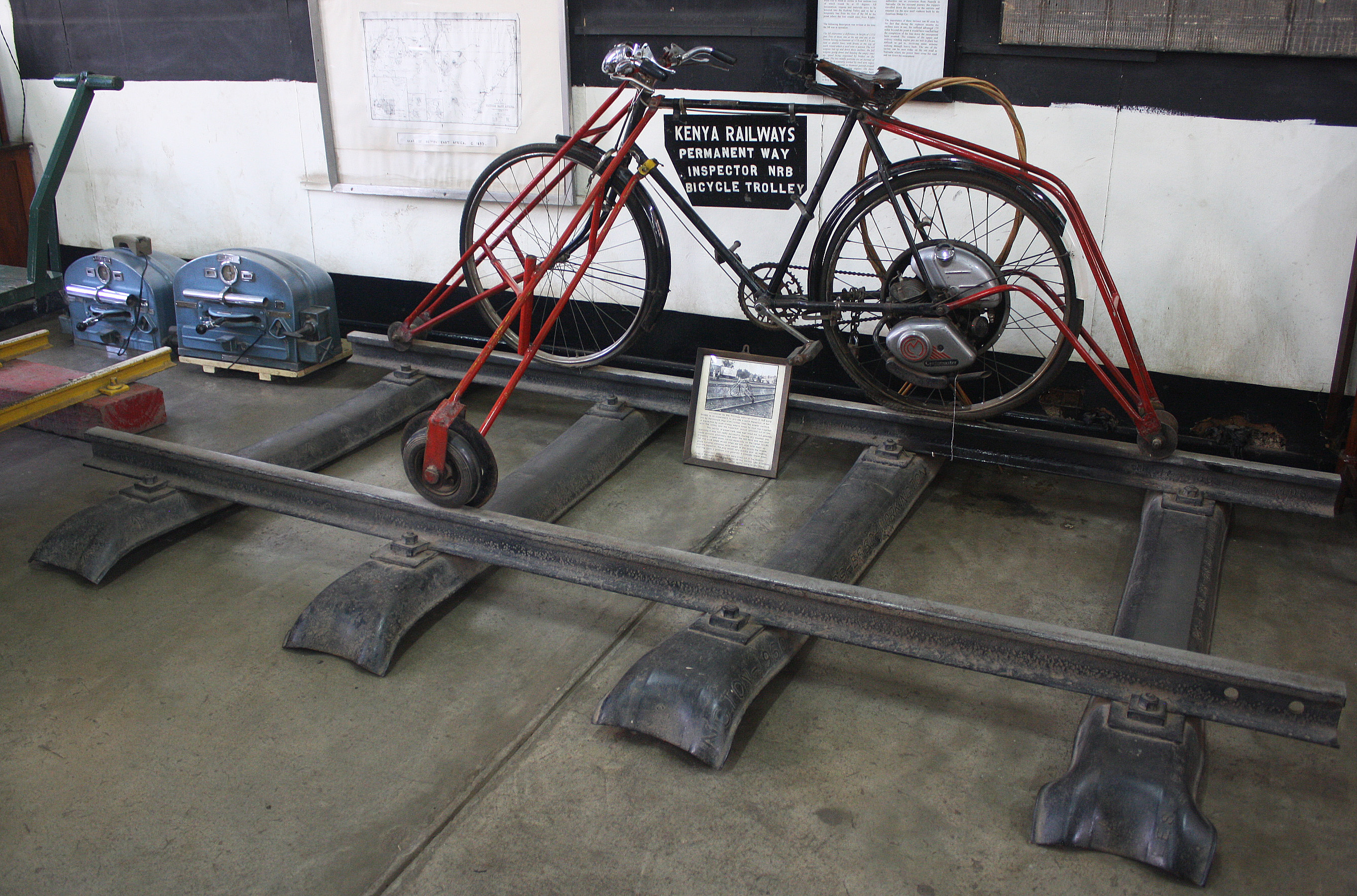
A bicycle-based draisine at the museum

The museum has maintained its rail connection. This allows for the efficient movement of museum exhibits for maintenance and placing items in the collection.

The three operational steam locomotives are stored securely under cover within the main railway works. Visitors must request an appointment to view them. They have not been used for several years. One of the display locomotives, 301 (2301) was used in the 1985 movie, Out of Africa.

The museum's collection also includes early diesel locomotives and passenger coaches. Friends of the Railway Museum East Africa (FORM East Africa), a concern encompassing Railway and Locomotive enthusiasts, has assisted in sourcing and securing artifacts for the museum.

In January 2011, a working miniature railway was installed to enhance activity at the museum. This miniature train was formerly used to promote Kenya Railways (KR) on exhibitions, such as the Nairobi Show. It consists of a locomotive with a petrol-engine, and several coaches made of wood.

== Exhibited locomotives ==
The museum exhibits a number of engines, including:

| Railway | Number | Name | Builder | Class | Wheel arrangement | EAR&H number | Status | Image |
|---|---|---|---|---|---|---|---|---|
| Kenya-Uganda Railway | 327 | | Vulcan Foundry | ED1 | 2-6-2T | EAR 1127 | Display | |
| Kenya-Uganda Railway | 87 | Karamoja | Beyer, Peacock & Company | EC3 | 4-8-4+4-8-4 | EAR 5711 | Display | |
| Kenya-Uganda Railway | 2401 | | Vulcan Foundry | EB3 | 4-8-0 | | Display | |
| Kenya-Uganda Railway | 2409 | | Vulcan Foundry | EB3 | 4-8-0 | | Operational stored in the main works | |
| Kenya-Uganda Railway | 5505 | | Beyer, Peacock & Company | GB | 4-8-2+2-8-4 | | Display | |
| Kenya-Uganda Railway | 393 | | Nasmyth Wilson | EE | 2-6-4T | EAR 1003 | Display | |
| Tanganyika Railway | 301* | | Beyer, Peacock & Company | DL | 4-8-0 | EAR 2301 | Display | |
| East African Railways | 2921 | Masai of Kenya | North British | Tribal | 2-8-2 | | Display | |
| East African Railways | 3020 | Nyaturu | North British | Tribal | 2-8-4 | | Operational stored in the main works | |
| East African Railways | 3123 | Bavuma | Vulcan Foundry | Tribal | 2-8-4 | | Display | |
| East African Railways | 5918 | Mount Gelai | Beyer, Peacock & Company | Mountain | 4-8-2+2-8-4 | | Operational stored in the main works | |
| East African Railways | 5930 | Mount Shengena | Beyer, Peacock & Company | Mountain | 4-8-2+2-8-4 | | Displayed at the Uhuru Gardens | |
| East African Railways | 6006 | Sir Harold MacMichael | Société Franco-Belge | Governor | 4-8-2+2-8-4 | | Display | |
| Magadi Soda Company | | Hugh F Marriott | WG Bagnall | | 0-4-0ST | | Displayed outside the main railway station | |

The museum's WG Bagnall engine, Hugh F Marriott, was built in Stafford, England, in 1951. It operated as a switcher at the Magadi Soda Company until 1970. In 2020, it was moved to a display outside Nairobi railway station. *301 was used in the 1985 movie Out of Africa.
