= 6029 =

Preserved New South Wales Garratt locomotive

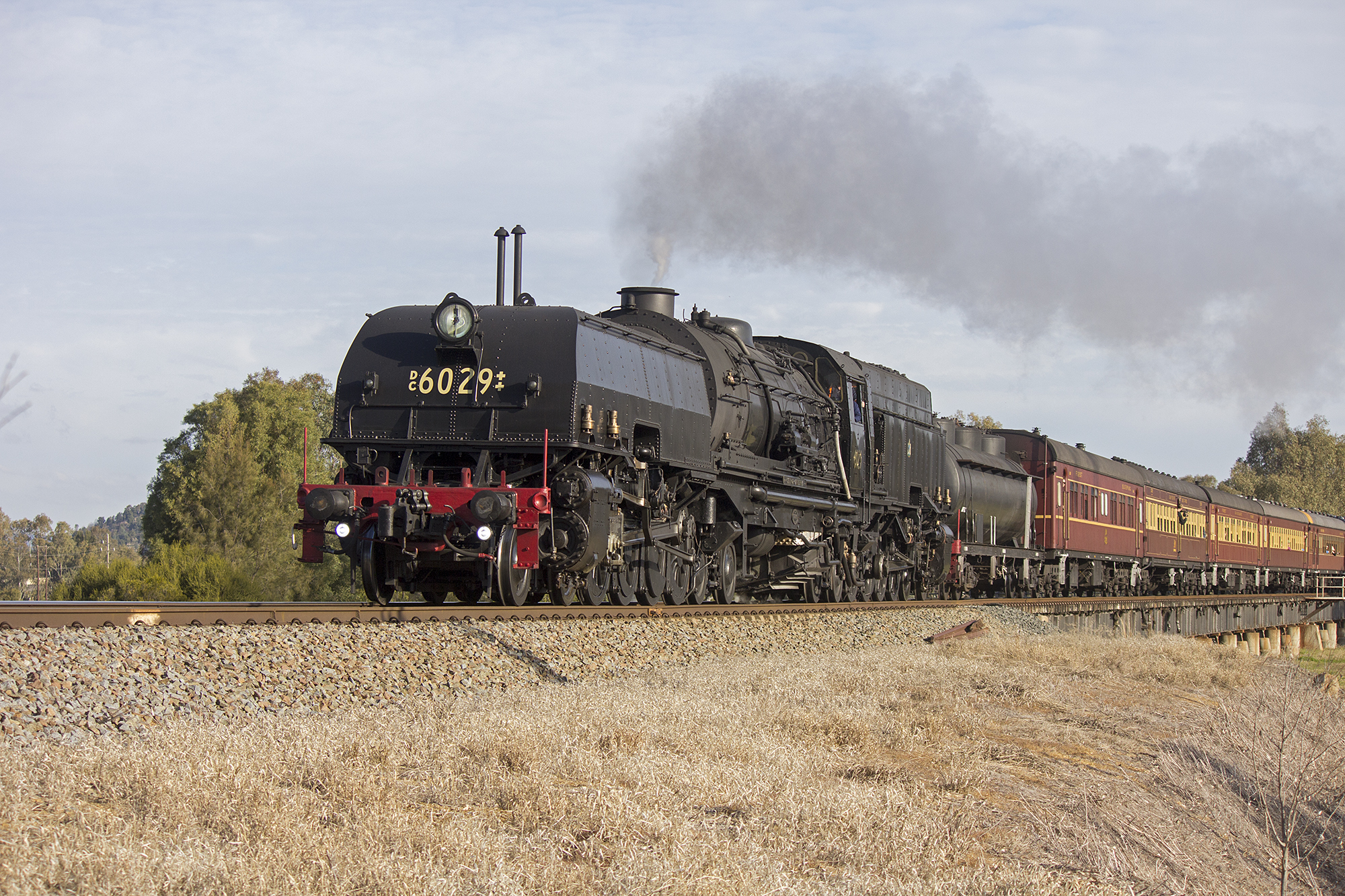
- 6029 at Wagga Wagga in June 2015
Type and origin
- Power type: Steam
- Builder: Beyer, Peacock & Company, Manchester
- Serial number: 7531
- Build date: 1954
Specifications
- Configuration
  - Whyte: 4-8-4+4-8-4
- Gauge: 1,435 mm (4 ft 8 1/2 in) standard gauge
- Driver dia.: 4 ft 7 in (1,397 mm)
- Adhesive weight: 282,000 lb (128 t) or 317,000 lb (144 t)
- Loco weight: 562,000 lb (255 t) or 582,000 lb (264 t)
- Fuel type: Coal
- Fuel capacity: 14 long tons (14 t), later 18 long tons (18 t)
- Firebox
  - Grate area: 65 sq ft (6.0 m^{2})
- Boiler pressure: 200 psi (1.38 MPa)
- Heating surface: 3,030 sq ft (281 m^{2})
- Superheater
  - Heating area: 750 sq ft (70 m^{2})
- Cylinders: Four
- Cylinder size: 19 1/4 in × 26 in (489 mm × 660 mm) or 19 7/8 in × 26 in (505 mm × 660 mm)
- Valve gear: Walschaerts
Performance figures
- Tractive effort: 59,560 lbf (264.9 kN)
- Factor of adh.: 4.73 or 4.99
Career
- Operators: New South Wales Government Railways
- Class: AD60
- Numbers: 6029
- First run: 24 April 1954
- Withdrawn: September 1972
- Current owner: Transport Heritage NSW
- Disposition: Operational

6029 is simple, non-condensing, superheated, 4-8-4+4-8-4 AD60 class Garratt steam locomotive built by Beyer, Peacock & Company, England, for the New South Wales Government Railways.

== Service ==
6029 entered service in 1954 on the Main North line also working on the Main South and later Main Western line. On 17 February 1959 the locomotive was converted to dual control and had an extension to the coal bunker, increasing its coal capacity.

It was withdrawn in September 1972 and condemned on 4 January 1973. In 1974, the National Museum of Australia acquired the locomotive and placed it in the custody of the Australian Railway Historical Society's Canberra Railway Museum. It worked from Sydney to Goulburn in December 1974 before hauling a special charter to Canberra on 5 January 1975.

It was restored to operational condition and operated heritage trains for the Canberra Railway Museum. 6029 became the only locomotive of its class to operate interstate when it visited Victoria in 1980, participating in a parallel run to Wangaratta with Victorian Railways locomotive K153. Heritage tours continued over several years until boiler problems caused the locomotive to be withdrawn from service in 1981.

In 1994, a feasibility study determined what was needed to get 6029 back in steam. In February 1998, ownership passed to the Canberra Railway Museum.

A replacement boiler was obtained from a Victorian sawmill. Restoration commenced in 2007, being completed in July 2014. After mainline trials, 6029 received official mainline accreditation in December 2014, with the first public trips taking place on 28 February 2015.

On 23 February 2015, the locomotive was named City of Canberra by Shane Rattenbury, the Speaker of the ACT Legislative Assembly. In 2017, it was put up for sale by the liquidator of the Canberra Railway Museum when the museum went into liquidation and was purchased by Phillip Davis and David Sommerville and moved to the NSW Rail Museum.

Due to the locomotive no longer being based in Canberra, its City of Canberra nameplates were removed in late 2017. This was due to the locomotive no longer based in Canberra and for historic reasons as the AD60s were barred from travelling though single line tunnels during their service, of which three exist between Bungendore and Queanbeyan on the Bombala railway line.

On 7 May 2022, Transport Heritage NSW announced that it had purchased 6029.
