= BBÖ 181 =

BBÖ 181 DRB 58.8 ÖBB 158 JDZ 29
Type and origin
- Builder: Wiener Neustädter Lokomotivfabrik
- Build date: 1922–1923
- Total produced: BBÖ: 27; ÖBB: 8 JDŽ/JŽ: 15
Specifications
- Configuration
  - Whyte: 2-10-0
  - German: 1′E h2v
- Gauge: 1,435 mm (4 ft 8 1/2 in)
- Leading dia.: 1,034 mm (3 ft 4 3/4 in)
- Driver dia.: 1,298 mm (4 ft 3 1/8 in)
- Wheelbase
  - Overall: 8,600 mm (28 ft 2 1/2 in)
  - incl. tender: 14,983 mm (49 ft 2 in)
- Length
  - Over beams: 18,185 mm (59 ft 8 in)
- Height: 4,650 mm (15 ft 3 1/8 in)
- Adhesive weight: 70.0 t (68.9 long tons; 77.2 short tons)
- Service weight: 81.0 t (79.7 long tons; 89.3 short tons)
- Tender type: 156
- Fuel capacity: 6.8 t (15,000 lb) of coal
- Water cap.: 16.0 m^{3} (3,500 imp gal; 4,200 US gal)
- Boiler
- No. of heating tubes: 194
- Heating tube length: 4,700 mm (15 ft 5 in)
- Boiler pressure: 16.0 kgf/cm^{2} (1.57 MPa; 228 lbf/in^{2})
- Heating surface
  - Firebox: 4.14 m^{2} (44.6 sq ft)
  - Radiative: 15.5 m^{2} (167 sq ft)
  - Tubes: 174.0 m^{2} (1,873 sq ft)
  - Evaporative: 189.5 m^{2} (2,040 sq ft)
- Superheater
  - Heating area: 50.2 m^{2} (540 sq ft)
- Cylinders: 2
- High-pressure cylinder: 620 mm (24 7/16 in)
- Low-pressure cylinder: 870 mm (34 1/4 in)
- Piston stroke: 632 mm (24 7/8 in)
- Train brakes: Air
Performance figures
- Maximum speed: 55 km/h (34 mph)
Career
- Numbers: BBÖ: 181.01 – 181.27; DRB: 58 801 – 58 827; ÖBB: 158
- Retired: 1953

The BBÖ 181 was a class of 27 two-cylinder compound 2-10-0 tender locomotives of the Federal Railways of Austria (Bundesbahnen Österreichs, BBÖ).

== History ==
After the First World War, two-cylinder simple locomotive designs became more and more popular because of the lower acquisition and operating costs. Since the now smaller Austria had lost almost all of its coal reserves, the coal-saving compound locomotives were reconsidered and 27 of the BBÖ 81 locomotives under construction by the Wiener Neustädter Lokomotivfabrik were equipped as composite locomotives. Due to the large low-pressure cylinder, the leading axle had to be moved further forward. The boiler pressure could be increased to 18 kgf/cm^{2} (1.77 MPa; 256 lbf/in^{2}) compared to 15 kgf/cm^{2} (1.47 MPa; 213 lbf/in^{2}) of the 81 series.

The locomotives were designated as the 181 series and were delivered in 1922 and 1923; they were used mainly in mountain service.

However, due to falling coal prices, interest in compound locomotives was soon lost again, and so the 181 series was the last compound locomotive series built in Austria.

In 1938 they all came to the Deutsche Reichsbahn as 58 801–827, but the Deutsche Reichsbahn had no interest in them. After the Second World War, eight of them came to the ÖBB, which they planned as series 158, but which were retired in 1953. Fifteen locomotives went as class 29 to the Yugoslav State Railways (JDŽ) and were initially given the numbers 29–101 to 29–115. In 1948 they were renumbered to JDŽ 29–028 to 29-042.
