= Nigerian Railways River class =

Class of West African 2-8-2 locomotives

Nigerian Railways "River" class
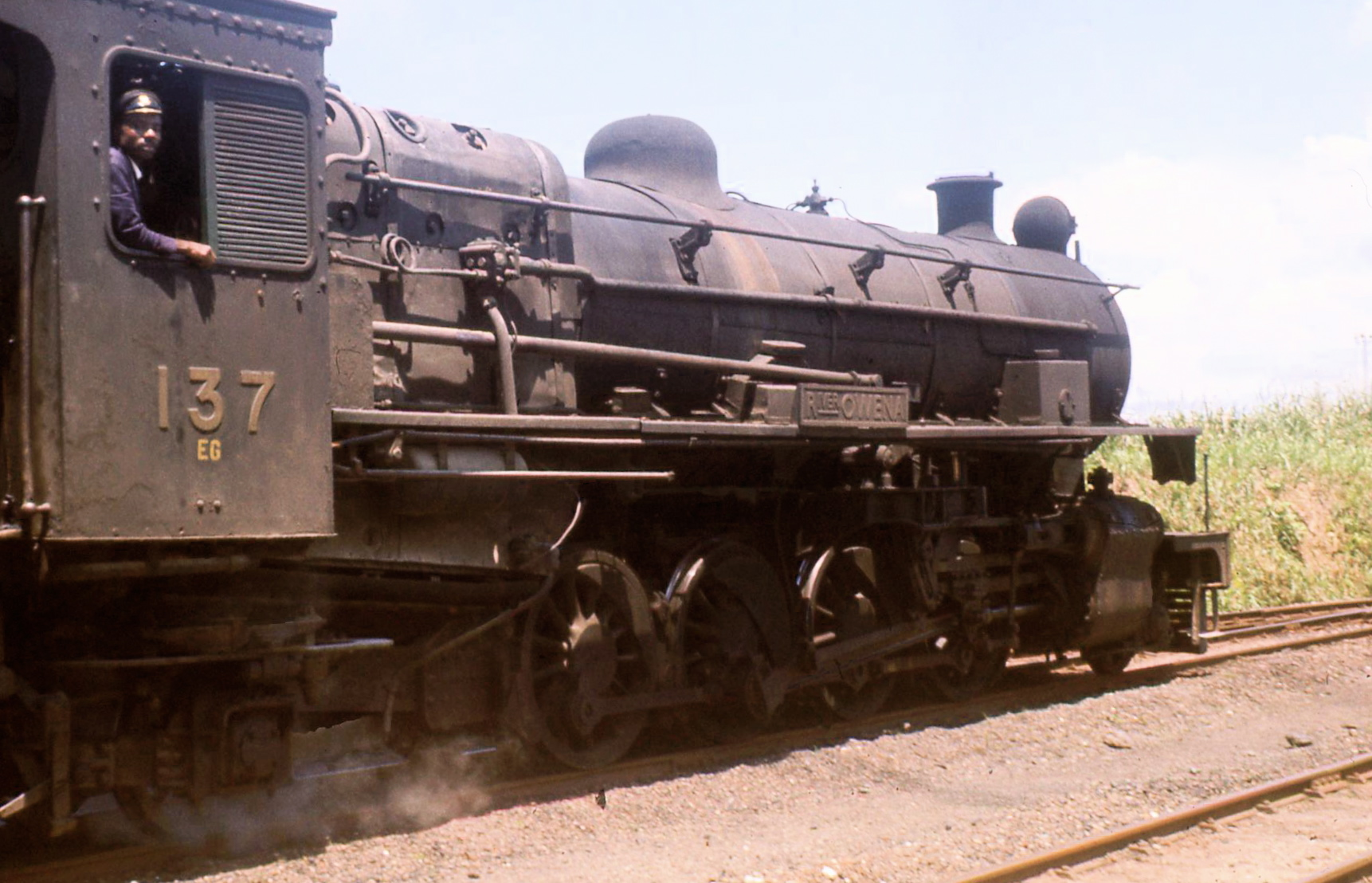
- No. 137 River Owena near Port Harcourt, August 1974.
Type and origin
- Power type: Steam
- Builder: Vulcan Foundry
- Build date: 1947–
Specifications
- Configuration
  - Whyte: 2-8-2
  - UIC: 1'D1'h
- Gauge: 3 ft 6 in (1,067 mm)
- Driver dia.: 48 in (1.22 m)
- Water cap.: 4,000 imp gal (18,000 L; 4,800 US gal)
- Cylinders: Two, outside
- Cylinder size: 18 in × 26 in (457 mm × 660 mm)
- Train brakes: Vacuum
Career
- Operators: Nigerian Railways
- Class: River

The Nigerian Railway River class locomotive had a 2-8-2 wheel arrangement.

== History ==
The first were built in 1947 by Vulcan Foundry, and several additional orders were delivered in later years by different manufacturers.

They were fitted with Vacuum brakes supplied by the Vacuum Brake Company.

== Similar locomotives ==
Similar locomotives were built for Malawi and East Africa.

== See also ==
- EAR 29 class
- EAR 30 class
- EAR 31 class
- Preservation
