= New South Wales D58 class locomotive =

Australian three-cylinder 4-8-2 locomotives

New South Wales D58 class
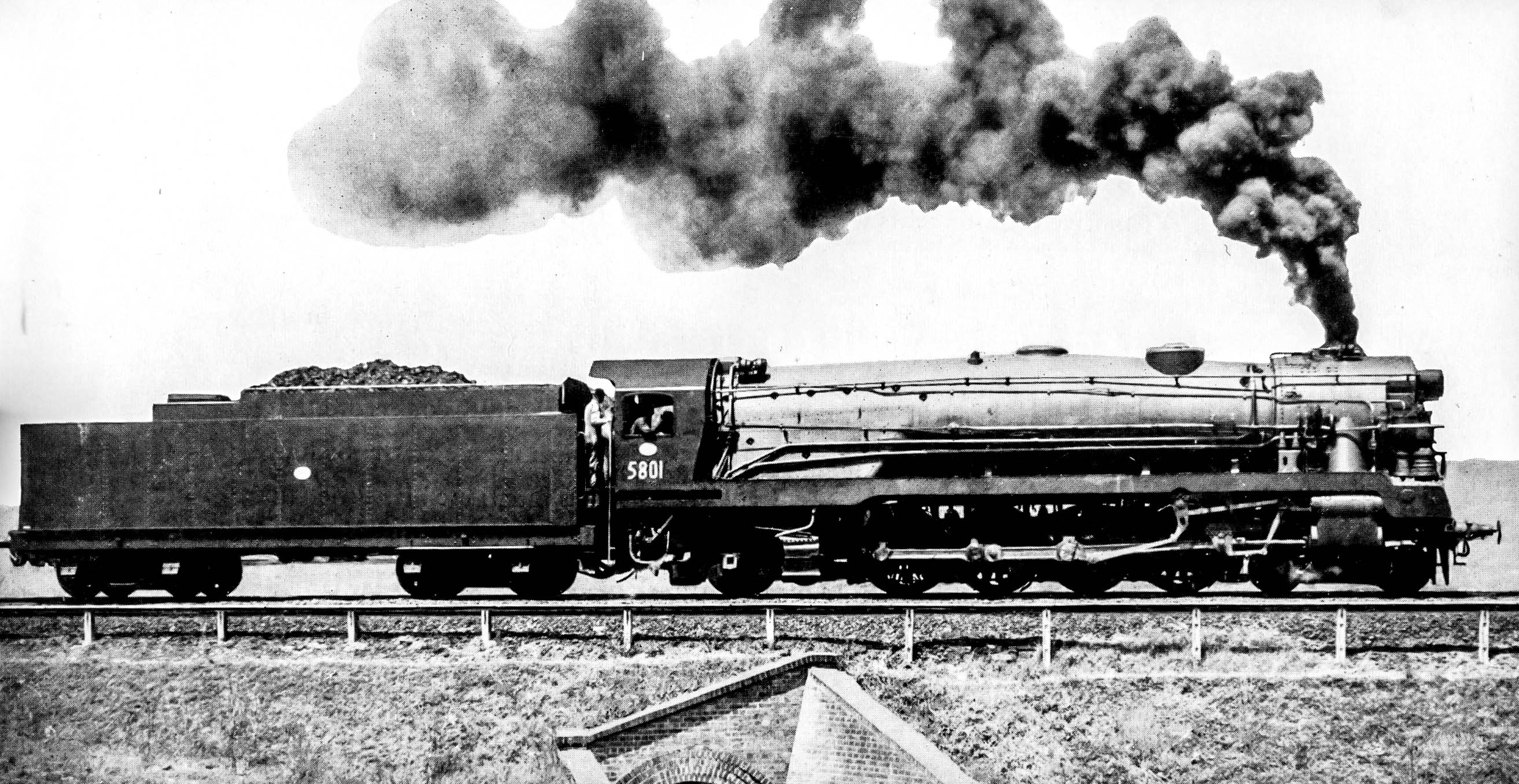
- Class D58 locomotive
Type and origin
- Power type: Steam
- Builder: Eveleigh Railway Workshops (11); Cardiff Locomotive Workshops (2)
- Build date: 1950–1952
- Total produced: 13
Specifications
- Configuration
  - Whyte: 4-8-2
  - UIC: 2'D1'h3g
- Gauge: 4 ft 8 1/2 in (1,435 mm) standard gauge
- Leading dia.: 2 ft 7 in (787 mm)
- Driver dia.: 5 ft 0 in (1,524 mm)
- Trailing dia.: 3 ft 6 in (1,067 mm)
- Adhesive weight: 201,600 lb (91,444 kg; 91 t)
- Loco weight: 311,000 lb (141,067 kg; 141 t)
- Fuel type: Coal
- Fuel capacity: 14 long tons (15.7 short tons; 14.2 t)
- Water cap.: 9000 imp gal (11,000 US gal; 41,000 L)
- Firebox
  - Grate area: 65 sq ft (6.04 m^{2})
- Boiler pressure: 200 psi (1.38 MPa)
- Heating surface: 3,390 sq ft (314.94 m^{2})
- Superheater
  - Heating area: 775 sq ft (72.00 m^{2})
- Cylinders: Three
- Cylinder size: 21.5 in × 28 in (546 mm × 711 mm)
- Valve gear: Outside: Walschaerts. Derived (middle): Rack and pinion
Performance figures
- Tractive effort: 56,000 lbf (249.1 kN)
- Factor of adh.: 3.6
Career
- Operators: New South Wales Government Railways
- Class: D58
- Numbers: 5801–5813
- Withdrawn: 1956–1957
- Disposition: All scrapped, with exceptions to some tenders.

The D58 class was a class of steam locomotives built by the New South Wales Government Railways in Australia. They were built with the 4-8-2 wheel arrangement.

== Design ==
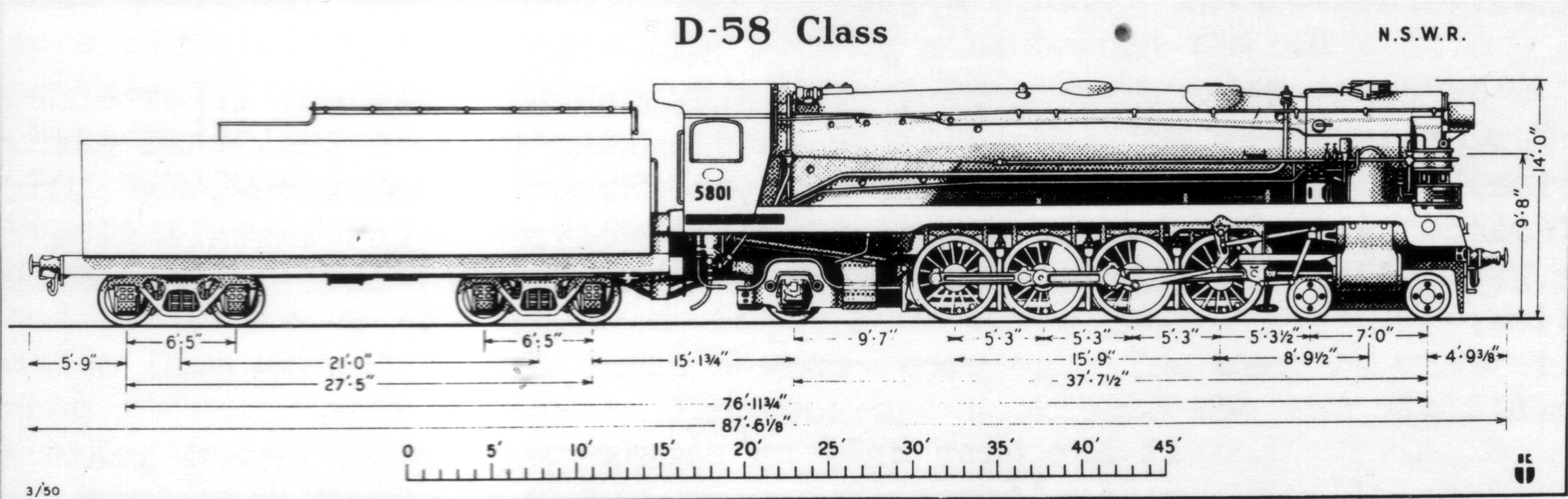

In 1943, approval was given for the New South Wales Government Railways Workshops to build 25 freight locomotives. The design was a modified version of the 57 class. The main alterations were the use of a rack and pinion valve gear in lieu of the Gresley 2:1 conjugated valve gear for the middle cylinder and the use of smaller cylinders to enable the locomotives to run to on the Main North line to Broadmeadow, a route which had a tighter loading gauge. They also used a Woodard divided drive of twin coupling rods between the second and third driving wheels. A valance was fitted over the valve gear on the front platform. Similarly to the earlier D57 class and the later AD60 class, the 58 class were fitted with a mechanical stoker to feed the large firebox

== Construction ==
Eveleigh Railway Workshops built 11 locomotives and Cardiff Locomotive Workshops with two. The first entered service in March 1950. The decision to move to diesel power saw only 13 locomotives completed.

== Operations ==
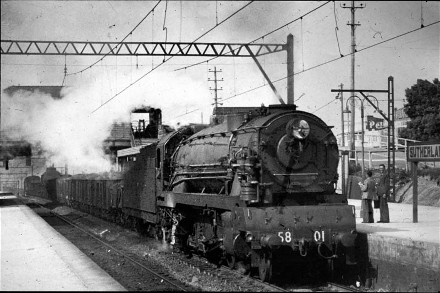
5801 hauls a South Coast freight train into Sutherland station

Whilst the derived rack and pinion valve gear appeared superior in theory, in practice it required more maintenance and lubrication. The smaller diameter cylinders of the 58 class (21.1/2") compared to the earlier 57 class (23.1/4") demanded a later cut-off and thus used more steam. This could cause the locomotives to be uneconomical in the use of coal and water when compared with the 57 class, but the 58's longer valve travel ameliorated this problem if the locomotive was driven as the modified design was intended. Despite the design being made to enable use on the Main Northern line from Sydney to Broadmeadow, few journeys were ever made on this route. They mainly were used on the Main Western line to Lithgow and in a limited capacity on the Main South line to Junee.

After a very short service life, the entire class had been withdrawn by July 1957 and were all cut up by March 1964. Some parts were recovered and used on 57 class locomotives. There are no surviving examples, however the tender of 5808 lies near Canberra station as an old fuel tank for a Canberra-based diesel shunter (now disused). Some 58 class tenders saw further use as water tankers around New South Wales. One is at the Dorrigo Steam Railway and Museum.

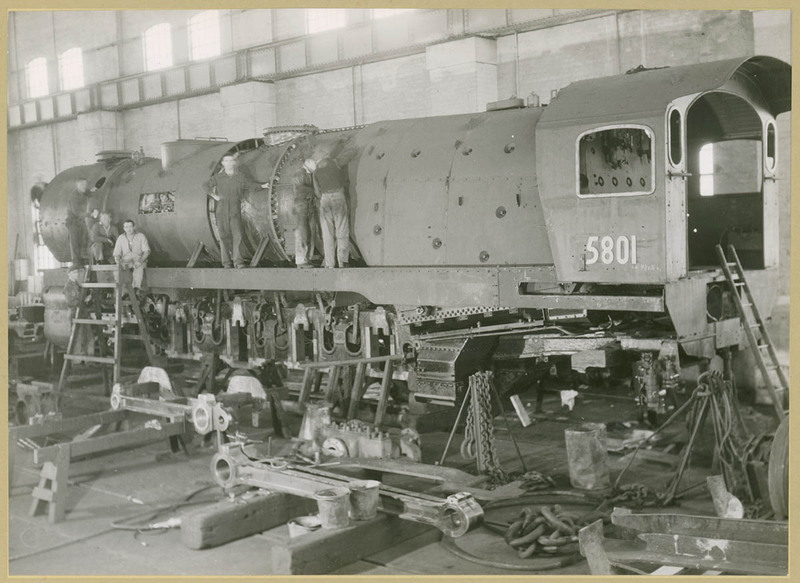
5801 under construction at Eveleigh Railway Workshops in 1949
