= TR DL class =

Tanganyika Railway DL class East African Railways 23 class
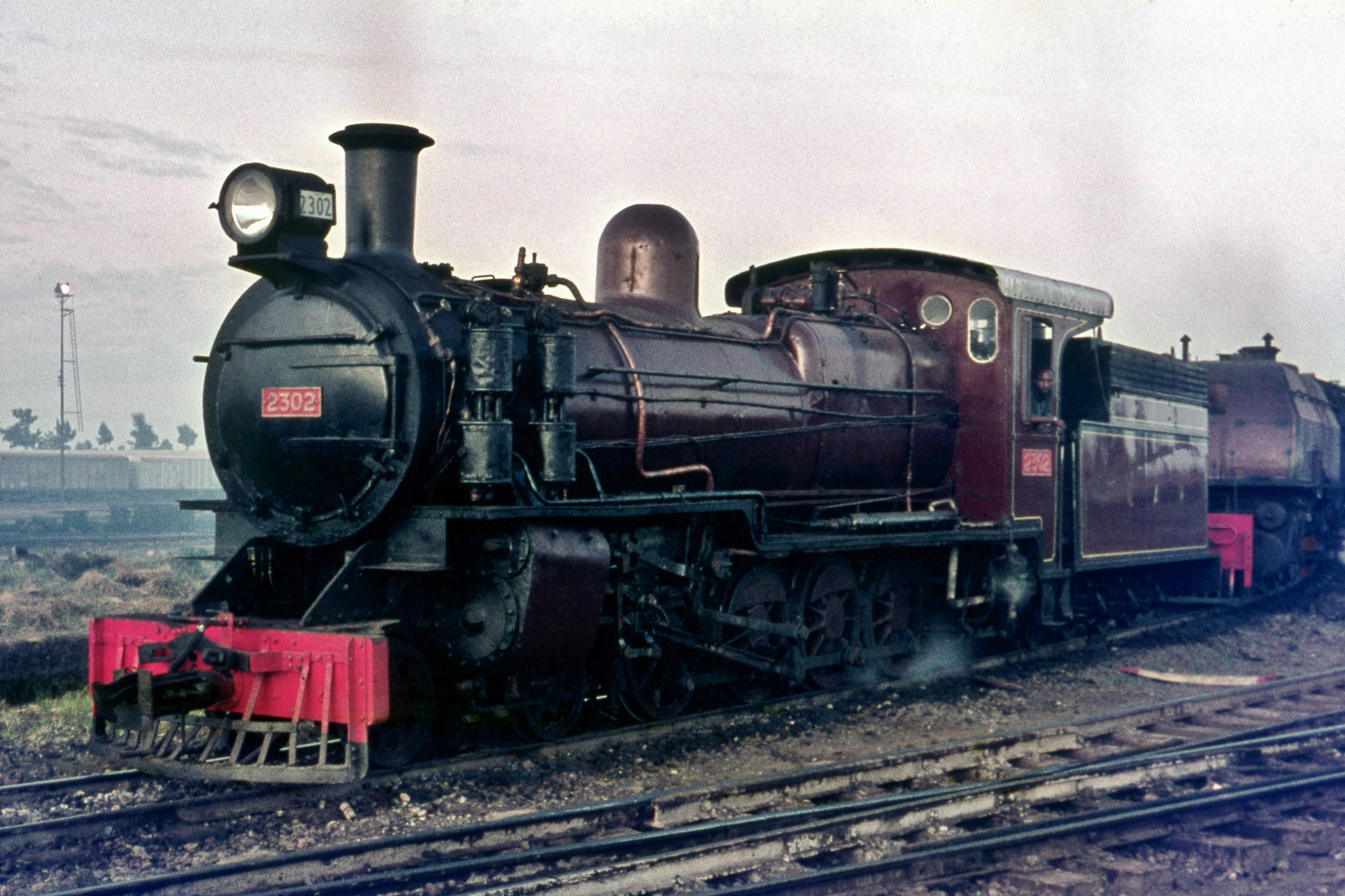
- No. 2302 at Nairobi in 1968
Type and origin
- Power type: Steam
- Builder: Beyer, Peacock & Co.
- Serial number: 6128–6133
- Build date: 1923
- Total produced: 6
Specifications
- Configuration
  - Whyte: 4-8-0
  - UIC: 2′D1' h2
- Gauge: 1,000 mm (3 ft 3 3/8 in)
- Driver dia.: 43 in (1,092 mm)
- Adhesive weight: 37.7 long tons (38.3 t)
- Loco weight: 49.8 long tons (50.6 t)
- Fuel type: Oil
- Fuel capacity: 2,019 imp gal (9,180 L; 2,425 US gal)
- Water cap.: 2,500 imp gal (11,000 L; 3,000 US gal)
- Firebox
  - Grate area: 18.3 sq ft (1.70 m^{2})
- Boiler pressure: 160 psi (1.10 MPa) (165 psi (1.14 MPa))
- Heating surface
  - Firebox: 129 sq ft (12.0 m^{2})
  - Tubes: 945 sq ft (87.8 m^{2})
  - Total surface: 1,323 sq ft (122.9 m^{2})
- Superheater
  - Heating area: 249 sq ft (23.1 m^{2})
- Cylinders: 2
- Cylinder size: 18 in × 23 in (457 mm × 584 mm)
Performance figures
- Tractive effort: 24,300 lbf (108.09 kN)
Career
- Operators: Tanganyika Railway (TR); → East African Railways (EAR)
- Class: TR: DL class; EAR: 23 class
- Number in class: 6
- Numbers: TR: 200–205/300–305; EAR: 2301–2306
- Delivered: 1923
- Disposition: 1 preserved, Remainder likely scrapped

The TR DL class, later known as the EAR 23 class, was a class of 1,000 mm (3 ft 3 3/8 in) gauge 4-8-0 steam locomotives derived from the Nigerian Railways Emir class. The six members of the DL/23 class were built by Beyer, Peacock & Co. in Gorton, Manchester, England, for the Tanganyika Railway (TR). They entered service on the TR in 1923, and were later operated by the TR's successor, the East African Railways (EAR).

== Class list ==
The builder's and fleet numbers of each member of the class were as follows:

Builder's number	1st TR number	2nd TR number	EAR number	Notes
6128	200	300	2301	
6129	201	301	2302	Preserved at Nairobi Railway Museum as a static exhibit (and as TR 301)
6130	202	302	2303	
6131	203	303	2304	
6132	204	304	2305	
6133	203	303	2306	

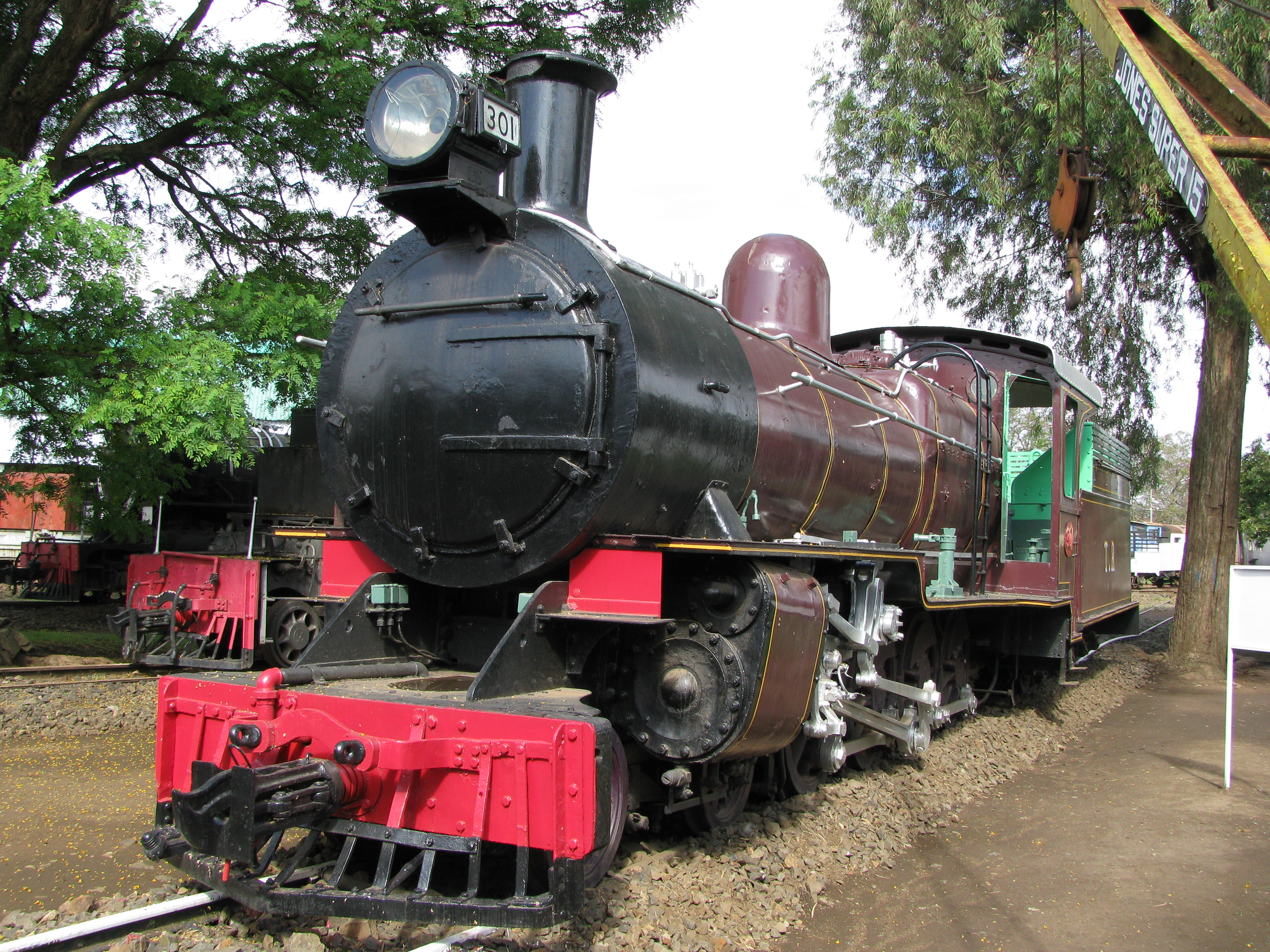
The same locomotive, numbered and liveried as TR 301, at Nairobi Railway Museum, 2010

== See also ==
- History of rail transport in Tanzania
- Rail transport in Kenya
- Rail transport in Uganda
