= New South Wales AD60 class locomotive =

Class of four-cylinder Garratt locomotives

New South Wales AD60 class
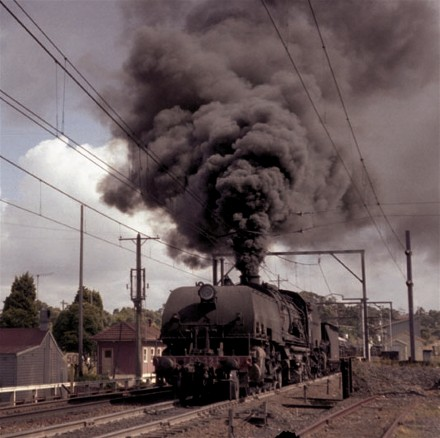
- 6012 at the top of Cowan Bank
Type and origin
- Power type: Steam
- Builder: Beyer, Peacock & Company; Manchester
- Serial number: 7473–7497, 7528–7539, 7540-7544
- Build date: 1952–1954, 1956
- Total produced: 42
Specifications
- Configuration
  - Whyte: 4-8-4+4-8-4
- Gauge: 1,435 mm (4 ft 8 1/2 in) standard gauge
- Driver dia.: 4 ft 7 in (1,397 mm)
- Length: 108 ft 7 in (33.096 m)
- Adhesive weight: 282,000 lb (128,000 kg) later 317,000 lb (144,000 kg)
- Loco weight: 562,000 lb (255,000 kg) later 582,000 lb (264,000 kg)
- Fuel type: Coal
- Fuel capacity: 14 long tons (14.2 tonnes; 15.7 short tons) later 18 long tons (18.3 tonnes; 20.2 short tons)
- Firebox
  - Grate area: 65 sq ft (6.0 m^{2})
- Boiler pressure: 200 psi (1.38 MPa)
- Heating surface: 3,030 sq ft (281 m^{2})
- Superheater
  - Heating area: 750 sq ft (70 m^{2})
- Cylinders: 4
- Cylinder size: 19.25 in × 26 in (489 mm × 660 mm) later 19.875 in × 26 in (505 mm × 660 mm)
- Valve gear: Walschaerts
Performance figures
- Tractive effort: 59,560 lbf (264.9 kN) later 63,490 lbf (282.4 kN)
- Factor of adh.: 4.73 or 4.99
Career
- Operators: New South Wales Government Railways
- Class: AD60
- Number in class: 42
- Numbers: 6001–6042
- First run: July 1952
- Last run: March 1973
- Preserved: 6029, 6039, 6040, 6042
- Disposition: 4 preserved, 38 scrapped

The New South Wales AD60 class were Beyer-Garratt patent articulated four-cylinder, simple, non-condensing, coal-fired superheated, 4-8-4+4-8-4 heavy goods steam locomotives built by Beyer, Peacock & Company for the New South Wales Government Railways in Australia.

== Design ==
The AD60 class 4-8-4+4-8-4 Beyer-Garratt patent consists of a boiler carried on a separate frame in the centre of the locomotive and supported by the frames of the two engines, one at each end. The locomotive thus consists of three parts: a front engine unit carrying a water tank, an intermediate chassis pivoted to each engine unit supporting a boiler and cab, and a rear engine unit carrying a coal bunker and water tank. The class had a coupled axle load of 16 long tons (16.3 t; 17.9 short tons) and could negotiate 6-chain (120 m; 400 ft) curves.

The design incorporated the most modern technology to minimise maintenance and repairs, including:

- integral cast steel engine bed frames incorporating the cylinders
- large steel boiler with roundtop firebox and flexible stays
- mechanical stoker
- roller bearings fitted to bogie, coupled wheels and crankpins
- valve gear operated by Hadfield powered reversing gear

== Introduction ==
This was the only type of Garratt locomotive to operate on the New South Wales Government Railways. Designed to a light axle load of only 16 long tons (16.3 t; 17.9 short tons), they were intended for hauling feeder branch-line services to the main lines where heavier main-line locomotives could continue with the load.

In 1949, twenty-five were ordered from Beyer, Peacock & Company, followed by a further twenty-five. Following a change of policy in favour of diesel traction, negotiations were entered into, in order to cancel the last part of the order. Forty-two complete locomotives were delivered, together with spare parts equating to approximately five further locomotives. The five sets of parts did not include engine unit frames. The cancellation contract stipulated that the NSWGR could not assemble the spare parts into complete locomotives without paying substantial royalties to Beyer-Peacock. The last three locomotives were cancelled completely and the assembly positions at the Gorton Works of Beyer-Peacock were sold to the South African Railways.

The locomotives were delivered in their five major component pieces: Front engine, rear engine, boiler-cab, rear bunker and front water tank. These five sub assemblies were built into a complete locomotive in NSW.

Locomotive 6002 was the first to enter service in July 1952 with the last, 6040 delivered on 2 January 1957. The locomotives were the most powerful to operate in Australia but behind the D57 in terms of tractive effort.

== Improvements ==
Early trials established that the 14-long-ton (14.2 t; 15.7-short-ton) bunker was insufficient to allow the locomotives to operate from Enfield to Goulburn resulting in the bunkers being enlarged to carry 18 long tons (18 t; 20 short tons). Ventilation of the cabs caused considerable concern. Consequently, the class was banned from working through single-line tunnels, this ban also being in response to the difficulty crews would have climbing out in the event of failure within such tunnels. Amongst attempts to improve cab ventilation, 6011 was experimentally fitted in September 1952 with a large tube along the front bunker and boiler to funnel air from the front of the locomotive into the cab. It was unsuccessful and was removed in 1955. Some improvement was obtained by running the locomotives bunker first.

Owing to the length and noise of the locomotive, crews found difficulty in hearing warning detonators. To rectify the situation, tubes were fitted to convey the sound from the leading wheels to the cab. This mechanism can still be seen today on 6040 at the NSW Rail Museum.

When it became apparent that the Garratts would see more service on main lines than on the lighter branch lines, it was decided to increase the tractive effort of a number of the class by enlarging the cylinder diameter and by altering the weight distribution by removing liners from the bogies. This increased the axle load on each of the driving wheels by approximately 2 long tons (2.0 t; 2.2 short tons) with 30 locomotives treated. To distinguish these improvements the double plus sign ++ was painted after the number and they were nicknamed Super Garratts. These 30 were also fitted with dual controls for bunker first running and denoted DC. To accommodate them, 105-foot (32 m) turntables were installed at Broadmeadow, Enfield and Werris Creek depots.

== Operation ==
The class initially entered service on the Main North and Main South and later Main Western line as far as Dubbo and Parkes. Because of their light axle load they were cleared to operate on the Crookwell, Captains Flat, Temora, Narrandera and Bourke lines.

Typical workings in the mid 1960s would consist of bulk export coal and general goods movements :

Typical class AD60 traffic
Route	Traffic	Down (tons)	Up (tons)	Notes
Glenlee to Rozelle Yard	Export coal	1,500		
Gosford to Broadmeadow	Export coal	1,500		double-headed AD60s
Gosford to Broadmeadow	General freight	685 (single)	1,100 (assisted)	
Broadmeadow to Muswellbrook	General freight	775	1,150	
Newstan/Awaba Colliery to Wangi Power Station	Export coal	1,075	1,500	assisted
Enfield to Goulburn	General freight	900	1,500	
From Botany Oil Refineries	Petroleum	1,000		
Goulburn to Captains Flat	Mineral	600	600	
Junee	Goods	600	600	
Cootamundra to Stockinbingal	Goods	1,000	1,500	
Up to Lithgow				assisting until electrification in 1957
Parkes to Goobang Junction	Goods	1,000	1,400	16-ton axle load locos only
Dubbo to Merrygoen	Goods	1,100	1,000	16-ton axle load locos only
Parkes to Bogan Gate/Tottenham	Goods	1,000	1,400	16-ton axle load locos only
Portland to Pipers Flat	Cement	700		
Pipers Flat to Wallerawang	Cement	1,400		
Dubbo to Werris Creek	Goods	1,100		
Lithgow to Bathurst	Goods	850	900	
Orange to Parkes	Goods	600		
Bathurst westward	Goods	850	900	dependent on grade
W44 Broken Hill	Concentrates	575	600	double-headed AD60s
Molong to Orange	Goods	600	600	double-headed AD60s

== Demise and preservation ==
6012 was the first of the class to be withdrawn in February 1956. It was rumoured that the loco had been dropped while being unloaded. The next few to be withdrawn suffered accident damage in major collisions in 1961 (6003 Geurie) and 1963 (6028 Glenlee - rebuilt and returned to service by 1965).

In September 1968, the highest numbered member of the class, 6042, was to be shopped at Cardiff Locomotive Workshops for overhaul. At the same time, 6010 already made up from a mix of original parts including the boiler cradle from 6043, the front water tank of 6039 and the coal bunker of 6021 was nearing completion in the same works. As pressure was increasing upon the works staff to expedite steam locomotive overhauls, the decision was taken to switch numbers between the two, which gave the impression to management that "6042" had received an overhaul in one day. Photographs were taken of the two locomotives together. The real 6042 (mis-identified as 6021) was towed away and scrapped in early 1969 with the replacement locomotive operating until March 1973.

Dieselisation accounted for the gradual withdrawal of the other 39 of the class from 1965. The last withdrawn was the replacement "6042", which operated the final New South Wales Government Railways steam service on 22 February 1973. Shortly after, it was chosen to work the ceremonial Last Steam Train from Newcastle to Broadmeadow on 2 March 1973, where it was ceremonially driven through a celebratory banner by Transport Minister Milton Morris.

Number	Year	Owner	Location	Status	Ref
6029	1954	Transport Heritage NSW	Thirlmere	Operational	
6039	1956	Dorrigo Steam Railway & Museum	Dorrigo	Displayed but not open to the public	
6040	1957	Transport Heritage NSW	Thirlmere	Static exhibit	
6042	1956	Dorrigo Steam Railway & Museum	Forbes	Derelict on private land	
