= KUR EC3 class =

Kenya-Uganda Railway EC3 class; East African Railways 57 class
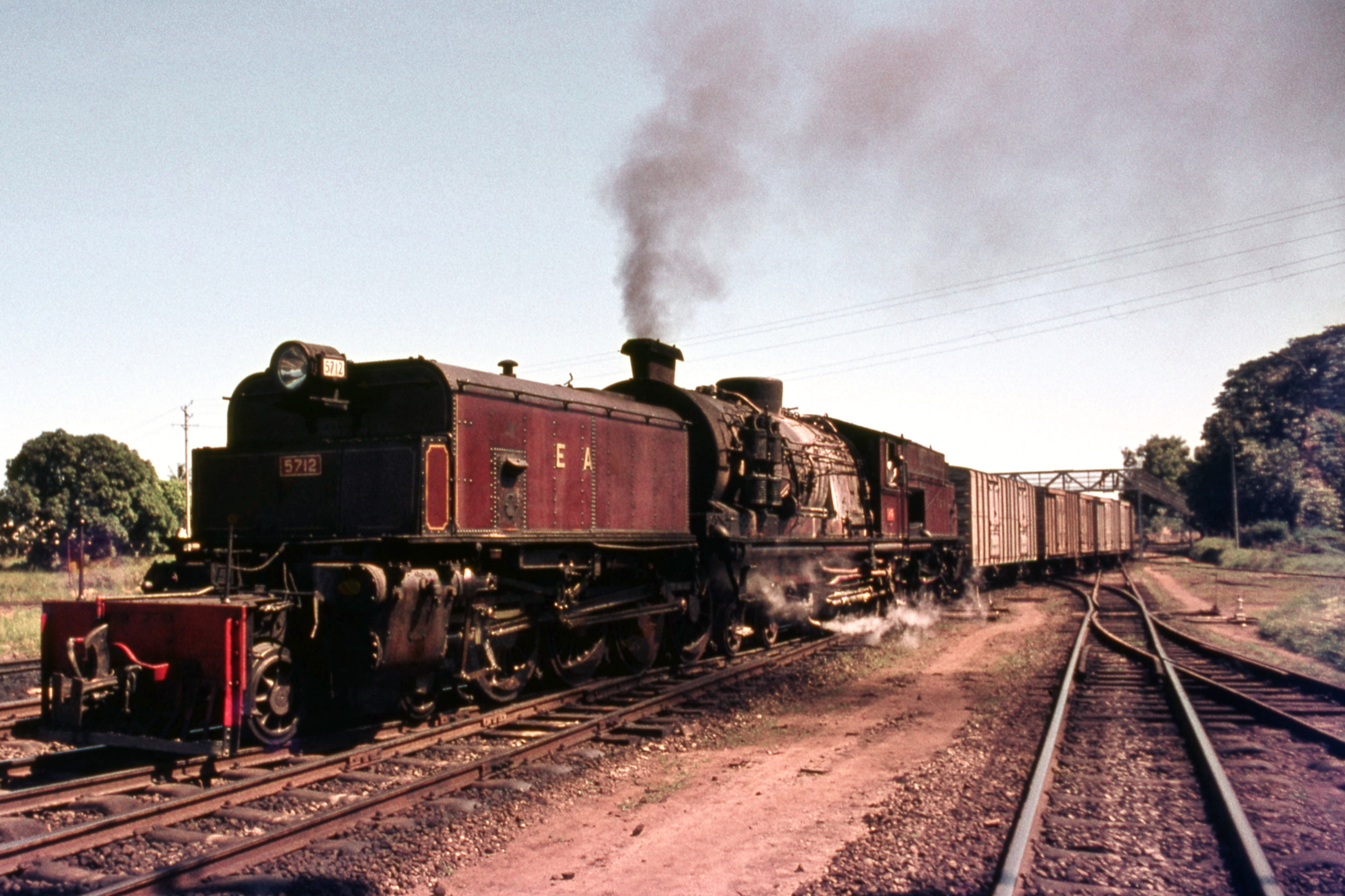
- No. 5712 Kigezi with a freight train at Mombasa, Kenya, in 1969
Type and origin
- Power type: Steam
- Designer: Beyer, Peacock & Co.; K.C. Strahan; H.B. Stoyle
- Builder: Beyer, Peacock & Co.
- Serial number: 6905–6910, 6970–6975
- Build date: 1939, 1940
- Total produced: 12
Specifications
- Configuration
  - Whyte: 4-8-4+4-8-4 (Garratt)
  - UIC: (2′D2′)(2′D2′) h4
- Gauge: 1,000 mm (3 ft 3 3/8 in)
- Driver dia.: 4 ft 6 in (1,372 mm)
- Width: 9 ft 6 in (2,900 mm)
- Height: 12 ft 5.5 in (3.797 m)
- Adhesive weight: 97 long tons (99 t)
- Loco weight: 186.2 long tons (189.2 t)
- Fuel type: Coal
- Fuel capacity: 12 long tons (12 t)
- Water cap.: 6,000 imp gal (27,000 L; 7,200 US gal)
- Firebox
  - Grate area: 48.5 sq ft (4.51 m^{2})
- Boiler pressure: 220 psi (1.52 MPa); (225 psi (1.55 MPa))
- Heating surface
  - Firebox: 169 sq ft (15.7 m^{2})
  - Tubes: 1,963 sq ft (182.4 m^{2})
  - Total surface: 2,561 sq ft (237.9 m^{2})
- Superheater
  - Type: Inside
  - Heating area: 429 sq ft (39.9 m^{2})
- Cylinders: 4 (Garratt)
- Cylinder size: 16 in × 26 in (406 mm × 660 mm)
- Valve gear: Walschaerts
- Valve type: Trunk type
- Valve travel: 5 in (130 mm)
- Loco brake: Westinghouse type
- Train brakes: Westinghouse type
- Safety systems: 3 Ross muffled pop valves
Performance figures
- Tractive effort: 47,200 lbf (209.96 kN)
Career
- Operators: Kenya-Uganda Railway (KUR); → East African Railways (EAR)
- Class: KUR: EC3 class; EAR: 57 class
- Number in class: 12
- Numbers: KUR: 77–88; EAR: 5701–5712
- First run: 1939
- Withdrawn: 1967
- Preserved: KUR 87 (EAR 5711)
- Disposition: One preserved, remainder scrapped

The KUR EC3 class, later known as the EAR 57 class, was a class of 1,000 mm (3 ft 3 3/8 in) gauge 4-8-4+4-8-4 Garratt-type articulated steam locomotives. The twelve members of the class were built by Beyer, Peacock & Co. in Manchester, England, for the Kenya-Uganda Railway (KUR). They entered service between 1939 and 1941, and were later operated by the KUR's successor, the East African Railways (EAR).

== Class list ==
The numbers, build dates and names of each member of the class were as follows:

Builder's number	Built	KUR number	EAR number	Name	Notes
6905	1939	77	5701	Mengo	
6906	1939	78	5702	Teso	
6907	1939	79	5703	Uasingishu	
6908	1939	80	5704	Narok	
6909	1939	81	5705	Marakwet	
6910	1939	82	5706	Wajir	
6970	1940	83	5707	Chua	
6971	1940	84	5708	Gulu	
6972	1940	85	5709	Lango	
6973	1940	86	5710	Budama	
6974	1940	87	5711	Karamoja	Preserved at Nairobi Railway Museum, as KUR 87.
6975	1940	88	5712	Kigezi	

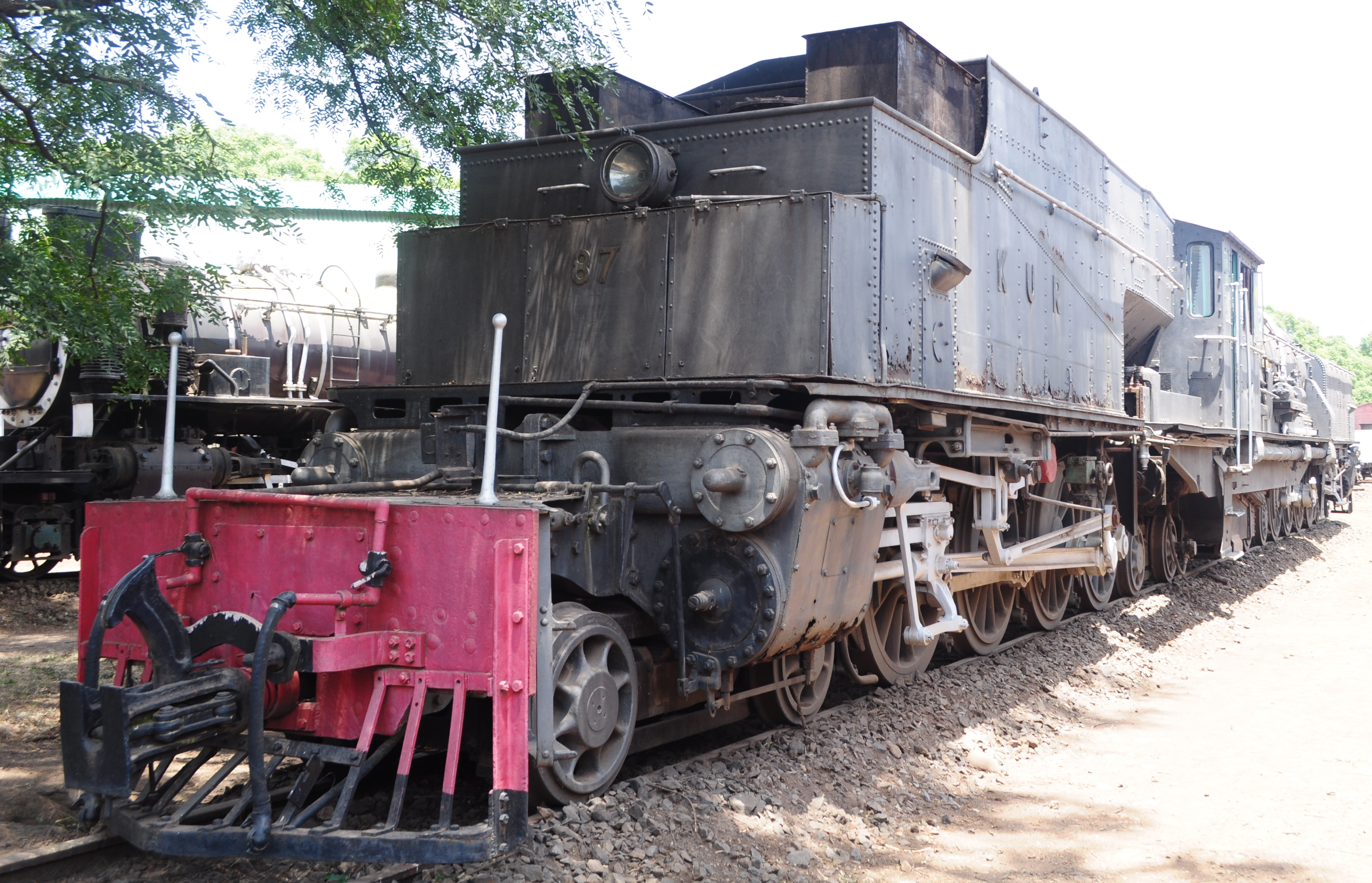
KUR 87 Karamoja at Nairobi Railway Museum, 2012

== See also ==
- Rail transport in Kenya
- Rail transport in Uganda
