= 4-8-4+4-8-4 =

Garratt locomotive wheel arrangement

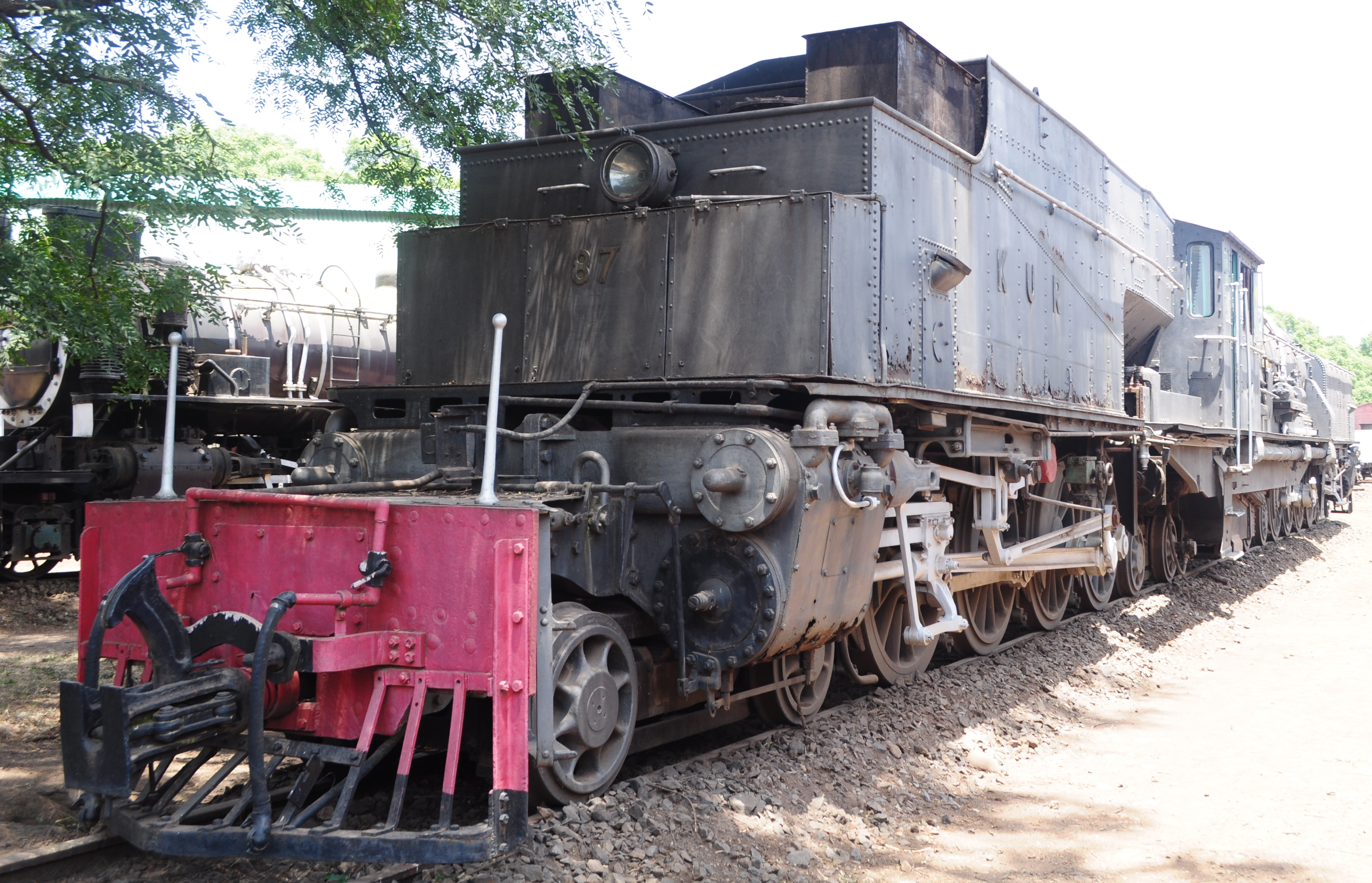
- KUR EC3 class, 1939
Equivalent classifications
- UIC class: 2D2+2D2
- French class: 242+242
- Turkish class: 48+48
- Swiss class: 4/8+4/8, 8/16 from the 1920s
- Russian class: 2-4-2+2-4-2
First known tank engine version
- First use: 1939
- Country: Kenya & Uganda
- Locomotive: KUR EC3 class
- Railway: Kenya-Uganda Railway
- Designer: Beyer, Peacock & Company
- Builder: Beyer, Peacock & Company
- Evolved from: 4-8-2+2-8-4

Under the Whyte notation for the classification of steam locomotives by wheel arrangement, the 4-8-4+4-8-4 is a Garratt locomotive. The wheel arrangement is effectively two 4-8-4 locomotives operating back to back, with the boiler and cab suspended between the two engine units. Each engine unit has two pairs of leading wheels in a leading bogie, followed by four coupled pairs of driving wheels and two pairs of trailing wheels in a trailing bogie.

== Overview ==
There were only two classes of 4-8-4+4-8-4 steam locomotives worldwide, all of which were constructed by Beyer, Peacock & Company, the owners of the Garratt patent.

The predecessor 4-8-2+2-8-4 Double Mountain was likely the optimal Garratt wheel arrangement, with the four-wheeled leading bogies and the two-wheeled trailing trucks on each engine unit ensuring stability at speed and with sixteen coupled wheels for traction. More coupled wheels would inhibit the locomotive on tight curves. The advantages of more non-coupled wheels, such as on the Double Northern, was firstly to reduce the axle loading, and more importantly to resist hunting if a zero reciprocating balance approach was used, as in the case of the NSWGR 60 class.

4-8-4+4-8-4 Garratt production list – All manufacturers
Gauge	Railway	Class	Works no.	Units	Year	Builder
1,000 mm	Kenya Uganda Railway	EC3	6905-6910	6	1939	Beyer, Peacock & Company
1,000 mm	Kenya Uganda Railway	EC3	6970-6975	6	1940	Beyer, Peacock & Company
1,000 mm	Kenya Uganda Railway	EC3	7290-7307	18	1949	Beyer, Peacock & Company
4 ft 8 1/2 in	New South Wales Government Railways	AD60	7473-7497	25	1952	Beyer, Peacock & Company
4 ft 8 1/2 in	New South Wales Government Railways	AD60	7528-7544	17	1952	Beyer, Peacock & Company
4 ft 8 1/2 in	New South Wales Government Railways	AD60 in pieces as spares	7545-7549	5	1952	Beyer, Peacock & Company

== Use ==
=== Australia ===
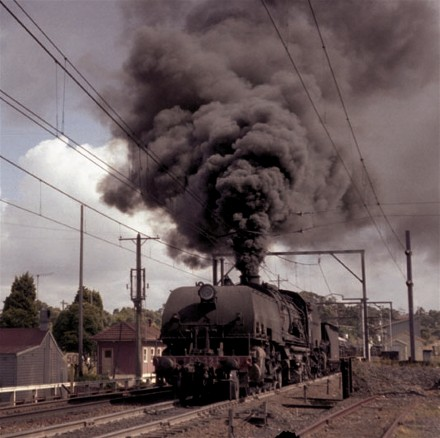
NSWGR AD60 Garratt no. 6012 tops the grade at Cowan.

The second 4-8-4+4-8-4 class were the AD60 class Garratts of the Australian 4 ft 8 1/2 in (1,435 mm) standard gauge New South Wales Government Railways, of which 47 were delivered in 1952. Of these, 42 were delivered fully assembled while the last five were delivered in pieces as spare parts. The locomotive weighed 260 imperial tons and was the largest locomotive in the Southern Hemisphere. The last of the AD60 class entered service in 1956 and the last one was withdrawn from service in 1973.

Four of the New South Wales AD60 class have been preserved.

- No. 6029 has been restored and was named City of Canberra until late 2017. It was restored to running condition in 2015.
- Numbers 6039 and 6042 are owned by the Dorrigo Steam Railway & Museum.
- No. 6040 is stored on display at NSW Rail Museum, Thirlmere.

=== Kenya and Uganda ===
The first 4-8-4+4-8-4s to be built were thirty class EC3 locomotives for the 1,000 mm (3 ft 3 3/8 in) metre gauge Kenya Uganda Railway (KUR). The thirty locomotives of the class were constructed in three batches in 1939, 1940 and 1949. These engines later became classes 57 and 58 on the East African Railways (EAR).

One of the East African Railways locomotives survives, no. 87 Karamoja of 1940, EAR no. 5711. It is on display in the Nairobi Railway Museum in Kenya.
