= W44 Concentrate Train =

The W44 Concentrate Train conveyed lead and zinc concentrates from the Zinc Corporation owned mines at Broken Hill, New South Wales to the Sulphide Corporation Cockle Creek Smelter south of Newcastle.

In August 1961, the Sulphide Corporation opened a new smelter based on the Imperial Smelting Process. The plant used high grade concentrates from the mines at Broken Hill and as they were owned by the same controlling interests these came from the Zinc Corporation and New Broken Hill Consolidated Mines.

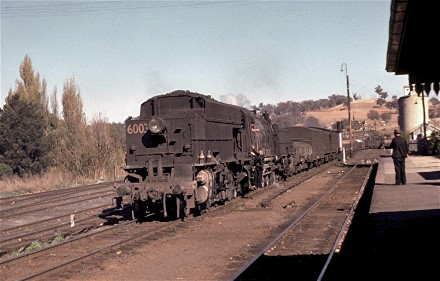
60 class locomotive 6003 at Molong

To haul the concentrates the New South Wales Government Railways modified 80 G class open wagons by permanently closing the bottom discharge doors to form the GC wagon.

These were run in block trains of 16 wagons making a load of 1,020 long tons (1,040 t). These were hauled by a single 49 class diesel locomotive from Broken Hill to Parkes, the loading being 200 tons greater than the maximum allowed for the 49 class.

At Parkes a 36 class and 60 class took over for the journey to Molong where the 36 class was replaced by another 60 class for the journey to Lithgow. A 46 class electric locomotive took the train from Lithgow to Gosford where another 60 would take over to Sulphide Junction.

Upon leaving the Main Western line and joining the Main Northern line at North Strathfield the train number changed from W44 to N645.

The rail link to the smelter was an important change in the pattern of transporting concentrates from Broken Hill as previously they had gone by sea to Cockle Creek. In the 1970s changes to the smelter allowed lower grade material to be used which was sourced from other mines and the running of W44 declined along with the scrapping of the steam locomotives. The smelter itself ceased operations in 2003.
