= BBÖ 81 =

BBÖ 81 JDŽ Class 29 DRB Class 58.7 ÖBB 58
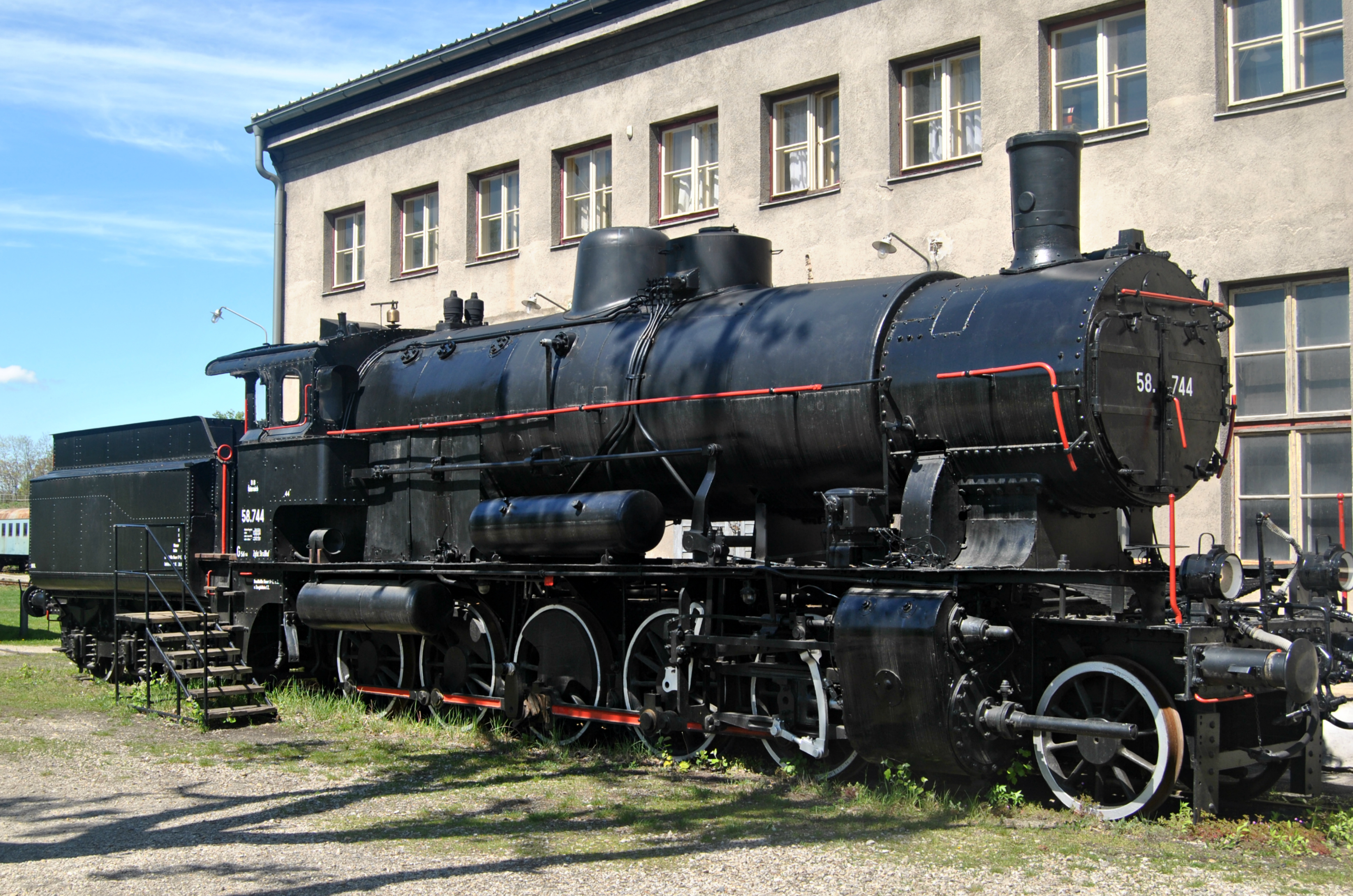
- ÖBB 58.744 (ex DRB 58 744, né BBÖ 81.44) at the Heizhaus (Strasshof Railway Museum)
Type and origin
- Power type: Steam
- Builder: Wiener Neustädter (14); Floridsdorf (40); StEG (16); Krauss (Linz) (3)
- Serial number: WN: 5557, 5750–5762; Flor.: 2800–2817, 2834–2840, 2851–2865; StEG: 4662–4667, 4686–4691, 4729–4732; Krauss: 1337–1339
- Build date: 1920–1923
- Total produced: 73
Specifications
- Configuration
  - Whyte: 2-10-0
  - UIC: 1′E h2
- Gauge: 1,435 mm (4 ft 8 1/2 in)
- Leading dia.: 1,034 mm (3 ft 4 3/4 in)
- Driver dia.: 1,298 mm (4 ft 3 1/8 in)
- Wheelbase: 14.879 m (48 ft 9 3/4 in) incl. tender
  - Engine: 8.500 m (27 ft 10 5/8 in)
- Length: 18.081 m (59 ft 3 7/8 in) over buffers
- Height: 4.650 m (15 ft 3 1/8 in)
- Adhesive weight: 71.0–72.5 tonnes (69.9–71.4 long tons; 78.3–79.9 short tons)
- Loco weight: 81.0–82.2 tonnes (79.7–80.9 long tons; 89.3–90.6 short tons)
- Tender type: BBÖ 156 class
- Fuel type: Coal
- Fuel capacity: 6.8 tonnes (6.7 long tons; 7.5 short tons)
- Water cap.: 16,000 L (3,500 imp gal; 4,200 US gal)
- Firebox
  - Grate area: 4.14 m^{2} (44.6 sq ft)
- Boiler
  - Tube plates: 4.700 m (15 ft 5 in)
- Boiler pressure: 15 kgf/cm^{2} (213 psi; 1.47 MPa)
- Heating surface
  - Firebox: 15.5 m^{2} (167 sq ft)
  - Tubes and flues: 174.0 m^{2} (1,873 sq ft)
  - Total surface: 189.5 m^{2} (2,040 sq ft)
- Superheater
  - Heating area: 50.2 m^{2} (540 sq ft)
- Cylinders: Two, outside
- Cylinder size: 590 mm × 632 mm (23 1/4 in × 24 7/8 in)
- Valve gear: Walschaerts
- Valve type: Lentz
- Loco brake: Vacuum
- Train brakes: Air
Performance figures
- Maximum speed: 55 km/h (34 mph)
- Power output: 1,540 PS (1,130 kW; 1,520 hp)
Career
- Operators: Bundesbahn Österreich; JŽ; Deutsche Reichsbahn; Österreichische Bundesbahnen
- Number in class: BBÖ: 73; JŽ: 37 (27 from BBÖ); ÖBB: 53
- Numbers: BBÖ 81.01–55, 400–415, 450–451; DR 58 701–769, 58 771–774; ÖBB 58.701–773 (with gaps)
- Retired: ÖBB: 1961

The BBÖ 81 was a class of heavy freight 2-10-0 steam locomotives with the Federal Railway of Austria (Bundesbahnen Österreichs, BBÖ).

== History ==
With the use of 20-tonne (19.7-long-ton; 22.0-short-ton) freight wagons, 1,600 tonnes (1,570 long tons; 1,760 short tons) heavy coal trains could be formed from the Moravian-Silesian coal regions. The locomotive classes 329, 429 and 170 were not powerful enough and were too slow for the task. The 380 class would have been able to do the job, but a four-cylinder compound locomotive was considered to be too expensive both to manufacture and to operate.

Johann Rihosek, Karl Gölsdorf's successor, therefore designed a two-cylinder simple superheated 2-10-0 locomotive (UIC type 1′E h2) in 1916, reusing the tried and tested boiler design of the 380 and 470 series. The 81.01, which was only delivered by the Wiener Neustädter Lokomotivfabrik in 1920 because of the First World War, had a Kobel chimney. The series locomotives were then given a "normal" chimney, higher domes to create a larger steam space, and a feedwater preheater, with several variants being tried. The last 18 units (81.4) received Lentz valve gear, Dabeg mixer-preheaters and some (four) small pipe superheaters, which increased the superheater area to 92.4 m^{2} (995 sq ft).

Since with the breakup of the Austro-Hungarian Empire the intended area of operation for the 81s was no longer in Austria, they were used in freight train service on the Western Railway, on the Gesäus route and on the Alpine routes. In some cases they even replaced the 380s in the express train service.

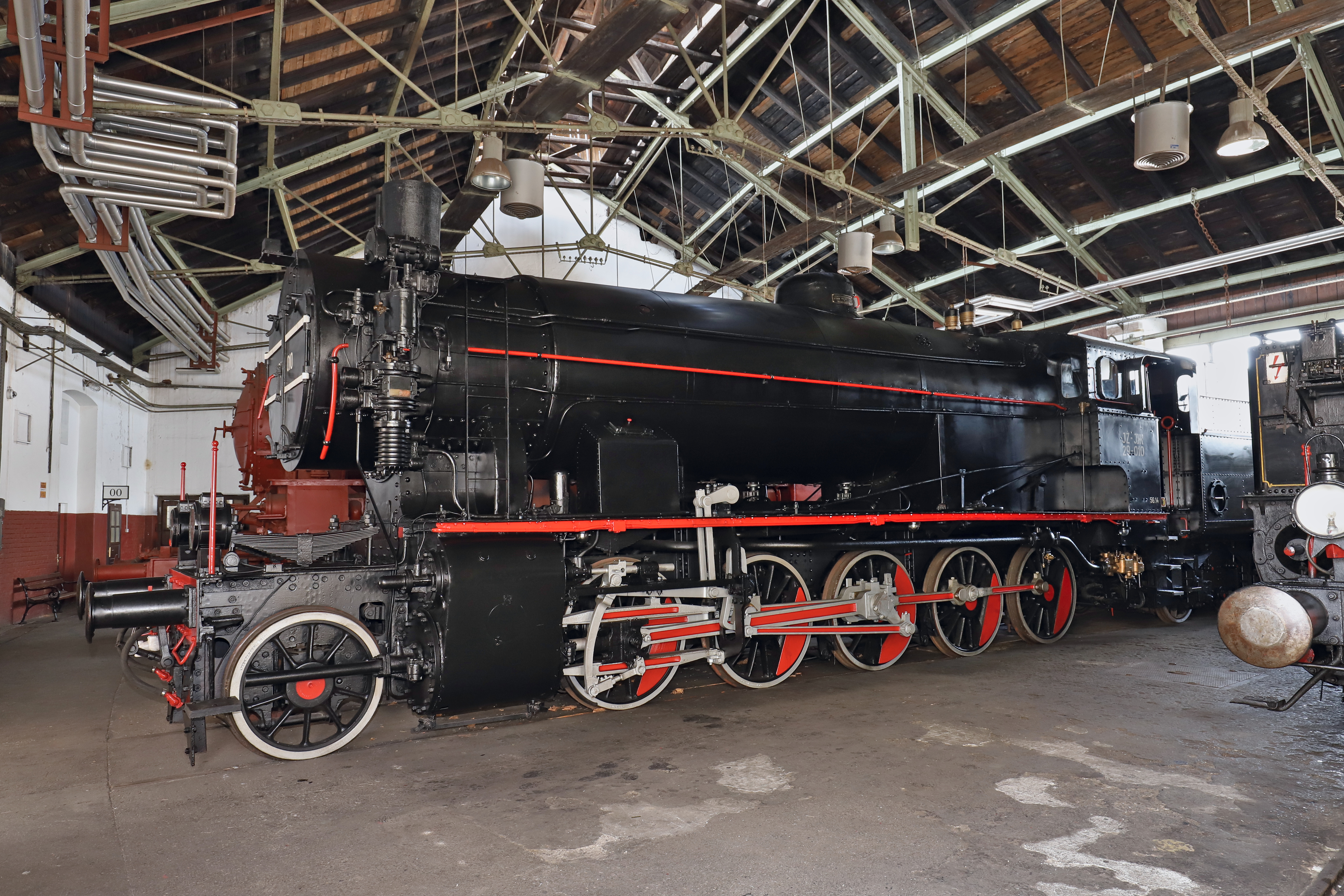
JDŽ 29-010 in the Slovenian Railway Museum, Ljubljana

The Railways of the Kingdom of Serbs, Croats and Slovenes (Železnice Kraljevine Srba, Hrvata i Slovenaca, SHS) procured ten examples of the 81 class from Wiener Neustadt in 1921 and numbered them 81.001–81.010. In 1933 these machines were renumbered 29-001 to 29-010 by the Yugoslav State Railways (JDŽ).

In 1938 all 73 examples of the BBÖ came to the Deutsche Reichsbahn, who classified them as 58 701 – 58 769 and 58 771 – 58 774. Due to their area of use during the Second World War, 17 locomotives remained with the JDŽ after the war, which they renumbered 29-011 – 29-027.

After the end of the war, the ÖBB was left with 53 locomotives in Austria, which they included in their inventory while retaining the serial and serial numbers. Since they were less powerful and slower than the DRB Class 52 kriekslok (war locomotive), they were retired by 1961.

== Preservation ==
Two examples are preserved: one, JŽ 29-010 at the Slovenian Railway Museum, Ljubljana, and the other, ÖBB 58.744, at the Heizhaus, Strasshof.
