= EAR 29 class =

Steam train

East African Railways 29 class
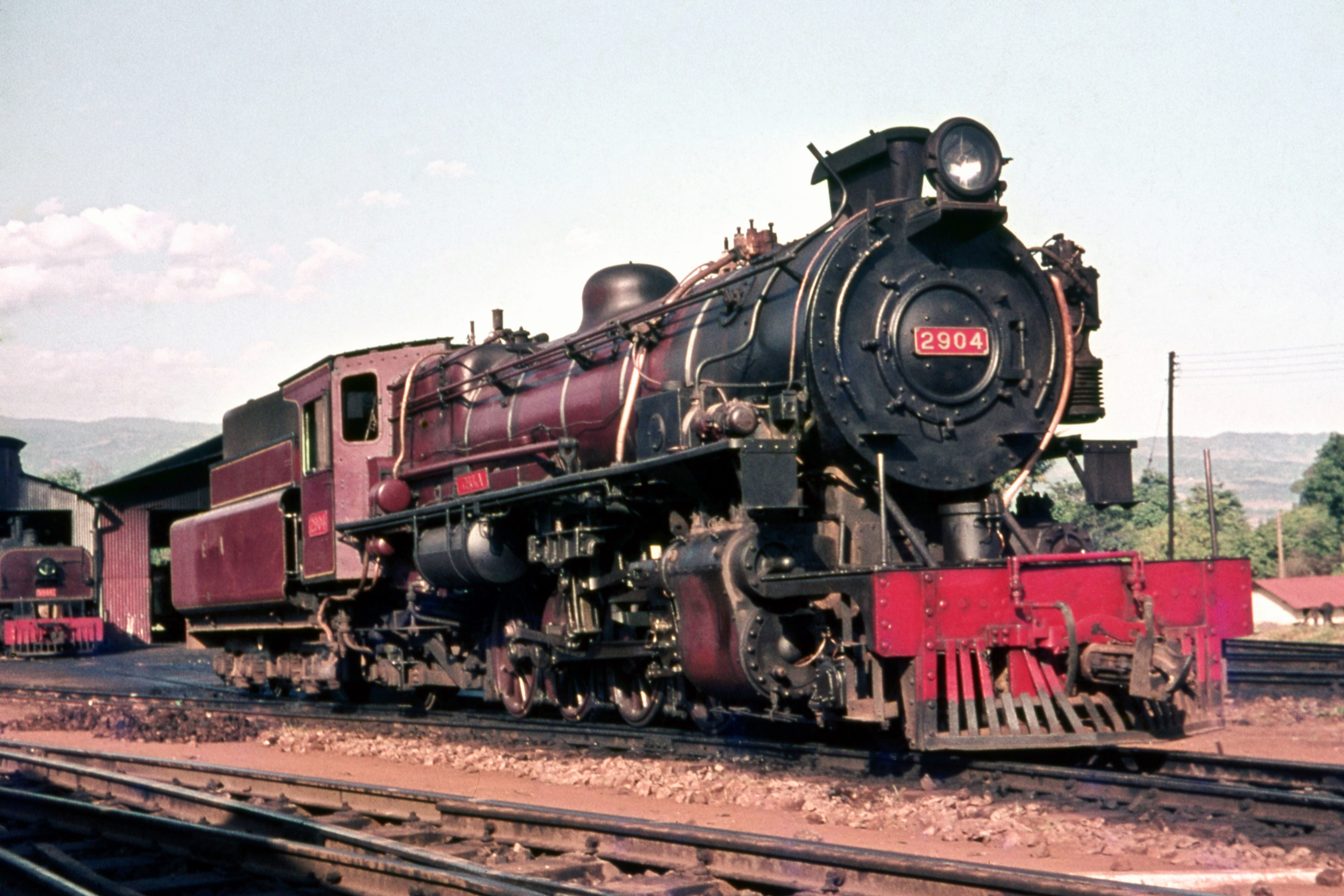
- No. 2904 at Moshi depot, Tanzania, in 1968
Type and origin
- Power type: Steam
- Builder: North British Locomotive Company
- Serial number: 26905–26920; 27085–27088; 27436–27446
- Build date: 1951-52, 1955
- Total produced: 31
Specifications
- Configuration
  - Whyte: 2-8-2
  - UIC: 1′D1' h2
- Gauge: 1,000 mm (3 ft 3 3/8 in)
- Driver dia.: 48 in (1,219 mm)
- Adhesive weight: 52 long tons (53 t)
- Loco weight: 73.8 long tons (75.0 t)
- Fuel type: Oil
- Fuel capacity: 2,056 imp gal (9,350 L; 2,469 US gal)
- Water cap.: 4,800 imp gal (22,000 L; 5,800 US gal)
- Firebox
  - Grate area: 38 sq ft (3.53 m^{2})
- Boiler pressure: 200 psi (1.38 MPa)
- Heating surface
  - Firebox: 146 sq ft (13.6 m^{2})
  - Tubes: 1,680 sq ft (156 m^{2})
  - Total surface: 2,272 sq ft (211.1 m^{2})
- Superheater
  - Type: Inside
  - Heating area: 446 sq ft (41.4 m^{2})
- Cylinders: 2
- Cylinder size: 18 in × 26 in (457 mm × 660 mm)
- Valve gear: Walschaerts
- Loco brake: Westinghouse type
- Train brakes: Westinghouse type
Performance figures
- Tractive effort: 29,835 lbf (132.71 kN)
Career
- Operators: East African Railways
- Class: 29 class
- Number in class: 31
- Numbers: 2901–2931
- Delivered: 1951–52, 1955
- First run: 1951

The EAR 29 class was a class of oil-burning 1,000 mm (3 ft 3 3/8 in) gauge 2-8-2 steam locomotives based upon the Nigerian Railways River class. Thirty-one were built for the East African Railways (EAR), in two batches, of 20 and 11, respectively, by North British Locomotive Company in Glasgow, Scotland. They were built to be gauge convertible to 1,067 mm (3 ft 6 in) gauge.

== Class list ==
The numbers, build years and names of each member of the class were as follows:

| Builders number | Built | EAR number | Name | Notes |
|---|---|---|---|---|
| 26905 | 1951 | 2901 | Boran | |
| 26906 | 1951 | 2902 | Bukusu | |
| 26907 | 1952 | 2903 | Bunyore | |
| 26908 | 1952 | 2904 | Chuka | |
| 26909 | 1952 | 2905 | Digo | |
| 26910 | 1952 | 2906 | Dorobo | |
| 26911 | 1952 | 2907 | Duruma | |
| 26912 | 1952 | 2908 | Elgeyo | |
| 26913 | 1952 | 2909 | Embu | |
| 26914 | 1952 | 2910 | Galla | |
| 26915 | 1952 | 2911 | Giryama | |
| 26916 | 1952 | 2912 | Kakamega | |
| 26917 | 1952 | 2913 | Kamasia | Later renamed Tuken (a different name for the same ethnic group) |
| 26918 | 1952 | 2914 | Kamba | |
| 26919 | 1952 | 2915 | Kikuyu | |
| 26920 | 1952 | 2916 | Kipsigis | |
| 27085 | 1952 | 2917 | Kisii | |
| 27086 | 1952 | 2918 | Luo | |
| 27087 | 1952 | 2919 | Maragoli | |
| 27088 | 1952 | 2920 | Marakwet | |
| 27436 | 1955 | 2921 | Masai of Kenya | Preserved at Nairobi Railway Museum as a static exhibit |
| 27437 | 1955 | 2922 | Meru of Kenya | |
| 27438 | 1955 | 2923 | Magodo | |
| 27439 | 1955 | 2924 | Nandi | |
| 27440 | 1955 | 2925 | Nyika | |
| 27441 | 1955 | 2926 | Samburu | |
| 27442 | 1955 | 2927 | Suk | Preserved in Dar es Salaam |
| 27443 | 1955 | 2928 | Taveta | |
| 27444 | 1955 | 2929 | Teita | |
| 27445 | 1955 | 2930 | Tiriki | |
| 27446 | 1955 | 2931 | Turkana | |

== See also ==
- History of rail transport in Tanzania
- Rail transport in Kenya
- Rail transport in Uganda
