= 4472 (disambiguation) =

4472 may refer to:

- LNER Class A3 4472 Flying Scotsman, a steam locomotive
- 4472 Navashin, a minor planet
