= 3801 =

Preserved Australian C38 class 4-6-2 locomotive

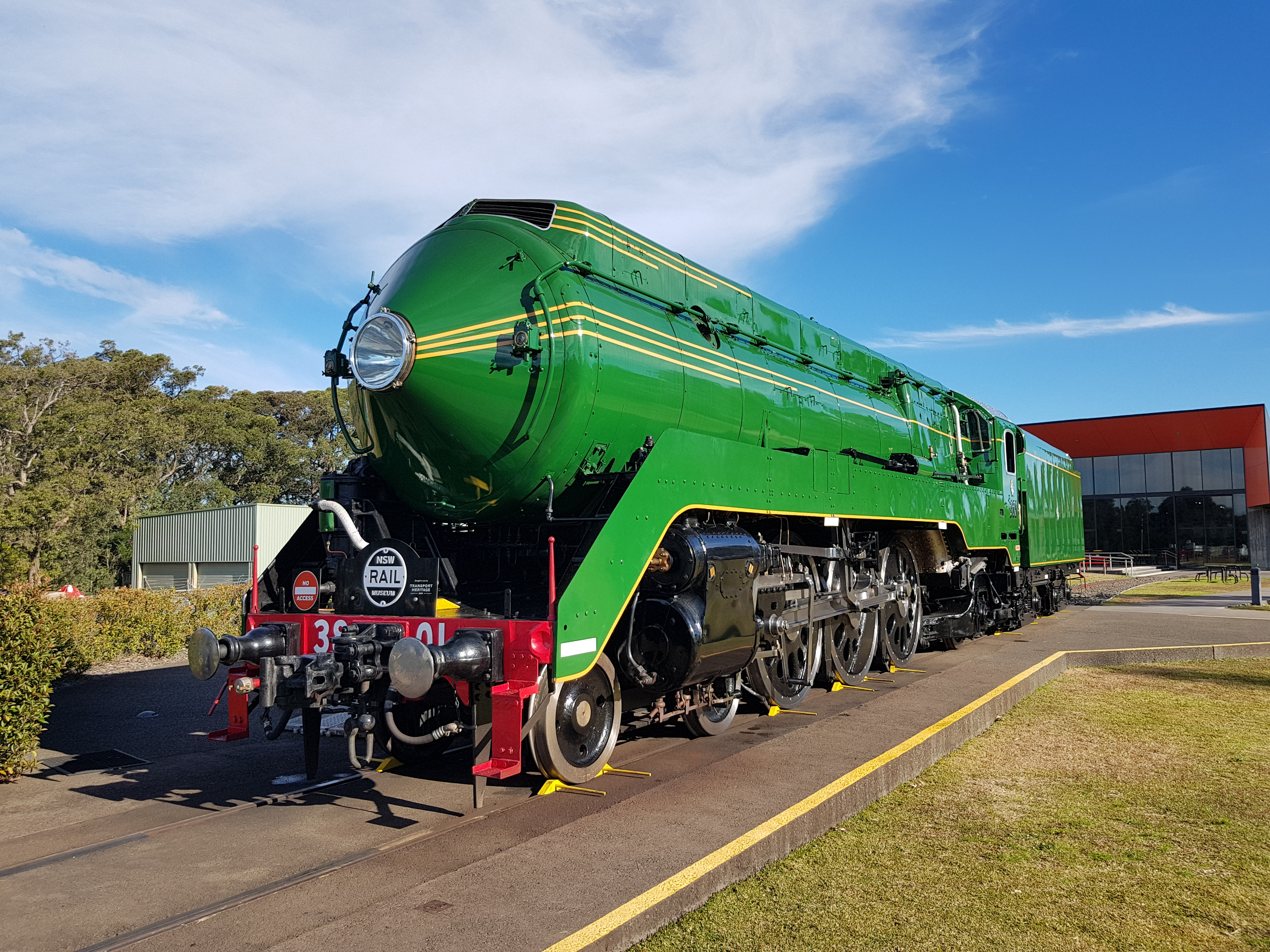
- 3801 after its restoration, August 2020
Type and origin
- Power type: Steam
- Builder: Clyde Engineering
- Serial number: 463
- Build date: 1943
Specifications
- Configuration
  - Whyte: 4-6-2
  - UIC: 2′C1′ h
- Gauge: 4 ft 8 1/2 in (1,435 mm) standard gauge
- Driver dia.: 5 ft 9 in (1,753 mm)
- Wheelbase: 65 ft 7 1/8 in (19.99 m)
- Total weight: 201 long tons (225.1 short tons; 204.2 tonnes) when in steam
- Fuel type: Coal
- Fuel capacity: 14 long tons (15.7 short tons; 14.2 tonnes)
- Water cap.: 8,100 imp gal (36,800 L; 9,730 US gal)
- Firebox
  - Grate area: 47 sq ft (4.4 m^{2})
- Boiler pressure: as built/currently: 245 lbf/in^{2} (1.69 MPa) as previously restored: 215 lbf/in^{2} (1.48 MPa); The New Boiler: 245 lbf/in^{2} (1.69 MPa)
- Heating surface
  - Tubes: 142 tubes, 2.25 in (57 mm) dia each
  - Flues: 36 flues, 5.5 in (140 mm) dia each
  - Total surface: 3,367.79 sq ft (312.878 m^{2})
- Superheater: 36 element
- Cylinders: 2 outside
- Cylinder size: 21.5 in × 26 in (546 mm × 660 mm)
Performance figures
- Maximum speed: 112 km/h (70 mph)
- Power output: 2,500 hp (1,865 kW)
- Tractive effort: as built/currently: 36,273 lbf (161.4 kN) as previously restored: 31,767 lbf (141.3 kN)
Career
- Operators: New South Wales Government Railways
- Class: 38 class
- Number in class: 1 of 30
- Nicknames: The Grey Nurse
- Locale: New South Wales, Australia
- First run: January 1943
- Withdrawn: 1974
- Disposition: Operational

3801 is a C38 class 4-6-2 steam locomotive built for and operated by the New South Wales Government Railways between 1943 and 1974. It is arguably Australia's most famous steam locomotive, being the only one to have visited all mainland states and territories.

== Construction ==
3801 was built in 1943 by Australian company Clyde Engineering as the first of 30 C38 class locomotives built to haul express trains. The first five were built by Clyde Engineering to a streamlined design, whilst the 25 post-war locomotives in the class were built by the NSWGR themselves at Eveleigh and Cardiff Locomotive Workshops and were unstreamlined.

The 38 class were first conceived in 1938. They suffered many delays during construction due to material shortages caused by World War II. 3801 was the first engine completed late 1942 and entered service on 22 January 1943 to little fanfare. It became known at the time as the Grey Nurse due to its drab, all grey colour scheme, a wartime camouflage scheme.

== In service ==
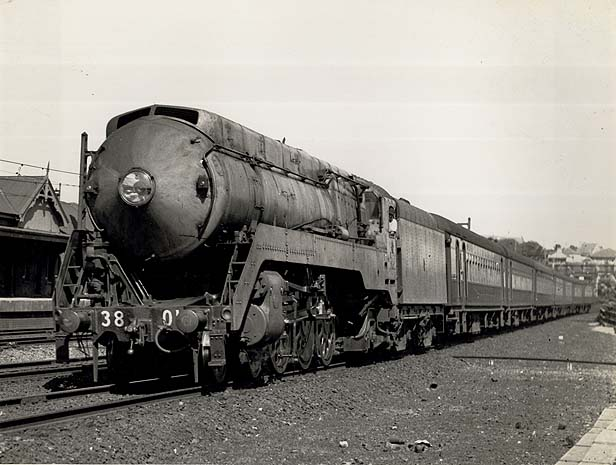
3801 passes through Stanmore in 1945

On 25 February 1943, 3801 worked the Newcastle Flyer for the first time. When joined by 3802 in April 1943, these engines were allotted to working the Melbourne Limited expresses between Sydney and Goulburn. In early 1947, 3801 was given a heavy overhaul and was painted in its standard colour scheme of green with yellow lining. A Waratah emblem was added to the top of the nose cone in later years.

In 1955, 3801 was overhauled again, being painted black with red lining as a cost-cutting measure. It was around this time that diesel locomotives started appearing on the rails of NSW. These would take the "glamour workings" away from the 38 class, the intention being to replace steam with diesel power, and to confine even modern steam to all-stations passenger and even goods trains. This intention was not realised until the end of steam on the NSWGR in 1972, as the available diesels were unable to match the speed performance of the 38s. In December 1956, 3801 was the first in its class to accrue 1 million miles (1.61 million kilometres).

In early 1963, 3801 was given a major overhaul during which it was repainted green. It was often used on special services operated by railway heritage organisations, the most famous being a non-stop run from Sydney to Newcastle on 28 June 1964. Just failing to break the two-hour barrier, this remained the fastest journey from Sydney to Newcastle by rail (2 hours 1 minute 51 seconds) until bettered by an XPT in 1988. On the return journey 3801 again fell just short of the two-hour mark.

In October 1965, the locomotive was found to have serious boiler problems, so was withdrawn and placed in the care of the New South Wales Rail Transport Museum. The museum contributed $18,000 to return 3801 to service and the boiler from 3819 was fitted. In October 1966, 3801 returned to service. However, the following year boiler problems re-emerged and the locomotive was withdrawn. Another boiler exam gave the locomotive a reprieve and allowed it to return to service. During this time, it operated a train celebrating the 25th anniversary of the Newcastle Flyer on 31 May 1969, as well as the Western Endeavour special across the continent to Perth between 22 August and 12 September 1970. In October 1972, 3801 worked to South Australia with 3642 as part of celebrations to open the Whyalla line. In April 1973 it ran to Melbourne with 3820.

In 1974, the Public Transport Commission barred all steam trains from New South Wales main lines, however during June and July of that year 3801 was allowed back to be used as the star of the award-winning film A Steam Train Passes.

== Preservation ==
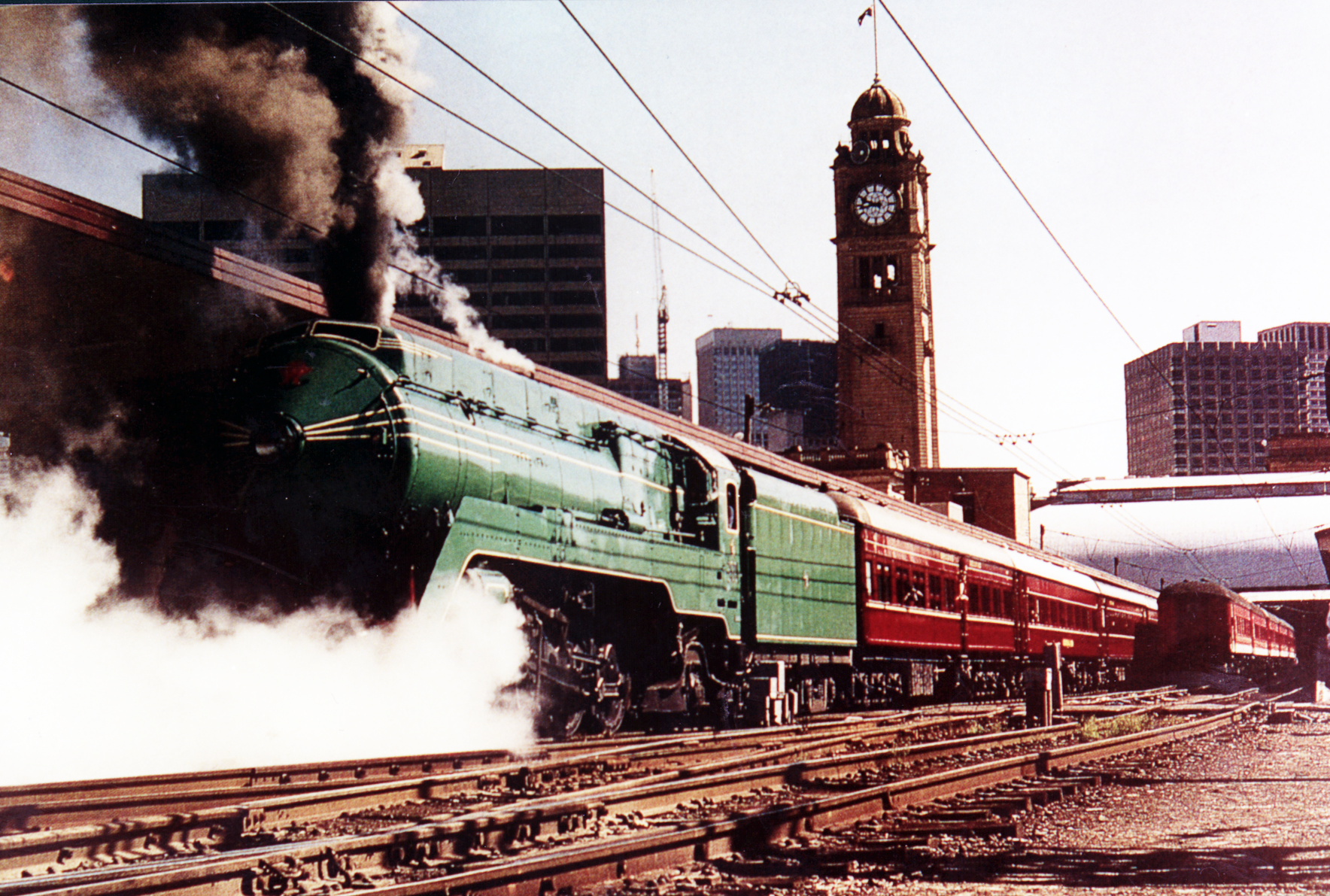
3801 at Central Station in Sydney, NSW in 1989

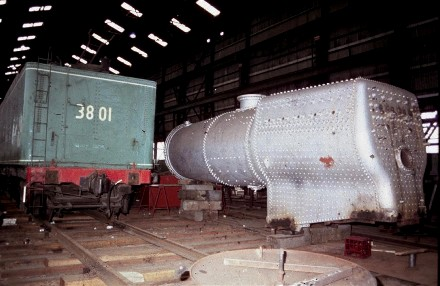
3801 under restoration at the State Dockyard

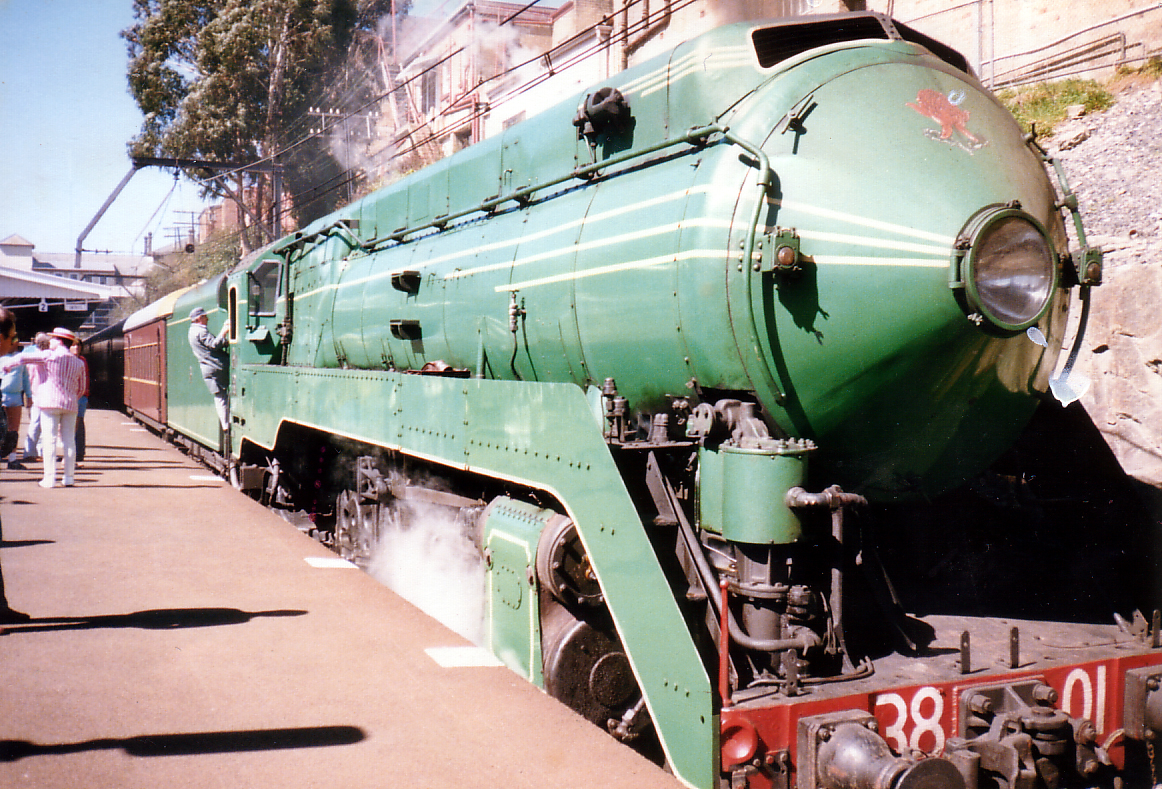
3801 at Lithgow station in January 2006

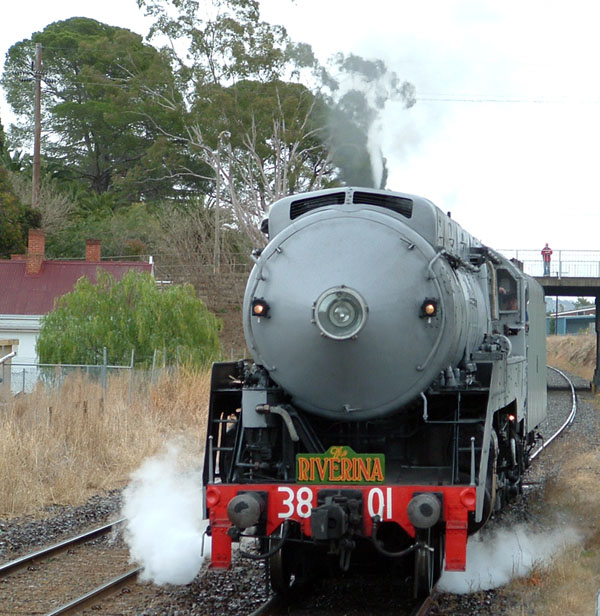
3801 at Wagga Wagga station in June 2006 with a recreation of its original Grey Nurse colour scheme

3801 returned to service on 6 January 1975, operating services on the Bankstown line to help raise money for survivors of Cyclone Tracy. After this, 3801 was deeded to the New South Wales Rail Transport Museum. In June 1975, it hauled 5711 and 1905 from Enfield Locomotive Depot to Thirlmere when the New South Wales Rail Transport Museum relocated. The engine was then used on tours until December 1976, when boiler problems led to its withdrawal.

In November 1982, chief executive of the State Rail Authority, David Hill, enquired about the suitability of restoring 3801. Hill had the 1988 Bicentenary of British settlement in Australia in mind and saw a restored 3801 as a representative of Australia's railways. The boiler was the major item needing repair and an investigation needed to be carried out to ascertain if restoration was viable. A visit was made to the South Maitland Railways (who at the time still used steam engines) to learn about modern boiler techniques. It was discovered that many advances had been made and it was possible to return boilers to service which previously would have been scrapped. The next step was to examine the boilers of the other preserved 38 class members – 3820 and 3830 (though 3813 had survived, it was completely stripped and in two different locations) – and compare them with 3801's boiler. It was decided to use the boiler already in 3801, however, the inner firebox had suffered thermal fractures and would need extensive repairs. Restoration was deemed possible, and a fund-raising appeal began.

With some finance raised and the formation of a separate company to oversee the restoration and operation (3801 Limited, now East Coast Heritage Rail), 3801 was taken to the State Dockyard in Newcastle on 20 November 1983 for restoration by the Hunter Valley Training Company – an apprenticeship scheme later involved in the restoration of 3830. This was due to the railway's workshops being stretched by regular work. It was marshalled behind 8111 on an excursion train from Sydney.

The firebox was to be completely replaced, however, the dies and jigs used to press the boiler metal had been scrapped, so the old firebox was used as a template. The new firebox had a different shape, and this reduced the boiler pressure from 245 psi to 215 psi. It was decided to weld the new firebox and some conservative engineers were sceptical as to whether this would work. Repairs and reconditioning of many other components were also carried out. The tender tank was so rusted, it needed to be replaced. The new tank was welded rather than riveted and this resulted in a sleek, plain tender. On 8 November 1986, a fire was lit for the first time. By 10 November 3801 was running around nearby sidings. More short trials followed and on 15 November 3801 was handed over and hauled a train to Maitland. More trial runs followed and on 29 November 1986, 3801 headed from Newcastle to a grand ball on the concourse of Sydney Central station.

After restoration, 3801 operated heritage trains throughout New South Wales. It was operated by 3801 Limited under a 20-year lease. During the Australian Bicentenary celebrations in 1988, it operated an extensive program across Australia visiting every mainland capital accessible by rail including another trip to Perth in April/May 1988. It also took part in events with the Flying Scotsman.

On 6 May 1990, 3801 was involved in the Cowan rail disaster. 3801 was struggling to climb the Cowan Bank (on the Sydney side of the Hawkesbury River) when returning from the Morpeth Jazz Festival when a CityRail Interurban passenger service crashed into the back of 3801's train. Six people lost their lives, including the driver of the intercity electric, and a passenger in the V set's cab. 3801 applied sand to the track to assist grip and an investigation into the crash suggested this may have caused the signals to malfunction. The signals changed from red to green several times. After the signals were green for a few moments, the interurban driver then entered the tunnel behind 3801 where the accident occurred. The handbrake in one of the carriages may also have been applied.

In 1992, 3801 visited Alice Springs for the first time, using the standard gauge track laid in 1980. The locomotive was awarded an Historic Engineering Marker plaque by Engineers Australia on 6 November 1994, the ceremony taking place at Robertson. 3801 was a regular at the Hunter Valley Steamfest.

Despite a campaign by 3801 Limited to retain custodianship of the locomotive, on 26 November 2006 the custodianship passed back to the New South Wales Rail Transport Museum. The locomotive continued to haul day trips and longer excursions until withdrawn from service for a major overhaul at the end of 2007.

== 2008–2020 overhaul ==
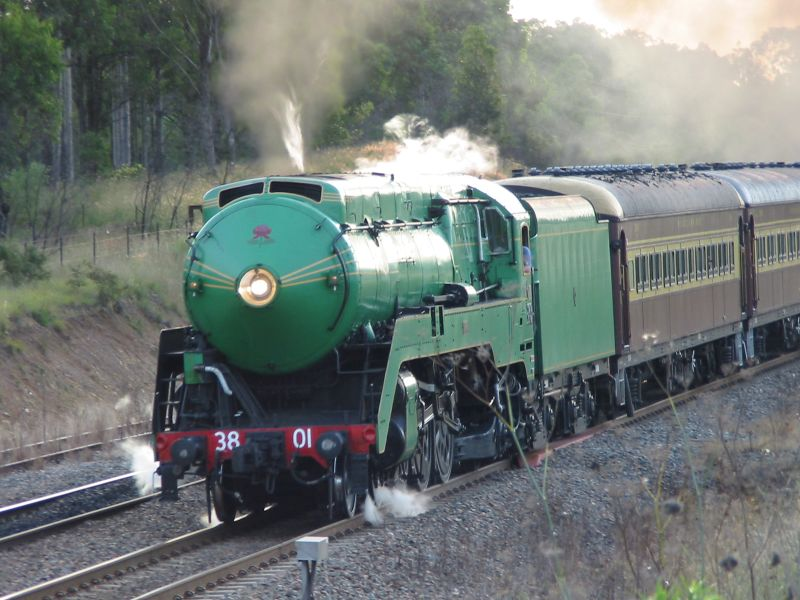
3801 passing through Branxton in 2005

When 3801 was withdrawn in 2007, it was decided to replace the original boiler with a new welded one as well as conducting various mechanical repairs. This was timetabled to be complete by the end of 2010. The contract for the construction of the new boiler was let to Dampflokwerk Meiningen in Germany, while the tender tank was transferred to the Hunter Valley Training Company at Maitland for repair.

In 2010, the new boiler arrived in Australia. Trial fitting of the boiler revealed a number of dimensional, manufacturing and technical issues which made it unsuitable for use. The boiler was subsequently returned to Germany in 2011.

The 3801 website features updates on the locomotive's progress issued by the NSW Office of Rail Heritage, with archived updates available separately.

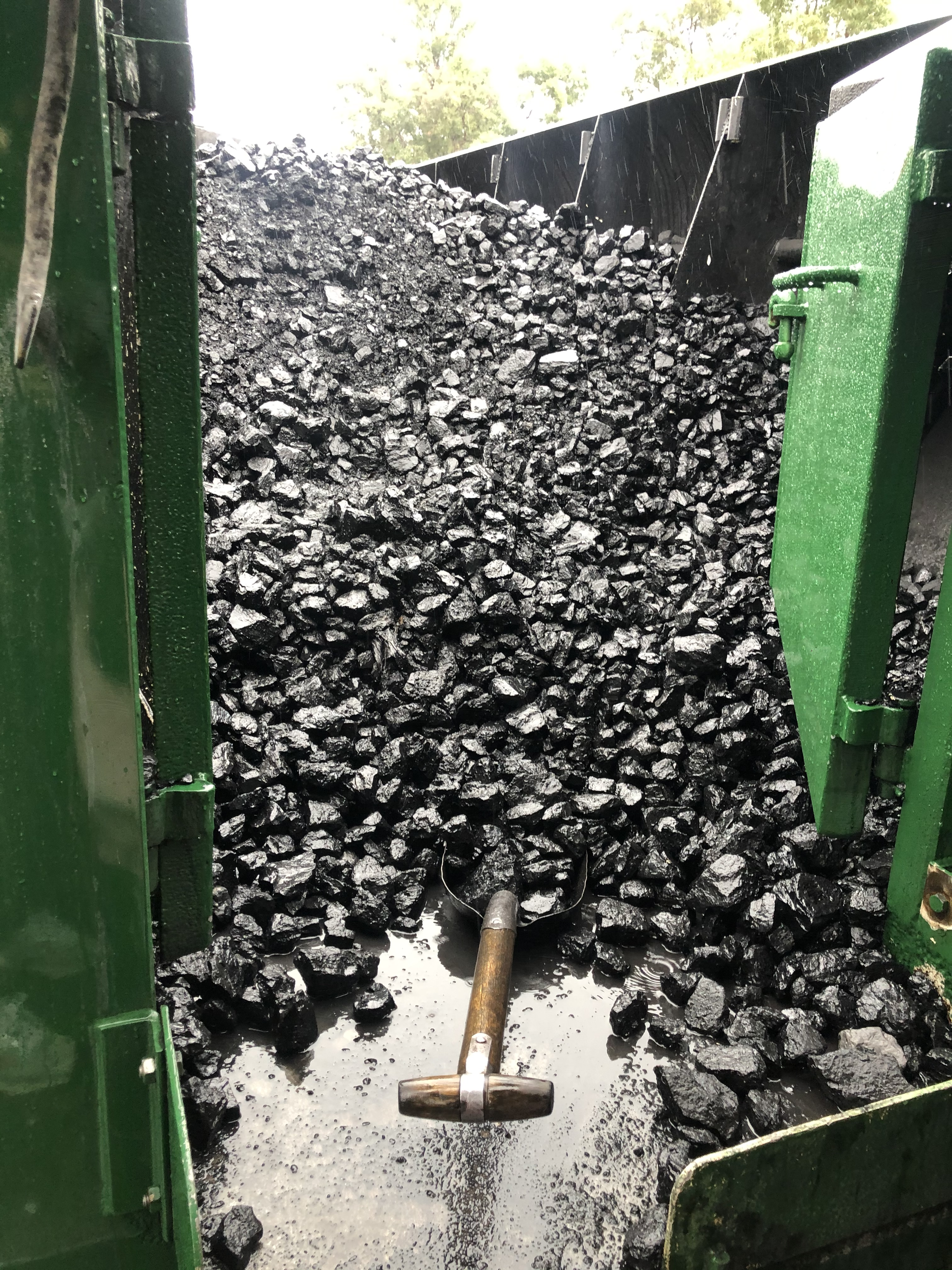
Coal in 3801's tender

In May 2013, NSW Transport Minister Gladys Berejiklian acknowledged the importance of 3801 saying it would be a priority of the new not-for-profit company Transport Heritage NSW to return 3801 to service.

In November 2014, Transport for NSW announced that the German built boiler would be brought back to Australia so that local experts can get the locomotive back on the tracks. In September 2015, Transport Heritage NSW announced that 3801 would return to service in 2017 with the old boiler to be reconditioned by the Goulburn firm Ainsworth Engineering.

In July 2019, the boiler upgrades were completed and the boiler was mounted to the frame. In September 2019, the locomotive passed its first steam test. As a result of the firebox upgrades the boiler pressure was increased to the original 245 psi.

In January 2020, the locomotive completed a couple of trials in Chullora yard. It then undertook two test runs each day from Chullora Railway Workshops to Glenfield before being transferred under its own power to the NSW Rail Museum at Thirlmere on the 25th. Trial runs on the Picton to Mittagong loop line and the Main South line from Picton to Moss Vale occurred on 5 and 6

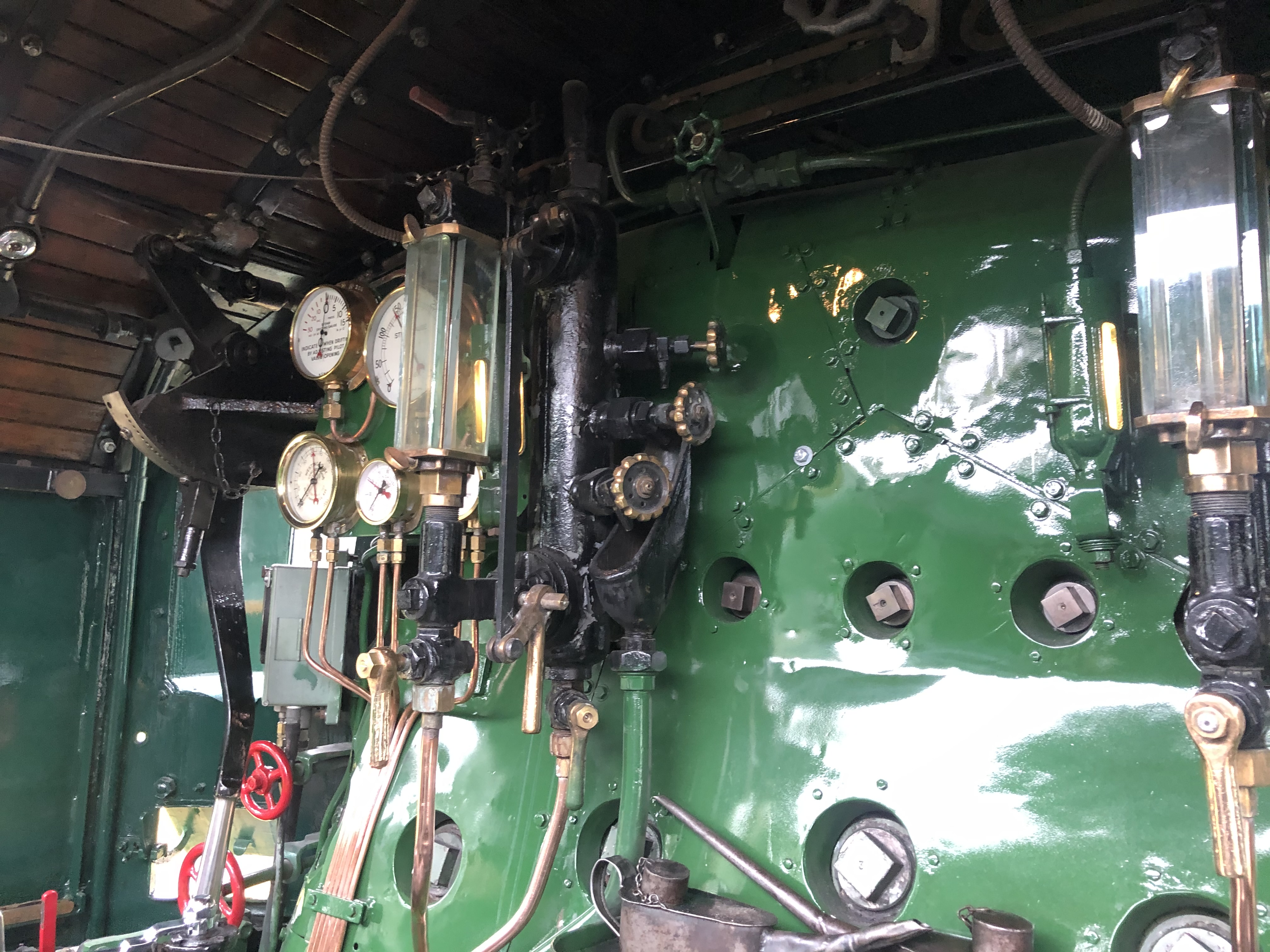
The cab of 3801

February.

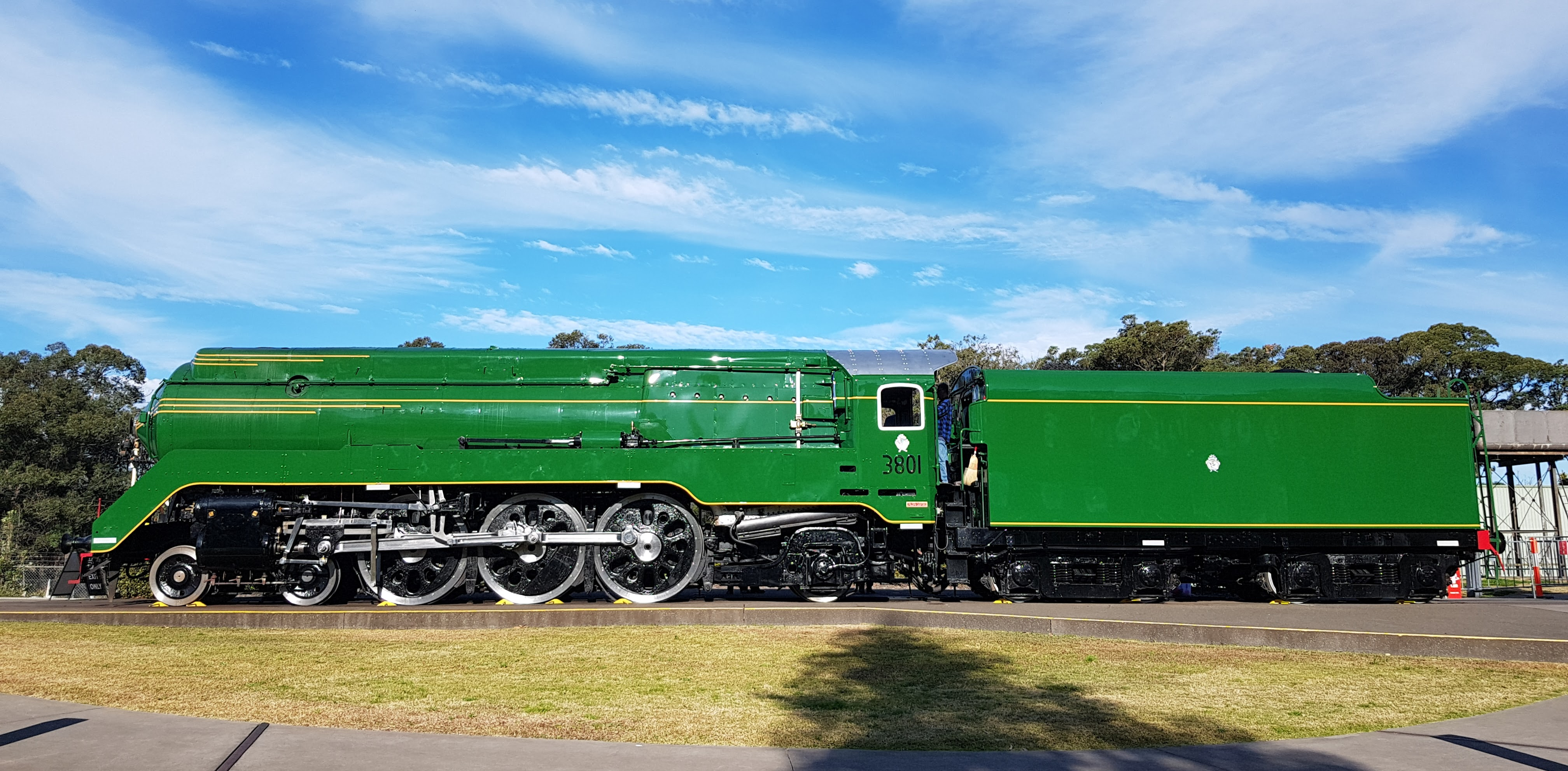
A repainted and restored 3801 in August 2020

Painting of the locomotive in lined green commenced in early March and was completed by the end of that month. The relaunch of the locomotive was planned for the 27 March with rides on that weekend leading up to the locomotive's planned presence at several other upcoming events but due to the COVID-19 pandemic the relaunch was postponed. On 15 May 2020, 3801 performed an adhesion test hauling a 318-tonne train in simulated wet weather conditions up the 1-in-40 graded Cowan Bank.

The locomotive returned to service on 13 March 2021.

== Custodianship organisations ==
It was decided during the 1983 restoration that a separate organisation needed to be formed to manage 3801 when it returned to service. In 1984, 3801 Limited was established to oversee the operation of the locomotive. The State Rail Authority, the New South Wales Rail Transport Museum and the Australian Railway Historical Society were former stakeholders. In 2005 RailCorp advised that 3801 Limited's fixed-term 20-year lease would not be renewed. The locomotive is currently in the custody of Transport Heritage NSW, the most recent evolution of the former NSW Rail Transport Museum.

== Major accomplishments and events ==
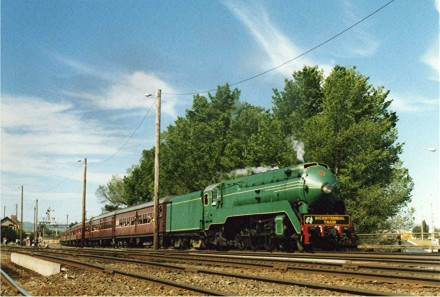
The Bicentennial Train passes through Wodonga on 16 October 1988

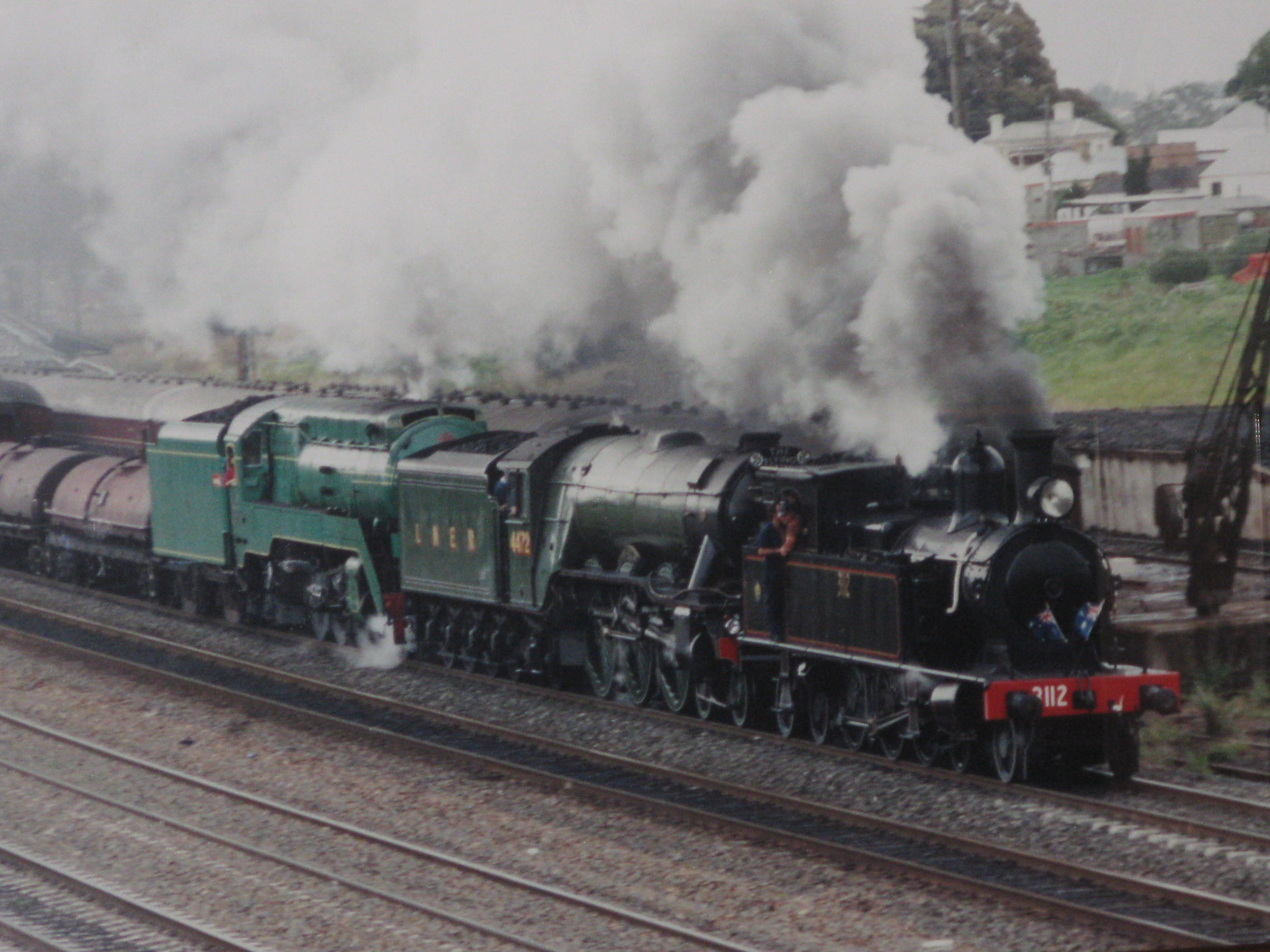
3801 with LNER Class A3 4472 Flying Scotsman and 3112 on the Queen's Birthday weekend in 1989

- First streamlined locomotive in NSW
- First 4-6-2 locomotive in NSW
- Fastest journey by rail from Sydney to Newcastle (2:01:51) (28 June 1964)
- Operated train celebrating 25th anniversary of Newcastle Flyer (31 May 1969)
- First steam locomotive to cross the Australian continent – Western Endeavour (22 August 1970 – 12 September 1970)
- Starred in film A Steam Train Passes (1974)
- A three-year restoration at the Hunter Valley Training Company commenced in 1983, back in steam in 1986
- Two songs were written about 3801, Jolly Green Giant by Johnny Ashcroft (1976) and 3801 by Ray King and Ron Russell (1987)
- Main locomotive of the "Bicentennial Train" (1988)
  - Visited Perth again (April/May 1988)
  - First standard gauge steam train to visit Adelaide (20 May 1988)
  - First standard gauge steam train to use Brisbane
  - Paralleled by 2 Victorian steam trains towards Albury at Aus Steam '88 (22 October 1988)
- Involved in many trips with Flying Scotsman – the world's best known steam locomotive (1988/89)
- Involved in Cowan rail crash claiming 6 lives (6 May 1990)
- Visited Alice Springs (1992)
- Annual race against a Tiger Moth aircraft at Hunter Valley Steamfest
- 3801 is recognised by the Heritage Council and Engineers Australia as a heritage icon
- 3801 has carried over 500,000 passengers since restoration
- A 12-year overhaul at Chullora involving a boiler rebuild commenced in 2008 and was completed in 2020
- Returned to service, 13 March 2021
- First crossing of Sydney Harbour Bridge, 25 September 2022
