= LNER Class A3 4472 Flying Scotsman =

British express steam locomotive

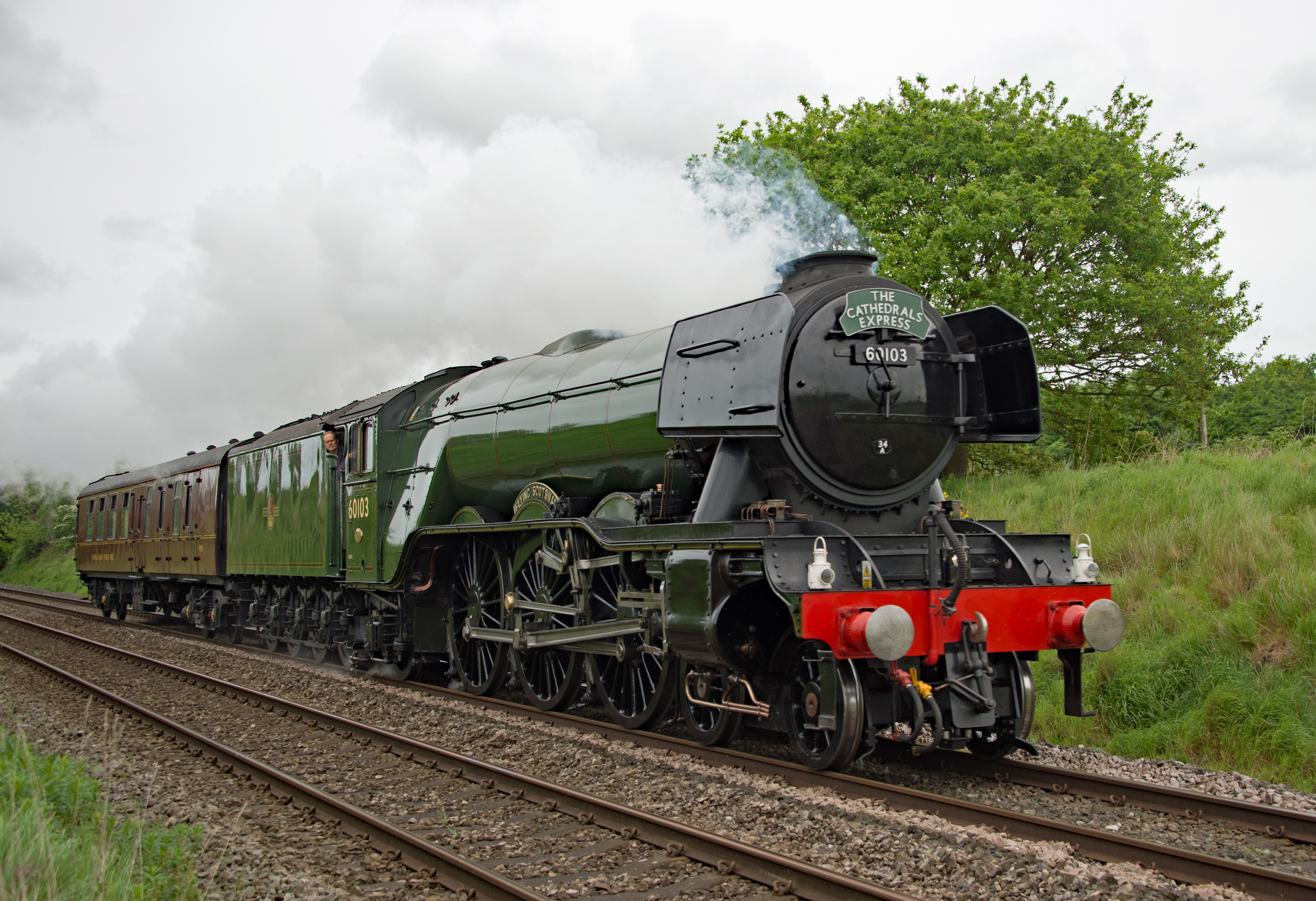
- Flying Scotsman in 2017
Type and origin
- Power type: Steam
- Designer: Sir Nigel Gresley
- Builder: Doncaster Works
- Order number: 297
- Serial number: 1564
- Build date: 1923
Specifications
- Configuration
  - Whyte: 4-6-2
- Gauge: 4 ft 8 1/2 in (1,435 mm) standard gauge
- Driver dia.: 6 ft 8 in (2,032 mm)
- Length: 70 ft (21.34 m)
- Height: 13 ft (3.96 m)
- Loco weight: 96.25 long tons (97.79 t; 107.80 short tons)
- Fuel type: Coal
- Cylinders: Three
- Valve gear: Outside: Walschaerts; Inside: Gresley conjugated
- Valve type: Piston valves
- Loco brake: Vacuum
- Train brakes: Vacuum
- Couplers: Screw
Performance figures
- Tractive effort: as built: 29,835 lbf (132.71 kN); as A3: 32,910 lbf (146.39 kN)
Career
- Operators: London and North Eastern Railway; British Railways
- Class: A3
- Numbers: LNER 1472 (to February 1924); LNER 4472 (February 1924–January 1946); LNER 103 (May 1946–December 1948); BR 60103 (December 1948–Withdrawal)
- Official name: Flying Scotsman
- First run: 24 February 1923
- Withdrawn: 15 January 1963
- Restored: 10 April 1963
- Current owner: National Railway Museum
- Disposition: Operational, mainline certified

No. 4472 Flying Scotsman is an LNER Class A3 4-6-2 "Pacific" type steam locomotive built in 1923 for the London and North Eastern Railway (LNER) at Doncaster Works to a design by Sir Nigel Gresley. It was employed on long-distance express passenger trains on the East Coast Main Line, notably on the Flying Scotsman service between London King's Cross and Edinburgh Waverley, after which it was named.

Serving as a flagship for the LNER, the locomotive represented the company twice at the British Empire Exhibition and hauled the inaugural non-stop service between the two capitals in 1928. On 30 November 1934, it became the first steam locomotive to be officially authenticated at a speed of 100 miles per hour (161 km/h). Originally built as a Class A1, the locomotive was rebuilt to improved Class A3 specifications in 1947, acquiring its distinctive double chimney and smoke deflectors later in its mainline career under British Railways, the LNER's successor.

Following its retirement from regular service in 1963 after covering 2.08 million miles (3.35 million kilometres), Flying Scotsman achieved considerable fame in preservation. It was saved from being scrapped by a succession of private owners—including Alan Pegler, William McAlpine, and Tony Marchington—and undertook extensive tours of North America (1969–1972) and Australia (1988–1989). During the Australian tour, it set a world record for the longest non-stop run by a steam locomotive at 422 miles (679 km).

After periods of financial uncertainty for its owners, Flying Scotsman was acquired by the National Railway Museum in 2004 following a high-profile public fundraising campaign. A major decade-long restoration was completed in 2016, after which the locomotive returned to operation on heritage railways and the national mainline, celebrating its centenary in 2023. It is widely described by historians and the media as the world's most famous steam locomotive.

== History ==
=== LNER ===
In July 1922, the Great Northern Railway (GNR) filed Engine Order No. 297 which gave the green-light for ten Class A1 4-6-2 "Pacific" locomotives to be built at Doncaster Works. Designed by Nigel Gresley, the A1s were built to haul mainline and later express passenger trains and following the GNR's absorption into the LNER after the amalgamation of 1923, became a standard design. Flying Scotsman cost £7,944 to build, and was the first engine delivered to the newly-formed LNER. It entered service on 24 February 1923, carrying the GNR number of 1472 as the LNER had not yet decided on a system-wide numbering scheme. In February 1924 the locomotive received its name after the LNER's Flying Scotsman express service between London King's Cross and Edinburgh Waverley, and was assigned a new number, 4472.

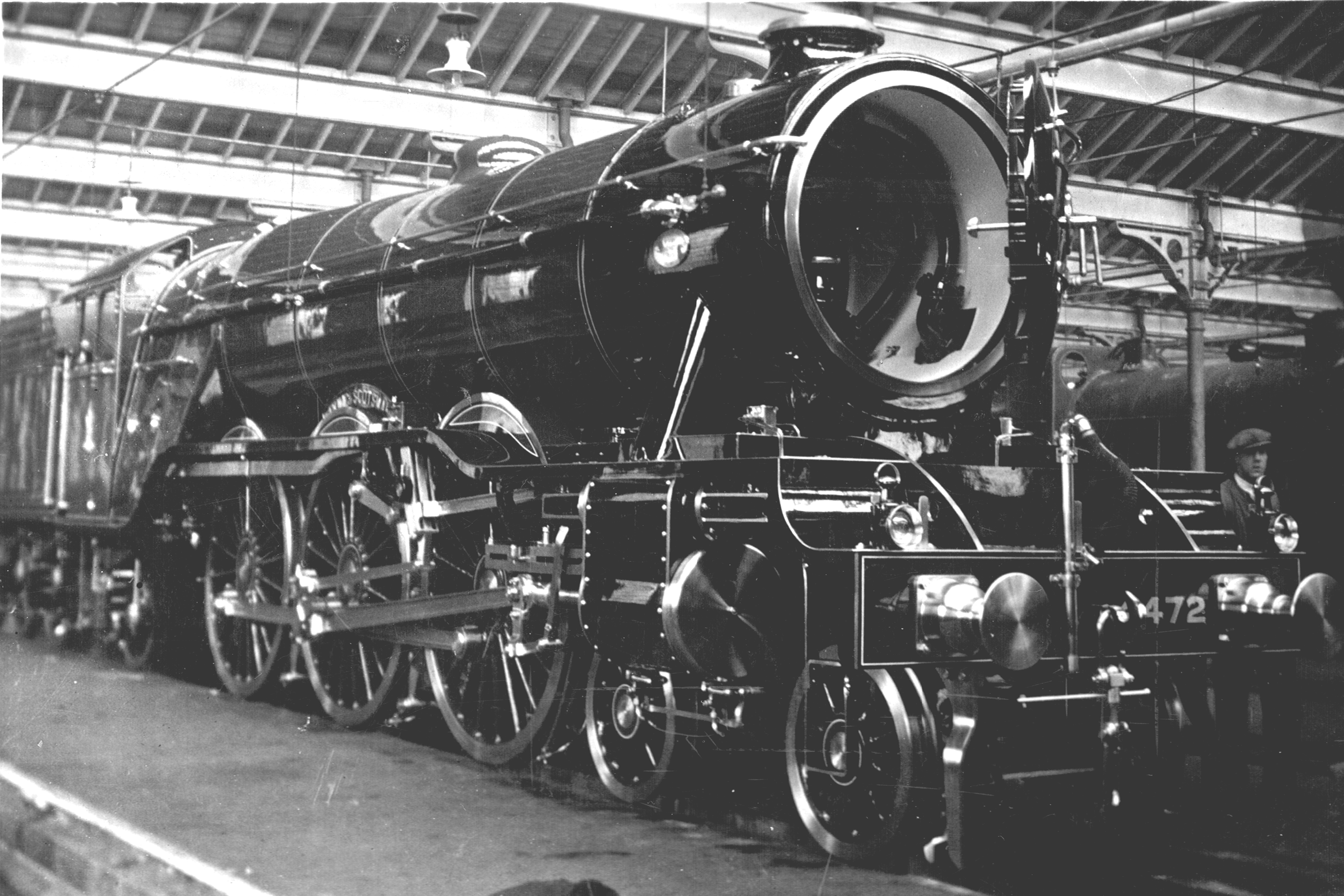
Flying Scotsman being prepared for the 1924 British Empire Exhibition

Flying Scotsman became a flagship locomotive for the LNER, representing the company at the British Empire Exhibition at Wembley Park in 1924 and 1925, and was frequently used in promotional materials. In 1928, the LNER decided to make The Flying Scotsman a non-stop service for the first time and 4472 was one of five A1s selected for the service. It hauled the inaugural train on 1 May, completing the journey of 392 miles (631 km) in 8 hours and 3 minutes. The non-stop runs were achieved with an upgraded tender which held an extra long ton of coal and fitted with a corridor connection, so a change of driver and fireman could take place while the train was moving. Water was replenished from water troughs several times en route. Flying Scotsman ran with its corridor tender until October 1936, after which it reverted to the original type. From 1938 until its withdrawal in 1963, it was paired with a streamlined non-corridor tender.

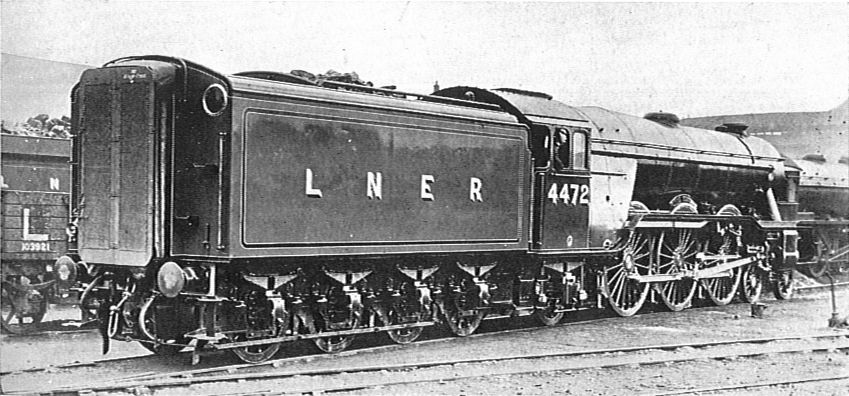
Flying Scotsman in 1928, with its corridor tender

On 30 November 1934, Flying Scotsman became the first steam locomotive to reach the officially authenticated speed of 100 mph (161 km/h), while hauling a light test train between Leeds and London, and the publicity-conscious LNER made much of the fact. Although the Great Western Railway's 3440 City of Truro was reported to have reached the same speed in 1904, the record was unofficial.

Following the success of Gresley's streamlined Class A4s introduced in 1935, Flying Scotsman was relegated to lesser duties but still worked on the main line and hauling passenger services. In 1943, as with all railway stock during World War II, the locomotive was painted black. In 1946, it was renumbered twice by Gresley's successor Edward Thompson, who devised a comprehensive renumbering scheme for the LNER. 4472 was initially assigned number 502, but an amendment to the system several months later led to its renumbering of 103.

In 1928, Gresley began to modify the A1s into an improved version, the Class A3, on a gradual basis. In 1945, the remaining unmodified A1s, which included Flying Scotsman, were reclassified as A10. In late 1946, no. 103 was rebuilt as an A3, returning to traffic on 4 January 1947 with its original Apple Green livery. The rebuilding involved the replacement of its old round-dome 180 psi boiler (Diagram 94) with a 225 psi version (Diagram 94A) with the long "banjo" dome of the type it carries today, and it was fitted with more efficient valves and cylinders.

=== British Railways ===
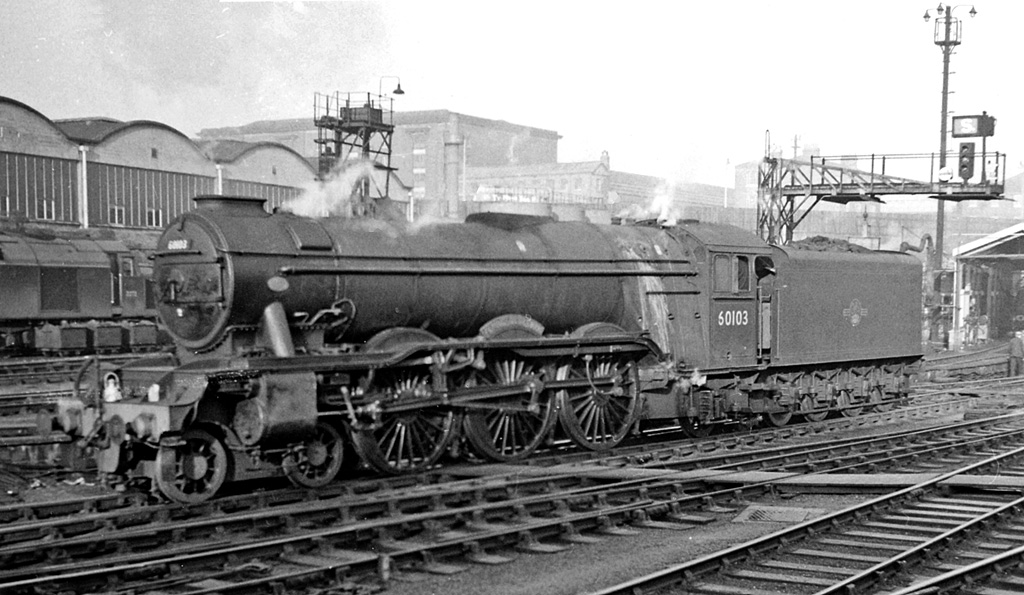
Flying Scotsman, now numbered 60103, under BR ownership in December 1960

Following the nationalisation of Britain's railways on 1 January 1948, Flying Scotsman was renumbered E103 for several months, before almost all of the LNER locomotive numbers were increased by 60000, and became 60103 that December. Between 1949 and 1952 it wore a BR Express Blue livery, after which it was painted in BR Green. On 4 June 1950, now under British Railways ownership, Flying Scotsman was allocated to its new base at Leicester Central on the Great Central Main Line, running passenger services to and from London Marylebone, London St Pancras, Leicester, Sheffield, and Manchester.

60103 returned to the East Coast Main Line in 1953, initially based in Grantham, before returning to London King's Cross in the following year. In December 1958, the locomotive was fitted with a double Kylchap chimney to improve performance and economy, but it caused soft exhaust and smoke drift that tended to obscure the driver's forward vision. The remedy was found in the German-type smoke deflectors fitted at the end of 1961.

Amid rumours that British Railways would sell Flying Scotsman for scrap, the Gresley A3 Preservation Society failed to raise the £3,000 to buy it. Businessman and railway enthusiast Alan Pegler stepped in, having seen the locomotive as a boy at the British Empire Exhibition and received £70,000 in 1961 for his shareholding in the Northern Rubber Company when it was sold to Pegler's Valves, a company started by his grandfather. Pegler bought the locomotive for £3,500 (equal to £63,928 today) with the political support of Prime Minister Harold Wilson. On 14 January 1963 Jack Peckston of Copley Hill drove Flying Scotsman for its final service with British Railways, hauling the 13:15 from London King's Cross to Leeds with the locomotive coming off at Doncaster. The event attracted considerable media interest. Flying Scotsman had covered over 2.08 million miles in three weeks short of 40 years in operation.

== Preservation ==
=== Alan Pegler (1963–1972) ===
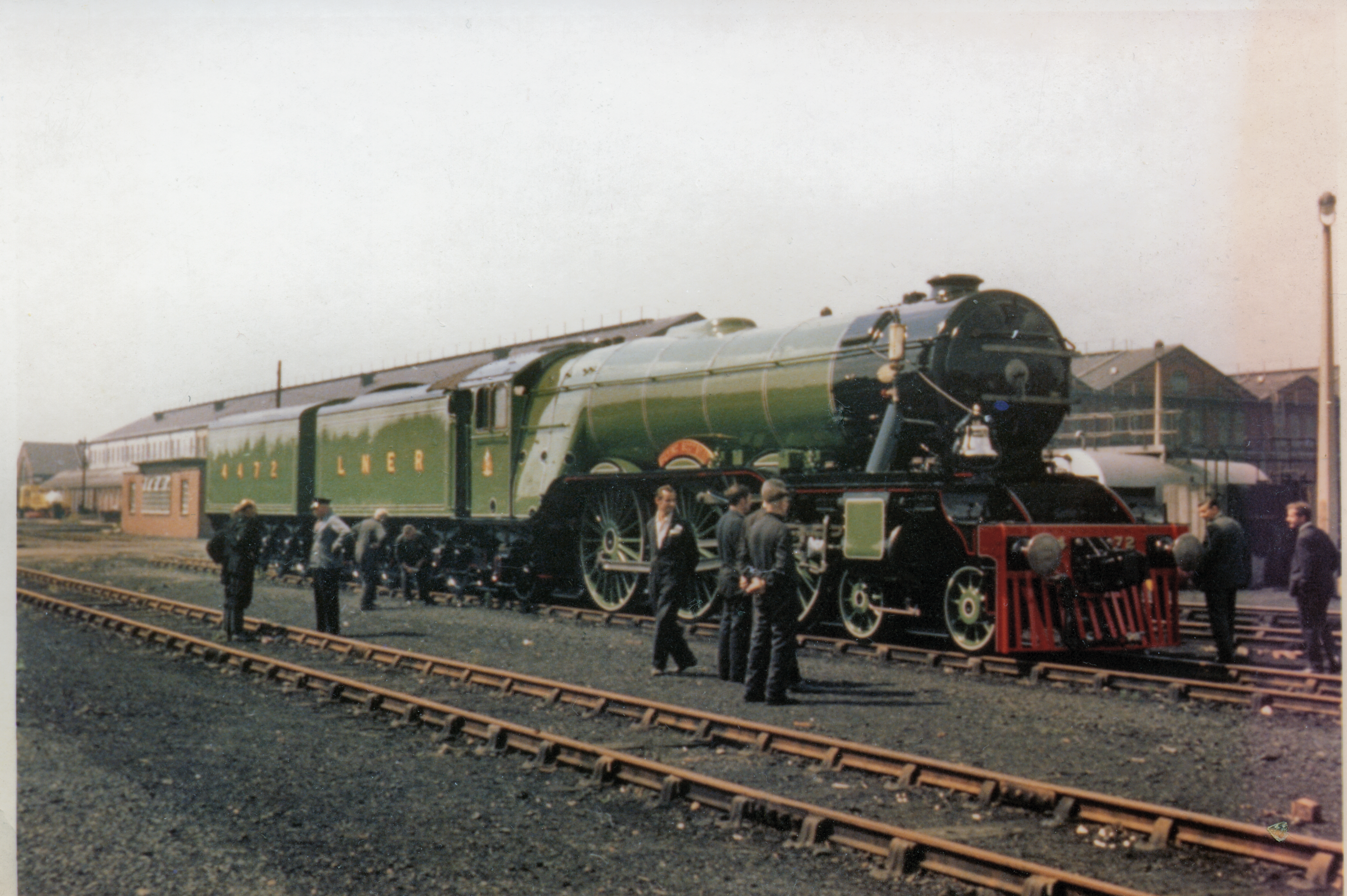
Flying Scotsman ready for its US tour in 1969

Pegler immediately restored Flying Scotsman at Doncaster Works as closely as possible to its LNER condition: it was renumbered 4472 and repainted in LNER Apple Green; the smoke deflectors were removed; the double chimney replaced by a single; and its standard tender was replaced with a corridor type. Pegler's contract with British Railways allowed him to run Flying Scotsman on the network until 31 December 1971; for a time, it was the only steam locomotive running on the British mainline. Its first public run was on 10 April 1963 with a round trip from London Paddington to Ruabon, Wales, where over 8,000 people came out to see the locomotive at Birmingham. In the following year, Pegler had the engine stand on the Forth Bridge for several days while it was sketched for a portrait by Terence Cuneo. On 13 November 1965, Flying Scotsman claimed the fastest steam hauled run between Paddington and Cardiff at 2 hours and 17 minutes, and set the fastest run for the return leg. By the end of 1965, Flying Scotsman had recouped the £3,000 it cost Pegler to buy it.

As watering facilities for steam locomotives were disappearing, in September 1966 Pegler spent £1,000 on a second corridor tender which, for an additional £6,000, was adapted as an auxiliary water tank and coupled behind the first tender. With a total water capacity of around 11,000 gallons, this gave Flying Scotsman an operational range of over 200 miles. The boiler and cylinder parts from Flying Scotsman's scrapped sister engine, 60041 Salmon Trout were also purchased. On 1 May 1968, the locomotive completed a non-stop London to Edinburgh run, marking the 40th anniversary of the inaugural non-stop Flying Scotsman service and the year steam traction officially ended on British Railways. A non-stop return journey was made three days later.

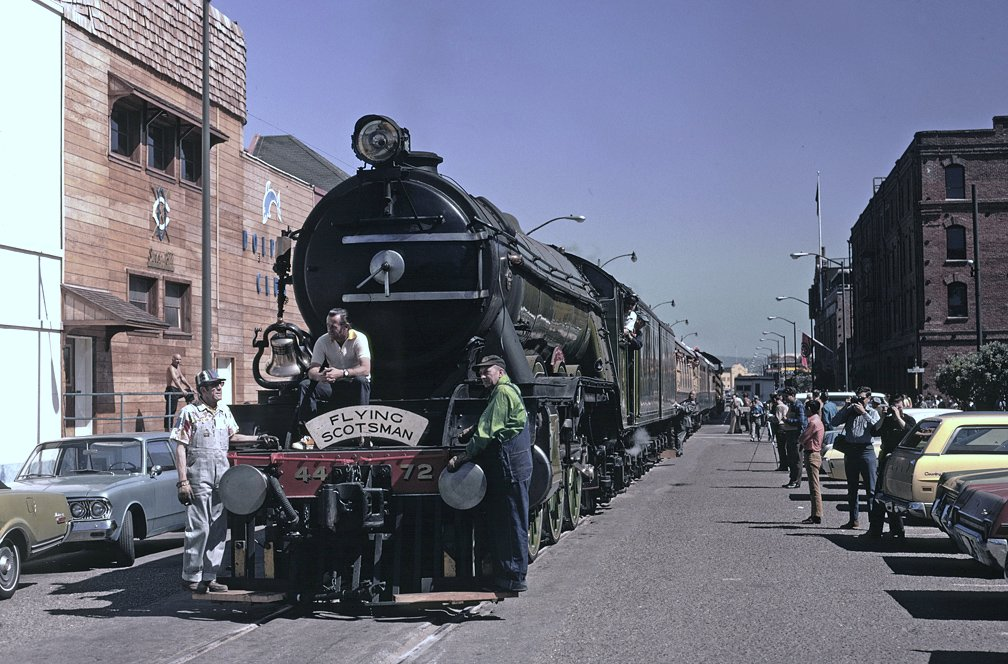
Flying Scotsman at Fisherman's Wharf, San Francisco, March 1972

Following an overhaul on the locomotive in the winter of 1968–69, Wilson's government agreed to support Pegler running Flying Scotsman in the United States and Canada, hauling a 9-coach exhibition train to promote British exports. To comply with local railway regulations, it was fitted with a cowcatcher, bell, buckeye couplers, American-style whistle, air brakes, and high-intensity headlamp. The first leg began in October 1969 with a run from Boston, Massachusetts to Atlanta, Georgia via New York City and Washington, D.C., and on to Slaton, Texas, where it paused for the winter. Despite a successful start, the tour ran into problems as strict anti-steam laws in some states deemed the engine a fire hazard, and either denied permission to run or required the train to be towed by a diesel or electric locomotive. Restrictions on foreign trains meant Pegler was not allowed to carry paying passengers, and had to pay local railways to run on their lines. The tour resumed in 1970 with a run from Texas to Green Bay, Wisconsin and across the Canadian border into Montreal; this was followed by a run from Toronto to San Francisco via the Rocky Mountains and Oregon in 1971, a total of 15,400 miles (24,800 km).

In 1972, Flying Scotsman earned money running passenger trips on the San Francisco Belt Railroad and was put on show at Fisherman's Wharf. Despite a hopeful start, complaints from businesses along the route ended the trips, and the train had to relocate to a less accessible yard, causing a 90% reduction of income. Pegler, now £132,000 in debt with considerable unpaid bills, declared himself bankrupt and in August, arranged for the engine to be kept in storage at the US Army's Sharpe Depot in Lathrop, California to keep it from unpaid creditors, who by now were demanding payments and threatening legal action. Pegler worked his passage home on a P&O cruise ship, which led to a seven-year career as a cruise entertainer giving lectures about trains and travel and enabled him to discharge himself from bankruptcy.

=== William McAlpine (1973–1995) ===
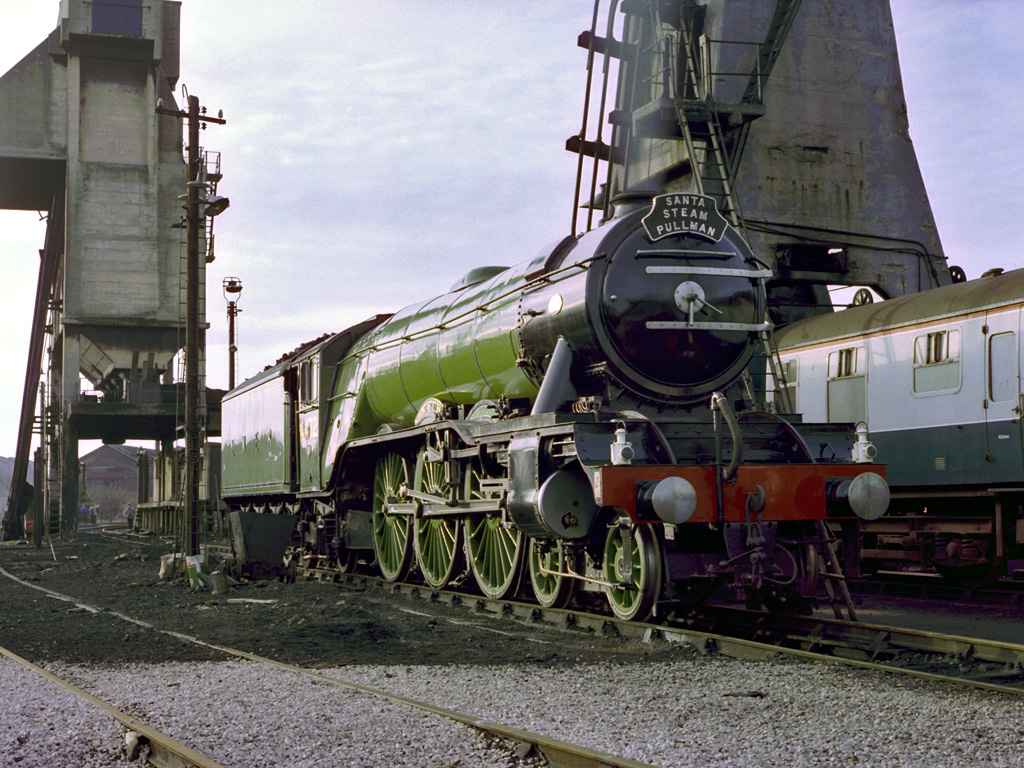
Flying Scotsman at Carnforth MPD in 1982 with original single chimney and without the smoke deflectors

Amid fears of the engine's future, horticulturist and steam enthusiast Alan Bloom asked businessman William McAlpine to help save it. McAlpine agreed and within a few days dealt with the attorneys, paid the outstanding debts owed to the local American and Canadian railways, and bought the locomotive for $72,000 (around £25,000). Flying Scotsman was shipped back to England via the Panama Canal, which cost McAlpine another $35,000. Upon arrival at Liverpool in February 1973, the engine travelled to Derby under its own steam with the route lined with crowds. McAlpine paid for its restoration at Derby Works and two subsequent overhauls in the 23 years that he owned and ran it.

Following runs on the Paignton and Dartmouth Steam Railway in the summer of 1973, it was transferred to Steamtown in Carnforth, from where it steamed on regular tours. In December 1977, Flying Scotsman entered the Vickers Engineering Works in Barrow-in-Furness for heavy repairs, including installation of an unused replacement boiler. In 1984, it became the first preserved steam locomotive to haul the Royal Train on the British mainline, taking The Queen Mother to the official opening of the North Woolwich Old Station Museum. In 1986, McAlpine leased a former diesel locomotive maintenance shop at Southall Railway Centre in London, which became the new base for Flying Scotsman until 2004.

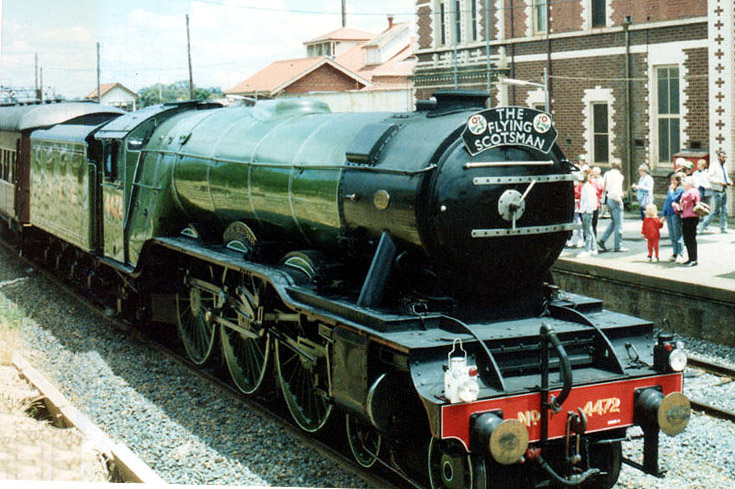
Flying Scotsman at Seymour railway station, Australia in 1989 equipped with electric lighting and air brakes for operation on Australian railways

In October 1988, Flying Scotsman arrived in Australia for the country's bicentenary celebrations as part of the Aus Steam '88 festival. Flying Scotsman covered over 45,000 kilometres (28,000 mi) during its time in Australia. Flying Scotsman would arrive at Sydney and travel to Melbourne for Aus Steam '88. After the celebrations, Flying Scotsman would continue tours in New South Wales, with a tour to Brisbane following it. The longest part of the tour was the journey from Sydney to Perth via Alice Springs as the first locomotive to travel on the newly built standard gauge line to Alice Springs. As well as being the first steam locomotive to officially reach 100mph, Flying Scotsman achieved a second world record during its tour: it completed the longest non-stop run by a steam locomotive, covering 679 kilometres (422 miles) between Parkes and Broken Hill in New South Wales.

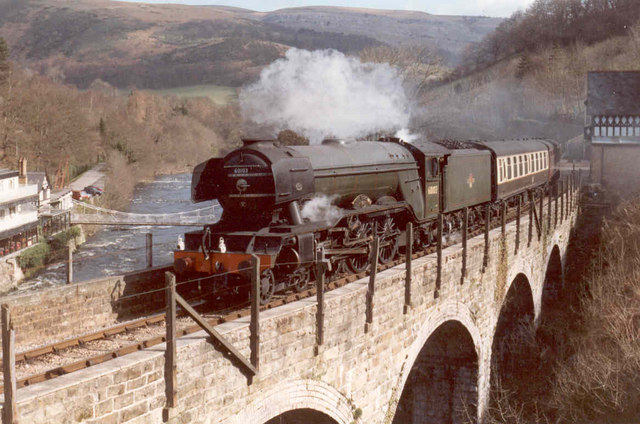
Flying Scotsman in 1994, wearing its British Railways livery and numbering, equipped with double chimney and smoke deflectors

Other highlights included Flying Scotsman double-heading with New South Wales Government Railways Pacific locomotive 3801, a triple-parallel run alongside broad gauge Victorian Railways R class locomotives, and parallel runs alongside South Australian Railways locomotives 520 and 621. Its visit to Perth saw a reunion with GWR 4079 Pendennis Castle, which had been exhibited alongside Flying Scotsman at the 1924 British Empire Exhibition. On 8 August 1989, after achieving its second world record, Flying Scotsman set its own haulage record when it took a 735-ton train over the 790-kilometre (490 mi) distance between Tarcoola and Alice Springs.

Upon returning to Britain, Flying Scotsman returned to its former British Railways condition with its number changed to 60103, refitting of the smoke deflectors and double chimney, and repainted in BR Green. It retired from the mainline in 1992 following the expiration of its running certificate. In 1993, McAlpine sold it to help pay off a mortgage on the locomotive. Music producer and railway enthusiast Pete Waterman became involved and the two formed Flying Scotsman Railways, with Waterman running the business side of the partnership.

In April 1995, Flying Scotsman derailed during an empty stock movement on the Llangollen Railway, with all wheels coming off the track. When put back into steam, smoke emerged from a crack separating the boiler and the cab front. It was deemed a total failure and immediately withdrawn from service. It returned to Southall awaiting its next major overhaul.

=== Tony Marchington (1996–2004) ===
By 1996, McAlpine and Waterman had run into financial issues and, to help pay off an overdraft, put Flying Scotsman on sale. On 23 February, entrepreneur Tony Marchington, already well known in the steam preservation movement, bought the locomotive, a set of Pullman coaches, and the Southall depot for £1.5 million. He spent a further £1 million on the locomotive's subsequent overhaul to mainline running condition, which lasted three years and at that point, the most extensive in its history. It received an upgraded 250 psi boiler originally made for a Class A4; its vacuum brakes replaced with an air type; its livery repainted in LNER Apple Green; the smoke deflectors removed; the double chimney restored; and renumbered 4472. Marchington's time with Flying Scotsman was the subject of the 2000 Channel 4 documentary A Steamy Affair: The Story of Flying Scotsman.

Flying Scotsman's first run following the works was on 4 July 1999, hauling The Inaugural Scotsman from London King's Cross to York, where an estimated one million people turned out to see it. It was the locomotive's first visit to King's Cross in 30 years. In addition to working mainline specials 4472 also hauled several Venice-Simplon Orient Express Pullman trains between 2001 and 2004, but financial issues quickly became apparent and Flying Scotsman Services failed to effectively market or price the runs, in addition to the locomotive failing several times.

In 2002, Marchington proposed a business plan which included the construction of a Flying Scotsman Village in Edinburgh, to create revenue from associated branding. After floating on OFEX as Flying Scotsman plc in the same year, in 2003 Edinburgh City Council turned down the village plans, and in September 2003 Marchington was declared bankrupt. Flying Scotsman plc CEO Peter Butler announced losses of £474,619, and with a £1.5 million overdraft at Barclays Bank, stated that the company only had enough cash to trade until April 2004. Later the company's shares were suspended after it had failed to declare interim results.

=== National Railway Museum (2004–present) ===
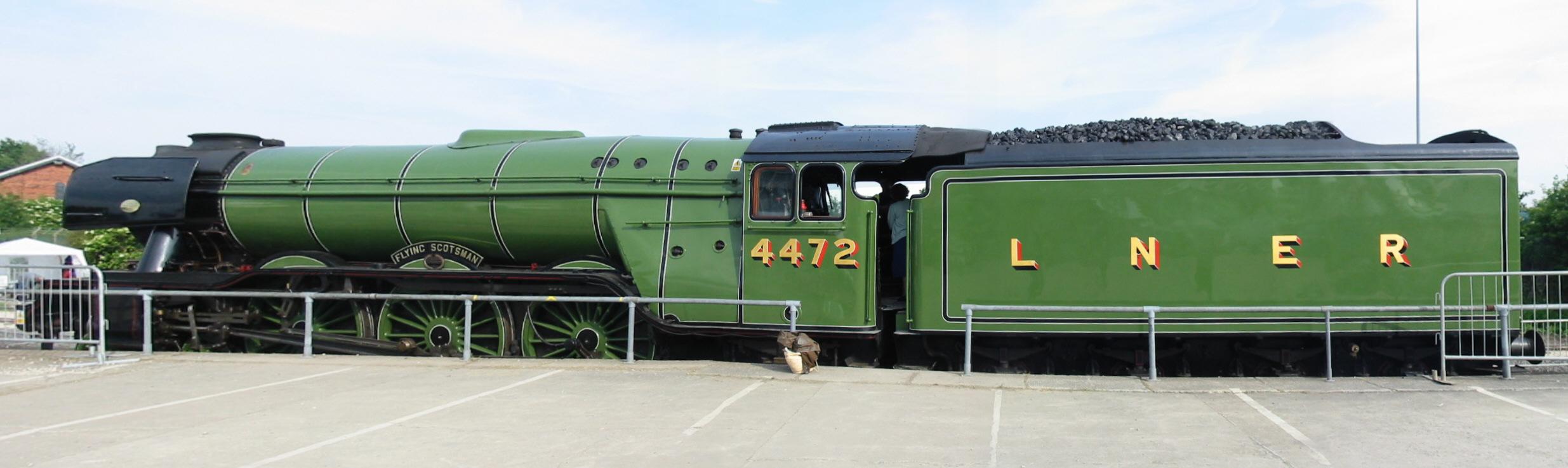
At Railfest 2004

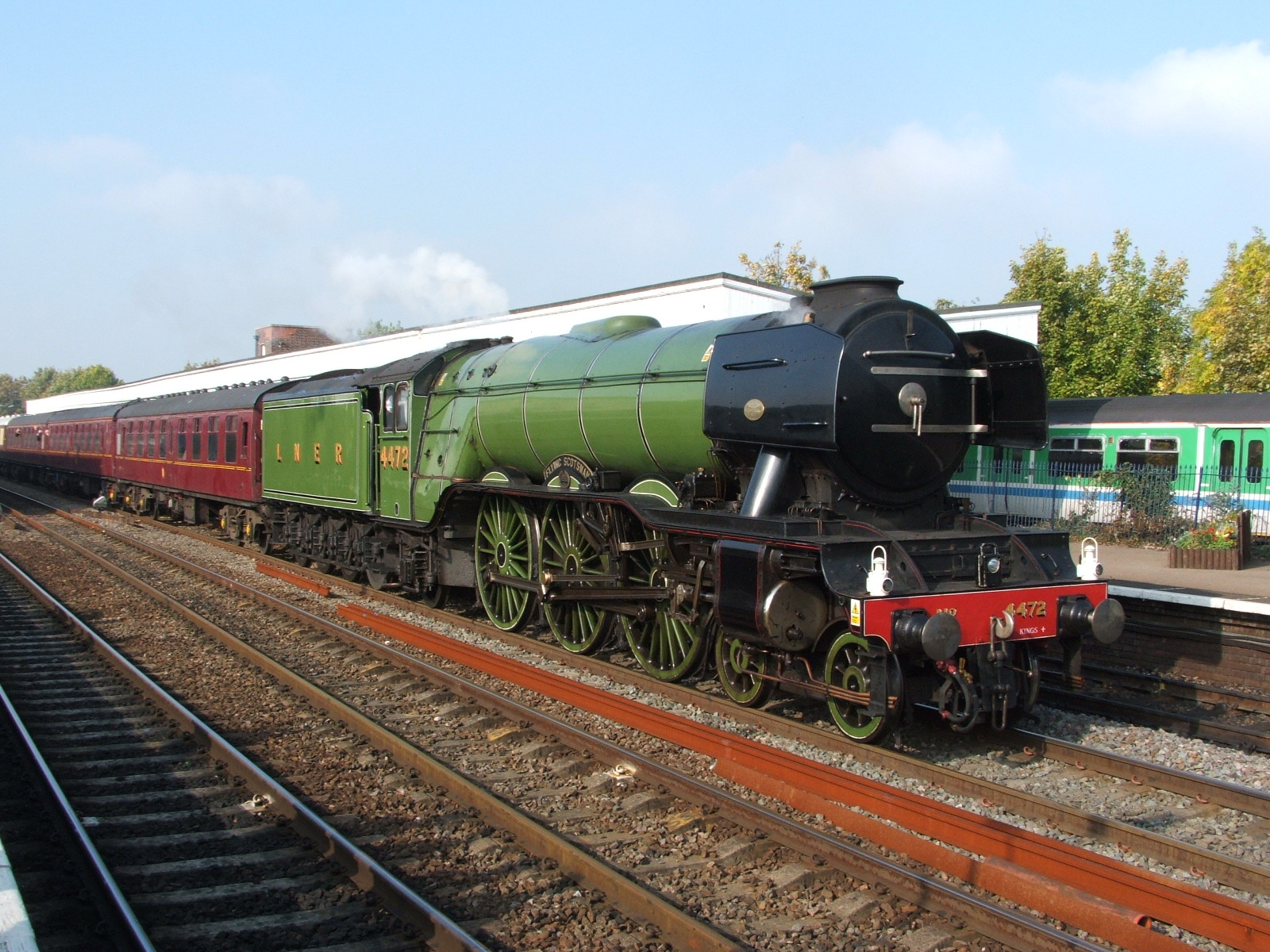
At Leamington Spa in October 2005, shortly before its 10-year restoration

In February 2004, a debt agency acting on behalf of Flying Scotsman plc announced it would hold a sealed bid auction for the locomotive, to be held on 2 April. Amid fears it could be sold into foreign hands, the National Railway Museum (NRM) in York announced it would bid, and appealed for funds with a Save Our Scotsman campaign. It secured a winning bid of £2.3 million, 15% higher than the second highest bidder, and entered public ownership, becoming a part of the NRM's national collection. The bulk of the money came from a £1.8 million grant from the National Heritage Memorial Fund, with the remainder coming from £350,000 raised from public donations which was matched by businessman Richard Branson, and £70,000 raised by The Yorkshire Post newspaper. Included in the sale was a spare boiler from 1944 that Flying Scotsman carried from 1965 to 1978, spare cylinders, and a Mark 1 support coach. The locomotive arrived in York in time to be exhibited as part of the museum's Railfest in June 2004 to celebrate 200 years of rail travel.

In 2004 and 2005, Flying Scotsman intermittently hauled special trains across Great Britain, although problems with its condition soon became apparent. It failed on the delivery trip to Railfest and several times more in the following months, but the museum's engineering staff failed to spot critical faults. From September 2004 until May 2005, it sat at the NRM's workshop for a heavy intermediate repair, the intention being to improve reliability and allow operation until its general overhaul and restoration. However, by the end of 2005 the intermediate repairs failed to improve the situation and the NRM decided to proceed with the general overhaul.

==== Overhaul (2006–2016) ====
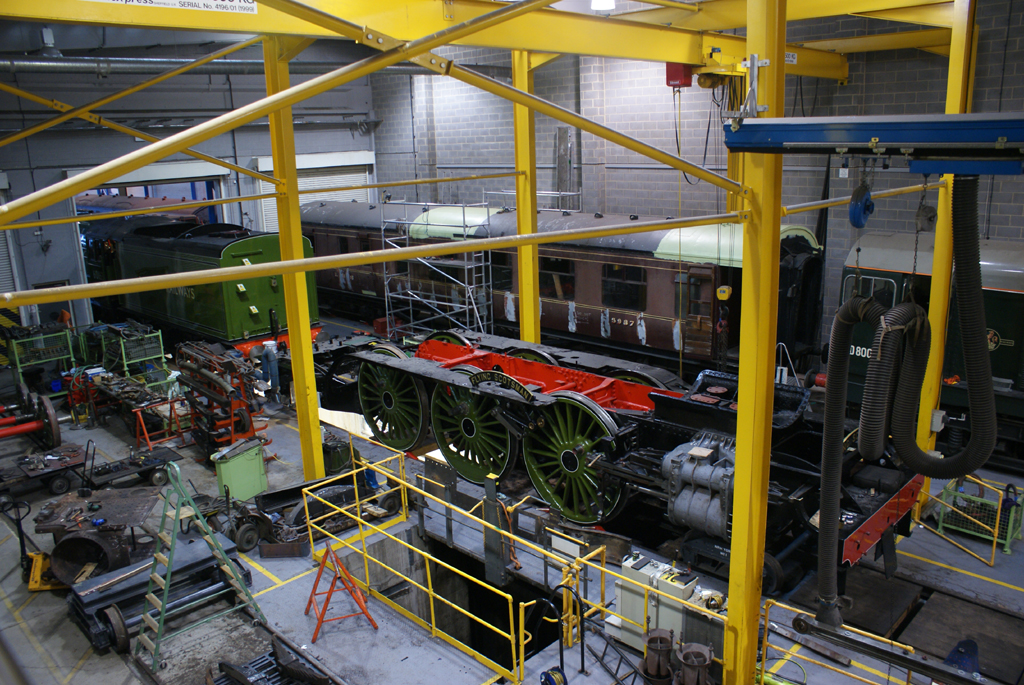
The frames and wheelset in the NRM workshops in 2009

The locomotive entered the NRM's workshops in January 2006, with the original intention to return it to Gresley's original specification and renew its boiler certificate. It was estimated that this would take one year to complete, and cost around £750,000. The works were on view for visitors at the NRM, but the engine was rapidly dismantled to such an extent that the running plate was the only component recognisable to the casual observer.

In July 2007, the museum pushed back the expected completion date by 18 months, due in part to issues with the boiler restoration. By 2009, with further problems encountered including misaligned frames and a cracked cylinder, plus rising metal prices, the museum launched the SOS ("Save Our Scotsman") appeal, seeking to raise a further £250,000 with the aim of completing the work by the end of the year. In May 2011, Flying Scotsman was unveiled on the museum's turntable, finished in wartime black LNER livery; after final tests, it was to be painted LNER Apple Green and have it running excursions by the summer. However, cracks were discovered in the horn blocks and further testing revealed more cracks throughout the frame assembly, leading to the replacement of the main stretcher bar, horn ties and middle cylinder motion bracket, all of which were deemed beyond repair.

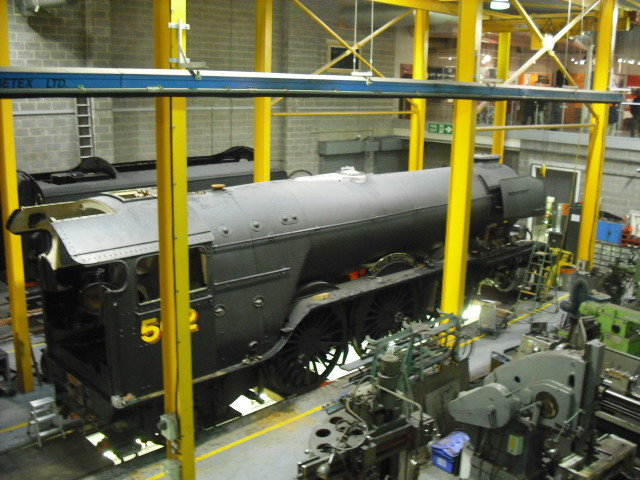
At the NRM's workshops in 2012

In 2012, the NRM published a report examining the reasons for the delay and additional cost. It found that the museum had greatly underestimated the work required due to the locomotive's poor condition, much of which was missed by a rushed inspection which produced an overly optimistic assessment. It also found that management lacked the experience, continuity or resources to undertake such a complex task. Problems were also caused by the conflicting objectives of producing a certified mainline locomotive while retaining as many original components and assemblies as possible, and between the need to overhaul the locomotive and use it as a marketing tool for the museum.

Following the report, First Class Partnerships (FCP) were commissioned to independently review the remaining necessary work. By March 2013, FCP had determined Flying Scotsman would not return to the mainline until 2015, and suggested the outstanding work be put out to external tender. Riley & Son was announced as the winning contractor, and on the same day the locomotive was moved to their workshop in Bury. In July 2015, it was estimated to have Flying Scotsman in service by early 2016, fitted with the signalling equipment required to operate on the mainline. The final cost of the restoration amounted to £4.2 million, having risen by a £300,000 estimate in the summer of 2015 in order to finish the necessary additional work before the deadline.

==== Return to service ====
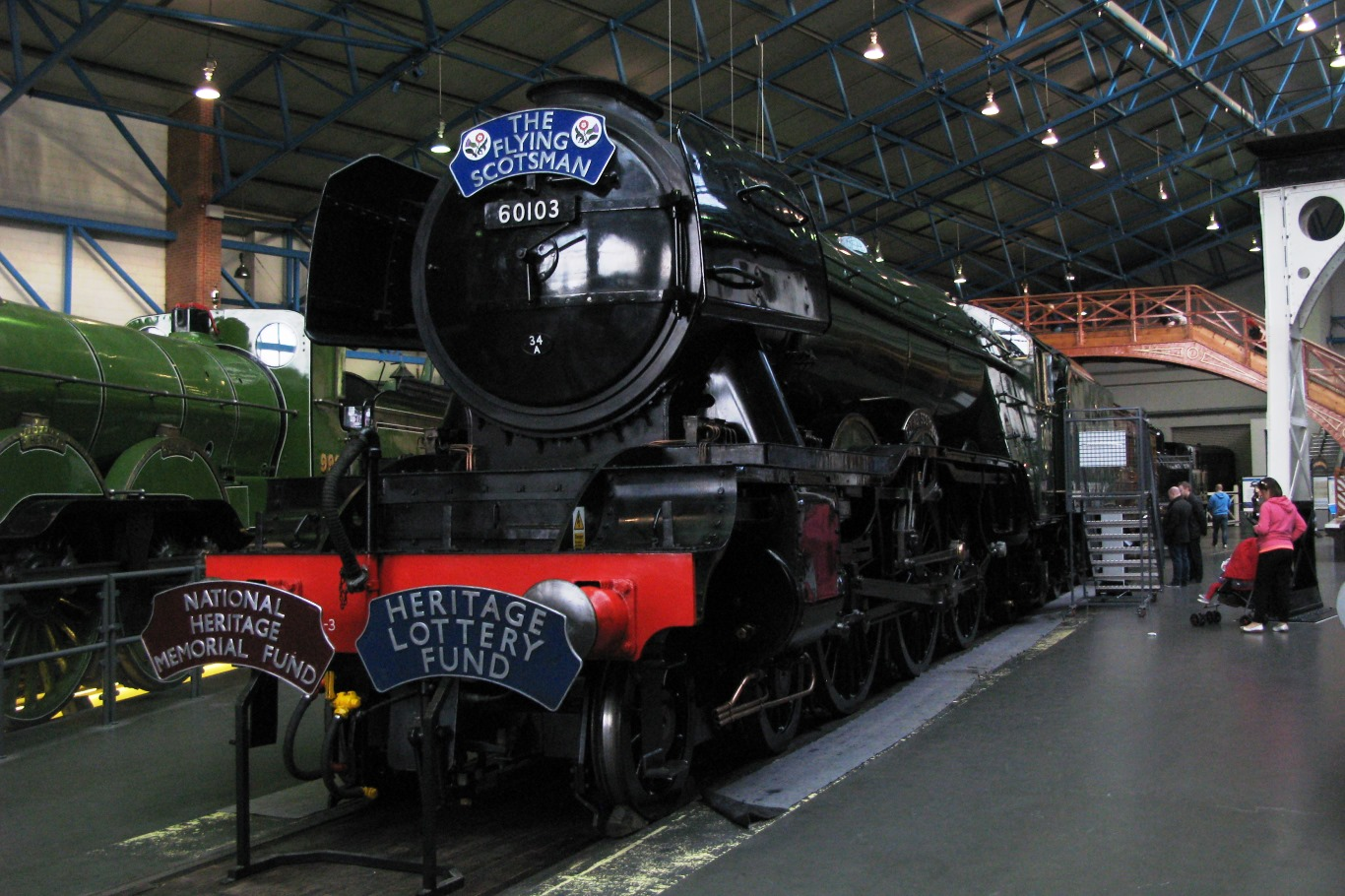
Flying Scotsman on display at the NRM in 2016, after its overhaul

On 7 January 2016, Flying Scotsman moved under its own steam for the first time since 2005 on the East Lancashire Railway, where it completed several low-speed tests. Its inaugural mainline run was on 6 February with The Winter Cumbrian Mountain Express from Carnforth to Carlisle, still wearing its 2011 wartime black livery with 60103 on the smokebox and its LNER wartime numbers, 103 and 502, on the cab sides. After it was restored to match its appearance in 1963, Flying Scotsman returned to London King's Cross on 25 February, with a run to York. Thousands of people lined the route, and the train was forced to stop due to members of the public trespassing on the line near St Neots.

In October 2018, six years after Pegler's death, it hauled the Farewell Alan Pegler special from King's Cross to York, organised at the request of his daughter. In his will, Pegler requested for half of his ashes to be placed in the firebox of the locomotive as it ascended Stoke Bank. The climb was accompanied by a long blast of the whistle as passengers onboard gave a moment of silence. In January 2019, Flying Scotsman hauled the non-stop Scotsman's Salute from King's Cross to York, this time as a tribute to McAlpine following his death in March 2018.

In April 2022, the engine was withdrawn for an overhaul in preparation for its centenary year in 2023. Following the work it will be certified to run on the mainline until 2029, after which it will run solely on heritage railways until 2032. It appeared at London King's Cross as a static display for two days to commemorate the 170th anniversary of the station's opening on 14 and 15 October 2022.

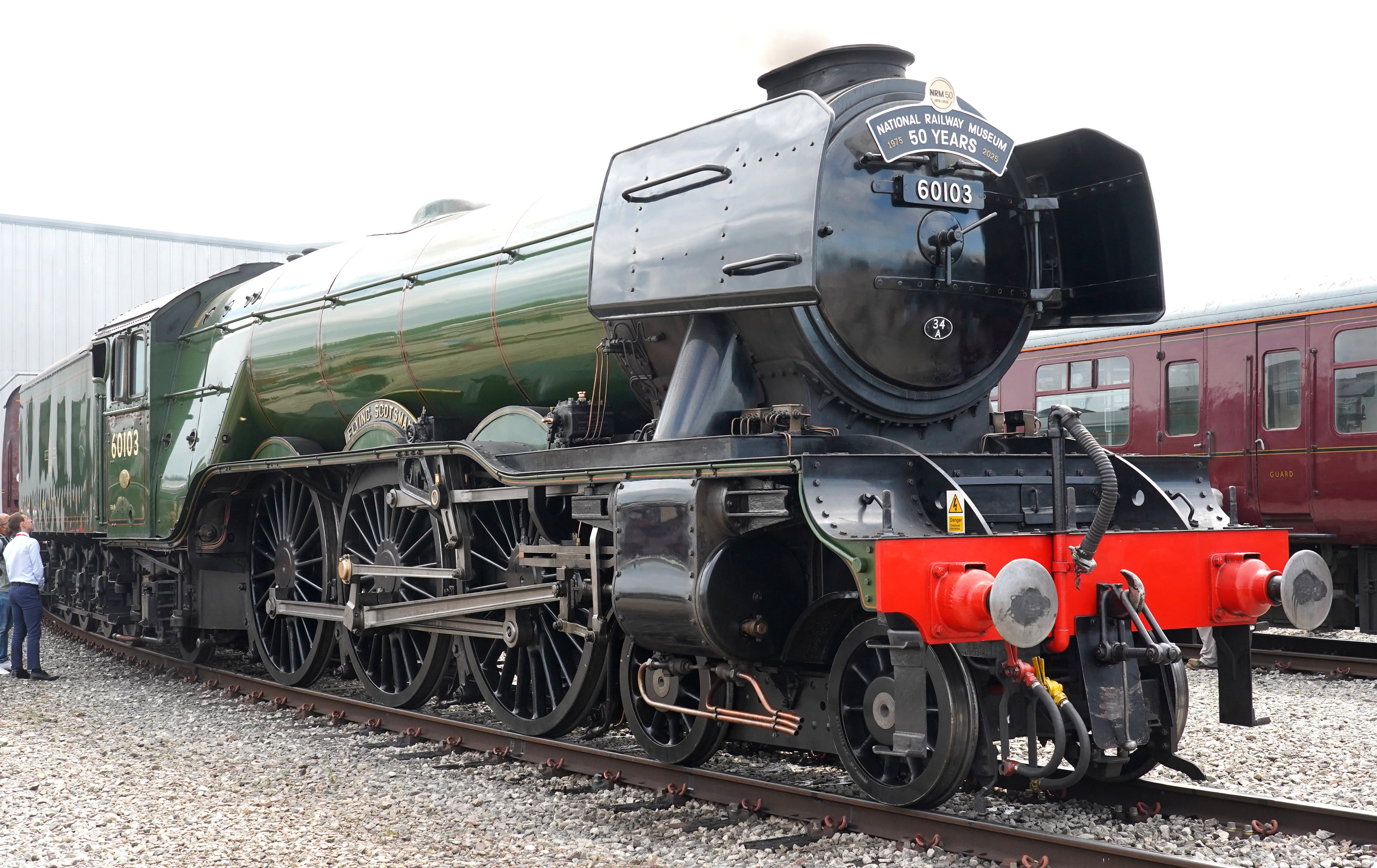
Flying Scotsman at The Greatest Gathering in Derby (2025) after hauling Belmond British Pullman, with "National Railway Museum 50 years" headboard

In January 2024, the museum prepared to solicit bids for a custodian to operate and maintain Flying Scotsman, expecting to pick one in late spring 2024. With a new contract in place, the engine would resume touring in autumn 2024.

==== Centenary events ====
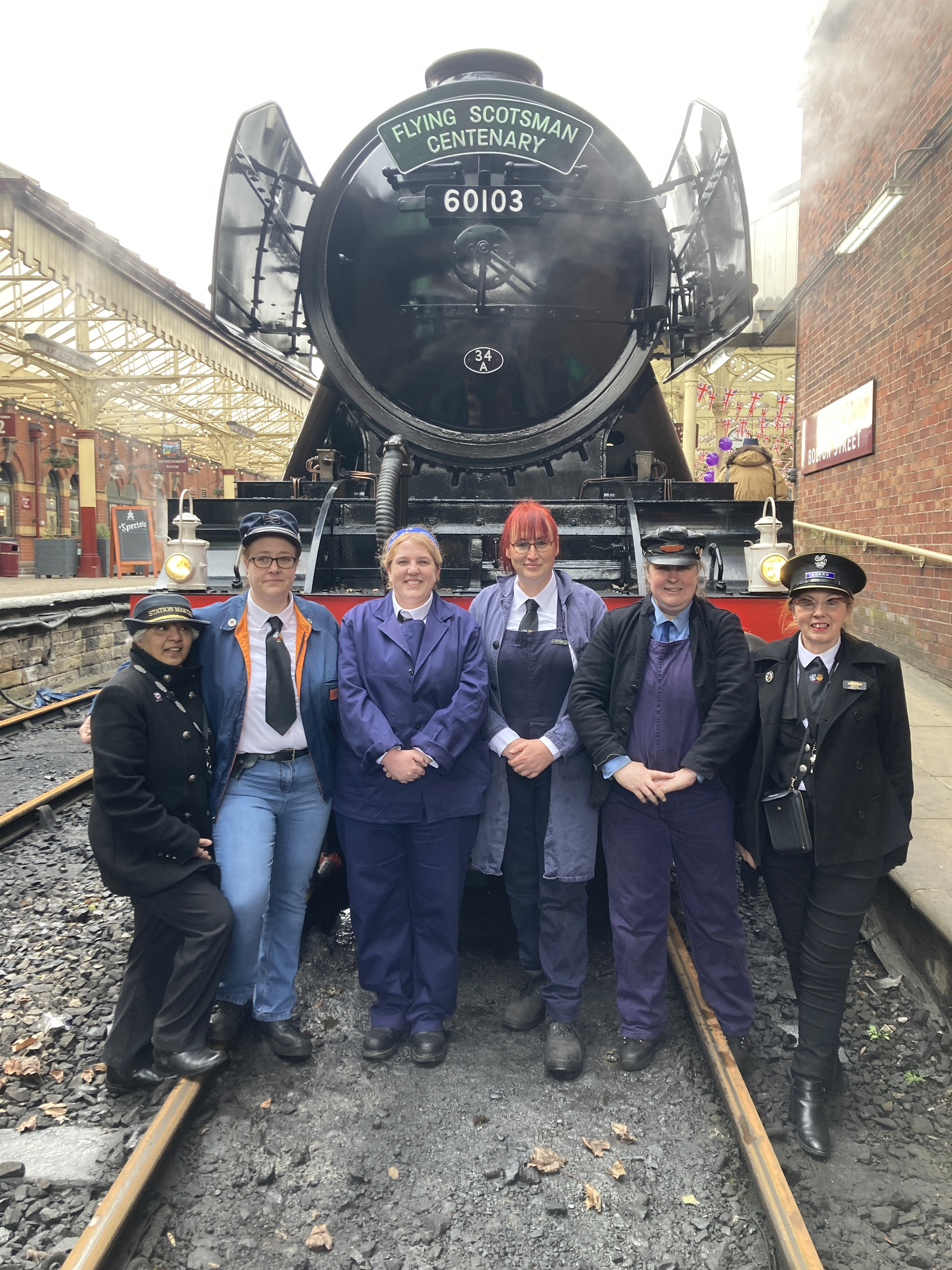
The all-female crew in 2023

In celebration of turning 100 in February 2023, Flying Scotsman took part in various events between March and December including static displays, runs on the mainline, and visits to heritage railways. A special 100 Years, 100 Voices exhibition was held at the National Railway Museum. A collectable £2 coin was produced by the Royal Mint, some of which were in colour inspired by the locomotive's Apple Green livery, which marked the first colour coin produced in over 20 years. Royal Mail produced a set of stamps designed by David Gentleman, which were the last to feature a silhouette of the late Queen Elizabeth II. Poet Laureate Simon Armitage released a new poem entitled "The Making of Flying Scotsman". On International Women's Day, Flying Scotsman was operated by an all-female crew for the second time in its history.

==== Low-speed collision ====
On 29 September 2023, Flying Scotsman was involved in a low-speed collision as it was reversing to couple onto the Belmond Royal Scotsman at Aviemore ahead of its run on the Strathspey Heritage Railway. As a result of the incident, two people were taken to hospital but discharged the same day. The collision caused the gangway of the locomotive tender to become locked with a buffer of the leading coach. The tender's paintwork was damaged but the locomotive was otherwise unaffected.

== In popular culture ==
=== Film and television ===
Because of the LNER's emphasis on using the locomotive for publicity purposes, and then its eventful preservation history, including two international forays, it is one of the UK's most recognised locomotives. One of its first film appearances was in the 1929 film The Flying Scotsman, which featured an entire sequence set aboard the locomotive. In 1966 Blue Peter had a section about the locomotive running between London and Brighton where John Noakes claimed it was "the most famous steam locomotive in the world". Flying Scotsman is seen in Agatha (1979), disguised as two other members of the class–4474 Victor Wild on one side and 4480 Enterprise on the other. Flying Scotsman makes a short appearance in 102 Dalmatians (2000). It was filmed leaving London St Pancras, which was the final steam-hauled departure from the station prior to its reconstruction as the new Eurostar terminal.

In 1985, Flying Scotsman appeared alongside an InterCity 125 in a British Rail television advert. The locomotive was the first choice for the Top Gear Race to the North in 2009, but was unable to attend due to its overhaul; LNER Class A1 60163 Tornado was used instead. In 2011, a Tri-ang Hornby OO gauge model of Flying Scotsman appeared in two episodes of James May's Toy Stories to complete a world record by travelling on the longest model railway of 7 miles from Barnstaple to Bideford in North Devon. It failed early in the trip but completed the run in a subsequent attempt. The model also appeared in James May: The Reassembler, where he completely disassembled and then reassembled it.

In 2016, Flying Scotsman was the subject of two television documentaries. Flying Scotsman from the Footplate aired on BBC 4, and Flying Scotsman with Robson Green was broadcast on ITV. The latter features Green who spent a year with the team of engineers commissioned to restore the locomotive.

=== The Railway Series and Thomas & Friends ===
Flying Scotsman was featured in The Railway Series books by the Rev. W. Awdry. It visited the fictional Island of Sodor in the 23rd book Enterprising Engines to visit its only remaining brother, Gordon. Its two tenders were a key feature of the plot of "Tenders for Henry". When the story was filmed for the television series Thomas & Friends, renamed as "Tender Engines", only Flying Scotsman's two tenders were seen outside a shed. It was intended to have a larger role in this episode, but due to budgetary constraints, the entire model could not be constructed.

Flying Scotsman makes a full appearance in the CGI film Thomas & Friends: The Great Race (2016), where it is voiced by Rufus Jones in both the UK and US dubs.

=== Other ===
Flying Scotsman is featured on Flying Scotsman and Other Steam Locomotives in Action, an LP of field recordings of various steam locomotives in action released by President Records in 1972.

Flying Scotsman is a playable locomotive in the 2001 PC simulation game Microsoft Train Simulator. and in the 2023 PC/Console simulation game Train Sim World 4. The locomotive is also featured in the 2018 racing game Forza Horizon 4, in a Showcase event in which the player must race against the engine.

One of the specially produced £5 coins for the 2012 Summer Olympics featured an engraving of Flying Scotsman on the back.

==== Models ====
Hornby Railways used Flying Scotsman as its Centenary Year edition logo. Hornby marketed two versions of Flying Scotsman in N scale British locomotives made by Minitrix for several years from 1977 as 'Hornby Minitrix'. When the agreement ended Minitrix continued for a while to make and sell British locos and 2 versions of Flying Scotsman were the last listed in catalogues. It was sold first as 60103 in BR green and crest, then later as 4472 in LNER green and lettering.
