= Aus Steam '88 =

Aus Steam '88 was an Australian Bicentenary activity in Melbourne, Australia featuring many steam locomotives from New South Wales, Victoria and also England. The event took place at Spencer Street station from 15 to 29 October, and also included tours on Victorian rail lines involving the participating locomotives.

== History ==
In early 1986, it was suggested at a Steamrail board meeting that something should be done to celebrate Australia's Bicentenary. Inspiration came from the Stockton & Darlington Railway 150th celebrations in England in 1975. Many ideas were canvassed, such as a visit by New South Wales locomotive 3801 and locomotives from other states.

In 1987, Mallard was supposed to visit to Australia. But due to the impending 50th anniversary of the locomotive's 126 miles per hour speed record in 1938, the National Railway Museum declined to allow the locomotive to leave the United Kingdom. Flying Scotsman was suggested as an alternative. But funding had to be arranged.

The owner of the Flying Scotsman, William McAlpine had his bank to do a credit search on Wal Stuchbery (the creator of Aus Steam '88) and his wife, to assess the soundness of the project. After satisfying himself that a repeat of Flying Scotsman's stranding in the United States in 1972 was not likely to occur, McAlpine asked George Hinchcliffe, a former manager of the Flying Scotsman and a former director of Steamtown Railway Museum in Carnforth, where the locomotive was based, to help prepare it for the trip. Final agreement was reached when McAlpine met representatives of the Victorian Department of Transport, and the P&O shipping agent, in Transport House in Yarraville.

Although the Flying Scotsman was set to come to Australia, some problems were emerging. The New South Wales Bicentennial programme was taking its toll, with many locomotives failing and others not restored in time for the celebrations. Nevertheless, the stage was still being set for a spectacular event. Many steam locomotives from New South Wales, Australian Capital Territory and Victoria were available. South Australia was to be part of the celebration but a number of steam locomotives were not able to be restored in time. However many of that state's vintage diesels were able to take part. The two unions involved in the project, the Australian Federated Union of Locomotive Enginemen and the Australian Railways Union, were both very supportive of the committee.

== Delivery runs ==
On Friday 14 October 1988, the Rail Transport Museum's 4201 and the Canberra Railway Museum's 1210 left Goulburn with the first southbound tour train. It was to have included the Lachlan Valley Railway's 5367 but that engine failed with eccentric problems and was not able to make the journey. 3112 also failed on that day, but was able to meet up with 1210 later the next day. 4201 was substituting for the LVR's 4204 which failed motor traction problems. The train was split at Yass Junction. In the gathering dusk and rain, 1210 set off alone on the main line for Cootamundra, with a water gin and four end platform carriages, followed by the 42 class locomotive with the rest of the carriages. The locomotives were hauling a UK tour party train for the event.

On Saturday 15 October 1988, 3112 met up with 1210 overnight and set off from Albury to Melbourne. A parallel run had been planned with the Victorian Railways J515 south of Seymour, but it had to be abandoned due to the standard gauge locomotive's late running. R761 left Melbourne that day to meet up with 3801, the Railways of Australia Bicentennial Train, for a parallel run to Melbourne. 3801 departed Sydney with the Bicentennial Train, assisted by 5910 from Campbelltown to Goulburn.

On Sunday 16 October 1988, 3801 paralleled with R761 from Wodonga all the way to Melbourne. On the same day, the Flying Scotsman was unloaded at Sydney Harbour from the deck of the P&O charter ship New Zealand Pacific and hauled to the Eveleigh Railway Workshops. On Monday 17 October 1988, 4201 hauled the various carriages that had been left in Albury by 1210 and 3112 to Melbourne.

== Program of activities ==
On Tuesday 18 October 1988, two broad gauge trips between Melbourne and Geelong ran. On Wednesday 19 October 1988, Flying Scotsman left Sydney and, after making an overnight stop at Junee, it departed for Albury. While the locomotive was in Sydney, it made a trial run from Sydney to Port Kembla. During its run to Melbourne, it was welcomed by local residents at towns along the way. Many school children cheered the locomotive on. 3801 worked a return run from Melbourne to Seymour and R707 made an evening return run from Melbourne to Woodend.

On Friday 21 October 1988, Elecrail's Tait set worked to Belgrave to connect with a Puffing Billy Railway special to Lakeside, hauled by the newly restored Climax locomotive 1694, double heading with an NA class 2-6-2T as far as Menzies Creek. It was the Climax's first run since its restoration.

On Saturday 22 October 1988, a triple parallel run with 3801, D^{3}639, K153 and R761 occurred. 3801 ran on the standard and D^{3} 639 and K153 on the broad gauge line were both parallel running from Melbourne to Somerton where they meet up with R761.

At Seymour, R761 have been derailed on the standard gauge diamond loop. Diesel locomotives were quickly organised to haul the standard gauge train and R761's train back to Melbourne, while D^{3} 639 and K153 were able to return the third load. 3801 returned to Melbourne as a light engine and R761 headed home next morning.

On Sunday 23 October 1988, an extensive locomotive collection was displayed at Spencer Street station:

Victoria

- D^{3}639
- J515
- K153
- R707
- R761
- F211
- B80
- S317
- T320
- T392
- H5
- X51
- Y169
- C509
- A66
- G533
- N452
- P23
- L1169
- 64RM railmotor

New South Wales

- 1210
- 3112
- 3801
- 4201
- 42218
- 8168

South Australia

- 900
- 947
- 702
- BL26

London & North Eastern Railway

- Flying Scotsman

R761 and K153 ran shuttle trips between Spencer Street and Flinders Street stations throughout the day, while the Elecrail Tait set ran a Mystery Tour. Beside the locomotives at Spencer Street, a good variety of road-based steam power, such as vintage trucks and buses, were on display. There were tram shuttles up Flinders Street.

On Tuesday 25 October 1988, the Flying Scotsman worked its first passenger trip in Australia, when it worked a return Melbourne to Albury service.

== The return home ==
On Thursday 27 October 1988, the New South Wales steam locomotives began the return to their home state. 1210 and 3112 worked a special tour to Albury with K153 running parallel as far as Seymour. 4201 headed for Albury, with C504 in the lead on an interstate freight train, C504 only made it to Donnybrook just north of Melbourne where it became a total failure, locomotive G517 came out from Melbourne to replace the C, and the G and 4201 hauled the freight to NSW. By the next morning, 4201, 1210 and 3112 had reached Cootamundra. 1210 worked alone with four platform end carriages. North from Harden, 1210 and 3112 then double headed to Yass, with 4201 doing the clearing up on its own.

1210 and 3112 ran shuttle trips on the Yass Town line. Meanwhile, 3801 the Bicentennial Train left Melbourne heading to Albury, running parallel with R707 as far as Seymour. On 30 October 1988, 3801 with 5910 set off on the home run to Sydney. However, Flying Scotsman stayed in Melbourne until 17 December 1988.

== Bibliography ==
- Book: "A Vintage Year For Steam: Aus Steam '88 and the Flying Scotsman in Australia", Steven Malpass, John Dare and Ian Jenkin.
- Magazine: Railway Digest, December 1988, January 1989 and February 1989, Australian Railway Historical Society, NSW Division.
