= Z27 =

Z27 may refer to:

- German destroyer Z27, Type 1936A-class destroyer built for the Kriegsmarine during World War II
- New South Wales Z27 class locomotive (formally G.1204 class), a class of steam locomotives built for the New South Wales Government Railways of Australia
- Small nucleolar RNA snoR31/Z110/Z27, a non-coding RNA (ncRNA) molecule which functions in the modification of other small nuclear RNAs (snRNAs)
