= Small nucleolar RNA snoR31/Z110/Z27 =

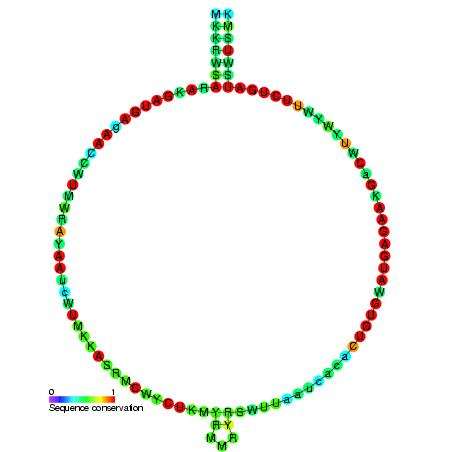
- Predicted secondary structure and sequence conservation of snoR31_Z110_Z27

Identifiers
- Symbol: snoR31_Z110_Z27
- Rfam: RF00353

Other data
- RNA type: Gene; snRNA; snoRNA; CD-box
- Domain: Eukaryota
- GO: GO:0006396 GO:0005730
- SO: SO:0000593
- PDB structures: PDBe

In molecular biology, Small nucleolar RNA Z110 (homologous to Z27 and R31) is a non-coding RNA (ncRNA) molecule which functions in the modification of other small nuclear RNAs (snRNAs). This type of modifying RNA is usually located in the nucleolus of the eukaryotic cell which is a major site of snRNA biogenesis. It is known as a small nucleolar RNA (snoRNA) and also often referred to as a guide RNA. snoRNA Z110 belongs to the C/D box class of snoRNAs which contain the conserved sequence motifs known as the C box (UGAUGA) and the D box (CUGA). Most of the members of the box C/D family function in directing site-specific 2'-O-methylation of substrate RNAs Plant snoRNA Z110 was identified in screens of Arabidopsis thaliana and Oryza sativa .
