= Hamilton Central (disambiguation) =

Hamilton Central or Central Hamilton may refer to:

== Canada ==
- Hamilton Centre, a federal electoral district
- Hamilton Centre (provincial electoral district), a provincial electoral district of Ontario

== New Zealand ==
- Hamilton Central, the business district of the city of Hamilton

== Scotland ==
- Hamilton Central railway station, a railway station in Hamilton, South Lanarkshire

== See also ==
- Hamilton East (disambiguation)
- Hamilton North (disambiguation)
- Hamilton South (disambiguation)
- Hamilton West (disambiguation)
