= Miss Porter's House =

Historic house in Newcastle, New South Wales, Australia

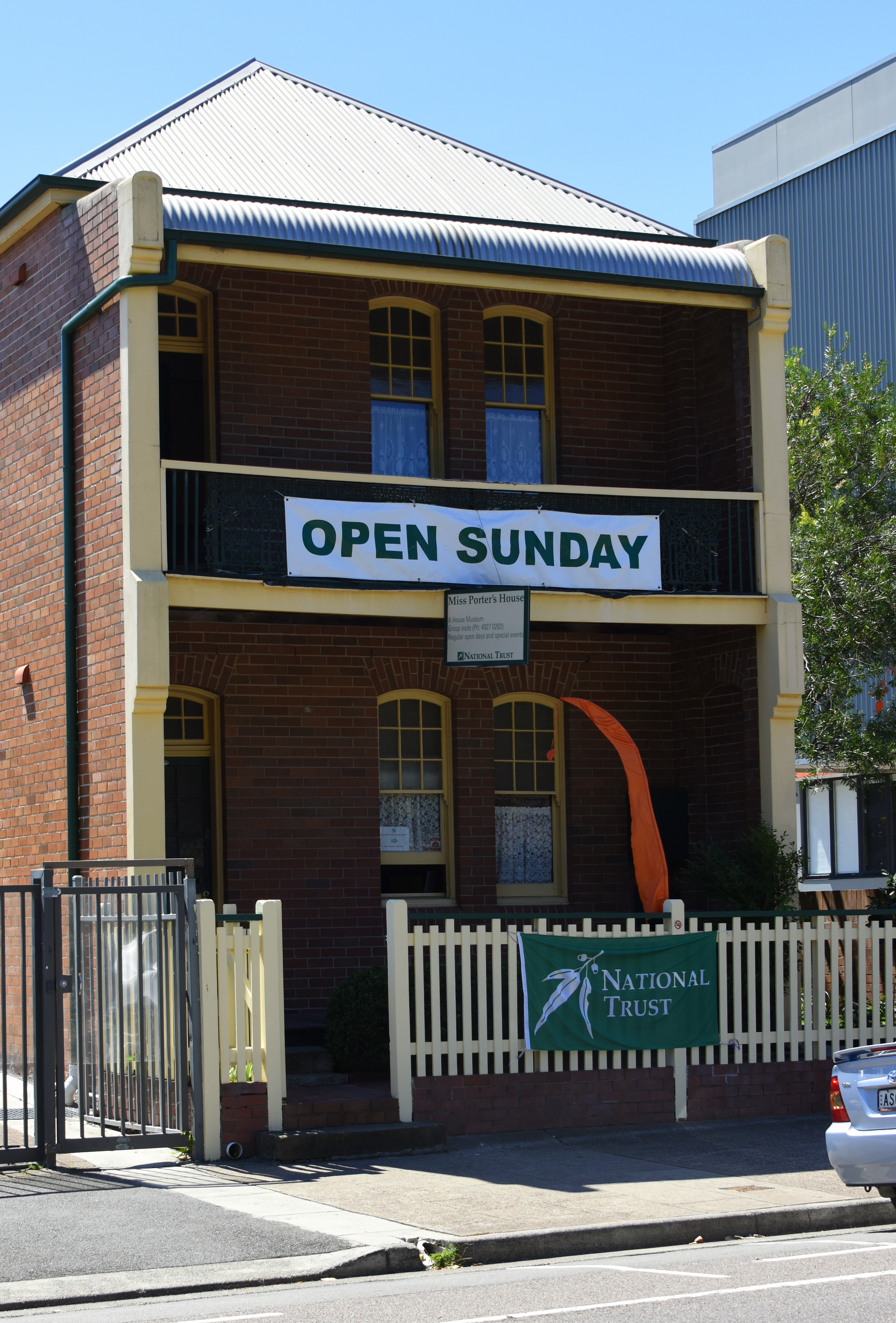

- Location within New South Wales Location within Australia
- 32.9277°S 151.7648°E
- Location: 434 King Street, Newcastle West, Newcastle, City of Newcastle, New South Wales, Australia

Site notes
- Owner: National Trust of Australia (NSW)

New South Wales Heritage Register
- Official name: Miss Porter's House
- Type: state heritage (built)
- Designated: 17 November 2000
- Reference no.: 1445
- Type: House
- Category: Residential buildings (private)
- Builders: J T Owen

Miss Porter's House is a heritage-listed former residence and now house museum at 434 King Street, Newcastle West, Newcastle, City of Newcastle, New South Wales, Australia. It was built by John T Owen. The property is owned by the National Trust of Australia (NSW). It was added to the New South Wales State Heritage Register on 17 November 2000.

== History ==
In the early 1860s, the seventeen year old James Porter travelled from his native England and took up farming on the estuary islands of the Hunter River. He married Eliza Lintott and, by the early 1870s, was ready to set himself up as a general storekeeper and carrier in Blane Street (now Hunter Street West). Here he and Eliza reared their family, while James became a well known figure in local business and social life of the community.

In 1907, James Porter purchased from the Australian Agricultural Company an allotment of land facing Langford Street and at the rear of his shop for £350. Part of this allotment was conveyed in 1909 to his son Herbert who, with his new wife Florence Evelyn Jolley, was now ready to establish his own home and family. In the same year, Herbert contracted John T. Owen to build his house for £498. The final payment in December 1909 included an additional £14 for extras and gasfittings.

Built in 1909 'Miss Porter's House' has always been a distinctive Edwardian home in an otherwise non-residential area. It stands on land known prior to its subdivision as 'Lock's Paddock', a stonemason's yard. The extensive buildings of the Gas Company occupied most of the land opposite while the Steel Street produce markets were to the west and homes of the Chinese market gardeners in nearby Devonshire Street. As the century progressed, the industrial nature of the area gave way to commerce and administration. However Miss Porter's house remains as the sole residential building.

Herbert and Florence Porter set about to furnish their home and, in February 1911, Florence gave birth to the Porter's first daughter, Ella. Later in the year, Galley & Frogley of Charlton Street, Wickham, constructed a "bush house" at the property.

After the death of James Porter in 1912 his estate was held in trust for the use of Eliza, his wife, during her life. At this time Herbert received two horses and a lorry as a bequest and he and his brother Daniel continued to operate the Porter business on behalf of their mother. On Eliza's death in July 1919, James' estate was liquidated and the proceeds divided among his six surviving children, or their heirs. As Herbert Porter had died in April 1919, just before his mother, his one sixth share which amounted to over £1000 passed to his children Ella and Hazel.

In the aftermath of World War I, a serious epidemic of influenza swept the world. Australia was not excluded and among the Newcastle victims was Herbert Porter, aged only 41 Years (in 1919). Florence Porter and her two daughters Ella and Hazel, the latter only five years old, were left on their own. These were sad years for the family. Eliza, Herbert's mother died in July 1919 and his sister, Elsie May followed in September 1921.

Immediately after her husband's death Florence Porter had a very limited income. She owned the house and Herbert's assets, which for the tax year 1917/18 were recorded as a bank deposit of just over £250, plus his horses and carts. In 1925 Florence drew maintenance from the trust accounts which held Ella and Hazel's inheritance from the estate of James Porter. She received a little over £12 per week from this source. Her own family owned land in the Singleton area but Florence's mother, Ann Hilder, lived with Florence, Ella and Hazel during the last few years of her life. On Ann's death in 1927 Florence received one fifth of her estate, which in 1926 had been valued at £140.

Ella and Hazel were enrolled, like their father before them, at Cooks Hill Public School. With reports of good work and good conduct Ella is known to have subsequently found work as a typist, however this ceased during the Depression. Hazel completed her schooling at Wickham Domestic Science School and then attended Newcastle Business College. She left at the end of 1931 with excellent references and worked in office administration for several well-established Newcastle financial businesses from at least 1933 until her retirement as an Office Manager in 1984.

A highlight in the lives of Mrs Porter and her daughters was the selection of Hollingwood, the homestead near Singleton where Florence Porter was born, as the location for the 1949 Australian film "Eureka Stockade". Produced and directed by Harry Watt, this was said to be the most ambitious Australian film attempted to that time. Australian actor Chips Rafferty played Peter Lalor and 140 people were on location. The Porter women came to Hollingwood to share in the general excitement of this unusual episode. Their photographs and press clippings attest to their enjoyment of this significant occasion.

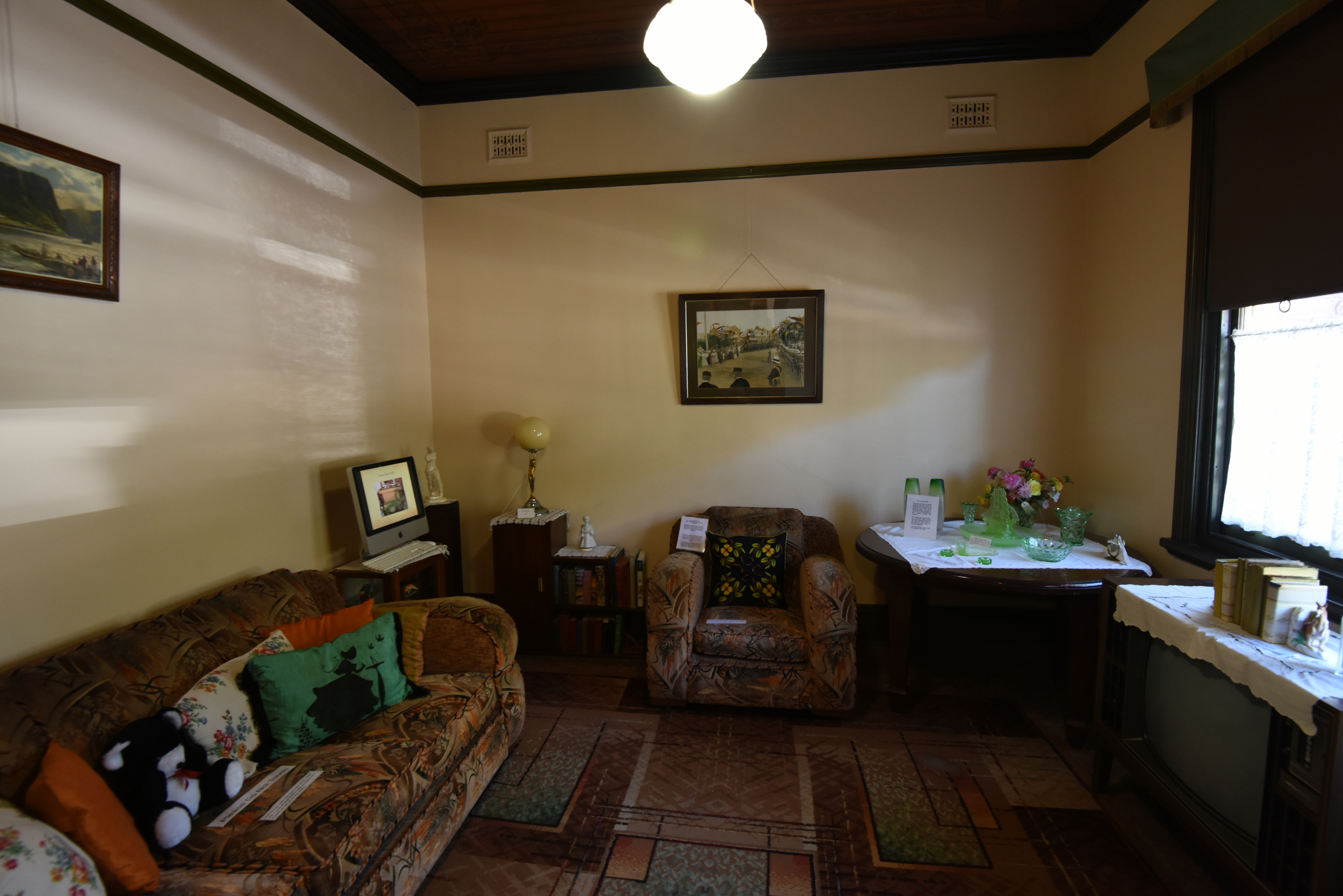

Miss Porter's House became the lifelong home of the two daughters, neither of whom married. Florence Porter died in August 1970 at the age of 91, after a long widowhood of almost 50 years. Ella and Hazel continued to live at 434 King Street where, in 1975, they renewed the bush house. Ella died in 1995, aged 84 years leaving Hazel to continue alone in the house until her own death in 1997, aged 83.

Prior to her death, Hazel contemplated the future of the family home. The inner-city site had been long sought for redevelopment, however Hazel decided to bequeath the house, its contents and an endowment to the National Trust of Australia (NSW).

The house and its contents are representative of the middle-class urban lifestyle of the early twentieth century. The Porter family enjoyed modest prosperity during the working lives of their menfolk. The womenfolk carefully managed the home during their long occupancy from 1910 to 1997. Theirs was a modest, quiet and private lifestyle. The Porter sisters steadfastly retained their personal possessions and the Trust has been intrigued by the collection of clothing, fabrics, craft materials, linen and general household items that remain in the cupboards and sideboards. The house is a living home, offering today a rare and privileged visit into lives at another time.

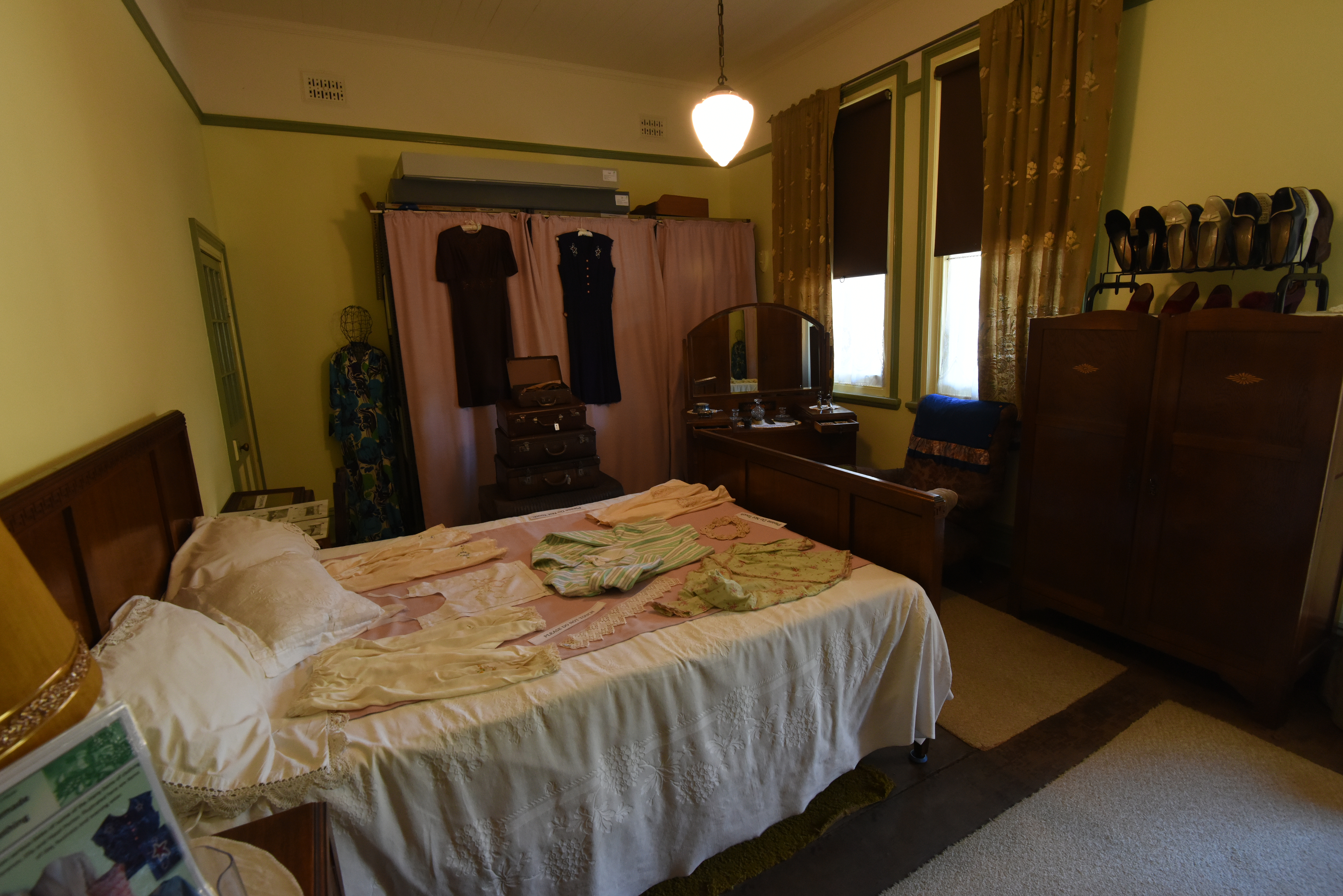

Since 1997 National Trust of Australia (NSW) volunteers have maintained the building itself, the gardens and valuable collection of artefacts housed there, raising money towards its upkeep.

The West End of Newcastle, where Miss Porter's House is, has been characterised by decline in the twentieth century – buildings falling derelict, being demolished and spasmodic development of a few new buildings of low quality. Australia's largest Kentucky Fried Chicken now occupies the site of the former gracious Palais Royale and, under that, an important Aboriginal midden. The neighbourhood has contained a proliferation of cheap pubs, tattoo parlors, sex shops, brothels and small optimistic businesses that rise and fall within a season.

A number of fine heritage buildings survive, despite the general decline. As well as Miss Porter's house, there is the former Police Station, the TAFE Art School buildings, the Royal Theatre, the Bank Corner, the old Water Board Building, Stegga's Arcade and several commercial buildings in Hunter Street. Miss Porter's House is the only heritage building to retain its original form, house its original contents and continue to function as a going concern.

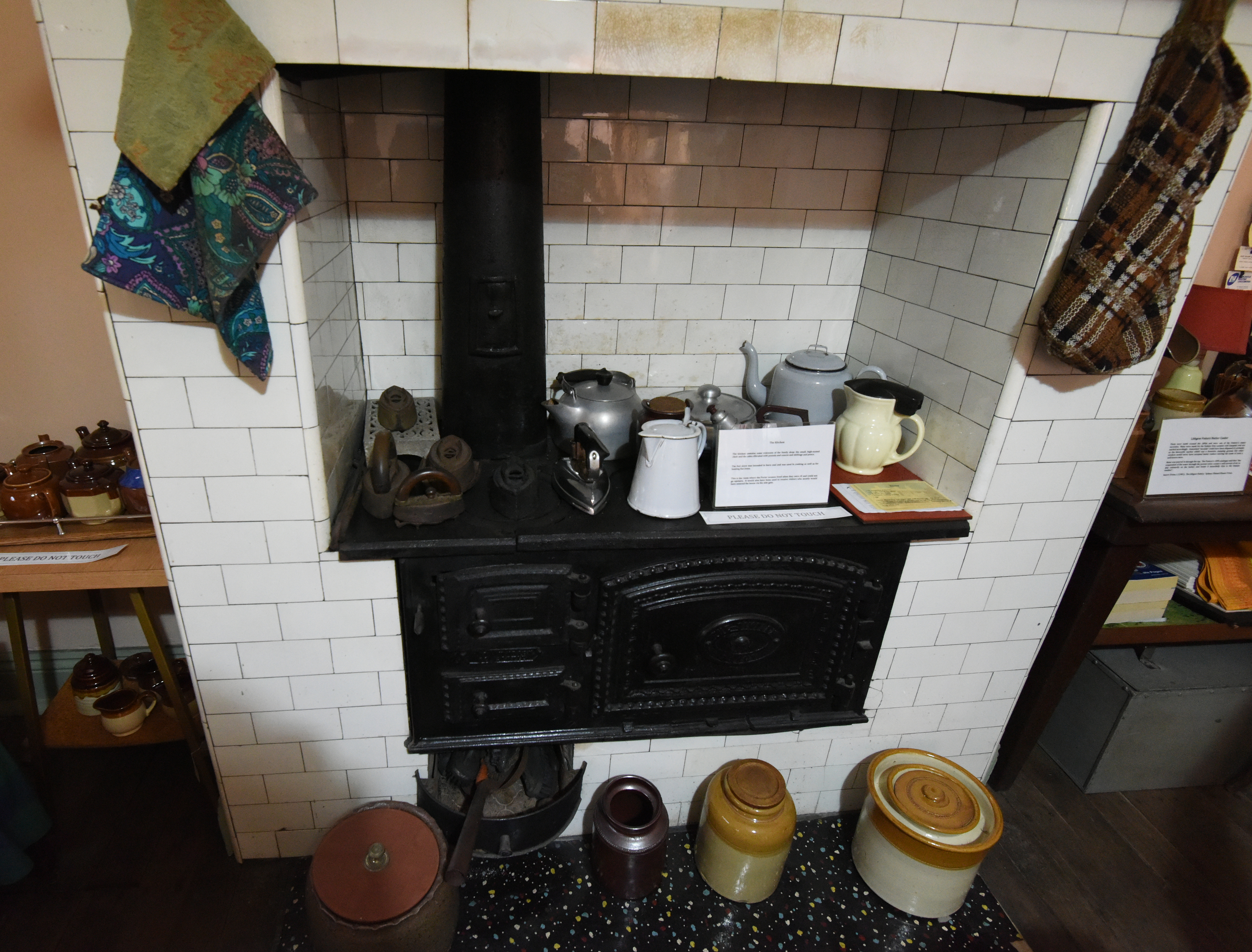

On 28 December 2014 Newcastle commemorated the 25th anniversary of the devastating earthquake which hit the city on 28 December 1989. Miss Porter's House is close to where most of the quake's 13 deaths occurred. Photographs and contemporaneous reports show that the damage to the house was great. The external skin of brick and the balcony roof had fallen; daylight was visible between walls and ceilings. 90 years of industrial soot that had gathered in the ceilings and wall cavities was now spread across the furniture, floors and walls. Some argued the house should be demolished, but Ella and Hazel Porter thought otherwise. Hazel drafted letters to the insurance company and the Town Clerk asking that their home be saved. Her case was convincing. During the rebuilding period, the sisters lived in rental premises. Don Barnett, the architect at the Water Board offices next to the Porters, and his wife befriended the women and helped them in this period. Don, who thought the building beyond repair, was assigned to talk to the women about the construction of a brick fence between the Board offices and their house. He eventually became the architect responsible for the repair, a task he carried out without charge.

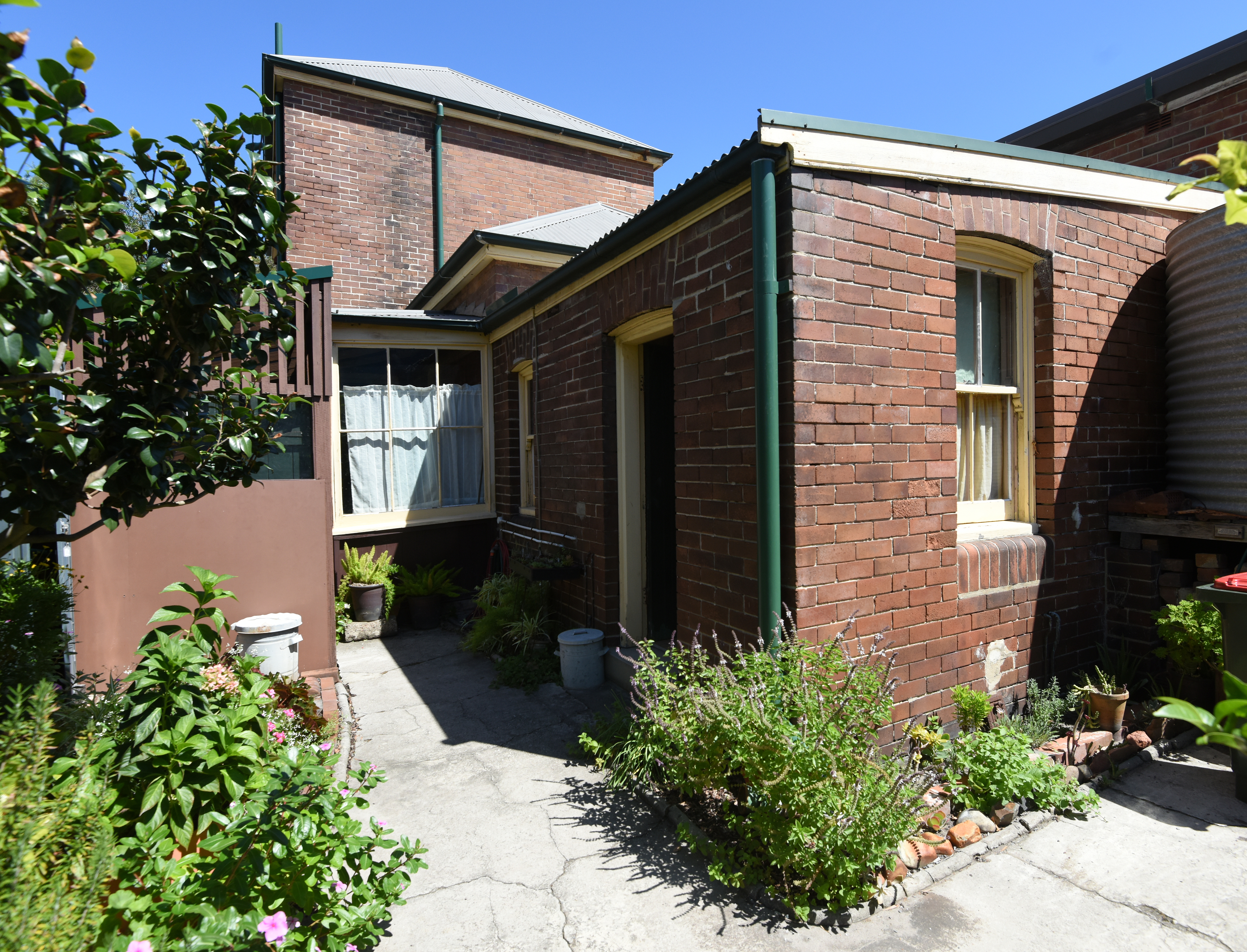

Ella and Hazel Porter were very private, single women in their late 70s, who had lived in the one house all their lives. The need to live elsewhere seems to have provided an opportunity – a necessity – to reassess their lives and interface with the wider world, to a modest degree. Seizing the opportunity, the women installed an indoor toilet in their newly renovated bathroom, along with the earthquake repairs. During the rebuilding, some of the original architectural detail was lost, probably in the interests of economy. Other Water Board employees also took some interest in the Porters' welfare. Such was the relationship that in 2005 the Water Board sponsored a new rainwater tank in the Porters' back yard. Since 1997 volunteers have been cataloguing the more than 5000 Porter family objects and documents that form the collection in the house.

A Museums and Galleries NSW grant in 2015 allowed the Trust to undertake photography for Miss Porter's House.

By 2017 cataloguing and photography of the Miss Porter's House Collection was complete. The Collection of objects and documents is now available online at www.ehive.com. It can also be inspected by contacting Miss Porter's House.

== Description ==
Miss Porter's house is a free standing two storey Federation terrace. It is constructed of stretcher bond brick and has a corrugated iron hipped roof. The first floor features a balcony with cast iron balustrade. The house, located in the business district of King Street, has landmark qualities as a distinctive residential home in an otherwise non-residential area.

Miss Porter's House is a highly intact entity that incorporates the house, grounds, interiors and contents. The interiors are very intact and demonstrate two layers of interior decoration – the original fit out in 1909 and again between 1935 and 1939. Of particular note are the stencilled timber ceilings, fine Queensland maple staircase, art deco rugs, linoleum, and art deco light fittings. The collection has high research potential as it contains a complete set of accounts, invoices and other paper based ephemera. Such a collection that illustrates the lives of one family over a ninety-year period is extremely rare in Australia.

From the entrance hallway, a sitting room opens to the right, furnished with the crocodile velvet lounge suite and coffee table on the carpet square with its "feltex" surround, purchased by Florence in 1939. The 1940s radiator still gives out heat in winter.

The hallway opens into a large dining room furnished with table, chairs, sideboards and palm stand, much of it purchased by Herbert Porter to furnish his new house in 1909. The dining room also contains the only fireplace in the main part of the house. The quality of the property's internal decorative features is outstanding. A richly decorated linoleum floor covering leads from the dining room to the hallway. A fine timber staircase leads to two upstairs bedrooms. The stencilled timber ceilings of the hallway and two principal downstairs rooms are exquisite.

From the dining room, a door leads onto a verandah, adjacent to which is the "bush house". Together the verandah and bush house provide an outdoor living area which visitors to the family remember as being well used. From the verandah one can enter a rear kitchen with a large fireplace and range. A table, sideboard and couch furnish this room. An adjacent scullery has been converted to a kitchenette. A large bathroom and laundry open from a small hallway.

A small yard extended from this area, where a water tank, outdoor toilet, storage space for the oddments of a house-hold and garden are to be found.

== Heritage listing ==
Miss Porter's House, 434 King Street Newcastle, built in 1909, is rare because it is a highly intact entity that incorporates the house, grounds, interiors and contents. It has historical significance as a residential property continuously occupied by the one family – the Porter family – over a ninety-year period. The house with furnishings is a poignant insight into the design and organisation of Edwardian homes and demonstrates the quiet urban lifestyle of the Porter family in the regional urban district of Newcastle. The collection has high research potential as it contains a complete set of accounts, invoices and other paper based ephemera.

Miss Porter's House has retained many original features. The interiors have aesthetic significance as they are very intact and demonstrate two layers of interior decoration – the original fit out in 1909 and a second round of furnishing between 1935 and 1939. Of particular note are the stencilled timber ceilings, fine Queensland maple staircase, art deco rugs, linoleum, and art deco light fittings.

Miss Porter's House was listed on the New South Wales State Heritage Register on 17 November 2000 having satisfied the following criteria.

The place is important in demonstrating the course, or pattern, of cultural or natural history in New South Wales.

It has historical significance as an example of a 1909 family home in Newcastle with interrelated house, gardens, outbuildings, interiors, including a collection of well provenanced furnishings and personal items remaining in their room and spatial arrangements. The house is a poignant insight into the design and organisation of Edwardian homes. In addition to documenting family life in Newcastle from 1909, the house demonstrates changes to family circumstances with the loss of the principal breadwinner after the 1919 influenza epidemic and the efforts of the Porter women to sustain a comfortable if modest lifestyle until the 1990s.

The intact 1930s living room and the other furniture acquired in 1935 and 1939 provides evidence of Florence's changing tastes in line with the streamlined art deco fashions of the 1930s. Her updating of the living room suggests her desire and financial ability to maintain the family's comfortable standard of living.

The place is important in demonstrating aesthetic characteristics and/or a high degree of creative or technical achievement in New South Wales.

The house is also uncluttered and has a homely appearance with the orderly arrangement of personal items and furniture giving a view into the private domestic world of the Porter women.

The place has potential to yield information that will contribute to an understanding of the cultural or natural history of New South Wales.

The house, including its contents and spatial arrangements, has research significance for the study of Edwardian and 1930s interiors. It also has research significance for the study of domestic life in Newcastle from 1909 and the Porter women until 1997 and their achievement in maintaining a modest but comfortable family home after the loss of the main breadwinner. Further research into the clothes and textiles in the house are likely to provide information on the shopping, dress making and social activities of the women. The remaining accounts, invoices and other paper based ephemera provide insight into both the lives of the Porter family, and their contemporaries in Newcastle.

The place possesses uncommon, rare or endangered aspects of the cultural or natural history of New South Wales.

A rare example of an intact Edwardian home with a provenanced collection of furnishings and personal items which give a rare insight into domestic life in Newcastle and the lifestyle of the Porter women. The interior finishes, including linoleum and the intact kitchen and other rooms showing material evidence of domestic and family activities from 1909 to 1997 are rare.
