= Bar Beach =

Bar Beach may refer to:

- Bar Beach, Lagos, a former beach in Lagos
- Bar Beach (New York), a beach in Port Washington on Long Island
- Bar Beach, New South Wales, a suburb of Newcastle
