= St John's Anglican Church, Newcastle =

St John's Anglican Church
- Church of St John the Evangelist
- St John's Cooks Hill
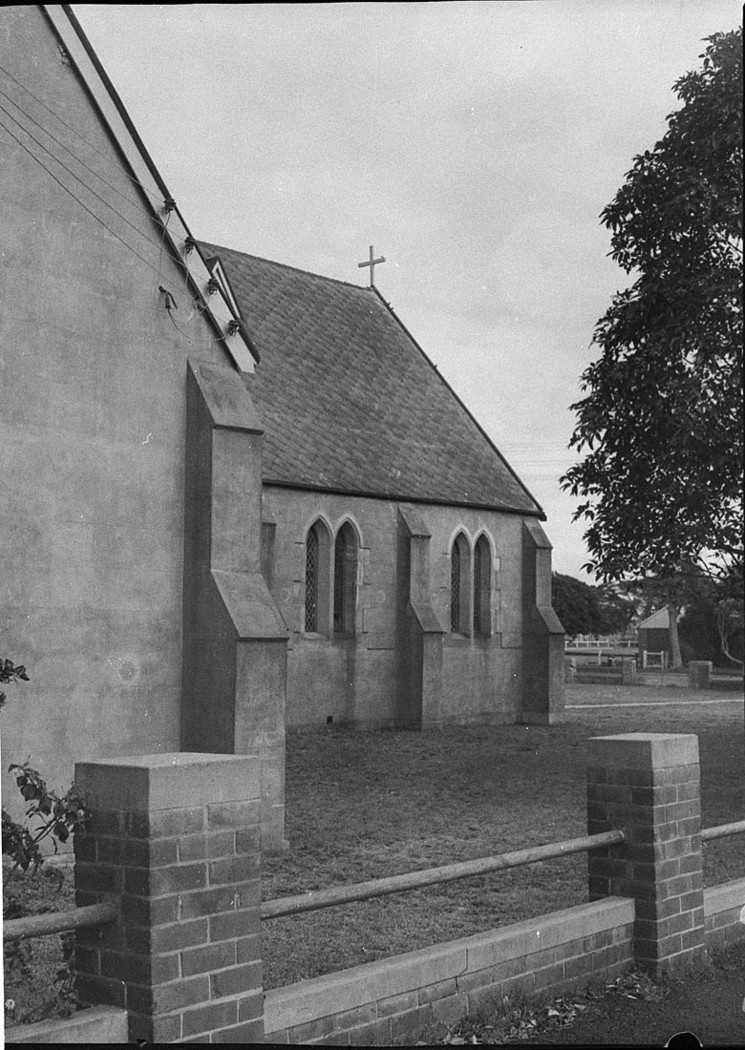
- St John's Church of England, Cooks Hill, pictured in 1957

- Location in New South Wales
- 32°56′03″S 151°46′06″E
- Location: 1D Parry Street, Cooks Hill, Newcastle, New South Wales
- Country: Australia
- Denomination: Anglicanism

History
- Status: Parish church
- Founded: 1 March 1856
- Founder: Bishop Tyrrell
- Dedication: Saint John the Evangelist
- Consecrated: 20 July 1860

Architecture
- Architect: Edmund Blacket (attributed)
- Architectural type: Church
- Style: Old Colonial Grecian Revival
- Groundbreaking: 21 July 1857
- Construction cost: A£8,357.17.9

Administration
- Province: New South Wales
- Diocese: Newcastle

New South Wales Heritage Register
- Official name: St John's Anglican Church
- Type: Built
- Criteria: a., c., d., e., f., g.
- Designated: 2 April 1999
- Reference no.: 00124

The St John's Anglican Church, formally the Church of St John the Evangelist, also called St John's Cooks Hill, is an Anglican church in Newcastle, New South Wales, Australia. It is the oldest remaining church building in Newcastle, completed in 1860. The building, the design of which is attributed to colonial architect Edmund Blacket, in the Old Colonial Grecian Revival style, is located close to the city centre at 1D Parry Street, Cooks Hill. It was added to the New South Wales State Heritage Register on 2 April 1999.

== History ==
The church was built for the largely mining population of Newcastle. The first bishop of Newcastle, Bishop Tyrrell had noted that only the wealthy of the district attended Christ Church, and in order that the people may be "reclaimed from practical atheism" the new parish included the suburban area at that time as far as Waratah, Lambton, Adamstown and Cardiff, in addition to its mining core in the Glebe and Merewether.

In 1856 a school and parsonage were commenced on 1½ acres of land "at present in a state of bush" and abutting on the Lake Macquarie Road (later to become Darby Street). This land was donated by the Australian Agricultural Company (AA Coy), and the new parish was founded on 1 March 1856 by Bishop Tyrrell. The Revd. L.H. Rumsey was appointed as the first Rector. He held a master's degree in Arts at Oxford and came to Newcastle in 1856 direct from England for what Bishop Tyrrell described as "real missionary work".

In 1857 the building of the church was commenced and the foundation stone, which cannot now be located, was laid on 21 July of that year. The building was consecrated on 20 February 1860. It seems that Bishop Tyrrell purchased designs for a school and a large church and managed to get his money's worth by using the church design three times: St John's, Newcastle; St Paul's at West Maitland and St. Paul's at Ipswich (at that time part of the Diocese of Newcastle). Although a William White is credited as the architect of St Paul's, West Maitland, it is possible that he worked from the design or made construction drawings.

The money was made available through the fund which AA Coy and Walter Stevenson Davidson, a director and a banker, co-instigated in 1854 to provide money for the construction of churches and schools in this area where the company had derived considerable wealth through mining and agriculture. The fund raised £8,357.17.9 and of this Davidson personally contributed £5,000. £2,956.9.0 was added by fifty-one other Anglican shareholders with interest of £401.8.9. A portion was allotted to the Peel River area and the remainder was for St. John's church and schoolroom.

Several modifications have been made to the church throughout its history. The church exterior walls were rendered in 1863–64. A belfry was added to the north gable in 1865. The north transept was converted to a chapel in 1920. In 1952–53, the sanctuary floor was replaced by a raised concrete slab, and a nave centre aisle was adopted. The 1989 Newcastle earthquake resulted in the demolition of the two-storey rectory.

== Description ==
The Church walls are hand pressed sandstock bricks, rendered inside and out, on mudstone foundations with stone windows and door surrounds. It is cruciform in plan, 105 ft long, 92 ft across transepts, the nave is 30 ft wide. The high pitched timber roof trusses have hammer beams and support purlins, rafters and boarding under the present aluminium sheeting which replaced at least two previous coverings. Most pews are of the original cedar, restored, All the windows are of stained or pressed glass, some are original. The Walker two manual pipe organ was made and installed in 1866.

The Hall walls are also sandstocks on stone foundations with a galvanised iron roof, the former two-storied master's house is now the hall kitchen, entrance hall and meeting room, with Sunday school quarters above.

The Church dimensionally is as it was when built, the hall was extended in 1904, and some Georgian features lost at that time were restored when it was worked over before its reopening in 1985. All work was heritage approved.

Both the church and church hall were reported to be in good condition as at 4 May 2000.

== Decoration and items of significant cultural note ==
The church has seen a number of changes since its foundation. However, it holds a number of important and significantly important items closely related to the Parish and the City of Newcastle.

- The King's Town Chalice and Paten, being one of the few silver and silver gilt items of the convict period predating the naming of the City of Newcastle
- A restored beamed and painted ceiling in the sanctuary, with Victorian gothic stars
- The oldest pipe organ in the city, restored and in full working order
- Fully restored stained glass windows, some pressed from the time of the foundation; these include an unusual sanctuary glass of Christ in Glory
- A complete set of original Australian cedar pews, including a set of gothic altar chairs
- A pair of gothic altar tablets, of outstanding design
- A WW1 war memorial to the men of the Parish
- A set of 5 wall hangings by the textile artist and TAFE teacher, John Scriven, dedicated to the 4 Apostles and Mary, the Mother of Our Lord
- An unusual pyx in the shape of a dove, symbolising the Holy Spirit

== Heritage listing ==
The Church and Church Hall are the oldest surviving examples of such work in the Newcastle area, and are a fine pair of buildings, earlier than their surrounds, set on spacious grounds opposite Centennial Park within the historic Cooks Hill area.

St John's Anglican Church, Newcastle was listed on the New South Wales State Heritage Register on 2 April 1999 having satisfied the following criteria.

The place is important in demonstrating the course, or pattern, of cultural or natural history in New South Wales.

It is a link with the early history of Newcastle's development as a coal producer and exporter under the management of the Australian Agricultural Company.

The place is important in demonstrating aesthetic characteristics and/or a high degree of creative or technical achievement in New South Wales.

A pleasant and complementary group of buildings set in a comparatively open space amongst later housing developments in the historic Cooks Hill precinct.

The place has strong or special association with a particular community or cultural group in New South Wales for social, cultural or spiritual reasons.

The first Bishop of Newcastle, Bishop Tyrell, combined with the Australian Agricultural Company, donors of the land, and W. S. Davidson and other A.A. Co. shareholders to the purposes set out in an 1854 memo to the company in London: "To enable persons to worship in the church of their forefathers, and to attract a population to the property of the company." Also, to provide a building in which the children of the employees could be provided with an education.

The place has potential to yield information that will contribute to an understanding of the cultural or natural history of New South Wales.

A fine example of a large and imposing town church built in the 1850s in the Newcastle area, worthy of architectural study.

The place possesses uncommon, rare or endangered aspects of the cultural or natural history of New South Wales.

The church and hall are sole survivors as buildings of their age, and as such are irreplaceable.

The place is important in demonstrating the principal characteristics of a class of cultural or natural places/environments in New South Wales.

The church group has been in continual use for ecclesiastical purposes, in the case of the school, under such supervision, since each building was commissioned. Its continuity in this regard has put its stamp on the area.

== See also ==
- Australian non-residential architectural styles
- List of Anglican churches in New South Wales
