= Hamilton South =

Hamilton South may refer to:

- In Australia

- Hamilton South, New South Wales

- In Ontario, Canada:

- Hamilton South (electoral district), 1953 to 1965

- In Scotland, UK:

- Hamilton South (UK Parliament constituency), 1997 to 2005
- Hamilton South (Scottish Parliament constituency), 1999 to present
- Hamilton South (ward), electoral ward

== See also ==
- South Hamilton, Massachusetts
