= Newcastle West, New South Wales =

Newcastle West
- Suburb
- The shopping precinct of Newcastle West

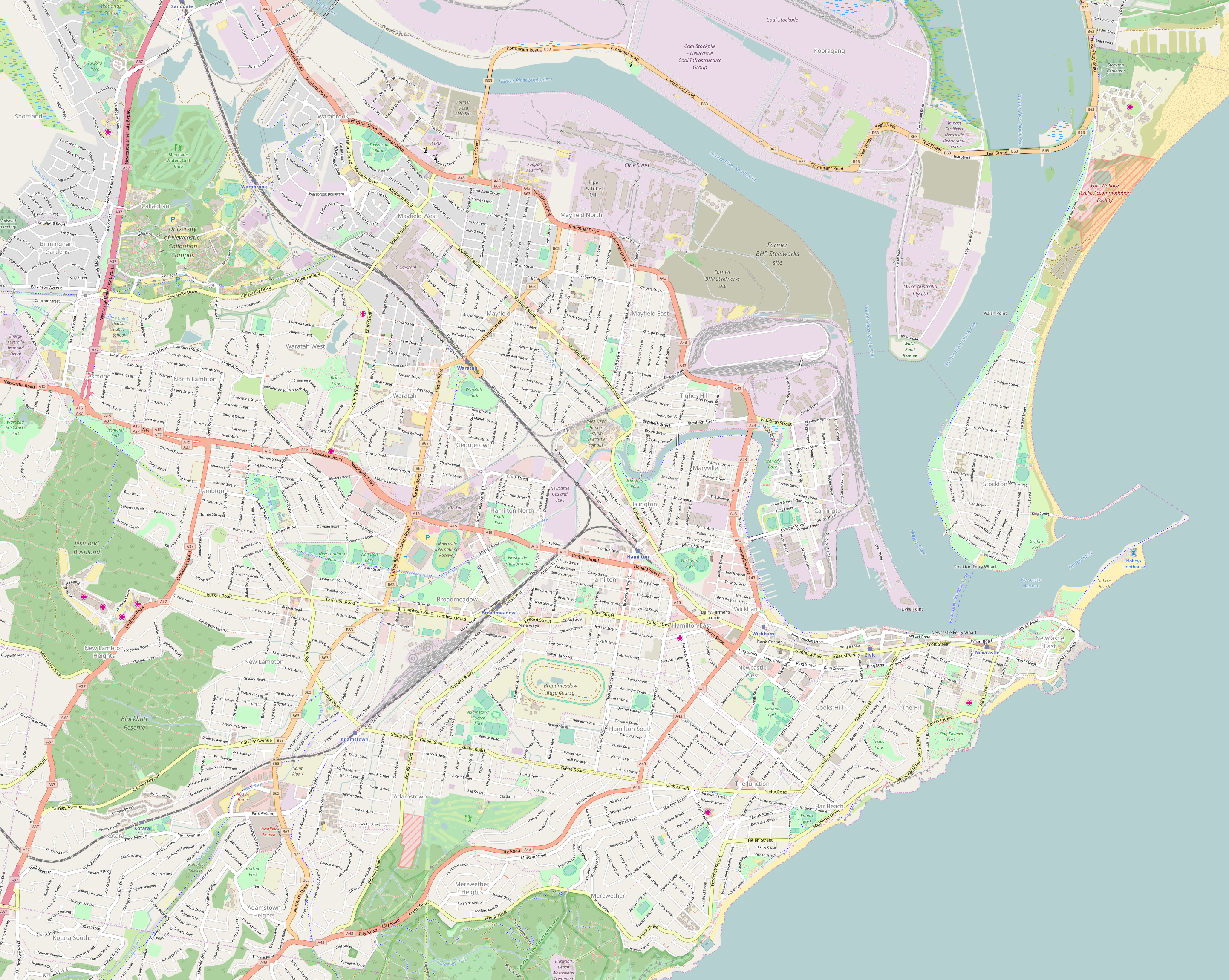
- Interactive map of Newcastle West
- Coordinates: 32°55′43.3″S 151°45′39.3″E
- Country: Australia
- State: New South Wales
- Region: Hunter
- City: Newcastle
- LGA: City of Newcastle
- Location: 1 km (0.62 mi) W of Newcastle; 34 km (21 mi) SE of Maitland; 166 km (103 mi) NNE of Sydney

Government
  - State electorate: Newcastle
  - Federal division: Newcastle

Area^{Note1}
  - Total: 0.84 km^{2} (0.32 sq mi)
- Elevation: 6 m (20 ft)

Population
  - Total: 1,453 (SAL 2021)
  - Density: 414.2/km^{2} (1,073/sq mi)
- Postcode: 2302
- County: Northumberland
- Parish: Newcastle
Suburbs around Newcastle West
Hamilton	Wickham, Newcastle	Newcastle
Hamilton East	Newcastle West	Newcastle, Cooks Hill
Hamilton South	Hamilton South, Cooks Hill	Cooks Hill

Newcastle West is an inner city suburb of Newcastle, New South Wales, Australia, part of which forms the western end of Newcastle's central business district. The suburb is primarily a retail/commercial trading district but includes one high school.

At the 2016 census Newcastle West had a population of 618.

== Education ==
Newcastle High School, located at the intersection of National Park Street and Parkway Avenue, is a state run high school that has an enrolment of approximately 1,000 students.

== Heritage listings ==
Newcastle West has a number of heritage-listed sites, including:

- 787 Hunter Street: Castlemaine Brewery
- 434 King Street: Miss Porter's House

== Notes ==
1. Area obtained from New South Wales Department of Lands imagery and 1:100000 map Newcastle 9232.
