= USS WST-1 =

Tugboat of the United States Navy

Coordinates: 32.939°S 151.771°E

History

United States
- Name: USS WST-1
- Builder: Adams & Company, Berrys Bay, Sydney, Australia
- Launched: 1945
- Fate: Ran aground on 27 July 1945.

General characteristics
- Type: Salvage tug
- Displacement: 325 tons
- Complement: 12

USS WST-1 was a 325-ton salvage tug of the United States Navy during World War II.

She was built by Adams & Company, Berrys Bay, Sydney, Australia for the United States Navy in 1945. While travelling up the east coast of Australia, she ran aground on rocks off Bar Beach, New South Wales, Newcastle in heavy fog on 27 July 1945 and was holed. Captain W. F. Martin and the eleven crew were rescued.
