= Hamilton East =

Hamilton East may refer to:

== Australia ==
- Hamilton East, New South Wales, a suburb of Newcastle, New South Wales

== Canada ==
- Hamilton East (federal electoral district), a former federal electoral district in Ontario
- Hamilton East (provincial electoral district), a former provincial electoral district in Ontario
- Hamilton East—Stoney Creek, a federal and provincial electoral district in Ontario

== New Zealand ==
- Hamilton East, New Zealand, a suburb in Hamilton
- Hamilton East (New Zealand electorate), a parliamentary electorate

== United Kingdom ==
- Lanark and Hamilton East (UK Parliament constituency), a county constituency of the British House of Commons
- Hamilton North and East (ward), electoral ward in Scotland
