= The Junction, New South Wales =

The Junction
- Suburb
- The Junction School in 1960.

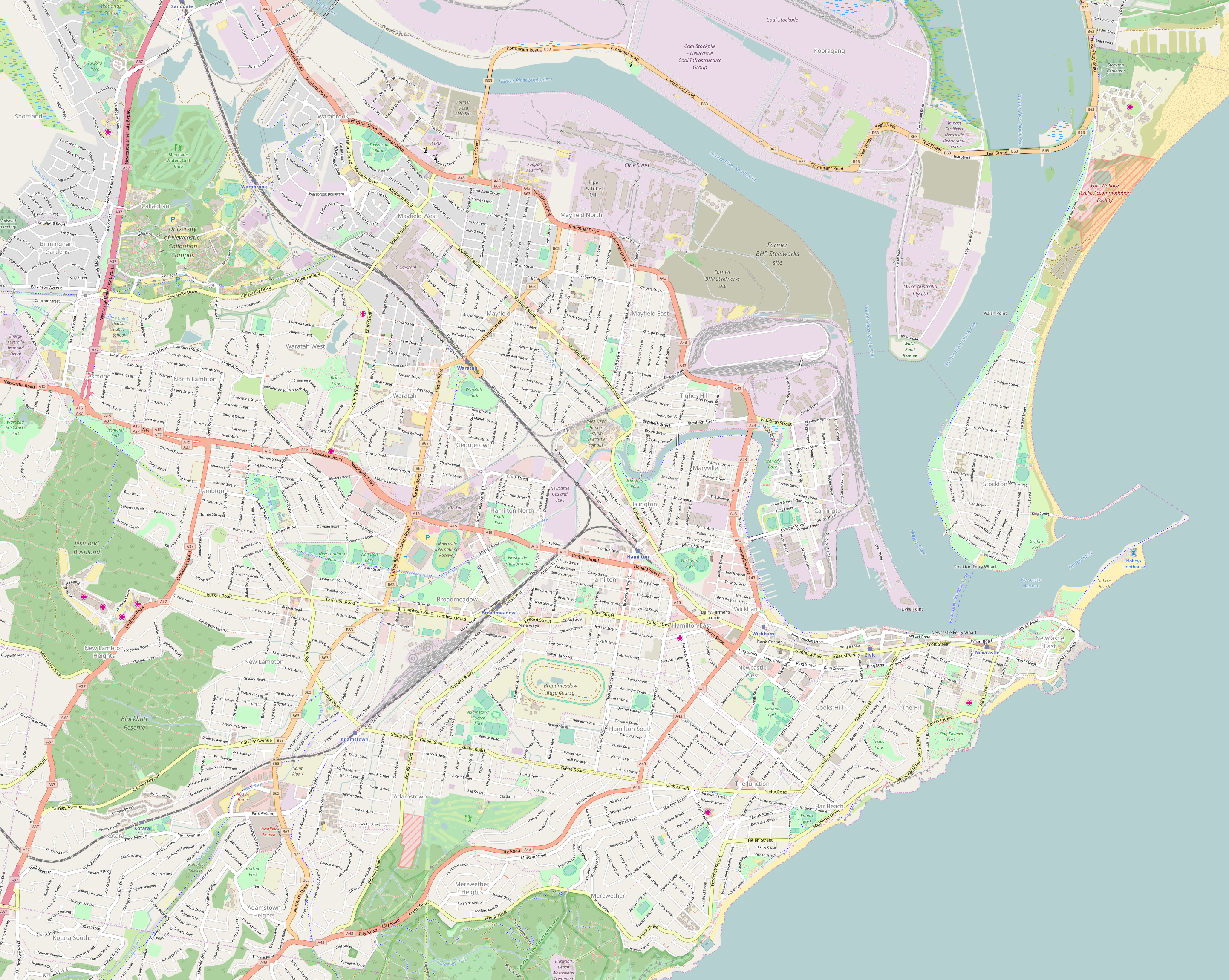
- Interactive map of The Junction
- Coordinates: 32°56′25″S 151°45′32″E
- Country: Australia
- State: New South Wales
- Region: Hunter
- City: Newcastle
- LGA: City of Newcastle
- Location: 2.8 km (1.7 mi) SW of Newcastle; 7 km (4.3 mi) NE of Charlestown

Government
  - State electorate: Newcastle
  - Federal division: Newcastle

Area^{Note1}
  - Total: 0.35 km^{2} (0.14 sq mi)
- Elevation: 6 m (20 ft)

Population
  - Total: 994 (SAL 2021)
  - Density: 3,700/km^{2} (9,600/sq mi)
- Postcode: 2291
- County: Northumberland
- Parish: Newcastle
Suburbs around The Junction
Hamilton South, Merewether	Hamilton South	Cooks Hill
Merewether	The Junction	Bar Beach
Merewether	Merewether	Bar Beach

The Junction is a small, inner city suburb of Newcastle, New South Wales, Australia, located 2.8 km (1.7 mi) southwest of Newcastle's central business district. It was originally part of Merewether, which is reflected in the names of some of the suburb's establishments, but was gazetted as a suburb on 17 May 1991.

At the 2016 census The Junction had a population of around 1,000.

The name of the suburb is from a former coal railway junction. The Burwood Coal Company's railway ran along what is now Union St and then further south toward Merewether. Another line branched off it, at a railway junction, to run west down what is now Glebe Road. The railway closed in 1954.

== Education ==
The Junction has two schools, both of which cater to Primary students.

The Junction Public School was established in 1872 on land donated by Mr Edward Charles Merewether. It suffered significant damage during the 1989 Newcastle earthquake and much of the school had to be demolished.

St Joseph's Primary School in Farquhar St is a Catholic school that was established in 1885.

== Recreational Activities ==
Arnold's Swim Centre is located on 46 Kemp Street which offers babies classes to advanced courses.

== Notes ==
1. Area obtained from Land and Property Management Authority imagery and 1:100000 map Newcastle 9232.
