= Hamilton South, New South Wales =

Hamilton South
- Suburb
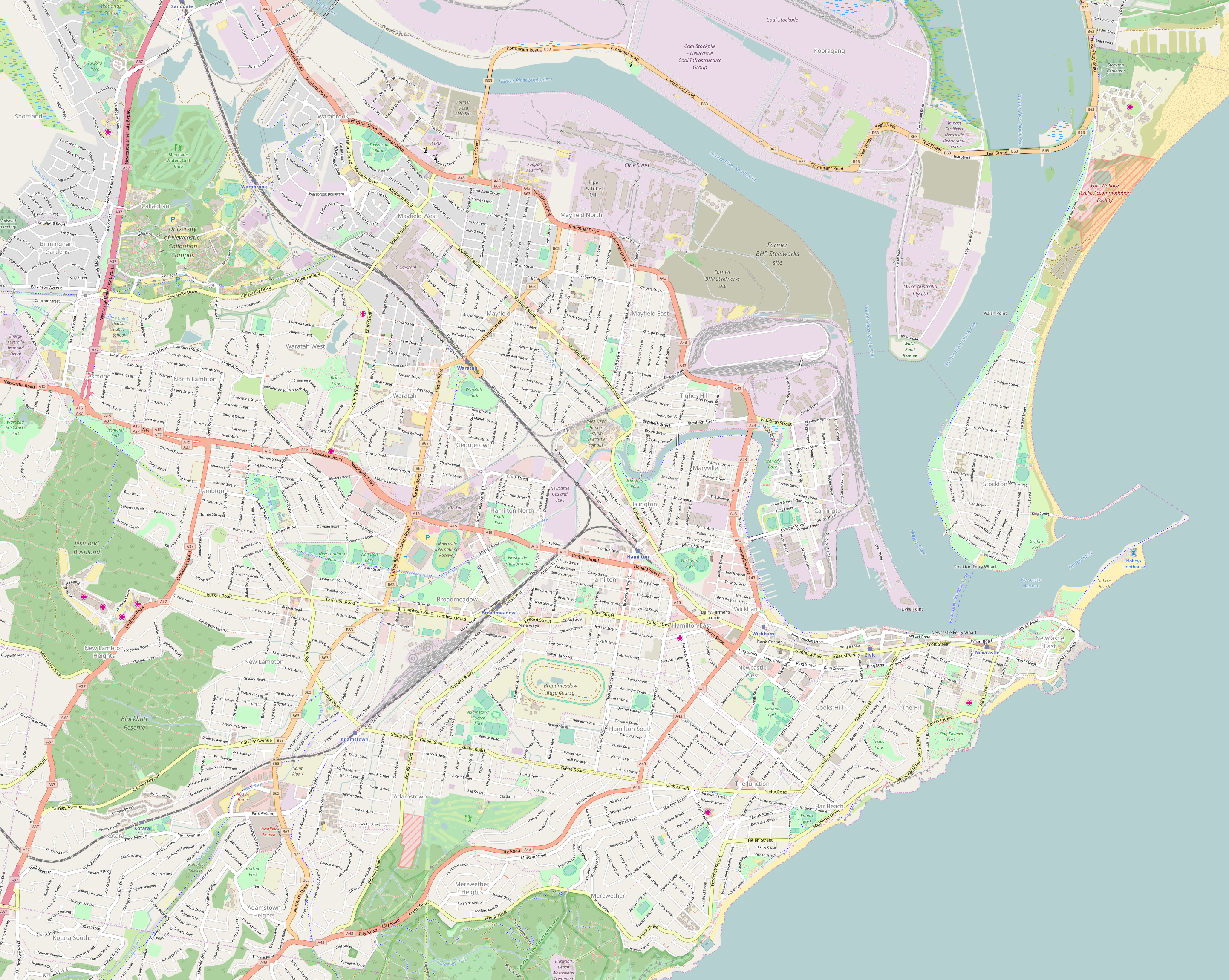
- Coordinates: 32°55′52″S 151°45′04″E
- Country: Australia
- State: New South Wales
- City: Newcastle
- LGA(s): City of Newcastle
- Location: 4 km (2.5 mi) WSW of Newcastle

Government
  - State electorate(s): Newcastle
  - Federal division(s): Newcastle

Area
  - Total: 1.7 km^{2} (0.66 sq mi)

Population
  - Total(s): 4,057 (SAL 2021)
- Postcode: 2303
- Parish: Newcastle
Suburbs around Hamilton South
Hamilton	Hamilton East	Newcastle West
Broadmeadow	Hamilton South	Cooks Hill
Adamstown	Merewether	The Junction

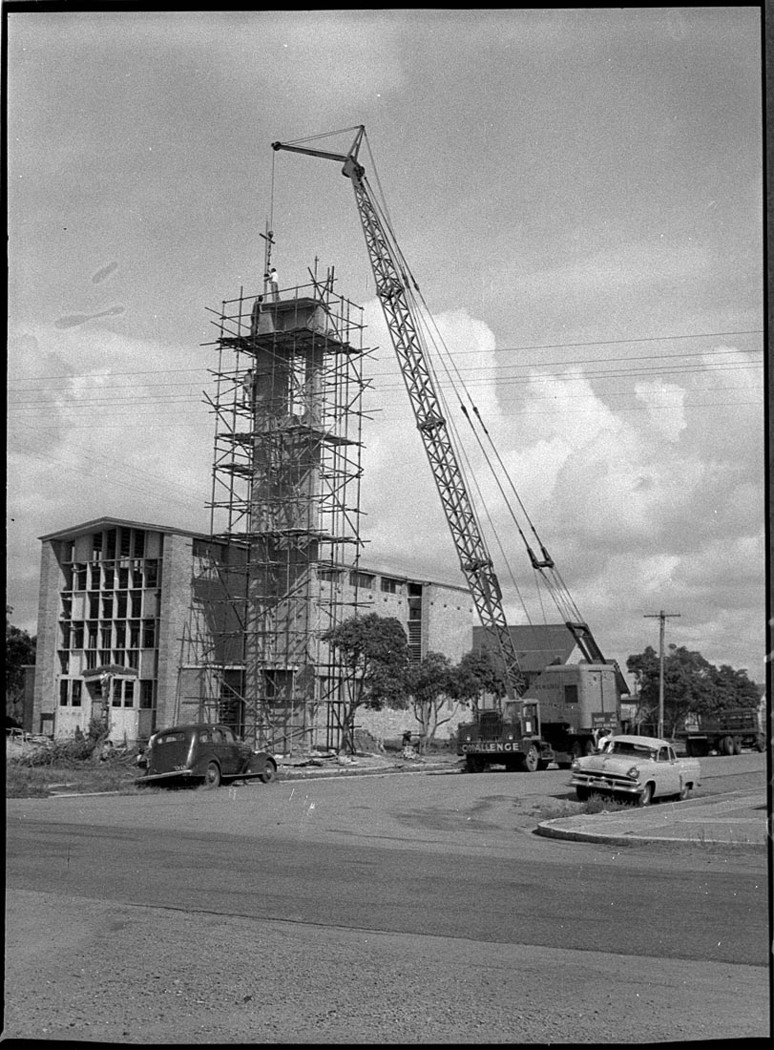
Anglican church under construction in 1957

Hamilton South is a suburb of Newcastle, New South Wales, Australia, located 4 kilometres (2.5 mi) west of Newcastle's central business district.

Hamilton South was part of the Australian Agricultural Company's coal bearing land in inner Newcastle. When mining ceased around 1910 it was decided to create a prestigious estate with an appeal to the higher end of the residential market. The suburb is characterised by late federation style housing. Examples of the design and architecture of the time still remain.

The suburb is serviced by Hamilton South Public School, established in 1933 and contains a number of parks and playing fields, including Learmonth Park, Darling Oval and Henry Park.

== Population ==
According to the 2016 census of Population, there were 3,876 people in Hamilton South.

- Aboriginal and Torres Strait Islander people made up 3.4% of the population.
- 80.4% of people were born in Australia and 83.4% of people spoke only English at home.
- The most common responses for religion were No Religion 30.7%, Catholic 24.5% and Anglican 15.3%.
