= Merewether Heights =

- Suburb
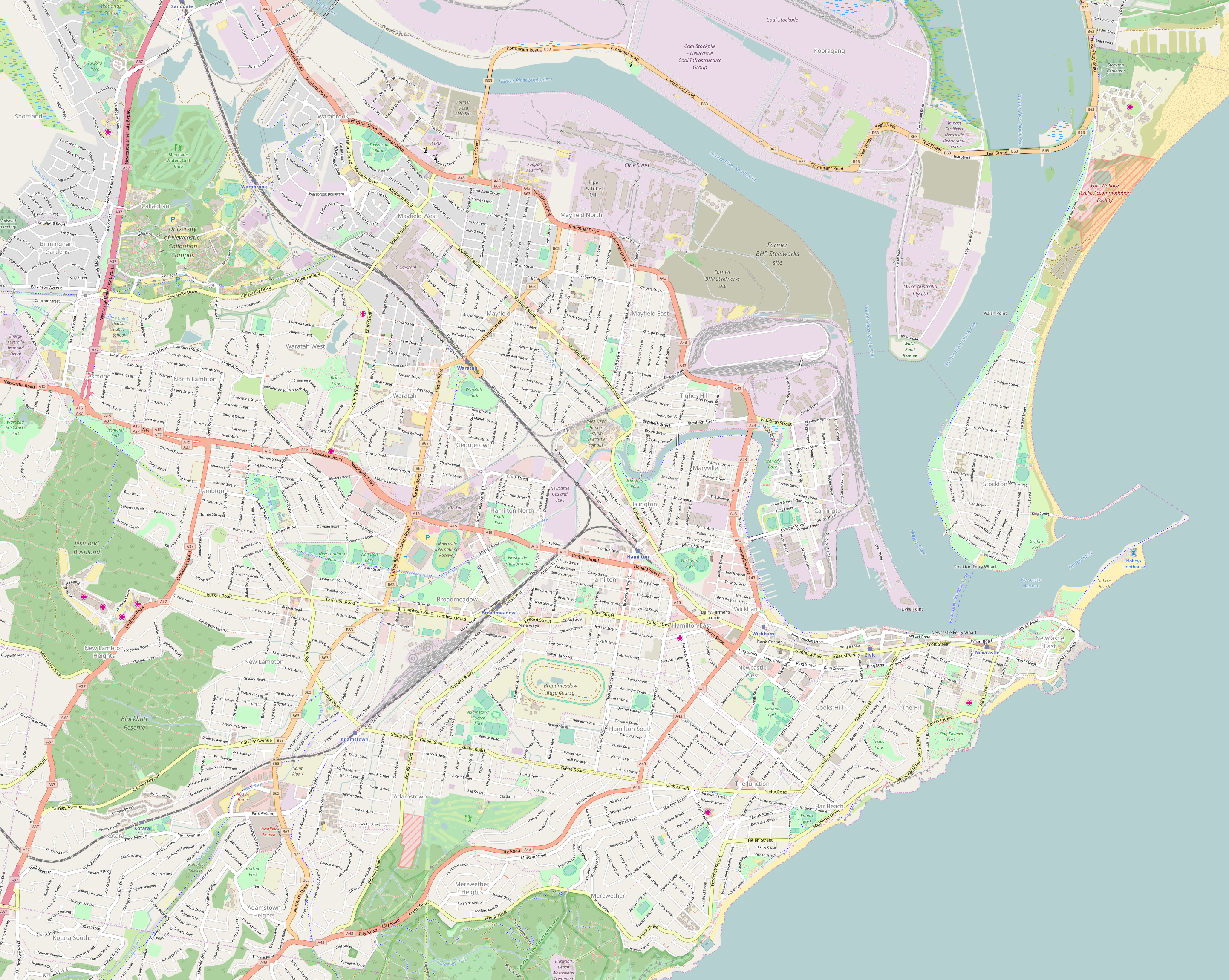
- Coordinates: 32°56′56″S 151°44′06″E
- Country: Australia
- State: New South Wales
- City: Newcastle
- LGA: City of Newcastle
- Location: 6 km (3.7 mi) SW of Newcastle; 5 km (3.1 mi) ENE of Charlestown

Government
  - State electorate: Newcastle
  - Federal division: Newcastle

Area
  - Total: 0.6 km^{2} (0.23 sq mi)
- Postcode: 2291
- Parish: Newcastle
Suburbs around Merewether Heights
	Adamstown, Merewether
Adamstown	Merewether Heights
Merewether

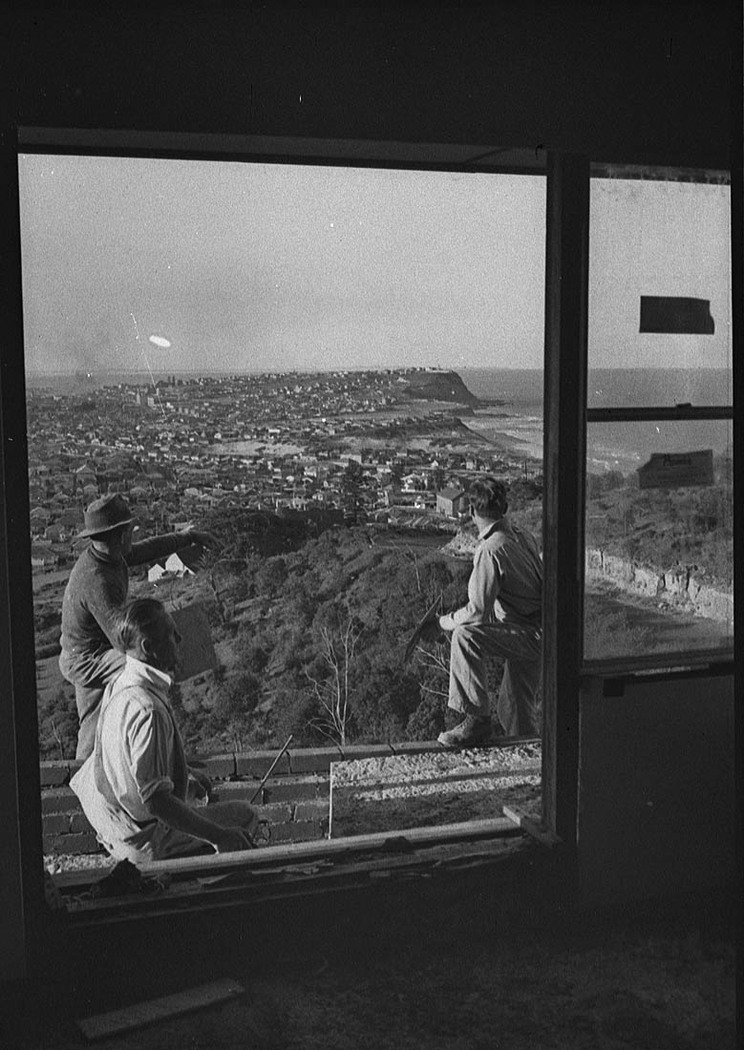
View of Merewether Heights in 1953

Merewether Heights is a suburb of Newcastle, New South Wales, Australia, located 6 kilometres (4 mi) southwest of Newcastle's central business district near the Glenrock State Recreation Area. It is part of the City of Newcastle local government area.
