= Hamilton West =

Hamilton West can refer to any of several different places, people, or things:

== Places ==
In Canada

- Hamilton West (federal electoral district)
- Hamilton West (provincial electoral district)
- Hamilton West—Ancaster—Dundas (federal electoral district)
- Hamilton West—Ancaster—Dundas (provincial electoral district)

In New Zealand

- Hamilton West, New Zealand, suburb of Hamilton
- Hamilton West (New Zealand electorate)

In Scotland

- Hamilton West and Earnock (ward), electoral ward
- Hamilton West, Hamilton, Scotland, neighbourhood
- Rutherglen and Hamilton West (UK Parliament constituency)

== People ==
- E. Hamilton West, bishop in The Episcopal Church
- Hamilton West (Nicaraguan footballer), Nicaraguan footballer

== Other ==
- Hamilton West (football club), Scottish association football club
- Hamilton West railway station, Scotland
- Hamilton West School, New Zealand
