= Merewether, New South Wales =

Merewether
- Suburb
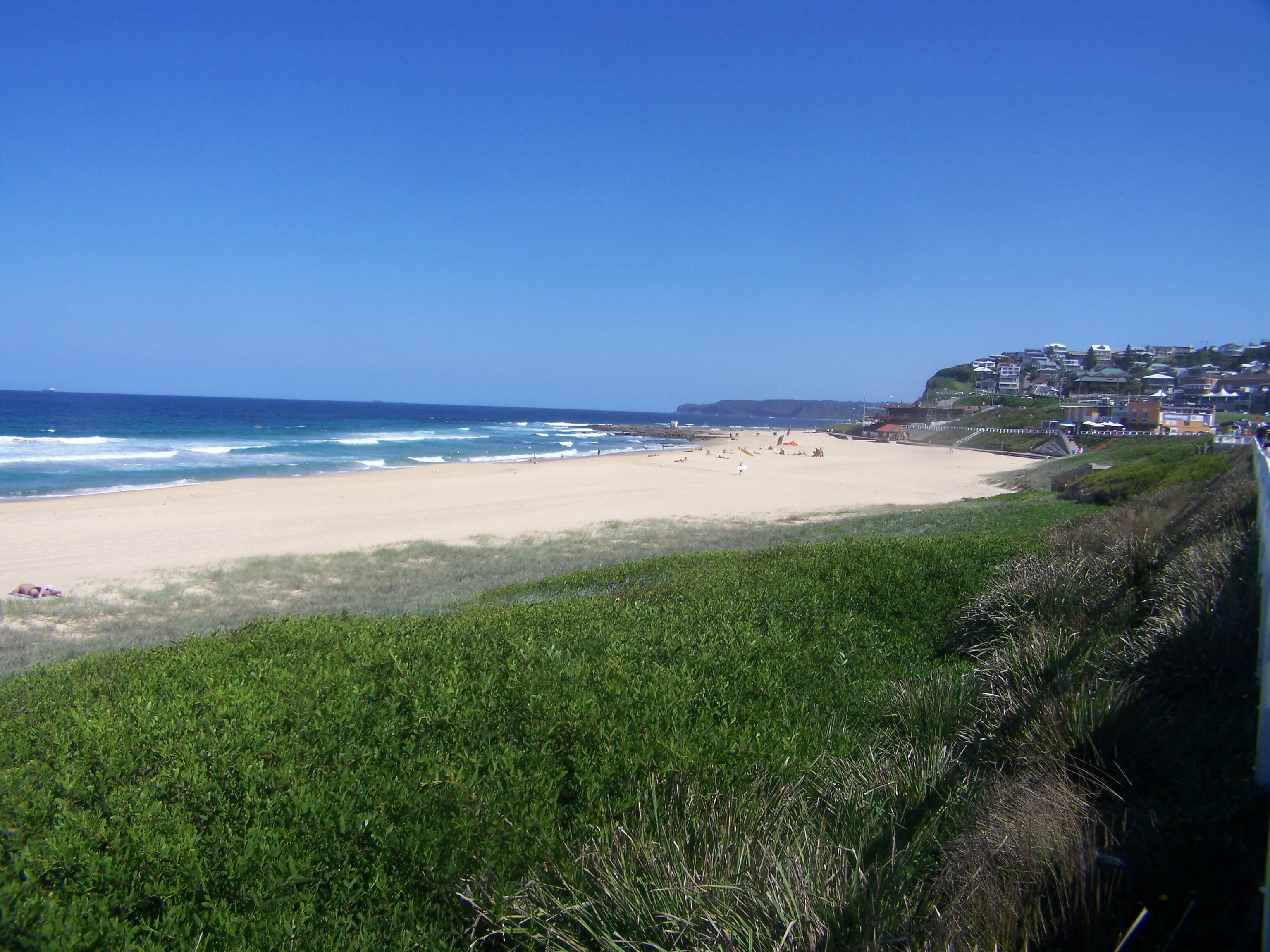
- Merewether Beach

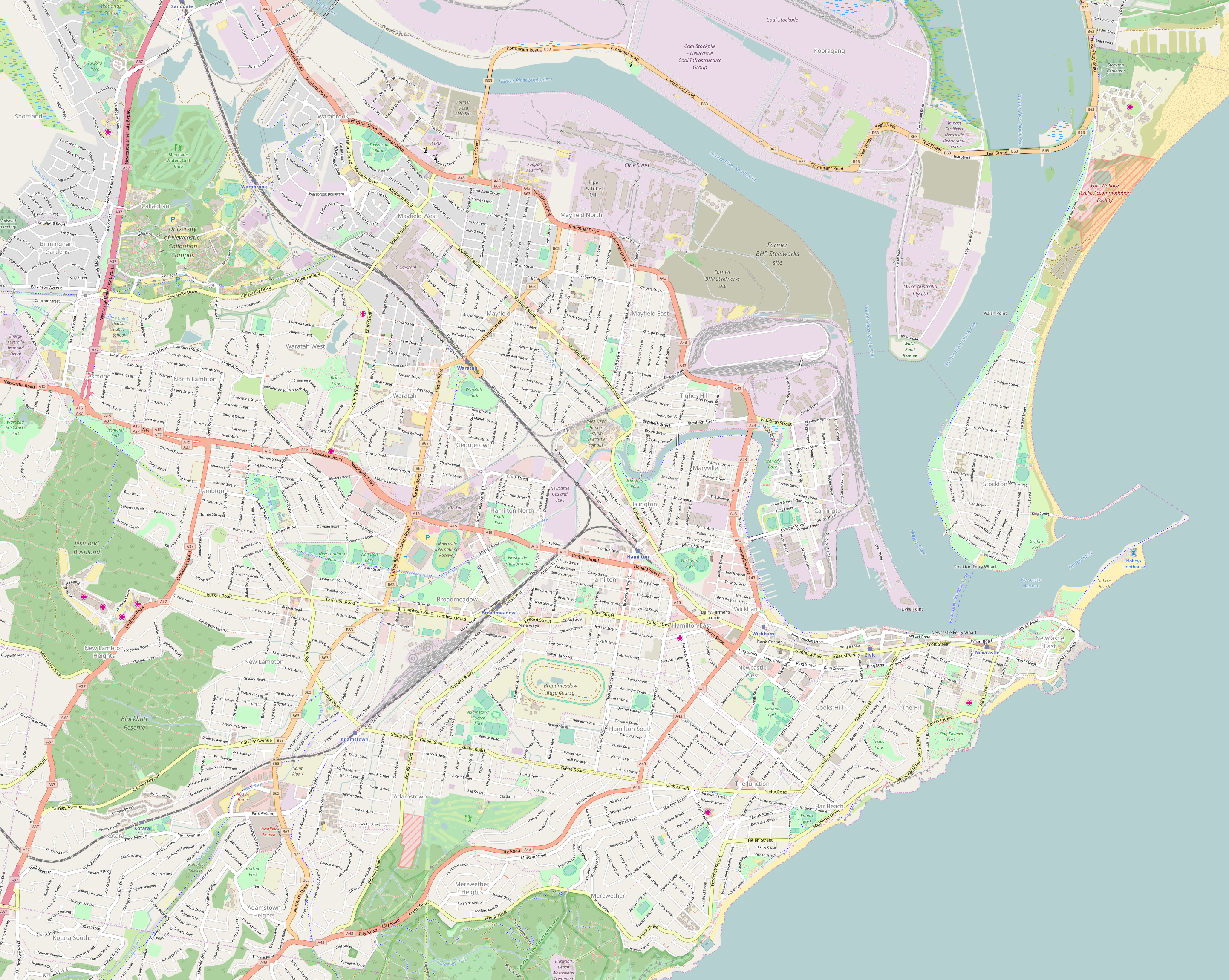
- Interactive map of Merewether
- Coordinates: 32°56′34″S 151°45′9″E
- Country: Australia
- State: New South Wales
- Region: Hunter
- City: Newcastle
- LGA: City of Newcastle
- Location: 3 km (1.9 mi) SW of Newcastle; 6 km (3.7 mi) ESE of Charlestown
- Established: 1890

Government
  - State electorate: Newcastle
  - Federal division: Newcastle

Area
  - Total: 6.1 km^{2} (2.4 sq mi)

Population
  - Total: 11,788 (SAL 2021)
  - Density: 3,049.4/km^{2} (7,898/sq mi)^{Note1}
- Postcode: 2291
- County: Northumberland
- Parish: Newcastle
Suburbs around Merewether
Adamstown	Hamilton South, The Junction	Bar Beach
Adamstown, Merewether Heights	Merewether	Pacific Ocean
Highfields	Whitebridge, Pacific Ocean	Pacific Ocean

Merewether (/ˈmɛrɪˌwɛðər/) is a former Municipality and today a suburb of Newcastle, New South Wales, Australia, located 3 km (2 mi) from Newcastle's central business district with a population of around 11,000. The suburb stretches 3 km (2 mi) from Merewether Beach in the east to Adamstown in the west.

== Establishment ==
Merewether was originally part of the Burwood Estate, and takes its name from the owner, Edward Christopher Merewether. The Anglican parish church is St. Augustine, in Llewellyn Street, the land and cost of erection met by Mr. Edward Merewether. It became the centre of a new Provisional District in the Diocese of Newcastle in 1890. In 1891 the Census gave the population as 4,700. Merewether was incorporated as a Municipality in 1885, covering 1,110 acres (4.5 km^{2}) and 31 km (19 mi) of streets. The Mayor in 1901 was David Lloyd, a funeral director who resided in Railway Street. In 1938 an Act of the New South Wales Parliament created a "City of Greater Newcastle", incorporating 11 municipalities into one local government area, including Merewether. The former Council Chambers, opposite the Post Office, became the clubhouse of the Australian Returned Services League.

== Industries ==
The dominant industry within the old municipality was coal mining, the biggest collieries being the two owned and operated by the Newcastle Coal Mining Company (who owned the railway). The last pits, Hillside Extended, Glebe End and Glebe Main, did not close until August 1954. They were served by the company railway which left the main Government line in the city centre, crossed the main Hunter Street, passed down the centre of Burwood Street, crossed Newcastle's Civic Park, passed under Laman Street and continued along its own permanent way through the suburb of Cook's Hill, to The Junction, past its school then up Merewether Street embankment crossing Llewellyn, Caldwell & Ridge Streets, past the telephone exchange, up Morgan Street, crossing Yule Road to the Newcastle Coal Mining Company's colliery complex. The Happy Valley Colliery (drift), opposite Rowan Street, and worked by the Maheen family, also closed about the same time.

Coal mining also took place to the south of Merewether at Glenrock Lagoon, and in Murdering Gully. Access to these collieries was via a private railway which ran from The Junction with the Glebe colliery line past Merewether Beach and through Australia's first two railway tunnels, built in 1861 & 1862 respectively, cut under Merewether Bluff, above the Ocean Baths. Old Burwood Colliery at Glenrock Lagoon was a deep shaft. Murdering Gully had Glenrock Colliery which comprised several drifts feeding a large coal loader above Burwood Beach. After being idle for a decade, in 1901 it was purchased by Messrs. Foreshaw, and Thomas Howley (1855–1942) who began new operations there in 1905. They installed electrical equipment for the first time in June 1931, and by the time of final closure 50,500,000 tons of coal had been extracted. It closed during March 1944 and the railway tunnels were sealed. Tenders called for the sale of all equipment at the colliery between August to November 1944, and the railway line from The Junction up the centre of Watkins Street to the first tunnel was lifted in 1946. The whole area is now part of the Glenrock State Conservation Area.

Merewether also once had extensive pottery works and brickyards, the last to close being Hughes' Pottery, opposite The Junction Demonstration School, in the last two decades of the 20th century.

Newcastle Coal Company's Colliery at the Glebe, c1900.

Coal-loader for Glenrock Colliery, Murdering Gully, Merewether, closed March 1944.

The last loaded coal train leaves the Glebe and is about to cross Yule Road, 24 Aug 1954.

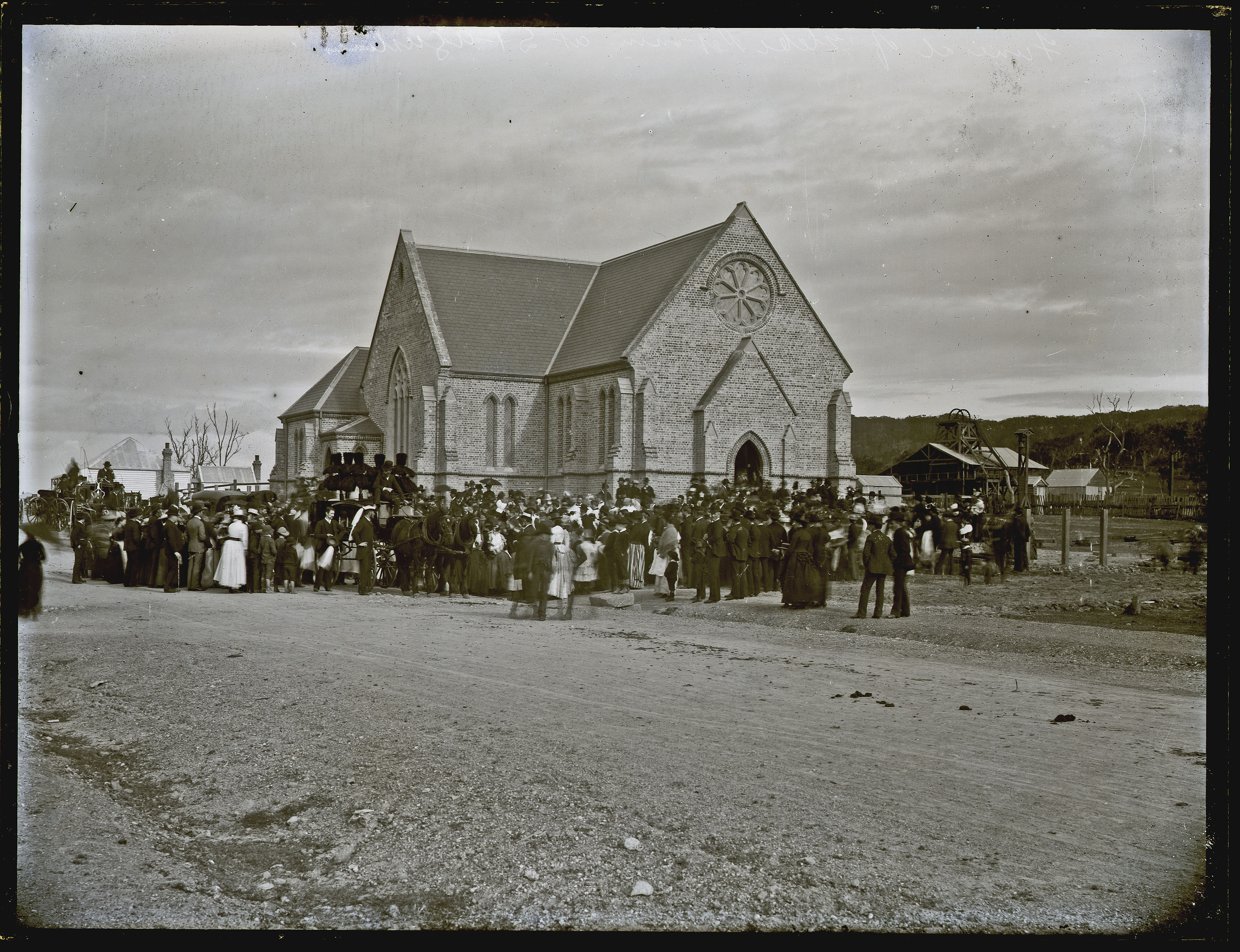
Funeral of Glebe Pit men, St Augustine's Church, Merewether, 3 July 1889

== Beaches ==
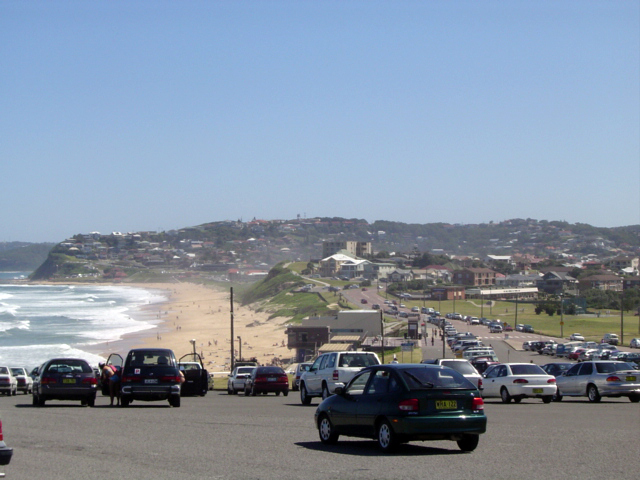
Looking towards Merewether's beaches, taken from above Bar Beach looking south.

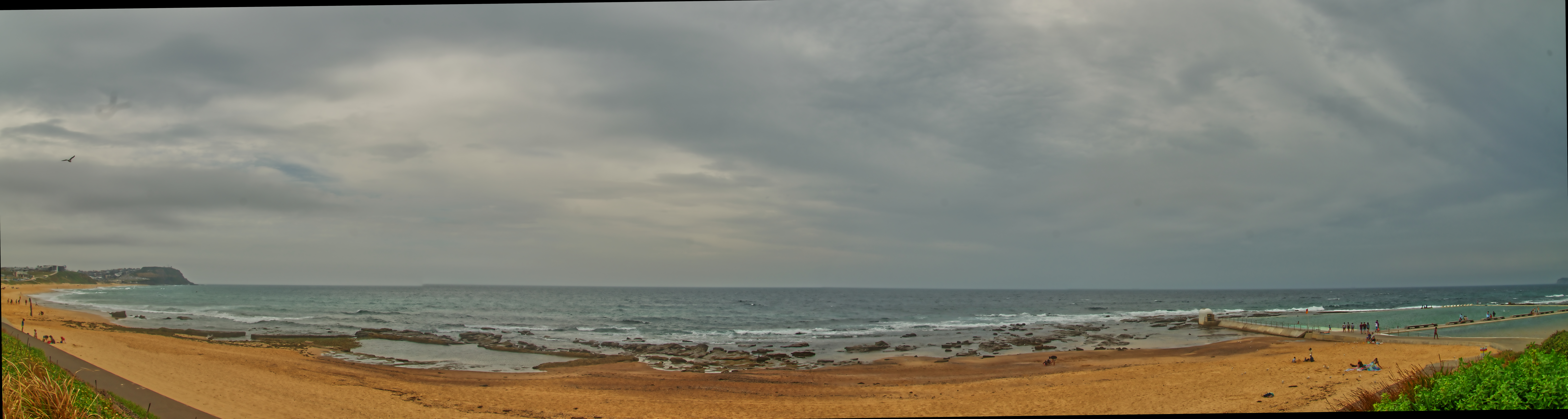
Panorama of Merewether Beach on 9 Mar 2019

The suburb of Merewether includes some of Newcastle's most famous beaches. Dixon Park Beach leads south onto Merewether Beach and a little further to the more isolated Burwood Beach which leads to Glenrock Lagoon. At the southern end of Merewether Beach are the Merewether Ocean Baths, the largest ocean baths in the Southern Hemisphere. Merewether Beach is home to Merewether SLSC the oldest lifesaving club in the Hunter Region and the Merewether Surfboard Club the most successful boardriders club in Australia.

In 2006, organisers of Newcastle Surfest announced that the competition would be moving from Newcastle Beach to Merewether Beach, in order to capitalise on the beaches superior surfing conditions, caused by the rock bottom of the beach, compared to the mud bottom of Newcastle Beach.

Professional Surfer Mark Richards is a resident of Merewether.

== Education ==
Earthquake damage to The Junction School, April 1990.

The Junction School, 1960, before most of it was destroyed in the Dec 1989 earthquake. Left is the Infants School, centre the Girls' School, and right, the Boys' School.

There are three primary schools in the suburb – Merewether Public School in Henry Street at the Glebe, the Catholic Holy Family Primary School in Janet Street, and Hamilton South Public School which is actually located within the Merewether postcode area on Kenrick Street. Two more, Merewether Heights Public School on Scenic Drive and The Junction Public School (founded in 1860) are located in Merewether Heights and The Junction respectively, on the borders that those suburbs share with Merewether. (The Junction only became a gazetted separate suburb in 1991). Pupils from the schools feed into the secondary schools of Newcastle High School, Kotara High School, The Catholic St Pius X College at Adamstown or the Anglican-affiliated Newcastle Grammar School. Merewether High School, an academic selective public school, is actually located 600 m (1,969 ft) from Merewether in the suburb of Broadmeadow.

== General ==
Opening of the new Merewether Bowling Club-house, 1967. L to R: Frank Brent, past President of the Northern District Bowling Association, Ray Simmons, NDBA President, and Wal Frost, Club President.

Merewether, once served by electric tramways to the city, and today by buses, has road connections to all sections of Newcastle and the major highways which serve it. Merewether's oldest mansion is Hillcrest, originally the residence of the Merewether family, which later became a private maternity hospital. It is today again a private home. Above it is the Scenic Drive with expensive 'modern' homes, which date from the late 1950s upwards.

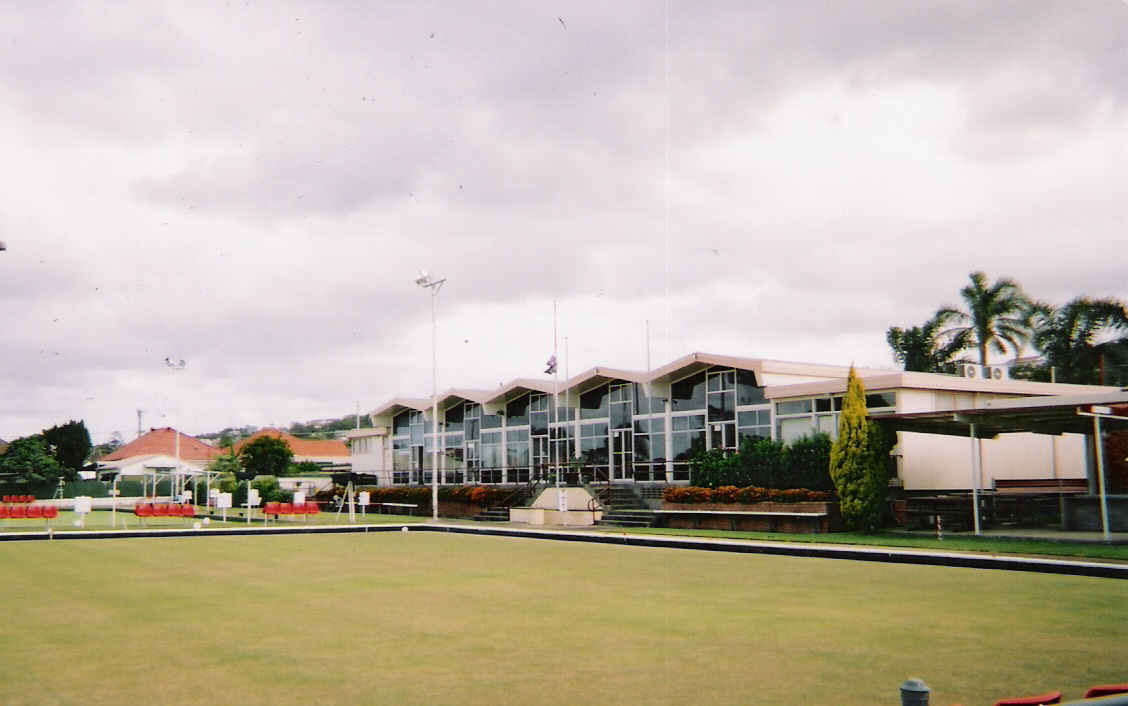
Merewether Bowling Club.

Following 18 months construction, Merewether Bowling Club, with one green, was opened on 6 February 1954 upon a long-closed old colliery west of the railway line, in Caldwell Street. Following the closure of the railway in late 1954 part of the land it occupied next to the club was purchased and another green established, and on Sunday 12 February 1967, Club President Wallace Frost opened the new club house which had cost $100,000.

The modern (built about 1982) Lingard Private Hospital is in the lower part of Merewether Street.

== Notes ==
1. Approximately 44% of Merewether is uninhabited bushland that forms part of the Glenrock State Conservation Area. The density figure represents the average population density in the populated area of the suburb.

== Bibliography ==
- Newcastle - 150 Years, edited by Eric Lingard, Newcastle, 1947.
- The Diocese of Newcastle, by A.P.Elkin, Sydney, 1955.
- Federal Directory of Newcastle and District for 1901, Newcastle, reprinted 1982, ISBN 0-9593518-0-9
