= Bar Beach, New South Wales =

Bar Beach
- Suburb
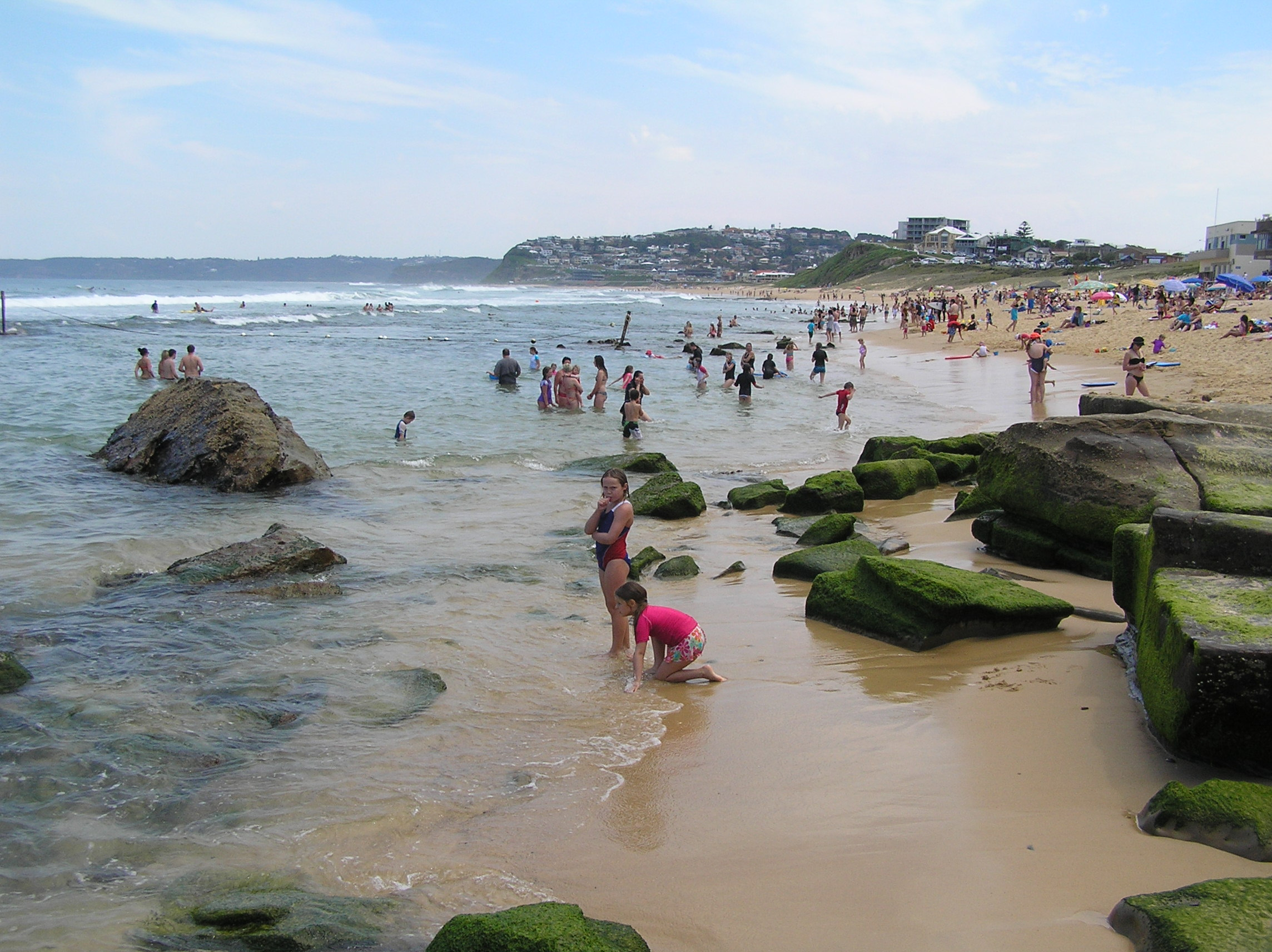
- North end of Bar Beach viewing south over the natural rock pool, toward Merewether

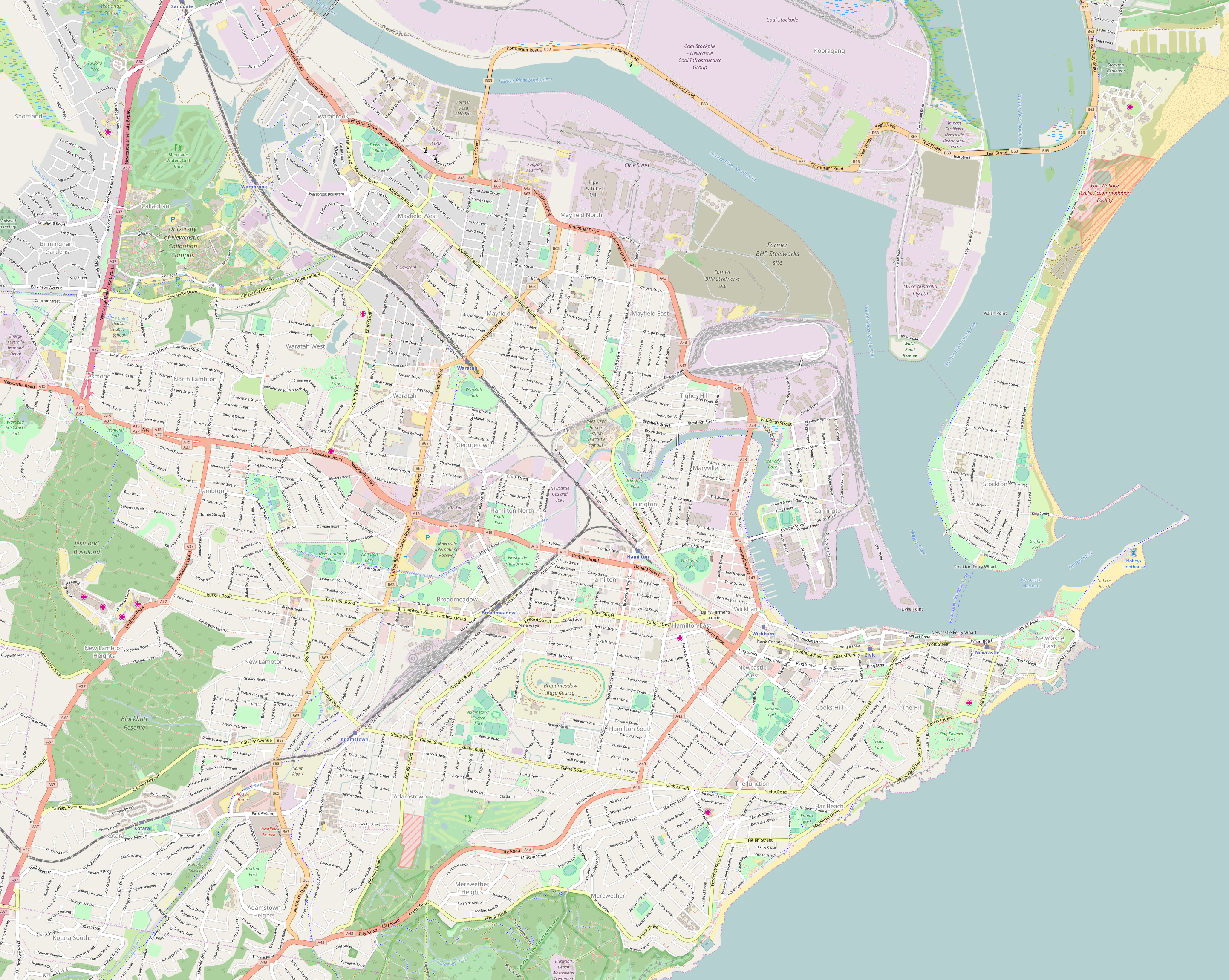
- Interactive map of Bar Beach
- Coordinates: 32°56′24″S 151°46′4″E
- Country: Australia
- State: New South Wales
- Region: Hunter
- City: Newcastle
- LGA: City of Newcastle
- Location: 1.6 km (0.99 mi) SSW of Newcastle

Government
  - State electorate: Newcastle
  - Federal division: Newcastle

Area (Note: Area calculation is based on 1:100000 map 9232 NEWCASTLE.)
  - Total: 0.5 km^{2} (0.19 sq mi)
- Elevation (Note: Bar Beach varies from 20 m (66 ft) above mean sea level (AMSL) in the west to 65 m (213 ft) AMSL on the cliffs overlooking the beach. This is the average elevation of the suburb as shown on 1:100000 map 9232 NEWCASTLE.): 35 m (115 ft)

Population
  - Total: 1,292 (SAL 2021)
  - Density: 4,155/km^{2} (10,760/sq mi) (Note: Almost half of Bar Beach consists of parks and beaches, which are located in the east, south and northeast of the suburb. This is the average density of the part of the suburb where the population lives, not the average for the whole area which is considerably lower at 2,244/km^{2} (5,810/sq mi).)
- Time zone: UTC+10 (AEST)
  - Summer (DST): UTC+11 (AEDT)
- Postcode: 2300
- County: Northumberland
- Parish: Newcastle
- Mean max temp: 21.8 °C (71.2 °F)
- Mean min temp: 14.2 °C (57.6 °F)
- Annual rainfall: 1,133.7 mm (44.63 in)
Suburbs around Bar Beach
Cooks Hill	Cooks Hill	The Hill
Cooks Hill, The Junction	Bar Beach	The Hill, Tasman Sea
Merewether	Tasman Sea	Tasman Sea

Bar Beach is an inner city suburb of Newcastle, New South Wales, Australia, located 1.6 km (1.0 mi) southwest of Newcastle's central business district. The suburb is named for the beach that extends along its eastern border.

The beach is home to the Cooks Hill Surf Life Saving Club.

== History ==
The Australian Agricultural Company held extensive Crown land grants in the Newcastle area that have since been developed into the modern day suburbs of Bar Beach, Cooks Hill, Hamilton and Broadmeadow as well as parts of the Newcastle Central Business District and The Hill. The Company released lots for residential development in Bar Beach in 1924.

A natural rock pool at the beach was named "The Bar" and Bar Beach took its name from that feature.

== Population ==
In the 2016 Census, there were 1,256 people in Bar Beach. 77.3% of people were born in Australia and 86.8% of people only spoke English at home. The most common responses for religion were No Religion 33.7%, Catholic 23.2% and Anglican 15.5%.

== Shipwrecks ==
The northern part of the beach is commonly known as Susan Gilmore Beach, named after the American clipper Susan Gilmore that was wrecked there in the early hours of 4 July 1884. Nearby the City of Newcastle (on 12 September 1878) and USS WST-1 (on 27 July 1945) were also wrecked.

== Heritage ==
The suburb has a number of local landmarks which have been heritage listed including the Cooks Hill Surf Life Saving Club and Memorial, Reid Park Tennis Clubhouse and Tennis Courts and the Empire Park Bowling Club Fence. A number of residential units in the Art Deco style have also attracted heritage listing.

== Gallery ==
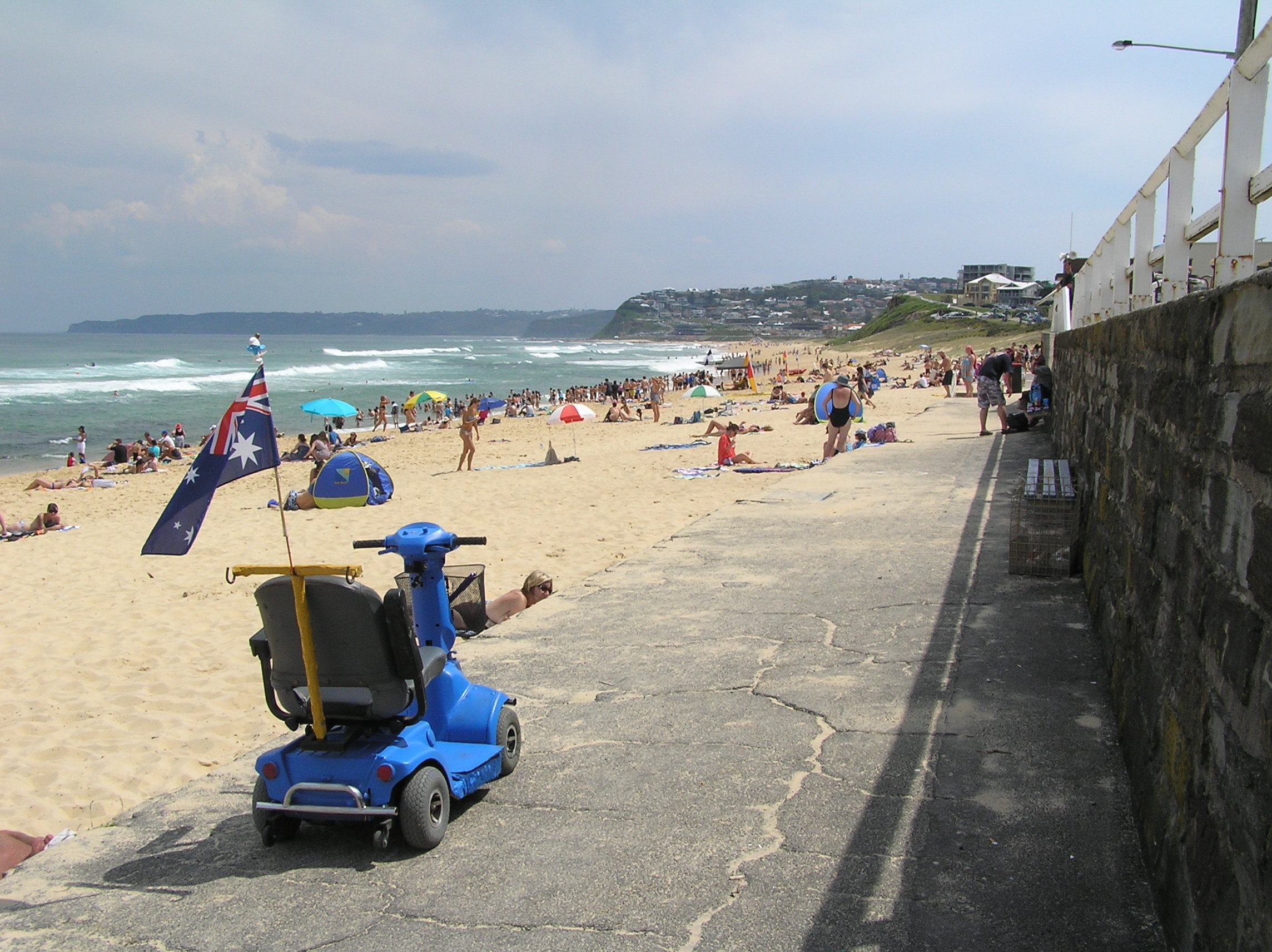
Bar beach viewing south

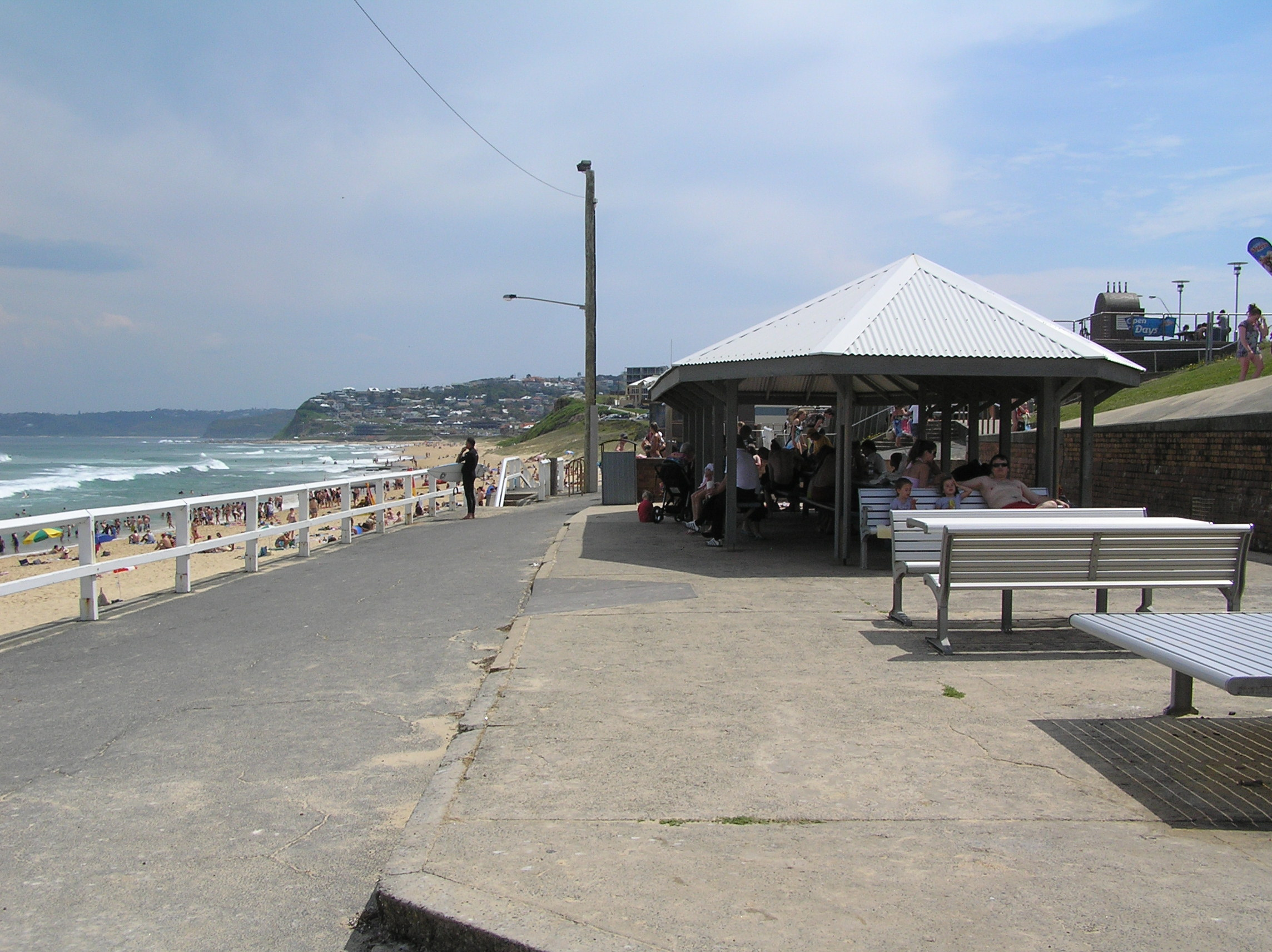
Bar Beach picnic facilities

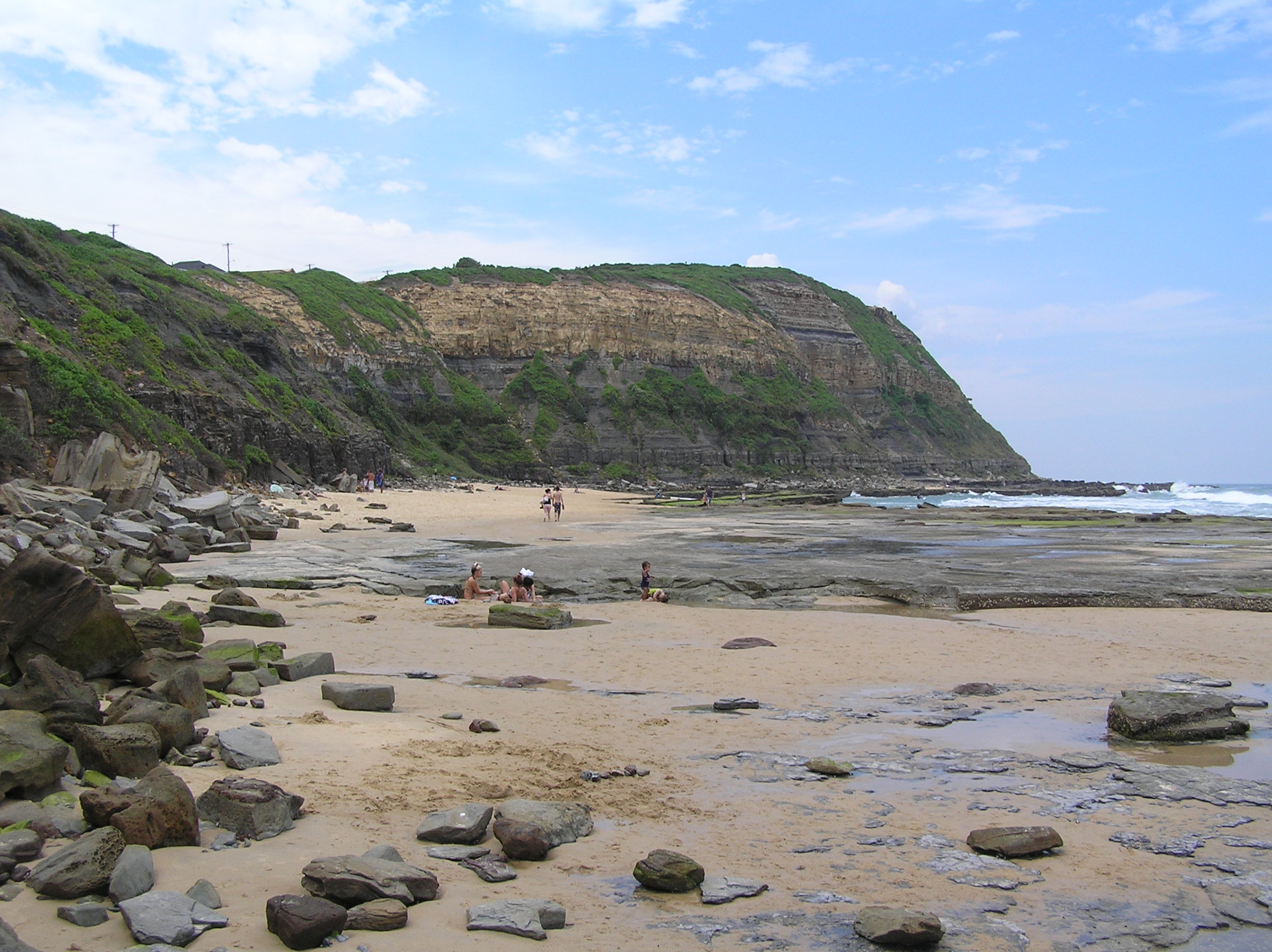
Viewing toward Susan Gilmore Beach from Bar Beach
