= Hamilton East, New South Wales =

Hamilton East
- Suburb
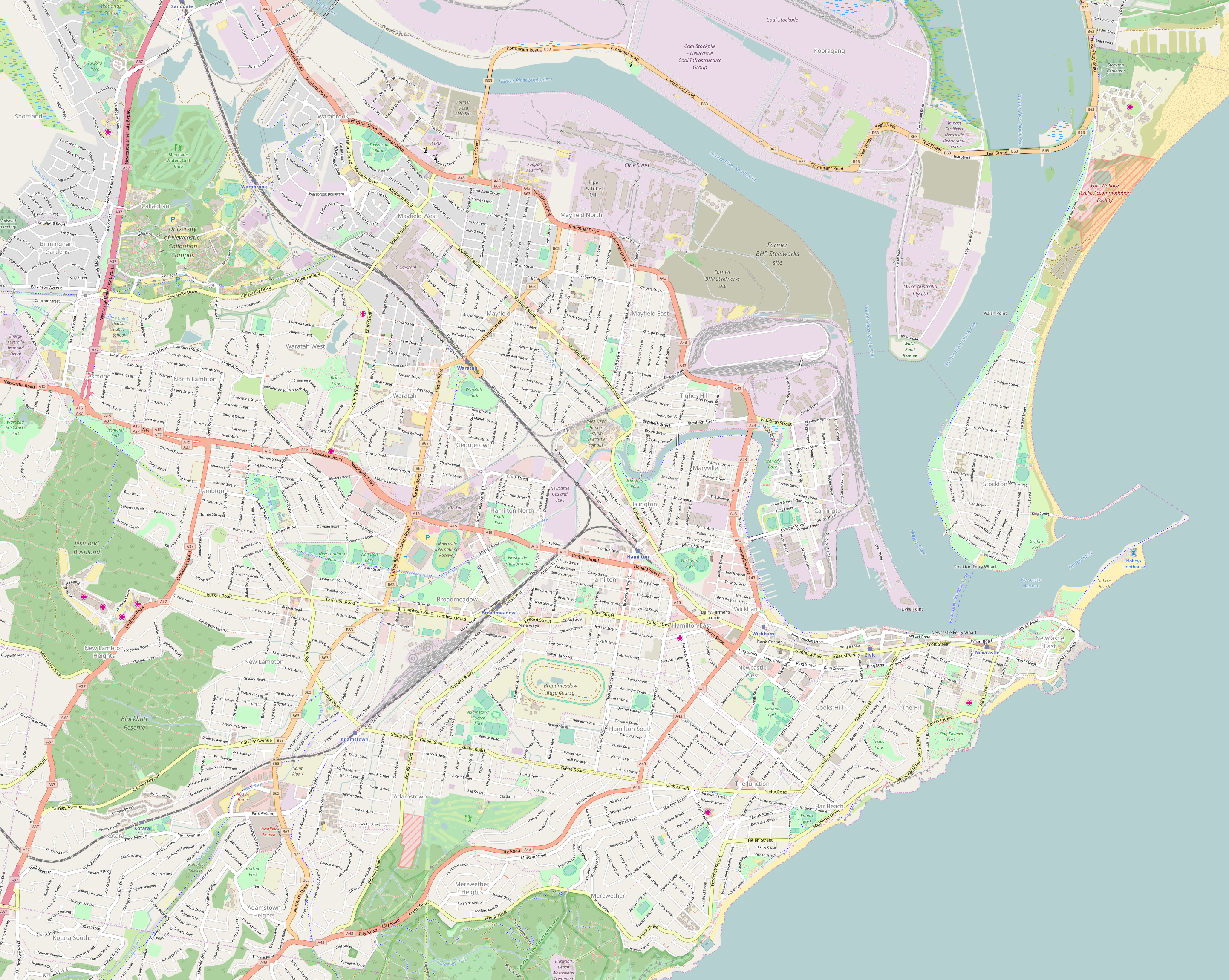
- Coordinates: 32°55′30″S 151°45′14″E
- Country: Australia
- State: New South Wales
- City: Newcastle
- LGA(s): City of Newcastle
- Location: 3 km (1.9 mi) W of Newcastle

Government
  - State electorate(s): Newcastle
  - Federal division(s): Newcastle

Area
  - Total: 0.5 km^{2} (0.19 sq mi)

Population
  - Total(s): 997 (SAL 2021)
- Postcode: 2303
- Parish: Newcastle
Suburbs around Hamilton East
Islington	Wickham	Wickham
Hamilton	Hamilton East	Newcastle West
Hamilton South	Hamilton South	Newcastle West

Hamilton East is an inner suburb of Newcastle, New South Wales, Australia, located 3 kilometres (1.9 mi) west of Newcastle's central business district.

== Population ==
In the 2016 Census, there were 983 people in Hamilton East. 85.3% of people were born in Australia and 85.8% of people spoke only English at home. The most common responses for religion were No Religion 36.0%, Catholic 26.2% and Anglican 13.9%.
