= Cooks Hill =

- Suburb
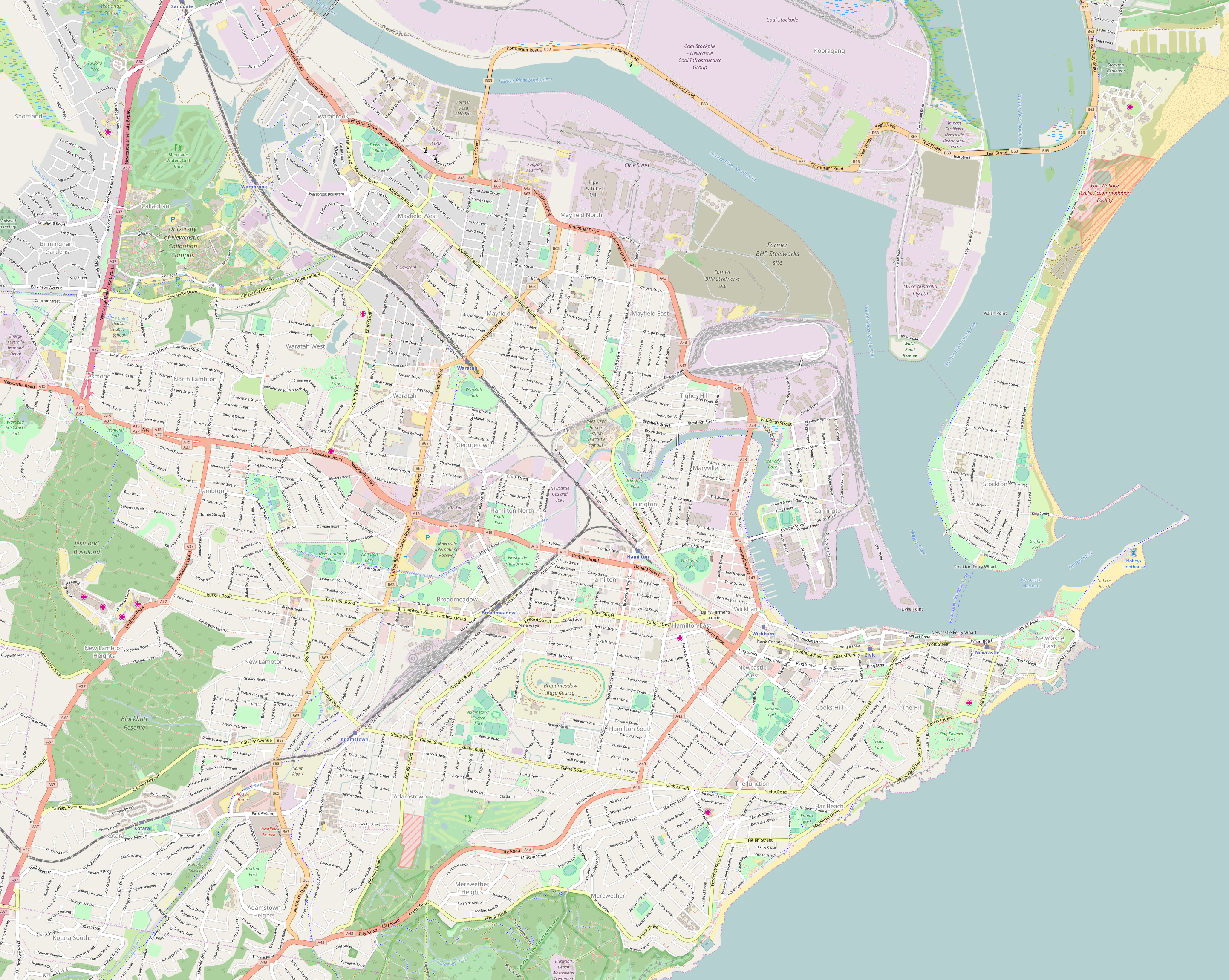
- Interactive map of Cooks Hill
- Coordinates: 32°56′02″S 151°46′11″E
- Country: Australia
- State: New South Wales
- City: Newcastle
- LGA: City of Newcastle
- Location: 2 km (1.2 mi) from Newcastle CBD

Government
  - State electorate: Newcastle
  - Federal division: Newcastle

Area
  - Total: 0.9 km^{2} (0.35 sq mi)

Population
  - Total: 3,774 (SAL 2021)
- Postcode: 2300
Suburbs around Cooks Hill
Hamilton East	Newcastle West	Newcastle
Hamilton East	Cooks Hill	The Hill
The Junction	Bar Beach	Pacific Ocean

Cooks Hill is an inner city suburb of Newcastle, New South Wales, Australia. It is typified by its tree lined streets, rows of Victorian terrace housing, turn of the century timber cottages and corner pubs.

Cooks Hill had a population of 3,621 in 2016. In 2021 the population had increased to 3774.

== Description ==
Cooks Hill is the home of popular "eat street" Darby Street. The street has approximately 25 restaurants and cafés, some of which enjoy alfresco dining. It is home to many of the city's well-known pubs, such as The Cricketers Arms Hotel, The Oriental Hotel, The Delaney, and the Commonwealth Hotel. Parry Street was named for the polar explorer Sir William Edward Parry who worked as a commissioner of the A.A Company in 1829.

The suburb is also home to the Newcastle Region Art Gallery and Newcastle Library on Laman Street. The Gallery houses many works by significant artists, including works by Sidney Nolan, William Dobell, Russell Drysdale and Peter Preston, and it is the custodian of a substantial public art collection.

Cooks Hill has a number of smaller inner-city art galleries, previously including the Von Bertouch Gallery founded by the late Anne Von Bertouch. It is believed it was the first commercial gallery outside a capital city in Australia. The area also hosts a visual arts scene and several artist-run projects, such as the Back to Back gallery that houses the Newcastle Studio Potters Inc.

The suburb is represented sporting-wise by Cooks Hill United FC and the Cooks Hill Rugby Union Football Club (the "Brown Snakes").

The Brown Snakes were established in 2007 as a youth-oriented senior Rugby club and have Empire Park, Bar Beach as their home ground.

Cooks Hill United FC plays at the Newcastle Athletics Field. All Age and Junior games are played at National Park Nos. 4 & No.6. The ZPL 1st grade team became inaugural Major Premiers of the new Zone Football League: Premier League Division, beating Morisset FC 1–2 in the Grand Final on Sunday, 18 September 2011, at Wanderers Oval, Broadmeadow. On Sunday 16 September 2012, Cooks Hill made it a '3-peat' when they won their third Major Semi final in a row beating Warners Bay 0–1 at Jack McLaughlan Oval, Edgeworth. The first win in the run of three started with the club having won the ID1 1st grade Grand final against Cardiff City FC at Warners Bay Oval, winning 2–0 on Sunday, 18 September 2010.

Newcastle Visitor Information Centre provides Cultural Precinct Guides listing all the galleries.

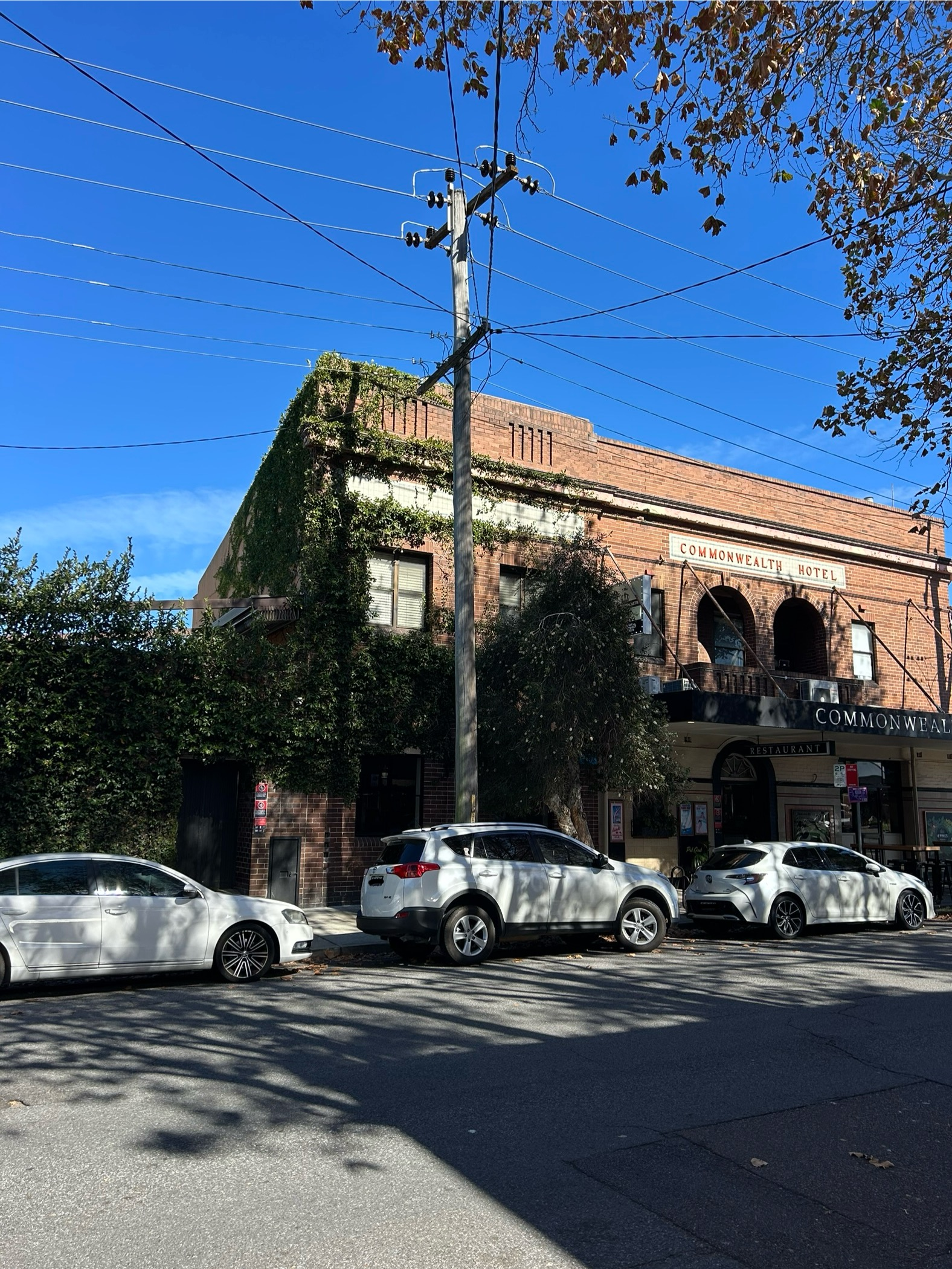
The Commonwealth Hotel - Cooks Hill 2026

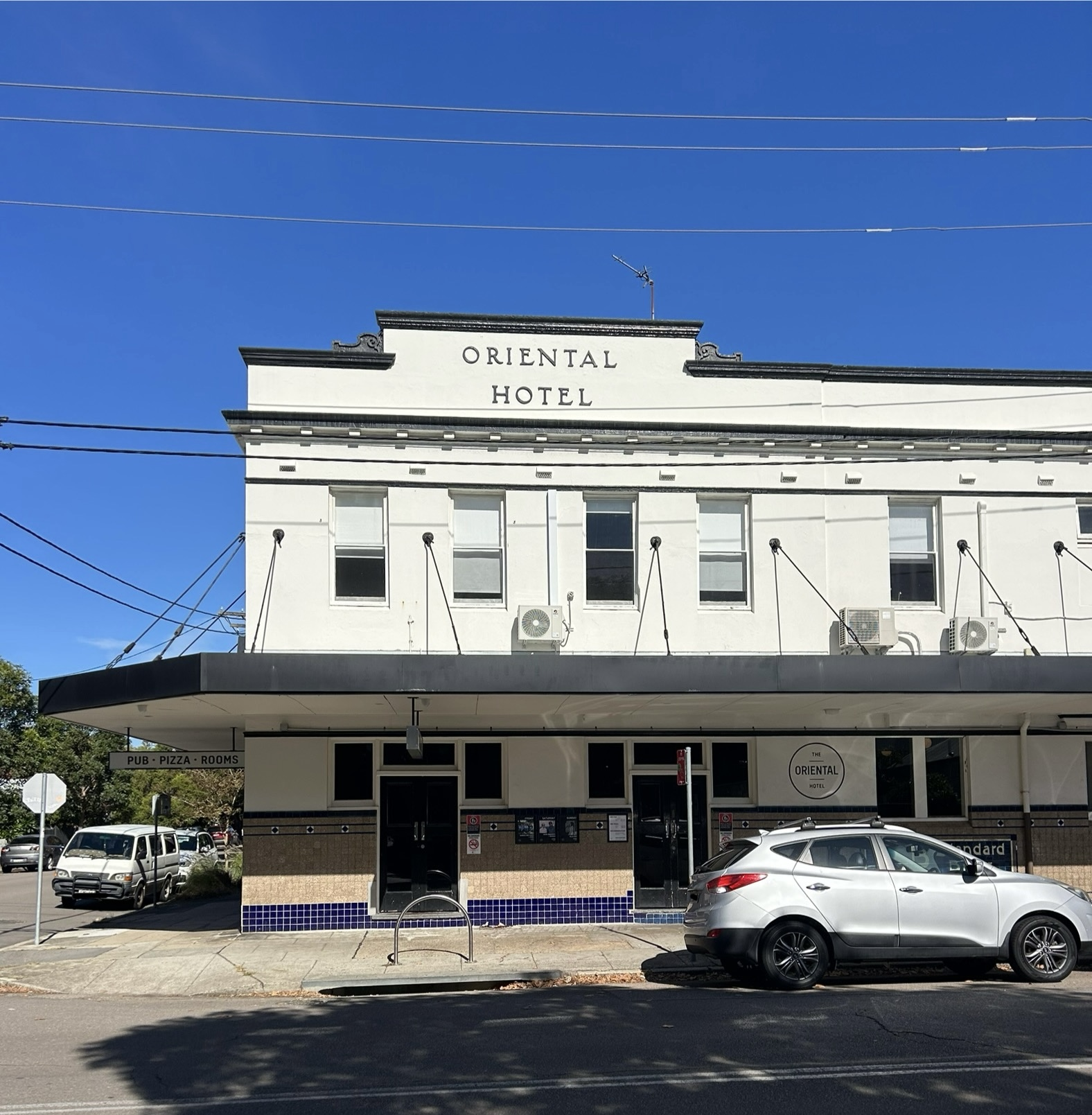
The Oriental Hotel - Cooks Hill 2026

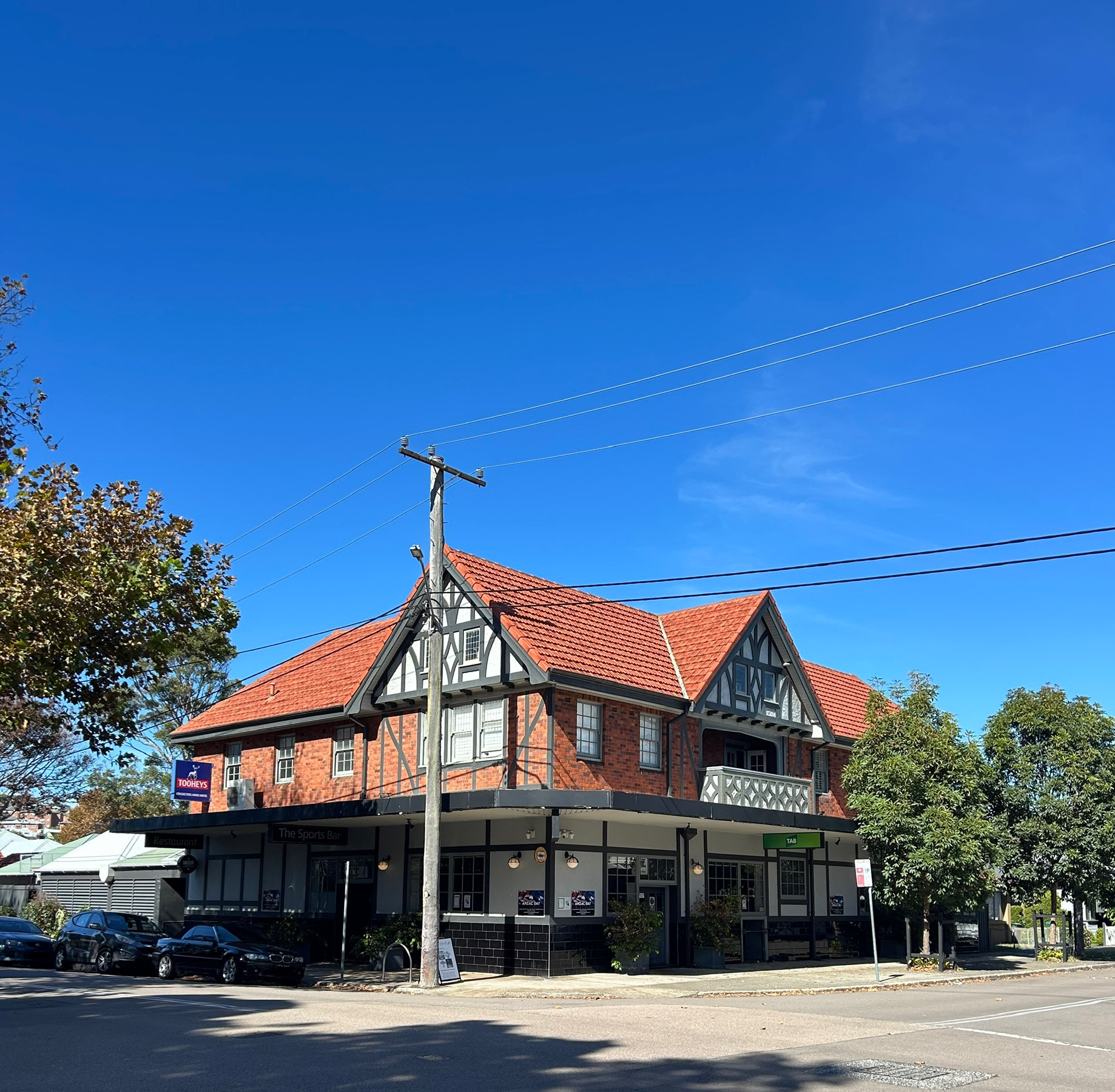
The Cricketers Arms Hotel - Cooks Hill 2026

== History ==
The Aboriginal people, in this area, the Awabakal, were the first people of this land.

Cooks Hill grew from coal mines in the area. Land sales developed from Brooks Street onto Darby Street to create the commercial centre there today. Darby Street was originally known as Lake Macquarie Road and was one of the few public access roads through AA Company Coal Mine land.

It was named after Samuel Wellington Cook, father of Thomas Cook, who was a wealthy landowner at Nemingha in the Tamworth area for some 25 years, on the Cockburn River, well known as "one of the most progressive farmers and stock breeders of his time". Samuel Cook was originally from Warleggan, Cornwall, England, a short distance from Lampen Farm, St Neot, home of the Dangar family. Samuel married the sister of Henry Dangar, Elizabeth Cary Dangar, moving first to Canada, then to Australia in 1837 with their son Thomas Cook, aged 3, at the request of brother-in-law William Dangar to manage the property "Turanville", Scone in the Upper Hunter. After this Samuel became a squatter in his own right firstly at Barwon, then Thalaba. He then exchanged the Thalaba property for 18,000 acres at the southern end of Henry Dangar's 25,000 acre Moonbi run, and called this holding Nemingha. The Cooks moved there in 1844 and their new home was called Nemingha House. Samuel Cook became especially well known in Nemingha, 5 miles from Tamworth, for breeding horses and was very prominent at the Tamworth Shows. Henry Dangar was Surveyor for the Australian Agricultural Company (AAC), and the original Tamworth settlement was wholly owned by the AAC. Samuel Cook remembered Tamworth as having "6 or 8 houses" when he arrived, and once the landlock controlled by the AAC was lifted by government legislation, he stayed long enough to help it develop into a thriving town. Cook owned shares in the Nemingha Gold Mining Company during the gold rush and is recorded as having "over 400 horses, 180 breeding mares, 5 stallions, and several stallion foals" described as "thoroughbred, crossbred, and English roadsters commanding the best price" on the Nemingha property. Cook patronised local businesses and helped to develop the Tamworth area. His spendings were said to be twice that of the vast Goonoo Goonoo Station owned by the AAC.

Their eldest son, Thomas Cook (born in 1834) moved to Nemingha with his parents and brother John (born at Turanville) as a child. He is reported to ride the 5 miles into Tamworth to meet the mail coach once a week. In 1854 Thomas became manager at age 20 of the same property that brought his family to Australia, "Turanville", Scone in the Upper Hunter, for his uncles William and Henry Dangar, and was soon placed in charge of all of William Dangar's grazing interests. Samuel and Elizabeth had two more children, William and Elizabeth, at Nemingha, but William died as a child in 1855 at Nemingha.

Thomas Cook married Charlotte Bentley Sibley, whose father was also from the same area of Cornwall as the Dangar's, in 1867. The next year William Dangar died in England in 1868, and Thomas Cook inherited "Turanville" at age 34, as well as "Drildool" and "Cubbaroo"at Burren Junction, "Merrywinebone", "North Oreel" and "South Oreel" in the Barwon district.

Samuel and Elizabeth sold Nemingha to John Gill, and after 32 years of success in NSW and a long association with the Dangars and the AAC, moved to Newcastle (Cooks Hill) in 1869 to retire to "Lucerna", in Lower Church Street, where Elizabeth died 9 years later on 18 November 1878, and Samuel followed her, dying after 14 years of retirement, on 2 March 1883.

Thomas Cook later donated stained-glass windows in St John's Church, Newcastle in memory of his mother, Elizabeth Cary Cook. "Lucerna" had views to the Northeast over Newcastle Harbour, on land now occupied by the Newcastle Conservatorium, Laman St, opposite St. Andrew's church [see reference for photo ]. Two years after Samuel's death, Cooks Hill School opened in 1885, formalising the name of the suburb. Low-lying ground and swamps were found in abundance locally; the market gardens near Marketown on Parry St. often flooded due to poor drainage into Cottage Creek, and so elevated land was of some value.

Cooks Hill was badly damaged when, at 10.27 am on 28 December 1989, Newcastle experienced an earthquake measuring 5.5 on the Richter scale, which killed 13 people, injured 162, and destroyed or severely damaged over 25,000 buildings, many of which had to be subsequently demolished. It was the first in Australian history known to claim human lives.

== Heritage listings ==
Cooks Hill has a number of heritage-listed sites, including:

- 1D Parry Street: St John's Anglican Church, Newcastle
- The Newcastle Baptist Tabernacle, 1861
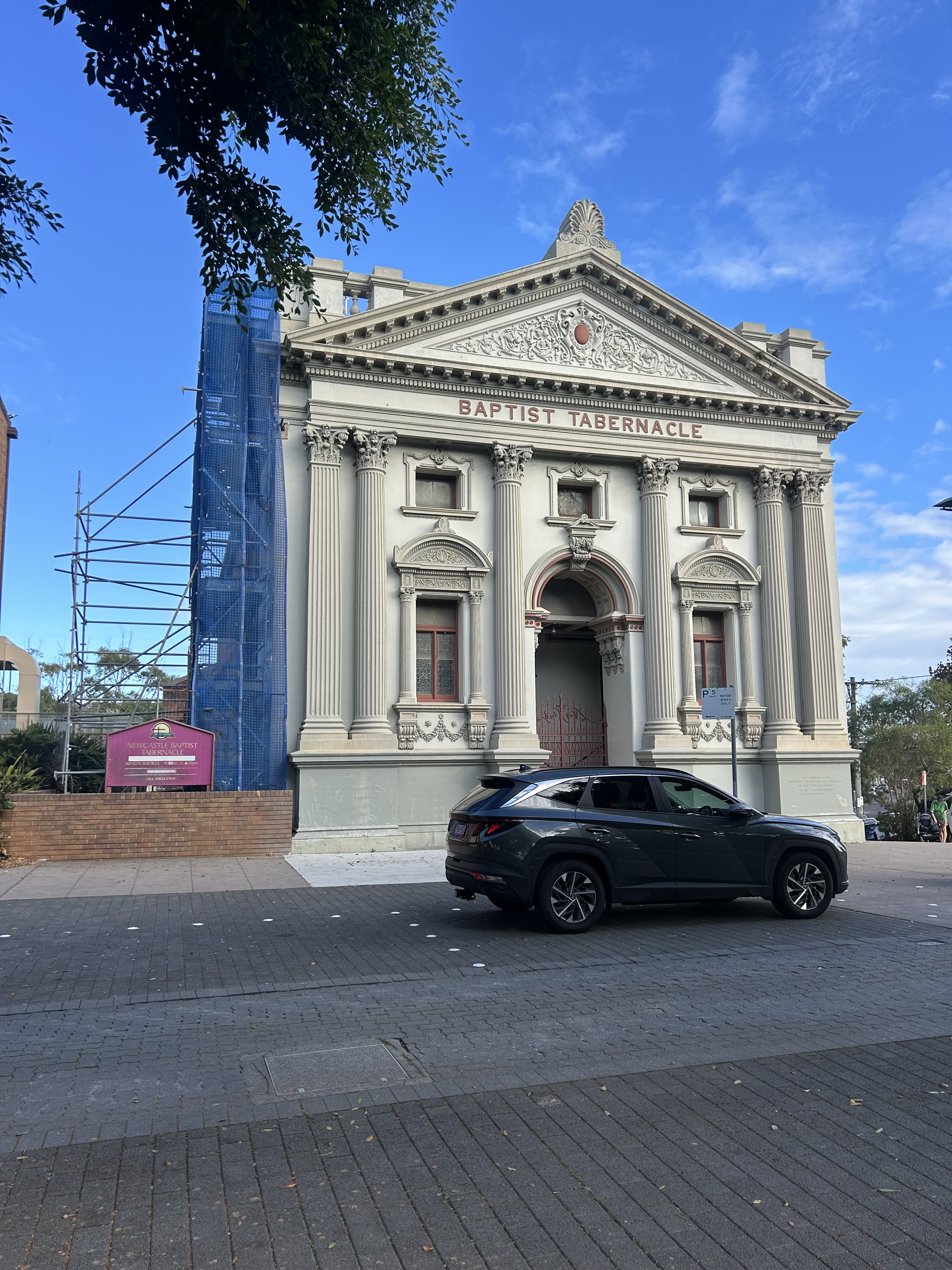
  Baptist Tabernacle - Cooks Hill 2026
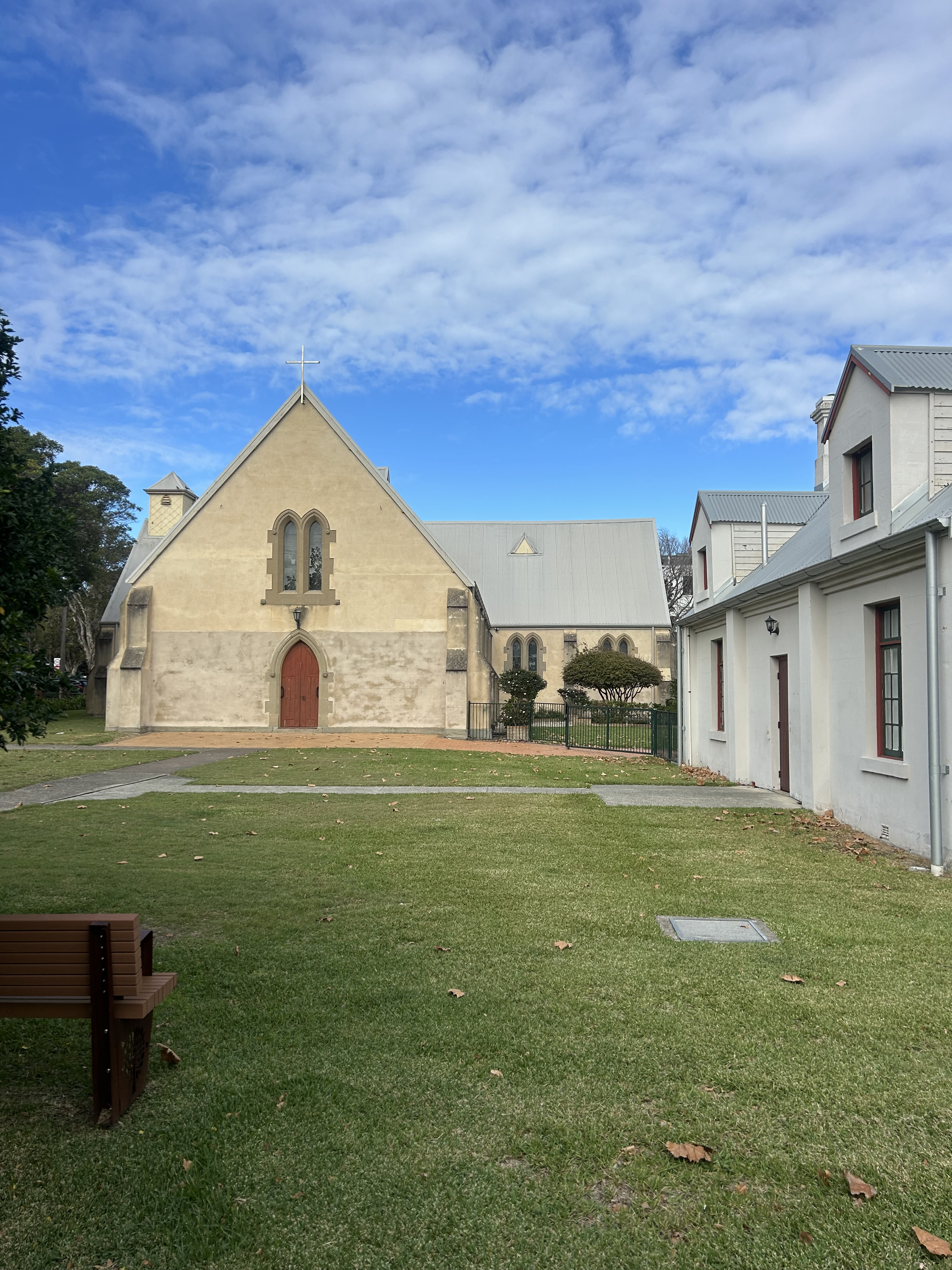
  St John’s Anglican Church - Cooks Hill 2026

== Population ==
According to the 2016 census of Population, there were 3,621 people in Cooks Hill.

- Aboriginal and Torres Strait Islander people made up 3.5% of the population.
- 80.3% of people were born in Australia. The next most common country of birth was England at 3.3%.
- 87.6% of people only spoke English at home.
- The most common responses for religion were No Religion 44.0%, Catholic 20.1% and Anglican 13.3%.
