= Merewether High School =

Location
- 130 Chatham Street, Broadmeadow, New South Wales; Australia; 32°55′47″S 151°44′7″E

Information
- Type: Government-funded co-educational academically selective secondary day school
- Motto: Latin: Scientia ac Labore
- Established: 1977; 49 years ago
- Educational authority: New South Wales Department of Education
- Principal: Rochelle Dooley
- Teaching staff: 70 FTE (2020)
- Grades: Year 7–12
- Enrolment: 1,071 (2020)
- Campus: Urban
- Houses: Baartz; Jensen; Norris; Richards
- Colours: Navy blue and sky blue
- Website: merewether-h.schools.nsw.gov.au

Merewether High School (abbreviated as MHS) is a government-funded co-educational academically selective secondary day school, located in the suburb of Broadmeadow in the city of Newcastle, Australia. It was established in 1977 following the merger of Newcastle Technical High School and Cooks Hill Girls High School. The school is named in honour of Edward Merewether, a prominent businessman and civil servant in the Colony of New South Wales who later became the Superintendent of the Australian Agricultural Company in Newcastle.

The school enrolled approximately 1,070 students in 2020, from Year 7 to Year 12, of whom two percent identified as Indigenous Australians and 25 percent were from a language background other than English. The school caters for students from a wide area within the Greater Hunter Region. The school is operated by the NSW Department of Education; the principal is Rochelle Dooley.

Merewether High students have consistently achieved some of the highest results in the Higher School Certificate, outperforming other schools in the Greater Hunter Region, with many students achieving state rankings in select courses.

== History ==
The suburb of Merewether is named after Edward Merewether, who began his working life in Australia as aide-de-camp to three Governors of New South Wales between 1842 and 1861. He was appointed Superintendent of the Australian Agricultural Company in Newcastle in 1861 and became a significant landowner and local benefactor. The school's E.C. Merewether Award for Creative Endeavour and the shield, which adorns the school's front foyer, were inaugurated in honour of Merewether.

From 1952 until 1976, the site, enclosed by School Street, Awaba Street, Chatham Street, Pokolbin Street and Melville Road, was occupied by Newcastle Technical High School. The school included an industrial arts block (now the covered outdoor learning area (COLA)), K Block (the library), two bike sheds (since removed) and a canteen (since pulled down and a new canteen built in its place). L Block was added in the 1960s.

The school merged with Cooks Hill Girls High School in 1976 to form a comprehensive co-educational high school, which drew students from the suburbs of Carrington, Wickham, Hamilton and Merewether. A building programme commenced just before the merger, with new blocks (A–D) being constructed, and blocks F–G being added later. The final principals of both schools are memorialised in the naming of the Bensley Hall and the Foley Library on the present campus.

Since 1989, enrolment is determined by an academic selection process. The school has a planned capacity of 1,080 students (180 from each year from 7–12). It first reached its enrolment capacity across all years in 2005.

Many buildings sustained severe damage in the 1989 earthquake, but were repaired thereafter. Another more recent event that affected the school was the floods of June 2007, which toppled trees and required the replacement of carpets in some blocks' lower floors, including K Block and the Foley Library.

In 2020, asbestos was found in the roof cavity of K Block, necessitating air monitoring and ceiling encapsulation works. The inspection of the building found that the asbestos levels were below detectability, allowing classrooms to remain in use.

== Selective high school ==
As an academically selective high school, Merewether High School takes enrolments through a statewide process. In the final year of primary school, students are assessed and enrolled by the school on the basis of their achievement across the curriculum and on the Selective Schools Placement Test. Only 180 places are offered for Year 7 students, with the minimum score required for admission in 2015 being 180. After the beginning of Year 7, students are placed into the selective classes by the college on a student-by-student basis.

== Extra-curricular activities ==
Merewether High School offers many extracurricular clubs and activities to its students, many of them musical ensembles, including: string ensemble, percussion ensemble, orchestra, jazz band, concert band, saxophone quartet, flute quartet, clarinet quartet, vocal ensemble and guitar ensemble, formerly facilitated by the honourable Brian Saxby BMus. Other activities and clubs at the school include an Envirogroup, Merewether Pride alliance, debating, Leo club, creativity and poetry club, puzzle group, Dungeons & Dragons group, chess club, art club, and robotics club.

Merewether High School has participated in Odyssey of the Mind since at least 1992 and have had many successes in this pursuit, including a team of Year 9 students winning the Ranatra Fusca Creativity Award in 2008.

The school has many various sporting teams including: cricket, association football, basketball (The Weathers), rugby union (Merewether Moos), rugby league, Australian rules football, hockey, netball, volleyball, rowing, aerobics team, water polo, tennis, table tennis softball and baseball.

Merewether High School regularly participates in the World's Greatest Shave, with several staff and students shaving their hair to raise money for leukaemia research. In 2021, the school raised over $78,000. In 2022, the school was able to raise over $100,000, the most of any school in Australia.

Merewether High School was one of the schools that competed on the Network 10 programme Shaun Micallef's Brain Eisteddfod.

== Notable alumni ==
- Tim Ambrose, former cricket player
- Manu Bennett, actor
- Chris Brown, veterinarian and television presenter
- Sarah Halvorsen, Australian rules football player
- Gordon Hamilton, director of The Australian Voices
- Erin James, actress
- Iain Jensen, professional sailor
- Harry Johnson-Holmes, rugby union player
- Sarah Kendall, stand up comedian and actress
- Justin Norris, butterfly and individual medley swimmer, bronze medal in the 200m butterfly at the 2000 Sydney Olympics and YouTuber
- Nathan Power, water polo player
- Anna Rose, environmental activist

== See also ==
- List of Government schools in New South Wales
- List of selective high schools in New South Wales
