= Broadmeadow =

- Suburb
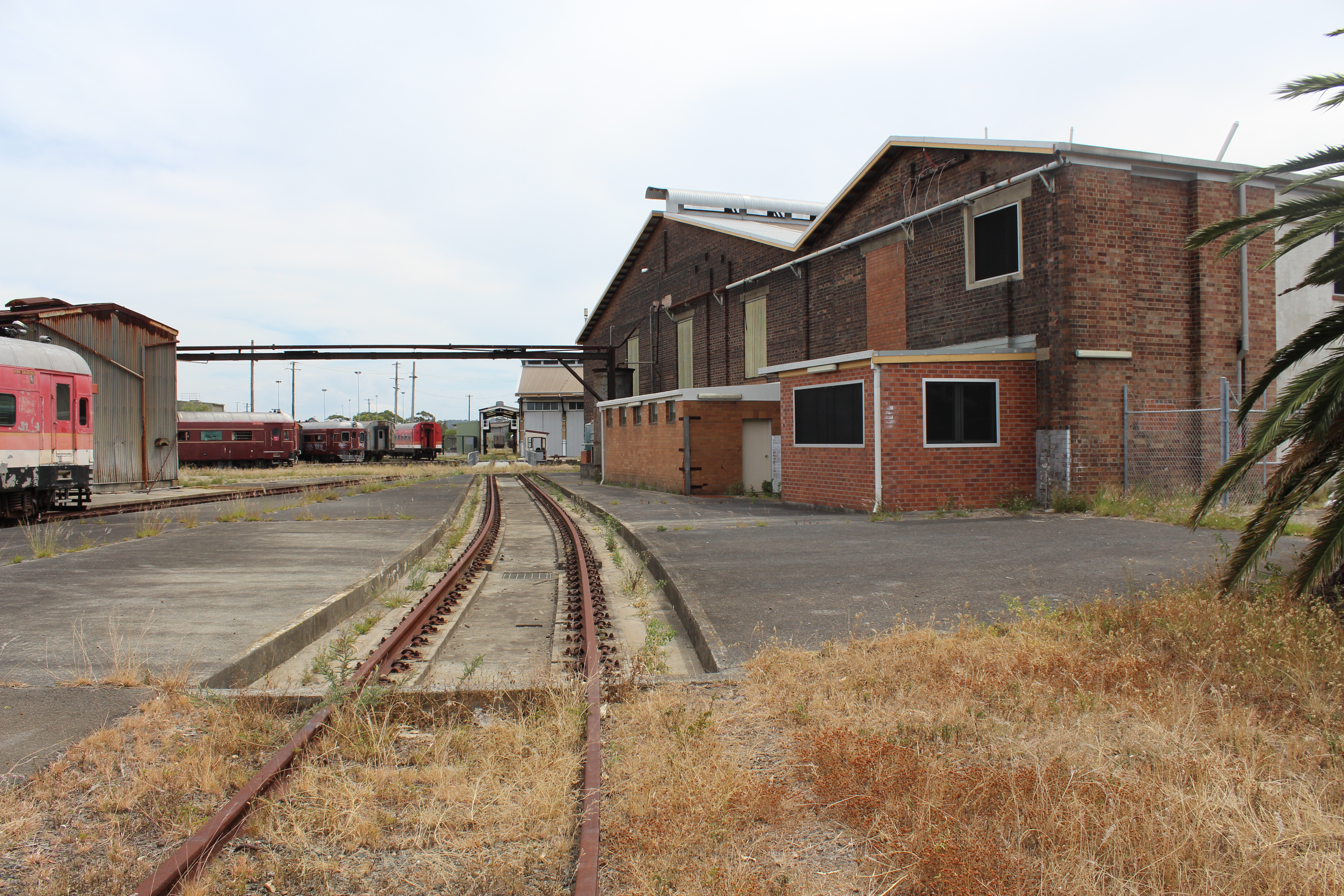
- Broadmeadow Rail Depot

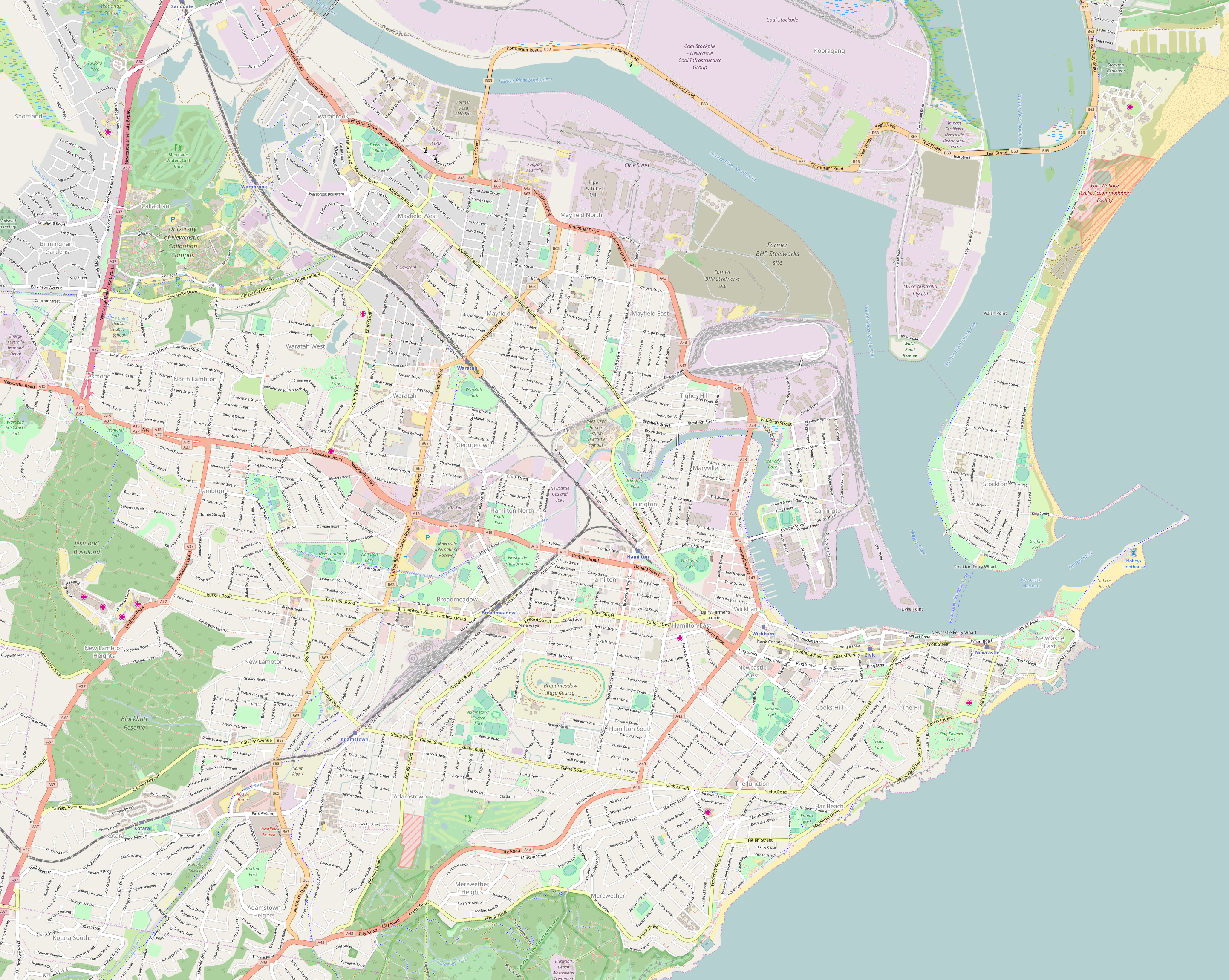
- Interactive map of Broadmeadow
- Coordinates: 32°54′54″S 151°44′06″E
- Country: Australia
- State: New South Wales
- City: Newcastle
- LGA: City of Newcastle
- Location: 5 km (3.1 mi) W of Newcastle; 7 km (4.3 mi) NE of Charlestown; 29 km (18 mi) SE of Maitland; 153 km (95 mi) NNE of Sydney CBD
- Established: 1880s

Government
  - State electorate: Newcastle
  - Federal division: Newcastle

Area
  - Total: 2 km^{2} (0.77 sq mi)
- Elevation: 10 m (33 ft)

Population
  - Total: 1,688 (SAL 2021)
- Postcode: 2292
- Parish: Newcastle
Suburbs around Broadmeadow
Waratah	Georgetown	Hamilton North
New Lambton	Broadmeadow	Hamilton
New Lambton	Adamstown	Hamilton South

Broadmeadow is a locality in the Hunter region of the Australian state of New South Wales. It is the geographic centre of the Newcastle city and suburban area. Its main commercial hub is located at the "Nineways". The locality is also home to the main depot and production site of the railway company UGL Rail, the Broadmeadow Rail Depot. At the 2021 census, it had a population of approximately 1,688.

== History ==
=== Origins ===
Broadmeadow was originally part of the Newcastle Pasturage Reserve of 648 hectares. It developed around the Great Northern Railway, the road to Newcastle's western suburbs and the construction of the Sydney to Newcastle Railway in the 1880s.

Nineways is a major intersection at Broadmeadow, originally constructed as a landscaped garden in the centre of a roundabout at the intersection of nine roads/tramlines that converge there, the area was later reconstructed to have a set of traffic lights connected to only four roads.

=== Railways ===
The Broadmeadow railway station is situated close by and, before the construction of the Newcastle Interchange at Wickham, was once considered as the site for Newcastle's official transport interchange following truncation of the Newcastle railway line. Between Adamstown and Broadmeadow railway stations there is a large marshalling yard that opened in 1938. Adjoining this marshalling yard was Broadmeadow Locomotive Depot which was the second largest steam locomotive depot in the state, and served the last mainline steam locomotives in service on the New South Wales Government Railways in 1973. The depot was then used for the stabling & servicing of Diesel locomotives until the depot was closed in 1994.

== Facilities ==
There are two high schools in Broadmeadow: Hunter School of Performing Arts, whose students have to pass a performance trial, and Merewether High School. The latter is the only academically selective secondary school in the Newcastle region.

Broadmeadow is home to the Newcastle Regional Showground, which holds the Newcastle Show and has the Newcastle Entertainment Centre, which hosts concerts and other large-scale performances. The Hunter Pirates basketball team previously played home games at the Entertainment Centre before being relocated to Singapore.

District Park within Broadmeadow has been the base of the Westpac Life Saver Rescue Helicopter Service since 1973.

Broadmeadow contains the Broadmeadow Racecourse, situated in Darling Street.

Broadmeadow Shopping Centre (formerly known as Newcastle Central) has a Spar supermarket and is complemented by ten speciality shops.

== Demographics ==
In the 2021 Census, there were 1,688 people in Broadmeadow. 78.5% of people were born in Australia and 81.5% of people spoke only English at home. The most common responses for religion were No Religion 50.4, Catholic 16.6% and Anglican 8.2%.

== Heritage listings ==
Broadmeadow has a number of heritage-listed sites, including:

- Premiers and Railway Commissioners Rail Car Collection
- Main Northern railway: Broadmeadow Railway Locomotive Depot
