= Georgetown, New South Wales =

Georgetown
- Suburb
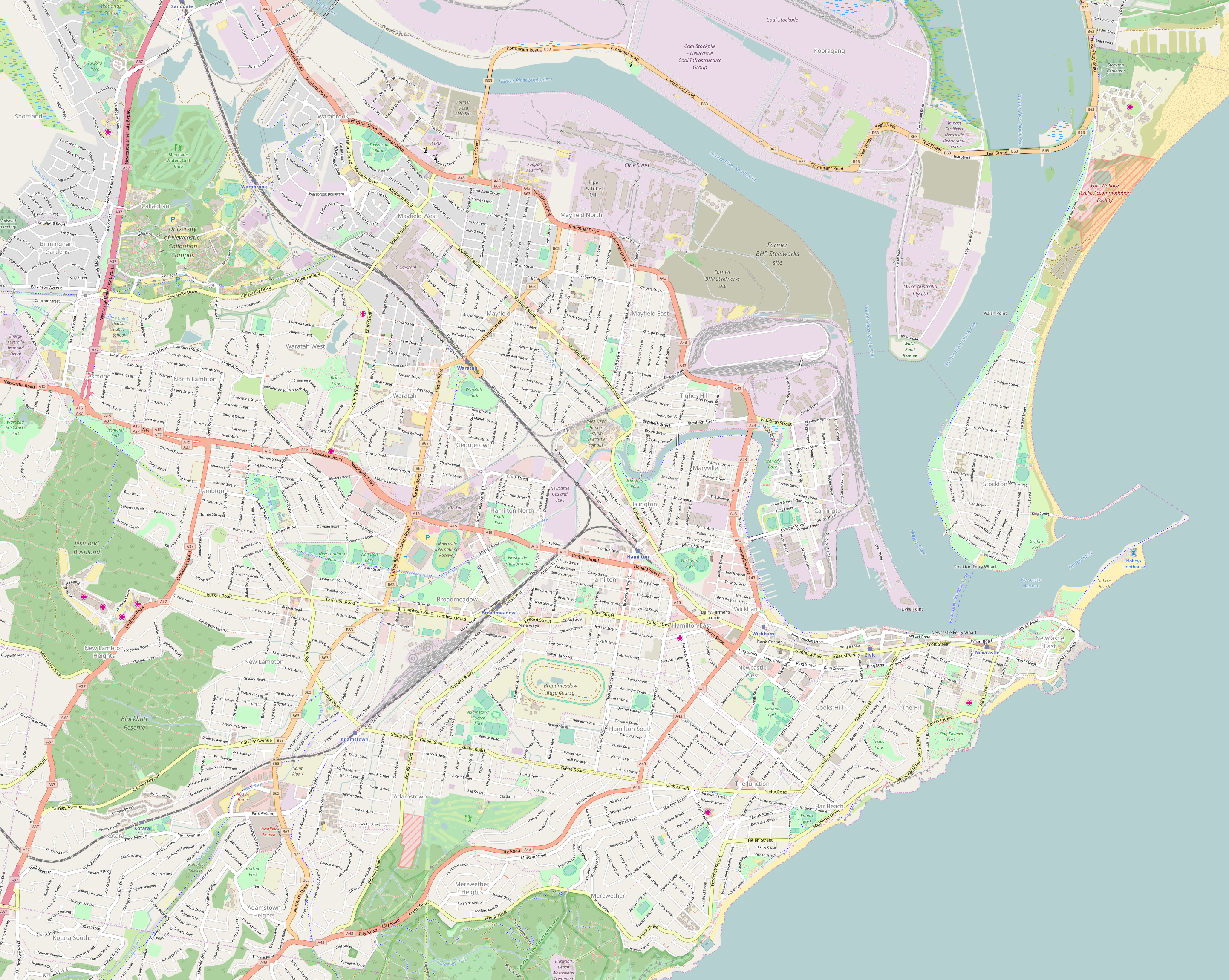
- Coordinates: 32°53′53″S 151°44′06″E
- Country: Australia
- State: New South Wales
- City: Newcastle
- LGA(s): City of Newcastle
- Location: 6 km (3.7 mi) WNW of Newcastle

Government
  - State electorate(s): Newcastle
  - Federal division(s): Newcastle

Area
  - Total: 0.8 km^{2} (0.31 sq mi)

Population
  - Total(s): 2,072 (SAL 2021)
- Postcode: 2298
- Parish: Newcastle
Suburbs around Georgetown
Waratah	Waratah	Mayfield
Waratah	Georgetown	Islington
Waratah	Broadmeadow	Hamilton North

Georgetown is a suburb of Newcastle, New South Wales, Australia, located 6 kilometres (4 mi) from Newcastle's central business district. It is part of the City of Newcastle local government area.

== Origins ==
Georgetown is named after George Moate, as is Moate Street in the centre of the suburb. Moate acquired land in the general area of Georgetown in 1853, which he subdivided into an estate. Georgetown began as a residential area for workers from industries like the Copper Smelting Works (Goninans) located nearby. By 1880, Georgetown was already described as a prosperous village.

== Demographics ==
Georgetown is a residential area with easy access to local services such as transport, schools and shops. 96% of people spoke only English at home. 44% born in Australia and 40% born in England. 38% Protestant, 31% Catholic, 25% No Religion, 7% other.
