= 1989 Newcastle earthquake =

Earthquake in New South Wales, Australia

- Location within Australia
- UTC time: 1989-12-27 23:27
- ISC event: 385153
- USGS-ANSS: ComCat
- Local date: 28 December 1989
- Local time: 10:27 a.m. AEDT UTC+11:00
- Magnitude: 5.6 M_{L} (5.4 mb )
- Depth: 11.5 km (7.1 mi)
- Epicentre: Boolaroo, New South Wales; 32.95°S 151.61°E
- Areas affected: Australia
- Total damage: A$4 billion ($9.5 billion in 2022, adjusted for inflation)
- Max. intensity: MMI VIII (Severe)
- Casualties: 13 dead, 160+ injured

The 1989 Newcastle earthquake was an intraplate earthquake that occurred in Newcastle, New South Wales, on Thursday 28 December. The shock measured 5.6 on the Richter scale and was one of Australia's most serious natural disasters, killing 13 people and injuring more than 160. The damage bill has been estimated at A$4 billion (or $9.5 billion in 2022, adjusted for inflation), including an insured loss of about $1 billion (or $2.4 billion in 2022, adjusted for inflation).

The effects were felt over an area of around 200,000 km^{2} (77,000 sq mi) in the state of New South Wales, with isolated reports of movement in areas up to 800 km (500 mi) from Newcastle. Damage to buildings and facilities was reported over an area of 9,000 km^{2} (3,500 sq mi).

== Death toll and damage to buildings ==
The highest death toll and damage occurred at the Newcastle Workers Club, where the floor collapsed. Nine people were killed and many more were trapped beneath the rubble. Another three people were crushed to death when masonry from building façades collapsed onto awnings on Beaumont Street, Hamilton, an inner-city suburb of Newcastle. Following the death of a woman in Broadmeadow from earthquake-related shock, the final death toll was raised to 13.

The earthquake caused damage to over 35,000 homes, 147 schools, and 3,000 commercial and/or other buildings, with significant damage (i.e. damage worth over $1,000; $2,400 in 2022 adjusted for inflation) caused to 10,000 homes and 42 schools (structural damage), within the immediate Newcastle area.

The number of people in the city on the day of the earthquake was lower than usual, due to a strike by local bus drivers. The earthquake struck in the middle of an interview by a local television station NBN with a union representative.

== Statistics ==
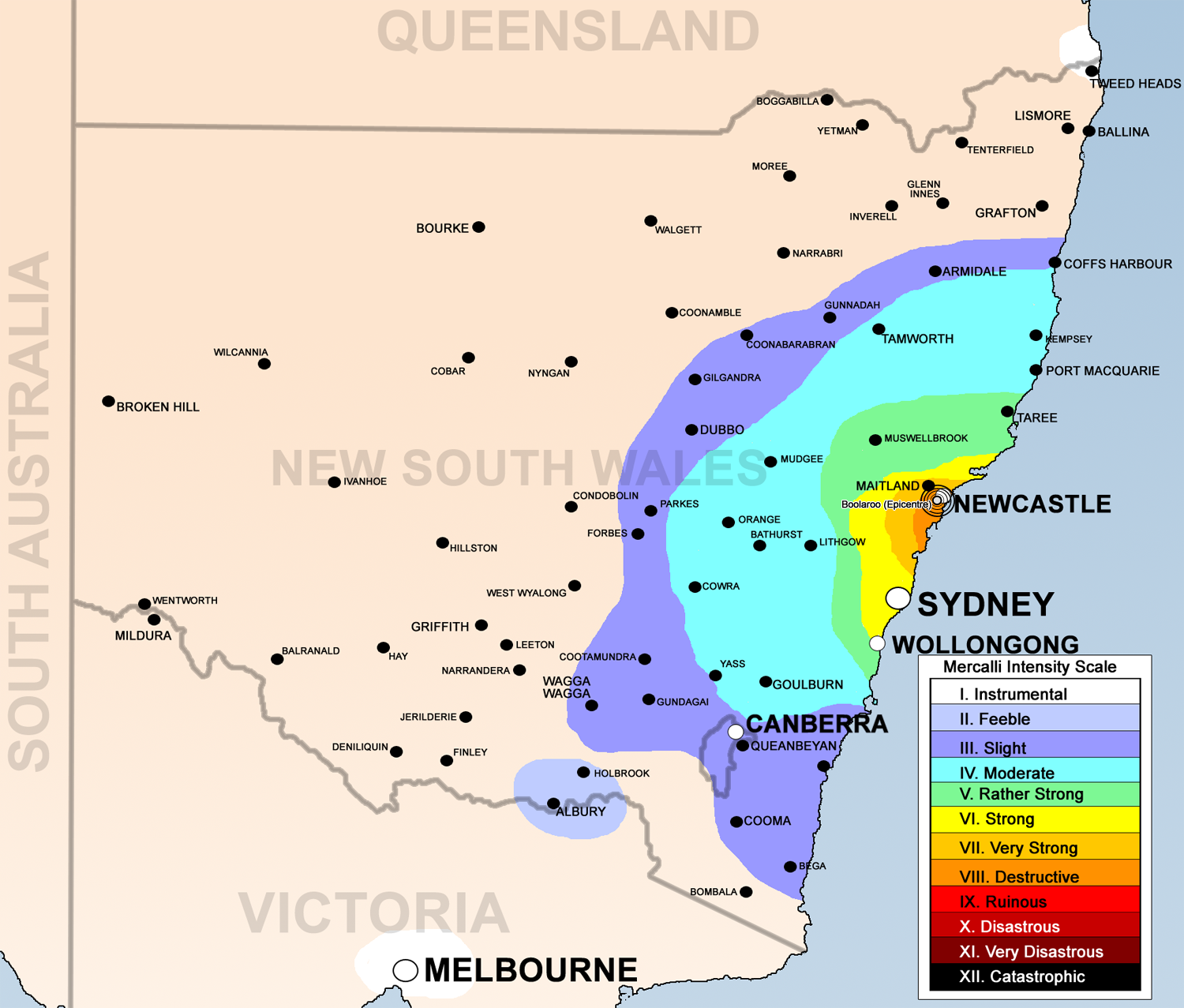
Intensity map for the event

- Deaths: 13 total, including;
  - 9 people who were killed at the Newcastle Workers Club
  - 3 people who were killed in Beaumont Street, Hamilton
  - 1 person who died of earthquake-induced shock

The names of all 13 victims were published later in newspapers such as the Maitland Mercury

- Injuries: 160 people were hospitalised.
- Damaged buildings: 50,000 buildings were damaged; about 80 percent of these were homes.
- Demolition: 300 buildings were demolished including more than 100 homes, The Newcastle Workers Club, The Century Theatre, and King's Hall.
- Human effects: 300,000 people were affected and 1,000 made homeless.
- Cost: The total financial cost of the earthquake is estimated to have amounted to about $4 billion.
- Felt area: Estimated 800 km (500 mi) around the epicentre.
- Magnitude: 5.6 M_{L}; 5.4 mb; VIII MMI
- Epicentre: Boolaroo
- Aftershocks: One aftershock (M 2.1 on the Richter scale) was recorded on 29 December 1989.

== Cause ==
In early 2007, a United States academic claimed that coal mining in the region triggered the earthquake, although earthquake activity has been present in the area at least since European settlement first occurred. That is in addition to the statement by the former head of the earthquake monitoring group at Geoscience Australia, Dr David Denham, that the Newcastle earthquake occurred some distance from mining activity:

"The depths of the focus of the earthquake was about 13, 14 kilometres, whereas the ones associated with mining, they're actually right close to the mine, because that's where the stress release takes place."

Despite records of previous earthquakes in the area, even the most recent construction codes in Newcastle at the time of the earthquake (issued in 1979) required neither the adoption of earthquake-resistant design nor the strengthening of old buildings, although they did encourage owners to provide more than the minimum strength.

== In popular culture ==
=== Music ===
Songs about the Newcastle earthquake include:

- "10:27"/"Holocaust" by the Lost Boys (1990).
- "Earthquakin'", recorded in January 1990 by Newcastle Ska band the Porkers.
- "Faultline" by Australian rock band Silverchair, from 1995.
- "Our Town" by Wilson and Lightfoot
- "The Newcastle Earthquake" by Gary Shearston (1990) CBS 655720

=== Literature ===
- The Newcastle Earthquake Response Record – Volume 1 Prepared by Lt. Col. J.T Purser on behalf of the City of Newcastle (1990) ISBN 9780909115371
- The Earth was Raised Up in Waves Like the Sea: Earthquake Tremors Felt in the Hunter Valley Since White Settlement by Cynthia Hunter (1991) ISBN 9780646017167
- What Came Between by Patrick Cullens features a collection of stories, that begin with the earthquake. (2009) ISBN 9781921372889
- Quakeshake: A Child's Experience of the Newcastle Earthquake by Dave O'Brien ISBN 9781875420049
- Aftershock by Peter Corris (2014) ISBN 9781760110147
- Disasters in Australia and New Zealand by Scott McKinnon and Margaret Cook – ISBN 9789811543821
- Six Seconds by Alan Sunderland (2021) ISBN 9781743838235

=== Other ===
- Aftershocks, a 1991 play by Paul Brown, is based on interviews with members of the destroyed Newcastle Workers Club. A film of the same name was also released in 1998 ISBN 9780868196503
- Newcastle Museum also has a permanent exhibition
- The earthquake occurs in the Season 2, Episode 6 finale of the Australian and British TV series Frayed, set in Newcastle in 1989.

== See also ==
- List of earthquakes in 1989
- List of earthquakes in Australia
