= Hamilton North =

Hamilton North may refer to one of two places:

- Hamilton North, New South Wales, a suburb of Newcastle, New South Wales, Australia
- Hamilton North, New Zealand, one of the suburbs of Hamilton, New Zealand
- Hamilton North and East (ward), electoral ward in Scotland
