= Australian Agricultural Company Mine Manager's House =

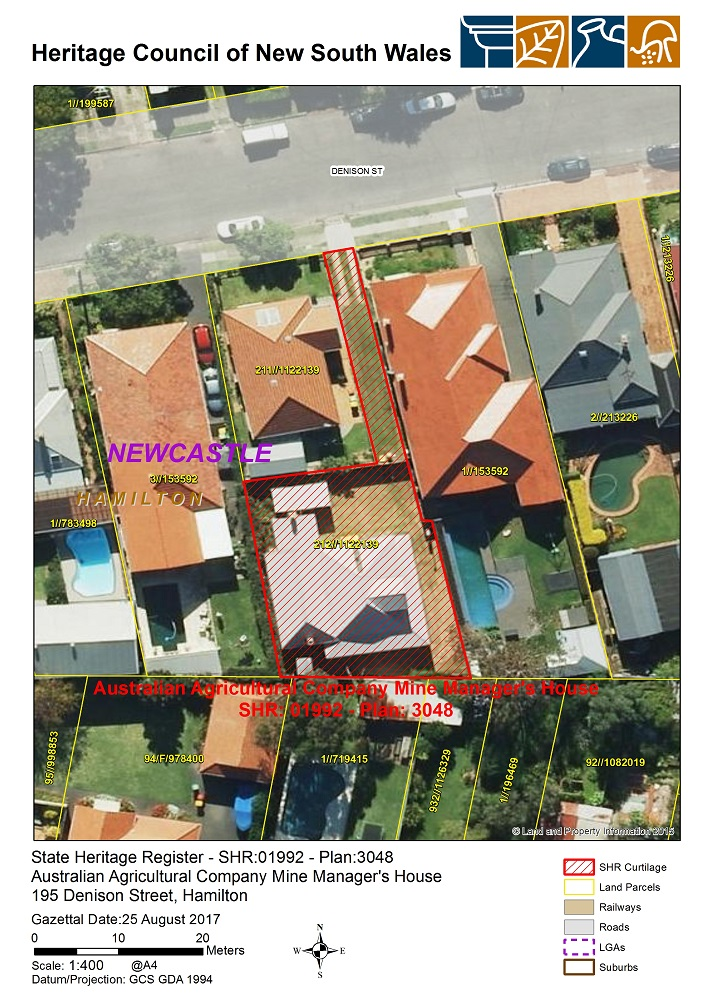
- Heritage boundaries

- Location within New South Wales Location within Australia
- 32.9256°S 151.7409°E
- Location: 195 Denison Street, Hamilton, City of Newcastle, New South Wales, Australia

History
- Built: 1849–1920

New South Wales Heritage Register
- Official name: Australian Agricultural Company Mine Manager's House; A.A. Company House; A. A. Company Mine Manager's Cottage
- Type: state heritage (built)
- Designated: 25 August 2017
- Reference no.: 1992
- Type: House
- Category: Residential buildings (private)
- Builders: Colliery Department of the Australian Agricultural Company

Australian Agricultural Company Mine Manager's House is a heritage-listed former colliery official's residence at 195 Denison Street, Hamilton, a suburb of Newcastle, New South Wales, Australia. It was built from 1849 to 1920. It is also known as A.A. Company House and A. A. Company Mine Manager's Cottage. It was added to the New South Wales State Heritage Register on 25 August 2017.

== History ==
=== Pre- and Post-Contact Aboriginal Custodianship ===
The Awabakal people are the traditional custodians of the site of Newcastle (Muloobinba). It has been claimed that Hamilton was called Nickimble, meaning "place of coal". (Gloucester Advocate, 9 October 1931, p. 3) Cameron's Hill, as dry ground rising above surrounding swampland, may have been a ceremonial site. It is said to have been intermittently visited as late as the 1890s by Awabakal people, who, walking in from Swansea, some 25 km to the south, would throw boomerangs down to what is now Gregson Park.

=== Australian Agricultural Company ===
The Australian Agricultural Company (universally known as the A.A. Company) was established in London in 1824 for "the cultivation and improvement of waste lands in the Colony of New South Wales and for other purposes relating thereto". The Court of Directors included Members of Parliament, directors of the Bank of England and of the East India Company, and other prominent bankers and merchants.

The Company soon became interested in the coal resources of the Newcastle area, which at the time was being exploited by convict labour under government control. Here the A.A. Company selected 1,920 acres of coal-bearing land and obtained privileges amounting to fixed-term privatisation of most NSW coal mining. In opening its "A" Pit of 1831, and importing plant, miners and colliery officials from Scotland and the North of England, the A.A. Company's Colliery Department imposed the Industrial Revolution on a henceforth primitive coal industry.

In 1848 an A.A. Company exploring party boring for coal discovered a superior seam beneath the remote western part of the Company's Newcastle estate. To this "Borehole Seam" a shaft was sunk which in 1850 came into full production as the "D" Pit (or Borehole colliery), the colony's most technologically advanced coal mine. The colliery was opened just in time to support a new export trade with the west coast of North and South America. This trade, initially associated with the California Gold Rush, was to underwrite the prosperity of the Northern coal industry, uniquely linking the Newcastle district with the United States in terms of economics and culture until the collapse of the market with the opening in 1914 of the Panama Canal. Around the colliery grew up a miners' settlement, called "The Borehole" or "The Coal Pits", of earth-floored slab huts of one or two rooms. As coal production increased, the colliers built additional huts on Borehole Hill, addressing Pit Row (now Denison Street) and others at Happy Flat (now Turner Street). In the mid-1850s the A.A. Company subdivided and sold nearby land to create the village of Pit Town.

=== Mine Manager's House ===
Immediately responsible for the operation of the "D" Pit was its Overman, a colliery official. In accordance with corporate hierarchy, the Overman's house was built on the highest point of Borehole Hill, overlooking both the settlement and the colliery. Extensive grounds allowed a degree of self-sufficiency, while an underground tank provided a source of water independent of the wells used by the miners and their families. The northern boundary, addressing Pit Row, was protected by a six-foot picket fence with double gates.

The first Overman was James ('Jimmy') Lindsay. In 1854 Scots-born Lindsay proved his worth in helping to save The Borehole from a bushfire. He also extended the working life of the previously mismanaged "C" Pit in inner Newcastle, and in 1857 helped convert the A.A. Company's horse tramways to locomotive traction. Lindsay chaired the Borehole Co-operative Society and store; recruited volunteers to the NSW Military Forces; and helped found the Pit Town Presbyterian Church and the Borehole Temperance Society.

When in 1860 the A.A. Company dismissed Robert Whyte, its Superintendent of Collieries (also described as Manager of Collieries), Lindsay temporarily assumed the position. He was succeeded by James Barron Winship, who arrived from the UK in early 1861 determined to reduce the pitmens' wages and to break their union, the Coal Miners' Mutual Protective Association of the Hunter District.

Winship, derided as a "psalm-singing Wesleyan" for his strong belief in social hierarchy, was at first unsuccessful, but his importation of 300 contract strikebreakers from Victoria and South Australia soon turned the tables. Many of them, called "blacklegs" (scabs) by the miners and "free labourers" by the Company, were quartered in houses from which Winship's agents had unhesitatingly evicted the striking pitmen and their families. When many labourers, on becoming aware of real reason for their recruitment, broke their contracts and fled, Winship set off after them, on one occasion ranging as far as railway construction works at Picton. Here he arrested a worker under the Masters and Servants Act 1857 (NSW) and sent him, with 20 others, to Sydney in chains. Bitterness against Winship was to last into the 1930s, when a veteran miner claimed, probably mistakenly, that Winship had promised the miners "I will make you eat grass".

James Lindsay, sympathising with the miners, clashed with Winship and left both the Company's service and the Overman's house. Winship and his wife who moved in, with Pit Row becoming Winship Street and Borehole Hill becoming Winship's Hill. As the Overman's-cum-Manager's house remained a modest one, the Winships later found more suitable accommodation.

The house appears thereafter to have been leased to a doctor, although details are lacking. In 1869 it was occupied by Dixon Little, his wife Mary and their children. Little, a North of England-born colliery engineer, was mainly concerned with the nearby Borehole No. 2 colliery, established by Winship. In 1871, Pit Town, The Borehole and Happy Flat were incorporated as the Municipality of Hamilton, named after Edward Terrick Hamilton, Governor of the A.A. Company. In the mid-1870s a new mine, the "H" Pit, was opened some distance to the south. Here Dixon Little superintended underground engineering operations and, having been promoted Chief Engineer, was also responsible for the New Winning colliery (in inner Newcastle, and called the Sea Pit as its workings extended beneath the ocean). When, in June 1889, 11 men and boys were entombed in the "H" Pit disaster, Little assisted in the recovery of the bodies, the provision of the coffins and the re-opening of the mine. Dixon Street, Hamilton, appears to have been named after him. Little retired in May 1899, by which time Winship's Hill had become better known as Cameron's Hill after the former proprietor of a nearby inn.

Little's son, William Richard Little, now succeeded his father, and with his wife Alice and their children moved into the former Manager's house. The A.A. Company, vexed by the Land Tax Act 1910 (Cth) and the collapse of the American export market, afterwards subdivided and sold much of Cameron's Hill. The site of the Manager's house was itself subdivided into three lots, but was retained unsold. The Colliery Department afterwards decided to dispose of its remaining Newcastle assets, including the Manager's house, which William Little purchased in July 1914. While the central lot was occupied by the Manager's house, those remaining were occupied by two homes built by the Little family. These are now 193 Denison Street (c. 1920) and 197 Denison Street (1937). Both were designed by Dixon Allan Little, son of William and Alice, who, despite having trained as an architect, became a railway surveyor and engineer.

William Little, who retired in 1933 and died in 1945, served the A.A. Company for 50 years. The Manager's house was inherited by Dixon Allan Little and his brother Charles Millican Little as tenants in common. It was around this time that Winship Street was renamed Denison Street, removing the obvious link between the Manager's house and James Barron Winship. The Manager's house, formerly 29 Winship Street, became 195 Denison Street. Here Charles Little continued to live until his accidental death in 1963. He left his share in the house to his niece, Naomi McCourt, daughter of Dixon Allan Little, who soon afterwards secured her father's half share but continued to live with him at 197 Denison Street.

The Manager's house, for decades concealed by plantings and surrounding dwellings, faded from public knowledge until in the early 1990s it was identified by history student David Campbell. In 1995 State funding was secured for the transfer of the property to Newcastle City Council, the lot being subdivided to allow Mrs McCourt to build a new dwelling, 195A Denison Street, which was ultimately intended as a caretaker's cottage.

State-funded conservation and restoration works enabled the opening of the house to the public, attracting in excess of 200 visitors per day. The house was also used for architectural short courses, photography exhibitions and the like. 195A Denison Street was acquired by Council in 2004, but after policy changes it was on-sold four years later. In 2016, Council sought to sell the Manager's house by expressions of interest.

== Description ==
The house is situated on a battleaxe lot on the southern side of Denison Street (previously Pit Row and Winship Street) near the crest of Cameron's Hill (previously Borehole Hill and Winship's Hill). The principal, eastern, facade addresses the rear yard of a neighbouring dwelling. Areas of brick paving, concealed by grass, remain on the northern and eastern elevations. The original elements of the house comprise an architecturally undistinguished mid-1850s hipped-roofed cottage in the Colonial Georgian style. Later elements of the house, constructed over an extended period, include a gable-roofed kitchen; a gable-roofed dining room, pantry and entrance hall; and a verandah on the southern elevation. Roofing is of comparatively recent corrugated galvanised iron, much of it laid over earlier timber shingles. The bulk of the structure is of sandstock brick, of which most is either painted or rendered, laid in English bond and bedded in lime mortar, although the complex includes a free-standing weatherboard bathroom/laundry and a free-standing weatherboard lavatory.

=== Condition ===
Much of the house was reported to be in fair condition and highly intact as at 11 January 2017, although parts of the original element are in poor condition. Rendered walls are in fair external condition, and while some areas of face brick have fretted they are limewashed in parts. Some roofing members, previously damaged by termites, have been fortified. Some roof gutter intersections remain unsoldered. Some verandah posts are badly weathered. The walls of the original element lack a damp-proof course, while some floor joists, laid directly on the ground, have in the past been damaged by termites. Some wall areas feature depleted plaster and peeling paint and wallpaper. Some timber flooring, previously affected by damp and termite damage, has been reconstructed. Some ceilings are depleted and/or corroded as the result of past water penetration. Electricity and reticulated water are available.

The item is substantially intact both internally and externally.

=== Modifications and dates ===
==== circa 1849–1850 ====
Construction of the original dwelling of four rooms and an attic with access from a central hallway, with front (eastern) verandah and possibly a rear (western) verandah. A detached kitchen, probably slab-built, appears to have stood to the west on the central hallway axis.

==== circa 1850–1860s ====
The south-eastern (sitting) room, doubling as an office and featuring both internal and external doors, is converted to a bedroom. This involves the infilling of the external doorway and probably the rendering of the southern wall.

==== 1860 ====
The existing kitchen wing, and perhaps the rear verandah, are constructed. If the rear verandah already existed, it may at this time be partially enclosed.

==== 1900 ====
The rear verandah is demolished to make way for a dining room and pantry addition linking the kitchen to a new rear entry, protected by a metal canopy, featuring a star, two kangaroos and an emu in celebration of Federation. Two rooms of the original element are joined to create a larger sitting room, involving the removal of two fireplaces and a chimney. The shingle roof is sheeted over in iron to match the roofs of the kitchen and additions. The rear verandah is removed. A southern verandah is added, complete with a decorative valance which is also retrofitted to the front verandah, the posts of which are replaced, the floorboards being replaced in concrete. Gas lighting is provided and the kitchen is equipped with a fuel stove.

==== circa 1907 ====
The outside lavatory, which will originally have been served by an on-site cesspit and then by the Hamilton municipal pan system, is relocated to its present position for compulsory connection to the Newcastle district sewerage system.

==== circa 1920 ====
Interior redecoration occurs. The weatherboard bathroom/laundry to the north is probably constructed at about this time, replacing a primitive facility in an enclosed section of the southern verandah. The roof dormer is enlarged, providing additional attic space. Electricity is laid on; most gas light fittings are removed. A fibro garage is constructed addressing Denison Street.

==== Mid-1990s ====
The NSW government funds the purchase of the subdivided property by Newcastle City Council, as well as conservation and security works and the provision of an enclosed lavatory on the southern verandah.

==== 2016 ====
The property is advertised for sale by expressions of interest.

== Heritage listing ==
The former Australian Agricultural Company Mine Manager's House, Hamilton, is of state heritage significance for its historical associations with the Colliery Department of the Australian Agricultural Company (A.A. Company), one of Australia's oldest companies and an entity of much importance in the social and economic development of New South Wales. The house has state heritage significance as the only readily legible example of a structure built by the A.A. Company's Colliery Department. It is of state heritage significance for its special association with the development of the A.A. Company's technologically advanced "D" Pit. This was the first colliery associated with the famous Borehole Seam, the exploitation of which supported the exponential expansion of the Northern NSW coal industry during the nineteenth century; forged unique economic and cultural links between the Newcastle district and the United States of America; and stimulated the establishment of the colliery townships that coalesced into the present City of Newcastle. The house is of state heritage significance in its association with persons prominent in the social and technological development of the nineteenth century NSW coal industry, and in demonstrating the social hierarchies and living standards associated with that industry, symbolising the continuing relationship between the A.A. Company and the people of NSW over two centuries. The place is of state heritage significance in demonstrating the origins of the suburb of Hamilton, originally known as The Borehole, and in contributing to the sense of place of the local community.

Australian Agricultural Company Mine Manager's House was listed on the New South Wales State Heritage Register on 25 August 2017 having satisfied the following criteria.

The place is important in demonstrating the course, or pattern, of cultural or natural history in New South Wales.

The Australian Agricultural Company Mine Manager's House, Hamilton, is of state heritage significance for its association with the Colliery Department of the Australian Agricultural Company, an entity important in the social and economic development of NSW. The house is of state heritage significance in its association with the early period of technologically advanced coal mining in NSW, and in its demonstration of social hierarchies and living standards in the nineteenth century NSW coal industry. The house is of state heritage significance in demonstrating the leading role of the Colliery Department of the Australian Agricultural Company in the discovery and mining of the Borehole Seam. It was the exploitation of this coal seam that supported the exponential expansion of the Northern NSW coal industry during the nineteenth century; forged unique economic and cultural links between the Newcastle district and the United States of America; and stimulated the establishment of the colliery townships that coalesced into the present City of Newcastle.

The place has a strong or special association with a person, or group of persons, of importance of cultural or natural history of New South Wales's history.

The Australian Agricultural Company Mine Manager's House, Hamilton, is of state heritage significance in demonstrating continuity and change in the lives of nineteenth century NSW colliery officials and their families, affording a comparison with the living conditions of non-salaried colliers and their dependents. The place is of state heritage significance for its strong association with senior staff of the Colliery Department of the Australian Agricultural Company, several of whom were prominent in the social and technological development of the NSW coal industry.

The place is important in demonstrating aesthetic characteristics and/or a high degree of creative or technical achievement in New South Wales.

The Australian Agricultural Company Mine Manager's House, Hamilton, is of state heritage significance in demonstrating, by way of its highly intact heritage fabric, the manner in which an early colliery official's residence strongly associated with a mine important in the development of the NSW coal industry has been adapted over a known period to suit changing economic, cultural and social conditions and aesthetic tastes.

The place has potential to yield information that will contribute to an understanding of the cultural or natural history of New South Wales.

The Australian Agricultural Company Mine Manager's House, Hamilton, is of state heritage significance in its potential to yield new information as to the lives of NSW salaried colliery officials and their dependents during the nineteenth century. The place is also of state heritage significance for its archaeological potential.

The place possesses uncommon, rare or endangered aspects of the cultural or natural history of New South Wales.

The Australian Agricultural Company Mine Manager's House, Hamilton is of state heritage significance in demonstrating through its fabric the social hierarchies and living standards of nineteenth century NSW colliery officials and their families. The item is also of state heritage significance as the only readily legible example of a structure associated with the Colliery Department of the Australian Agricultural Company, an entity important in the social and economic development of NSW.

The place is important in demonstrating the principal characteristics of a class of cultural or natural places/environments in New South Wales.

The Australian Agricultural Company Mine Manager's House, Hamilton, is of state heritage significance as a fine example of a substantially intact nineteenth century colliery official's residence demonstrating the customs and philosophies of its periods of construction and alteration. It is also of state heritage significance in providing evidence as to the establishment and development of nineteenth century NSW coal mining communities.
