= Frederick Menkens =

German architect

Frederick Menkens (1855-1901) was a German architect who built several notable buildings in the Newcastle and Hunter Valley. Additionally, he built 28 city buildings between Union and the city East End.

== Early life ==
Born in Varel Oldenburg Germany in 1855, Menkens was the son of Herman Heirich Menkens and his wife Anna Margaret. He was home schooled until he was thirteen years old. He spent five years completing a practical trade and attended the building academies in Nienburg and Holzminden. He attended the Royal Polytechnicum at Hanover where he received a Diploma in Architecture in 1876. As a part of his education, Menkens traveled across Europe to study architectural movements in Germany, France, the Netherlands, Belgium, Milan, and England.

== Arriving in Australia ==
He arrived in Adelaide in 1878. After a few months in Adelaide he moved to Melbourne to the Colonial Architect's Office. He spent some touring around Tasmania A slump in the building industry caused him to work as a tradesman along the Murray River, at Echuca and at Sandhurst. In 1881 he set up an architect practice in Maitland then in 1882 moved the practice to Newcastle.

== Partnerships ==
In 1884 he completed the interior of the temporary pro-Cathedral designed by John Horbury Hunt. In 1907, he took F. G. Casteleden into partnership. Albert Augustus Dangar hired him to complete jobs including an addition of a balcony to a terrace of houses and Law offices which were sited in Bolton Street. He worked for many notable citizens such as Bishop James Murrary.

== Notable buildings ==
- School of Arts, Newcastle
- The Deaf and Dumb Institute (School for Deaf Girls), Waratah
- the Mechanics' Institute, Hamilton
- · In 1885 Stewart Keightley the AA Manager hired Menken to build in his new villa residence
- ·In 1886 designed a small shop and store in Scott Street
- ·In 1888 built a large bond store for Messrs Earp Gillam and company who were general merchants, colonial shipping and insurance agents with interests in collieries
- · In 1899 he built award-winning St Andrew's Presbyterian Church and the Baptist Tabernacle, Newcastle
- · St Augustine ‘s Church of England, Merewether designed a small school room
- · In 1901 Cohen's in Bolton Street
- · In 1897 designed additions to the Sailor's Home and a residence near Muswellbrook
- · Gas Company designed a meter house
- ·In 1898 additions to an old mansion in Waratah
- · T . Garret & Sons Ltd Produce Merchants, Hunter Strret 1905
- Frederick Ash Building
- R Hall & Son, Produce Merchants Scott Street 1905
- Lance Villa in Church Street
- extensions to Jesmond House
- Longworth Institute
- Wood's Chambers
- · St Joseph's Convent at Lochinvar ·

== Awards ==
In 1890 the Newcastle Borough council offered a premium of 100 for competitive designs showing how the whole of the southern portion of Market Square.·After five applicants were reviewed in 1891. he won the prize He won a competition for the building of the main Presbyterian Church, St Andrews, and in 1891 for a new Town Hall in Newcastle. After a stormy meeting the aldermen of the council awarded the £100 prize to Menkens but later disagreements brought an end to the scheme.

== Personal life ==
On November 16, 1877, a girl Alice was born to Frederick Menkens and Alice Deerlove. His abode is listed as 'unknown and she was 'lying in hospital' and his occupation is listed as Architect and she was a 'single woman'. [Anglican Diocese of Melbourne Register of Baptisms 1850-1889] In June 1895 Menkens was sued in the Supreme Court for slander and £1000 damages by H. Kingsbury, an electrical contractor, whom he had accused of installing a lightning conductor made of cheaper metal than specified and of trying to deceive his client. Kingsbury was awarded £126 in damages but Menkens refused to pay and was imprisoned for debt.· At first in the Maitland lock-up, he was feasted by his friends, who also supplied him with comfortable furniture, his drawing equipment and commissions until he was moved to Darlinghurst Gaol.

In October his estate was sequestrated; apart from what he owed to Kingsbury he admitted moneys marked cash in his cheque book were winnings at the races and items drawn to self were losses; in October 1894 he had borrowed £40 from William Rouse to cover losses on the Caulfield Cup. His only assets were a block of land at Auburn and his wearing apparel. On 9 August 1896 his estate was released and he was discharged from prison.

In 1907 he returned to Germany to visit his aging mother. He returned to live in Sydney in his newly built house in Avoca Street, Randwick. On 10 March 1910, he died of cirrhosis aged 55. He was buried in the Anglican section of Waverly cemetery. He had no children; he briefly married a widow Margaret Downey until the supreme court dissolved the marriage on 25th 1891. Menkens lived largely a bachelor life, lodging at the Great Northern Hotel.
