= Maryville, New South Wales =

Maryville
- Suburb
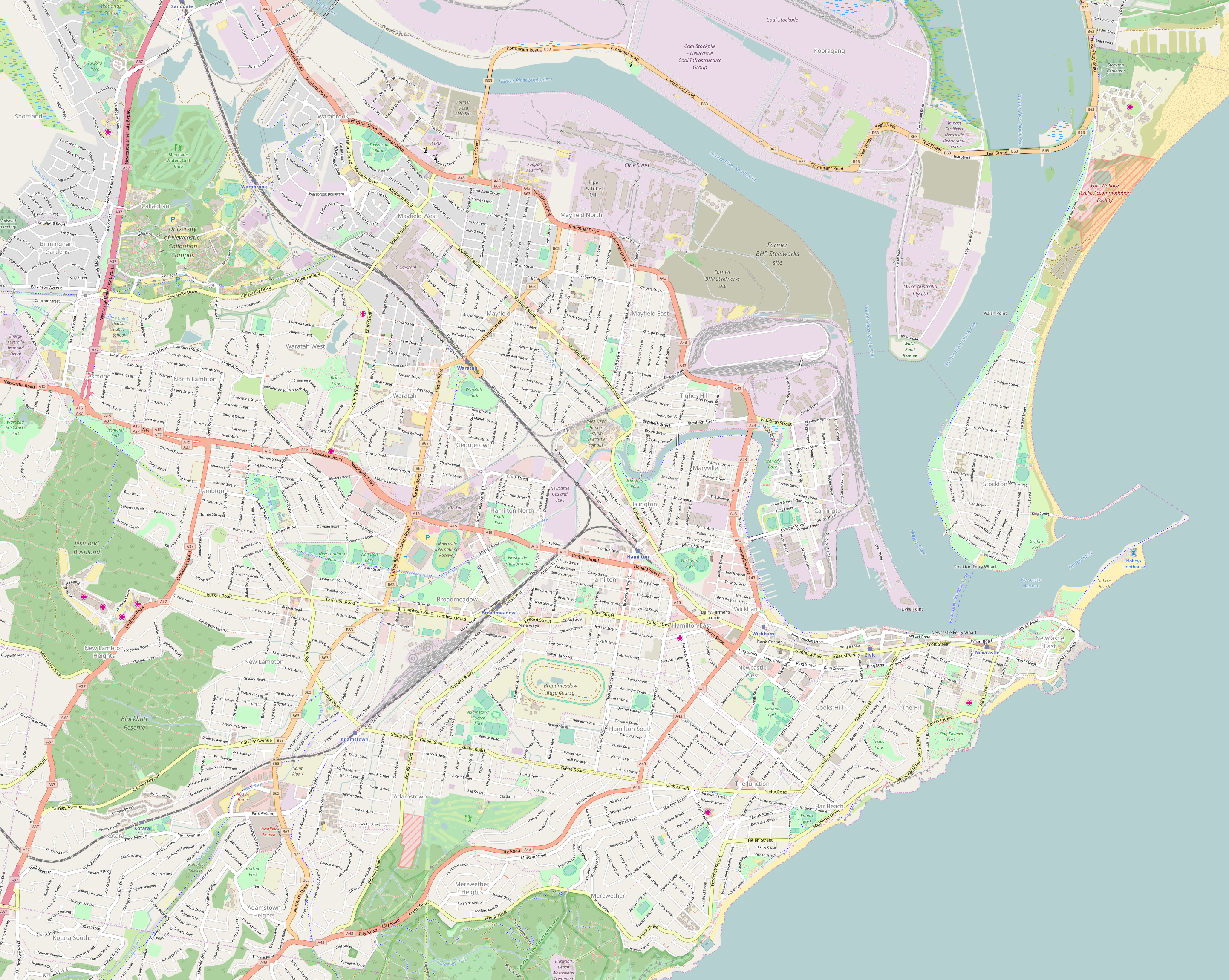
- Interactive map of Maryville
- Coordinates: 32°54′54″S 151°45′04″E
- Country: Australia
- State: New South Wales
- City: Newcastle
- LGA: City of Newcastle
- Location: 4 km (2.5 mi) NW of Newcastle; 31 km (19 mi) SE of Maitland; 166 km (103 mi) NNE of Sydney

Government
  - State electorate: Newcastle
  - Federal division: Newcastle

Area
  - Total: 0.5 km^{2} (0.19 sq mi)
- Elevation: 2 m (6.6 ft)

Population
  - Total: 1,671 (SAL 2021)
- Postcode: 2293
- Parish: Newcastle
Suburbs around Maryville
Tighes Hill	Tighes Hill	Carrington
Islington	Maryville	Carrington
Islington	Wickham	Carrington

Maryville is an inner suburb of Newcastle, New South Wales, Australia, located 4 kilometres (2.5 mi) northwest of Newcastle's central business district.

== Origin ==
Maryville is a Harbourside suburb of Newcastle, surrounded by the Throsby Creek system. It is situated by the boundary of Throsby Creek, by Islington Park to the south and Wickham to the East. Maryville was named after Mary Hannell, and previously known as Smedmore.

== Today ==
Locally, the Throsby Waters Cycleway, Islington Park, cafes, and harbour provide many locals with a lifestyle which is becoming increasingly in demand.

== Real Estate ==
In past times, Maryville was considered an industrial suburb where much of Newcastle's working class resided in the smaller miners cottages. However, in recent years, Maryville has become one of Newcastle's most expensive suburbs, breaking the $1 million barrier in November 2021.

Gentrifying quite significantly, many of the older dwellings are becoming developed and sold for increasing profits. In 2019, 84 Estell Street sold for $1.6M. In 2021, 76 Estell Street & 24 Northumberland Street sold for $1.4M & $1.413M respectively.
