= Newcastle Show =

Agricultural show in Newcastle, Australia

- Begins: 27 February 2026
- Ends: 1 March 2026
- Frequency: Annual
- Location: Newcastle Showground
- Years active: 124
- Inaugurated: 1902
- Most recent: 28 February-2 March 2025
- Attendance: 100,000 (2021)
- Organiser: Newcastle Agricultural Horticultural & Industrial Association
- Website: www.newcastleshow.com.au

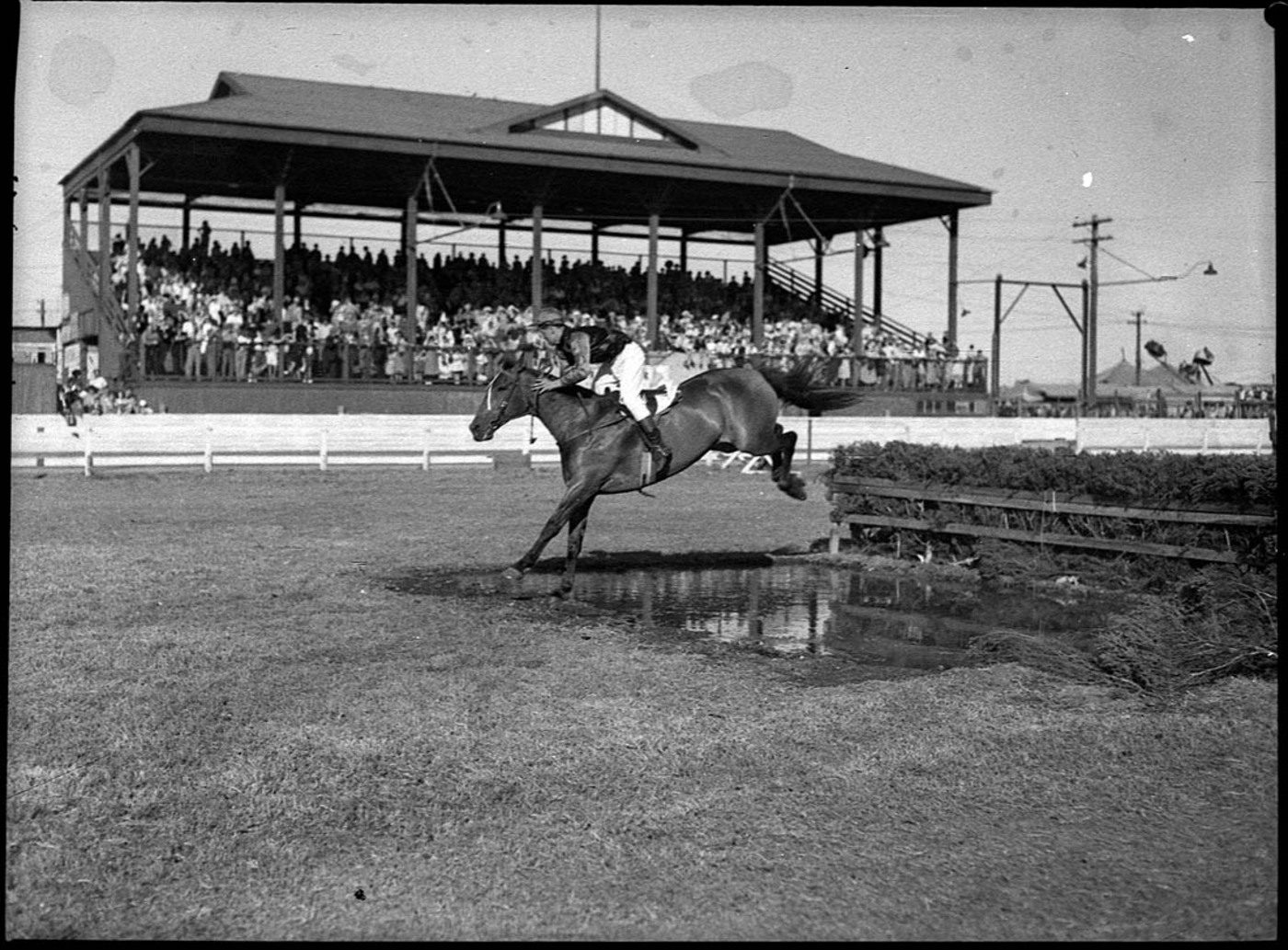
Ring events at Newcastle Show in 1952.

The Newcastle Show is an annual agricultural show held by the Newcastle AH & I Association at the Newcastle Showground in Broadmeadow, a suburb of Newcastle, New South Wales, Australia.

The show was formed in 1899 and held the first Newcastle Show in May 1902. It has been held each year since with breaks for World War I, the 1919 influenza epidemic and World War II. The show was not held in 2007 after losses in 2006, however it returned in 2008. With improvements to the showground and expanded entertainment, the show crowds in 2008 were up by 50 per cent.

The show comprises a ring show with livestock parades, show jumping and various attractions such as speedway cars, marching bands or fireworks; an agriculture pavilion with displays and judging of livestock and produce; commercial stands and exhibits; a Hall of Industry with art, photography, handcrafts, cookery etc. There is also live entertainment, a showbag pavilion, a sideshow alley with amusement rides, shopping, food courts, etc. The Newcastle Entertainment Centre is located inside the Newcastle Showground and is used for the show.

Newcastle Show Day was formerly a public holiday which usually applied to the Newcastle and Lake Macquarie local government areas, however from 2012, the local government deemed the public holiday null and has only been a local event day only available to a very few number of people, including people like council staff.
