= Islington, New South Wales =

Islington Newcastle, New South Wales
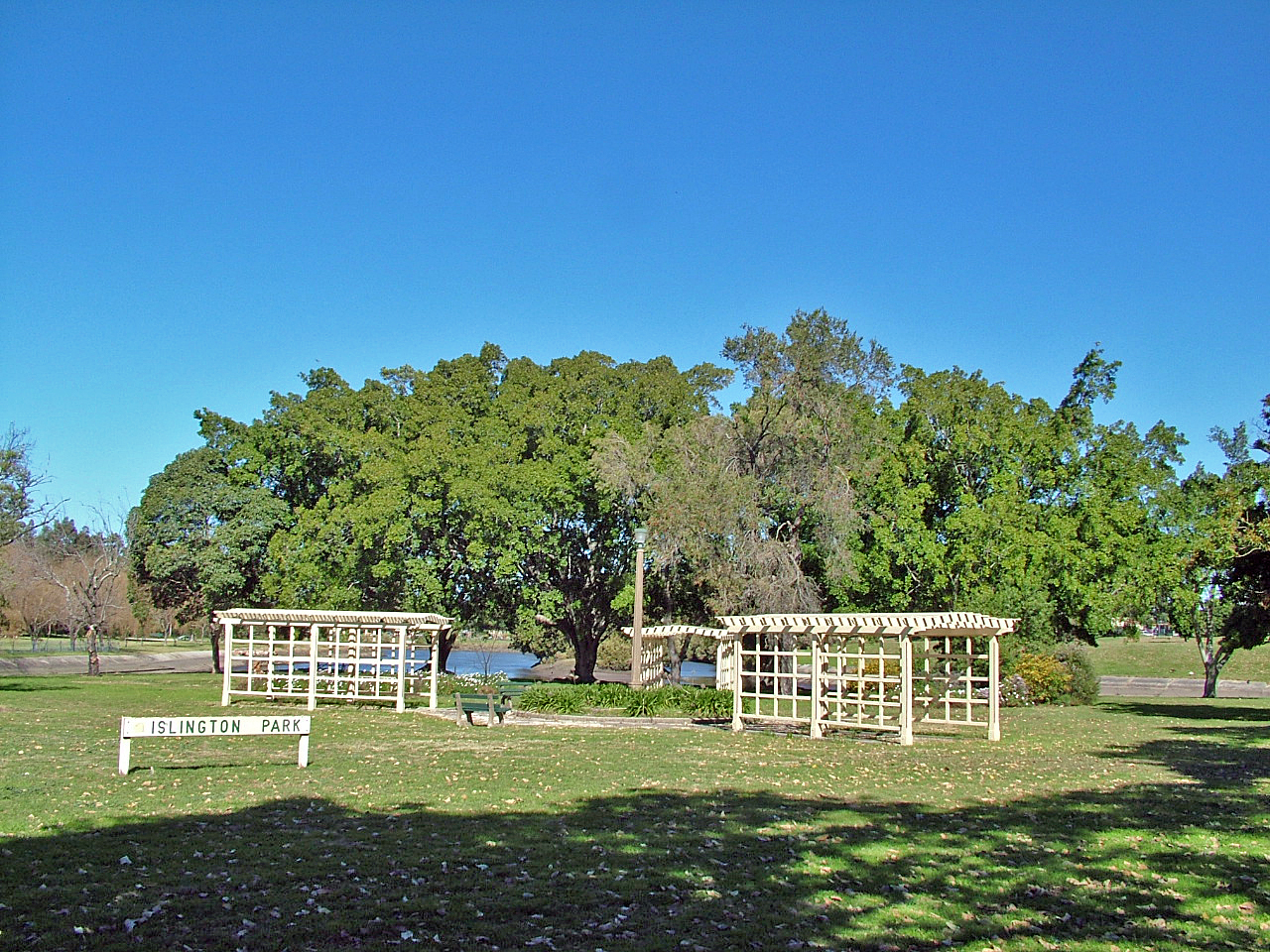
- Islington Park, looking towards Throsby Creek

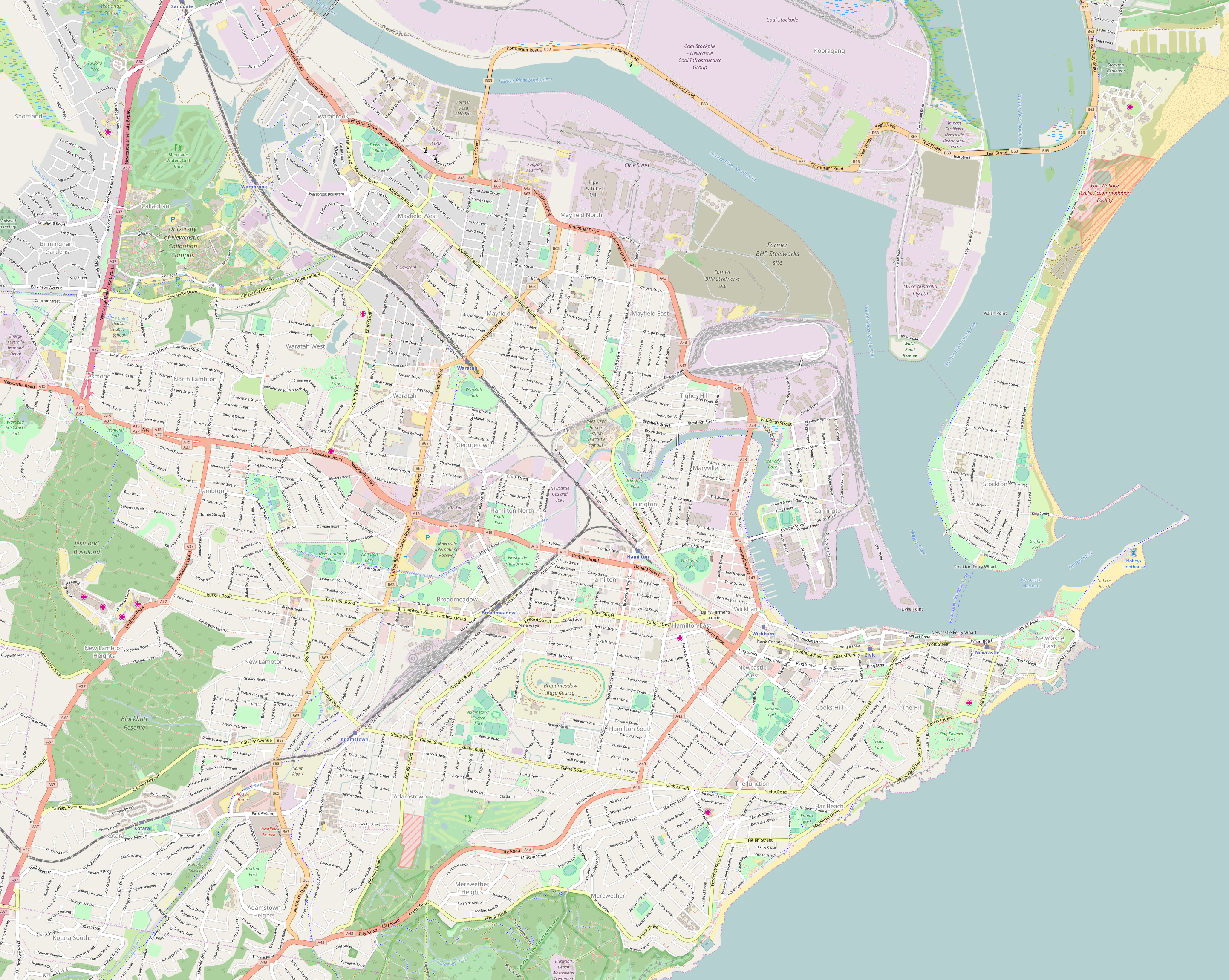
- Coordinates: 32°54′57″S 151°44′46″E
- Population: 2,026 (SAL 2021)
  - Density: 2,145/km^{2} (5,560/sq mi)
- Established: 1870s
- Postcode(s): 2296
- Elevation: 8 m (26 ft)
- Area: 0.713 km^{2} (0.3 sq mi)^{Note1}
- Location: 165 km (103 mi) NNE of Sydney; 3.4 km (2 mi) W of Newcastle; 31 km (19 mi) SE of Maitland
- LGA(s): City of Newcastle
- Region: Hunter
- County: Northumberland
- Parish: Newcastle
- State electorate(s): Newcastle
- Federal division(s): Newcastle
Mean max temp	Mean min temp	Annual rainfall
25.6 °C; 78 °F	8.4 °C; 47 °F	1,135.9 mm 44.7 in
Suburbs around Islington:
Mayfield	Tighes Hill	Maryville
Hamilton North	Islington	Maryville, Wickham
Hamilton North, Hamilton	Hamilton	Wickham

Islington (/ˈɪzlɪŋtən/ IZ-ling-tən) is a suburb of the city of Newcastle in the Hunter Region of New South Wales, Australia. Located only 3.4 kilometres (2.1 mi) from the Newcastle CBD on one of Newcastle's major arterial roads, it was initially developed as a residential suburb. Today it includes a small industrial area and is adjacent to the Newcastle campus of the Hunter Institute of Technology. Its southeastern border is occupied entirely by the Main Northern railway line. The suburb has one railway station, which is shared with, and named after, adjacent Hamilton.

== History ==
The Aboriginal people, in this area, the Awabakal, were the first people of this land.

Islington was developed in the 1870s as a residential suburb. It is located on Maitland Road, which later became part of the Pacific Highway and was part of Highway 1 until the Minmi to Beresfield section of the Sydney-Newcastle Freeway was completed in 1998. The convenient location attracted small factories.

The Regent Theatre in Islington, located on the corner of Maitland Road and Beaumont Street, opened on 2 December 1928. In 1941 or 1942, Hoyts Theatres obtained a majority interest in the property but, with the advent of television, the Regent was unable to survive and closed on 27 June 1964. After remaining empty for five years, the building reopened as a hardware store in August 1969 and operates in that capacity today.

In 1947, Lettesi (a settler group made up of nearly 150 families from the village of Lettopalena in the Abruzzo region of Italy) settled in the Islington region, primarily due to its proximity to the BHP steel works.

== Present day ==
Islington Park, located on Throsby Creek, has a cycleway that links Islington to the redeveloped Newcastle foreshore. Islington is located at the north-eastern end of Beaumont Street, the restaurant precinct of Newcastle. Known as the antique district of Newcastle, with numerous shops primarily located on Maitland Road, which also houses Islington's main trade area, with more shops on Beaumont Street.

Islington is known for its sex work industry and brothels.

== Transport ==
Maitland Road, a suburban carrier of the Pacific Highway, runs through the suburb and links it to Mayfield and Newcastle West.

Islington is served by bus services operated by Newcastle Transport, including routes 11, 138, 140 and 55N along Maitland Road. In addition, the Hamilton railway station, located on the Main Northern railway line, is located on the suburb's southern boundary and provides regular services to Maitland, Newcastle Interchange and Sydney.

== Population ==
In 2016 1883 people lived in Islington with the median age of 34. 81.6% were born in Australia, 1.8% England,1.2% New Zealand, 0.9% India, Afghanistan 0.8% and 0.7% Philippines. 50% stated No Religion, 15.8% Catholic, 10.4% Anglican and 2.7% Christian. 85.4% only spoke English at home with 0.9% Italian, 0.7% Hazaraghi, 0.6% Japanese, 0.5 German and 0.5% Dinka.

== Notes ==
1. Area calculation is based on 1:100000 map 9232 NEWCASTLE.
