= Frederick Ash Building =

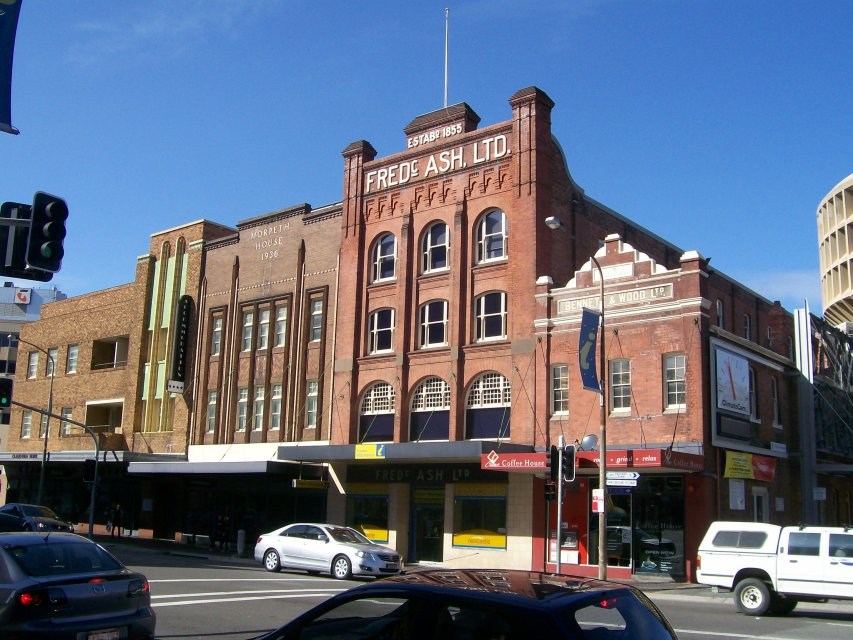

- Location within New South Wales Location within Australia
- 32.9272°S 151.7730°E
- Location: 359–361 Hunter Street, Newcastle, City of Newcastle, New South Wales, Australia

History
- Built: 1904–1905

Site notes
- Architect: Frederick. B. Menkens

New South Wales Heritage Register
- Official name: Frederick Ash Building
- Type: state heritage (built)
- Designated: 2 April 1999
- Reference no.: 642
- Type: Warehouse/storage area
- Category: Commercial

Frederick Ash Building is a heritage-listed warehouse and retail premises at 359–361 Hunter Street, Newcastle, New South Wales, Australia. It was designed by Frederick B. Menkens and built from 1904 to 1905. It was added to the New South Wales State Heritage Register on 2 April 1999.

== History ==
The Frederick Ash Building is located within the area bound by Hunter, Burwood, King and Wheeler Place/Plaza in Newcastle. The area was part of a grant of 2,000 acres made to the Australian Agricultural Company (A.A. Company) in 1829. The A.A. Company introduced large scale coal mining in Newcastle, even exporting to the East India Company. The A.A. Company held a monopoly over control of the Newcastle mines until 1853. During this time, government policy did not allow them to sell off small parcels of the land. However, when the A.A. Company relinquished sole rights of the mine to the government in 1853, they were allowed to sell blocks of land which saw the township of Newcastle move westward.

A portion of land was purchased by Frederick Ash under the common business name of Fredrick Ash Limited or Fred Ash Limited est. 1855 when he was 23 years old. In 1860 Frederick Ash went into partnership with James Norsworthy. In 1860–1861 Ash and Norsworthy were recorded as owning and occupying a shop of iron construction in King Street and the adjoining property and wooden house owned and occupied by Frederick Ash. The partnership lasted 6 years as Norsworthy returned to England due to ill health.

The Frederick Ash Building was designed by F. B. Menkens. It was built in 1904–1905 as a warehouse for Frederick Ash. It appears to have served as a retail showroom with office and storage space on upper floors. Frederick Ash used this building to sell hardware and store building materials with workshops and packing rooms behind.

Frederick Menkens was born in the 1850s in Germany. It is likely he left Europe because of the political unrest there and to escape military service. He migrated to Australia in the 1870s whereby he established a practice in Maitland in 1881. In Germany Menken's gained experienced whereby he worked for 6 monthly periods during summer as a bricklayer, stonemason, carpenter, plumber, painter and clerk of works. During winter he studied at building academies focusing on the theoretical and artistic aspects of his profession. At the end of this five-year period he entered the Royal Polytechnicum at Hanover and received his diploma in architecture. Menkens' design is significant because of its rarity as an example of a small scale commercial building in the Romanesque style which contributes to the historic landscape.

Frederick Ash Limited was an innovative company listing for sale galvanised, corrugated and plain iron, sheet lead, cements, electrical materials, white leads, oils, 53 varnishes, British plate and sheet glass, builders' ironmongery, household ironmongery, brushware, mouldings and paper hangings. In 1897 Frederick Ash Limited advertised the arrival of goods from overseas. In 1908 Frederick Ash Ltd advertised themselves as merchants and importers with head offices. They boasted of a warehouse in Hunter Street West, bonded and free warehouses in Burwood Street as well as a galvanised iron warehouse in Church Street. They also had a London office located at 556 Mansion House Chambers, 11 Queen Victoria Street, S.W. In 1929 the company was described as merchants, importers and manufacturers, specialists in building material. Frederick Ash also had the advantage that Sydney firms did not compete for work in Newcastle. The company had offices in Cessnock, Sydney, Leichhardt, Marrickville, Lismore and Wollongong.

The building was subsequently acquired by the Newcastle City Council, with the council's Digital Print Services business operating out of the building as of 2018. The council will vacate the building in late 2018 as part of a move of council staff to a new office building. It has proposed to either sell or long-term lease the Frederick Ash Building with the possibility of redevelopment.

=== Timeline of the Frederick Ash company ===
- 1887: Floated as a Limited Liability Company under the name of "Fredc Ash, Limited".
- 1891: London office opened to "regulate the export of English and Continental merchandise".
- 1920: The original Frederick Ash Limited went into liquidation and a new company of the same name was formed, acquiring the assets of the earlier company.
- 1937: Change of company name to Frederick Ash Pty. Ltd.
- 1955: Name of company reverted to Frederick Ash Limited.
- 1977: Name of company became Frederick Ash Pty. Ltd.
- 1969: The company was taken over and became a wholly owned subsidiary of Swans Limited and the Hunter Street property was sold and occupied on a leasehold basis.

== Description ==
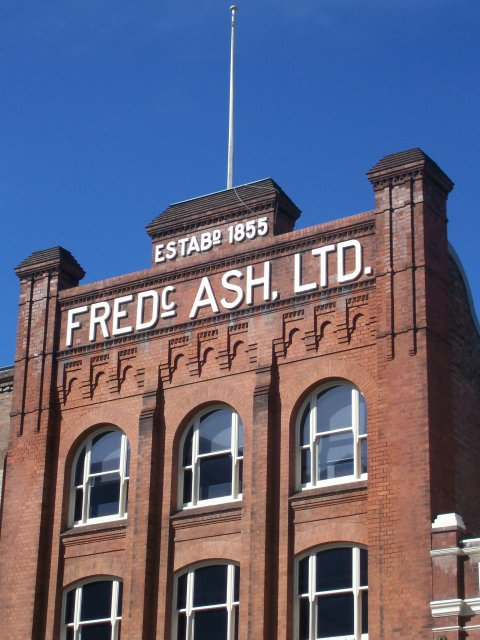
Front facade

The Frederick Ash Building was built in 1904-1905. It has a distinguished facade which contributes considerably to this lively and historic streetscape. This building is a fine example of a small scale commercial building in the Romanesque style which contributes to the historic landscape.

The building is 60 metres long and 15 metres wide. The front section is 21 metres long and 4 storeys high while the rear section is 30 metres long and 3 storeys high. There are 12 equal bays on eastern side and 13 equal bays on western side. The building has a four-storey facade in three bays articulated by large end piers and smaller intermediate ones. The fine brickwork is red-brown in colour. The first and third floor windows have semicircular arched heads, those at first floor level being treated as Diocletian windows with multiple panes in the semicircles. The windows of the second floor have segmental arched openings and the skyline is elaborate with brick machicolation, stepped piers with corbelled tops. The words "FRED ASH LTD" can be seen on the parapet above the skyline. On a panel above that, it states, "ESTAB 1855".

The ground floor has a tall ceiling sheeted with decorative pressed metal in the five northern bays, which also have slender columns of cast iron. The staircase, at the rear of the building, is of timber with turned timber balustrade.

The first floor has wide semicircular front windows and in the front bas, ceilings, cornices and beams casings of pressed metal with Art Nouveau decorative panels. There are attached brick wall piers of bull-nose bricks on all storeys. The floors are of timber and there are toilets at this level.

On the second floor are the former offices, which have some remnants of fine joinery and panelling. There is a central row of timber posts supporting the lateral timber beams and the ceilings are mainly of ripple iron.

The third or top floor has 14 inch brick perimeter walls. The central posts are timber-bracketed. The goods elevator at the rear services all floors. Above this the timber boarded ceiling serves also as an attic floor beneath a collar-tied rafter roof which is covered with terracotta tiles.

== Heritage listing ==
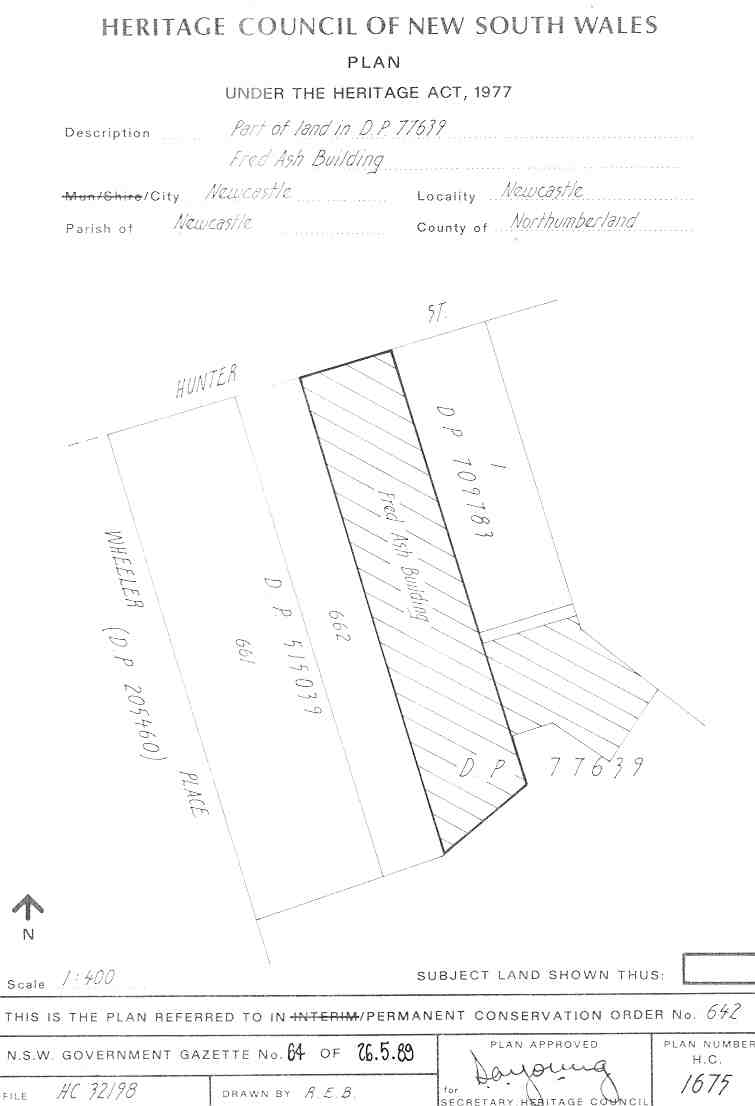
Heritage boundaries

The Frederick Ash Building characterises the presence of small business associated with tradesmen and their residences in Newcastle at the end of the 19th century.

The building represents the town's development and the possibilities available to tradesmen in a growing country. Major developments in mercantile and shop fitting enterprise and direct association with important building phases, activities, events and people were a result of this period.

The building also reflects the importance of the evolution of the architect. It is an example of work by Frederick Menkens who was influential in designing and shaping early 20th century Newcastle. He enriched English architecture of Newcastle through his German "romantic" background. It came to be known as a Romanesque revival due to his mastery of brick construction and detailing.

Frederick Ash was a tradesman turned merchant who was able to prosper in conjunction with the growth of Newcastle. The business supplied the building trade of Newcastle and expanded to serve the surrounding districts and developed some specialist markets such as shop fitting. The retail shop was the public face of Frederick Ash's hardware enterprise. His business reflected the building needs and availability of resources and trades in the Newcastle area and attracted people to that part of town. Frederick Ash introduced new products to the area, some imported but many specially manufactured in his own enterprise.

The Frederick Ash Building is a significant element in the evolution and pattern of the history of Newcastle and to a lesser extent NSW.

Frederick Ash Building was listed on the New South Wales State Heritage Register on 2 April 1999 having satisfied the following criteria.

The place is important in demonstrating the course, or pattern, of cultural or natural history in New South Wales.

The Frederick Ash building was the public face of the Frederick Ash enterprise, and is a significant element in the evolution and development of the city of Newcastle. The Frederick Ash complex is associated with the development of a major mercantile and shop fitting enterprise and with Frederick Ash himself who was a tradesman, who became a successful businessman.

The place has a strong or special association with a person, or group of persons, of importance of cultural or natural history of New South Wales's history.

The building is associated with successful enterprises which in this case is synonymous with the name Frederick Ash. Frederick Ash built up an empire which enabled him to open new stores both here and overseas as demand and new technology increased for his product

The Frederick Ash Building also provides a link to a classic example of work by Frederick Menkens who was influential in designing architecture in Newcastle at the time. He used his German "romantic" background to create a Romanesque revival exhibiting his mastery of brick construction and detailing.

In 1884 he advertised his professional skills as considerable continental and eight years experience in Australian Colonies with a Diploma as an architect from the Royal Academy of Arts and Sciences, of Hanover (Germany). He was also the author of several prize designs of Prominent Public Buildings (Godden/Mackay, 1992, Section 3.10.3.).

The place is important in demonstrating aesthetic characteristics and/or a high degree of creative or technical achievement in New South Wales.

The Frederick Ash facade is a significant townscape element within the City of Newcastle. The building relates to others in the street, through its size and detailing. The facade is of finely articulated brickwork vigorously modelled with a mastery rare in Australia. The facade is a masterly example of the Victorian Romanesque style applied to a small commercial building. The Frederick Ash building is remarkable for the variety and quality of its brick detailing within a classically ordered arrangement. The building is a significant element in an historic visual corridor along Hunter Street.

The place has strong or special association with a particular community or cultural group in New South Wales for social, cultural or spiritual reasons.

The retail building has had strong social and cultural links with the Newcastle community for a period of 87 years. The site had a significant role as a hardware merchandiser for the community. The site was a significant provider of services, facilities, goods and new developments in hardware and homemaking for the local community and the building rate. The Frederick Ash retail building is a well known local landmark.

The place has potential to yield information that will contribute to an understanding of the cultural or natural history of New South Wales.

The building has potential to yield information about its construction through physical examination of its fabric. The building exhibits an unusual degree of fine brick detailing and specially fabricated components. The retail store in its role as an importer of innovatory materials and products was a link with overseas technology for the local community. The site contains an early electric passenger lift with a fine timber lined lift car. The site has archaeological potential and is likely to contain structural elements and deposits covering a period of Newcastle's history between the 1850s and 1900s, which have potential to yield information unavailable from other sources.

The place is important in demonstrating the principal characteristics of a class of cultural or natural places/environments in New South Wales.

The rear warehouse section is significant as a representative of the relatively small scale warehouse architectural type. The front retailing section is significant as a representative example of an early twentieth century decorative style associated with retailing.
