= Beaumont Street, Newcastle =

Street in Newcastle, Australia

Beaumont Street New South Wales
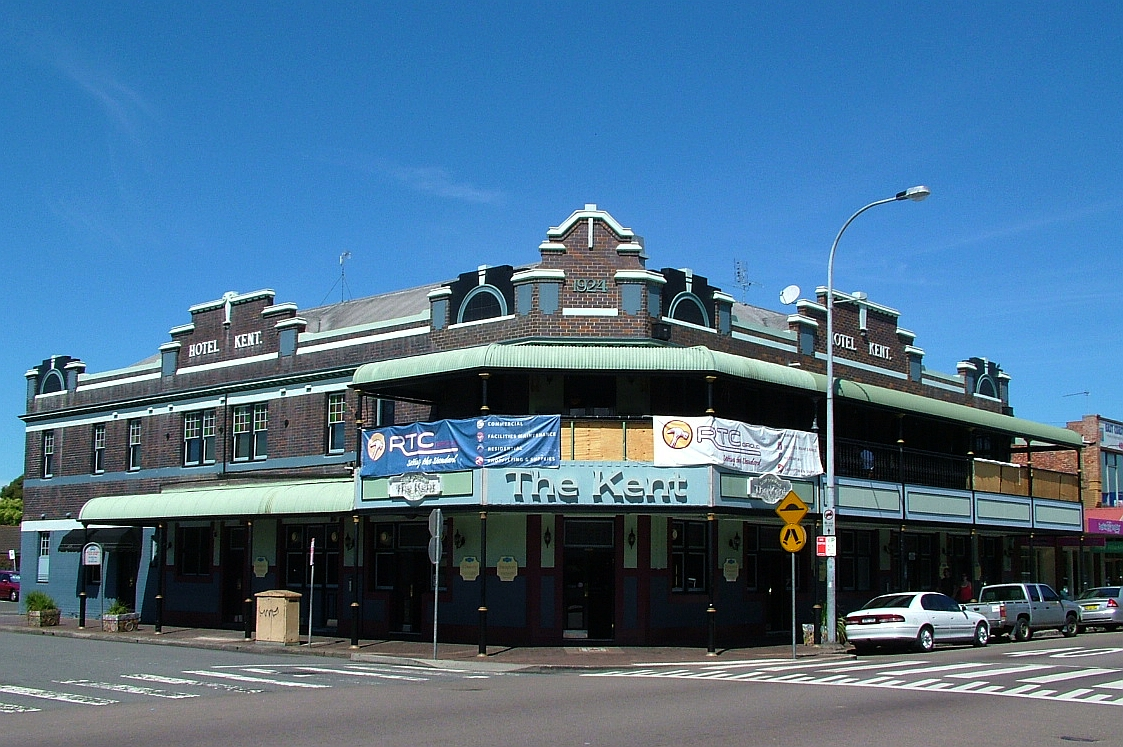
- The Kent Hotel, est. 1924, is a landmark on Beaumont Street
- Coordinates: 32°55′2.4″S 151°44′57.7″E (North end); 32°56′13.5″S 151°44′38.8″E (South end)

General information
- Type: Street
- Location: Newcastle
- Length: 2.3 km (1.4 mi)
- Maintained by: Newcastle City Council

Major junctions
- North end: Maitland Road; Islington, New South Wales
- Donald Street; Tudor Street; Dumaresq Street
- South end: Glebe Road; Hamilton South, New South Wales

Location(s)
- Region: Hunter Region
- LGA(s): City of Newcastle
- Suburb(s): Islington; Hamilton; Hamilton South

Beaumont Street (/ˈboʊmɒnt/ BOH-mont) is a major street in Hamilton Newcastle, Australia running from the Islington antiques district on Maitland Road to Henry Park in Hamilton South. While the southernmost end of the street is primarily residential, the stretch between Tudor and Donald Streets is Newcastle's version of "Little Italy", and a significant site for the Italian community in Newcastle.
