= Hamilton North, New South Wales =

Hamilton North
- Suburb
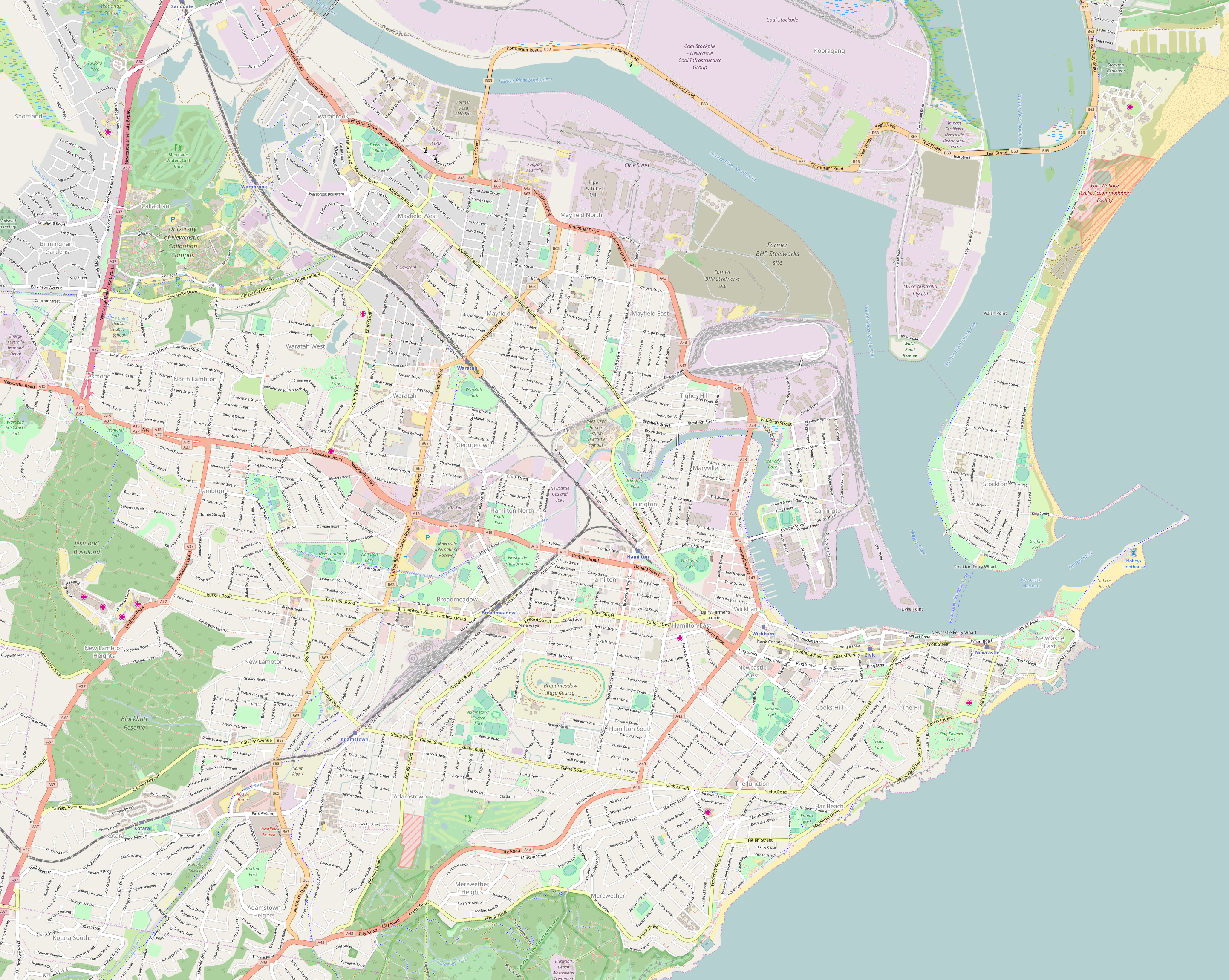
- Coordinates: 32°54′54″S 151°44′10″E
- Country: Australia
- State: New South Wales
- City: Newcastle
- LGA(s): City of Newcastle
- Location: 4 km (2.5 mi) WNW of Newcastle

Government
  - State electorate(s): Newcastle
  - Federal division(s): Newcastle

Area
  - Total: 0.8 km^{2} (0.31 sq mi)

Population
  - Total(s): 934 (SAL 2021)
- Postcode: 2292
- Parish: Newcastle
Suburbs around Hamilton North
Georgetown	Mayfield	Islington
Broadmeadow	Hamilton North	Hamilton
Broadmeadow	Broadmeadow	Hamilton

Hamilton North is an inner suburb of Newcastle, New South Wales, Australia, located 4 kilometres (2.5 mi) west of Newcastle's central business district.
