= Hamilton, New South Wales =

Hamilton
- Suburb
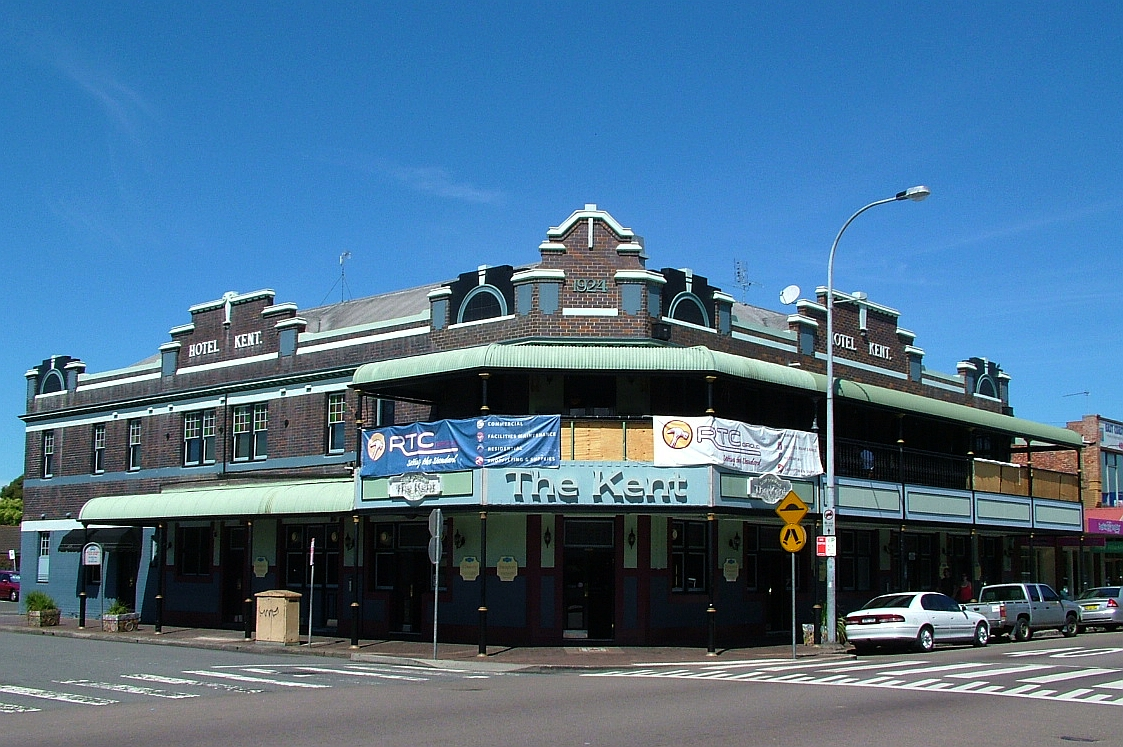
- The Kent Hotel, est. 1924, is a landmark on Beaumont Street

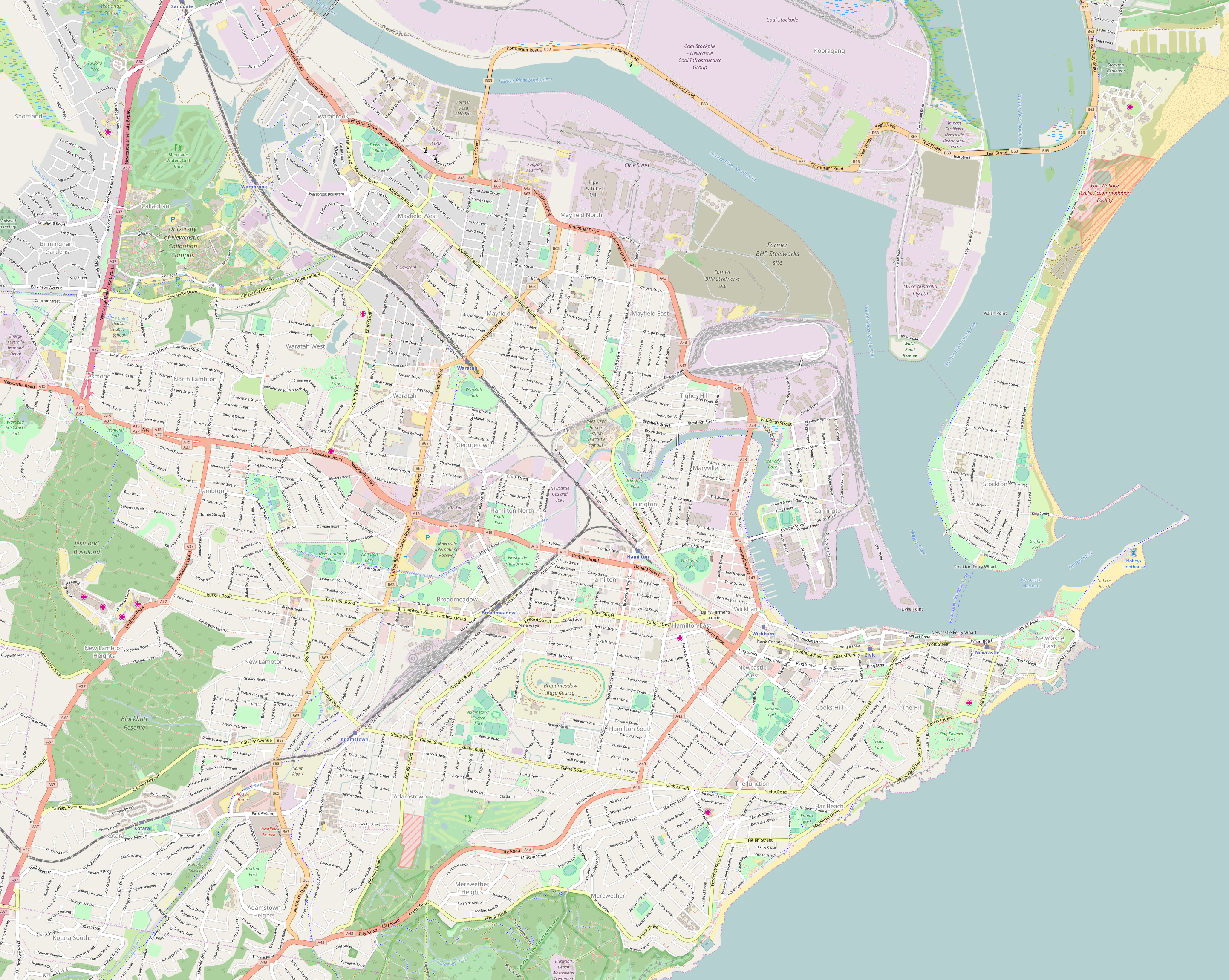
- Interactive map of Hamilton
- Coordinates: 32°54′54″S 151°45′04″E
- Country: Australia
- State: New South Wales
- City: Newcastle
- LGA: City of Newcastle
- Location: 4 km (2.5 mi) W of Newcastle
- Established: 11 December 1871

Government
  - State electorate: Newcastle
  - Federal division: Newcastle

Area
  - Total: 1.4 km^{2} (0.54 sq mi)

Population
  - Total: 4,614 (SAL 2021)
- Postcode: 2303
- Parish: Newcastle
Suburbs around Hamilton
Hamilton North	Islington	Islington
Broadmeadow	Hamilton	Wickham
Broadmeadow	Hamilton South	Hamilton East

Hamilton is a suburb of Newcastle, New South Wales, Australia, located 4 kilometres (2.5 mi) from Newcastle's central business district. The main commercial centre is located around Beaumont Street.

== History ==
The City of Newcastle acknowledges the Awabakal and Worimi peoples as the descendants of the traditional custodians of the land situated within the Newcastle local government area. This includes wetlands, rivers, creeks, and coastal environments. Their heritage and cultural ties to Newcastle are known to date back tens of thousands of years.

Hamilton became a Municipality on 11 December 1871 and was named in honour of Edward Terrick Hamilton, who was the Governor of the board of directors of the Australian Agricultural Company (AA Co) from August 1857 to September 1898. The AA Co. was instrumental in the growth of the area, operating the mines and owning most of the land.

The discovery of coal near St Peter's Church in the area known as Cameron's Hill marked the beginnings of the township of Hamilton (originally known as Pittown, Borehole or Happy Flat). A borehole was sunk and a shaft was completed in 1849 which was known as the D Pit or borehole. Pittown was located in the vicinity of today's Beaumont street to service the needs of the miners and their families.

By 1928, there were over 400 retail outlets in Hamilton, having been an increase from 80 in 1909.

In 1947, Lettesi (a settler group made up of nearly 150 families from the village of Lettopalena in the Abruzzo Region of Italy), initially settled in Islington, but they soon expanded into the nearby suburbs of Hamilton and Mayfield. This was primarily due to Islington's proximity to the BHP steel works. Before long, Hamilton (especially Beaumont Street) became a strong community and commercial centre for Newcastle's Italian community. By the late 1950s, the local Italian community began patronising the Australian owned Exchange Hotel, located on the corner of Beaumont Street and Denison Street. The hotel continues to be a regular meeting place for Italian men of Hamilton. The story of the Lettesi community in Hamilton can be read in the Hidden Hamilton blog.

== Mechanics Institute ==
In the early nineteenth century, a time when education was the privilege of the elite few; Mechanics' Institutes were set up in Britain and later, Australia.· Their aim was to provide working men with access to technical education – through talks, courses, lectures and books, accessible in a reading room. Mechanics Institutes gave many workers access to books and lectures which they could otherwise not afford. By the late 19th and 20th Centuries, institutes such as TAFE and public libraries made Mechanics Institutes less relevant. As source of income, the institute could hold dances, plays, movies and hire out a billiard table which started be replaced by social clubs. The Hamilton Mechanics Institute has architectural significance as a particularly fine and intact example of one in the Renaissance Revival style.

Located between Tudor and Milton Streets, the Hamilton Mechanics Institute was founded in 1859 and the building was constructed in stages between 1869 and 1903. The institute was granted a block of land on Gray Street in 1859, but meetings were first held at a private house and in rented rooms. The Hamilton institute was originally a wooden structure built in 1862, and the first building was a lecture hall designed by the architect JS Jenkins and constructed in 1869. In 1872 this was extended to designs by the local architect William Smith, with a Free Library built west of the lecture hall and separated from it by a wide hallway. In 1872 the originally building was demolished and the façade was replaced across the building. In 1872 saw the building extended and library added by William as well as new facade to Gray Street section to combine to new and old section. In 1879 the Learmonth Memorial Hall was added. In 1879 a large room costing £500 was collect through a memorial to Alexander Learmonth an original trustee. This was replaced in 1888 with a Victorian building designed by renowned Newcastle architect Frederick Menkens. In August 1888 NSW premier Sir Henry Parkes opened the building. In 1891 an extension on the building was completed.

In 1903 two large rooms and lantern lights were added to the back of the building costing £1200. This was added by Frank Hammond. By the early 1920s, membership rose to about 800 members. and the downstairs hall could seat 400 people. In the 1940s Hamilton RSL Sub Branch purchased the property and named in Anzac House.

As was a common characteristic of buildings in the 19th century, the cast iron lace verandahs which were on the building, have not survived. The building was developed by Bernadette and Dan Connolly as part of a redevelopment of the Hamilton RSL. DJB Developments have renovated the buildings there into a 33 unit apartment complex. and the work was completed in January 2018.

== Heritage listings ==
Hamilton has a number of heritage-listed sites, including:

- 195 Denison Street: Australian Agricultural Company Mine Manager's House
- Great Northern railway: Hamilton railway station

== Population ==
Historical population
Year	Pop.	±%
2001	3,959	—
2006	3,711	−6.3%
2011	4,071	+9.7%
2016	4,229	+3.9%
2021	4,614	+9.1%

According to the 2021 census, there were 4,614 people in Hamilton.

- Aboriginal and Torres Strait Islander people made up 2.9% of the population.
- 78.2% of people were born in Australia. The next most common countries of birth included England at 3.0%, followed by India at 1.3%, Italy 1.1%, New Zealand 1.1%, and Nepal 1.0%.
- 84.2% of people spoke only English at home, the next most common languages spoken at home included Greek 1.7%, followed by Italian 1.5%, Macedonian 1.1%, Nepali 0.9%, and Punjabi 0.5%.
- The most common religions included No Religion at 50.5%, Catholicism at 16.7%, Anglicanism at 9.3%, and Eastern Orthodox at 3.8%; a further 5.7% of respondents for this area elected not to disclose their religion.

== Transport ==
=== Rail ===
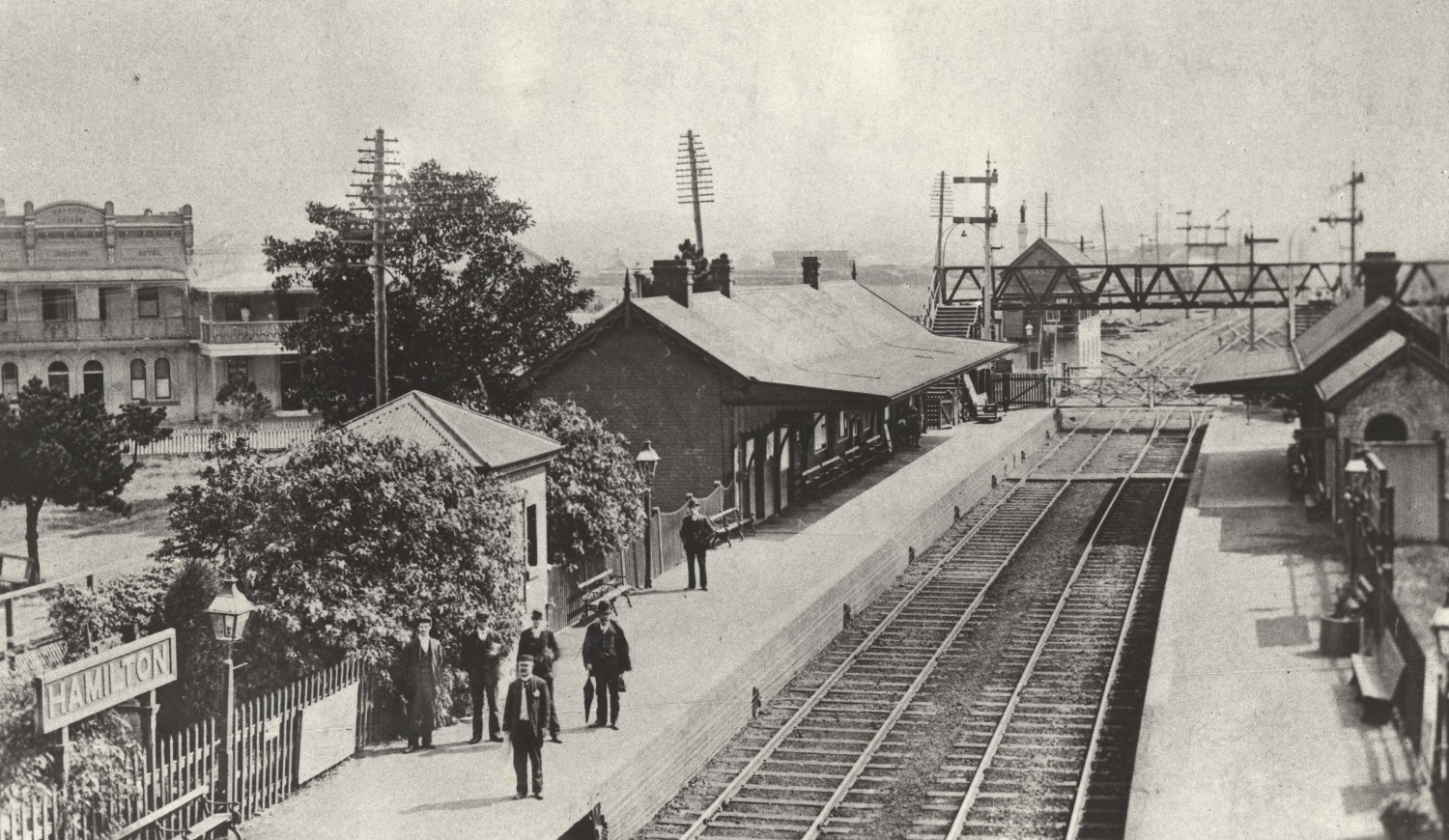
An early undated photo of Hamilton station

Hamilton's train station was constructed on the Islington Junction to Newcastle railway line. The station is 164 km (102 mi) from the Way & Works Branch and is 5.8 m (19 ft) above sea level. With the opening of the station in 1872, the importance of Hamilton as a suburb grew.

The station is served by Sydney Trains Hunter Line to Maitland and beyond, and the Central Coast & Newcastle Line, which runs to Sydney.

=== Bus ===
Hamilton is home to Newcastle Transport's main bus depot.

== Sporting Teams ==
Association football – After a recent name change by the Olympics, Hamilton is only represented by Hamilton Azzurri FC

Rugby union – Represented by Hamilton Hawks.

Rugby League – Represented in the Newcastle & Hunter Rugby League by Hamilton Ducks Rugby League Football Club.

== Gallery ==
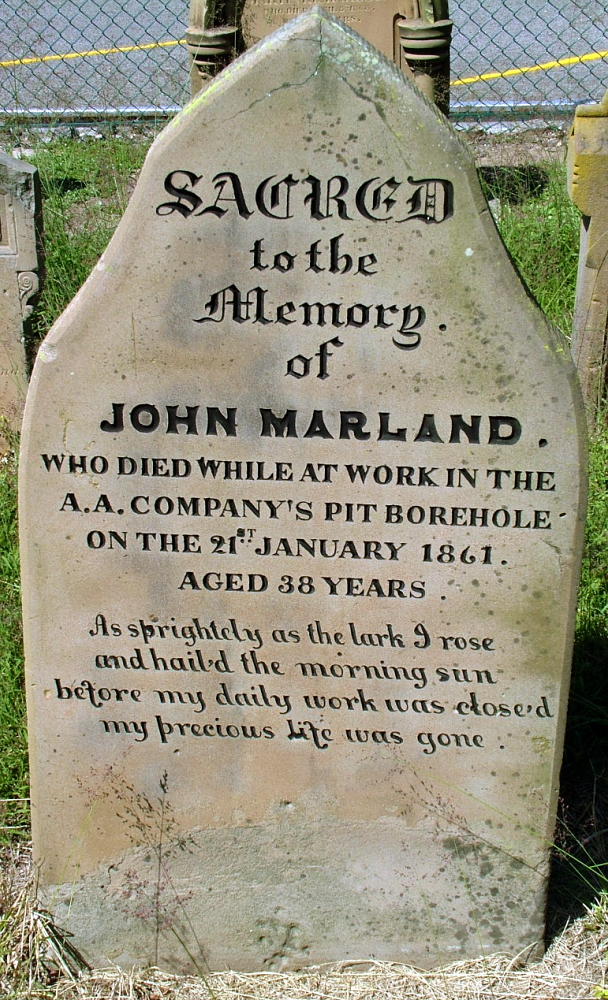
Grave Stone of John Marland, who died whilst working in the Borehole. This grave stone is located behind the Christchurch Cathedral, Newcastle, New South Wales

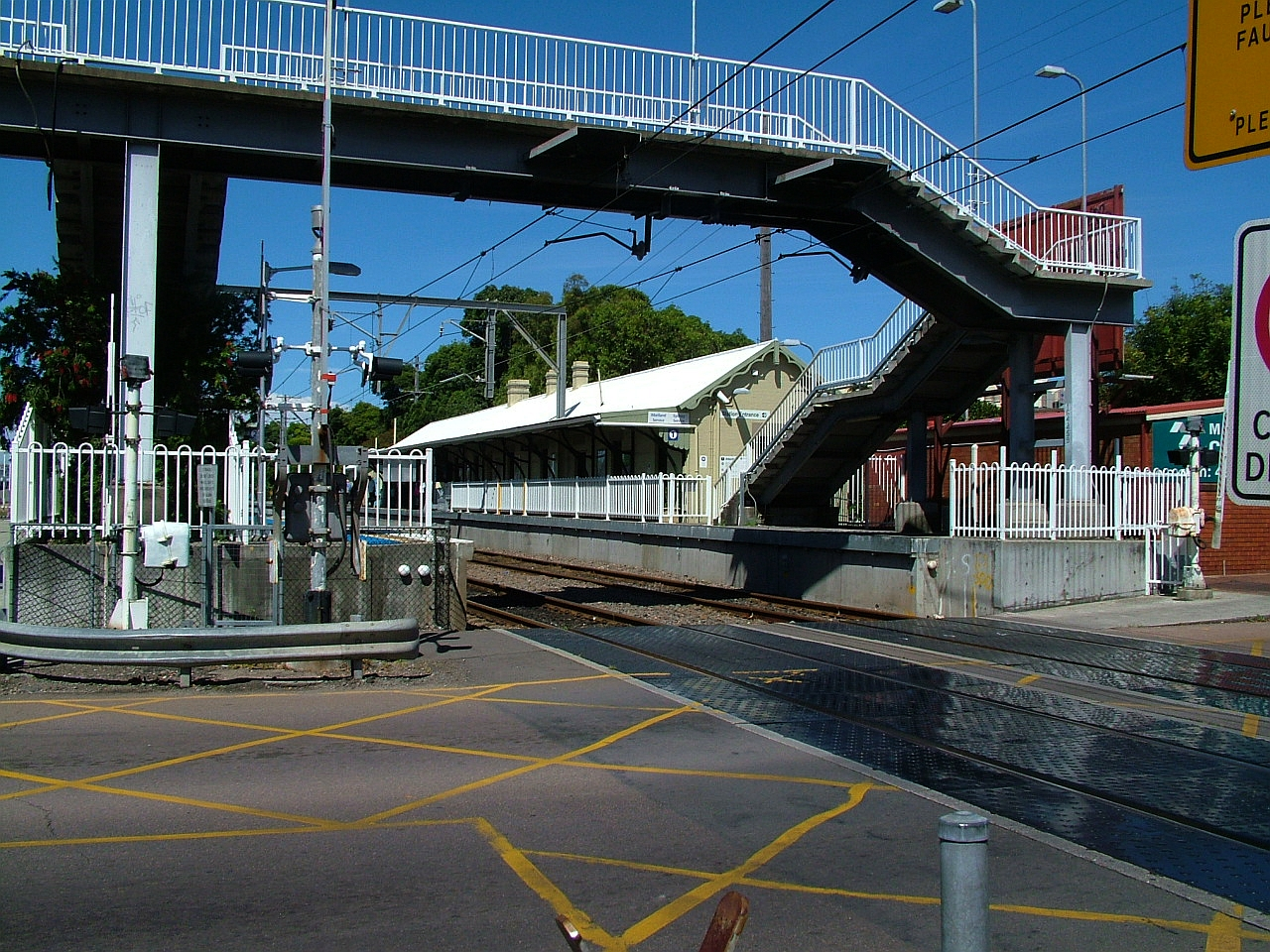
Hamilton train station, located at the Northern end of Beaumont Street.

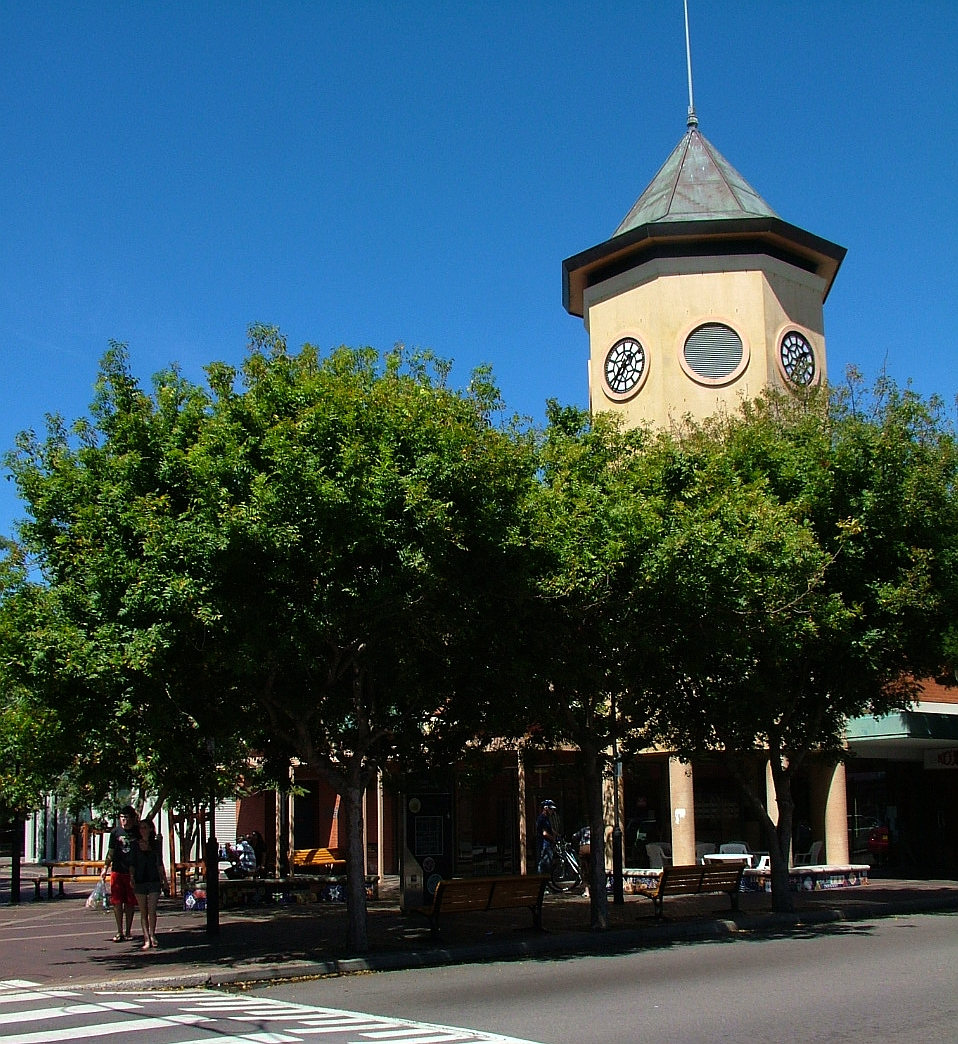
James Street Square separates Beaumont Street from James Street.

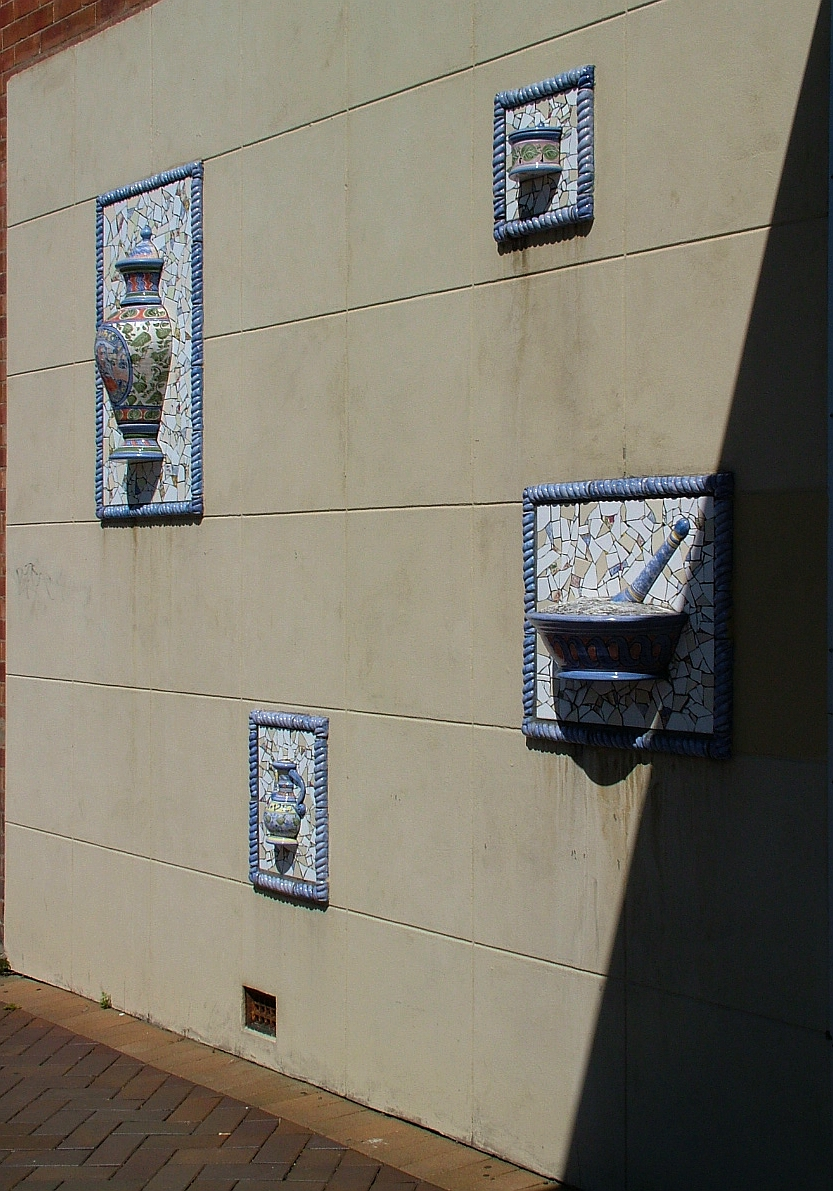
Mosaics on the side of a Hamilton pharmacy.

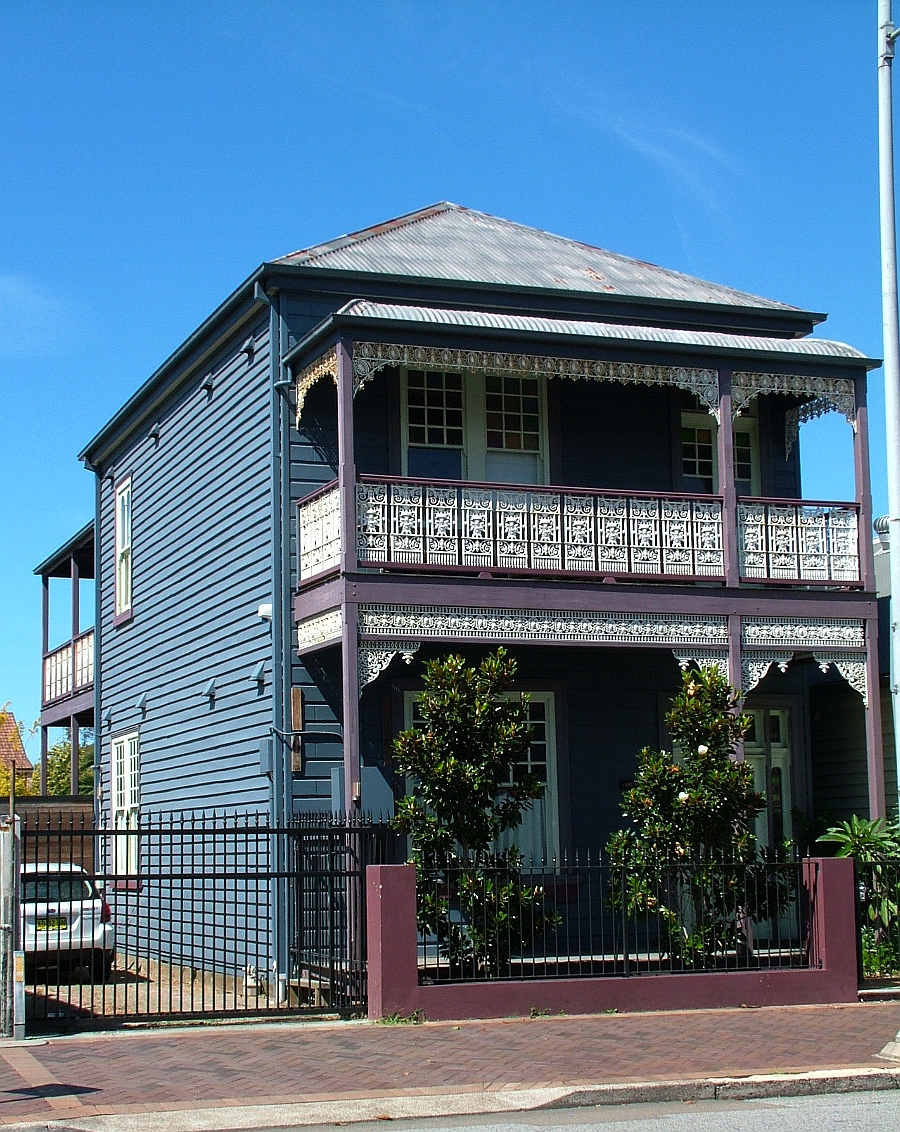
A Victorian townhouse on Beaumont street.
