= Lettopalena =

- Comune
- Comune di Lettopalena
- Location within Italy Location within Abruzzo
- Coordinates: 42°0′N 14°10′E
- Country: Italy
- Region: Abruzzo
- Province: Chieti (CH)

Government
  - Mayor: Carolina De Vitis

Area
  - Total: 20 km^{2} (7.7 sq mi)
- Elevation: 680 m (2,230 ft)

Population (31 March 2017)
  - Total: 349
  - Density: 17/km^{2} (45/sq mi)
- Demonym: Lettopalenesi or Lettesi
- Time zone: UTC+1 (CET)
  - Summer (DST): UTC+2 (CEST)
- Postal code: 66010
- Dialing code: 0872
- Patron saint: St. Vincent Ferrer
- Saint day: 5 April
- Website: Official website

Lettopalena (Abruzzese: Lètte) is a comune and town in the province of Chieti in the Abruzzo region of south-eastern Italy.
