= Wickham, New South Wales =

Wickham
- Suburb
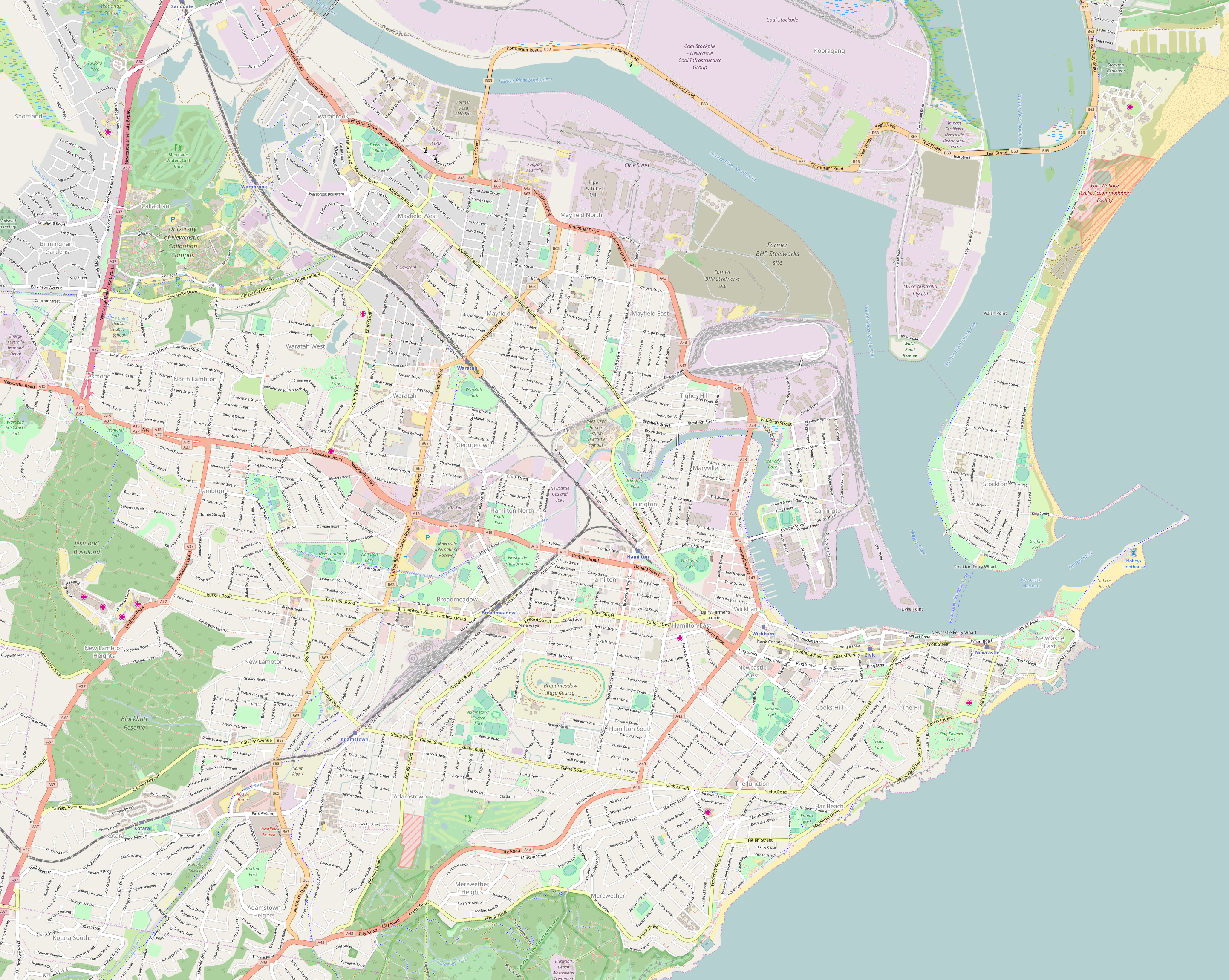
- Interactive map of Wickham
- Coordinates: 32°55′26″S 151°45′36″E
- Country: Australia
- State: New South Wales
- City: Newcastle
- LGA: City of Newcastle
- Location: 3 km (1.9 mi) WNW of Newcastle; 32 km (20 mi) SE of Maitland; 166 km (103 mi) NNE of Sydney

Government
  - State electorate: Newcastle
  - Federal division: Newcastle

Area
  - Total: 0.7 km^{2} (0.27 sq mi)
- Elevation: 6 m (20 ft)

Population
  - Total: 1,637 (SAL 2021)
- Postcode: 2293
- Parish: Newcastle
Suburbs around Wickham
Maryville	Maryville	Carrington
Islington	Wickham	Carrington
Hamilton	Hamilton East	Newcastle West

Wickham /wɪkəm/ is an inner suburb of Newcastle, New South Wales, Australia, located 3 kilometres (1.9 mi) from Newcastle's central business district.

== History ==
The Aboriginal people, in this area, the Awabakal, were the first people of this land.

Wickham is a misspelling of Whickham, a suburb of Newcastle upon Tyne in the north of England. It was proclaimed a Municipality in the NSW Government Gazette, 27 February 1871, largely by the efforts of James Hannell, who became Wickham's first mayor.

== Transport ==
Wickham railway station was served by NSW TrainLink's Central Coast & Newcastle Line and Hunter Line. The railway line is part of the Newcastle–Maitland line, the first section of the Main North line from Sydney to the New England region, opened in 1857. It closed on 25 December 2014, when the Newcastle line was truncated to Hamilton to allow construction of the Newcastle Light Rail line. Newcastle Interchange opened on 15 October 2017. It connects with the Newcastle Light Rail.

== Sport ==
Wickham is a well represented in the Newcastle cricket competitions. The local district team is known as the HamWicks (a combination of the suburbs Hamilton and Wickham).

Two rugby union clubs are also based in Wickham; Hamilton Hawks and Newcastle Griffins. Hamilton Hawks is one of the largest clubs in the Newcastle Premier Rugby competition fielding men's, women's and junior teams. Newcastle Griffins emerged from the former Tech College and Port Hunter clubs and fields a team in the NHRU Divisional competition.

== Gallery ==
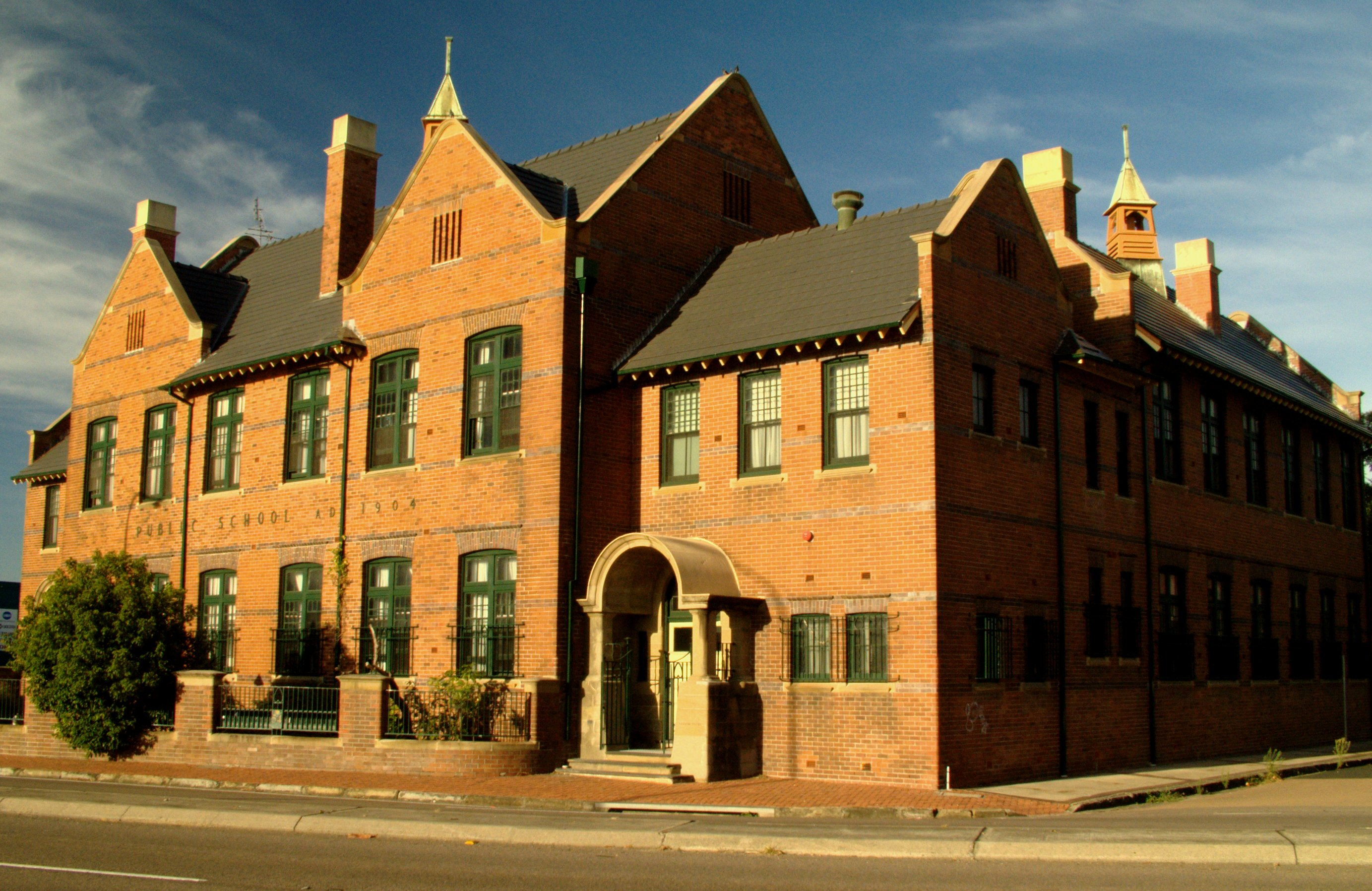
Wickham Public School was built in 1904 and based on the Edwardian style of building.

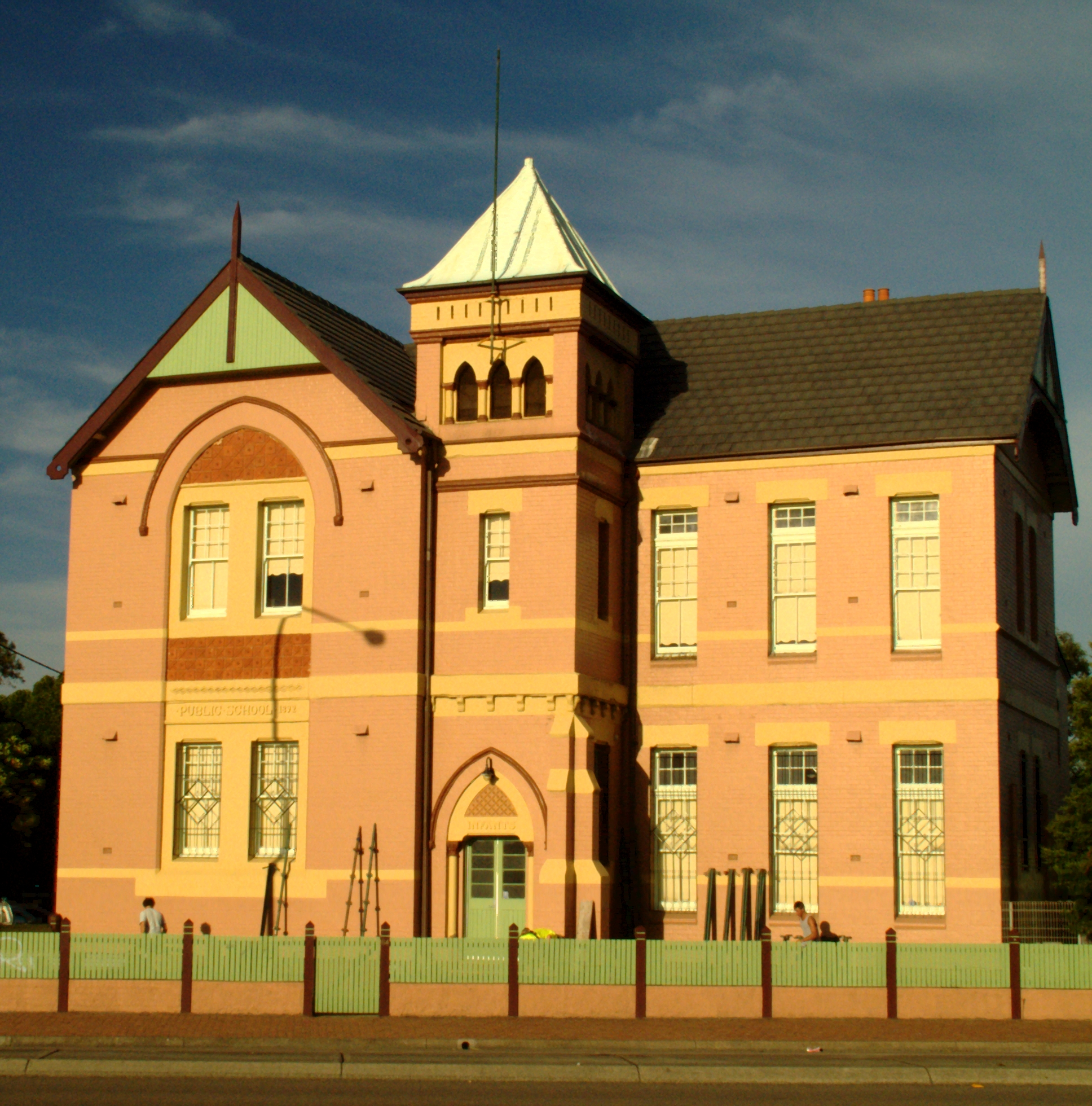
The former infants school was built in 1892, employing elements of the Victorian Gothic and Italianate style.

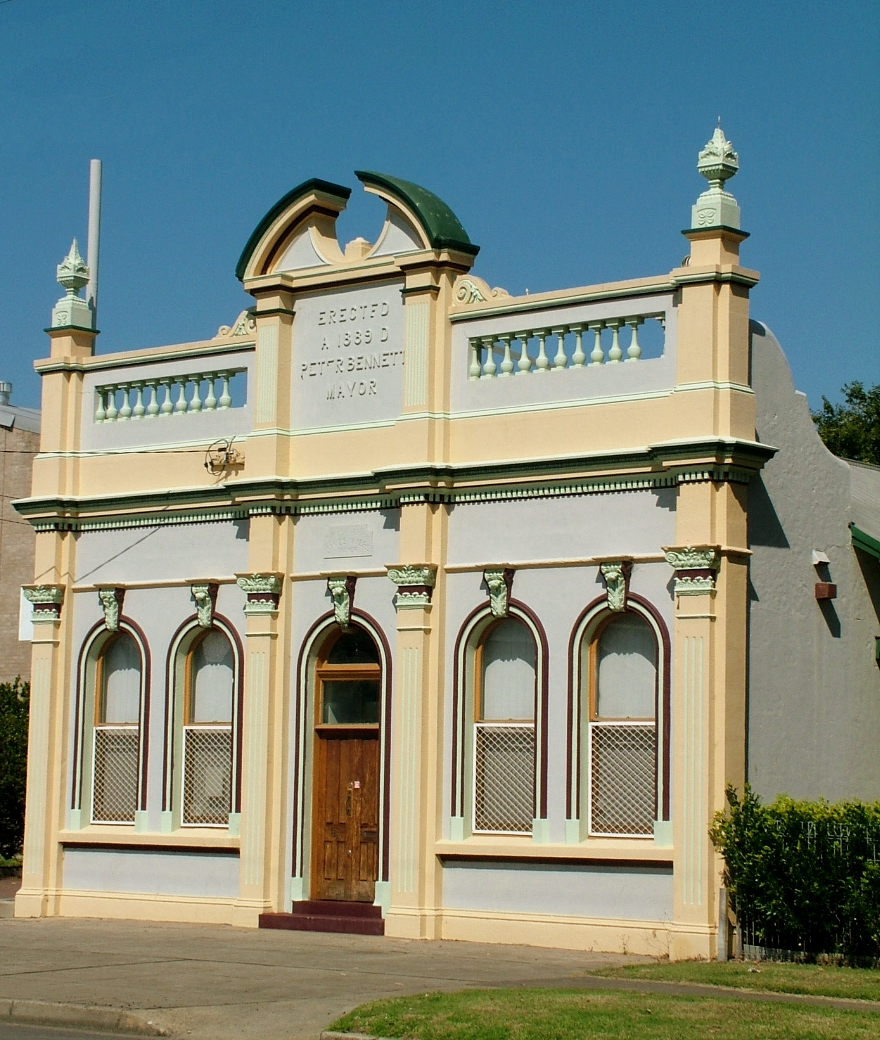
The former Wickham council chambers. Erected in 1889. Now used as the Wickham Preschool
