= Shortland =

The name Shortland may refer to a number of things:

== Geography ==
- Shortland Islands, an archipelago in the Solomon Islands chain
  - Shortland Island, the main island of the Shortlands
- Shortlands, a ward of the London Borough of Bromley
- Shortland, New South Wales
- Shortland's Bluff, an old name for Queenscliff, Victoria, Australia

== People ==
- Cate Shortland (born 1968), a writer and director of film and television.
- Edward Shortland (1812–1893), doctor from New Zealand
- John Shortland (Royal Navy officer) (1739–1803), Royal Navy officer and father of John Shortland
- John Shortland (1769–1810), an explorer of Australia
- Peter Shortland (1815–1888), Royal Navy officer and hydrographic surveyor
- Ryan Shortland (born 1986), a rugby player
- Willoughby Shortland (1804–1869), New Zealand's first Colonial Secretary

== Other ==
- Division of Shortland, an electoral division in Australia
- Shortlands, an electoral division in Solomon Islands
- Shortland Street, a New Zealand soap opera
