= Arthur Havelock =

British colonial administrator (1844–1908)

Sir Arthur Havelock GCSI GCMG GCIE
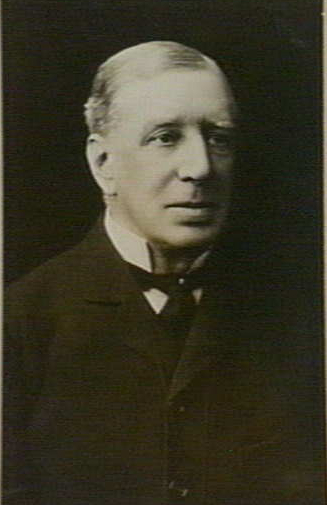

President of Nevis
- In office 6 April 1877 – 1878
- Preceded by: Roger Goldsworthy
- Succeeded by: Charles Spencer Salmon

Governor of Sierra Leone
- In office 27 June 1881 – September 1884
- Monarch: Queen Victoria
- Preceded by: Sir Samuel Rowe
- Succeeded by: Sir Samuel Rowe

35th Governor of Trinidad
- In office 24 January 1885 – 1885
- Preceded by: Sir Sanford Freeling
- Succeeded by: William Robinson

Governor of Natal
- In office 18 February 1886 – 5 June 1889
- Monarch: Queen Victoria
- Preceded by: Sir Henry Bulwer
- Succeeded by: Sir Charles Mitchell

17th Governor of Ceylon
- In office 28 May 1890 – 24 October 1895
- Monarch: Queen Victoria
- Preceded by: Arthur Hamilton-Gordon
- Succeeded by: Edward Noël Walker (Acting governor)

Governor of Madras Presidency
- In office 18 March 1896 – 28 December 1900
- Preceded by: Lord Wenlock
- Succeeded by: Lord Ampthill

Governor of Tasmania
- In office 8 November 1901 – 16 April 1904
- Monarch: Edward VII
- Preceded by: Viscount Gormanston
- Succeeded by: Gerald Strickland

4th Administrator of Saint Lucia
- In office December 1878 – December 1879
- Monarch: Victoria
- Preceded by: William Des Vœux
- Succeeded by: Sir Roger Goldsworth

Personal details
- Born: 7 May 1844 Bath, Somerset, England
- Died: 25 June 1908 (aged 64) Bath, Somerset, England
- Spouse: Anne Grace Norris
- Relations: Sir Henry Havelock (uncle)
- Education: Royal Military College, Sandhurst

Sir Arthur Elibank Havelock, GCSI, GCMG, GCIE (7 May 1844 – 25 June 1908) was a British military officer and colonial administrator. His career including postings as governor of: Sierra Leone (1881-1884), Natal (1886-1889), Ceylon (1890-1895), Madras (1896-1900), and Tasmania (1901-1904).

== Early life and family ==
Havelock was born in 1844 in Bath, Somerset, the fifth surviving son of Lieutenant-Colonel William Havelock and Caroline Elizabeth Chaplin, and the nephew of Sir Henry Havelock. The family moved to India in 1844, where his father commanded the 14th Light Dragoons and was killed in action at the Battle of Ramnagar on 22 November 1848. The Havelocks returned to England briefly, but settled in Ootacamund in 1850, where Havelock attended school until he completed his education in London.

== Military career ==
In 1860, Havelock entered the Royal Military College, Sandhurst, and on 14 January 1862 was gazetted an ensign in the 32nd (Cornwall) Light Infantry. He was promoted lieutenant on 10 April 1866, and was stationed at Gibraltar (1866–7), at Mauritius (1867–8), then at the Cape Colony (1868–72). He returned to Mauritius in 1872 as the colony's paymaster, and was promoted to captain on 1 February 1873, serving as aide-de-camp to Selby Smith, the acting governor, and later to the governor of Mauritius, Sir Arthur Hamilton-Gordon.

Havelock held several key posts in the colonial civil service from 1874: chief civil commissioner of the Seychelles (1874–75), and colonial secretary and receiver general in Fiji (1874–75). He returned to England in 1876, and retired from the British Army as a captain in March 1877.

== Colonial service ==
Havelock joined the colonial civil service upon leaving the army, and was sent to the West Indies in 1877 as President of Nevis. In 1878, he was transferred to Saint Lucia as the colony's Administrator, before returning to the Seychelles as Chief Civil Commissioner.

=== Governor of Sierra Leone ===
In February 1881, Havelock was assigned his first governorship in Sierra Leone and the West African settlements. In addition, he was appointed British consul to Liberia, and became involved in a major border dispute between Liberia and Great Britain. The border between Sierra Leone and Liberia had been unsettled for years, the disputed area – lying between the Sewa and the Mano rivers – known as the Gallinas territory. On 20 March 1882, Havelock led a flotilla of four British gunboats to the Liberian capital Monrovia, issuing a demand that Liberia cede all territories up to the Mafa River, and pay an indemnity of £8,500 to British merchants for injuries inflicted by tribes inhabiting the area of the British claim. A treaty was signed, but its ratification was refused by the Liberian Senate, and Havelock and his gunboats returned to Monrovia in September that year, demanding immediate acknowledgement of the British claims, and ratification of the treaty.

The senate refused once more, and the British quietly occupied the claimed territory in March 1883. Despite the support of the United States, Liberia realised that resisting the British claim was futile, and signed the treaty in London on 22 November 1885. The border was finally settled in 1903 by a mixed commission from both countries.

=== Governor of Trinidad ===
In 1885, Havelock was appointed Governor of Trinidad.

=== Governor of Natal ===
In 1886, Havelock became Governor of Natal, where he dealt with the annexation of Zululand in 1887, and an unsuccessful rebellion led by Dinuzulu kaCetshwayo in 1888. He returned to England in 1889, and served on the international anti-slavery commission in Brussels.

=== Governor of Ceylon ===
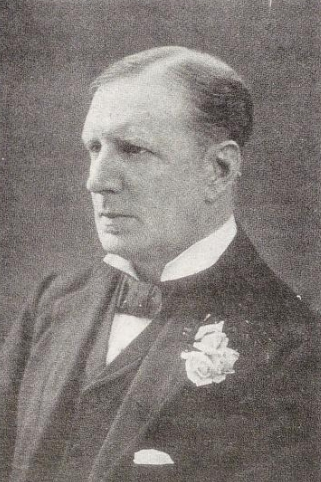

In March 1890, Havelock was appointed Governor of Ceylon (now Sri Lanka), where his actions included extending the country's railways to Kurunegala and Bandarawela, and abolishing the 'paddy tax', a levy on rice cultivation. He was also held in great esteem among the aristocracy of Sri Lanka, with prominent families choosing him to act as godfather to the heirs. One such godson was the grandson of Muadliya Solomnon Carolis de Fonseka. The de Fonseka family renamed their estate, Katukele Greenlands, and other parts within their estate after Havelock, these include Elibank road and Havelock Pass (now forming the bridge).

=== Governor of Madras ===
Havelock returned to his childhood home of India as Governor of Madras from 1896 to 1900.

=== Governor of Tasmania ===
Havelock left Madras in 1901, and was offered the governorships of the Straits Settlements in Malaya and Victoria in Australia, which he declined due to ill health caused by many stressful years in tropical climates. He was then offered the post of Governor of Tasmania, which he accepted in May 1901, arriving in Hobart to be sworn in on 8 November. His health, however, continued to decline and he made the decision to cut short his term as governor to only two-and-a-half years. He notified the premier, William Propsting, of his resignation on 6 January 1904, and left Tasmania on 16 April.

== Later life ==
Havelock returned to England, and retired to Torquay, Devon.

On 15 August 1871, Havelock had married Anne Grace, née Norris, who died in early 1908. Havelock himself died at Bath, Somerset less than six months later on 25 June 1908. He was survived by a daughter.

== Honours ==
- CMG: Companion of the Order of St Michael and St George 1880
- KCMG: Knight Commander of the Order of St Michael and St George 1884
- GCMG: Knight Grand Cross of the Order of St Michael and St George 1895
- GCIE: Knight Grand Commander of the Order of the Indian Empire 16 March 1896 – on appointment as Governor of Madras
- GCSI: Knight Grand Commander of the Order of the Star of India 29 April 1901 – for his services as Governor of Madras

The Havelock Bridge spanning the Godavari River at Rajahmundry, India was named after him in the year 1900. In Woodbrook, a suburb of Port of Spain, Trinidad, Havelock Street is named after him.

Government offices
Preceded by Roger Tuckfield Goldsworthy	President of Nevis; 1877–1878	Succeeded by Charles Spencer Salmon
Preceded by Sir William Des Vœux	Administrator of Saint Lucia; 1878–1879	Succeeded by Sir Roger Goldsworthy
Preceded by Sir Samuel Rowe	Governor of Sierra Leone; 1881–1884	Succeeded by Sir Samuel Rowe
Preceded by Sir Sanford Freeling	Governor of Trinidad; 1885	Succeeded by William Robinson
Preceded by Sir Henry Bulwer	Governor of Natal; 1886–1889	Succeeded by Sir Charles Mitchell
Preceded by Arthur Hamilton-Gordon	Governor of Ceylon; 1890–1895	Succeeded by Edward Noël Walker acting governor
Preceded by Beilby Lawley, 3rd Baron Wenlock	Governor of Madras; 1896–1900	Succeeded by Arthur Russell, 2nd Baron Ampthill
Preceded by Jenico Preston, 14th Viscount Gormanston	Governor of Tasmania; 1901–1904	Succeeded by Sir Gerald Strickland
