= List of colonial governors and administrators of Nevis =

This is a list of viceroys in Nevis from the island's settlement by English in 1628 until its union with Saint Kitts and Anguilla to form Saint Christopher-Nevis-Anguilla in 1883.

== Governors of Nevis (1628–1685) ==
- Anthony Hilton, 1628–1629
- George Hay, 1629–1630
- Anthony Hilton, 1630–1631, second time
- Thomas Littleton, 1631–1634
- Luke Stokes, 1634–1635, first time
- Thomas Sparrow, 1635–1637
- Henry Huncks, 1637–1638
- John Jennings, 1639
- Jenkin Lloyd, 1640
- John Meakem, 1640–1641
- John Kettleby, 1641
- Jacob Lake, 1641–1649
- Luke Stokes, 1649–1657, second time
- James Russell, 1657–1671
- Sir William Stapleton, 1672–1685

== Deputy Governors of Nevis (1672–1737) ==
- Randall Russell, 1672–1676
- William Burt, 1685
- James Russell, 1685–1687
- John Netheway, 1687–1691
- Samuel Gardner, 1692–1699
- Roger Elrington, 1699–1702
- John Johnson, 1703–1706
- Walter Hamilton, 1706–1712
- Daniel Smith, 1712–1722
- Charles Sibourg, 1722–1732
- William Hanmer, 1733–1737

== Presidents of Nevis (1737–1882) ==
- Michael Smith, 1731–1744
- James Symonds, 1745–1756
- William Maynard, 1756–1761
- James Johnston, 1761–1771
- Joseph Richardson Herbert, 1771–1782
- François Claude Amour, Marquis de Bouille, 1782–1783 Governor (French occupation)
- Joseph Richardson Herbert, 1784–1793, restored
- James Daniell, 1807–1840
- Josiah Webbe Maynard, 1840–1841
- Ralph Cleghorn, 1841–1842
- Lawrence Graeme, 1842–1844
- Willoughby J. Shortland, 1845–1854
- Frederick Seymour, 1854–1857
- Sir Arthur Rumbold, 1857–1860
- George Cavell Webbe, 1860–1864
- James Watson Sheriff, 1864–1866
- Charles Monroe Eldridge, 1872–1873
- Alexander Augustus Melfort Campbell, 1873–1876
- Roger Tuckfield Goldsworthy, 1876–1877
- Arthur Elibank Havelock, 1877–1878
- Charles Spencer Salmon, 1879–1882

In 1883 Nevis formed part of Saint Christopher-Nevis-Anguilla, with a president on Saint Christopher (Saint Kitts). For a list of viceroys in Nevis following this, see List of colonial heads of Saint Christopher.
