= John Shortland (Royal Navy officer) =

Royal Navy officer (1739–1803)

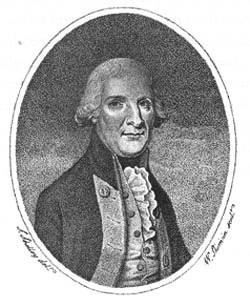
- Born: 1739 near Plymouth, Devon, England
- Died: 1803 (aged 63–64); Lille, France
- Spouse: Margarethe Rutherford (m. 1764)
- Children: John Shortland; Thomas George Shortland
- Relatives: Willoughby Shortland (grandson); Peter Shortland (grandson); Edward Shortland (grandson)
- Military career
- Allegiance: Kingdom of Great Britain
- Branch: Royal Navy
- Rank: Commander

Commander John Shortland (1739–1803) was a Royal Navy officer known for being the agent for transports of First Fleet and for exploring and charting islands in the South Pacific.

== Early life ==
John Shortland was born near Plymouth, England, in 1739, the son of Thomas Shortland.

Entering the Royal Navy as midshipman in 1755. He served under Admiral Edward Boscawen off Newfoundland, under Admiral John Byng off Minorca and under Admiral George Rodney in the West Indies.

== Transport service ==
Promoted to the rank of lieutenant in 1763, he was engaged in the transport service between England and America. He commanded a transport fleet taking reinforcements to the relief of Gibraltar in 1782 and after returning with troops from Halifax in 1786, he was appointed naval agent to the transports of the First Fleet. A large part of the credit for the success of the First Fleet voyage was due to the vigilance and efficiency with which Shortland discharged his responsibilities as Governor Arthur Phillip was detained in London until 11 May 1787, two days before the fleet sailed. He had also procured appointments on the expedition for his sons, John Shortland and Thomas George Shortland.

Shortland after leaving the Cape of Good Hope, with Phillip on HMS Supply with three of the fastest transports, Alexander, Friendship and Scarborough, sailed ahead of the rest of the fleet as an advance party arriving at Botany Bay, Australia, on 17 January 1788. After remaining in Australia until 14 July, he sailed for England in the Alexander, carrying the first dispatches of Governor Phillip to the secretary of state for foreign affairs Francis Osborne, accompanied by the Borrowdale, Prince of Wales and Friendship.

During the voyage via Batavia, Shortland discovered and charted many islands and reefs. He named New Georgia, an island in the Solomons archipelago, when his ship, the Alexander, passed by it in August 1789. He named the Treasury Islands, named a strait Shortland Strait, an island Shortland Island, and island group Shortland Islands after himself. During the trip to Batavia, the Friendship was scuttled near Borneo after crew numbers were reduced by scurvy. Shortland arrived back in England in May 1789. He strongly urged the Admiralty to have the eastern coast of Australia properly charted, and as a result the Secretary of State for Foreign Affairs dispatched Matthew Flinders in HMS Investigator.

== Later life and legacy ==
Shortland was promoted to commander in 1790 and, after further active service, retired to Lille, France, where he died in 1803. He was survived by his widow, two sons and two daughters. John Shortland is often confused with his son John Shortland, also a fine seaman. One mistake occurred on the celebration of the son's discovery of the Hunter River, and a second, on the 150th anniversary of the same event, when the Postmaster-General's Department issued a stamp that showed the face of the father instead of the son.

== Family ==
On 5 July 1764 he married Margarethe Rutherford at Whitechapel, Middlesex. A daughter, Jane Shortland, was born about 1765 and her sister Peggy Shortland followed two years later. Son John Shortland arrived in 1769 and Thomas George Shortland in 1771.

== Bibliography ==
- Historical Records of New South Wales, vols. 1–4
- Historical Records of Australia, Series I, vols. 1–2
- Hunter, J., An Historical Journal of the Transactions at Port Jackson and Norfolk Island (Lond, 1793)
- Tench. W., A Narrative of the Expedition to Botany Bay (Lond, 1789)
- "Memoir of the Public Services of the Late Captain John Shortland, of the Royal Navy", Naval Chronicle, vol 24, 1810, pp. 1–21
- Bonwick transcripts, biography (State Library of New South Wales)
