= Shorland (disambiguation) =

The Shorland armoured car was a vehicle built by Short Brothers and Harland for the Royal Ulster Constabulary.

Shorland may also refer to

- Shorland S600, a later version of the Shorland armoured car
- Shorland (album), by Moke, 2007
- Anne Gertrude Shorland, New Zealand lawyer, and judge 1987–2002
- Brian Shorland (1909–1999), New Zealand organic chemist
  - Shorland Medal, a science research award named after Brian Shorland
- 16599 Shorland, a minor planet

== See also ==
- Shortland (disambiguation)
