= Newcastle Grammar School =

Newcastle Grammar School may refer to:

- Newcastle Grammar School, New South Wales, Australia
- Royal Grammar School, Newcastle upon Tyne, England
