= Newcastle Grammar School, New South Wales =

School in Newcastle, Australia

Newcastle Grammar School
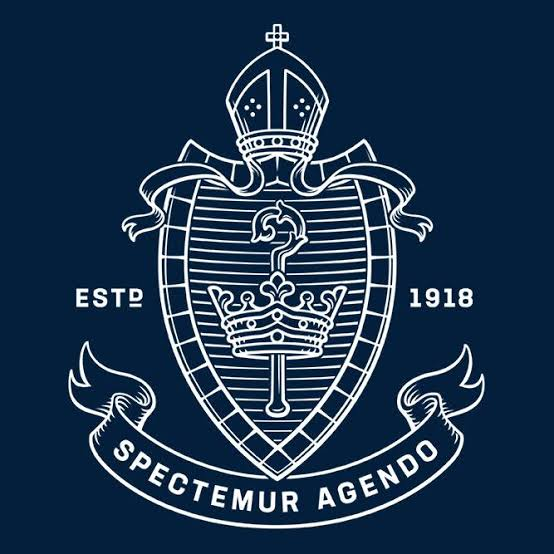

Location
- Newcastle, New South Wales; Australia; 32°55′47″S 151°46′50″E

Information
- Former names: Newcastle Boys' Grammar School; Newcastle Church of England Girls' Grammar School
- Type: Independent co-educational non-selective primary and secondary day school
- Motto: Latin: Spectemur Agendo (Let us be judged by our actions)
- Religious affiliation: Anglican Diocese of Newcastle
- Denomination: Anglicanism
- Established: 1859–1902 (as Newcastle Boys' Grammar School); 22 July 1918; 108 years ago (as Newcastle Church of England Girls' Grammar School)
- Educational authority: NSW Department of Education
- Head of school: Matthew Macoustra
- Teaching staff: c. 100
- Years offered: K–12
- Enrolment: c. 1100
- Hours in school day: 8:25am-3:05pm
- Campus: Park: Union Street and Parkway Ave, Cooks Hill (Early learning to Year 4); Hill: Church and Newcomen Street, Newcastle (Year 5 to Year 12)
- Campus type: Suburban
- Houses: Hunter; Macquarie; Shortland; Tyrrell
- Colours: Navy, Sky blue
- Affiliations: Association of Heads of Independent Schools of Australia; Junior School Heads Association of Australia; Association of Independent Schools of New South Wales
- Website: www.ngs.nsw.edu.au

The Newcastle Grammar School is a dual-campus independent Anglican co-educational non-selective primary and secondary day school, located in Newcastle, New South Wales, Australia.

== History ==
Newcastle Boys’ Grammar School opened on the present site in 1859 in Berkeley House and operated until 1902.

Newcastle Church of England Girls’ Grammar School was officially opened on 22 July 1918 with an enrolment of fifty-six girls. However, the school was briefly relocated away from the Coast during World War II.

The control and administration of the School was given by the Anglican Diocese of Newcastle to The Pittwater House Schools in 1976 until the end of 1991, and in 1978, boys were once again enrolled at the School.

In 1992, the School's administration was returned to Newcastle and Newcastle Grammar School is now governed by Newcastle Grammar School Limited, a non-profit company limited by guarantee.

In 2018, Newcastle Grammar School celebrated its centenary.

In 2022, Newcastle Grammar School changed its uniform for the first time in 30 years.

== Affiliations ==
Newcastle Grammar School is affiliated with the Anglican Diocese of Newcastle, the Association of Heads of Independent Schools of Australia (AHISA), the Independent Primary School Heads of Australia (IPSHA), the Association of Independent Schools of New South Wales (AISNSW) and Hunter Region Independent Schools (HRIS).

== Campuses ==
Newcastle Grammar School is situated on two campuses.

=== Park Campus ===
This is located in Cooks Hill, approximately 2 km (1.2 mi) from the Hill Campus. Park Campus students start in kindergarten and they benefit from a number of specialist spaces, including a library, music room and computer rooms. The Sandi Warren Performance Centre is used for musical productions, assemblies, physical education lessons, lectures and dinners. Park Campus is across from National Park which has sports facilities such as netball/basketball courts and large soccer fields. In addition, Park Campus currently caters for students up to Year 6, after which they move to Hill Campus.

=== Hill Campus ===
Located on The Hill overlooking the city of Newcastle, this campus caters for students from Year 7 to Year 12 in a mix of historic and modern buildings. The areas of Hill Campus have names associated with various figures that contributed to the founding and leadership of Newcastle Grammar School and Newcastle. On the east side of the school are the two areas of the courts, which are used for physical education, and Stewart building, housing the offices of the PE department, as well as language (Japanese, French, and Mandarin) and PDHPE classrooms. The west side of the school is the Merrick Courtyard which acts as a sitting area for students and location of the Hill Campus canteen, art rooms, Year 7 student lockers and office area for the Heads of House for Years 7–12. The Parnell building has lockers, science labs, music basement, maths classrooms, the STEM department office and the Tyrrell Library, which is also the site of the offices for the Languages and Literacy department. The Hill Building is a four-story building, home to the english, global studies, cooking, and lecturing rooms. The roof of Hill has vegetable garden beds, and is otherwise used for special events. Merrick is also home to the Year 12 common rooms, including a kitchen. The Hill basement is used for TAS subjects such as Technology, iSTEM and woodwork. Dividing the school into east and west is the Horbury Hunt Hall, used for assemblies and functions. Furthermore, many CAPA (Creative and performing arts) classes are held in an external building called the Bolton Building.

== Notable alumni ==
=== Media and arts ===
- Susie Porter – Australian actress

=== Politics and government ===
- Walter Bingle - head of the Department of Works and Railways
- Ross Cadell – Australian senator for NSW (National Party)
- Andrew Gee MP – Member in House of Representatives (Independent)
- James Cobb White - grazier and politician

== Heads ==
Name	Years active	Title
Rev. E. K. Yeatman	1853–unknown	Headmaster
Rev. H. Shaw Millard	Unknown	Headmaster
Miss M. E. Lawrence	1918–1932	Headmistress
Miss Zoe E. Martin	1933–1951	Headmistress
Miss M. Roberts	1952–1959	Headmistress
Miss E. Heath	1960–1964	Headmistress
Miss L. Thompson	1965–1967	Headmistress
Mrs Kathleen Stewart	1968–1976	Headmistress
Mr R. H. Morgan	1977–1991	Executive Principal
Mr D. Lloyd	1977	Headmaster
Mr A. Coombes	1978–1985	Headmaster
Mr B. L. Charlton	1986–1988	Headmaster
Mr Alan G. Green	1989–2014	Headmaster
Mrs Erica Thomas	2014–2022	Head of School
Mr Matthew Macoustra	2023–	Head of School
