= Port Morant =

Town in Jamaica

Coordinates: 17°54′N 76°19′W

Port Morant is a town in Saint Thomas Parish, southeastern Jamaica. It was, in the early years of European settlement, one of the island's chief ports, with export of bananas and production of rum being major industries. Following the English conquest of Jamaica in 1655, General Luke Stokes arrived from Nevis with 1,600 people who settled near Port Morant in 1656.
