= Willoughby Shortland =

British naval officer and colonial administrator (1804–1869)

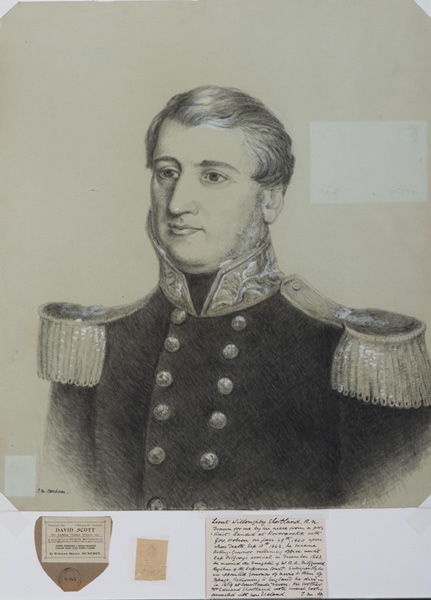
- Portrait of Willoughby Shortland drawn by his niece.

1st Colonial Secretary of New Zealand
- In office 3 May 1841 – 31 December 1843
- Governor: William Hobson

Personal details
- Born: 30 September 1804 Plymouth, Devonshire, England
- Died: 7 October 1869 (aged 65) Courtlands, Kingsbridge, Devon, England
- Resting place: St. Mary's Churchyard, Churchstow, South Hams, Devon, England
- Spouse: Isabella Kate Johnston
- Relatives: Edward Shortland (brother); Peter Shortland (brother); John Shortland (uncle); John Shortland (grandfather)
- Occupation: Royal Navy officer, colonial administrator
- Military career
- Alma mater: Royal Naval College
- Allegiance: United Kingdom
- Branch: Royal Navy
- Service years: 1818–1869
- Rank: Commander
- Served on: HMS Redpole, 1823– HMS Ocean, 1824– HMS Blanche, 1824– HMS Wellesley, 1825– HMS Heron, 1826–1827; HMS Blanche, 1827– HMS Victor, 1827– HMS Melville, 1828– HMS Galatea, 1828– HMS Ranger, 1829– HMS Monkey, 1830– HMS Kangaroo, 1830– HMS Skipjack, 1831–1833
- Commands: HMS Monkey, 1830; HMS Skipjack, 1831–1833

Commander Willoughby Shortland (30 September 1804 – 7 October 1869) was a British naval officer and colonial administrator. He was New Zealand's first Colonial Secretary from 1841, after having arrived in New Zealand with Lieutenant Governor William Hobson in January 1840. He was later President of the island of Nevis and then Governor of Tobago.

== Early life and naval career ==
Shortland, born in 1804, was the son of Captain Thomas George Shortland and Elizabeth Tonkin. His brothers were Edward Shortland and Peter Frederick Shortland. Willoughby was educated at the Royal Naval College, and entered the service on 9 January 1818. Being gazetted a lieutenant on 18 August 1828, he served in Galatea, 42 guns, and in the following year in Ranger, 28 guns, on the Jamaica station. His first command, in 1830, was the schooner Monkey. From her, on 21 March 1831, he took command of Skipjack, a schooner of 5 guns, and in her remained in the West Indies until June 1833.

In 1864, he was gazetted as a retired commander on the retired list as of 29 September.

== Colonial work ==
=== New Zealand ===
In 1839 he accompanied Captain William Hobson, the first governor of New Zealand, to that colony, which had not then been annexed by the United Kingdom. Lieutenant Shortland was appointed colonial secretary and a magistrate. An early court case related to the murder of European shepherd (Patrick Rooney) by Ngāpuhi known as Kihi, who was discovered and delivered up by other Ngāpuhi to the authorities at Kororāreka. Shortland was in the act of a magisterial examination of the charge against Kihi on 20 April 1840 when Haratua, a chief arrived with about three hundred armed warriors and began a haka. Shortland, believing the warriors had hostile intentions, sent for the troops. Edward Marsh Williams, who was present as a witness and who spoke Māori and understood Māori culture identified that Haratua and the warriors did not have any hostile intentions, having come over to make a public display of their abhorrence of the murder. Edward Williams persuaded Haratua and the warriors to leave and explained in a quiet way that it was ignorance of Māori culture on Shorthand's part that made him call for the troops.

Shortland proceeded to Port Nicholson, Wellington, and the English living there very willingly acknowledged Queen Victoria's authority and Shortland's nomination as their police magistrate. Shortland was appointed the first colonial secretary on 3 May 1841 and a member of the General Legislative Council courtesy of his post.

On the death of Captain Hobson on 10 September 1842, the lieutenant administered the government of New Zealand until the arrival of Captain Robert FitzRoy on 31 December 1843.

==== The Tauranga Campaign of 1842 ====
In 1842, soon after Governor Hobson's death, Acting Governor Shortland sought to interfere in an intertribal war of ancient origins at Tauranga and Maketu, Bay of Plenty, to put an end to such perpetual wars. A military force under Major Thomas Bunbury, 80th Regiment, was transported from Auckland to Tauranga by the Colonial Brig Victoria, under a pretext of the two tribes having respectively seized two boats belonging to Englishmen trading there. They disembarked at Mount Maunganui and built a camp at Hopukiore / Mount Drury. The warring tribes objected to the Government's right to interfere in their wars, and Shortland, finding intervention questionable and that his military force was very small, prompted some kind of mediation and withdrew the troops. No actual fighting took place. This was the first occasion on which the troops were called out on campaign in New Zealand, and perhaps the last occasion in which Māori ate some of their prisoners.

==== The Wairau Affray ====
During Shortland's temporary government the Wairau Affray took place on 17 June 1843, and in his dispatches to the British government he expressed his disapproval of the conduct of the settlers, to which he attributed the massacre. This action made him unpopular, and, when a report of his nomination as Governor of New Zealand was circulated, a petition was sent from Auckland praying that he might not be appointed. On 31 December 1843 he was dismissed from the colonial secretaryship by FitzRoy.

=== Nevis and Tobago ===
In 1845 became President of the island of Nevis in the Leeward Islands. After that, he was Governor of Tobago from 10 January 1854 until 1856, and then, returning to England, resided on his property, Courtlands, Charleton, Kingsbridge, Devon, until his death.

== Family and death ==
He married, in 1841 in Auckland, Isabella Kate Johnston, daughter of Robert A. Fitzgerald of Geraldine, County Limerick. He died at Courtlands on 7 October 1869.

== See also ==
- List of colonial governors and administrators of Nevis
- List of colonial governors and administrators of Tobago
- O'Byrne, William Richard (1849). "Shortland, Willoughby" . A Naval Biographical Dictionary . John Murray – via Wikisource.

Government offices
New office	Colonial Secretary of New Zealand; 1841–1843	Succeeded by Andrew Sinclair
