= Roger Goldsworthy (colonial administrator) =

British colonial administrator (1839-1900)

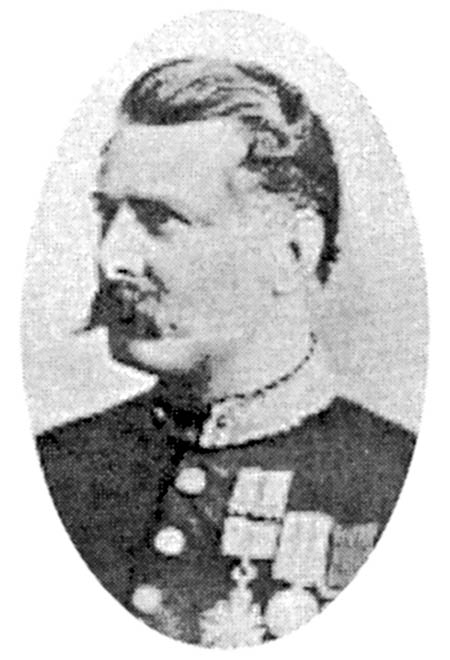
Sir Roger Tuckfield Goldsworthy

Sir Roger Tuckfield Goldsworthy KCMG (1839 – 6 May 1900) was a British colonial administrator.

== Biography ==
Roger Goldsworthy was born in Marylebone, Middlesex in 1839, and educated at Sandhurst, the younger brother of Major-General Walter Tuckfield Goldsworthy MP (1837–1911). He joined his father and brother in Calcutta in 1855 and later joined the volunteer cavalry known as Havelock's Irregulars. During the Indian rebellion of 1857 he won medals and was mentioned in dispatches. In 1859 he was commissioned as a lieutenant in the 17th Lancers. He resigned in 1866.

From 1868 to 1870, Goldsworthy was Inspector General of Police in Sierra Leone; during this time he married a widow named Eliza Egan. He was then commandant of the Hausa Armed Police and District Magistrate of Lagos until 1873. He then became Inspector of Customs for the Gold Coast until 1874. In 1874 he was made CMG for his role in the war with the Akumahs. His next appointment was as President of Nevis from 1876 to 1877.

In 1877, Goldsworthy was appointed Colonial Secretary of Western Australia, a position which also implied an appointment to the Western Australian Legislative Council. He took up both appointments on 30 August 1877, holding them until his resignation on 7 September 1880. Following this, he was Administrator and Colonial Secretary of Saint Lucia from 1881 to 1884; Governor and Commander-in-Chief of the British Honduras from 1884 to 1891; and Governor of the Falkland Islands from 1891 to 1897.

Goldsworthy was made KCMG in 1889. He died on 6 May 1900.

== General references ==
- Black, David; Bolton, Geoffrey (2001a). Biographical Register of Members of the Parliament of Western Australia. Vol. One: 1870–1930 (Revised ed.). Parliament House: Parliament of Western Australia. ISBN 0730738140.

Government offices
Preceded by Alexander Augustus Melfort Campbell	President of Nevis; 1876–1877	Succeeded by Arthur Elibank Havelock
Preceded by Anthony O'Grady Lefroy	Colonial Secretary of Western Australia; 1877–1880	Succeeded by Edric Gifford
Preceded by Arthur Elibank Havelock	Administrator of Saint Lucia; 1881–1884	Succeeded by Edward Laborde
Preceded by Irwin Charles Maling	Administrator of Grenada; 1882–1883	Succeeded by Edward Laborde
Preceded by Robert William Harley as Lieutenant Governor of British Honduras	Governor of British Honduras; 1884–1891	Succeeded by Cornelius Alfred Moloney
Preceded by Thomas Kerr	Governor of the Falkland Islands; 1891–1897	Succeeded by Sir William Grey-Wilson
