= Ralph Brush Cleghorn =

West Indian politician

Ralph Brush Cleghorn (1804—March 7, 1842) was a formerly enslaved abolitionist from St. Kitts who served as president of the Council of Nevis, probably the first black British West Indian to lead a colony.

== Early life ==
Ralph Cleghorn was born in St. Kitts about 1804 to Margaret Steele, an enslaved woman of African descent, and Robert Cleghorn, a white attorney who would later be elected to the island's legislature. He remained on the island until he was five years old, when his father took him to England for an education. The circumstances of his manumission are not clear.

Cleghorn returned to St. Kitts in 1823 and on July 22, 1824, married a free colored woman, Maria Berkeley. About the time of his marriage, Cleghorn's father died and between the two events, he became the owner of "in all 14 or 15" enslaved people. With his inheritance and the help of English friends, Cleghorn opened a store in Saint George Basseterre parish, probably in the capital city, selling imported goods that initially earned him £1,200 per year. Within a few years, he was the wealthiest free colored man in Basseterre.

== Abolitionism and Activism ==
As a wealthy, slave-owning merchant, Cleghorn did not initially join the abolitionist movement on St. Kitts. His surviving letters do not explain his conversion to the cause. Initially, it may have been self-interest. In 1825, free colored residents of St. Kitts were given the right to vote, but the legislation did not allow them to run for elective office. Three years later, Cleghorn signed a petition of free colored residents seeking the right to hold office, and his compatriots selected him to go to England to make their case. He met Zachary Macaulay, a radical member of parliament and a leader of the British abolitionist movement, who became Cleghorn's supporter in England. On his return to St. Kitts, Cleghorn took up the abolitionist cause and spent the rest of his life advocating for the civil rights of British African-Caribbean people. One of his first acts was to free his own slaves and to convince his sister-in-law to free hers.

Cleghorn's political activism cost him his business. He explained in a letter to Macaulay that the "white population (planters) who are of course the only buyers" were boycotting his store, determined "not to purchase a single article at my Establishment." His opposition to slavery had other financial risks. In the late 1820s, an enslaved woman on St. Kitts, Betto Douglass, attempted to use the court system to gain her freedom. Douglass was unsuccessful, and her case became a rallying cry for the anti-slavery movement which raised funds to purchase her freedom. Douglass's enslaver refused to sell her, and she went into hiding. Ralph Cleghorn supported Douglass for four years at the risk of a 12s. per day fine, which would have bankrupted him.

Under the 1833 Abolition Act, most slaves in the British Empire were converted to apprentices, who were more like involuntary indentured servants who had to continue working for their former owners for four to six years. (The owners of slaves also received compensation from the government). Cleghorn accurately predicted that this graduated path to freedom would not go over well. "My decided opinion is, that the Slaves will not be easily brought to agree to any plan which shall preclude their unrestricted admission to entire Emancipation, especially the emancipation of the will—enabling them to select their own employers."

Cleghorn's prediction proved accurate. Follower their conversion to apprentices, the formerly enslaved people throughout St. Kitts went on strike and walked off of the plantations to camp in the mountains. The colonial governor declared martial law and used soldiers and the local militia to force the apprentices to return to work.

== Government Positions ==
Following the failure of his business and perhaps with the help of his abolitionist allies in England, like Macaualay and Dr. Stephen Lushington, Cleghorn embarked on a career of government service. In 1833, he and Nicholas J. Lynch were the first free colored men elected to the St. Kitts legislature. He also secured a position as stipendary magistrate on the island. Cleghorn used his new legal authority to adjudicate disputes between former slaves and their former owners. His favorable attitude toward the formerly enslaved apprentices created animosity between Cleghorn and white planters, who persuaded the St. Kitts assembly to try to dismiss him from his post. They were unsuccessful.

By 1838, after years of working for a fraction of his former earnings, Cleghorn's wealth was exhausted and some of his assets were seized to pay his debts. He had to leave his position as an elected member of the St. Kitts assembly because he no longer met the property requirements for elective office. He continued to work as a magistrate while taking on the unpaid job of Inspector of Prisons. As before, he used his position to defend the rights of black St. Kittitians, advocating for female matrons to supervise the imprisoned women and giving first offenders the chance to work.

In October 1841, the British government appointed Cleghorn to the presidency of the Council of Nevis, the highest official post on the island adjacent to his native St. Kitts. The dominant white population of the island reacted immediately with hostility. One resident objected to the new president, referring to him as "a coloured man, the illegitimate son of a negro slave."

Cleghorn's tenure lasted just six months. He antagonized the white planters on Nevis when he overturned a prison sentence given to a black laborer. The council retaliated by refusing to approve his presidential salary. Cleghorn died suddenly on March 17, 1842, in the middle of his disputes with the council. A friend of Cleghorn's said, "he was positively badgered to death by the white people of Nevis." He "smiled at their abuse in public, and behaved with a most quiet and dignified forbearance, and then went home and mourned and brooded till it killed him."
