= Woodlands, Newcastle =

Woodlands
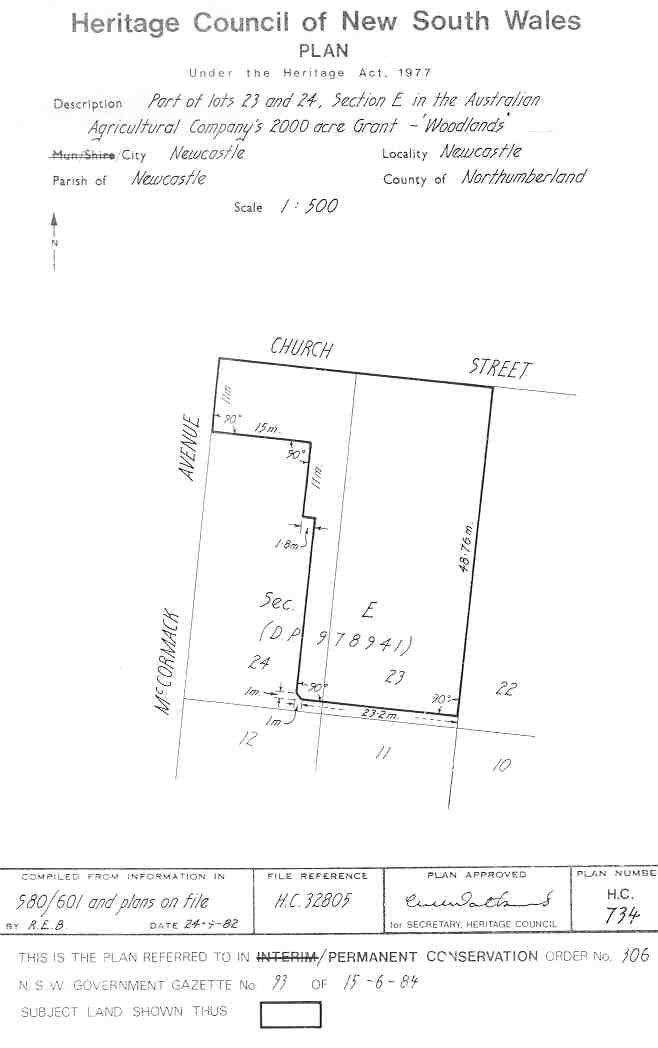
- Heritage boundaries

- Location within New South Wales Location within Australia
- 32.9285°S 151.7754°E
- Location: 51 Church Street, The Hill, Newcastle, City of Newcastle, New South Wales, Australia

Site notes
- Owner: JS LA TJ JS and K Chahl

New South Wales Heritage Register
- Official name: Woodlands
- Type: state heritage (built)
- Designated: 2 April 1999
- Reference no.: 306
- Type: House
- Category: Residential buildings (private)

Woodlands is a heritage-listed house at 51 Church Street, The Hill, Newcastle, City of Newcastle, New South Wales, Australia. It was added to the New South Wales State Heritage Register on 2 April 1999.

== History ==
It was designed by James Henderson and built in 1877 for Joseph Wood, operator of the Castlemaine Brewery. It housed the Cathedral Hill Grammar School, was an Australian Red Cross home for convalescent soldiers, Iluka in 1916–17, during World War I, reverted to use by the school, became the Centaur Hospital during World War II, served as a boarding house for migrants, then was a private hospital run by Dr William Bowmore for 24 years until 1979.

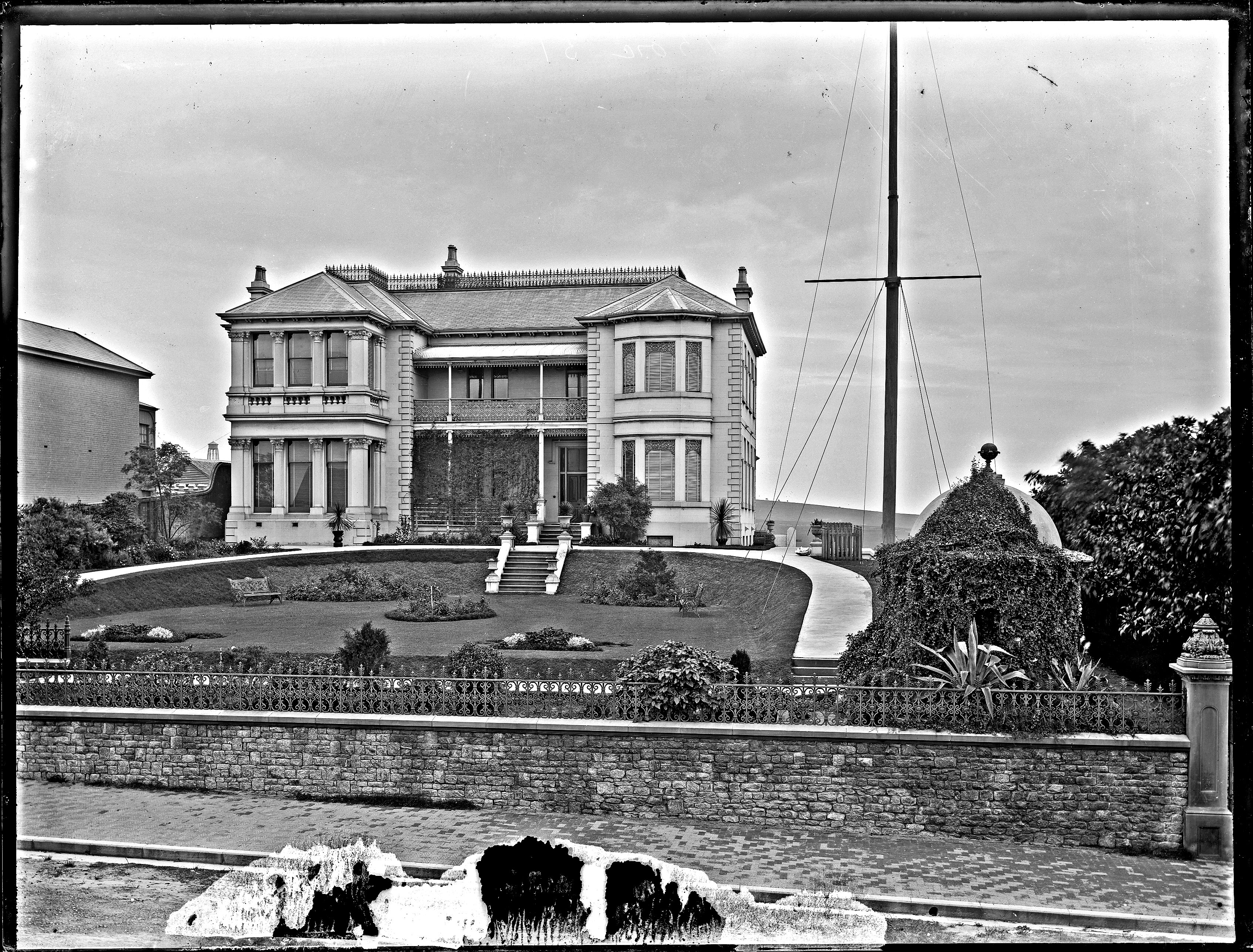
Joseph Wood's residence Woodlands, Newcastle, New South Wales, as it was in March 1890

The mansion subsequently reverted to residential use. It was thoroughly renovated by the Foggs family, who owned the property prior to 2002. It was then owned by property investors the Chahl family. The Chahl family initially planned to convert the house into a function centre in 2004, but this was abandoned after public opposition. It was later planned to convert the house into a boutique guest house, but this had not occurred when the family sold the property for $3.7 million in 2011, one of the largest house prices in Newcastle history.

== Description ==
The mansion is built in the Victorian Italianate style. It includes seven bedrooms, three bathrooms, and two kitchens or one kitchen and an eight bedroom with a kitchenette, a billiard room and six fireplaces. It contains intricate moulded ceilings which were rediscovered during the Foggs' restoration of the building. Much of the property's original landholding has been sold.

== Heritage listing ==
Woodlands was listed on the New South Wales State Heritage Register on 2 April 1999.
