= John Shortland =

Royal Navy officer (1769–1810)

Captain John Shortland
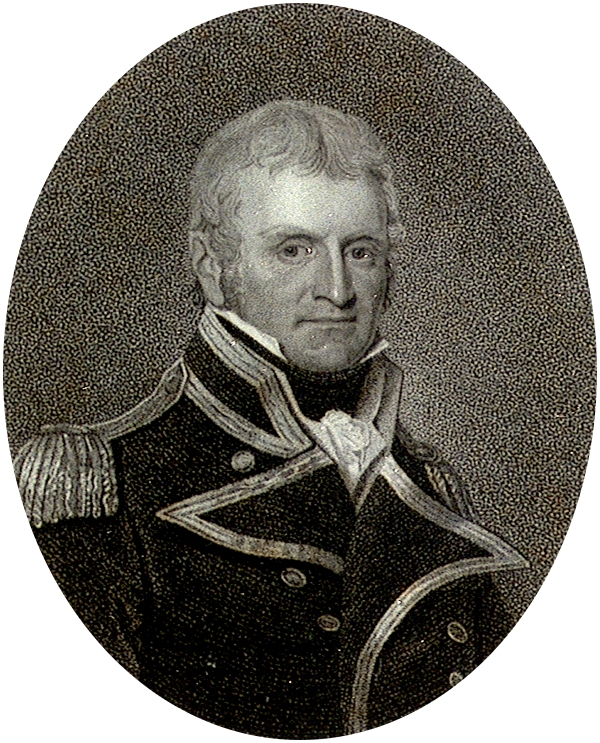
- Born: 5 September 1769
- Died: 21 January 1810 (aged 40); Guadeloupe
- Relatives: John Shortland (father); Willoughby Shortland (nephew); Peter Shortland (nephew); Edward Shortland (nephew)
- Military career
- Allegiance: Kingdom of Great Britain
- Branch: Royal Navy
- Rank: Captain
- Commands: HMS Junon

John Shortland (5 September 1769 – 21 January 1810) was an officer of the Royal Navy, the eldest son of John Shortland. Shortland joined the Royal Navy as a midshipman and went to Quebec in a transport commanded by his father. From 1783 to 1787 he served in the West Indies. In 1787 he was master's mate in HMS Sirius when the First Fleet sailed for Australia. Shortland spent nearly five years in Australia including time on Norfolk Island where Sirius was wrecked in 1790. In 1792 he returned to England.

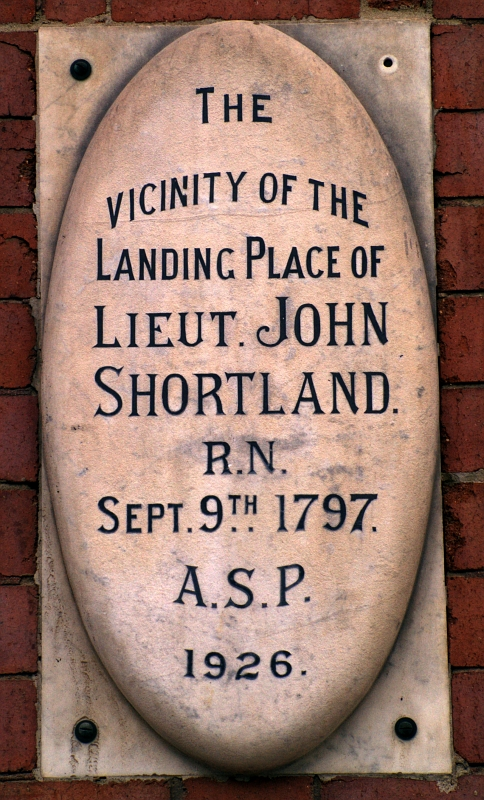
Commemorative plaque of the believed landing spot of Lt. John Shortland at the site of Newcastle, New South Wales, a settlement originally known as Coal River. Located on the Longworth building, 131 Scott Street, Newcastle.

In 1794 he returned to Australia with the new governor, John Hunter as first lieutenant.

On 9 September 1797, while on his way to Port Stephens in pursuit of some runaway convicts, Shortland entered the estuary of the Hunter River on which Newcastle, New South Wales is situated. During his brief stay, Shortland named the river, though for some years it was often referred to as the Coal River, made the first chart of the harbour in the form of an eye-sketch and collected some samples of coal. In a later letter to his father, Shortland predicted that his discovery would prove "a great acquisition to the settlement".

The suburb of Shortland in Newcastle, the federal electoral Division of Shortland, and the former Shortland County Council were named after him.

In 1800 Earl Spencer promoted Shortland to the rank of master and commander. Then his friend, Admiral John Schank, a commissioner of the Transport Board, was able to get Shortland appointed to the troopship Pandour as agent of the troops then going to Egypt.

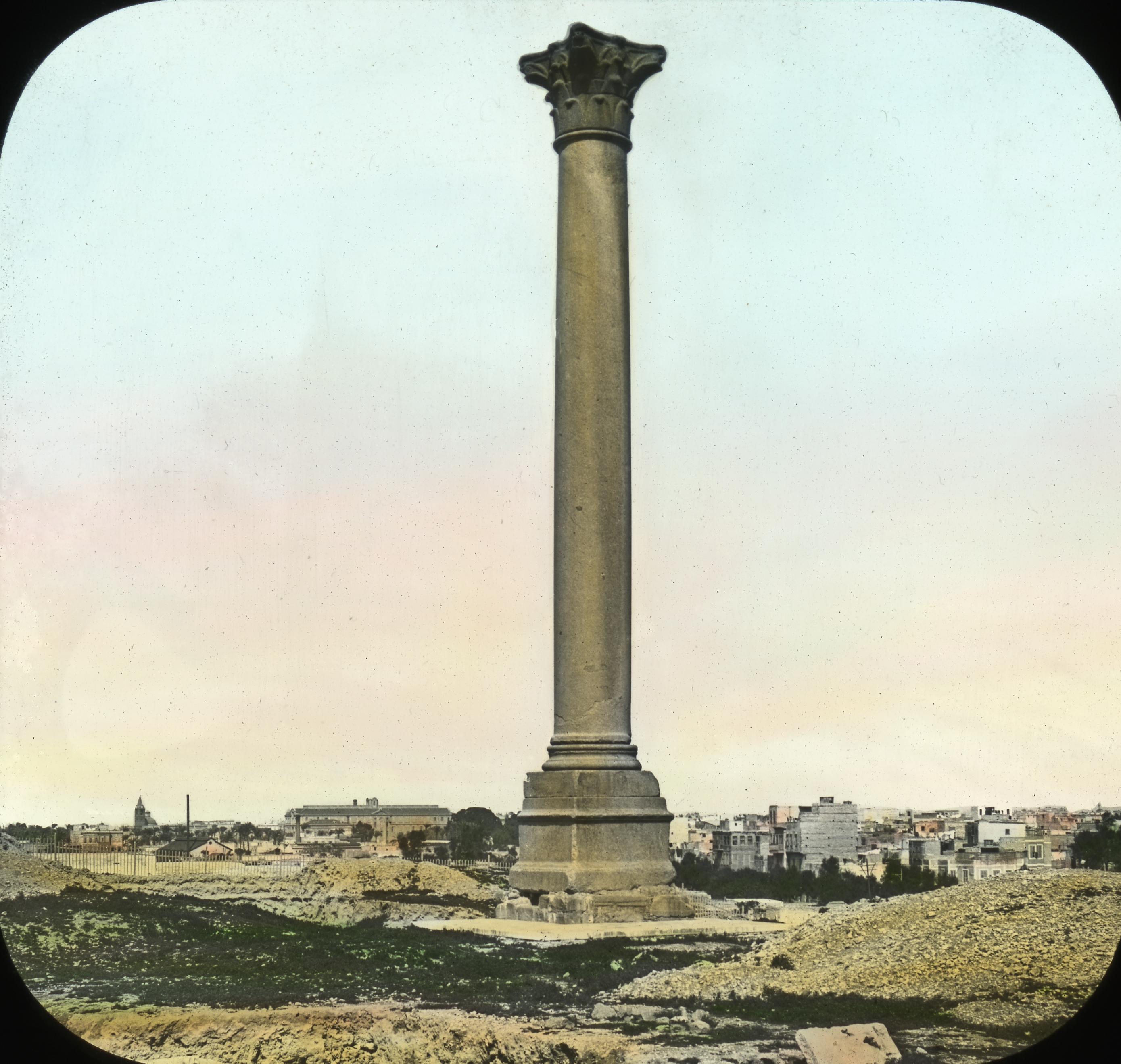
Pompey's Pillar in Alexandria, Egypt, twice climbed by Shortland

While Shortland was in Egypt, he flew a kite over the 26.85 m (present total) Pompey's Pillar. This enabled him to get ropes over it, and then a rope ladder. Then on 2 February 1803 he and John White, Pandour's Master, climbed it. When they got to the top they displayed the Union Jack, drank a toast to King George III, and gave three cheers. Four days later they climbed the pillar again, erected a staff, fixed a weather vane, ate a beef steak, and again toasted the king.

On Shortland's return from Egypt in 1803, he paid off Pandour. A few days later he was appointed to HMS Dolphin, also a troopship. After serving briefly on her, he transferred in 1805 to the 18-gun sloop HMS Trompeuse. He sailed her to the coast of Guinea where he was promoted to post captain in HMS Squirrel, a promotion that the Admiralty confirmed when he returned to England later in 1805.

On 13 December 1809 he was captain of Junon when it engaged and was overwhelmed by two 48-gun and two 20-gun French ships. Shortland was very seriously wounded and his ship so badly damaged that the enemy was compelled to burn her. The French took his mangled body to the hospital at Guadeloupe where he died on 21 January 1810, "firm in his attachment to the Protestant faith". He was buried with full military honours at Basse-Terre, the capital of Guadeloupe.
