= Newcastle Reservoirs =

- Location within New South Wales Location within Australia
- 32°55′49″S 151°46′40″E
- Location: 51 Brown Street, The Hill, New South Wales, Australia

History
- Built: 1880–1918

Site notes
- Architects: Cecil West Darley; NSW Public Works Department
- Owner: Hunter Water

New South Wales Heritage Register
- Official name: Newcastle Reservoirs Site; Brown Street Reservoirs; Newcastle Reservoir No.1; Newcastle Pumping Station; Reservoir No.2 Valve House
- Type: State heritage (built)
- Designated: 27 April 2018
- Reference no.: 2001
- Type: Water Supply Reservoir/ Dam
- Category: Utilities - Water
- Builders: NSW Public Works Department

Newcastle Reservoirs are heritage-listed former and disused reservoirs, now used for public tours, at 51 Brown Street, The Hill, New South Wales, Australia. They were designed by Cecil West Darley and the NSW Public Works Department and built from 1880 to 1918 by the Public Works Department. It is also known as Newcastle Reservoirs Site, Brown Street Reservoirs, Newcastle Reservoir No.1, Newcastle Pumping Station and Reservoir No.2 Valve House. The property is owned by Hunter Water. The reservoirs were added to the New South Wales State Heritage Register on 27 April 2018.

== History ==
=== Pre- and post-contact Aboriginal custodianship ===
The place now called Newcastle was part of the traditional lands of the Awabakal people, who called it Muloobinba. Plentiful fresh water was available to them from waterholes on the plain extending inland, and also from the creeks draining the hills beyond.

=== European ===
The Newcastle convict station at first relied on spring water, although public and private wells were gradually sunk, their numbers increasing with the coming of free settlers. Most inhabitants of inner Newcastle and of the colliery townships that multiplied from the 1840s onwards made do with what surface water could be found, while water-carters made a good living even if their product was poor. Some better quality houses were provided with roof-fed in-ground water tanks. Even these, however, were liable to contamination from household cesspits and runoff. Those who could obtain only "stagnant, impure or putrid-smelling water" and could not afford sand-filled filtration vessels were advised to strain it through a linen cloth into "a large clay flower pot containing successive layers of sand, gravel and charcoal". From the hole at the bottom, stuffed with sponge, might come acceptable water, although bathing and clothes washing remained problematic.

The use of the "English filter", as sand filtration was called after the Metropolis Water Act 1852 (UK) made its use compulsory amongst London water companies, was effective in reducing contamination because of the formation of a "slimy layer", which with the development of germ theory was understood to harbour the microbial communities that trapped organic material, bacteria, viruses and cysts.

During protracted periods of drought, some colliery companies supplied their settlements with water brought by rail from Maitland, while some families made do with locomotive water. The consequences of contaminated water were demonstrated by diarrhoea, dystentery, diphtheria, scarlet fever, typhoid and cholera, particularly among infants. The lack of reticulated water militated against horticulture and encouraged a dusty atmosphere. Some thought that poor water quality increased the local consumption of alcoholic beverages.

In 1866 the Newcastle municipality established a water committee, which in 1875 engaged engineer Francis Bell to recommend a central water source; but no consensus was arrived at. George Alfred Lloyd, Member for Newcastle, then lobbied for a properly capitalised Hunter River District Water Supply that would serve not only Newcastle and the colliery townships but also East Maitland, West Maitland and other centres.

As Newcastle was only one of numerous Australasian towns requiring such as scheme, action was taken by the public sector. In 1876, on the recommendation of G.R. Stephenson (nephew of the famed George Stephenson), William Clark M.Inst.C.E. (1821-1880), an eminent English-born engineer, was identified by the Colonial Office and engaged by the Government of New South Wales to advise on the water supply and drainage of Sydney. During his two years in NSW, Clark also advised on schemes for Newcastle, Bathurst, Goulburn, Orange, Adelaide and Brisbane, and afterwards for both Wellington and Christchurch. Clark was a most versatile engineer whose accomplishments included the designing of a water supply and sewerage scheme for Calcutta; the heating and ventilation of important public buildings; the construction of railways; and the joint invention of the steam roller.

In October 1877 Clark submitted his report on the Hunter River District water supply; but it was some years before the scheme was approved by NSW Parliament under the Country Towns Water and Sewerage Act 1880 (NSW). This empowered the Department of Public Works (PWD) to construct water supply and sewerage systems for regional centres, with construction and supply costs to be borne by municipalities. Clark appears to have based his design on that of his Calcutta water supply scheme, completed in the mid-1860s, concerning which he and Florence Nightingale had conducted a correspondence.

Clark concluded that the best available water source was the Hunter River at Bolwarra, above West Maitland. Although the water was to some extent turbid, Clark considered that it might successfully be treated by progressive filtration through tanks supplied with filtration media of sand and gravel. A suitable, flood-free site for such a complex was available at nearby Walka, whence water would be pumped through a tunnel to a suitably enlarged natural lagoon. After settling, water would be pumped to the highest of a series of tanks, each containing layers of sand and gravel, through which it would progressively pass before arriving, much purified, at the lowest tank. From here it would be pumped via a cast-iron pipeline to a 1,000,000-gallon capacity quadrangular-shaped receiving reservoir at Buttai Hill, some five miles distant, some water being drawn off to supply a distribution reservoir serving East Maitland, West Maitland and Morpeth.

From Buttai the water would be gravitated through a 15" diameter pipeline to a main distribution reservoir next to the old Newcastle National School, situated on The Hill above the city proper. The small number of dwellings above the site would be supplied by a smaller reservoir at The Obelisk, to be gravity fed by night or by steam pump as usage demanded. Further reservoirs would be established as and where required for supplying the suburbs and outlying colliery townships. Clark intended that all reservoirs should be excavated from the natural rock and lined with puddle clay, or cement if necessary, and roofed in timber and corrugated iron to protect against contamination. All were to be circular in shape, except that at Buttai, where good-quality sandstone was available. Clark considered that his scheme would go far towards reducing the local death rate, which he considered was three times what it should have been had potable water been readily available.

The Buttai and Newcastle reservoirs, as executed, bore little resemblance to Clark's concept plans. Both the Buttai and Newcastle reservoirs were wholly designed and approved by engineers of the PWD; for by the time of their commencement, Clark was dead. His original surveys and concept plans, as well as the PWD working drawings of the reservoirs, were lost in the destruction by fire of the Garden Palace, Sydney, where the PWD Harbour and Rivers Branch was largely quartered. Tracings, and presumably copies of Clark's 1877 report, had to be relied on for the development of new drawings. The rock at the reservoir locations selected by Clark having been found unsuitable, both structures had to be executed in masonry with barrel arch roofs, greatly increasing their sophistication and cost. Moreover, Clark's concept of corrugated iron roofs with timber frames, which while cheap would have imposed maintenance and evaporation penalties, was also discounted in favour of a much more substantial structures. These, ironically enough, incorporated Clark's greatest contribution to engineering practice: the tied brick arch, which he had developed in 1858.

In British India, Clark employed the technique not only for reservoirs and roof tanks but for roofing engine houses, boiler houses and even two-storey dwellings, using spans of between 20 and 40 feet. The thrust of the arches was sustained by a system of wrought iron tie rods passing through and secured by hollow pentagonal cast iron beams from which the barrel vaults were sprung from the sloping top flange. These were fully accessible for maintenance. The weight of the wall or parapet prevented buckling or twisting of the beams which, supported by the tie rods, prevented side pressure on the walls which carried only the weight of the roof, making the roof resistant to ground settling. The tie rods could be used singly or in pairs.

The Buttai and Newcastle reservoirs were designed not by Clark but by Cecil West Darley, Resident Engineer, Newcastle, for the Harbour and Rivers Navigation Branch of the PWD. Approved by Edward Orpen Moriarty as Engineer-in-Chief, they were afterwards classified as PWD Type A. The design was considerably more expensive than that of the other eight types evolved by the PWD up until 1891; and it was probably for this reason that it was never again used. (Darley). Irish-born Darley had already garnered considerable experience of hydrology, not least in his connection with the Hydraulic Engine House and hydraulic cranes, visible across the harbour at Bullock Island. The reservoir construction, undertaken by Thomas Bourke of Wallsend, was at first supervised by Darley until he was promoted as Moriarty's Principal Assistant Engineer, his place being taken by Robert Hickson, later Under-Secretary for Public Works and first President of the Sydney Harbour Trust. Darley himself went on to become President of the Metropolitan Board of Water Supply and Sewerage, Engineer-in-Chief for metropolitan sewerage construction, and ultimately Engineer-in-Chief to the PWD. Upon his return to the UK he was appointed Inspecting and Consulting Engineer to the NSW Government.

Whether it was Clark himself who made Moriarty aware of the tied arch technique is unknown; but whatever the case, Moriarty must have approved the Buttai reservoir's lack of the turf roof covering of its Newcastle contemporary. Both reservoirs shared ornate Tuscan-Doric style entrances in Sydney stone, a treatment characteristic of the Victorian's understanding of their engineering achievements as part of a much older tradition. The pentagonal beams, and probably the wrought iron ties, were fabricated by James Stuart Rodgers, proprietor of the Newcastle Foundry in Lower Church Street, with whom Darley had a long professional relationship; the reservoir pipework was supplied by Morison and Bearby of Bullock Island.

By 1885 most elements of the Walka scheme, with the exception of the pumping station itself, were completed, but water was not yet available by which to ameliorate the diseases of that summer. Public anxiety was such that a temporary pumping station was provided. So it was that, at 2p.m. on the last day of the year, as reported under the headline "Water in Newcastle at Last", Robert Hickson and some pressmen watched as the first water poured into the 2.72 megalitres; 718,000 US gallons (598,000 imp gal) capacity Newcastle reservoir. As Glennie Jones observed, "It was almost beyond belief that the moment for which Newcastle had waited for over 10 years had at last arrivedwith the advent of water had come the first essential prerequisite to good health."

The Walka scheme, officially completed in December 1886 and subsequently expanded to serve additional localities, was the first in Australia to feature both at-source water filtration and fully enclosed distribution and storage: there were no open channels whereby contamination might occur. By comparison, Sydney's water was drawn from the Botany Swamps with no filtration or treatment, while Parramatta's supply also lacked these advantages. The Walka scheme's nearest rival was Bendigo's Coliban scheme, which included a water treatment plant but lacked both at-source filtration and fully enclosed distribution.

Although technically successful, the administration and funding of the Walka scheme gave rise to feuding between the many municipalities it encompassed. The Government, therefore, from 1892 vested both administration and infrastructure in a Hunter District Water Supply and Sewerage Board, its Crown-surmounted crest featuring a stylised underground reservoir complete with three of Clark's tied arches; a stylised sewerage outfall; and the proud motto "Pro salute civium" ('For the Public Health'). By way of comparison, not until 1902 was London's water supply regulated by a similar body. In 1938 the Board, by then one of the state's leading engineering and administrative organisations, was renamed as the Hunter District Water Board, a title which in 1988 was further simplified as the Hunter Water Board.

Walka water was palatable enough, but was described as "hard" because of the presence of dissolved minerals. Unsuitable not only for household washing but for some industrial purposes as well, it was long supplemented by private wells, tanks and dams. Over the next two decades local demand for water was to quintuple, as demonstrated by the need c. 1913 to install an electric pump and associated pump house to replace the hydraulic pump that directed water from Reservoir No. 1 to The Obelisk reservoir and later to an elevated tank at what is now Strzelecki Lookout.

Walka Water Works was so hard pressed that breakdowns occurred, during which water restrictions were imposed. The opening of the BHP Iron and Steel Works and other industries, too, greatly increased water consumption. It was by damming the Hunter Valley's Chichester River that the Board sought to meet these and future needs. As this required additional storage, in May 1917 work began on Newcastle Reservoir No. 2 immediately north of Reservoir No. 1, on the site of the National School. It was executed entirely in reinforced concrete, a technology introduced into Australia in the early 1890s by Wilhelm (William) Julius Baltzer, a German immigrant, through his translation of documents from Austria and Germany, where the technique had progressed beyond that devised by Joseph Monier. Retrenched as an engineering draughtsman to the Sewerage Construction Branch of the PWD, Baltzer became Chief Engineer to Gummow, Forest & Company of Alexandria NSW, which further popularised the technique and in 1915 was taken over by the NSW Government as the State Monier Pipe and Reinforced Concrete Works.

Reservoir No. 2 was designed by the PWD in association with the Concrete Works, and erected under the supervision of New Zealand-born Gerald Haskins, the Board's Assistant Engineer and subsequently Chief Engineer to the (Sydney) Metropolitan Water Board, Assistant General Manager of Australian Iron and Steel, and a founding principal of Gutteridge Haskins and Davey (now GHD Pty Ltd). He was assisted by C.E. Warne, a specialised concrete inspector.

The reservoir appears to have been one of the first in NSW to be executed in a quadrangular form, one advantageous for urban footprints restricting the use of the stronger, circular form pioneered at Kiama Reservoir (1899), the first such in NSW and with which C.W. Darley had been closely involved. That the innovative use of concrete was potentially risky had been proved by the expansion-and-contraction induced collapse in 1898 of the concrete roof of the new Centennial Park reservoir, and also by the failure in 1909 of the newly completed Mittagong Reservoir due to incomplete curing of the concrete walls.

Concrete for Reservoir No. 2 was mixed in Tyrrell Street, where an electric hoist was erected for distribution to the levels required. Construction, executed in stages, was completed by 30 June 1918, well before the completion of Chichester Dam in 1926. The brick curtain wall addressing the corner of Brown Street and Tyrrell Street featured a brass plaque, still extant, stating "H.D.W.S.&S.; BOARD ERECTED 1918 A.E. CUTLER M.Inst. C.E. M.I.M.E. PRESIDENT". Incorporating a turf-covered roof supported by piers, the reservoir featured cement rendered internal walls and was equipped with a specially designed inlet valve automatically governing the admission of water from the trunk main. The turfed concrete roof would control contamination, evaporation and expansion and contraction of materials while not being liable to corrosion.

The reservoir was fed at first from Walka and then from a new concrete reservoir at the Big Hill, Waratah, served by the gravitation main conveying water from the as-yet incomplete Chichester Dam. One of the Reservoir No. 1 pumps was replaced c.1923, while the roof-mounted No. 1 valve house appears to have been removed at about this time. In 1924-1925, when Walka Water Works reverted to a stand-by capacity, an alarm bell was installed in Reservoir No. 2 to inform the reservoir caretaker, living in a cottage off Pitt Street, as to when it was empty. From about 1930 the reservoir was served by a newly completed pumping station in Tyrrell Street, while c.1940 the brick curtain wall had to be repointed and repaired. In 1945 the Walka Water Works closed, so severing the historic connection between the Walka and Chichester water supply schemes.

With the introduction in 1982 of "user pays" water charges came substantial reductions in local water usage. This, together with the collapse in 1985 of the roof of The Obelisk reservoir consequent upon an explosion when gas leaking from a corroded main was accidentally ignited by local children lighting Queen's Birthday firecrackers, stimulated the decommissioning of Reservoir No. 1. In 1982, also, Newcastle East Public School relocated from its Bolton Street building to the former Newcastle Public School, the "School on The Hill" located opposite the reservoirs. The school was for some years permitted the use of the turfed roof of Reservoir No. 2 as additional playground space. This recommenced in 2018, after the augmentation of access steps and the replacement of the perimeter safety chain with a steel palisade perimeter fence. In 1992 the Hunter Water Board was reconstituted as the Hunter Water Corporation, trading as Hunter Water. The roof of Reservoir No. 2 was made available for tours, to facilitate which new steel access steps were provided and a safety chain was installed around the roof perimeter. In 2014 Hunter Water undertook works to open the reservoir, sometimes called "The Res" for publicity purposes, for regular tours; their popularity is such they are offered by ballot only.

== Description ==
The Newcastle Reservoirs site consists of two water supply reservoirs located above the CBD. These are the main distribution reservoirs for inner Newcastle water supply.

Newcastle No. 1 Reservoir is a water supply reservoir completed in 1882 but disused since about 1985. Located on The Hill, Newcastle, it is square in plan and is surrounded on three sides by an earthen embankment retained by ventilated lime-mortared stepped and battered brick walls in English bond laid in lime mortar, with prominent stone quoins. The turf-covered roof is formed by barrel-vaulted brick arches springing from the top flanges of hollow section cast iron beams supported by stone-capped square section brick columns.

The arches are tied by paired tie rods, under tension and extending horizontally between the beams. The interior of the reservoir is of face brick, lined in impervious cement render. The reservoir addresses Brown Street, its eastern and northern elevations respectively concealed by dwellings and by the adjacent Newcastle Reservoir No. 2. A double-leafed iron palisade entry gate, decorated with fleurs de lis and flanked by brick piers, addresses Brown Street and provides access to stone steps leading to a brick and stone valve house with a Tuscan Doric-style entry portico with flanking pilasters. Adjacent is a c. 1913 valve house in polychromatic brick, with a concrete roof and decorative cornice.

Directly to the north is the larger and more recent Newcastle Reservoir No. 2, completed in 1918 and still in use. Addressing the corner of Tyrrell Street and Brown Street, its walls are of reinforced concrete, concealed on the northern and western elevations by a ventilated brick curtain wall with a brick dentil course and concrete capping to the base of the inset panels. A bronze plaque commemorates the completion of the reservoir. The turf-covered reinforced concrete roof is supported by reinforced concrete columns. The associated valve house is a Marseille-tiled hipped roofed brick structure with expresses corners and ornamental render details to the openings.

=== Condition ===
As at 4 May 2017, Newcastle Reservoir No. 1

The reservoir stands in good condition, with the exception of some cracking to the embankment retaining wall. The entry portico has fretted in places, while the associated louvred vent has been replaced. A structural assessment has determined that the reservoir is structurally sound. The valve house is now in good condition following repointing and the replacement of corroded entry arch bars. There is some corrosion-related spalling to the reinforced concrete roof.

Newcastle Reservoir No. 2

The reservoir stands in good condition, although the curtain wall addressing Tyrell Street and Brown Street exhibits some minor cracking along the upper edge, while some brickwork requires repointing. Some of the precast concrete plinth elements have been re-rendered. The steel reinforcement of the precast concrete cornice is corroded in some areas, giving rise to spalling. Corrosion is evident in some of the steel posts of the safety chain, resulting in the cracking of some of their concrete bases. The valve house is in good external condition, although some repointing is required and some past graffiti damage is evident. The roof and paintwork are in generally good condition. Internal wall surfaces have been repointed. The roof, handrails and flooring are in good condition.

High conservation value.

=== Modifications and dates ===
- 1880: commencement of Newcastle Reservoir No. 1.
- December 1885: completion of Newcastle Reservoir No. 1.
- c.1913: the on-roof valve house is replaced by a ground level masonry pump house-cum-valve house with a reinforced masonry roof.May 1917: commencement of Newcastle Reservoir No. 2.
- 1918: completion of Newcastle Reservoir No. 2.
- c.1925: installation of an alarm bell to warn the resident caretaker as to when Reservoir No. 2 was full or empty.
- c.1929: construction of Tyrrell Street Pumping Station by which to improve water regulation in Newcastle Reservoir No. 2.
- Mid-1980s: Newcastle Reservoir No. 1 is placed out of use.
- Late 1980s: steel access steps and perimeter safety chains are introduced to facilitate access to the roof of Newcastle Reservoir No. 2.
- 2014: metal chequerboard steps and new lighting are installed, together with projection and sound equipment, are provided to facilitate public tours of Newcastle Reservoir No. 1.
- 2018: to permit the use by the nearby Newcastle East Public School of the turfed roof of Reservoir No. 2, the access steps are augmented and the perimeter safety chain is replaced with a steel palisade fence

== Heritage listing ==
As at 10 May 2017, the Newcastle Reservoirs Site is of state heritage significance for its historical associations with the Walka and Chichester water supply schemes, respectfully the first and second water supply schemes for the Hunter district. The Walka scheme was the first in Australia to incorporate both filtration at source and fully enclosed water distribution and storage, and led to the formation of the Hunter District Water Supply and Sewerage Board, a State entity important in the social and economic development of New South Wales. The Newcastle Reservoirs Site is of state heritage significance in demonstrating the transition from ad-hoc local water sources to centralised reticulated water supply systems characterised by reliability and freedom from contamination. It is of state heritage significance for its association with several persons important in the history of NSW civil and hydraulic engineering. These include William Clark; Edward Orpen Moriarty; Cecil West Darley; and Robert Rowan Purdon Hickson.

Newcastle Reservoir No. 1 is of state heritage significance in demonstrating the importance of aesthetic treatment in nineteenth century NSW water supply infrastructure, and as one of only two NSW water reservoirs known to feature tied brick arches as developed by William Clark. Newcastle Reservoir No. 2 is of state significance as an early application in NSW of reinforced concrete construction to a water reservoir on an urban site with design treatment dictated by the surrounding streetscape. Reservoir No. 1 is of state heritage significance in demonstrating the manner in which nineteenth century NSW water supply infrastructure was influenced not only by UK practice but also by that of British India. Reservoir No. 2 is of state heritage significance in demonstrating the use of contemporary design treatments in the introduction of reinforced concrete construction to the NSW urban environment. Both Newcastle Reservoir No. 1 and Newcastle Reservoir No. 2 are of state significance for the intactness of their fabric, and are of local heritage significance because of the esteem in which they are held by past and present employees of the Hunter District Water Board and its successor entities.

Newcastle Reservoirs was listed on the New South Wales State Heritage Register on 27 April 2018 having satisfied the following criteria.

The place is important in demonstrating the course, or pattern, of cultural or natural history in New South Wales.

The Newcastle Reservoirs Site is of state heritage significance as including two reservoirs integral to the Walka and Chichester water supply schemes, respectfully the first and second water supply schemes for the Hunter district. Reservoir No.1 is associated with the Walka water supply scheme, the first in Australia to incorporate both filtration at source and fully enclosed water distribution and storage, which led to the formation of the Hunter District Water Supply and Sewerage Board (later known as the Hunter District Water Board and Hunter Water Board, forerunners of the present Hunter Water Corporation), a State entity important in the social and economic development of NSW. Reservoir No. 2 is associated with its successor, the Chichester water supply scheme, exploiting a water source not requiring at-source filtration. Both reservoirs are of state heritage significance in demonstrating the transition from ad-hoc local water sources to centralised reticulated water supply systems characterised by reliability and freedom from contamination.

The place has a strong or special association with a person, or group of persons, of importance of cultural or natural history of New South Wales's history.

Newcastle Reservoir No. 1 is of state heritage significance for its association with persons important in the history of NSW civil and hydraulic engineering. First, William Clark, an engineer of world standing, who prepared the concept designs for the Walka water supply scheme and recommended the siting of the reservoir. Clark designed water supply and sewerage schemes for a number of Australasian conurbations, including several in NSW, and also for cities of British India. His system of tied brick arches allowed the staged, rather than simultaneous, construction of barrel vaults supporting reservoir roofs, resulting in efficiencies in cost, labour and materials. Second, Edward Orpen Moriarty, who as Chief Engineer for the Harbour and Rivers Branch of the NSW Department of Public Works (PWD) oversaw the implementation of the scheme. Third, Cecil West Darley, who as Resident Engineer, Newcastle, for the Harbour and Rivers Branch designed the reservoir, and first supervised its erection. Fourth, Robert Rowan Purdon Hickson, Darley's successor as supervisor. Newcastle Reservoir No. 1 is of local heritage significance for its association with James Stuart Rodgers, proprietor of the Newcastle Foundry, which had earlier constructed the first locomotive engine in the colony to be built outside Sydney. Rodgers supplied the iron girders for the tied arches and was later a foundation member of the Hunter District Water Supply and Sewerage Board.

Newcastle Reservoir No. 2 may be of local heritage significance for its association with Gerald Haskins, who as Assistant Engineer for the Hunter District Water, Sewerage and Drainage Board supervised its erection. Haskins was subsequently Chief Engineer for the Metropolitan Water Board; Assistant General Manager of Australian Iron and Steel; and a founding principal of Gutteridge Haskins and Davey (now GHD Pty Ltd).

The place is important in demonstrating aesthetic characteristics and/or a high degree of creative or technical achievement in New South Wales.

Newcastle Reservoir No. 1 is of state heritage significance as a principal element of the Walka water supply scheme, the first in Australia to include both full at-source water filtration and fully enclosed distribution and storage by way of iron pipes and masonry reservoirs. This decreased district mortality rates and facilitating the coalescence of scattered colliery townships into the city of Newcastle, and represented world's best practice for the time, demonstrating technological transfer between the UK, British India and NSW. The reservoir, and the Walka scheme with which it was associated, provided complete protection of the supply from external contamination from source to domicile, a sophistication to this day unavailable to many NSW centres. The reservoir, and particularly its stepped retaining walls and Tuscan-Doric style entry portico, is also of state heritage significance in demonstrating the importance of aesthetic treatment in nineteenth century NSW water supply infrastructure.

Reservoir No. 2 is of state significance as an integral element of the Chichester water supply scheme, upon which depended much of the expansion of NSW heavy industry in the 1920s. It is also of state significance as an early application in NSW of reinforced concrete construction to a water reservoir on an urban site with design treatment dictated by the surrounding streetscape.

The place has a strong or special association with a particular community or cultural group in New South Wales for social, cultural or spiritual reasons.

The Newcastle Reservoirs Site is of local heritage significance because of the esteem in which it is held by past and present employees of the Hunter District Water Board and its successor entities.

The place has potential to yield information that will contribute to an understanding of the cultural or natural history of New South Wales.

Newcastle No. 1 Reservoir is of state heritage significance as a reference site for the Walka water supply scheme, and in yielding substantial information as to the as-yet inadequately researched development of at-source filtering in water supply design. It is also of state significance in demonstrating the manner in which NSW water supply infrastructure was influenced not only by UK practice but also by the experiences of engineer William Clark in British India, and particularly by his development and application of wrought iron ties to brick arches. The reservoir is also of state heritage significance as an integral part of the Hunter River District Water Supply Scheme, a prominent example of nineteenth century progress in providing safe and sustainable water supplies to urban populations as a result of thorough research and planning. In a NSW context, it demonstrates the transfer of state-of-the-art technology in producing the first example in Australia of at-source water filtration in association with totally covered supply and storage.

Newcastle No. 2 Reservoir may be of state heritage significance in demonstrating the manner in which a reticulated district water supply scheme could be integrated into a subsequent scheme taking advantage of new technology in the form of concrete dams and reservoirs. It may also be of state heritage significance in demonstrating the use of contemporary design treatments in the introduction of reinforced concrete construction to the NSW urban environment.

The place possesses uncommon, rare or endangered aspects of the cultural or natural history of New South Wales.

Newcastle No. 1 Reservoir is of state heritage significance as one of only two NSW water reservoirs (the other being at Buttai some distance from Maitland) known to feature tied brick arches as developed and applied by engineer William Clark.

The place is important in demonstrating the principal characteristics of a class of cultural or natural places/environments in New South Wales.

Newcastle No. 1 Reservoir is of state heritage significance as a fine example of an 1880s water reservoir which, because of its incorporation of William Clark's system of tied brick arches, represents a significant variation within its class of comparable NSW reservoirs.
