= Colonial Secretary of New Zealand =

New Zealand political office

The colonial secretary of New Zealand was an office established in 1840 and abolished in 1907. The office was similar to colonial secretaries found elsewhere in the British Empire.

Along with the chief justice, the office was one of the first four created by Governor William Hobson when he arrived in New Zealand in January 1840. The Colonial Secretary's Office handled the creation of New Zealand's public service, and became the modern Department of Internal Affairs in 1907. The colonial secretary became known as the minister of internal affairs from then on.

Constitutionally, the colonial secretary was considered the deputy of the governor, until the granting of responsible government. The colonial secretary was to serve as administrator of the government upon the vacancy of the office of governor-general; Willoughby Shortland acted as administrator following the death of William Hobson in 1841. Henry Sewell, who is considered by some as the first premier (or prime minister), held the position for his short tenure as head of the government in 1856.

== List of colonial secretaries ==
| | Name | Governor served | Premier or Prime Minister served | Took office | Left office | Party |
|---|---|---|---|---|---|---|
| 1 | Willoughby Shortland | William Hobson | | 3 May 1841 | 31 December 1843 | none |
| 2 | Andrew Sinclair | Robert FitzRoy; George Grey; Thomas Gore Browne | | 6 January 1844 | 7 May 1856 | none |
| 3 | Henry Sewell | Thomas Gore Browne | (himself) | 7 May 1856 | 20 May 1856 | none |
| 4 | John Hall | | William Fox | 20 May 1856 | 2 June 1856 | none |
| 5 | William Richmond | | Edward Stafford | 2 June 1856 | 4 November 1856 | none |
| 6 | Edward Stafford | | (himself) | 4 November 1856 | 12 July 1861 | none |
| 7 | Isaac Featherston | | William Fox | 12 July 1861 | 2 August 1861 | none |
| 8 | William Fox | | (himself) | 2 August 1861 | 6 August 1862 | none |
| 9 | Alfred Domett | | (himself) | 6 August 1862 | 30 October 1863 | none |
| | William Fox (2nd time) | | Frederick Whitaker | 30 October 1863 | 24 November 1864 | none |
| 10 | Frederick Weld | | (himself) | 24 November 1864 | 26 June 1865 | none |
| 11 | James Richmond | | Frederick Weld | 26 June 1865 | 16 October 1865 | none |
| | Edward Stafford (2nd time) | | (himself) | 31 October 1865 | 28 June 1869 | none |
| 12 | William Gisborne | | William Fox | 28 June 1869 | 10 September 1872 | none |
| | Henry Sewell (2nd time) | | Edward Stafford | 10 September 1872 | 11 October 1872 | none |
| | John Hall (2nd time) | | George Waterhouse | 11 October 1872 | 3 March 1873 | none |
| | William Fox (3rd time) | | (himself) | 3 March 1873 | 8 April 1873 | none |
| 13 | William Reynolds | | William Fox | 14 April 1873 | 4 July 1873 | none |
| 14 | Daniel Pollen | | William Fox, (himself), Julius Vogel, Harry Atkinson | 4 July 1873 | 13 October 1877 | none |
| 15 | George Grey | | (himself) | 15 October 1877 | 18 October 1877 | none |
| 16 | George Whitmore | | George Grey | 18 October 1877 | 8 October 1879 | none |
| | John Hall (3rd time) | | (himself) | 8 October 1879 | 5 March 1880 | none |
| 17 | Thomas Dick | | John Hall, Whitaker; Atkinson | 5 March 1880 | 16 August 1884 | none |
| 18 | William Montgomery | | Robert Stout | 16 August 1884 | 28 August 1884 | none |
| 19 | Edward Wakefield | | Atkinson | 28 August 1884 | 3 September 1884 | none |
| 20 | Patrick Buckley | | Robert Stout | 4 September 1884 | 8 October 1887 | none |
| 21 | Thomas Hislop | | Atkinson | 8 October 1887 | 10 September 1889 | none |
| 22 | William Russell | | Atkinson | 17 October 1889 | 24 January 1891 | none |
| - | Patrick Buckley (2nd time) | | John Ballance; Richard Seddon | 24 January 1891 | 20 December 1895 | Liberal |
| | | | Richard Seddon | 1895 | 1897 | Liberal |
| | James Carroll (acting) | | Richard Seddon | 1897 | 1899 | Liberal |
| 23 | Joseph Ward | | Richard Seddon, William Hall-Jones | 20 December 1899 | 6 August 1906 | Liberal |
| 24 | Albert Pitt (MLC) | | Joseph Ward | 6 August 1906 | 18 November 1906 | Liberal |
| 25 | John Findlay | | Joseph Ward | 23 November 1906 | 19 November 1907 | Liberal |
