= Horbury Hunt Hall =

Church hall in New South Wales, Australia

Christ Church Anglican Cathedral Hall
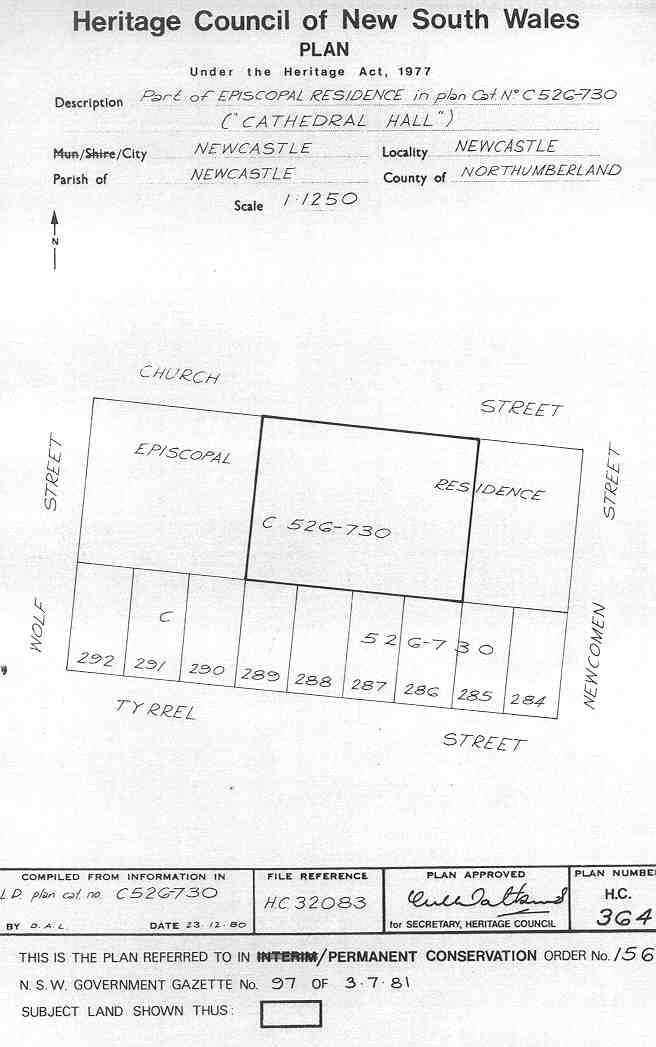
- Heritage boundaries

- Location within New South Wales Location within Australia
- 32.9298°S 151.7802°E
- Location: 52a Church Street, The Hill, Newcastle, City of Newcastle, New South Wales, Australia

History
- Built: 1878–1878

Site notes
- Architect: John Horbury Hunt
- Owner: Anglican Diocese of Newcastle

New South Wales Heritage Register
- Official name: Anglican Cathedral Hall, Christ Church; Horbury Hunt Hall
- Type: state heritage (built)
- Designated: 2 April 1999
- Reference no.: 156
- Type: Church Hall
- Category: Religion

Horbury Hunt Hall is a heritage-listed church hall at 52a Church Street, The Hill, New South Wales, a suburb of Newcastle in Australia. It was designed by John Horbury Hunt and built in 1878. It is also known as Christ Church Anglican Cathedral Hall. The property is owned by the Anglican Diocese of Newcastle. It was added to the New South Wales State Heritage Register on 2 April 1999.

== History ==
In 1882, the church's Parochial Council accepted John Horbury Hunt's ambitious plans for the Christ Church Cathedral. At the same time, they requested Hunt design a pro-Cathedral to be built on the opposite side of Church Street to house the congregation while construction was underway. This building was also to replace the old Christ Church School, which had been purchased by the Dept of Public Instruction in 1882. The then pro-Cathedral was built in 1883–84. As construction of the cathedral was delayed numerous times, the pro-Cathedral housed the congregation for eighteen years until 1902.

It was subsequently used as a Cathedral Hall, and later became part of Newcastle Grammar School. The dean and chapter at Christ Church Cathedral continue to own the hall, while it is managed by the school.

It was restored in 2003–04, although damage to the mortar, internal plaster and stone wall has occurred since.

All of the alterations and additions to Horbury Hunt Hall have impacted or compromised the interpretability of the significant fabric of the building to varying degrees. Generally, the changes have occurred for functional reasons with minimal consideration given to architectural significance. Whilst the design of the building was criticised as "severely plain", and "barn like" in appearance at the time of its construction, these sentiments are more a reflection of the conservative Victorian taste of the public, than a true acknowledgement of the technical innovation of Hunt's design. Joan Kerr describes Horbury Hunt Hall as being a mixture of Hunt's normal style of groups of lancets, single-stepped buttresses and stringcourses with late Victorian details like shingled clerestory walls, wooden mullioned and transomed domestic windows in clerestory and proch, an American stick style interior arcade and a low pitched roof to nave and butting aisles.

== Heritage listing ==
Horbury Hunt Hall is a significant tangible reminder of the 1868 Newcastle Cathedral project. It played an essential part in accommodating the Anglican community in the period between the dismantling of the old Christ Church and the erection of the current Christ Church Cathedral. For 18 years Horbury Hunt Hall was the Cathedral of the Anglican Diocese of Newcastle. However, Horbury Hunt Hall is not only significant for its role in the construction of Cathedral, but also for the history it reveals of its own construction. The contrasting designs of the exterior by Hunt and the interior by Menkens provide pertinent evidence of Hunt's dismissal by Selwyn before the completion of the building. Horbury Hunt Hall is regionally significant for its associations with the Anglican Diocese. It is locally significant for its use by the Cathedral parish and Newcastle Grammar School, and its location in The Hill area of Newcastle. Horbury Hunt Hall remains an invaluable source of history and is integral to the curtilage of Christ Church Cathedral and the saga of the construction of both buildings. Most of all Horbury Hunt Hall is significant for its design and clear associations with the architect John Horbury Hunt. It is therefore considered of high state significance.

Anglican Cathedral Hall, Christ Church was listed on the New South Wales State Heritage Register on 2 April 1999 having satisfied the following criteria.

The place is important in demonstrating the course, or pattern, of cultural or natural history in New South Wales.

Horbury Hunt Hall holds significant importance for its association with the architects John Horbury Hunt and Frederick B Menkens. Hunt was a very well known architect within Australia, and Menkens was well known within Newcastle. Hunt designed many significant buildings and was of enormous stature in the architectural world. Horbury Hunt Hall sits very well in Hunts broader collection of works in the Hunter Valley and the whole of NSW. It therefore has state significance by way of its association and design by John Horbury Hunt.

The Hall is additionally associated with The Rev. Arthur Selwyn, the incumbent of Christ Church from 1867 until his death in 1899. He held considerable influence over the building of the Pro-Cathedral and the current Cathedral. His life, conflicts with Hunt and his death, are an integral part of the historical significance of Horbury Hunt Hall. Selwyn was possibly the most influential player in the drama of the Cathedrals' early history and Horbury Hunt Hall is testament to his influence and therefore hold Local significance for his association with it.

The animosity between Selwyn and Hunt is reflected in the fabric of Horbury Hunt Hall. At the time of construction it was not well received and so disliked that Hunt was dismissed and German immigrant architect Frederick B Menkens was given the task of decorating the interior. Work by Menkens in Newcastle is well known and highly regarded; as such Horbury Hunt Hall has Local significance for its association with Menkens.

The contrast between Hunt's design for the exterior of the building, and Menkens design for the interior, provides a significant attestation to the conflicts between Selwyn as Dean of the Anglican Parish and Hunt the architect. Horbury Hunt Hall therefore holds significant for its substantiated connections with the historically important persons Selwyn, Hunt and Menkens. For its associations with Hunt alone, Horbury Hunt Hall is considered to be of State significance.

The place is important in demonstrating aesthetic characteristics and/or a high degree of creative or technical achievement in New South Wales.

Horbury Hunt Hall has landmark qualities and is important in terms of the curtilage of the Christ Church Cathedral. During its time as the Pro-Cathedral, it held landmark qualities with its views of the whole of Newcastle. However, since the construction of the current Cathedral and the growth of Newcastle, Horbury Hunt Hall's views of the city are considerably diminished and with it, its quality as a landmark.

Horbury Hunt Hall is architecturally important in demonstrating a high degree of creative achievement, being a pioneering example of federation arts and crafts architecture in Australia. Its aesthetic qualities are notable because the art and crafts elements of the design are in fact a precursor to the federation style. Whilst the design of the building was criticised as "severely plain", and "barn like" in appearance at the time of its construction, these sentiments are more a reflection of the conservative Victorian taste of the public, than a true acknowledgement of the technical innovation of Hunt's design. Hunt was in fact 20 years ahead of the architectural style of the time with the design of Horbury Hunt Hall. It was a prelude to the arts and crafts and federation styles, which dominated, in the following century.

Horbury Hunt Hall is associated with the technical innovation of the construction of the cathedral, however, in terms of its architectural characteristics it stands on its own merits as a building of aesthetic significance at a State level.

The place has strong or special association with a particular community or cultural group in New South Wales for social, cultural or spiritual reasons.

Horbury Hunt Hall's use as the Pro-Cathedral is largely forgotten, overshadowed by the planning and building of the current Christ Church Cathedral. Although Horbury Hunt Hall has not enjoyed interest as close to that for the cathedral, the ceremony for the opening was described as a success that would be long remembered in Newcastle. Horbury Hunt Hall served as the parish church until November 1902 when the current Cathedral was occupied.

In the 18 years that Horbury Hunt Hall served as the Pro-Cathedral, it was of significant importance to the Newcastle Anglican Parish. Whilst it was intended to provide temporary accommodation during the construction of the current Cathedral, it was of significant importance to the Newcastle Anglican Parish. Whilst it was intended to provide temporary accommodation during the construction of the current Cathedral, it was nonetheless a place of considerable spiritual importance for some time.

Historically, Horbury Hunt Hall is of spiritual significance to the Newcastle Anglican Parish and Diocese. It functioned as the Cathedral of the Newcastle Dioceses for 18 years as a place of worship. Therefore, it played a significant role in the spiritual, social and cultural life of Newcastle. Furthermore, it has broader regional social and spiritual significance for those it served - the community and the Anglican Church.

The place has potential to yield information that will contribute to an understanding of the cultural or natural history of New South Wales.

Horbury Hunt Hall is integral to the curtilage of the Christ Church Cathedral and the Newcastle Grammar School and the story that the two site and buildings tell. It is an important reference site upon which the tangible history of the Cathedral project and the relationship of Cathedral, Parish, Diocese, and Newcastle Grammar School may be interpreted and understood.
