= Andrew Sinclair (botanist) =

New Zealand colonial officer (1794–1861)

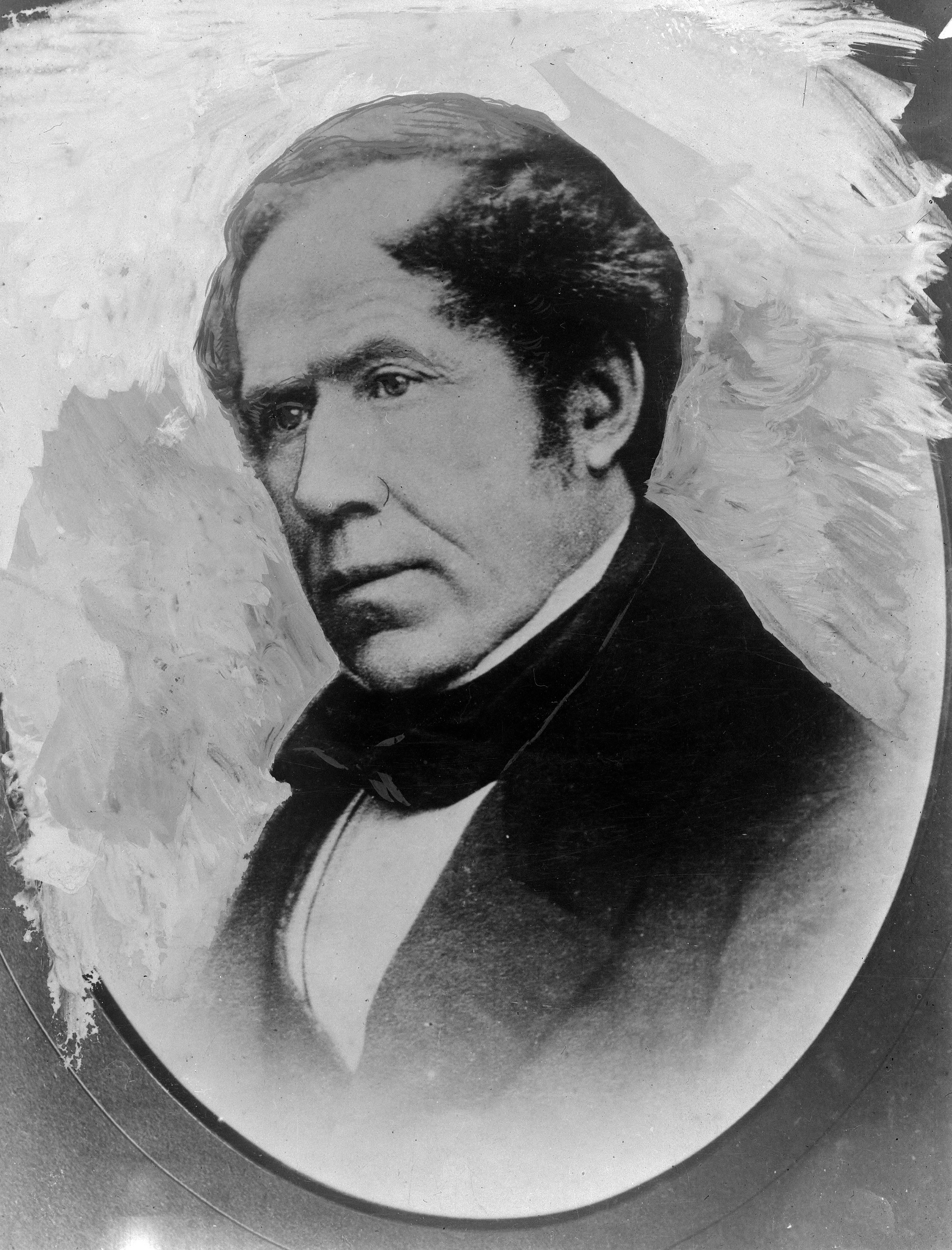
- Portrait of Andrew Sinclair.

2nd Colonial Secretary of New Zealand
- In office 6 January 1844 – 7 May 1856
- Governor: Robert FitzRoy; George Grey; Thomas Gore Browne
- Preceded by: Willoughby Shortland
- Succeeded by: Henry Sewell

New Zealand Legislative Council
- In office 8 January 1844 – 7 May 1856

Personal details
- Born: 13 April 1794 Paisley, Renfrewshire, Scotland
- Died: 26 March 1861 (aged 66) Rangitata River, New Zealand
- Resting place: Mesopotamia Station; 43.64035°S 170.89724°E
- Spouse: never married
- Occupation: Royal navy, botanist, colonial administrator
- Profession: Surgeon

Andrew Sinclair (13 April 1794 – 26 March 1861) was a British surgeon who was notable for his botanical collections. He served as New Zealand's second Colonial Secretary.

== Early life ==
Sinclair was born in Paisley, Renfrewshire, Scotland on 13 April 1794, son of John Sinclair, a weaver, and of Agnes Renfrew. He studied medicine at Glasgow University College from 1814 to 1816 and then trained as a surgeon for a year at Hôpital de la Charité in Paris. He completed his tertiary education at the University of Edinburgh, from where he graduated as Doctor of Medicine (M.D.) in 1818.

== Royal Navy ==
Sinclair entered the navy as an assistant surgeon in 1822 and became a surgeon in 1829. Between 1823 and 1833, he served on HMS Owen Glendower, stationed mainly at the Cape of Good Hope and in the Mediterranean Sea. Much of his spare time was taken up with collecting botanical and zoological samples, many of which he sent to the British Museum.

He took further lectures in medicine and in 1835 joined HMS Sulphur on a surveying expedition to the South American coast, under the command of Captain Frederick William Beechey, and afterwards of Sir Edward Belcher. Sinclair collected plants in California, Mexico, Central America and Brazil, which he continued to send to the British Museum or the Kew Gardens. During this period, he gained a reputation as an important collector. He returned to England in 1839 because of declining health.

== Convict ships ==
When Sinclair regained his health, he started work as a surgeon on convict ships to Australia and had opportunities of collecting at several Australian ports. In 1841, he visited the Bay of Islands on HMS Favourite, arriving on 26 October. He met the party of Captain James Clark Ross who were on their way to their to an Antarctic expedition. He joined missionary William Colenso (himself an avid botanist) and Joseph Dalton Hooker (assistant surgeon for Ross and one of the founders of geographical botany) on several botanical expeditions in the Bay of Islands. He presented a fine collection of shells and insects to the British Museum so that staff were encouraged to start the first systematic catalogue. He returned to Scotland in 1842.

Sinclair arrived in September 1843 in Tasmania on the convict ship Asiatic. On his return journey, he took his discharge in Sydney, as this was the end of his term. There he met Robert FitzRoy, who was on his way to New Zealand as Governor elect. The two men struck a rapport and FitzRoy offered Sinclair a free journey to Auckland, then the capital of New Zealand, where they arrived on 23 December 1843.

== Colonial Secretary of New Zealand ==
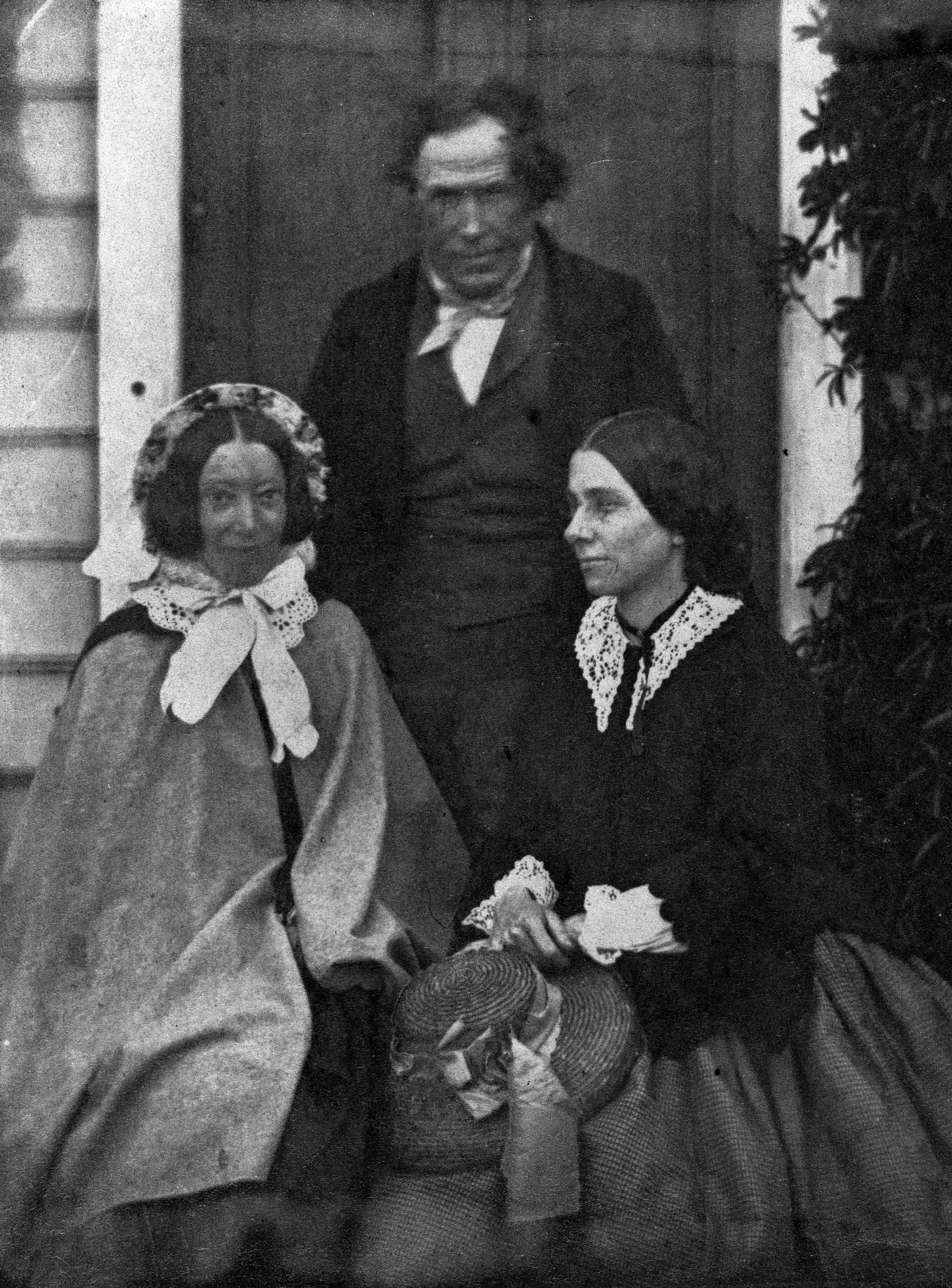
Sinclair with spouses of politicians: Bethia Featherston (left) and Jessie Crawford

The affairs in New Zealand were in a much worse state than FitzRoy had been led to believe. The colony was bankrupt, it had just experienced its first settler-Māori conflict, more conflict was brewing in the Bay of Islands, settlers had lost trust in the Government, and discontent amongst Māori was common. FitzRoy immediately summarily dismissed Willoughby Shortland, who as Colonial Secretary had been acting Governor since William Hobson's death in September 1842.

FitzRoy did not want to appoint anybody connected to any political faction to the position of Colonial Secretary and urged Sinclair to take on that role, who at first declined quoting his inexperience in administrative matters, but eventually agreed to save the Governor from an embarrassing situation. Sinclair was appointed as Colonial Secretary on 6 January 1844, and was called to the Legislative Council on 8 January.

Sinclair served as Colonial Secretary under FitzRoy (until 18 November 1845), George Grey (18 November 1845 – 3 January 1854), acting Governor Robert Wynyard (3 January 1854 – 6 September 1855) and Thomas Gore Browne (from 6 September 1855). His post ended after twelve years when New Zealand obtained responsible government and the first Premier Henry Sewell took on the role of Colonial Secretary himself on 7 May 1856. During his term, he struggled with the tension between settlers and the Governor. He is credited with training staff who formed the core of an effective civil service for New Zealand. Sinclair was regarded as 'honest, upright, scrupulous and laborious'. His political career is described as unremarkable.

== Later life ==
Sinclair retired on a pension to Scotland and also spent time in Europe. He held discussions on scientific issues with Charles Darwin, Thomas Henry Huxley and Richard Owen. He became a fellow of the Linnean Society in 1857. He returned to New Zealand in 1859 to collect in the South Island and on Stewart Island material for a supplement to Hooker's Handbook of the New Zealand flora. He made arrangements with Sir Julius von Haast to explore Mount Cook, but was drowned on 26 March 1861 endeavouring to cross the flooded Rangitata River. Richard Stringer and Sinclair had one horse between them. Their plan was to ride the horse through the river and send the horse back to the second man. Sinclair rode to an island in the middle of the river and tried to send the horse back, but it carried on to the opposite side. Sinclair swam after it, but drowned. He was buried at Samuel Butler's Mesopotamia Station nearby. Sinclair had never married.

His zoological specimens, chiefly sponges and zoophytes, were mostly presented to the British Museum, and his plants to Sir William Hooker, who commemorated him in the tropical American genus of Asteraceae, Sinclairia. His plants were mainly described in Hooker and Arnott's Botany of Beechey's Voyage and Bentham's Botany of the Voyage of the Sulphur. 16 New Zealand plants were named to commemorate Sinclair including Meryta sinclairii, which is a popular street tree in coastal areas.

He contributed Remarks on Physalia pelagica to the Tasmanian Journal of Natural Science, Vol. i (1842), and a letter On the Vegetation of Auckland to Hooker's Journal of Botany, Vol. iii (1851).

Government offices
Preceded by Willoughby Shortland	Colonial Secretary of New Zealand; 1844–1856	Succeeded by Henry Sewell
