= The Hill, New South Wales =

The Hill
- Suburb
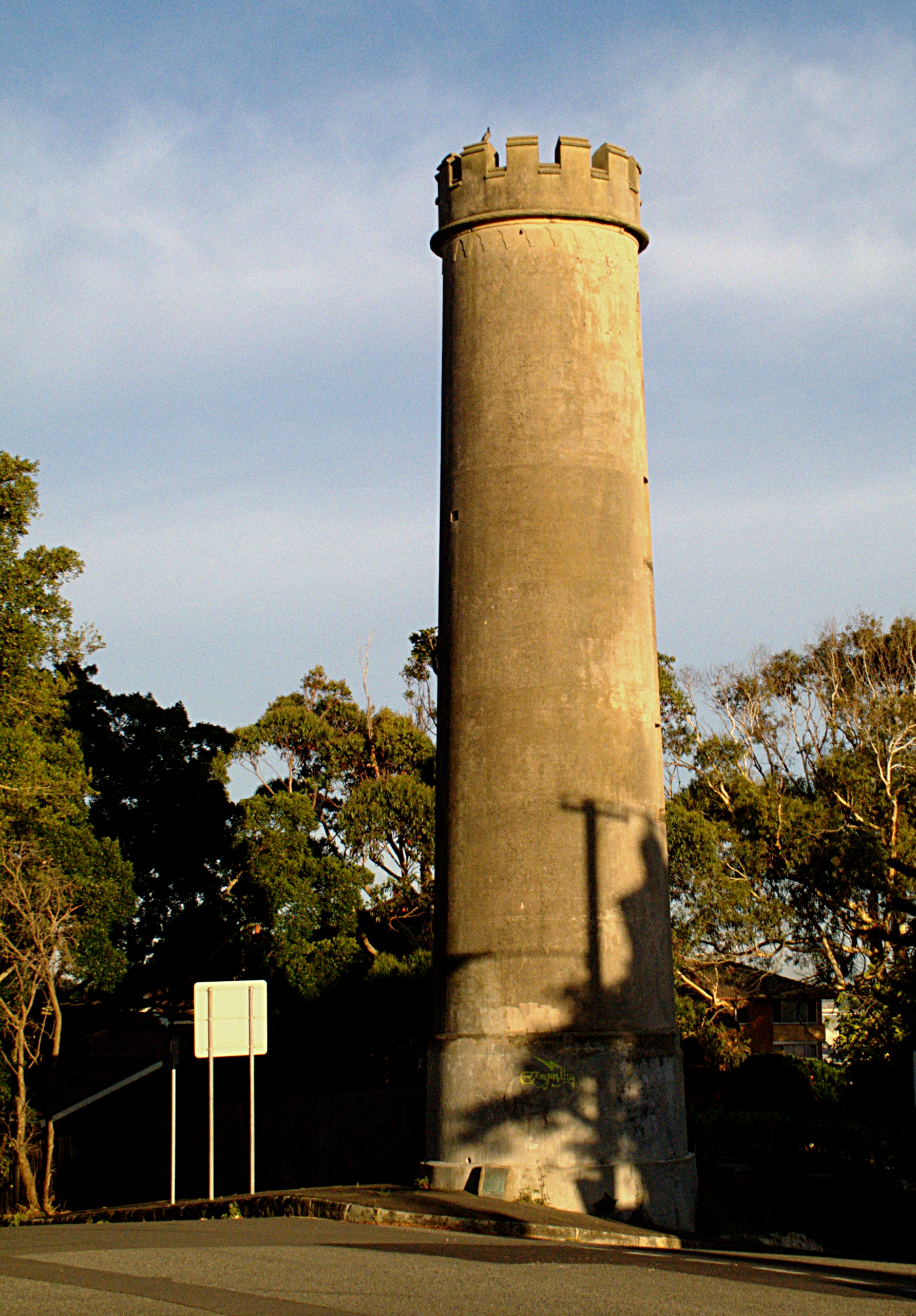
- Beacon Tower, originally 7 m (23 ft) high was extended to 20 m (66 ft) in 1877 after the light had been obscured by the erection of a Wesley Parsonage.

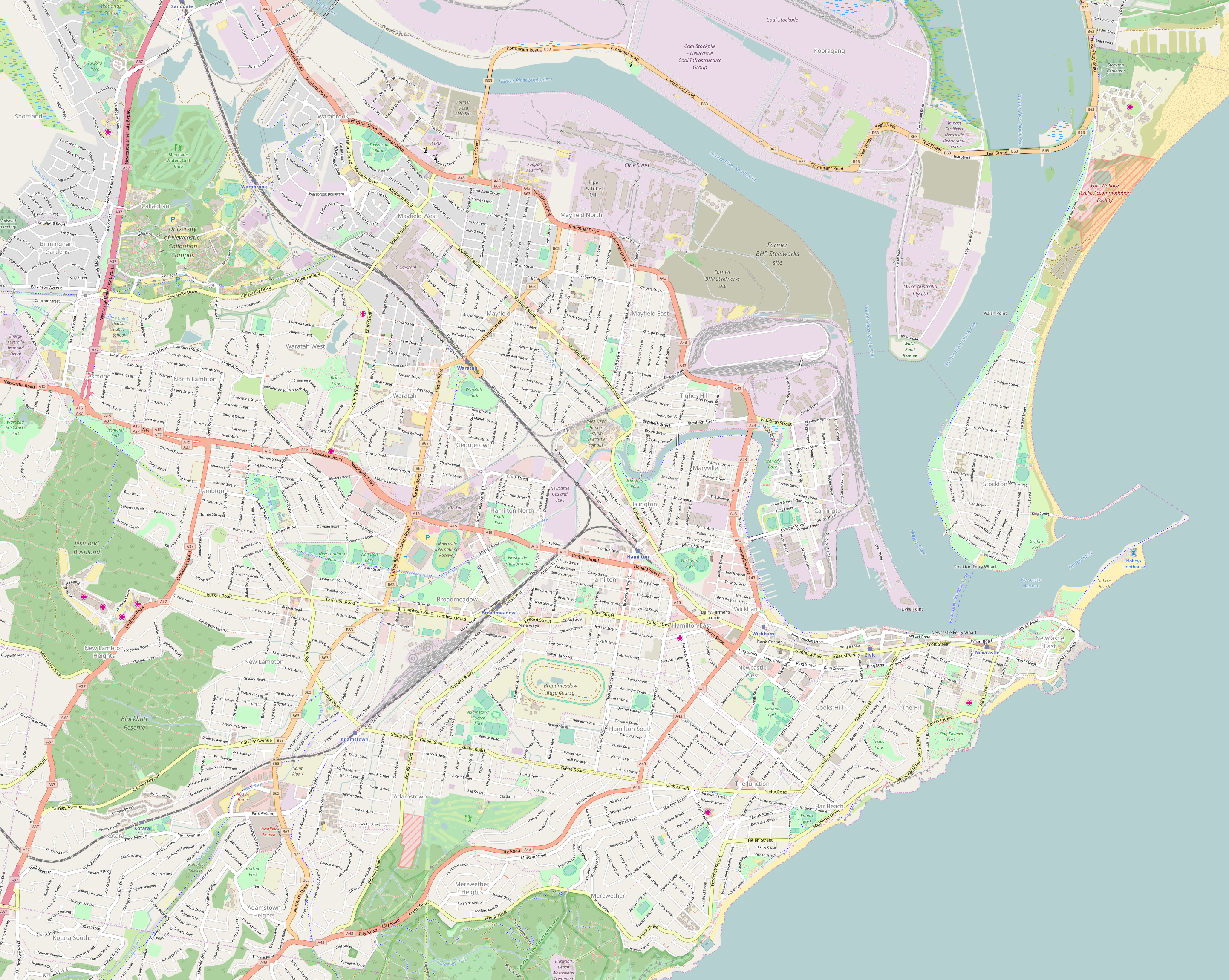
- Interactive map of The Hill
- Coordinates: 32°55′54″S 151°46′34″E
- Country: Australia
- State: New South Wales
- Region: Hunter
- City: Newcastle
- LGA: City of Newcastle
- Location: 159 km (99 mi) NNE of Sydney; 0 km (0 mi) from Newcastle

Government
  - State electorate: Newcastle
  - Federal division: Newcastle

Area^{Note1}
  - Total: 0.63 km^{2} (0.24 sq mi)

Population
  - Total: 2,076 (SAL 2021)
  - Density: 3,335/km^{2} (8,640/sq mi)
- Time zone: UTC+10 (AEST)
  - Summer (DST): UTC+11 (AEDT)
- Postcode: 2300
- County: Northumberland
- Parish: Newcastle
- Mean max temp: 25.5 °C (77.9 °F)
- Mean min temp: 8.4 °C (47.1 °F)
- Annual rainfall: 1,139.5 mm (44.86 in)
Suburbs around The Hill
Newcastle, Cooks Hill	Newcastle	Newcastle
Cooks Hill	The Hill	Newcastle
Bar Beach	Tasman Sea	Newcastle, Tasman Sea

The Hill is an inner city, residential suburb of Newcastle, in the Hunter Region of New South Wales, Australia, located immediately south of Newcastle's central business district. The Hill is filled with historic Victorian terraces and is the site of a historic convict prison block. As of January 2021, the average house price in The Hill was A$1.92m.

== History ==
The Aboriginal people, in this area, the Awabakal, were the previous people of this land. The Hill was first known as Church Hill then Prospect Hill. It was one of the earliest settled areas of Newcastle and the site of the first town plan laid out by Henry Dangar in 1823. The first railway was located there, starting at AA Coy's A Pit just off Church Street

== The Boltons ==
The site was originally used as a mine with two engines creating coal fired stream. A series of four homes in San Francisco style. They are timber houses designed by Frederick B Menkins and built by G.W Brewer in 1904. Each house has 4 bedrooms and bathroom is the last selling for $1,725,00.

== Heritage listings ==
The Hill has a number of heritage-listed sites, including:

- 51 Brown Street: Newcastle Reservoirs
- 51 Church Street: Woodlands
- 52a Church Street: Christ Church Cathedral
- 52a Church Street: Horbury Hunt Hall

== Gallery ==
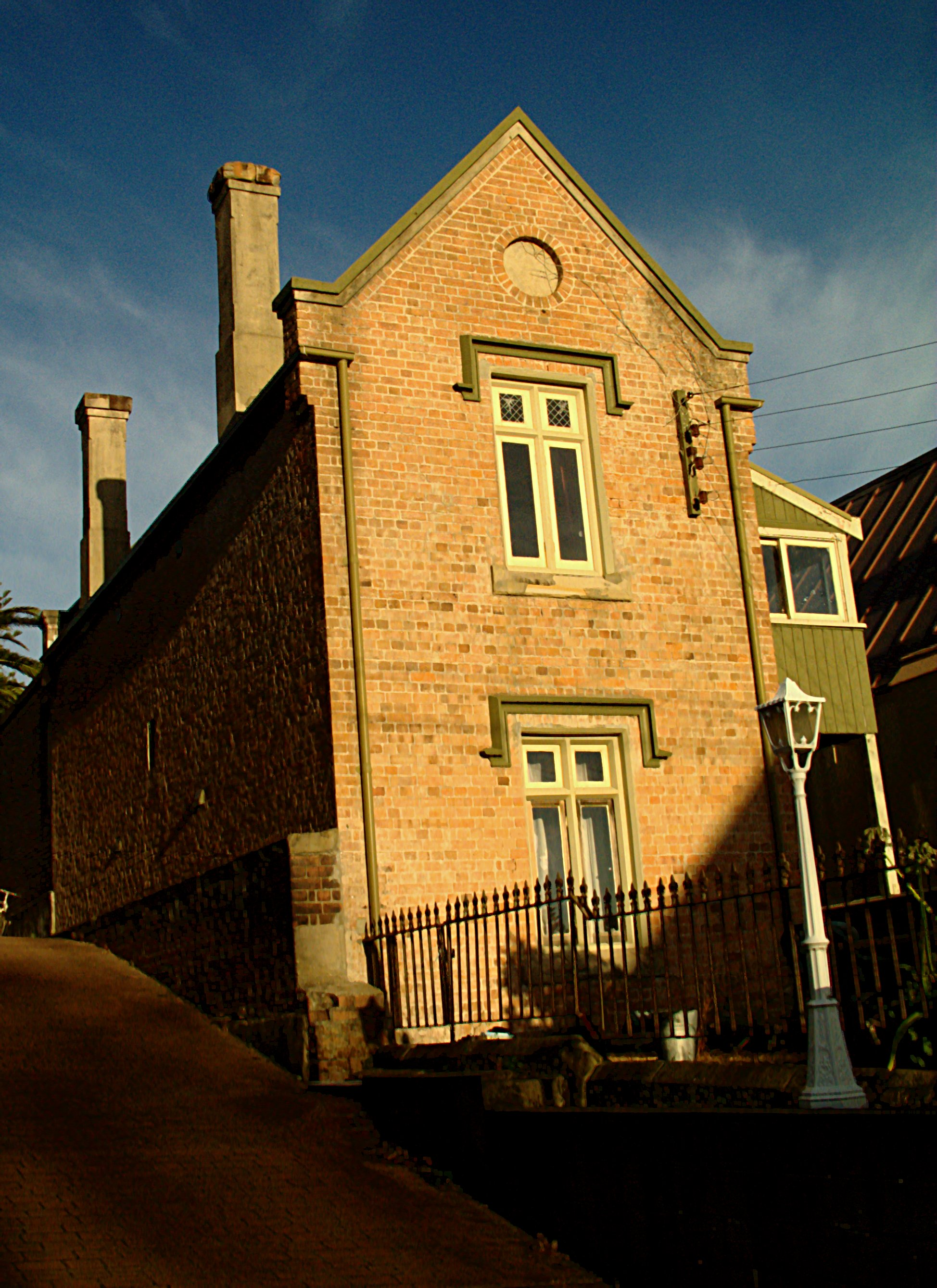
Residence building, which is part of St Mary's Star of the Sea Church

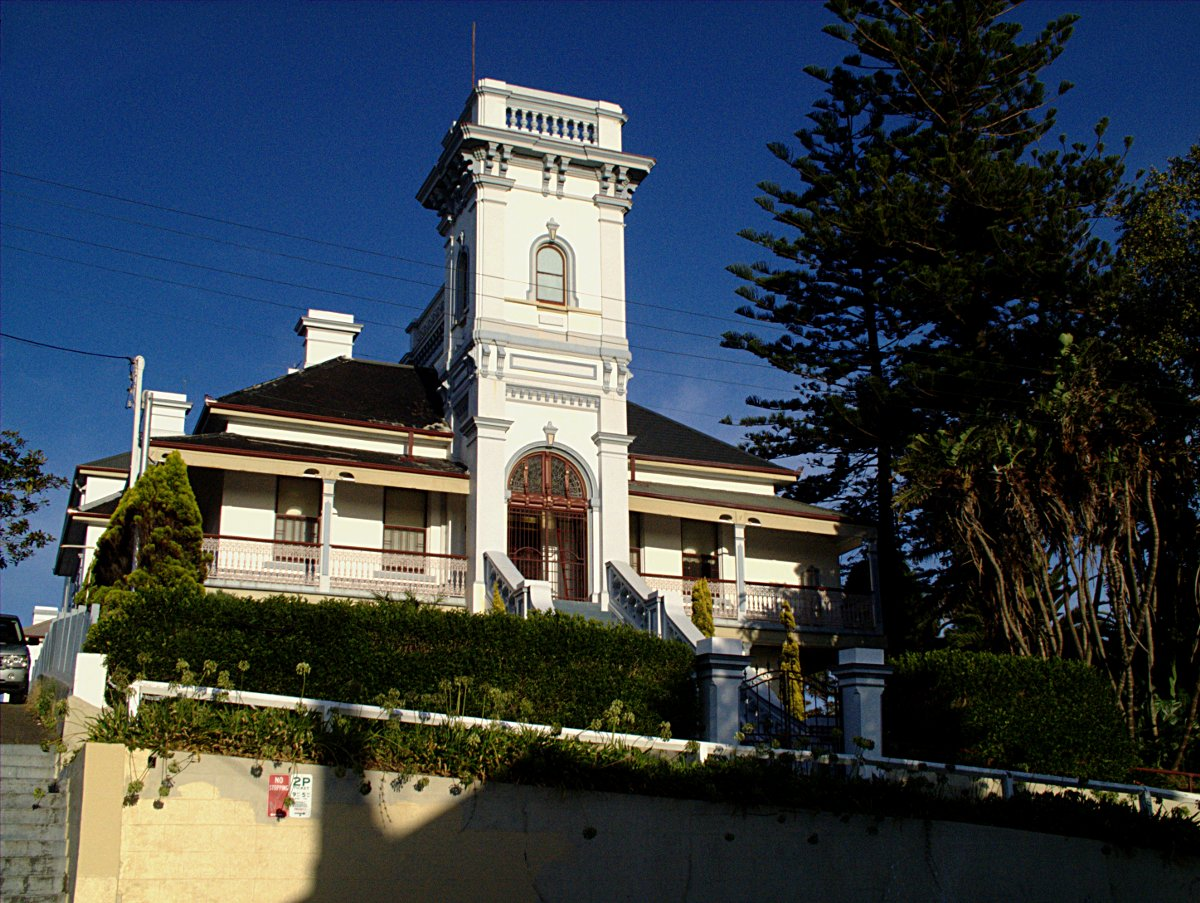
Jesmond House is an Italianate mansion of the 1880s with significant historic associations with Newcastle.

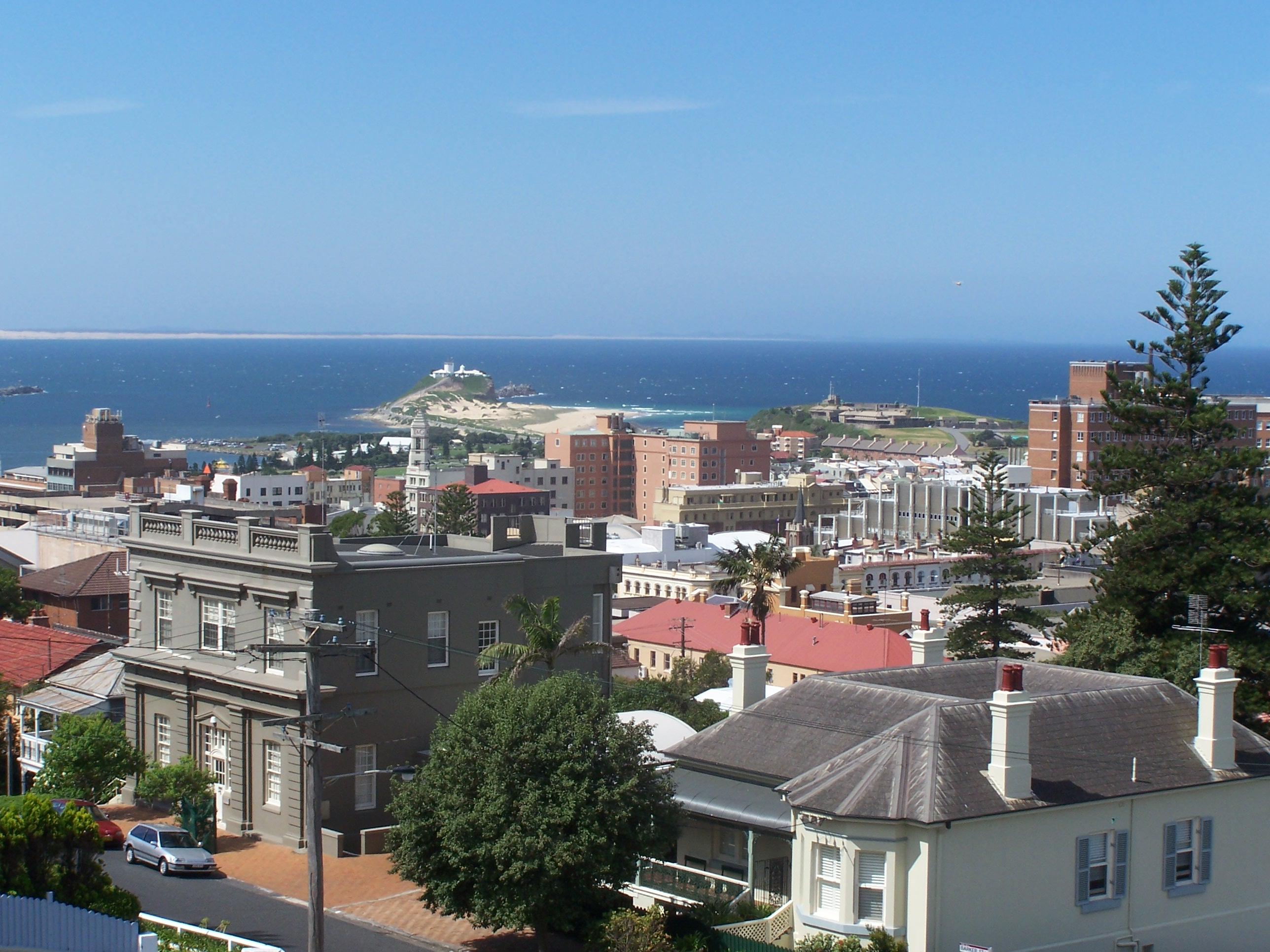
Looking east from Jesmond House with Nobbys Head and Stockton Beach in the background.

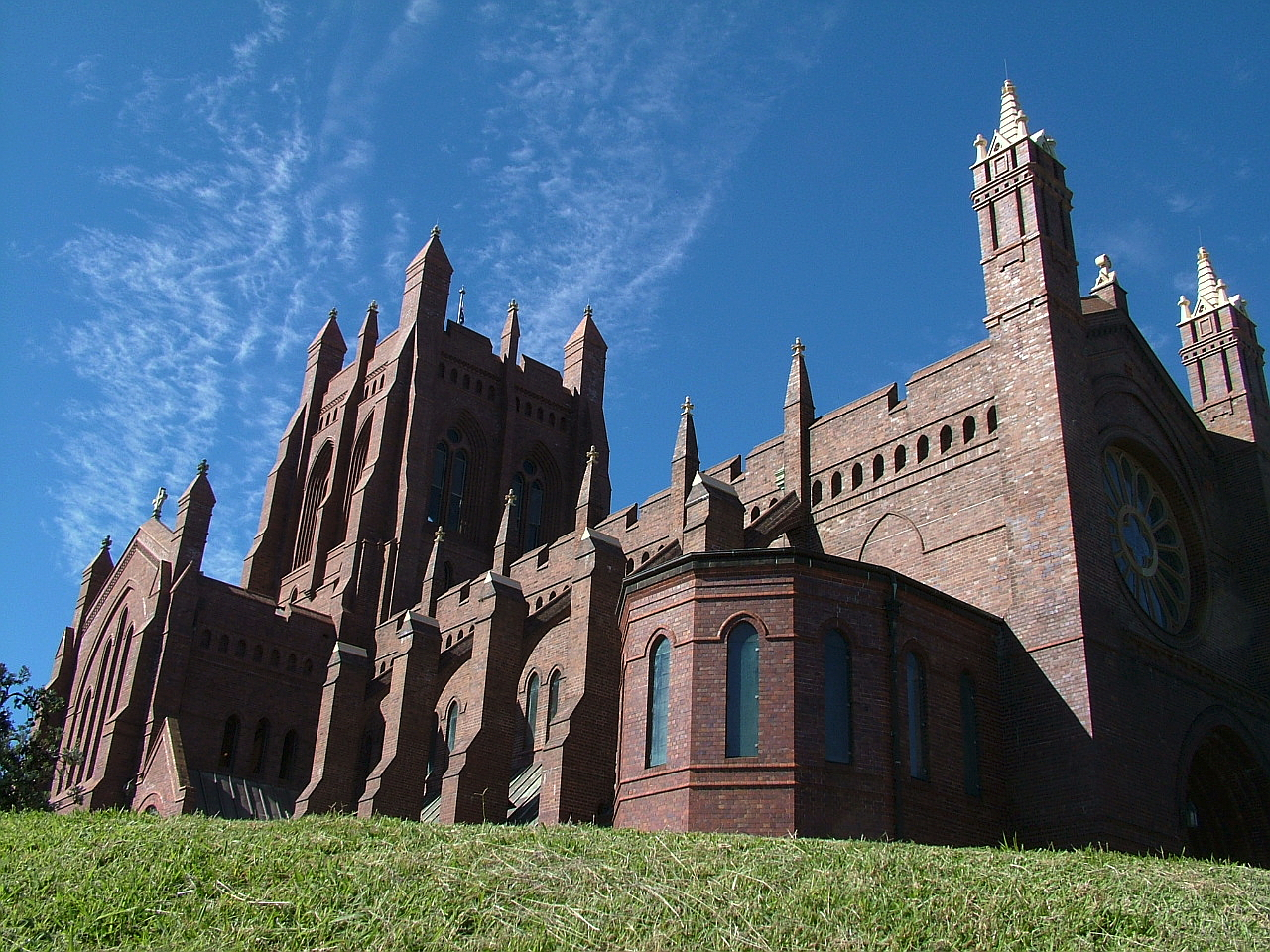
Christ Church Cathedral

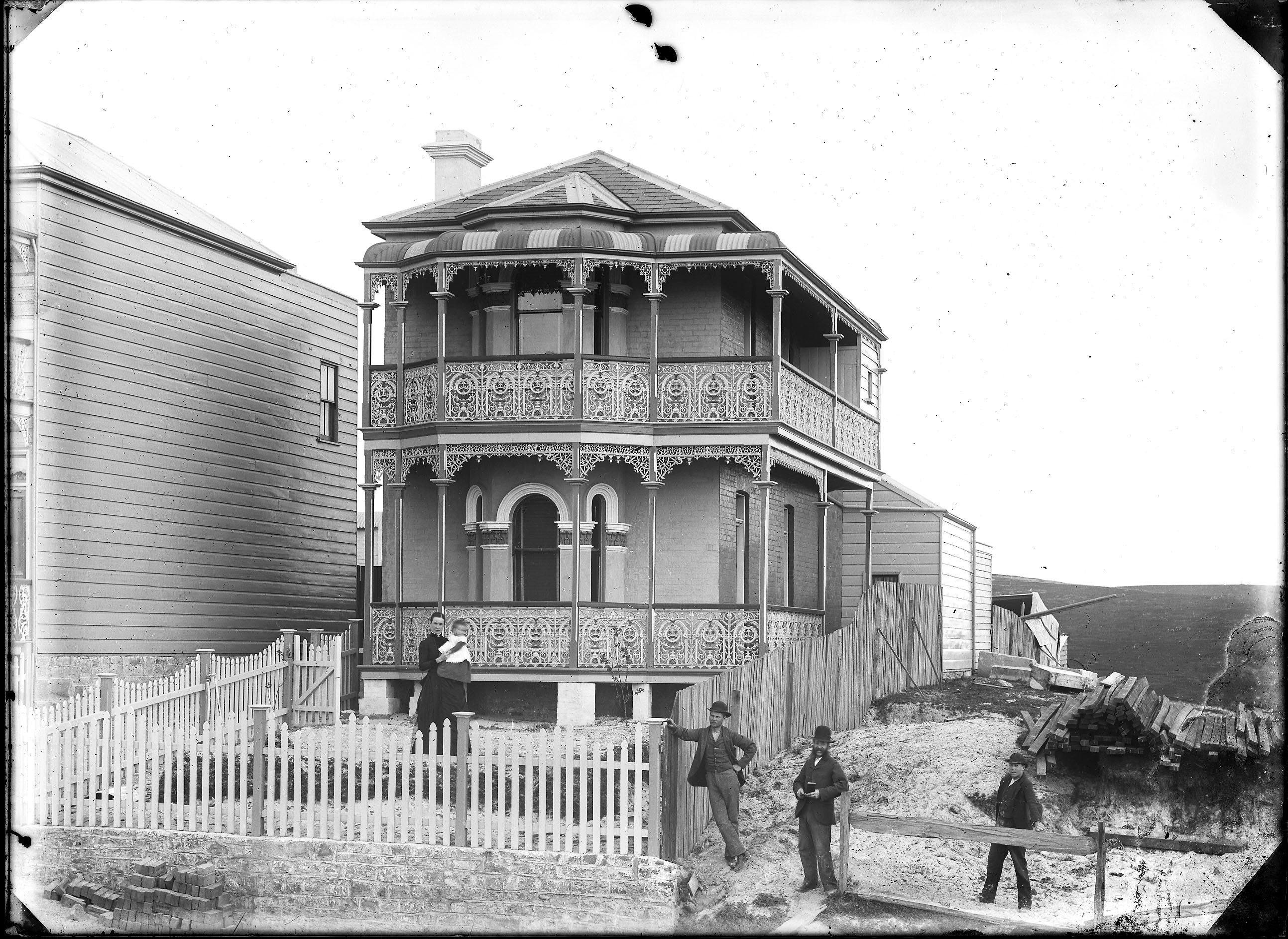
Tyrrell Street house, Newcastle, NSW, 21 September 1887

== Notes ==
1. Area calculation is based on 1:100000 map 9232 NEWCASTLE.
