= Roger Goldsworthy =

Roger Goldsworthy may refer to:

- Roger Goldsworthy (colonial administrator)
- Roger Goldsworthy (politician)
