= Luke Stokes =

Luke Stokes (or Stoakes) was an English colonialist who was twice governor of Nevis before relocating with his family and 1,600 other settlers to the Port Morant area of Jamaica following the English conquest of Jamaica.

Stokes was Governor of Nevis following the death of Thomas Littleton in 1634. However he was replaced in 1635 by Thomas Sparrow. He was governor once again in 1649. He remained in this position until he led the group of settlers to Port Morant in 1656. This constituted the first major settlement by English colonialists.
