= Edward Shortland =

New Zealand medical doctor

Edward Shortland (1812–1893) was a New Zealand medical doctor, administrator, scholar and linguist.

== Life ==
Shortland was born at Courtlands near Lympstone in Devon, England, the third son of Thomas George Shortland and brother of Willoughby and Peter Frederick Shortland. He was educated at Exeter grammar school and at Pembroke College, Cambridge, where he graduated B.A. in 1835 and M.A. in 1839. He then studied medicine, and was admitted an extra-licentiate of the Royal College of Physicians in 1839.

In 1841 Shortland went out, apparently at his brother's suggestion, to New Zealand, where he was appointed private secretary to Governor William Hobson from 1841 to 1842. On 3 August 1842 he was appointed protector of aborigines. On 10 August 1843 he landed at Akaroa on Banks Peninsula, to act as interpreter to Colonel Godfrey's court of inquiry into the land claims of the French company, the Nanto-Bordelaise Co. of Jean Langlois, which was then trying to settle there. After the court closed he took a census of the peninsula.

Shortland reported on various land claims on 18 March 1844. About 1851 he returned for a time to England, and stayed mainly at Plymouth.

In 1860 Shortland served in the Expedition of the Thousand of Garibaldi. He was again in England that year, and became M.R.C.P. He then practised medicine for many years in New Zealand, and subsequently lived for some time at Parnell.

In October 1889 Shortland finally returned to England. He died at Plymouth on 5 July 1893.

== Selected works ==
Shortland's name is mostly identified with the relations between the English and the Maori in the earlier days of settlement. His major works are:

- The Southern Districts of New Zealand, London, 1851.
- Traditions and Superstitions of the New Zealanders, London 1854.
- Maori Religion and Mythology, London, 1882.
- How to learn Maori : a short treatise on the structure and idiom of the language, Auckland, 1883. – a Māori language textbook
