= Peter Shortland =

English naval officer and hydrographic surveyor

Peter Frederick Shortland (c. 1815 – 18 October 1888) was a British naval officer and hydrographic surveyor. He was noted for his work in North America, and for surveys involving deep soundings, particularly in preparation for the laying of submarine cables.

== Biography ==
Peter Shortland was born, probably in England, in about 1815, the son of Thomas George Shortland, a captain in the Royal Navy, and Elizabeth Tonkin. He entered the Navy on 15 January 1827, passed his examinations in December 1834, and was appointed sub-lieutenant. He was first involved in surveying work at Port Phillip as mate of HMS Rattlesnake.

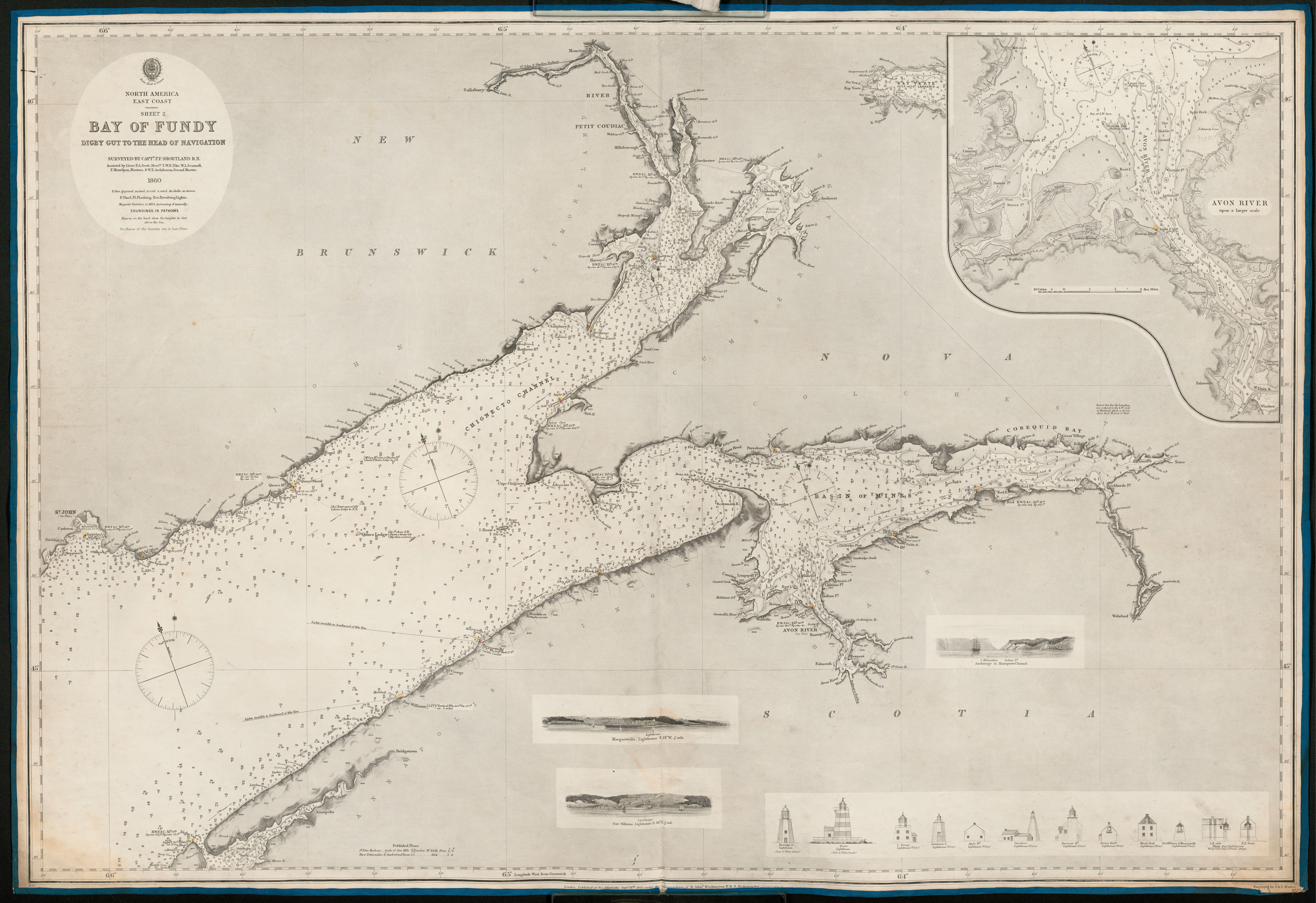
Admiralty Chart of part of the Bay Of Fundy, surveyed by Shortland in 1860.

In 1838 he was given leave of absence to study mathematics at Pembroke College Cambridge, graduating first class in 1842, and becoming a fellow of the college. He was promoted to Lieutenant, and was sent to join the North American Survey under the command of William Fitzwilliam Owen, becoming commander of the Columbia in 1844. The North American surveys were very detailed, and continued until 1865. In the Bay of Fundy the survey included all rivers and creeks as far as they were navigable, and also possible sites for a canal to link the Bay of Fundy with Northumberland Strait. In 1848 he was promoted Commander, and took charge of the North American Survey in 1849. In 1855-6 he was involved in sounding the depths between the SW point of Newfoundland and Cape Breton Island to determine the best route for a submarine telegraph cable. This was the last link in the connection from St. John's, Newfoundland to New Orleans. Overall Shortland's survey work in North America resulted in the publication of 15 major charts

In 1865-7 Shortland was employed in surveys of the coast of Sicily, and the Malta Channel, commanding HMS Hydra. This involved surveying depths of up to 2,000 fathoms (3,700 m). In 1867 he was sent with Hydra to Bombay, to make deep soundings on a line from Bombay to Aden, again in preparation for the laying of a submarine cable, part of the telegraphic link from Britain to India via Suez. The cable was opened for public use on 14 March 1870. While carrying out this survey he made a number of improvements to the methods used for deep soundings, which led to a request from the Hydrographer to publish an account of the voyage.

Shortland retired in November 1870, on reaching the age of 55. He then went on to study law at Cambridge, being called to the bar in January 1873. In 1887 he published A short account of the laws which govern Her Britannic Majesty's navy. He died in Plymouth on 18 October 1888. He was survived by his wife Emily and their children, who published his work on Nautical Surveying in 1890.
