= Wine Selectors =

- Type: Corporation
- Industry: Wine
- Founded: 1975
- Headquarters: Newcastle, New South Wales, Australia
- Key people: Greg Walls, Founder/Managing Director
- Number of employees: 233
- Website: Wine Selectors

Wine Selectors is an Australian company specializing in the wine market. As Australia’s largest independent direct marketer of wine, they support over 500 producers and deliver wine to over 200,000 customers.

As of 2024, almost 5% of Wine Selectors customer reviews are only 1-Star on Google Business reviews. The most common complaints refer to poor quality customer service, as well as difficulties with cancelling orders and membership.

== History ==
Wine Selectors was founded by Greg Walls and started as the Hunter Valley Wine Society in the Hunter Valley in NSW in 1975, providing a central location for up to 25 local producers to sell their wines. These early producers included Tyrrell’s, McWilliam’s, Hungerford Hill, Tulloch Wines and Drayton’s. The initial Membership base was less than 100.

In 1980, Wine Selectors formed a Tasting Panel to select their wines and it remains an integral part of the company today. Made up of winemakers and wine show judges, the Tasting Panel follows Australian wine show judging criteria, tasting all wines blind and using the industry’s official scoring system. They choose wines based on their medal winning status, with the Bronze medal score being the minimum standard.

In 1985, Wine Selectors formed a partnership with Endeavour Industries Limited, a community based not-for-profit organisation that provides employment and support for 35 people living with disabilities. The partnership continues and they now pack all Wine Selectors wines from their Kurri Kurri warehouse. Since 1985, Endeavour Industries has packed and despatched over 5 million cases of wine to Wine Selectors members.

Wine Hunter magazine was launched in the mid-80s as part of Wine Selectors’ Member benefit program. The magazine, which featured Hunter news, wine trends and recipes, was included in all Member deliveries. Another magazine, Le Vigneron, was launched shortly afterwards, which had a national focus. These were then amalgamated into Australian Wine Selector magazine in the early 2000s, which then became the current format Selector magazine in 2007.

Previously based in the Hunter Valley, Wine Selectors moved to its current premises at Honeysuckle, Newcastle, in July 1999. A call centre was set up on these premises in the same year, later moving to its current Hunter St location in 2006.

Wine Selectors currently has over 230 employees and delivers wine to a nationwide membership of over 200,000.

== Wines ==
While Wine Selectors was originally Hunter-centred, since 1984 it has expanded into a national business that sources wines from all over the country. They have a strong focus on regionality, promoting standout region-variety combinations such as Hunter Valley Semillon, Clare Valley Riesling, Margaret River Sauvignon Blanc, Barossa Valley Shiraz, Yarra Valley Pinot Noir and Coonawarra Cabernet.

Wine Selectors has also recently started offering Australia’s newer varieties including Pinot Gris/Grigio, Sangiovese, Tempranillo and Vermentino.
