= Honeysuckle Point Railway Workshops =

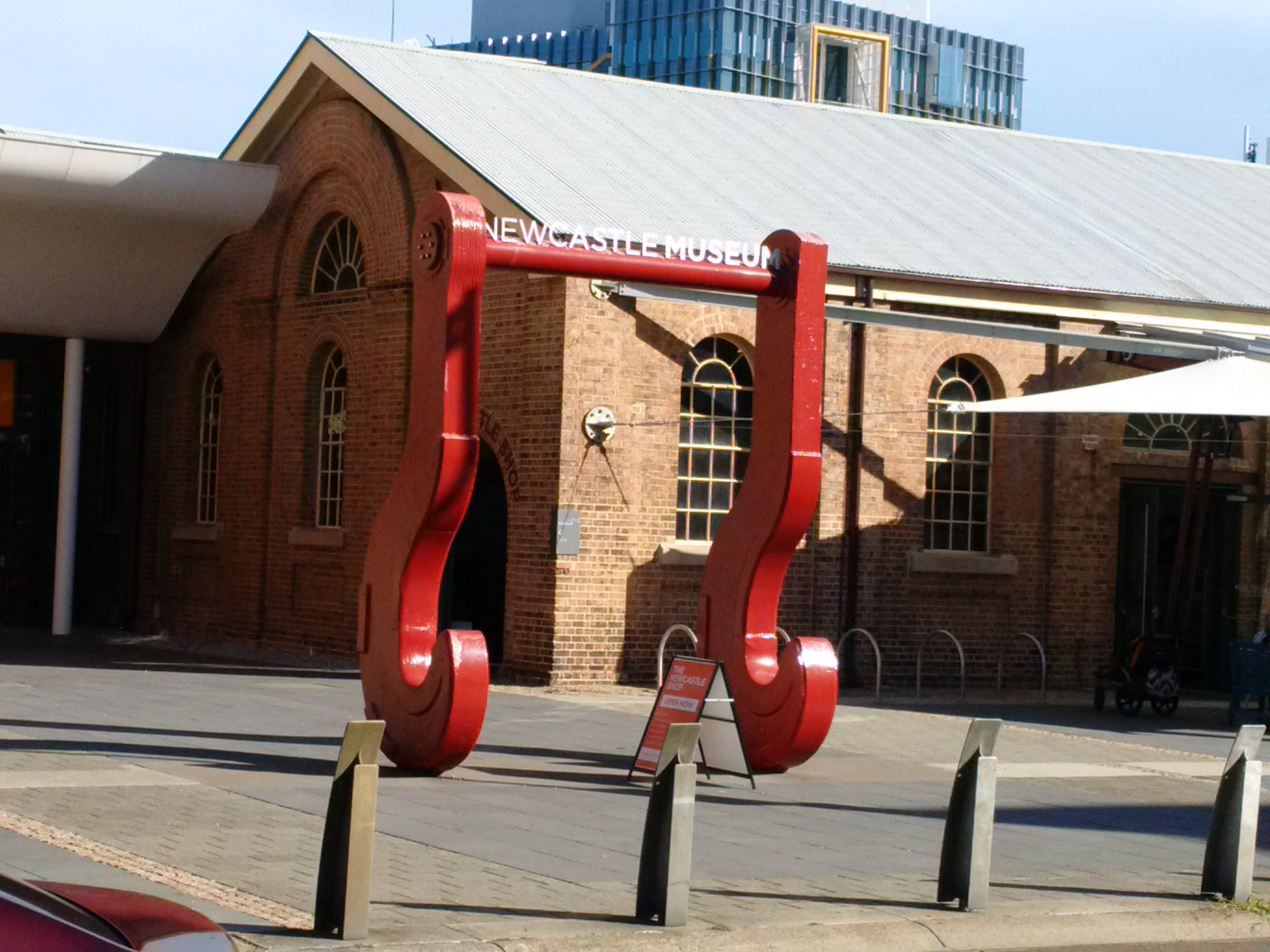
- Newcastle Museum at the railway workshops, 2018

- Location within New South Wales Location within Australia
- 32.9259°S 151.7714°E
- Location: Newcastle, City of Newcastle, New South Wales, Australia

History
- Built: 1874–1886

Site notes
- Architect: John Whitton
- Owner: Hunter Development Corporation; Newcastle City Council

New South Wales Heritage Register
- Official name: Civic Railway Workshops; Honeysuckle; Industrial Archaeological Site; Newcastle Museum
- Type: state heritage (complex / group)
- Designated: 2 April 1999
- Reference no.: 956
- Type: Railway
- Category: Transport – Rail
- Builders: Dart & Parkhill (Boiler House & Machine Shop)

The Honeysuckle Point Railway Workshops are heritage-listed former railway workshops in the Central Business District of Newcastle, New South Wales, Australia. They were designed by John Whitton and built from 1874 to 1886. Also known as Honeysuckle Railway Workshops and Civic Railway Workshops, the site now houses the Newcastle Museum. The workshops were added to the New South Wales State Heritage Register on 2 April 1999.

== Timeline ==
- c. 1840 – purchase of 38 acres at Honeysuckle Point for the erection of a Church School by the trustees on behalf of Anglican Bishop Broughton - 'The Bishop's Settlement'
- 1848 – the Dangar family established Newcastle's first cannery on the harbour foreshore, east of the Bishop's Settlement
- 1848–1851 – Bishop's settlement subdivided into 42 lots and 40 of these were occupied by tenants. Some built houses, others commercial premises, some were operated as shipbuilding yards and industrial plants.
- 1853–1855 – the Hunter River Railway Company was formed to build a line between Newcastle and Maitland. Honeysuckle Point chosen as the eastern terminus for the railway. The company was taken over by the State government due to its poor financial situation.
- 1856–1895 – Railway construction from Honeysuckle to Hexham. Construction of 33 buildings on Bishop's Settlement. Workshops opened at Honeysuckle, including loco shed, carriage repair shed, carriage painting shop, machine shop and blacksmith's shop.
- 1908–1910 – construction of timber wharves along the reclaimed foreshore. The Monier Sea Wall was completed, an innovative structural material which previously had only been used at Walsh Bay in Sydney.
- 1910–1952 – More buildings were constructed, including the Carpenter's Shop, a large foundry, commencement of building at Chullora Railway Workshops (c. 1920), signalling the likely scale-back of operations at the Honeysuckle workshops.
- 1958 – The foundry was closed and its operations transferred to Chullora in Sydney
- 1970s – Most buildings were demolished in the Per Way Workshops, leaving only the Store, the Carpenter's and Plumbers' Shops and the Divisional Engineer's Office.
- 2011 – Newcastle Museum moves into the former workshops
- 2016 – Excavation work in the former rail corridor has uncovered remains of one of the oldest working railway stations in the Hunter, Honeysuckle railway station. Two sandstone walls — between the Hunter New England Health headquarters on Hunter Street and a Honeysuckle Drive office block were found just below the surface. These are believed to be remains of platforms from the second Honeysuckle railway station, built in 1872.

== Surviving buildings ==
Surviving buildings at the site include:

The Divisional Engineer's Office, constructed in 1886, is a two-storied, rendered and painted brick building at the western end of the group. It has a corrugated-iron awning around three sides and a corrugated iron double-gabled roof with rendered brick chimneys along both ridges. Architect was John Whitton.

The Boiler House and Machine Shop is directly to the east and adjoins the Divisional Engineer's Office. Built in 1874–75 (Architect John Whitton, Builder: Dart & Parkhill) it is the oldest building in the group. A single-storey brick building with corrugated gabled roof and arched windows set within a series of recessed bays along both facades. A small brick gabled wing has been added to its northern facade. It now houses the museum's interactive science exhibit, Supernova.

The Blacksmith's Shop and Wheel Shop, constructed between 1880 and 1882, it is located on the southern side of Workshop Way. The building originally served as a locomotive blacksmith's shop (eastern end) and machine and wheel shop (western end). Brick walls and corrugated-iron roofing with a series of arched windows along the length of the northern and southern sides. Five metres in height, its double-gabled roof is connected along the centre line with a box gutter. It is now exhibition space for the museum.

== Archaeology ==
The site has the potential to contain evidence of the original Monier Sea Wall, the remnants of an original stone wall associated with the reclamation for Lee Wharf construction; rail sidings along Lee Wharf and spur connections to the Honeysuckle Railway Workshops/Yards.

In terms of archaeological potential, the Honeysuckle Railway Workshops contain industrial remains including extensive footings of demolished brick buildings, underground pipes for air, water, gas, hydraulic oil and artefacts related to use and occupation of the area as a railway facility for over 100 years.

The site has the potential to contain evidence of the original Monier Sea Wall, an innovative and supposedly rat-proof system first used at Walsh Bay, Sydney and then used here. The remnants of an original stone wall associated with reclamation for the Lee Wharf construction; rail sidings along Lee Wharf and spur connections to the Honeysuckle Railway Workshops/Yards.

== Heritage listing ==
Civic Railway Workshops is one of the outstanding industrial workshop sites in the State and an excellent example of a Victorian workshop group that display continuity, excellence in design and execution and add to the townscape of Newcastle as well as play an important role in the history of the railway in the area. The whole group is of highest significance in the State. Construction of workshops in Newcastle was brought about for two reasons: separation of the Great Northern lines from the main system from 1857 to 1889; and in recognition of the exclusive facilities and rolling stock required to handle coal traffic.

The Lee Wharf site has the potential to contain historical archaeological remains, including remains of State significance. Some may lie within the boundary of the State Heritage Register Listing. Others may lay outside that boundary.

Civic Railway Workshops was listed on the New South Wales State Heritage Register on 2 April 1999 having satisfied the following criteria.

The place is important in demonstrating aesthetic characteristics and/or a high degree of creative or technical achievement in New South Wales.

The group of workshops is the only remaining example that demonstrates the design principles and technology applied to small railway workshop buildings in the 1870s and 1880s in Southeastern Australia.

== Engineering heritage award ==
The workshops received a Historic Engineering Marker from Engineers Australia as part of its Engineering Heritage Recognition Program.
