= Newcastle Museum =

Museum in New South Wales, Australia

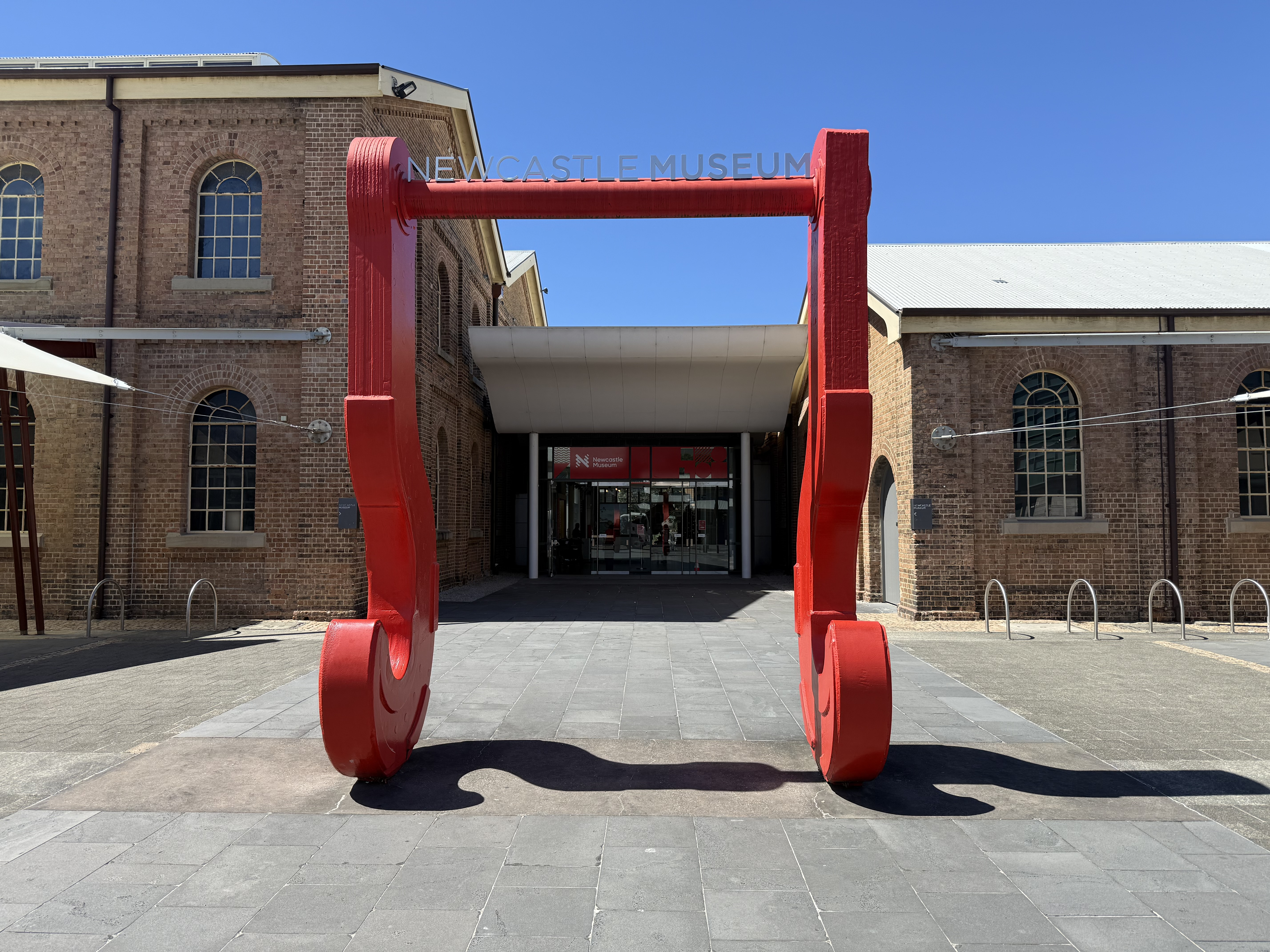
- Newcastle Museum, at the former railway workshops, 2025

- Location within New South Wales
- Established: 1988
- Location: 6 Workshop Way; Newcastle, New South Wales
- Coordinates: 32°55′34.5″S 151°46′21.07″E
- Type: Regional museum
- Collections: Industrial heritage, local history, science education, BHP steelworks, Newcastle earthquake artefacts
- Collection size: 12,500+
- Visitors: 2,015,000 (August 2024)
- Owner: Newcastle City Council
- Public transit access: Civic
- Parking: Paid parking available nearby (Honeysuckle precinct)
- Website: www.newcastlemuseum.com.au

Newcastle Museum is in Newcastle, New South Wales, Australia. The museum is connected with Newcastle Libraries. It showcases exhibitions across science, industry, local history, and regional culture, with interactive and heritage-focused displays.

Since opening in its current location, Newcastle Museum has received many awards for its design, environmental sustainability, exhibitions and tourism.

== Exhibitions ==
=== Permanent exhibitions ===
- Supernova - A hands-on science centre, allowing visitors to explore scientific concepts through a range of interactive exhibits.
- Kuueeyung - Explores how Worrimai and Awarbukarl peoples made traditional canoes out of the Punnah (stringybark) tree.
- Fire and Earth - Coal mining and BHP steel production. This includes the BHP Experience, a five-minute show run hourly, explaining the steel-making process using some of the objects on display and some dramatic effects.
- A Newcastle Story - Explores the city of Newcastle through time, from early Aboriginal life through to present day and into the future. Part of this exhibition shows the history and experiences of German-speakers in the Hunter region, telling the stories of German refugees during the Second World War.
- Link Gallery - Houses some large artefacts including a 1980 pipe organ and an 1870 J&A Brown Locomotive No4.

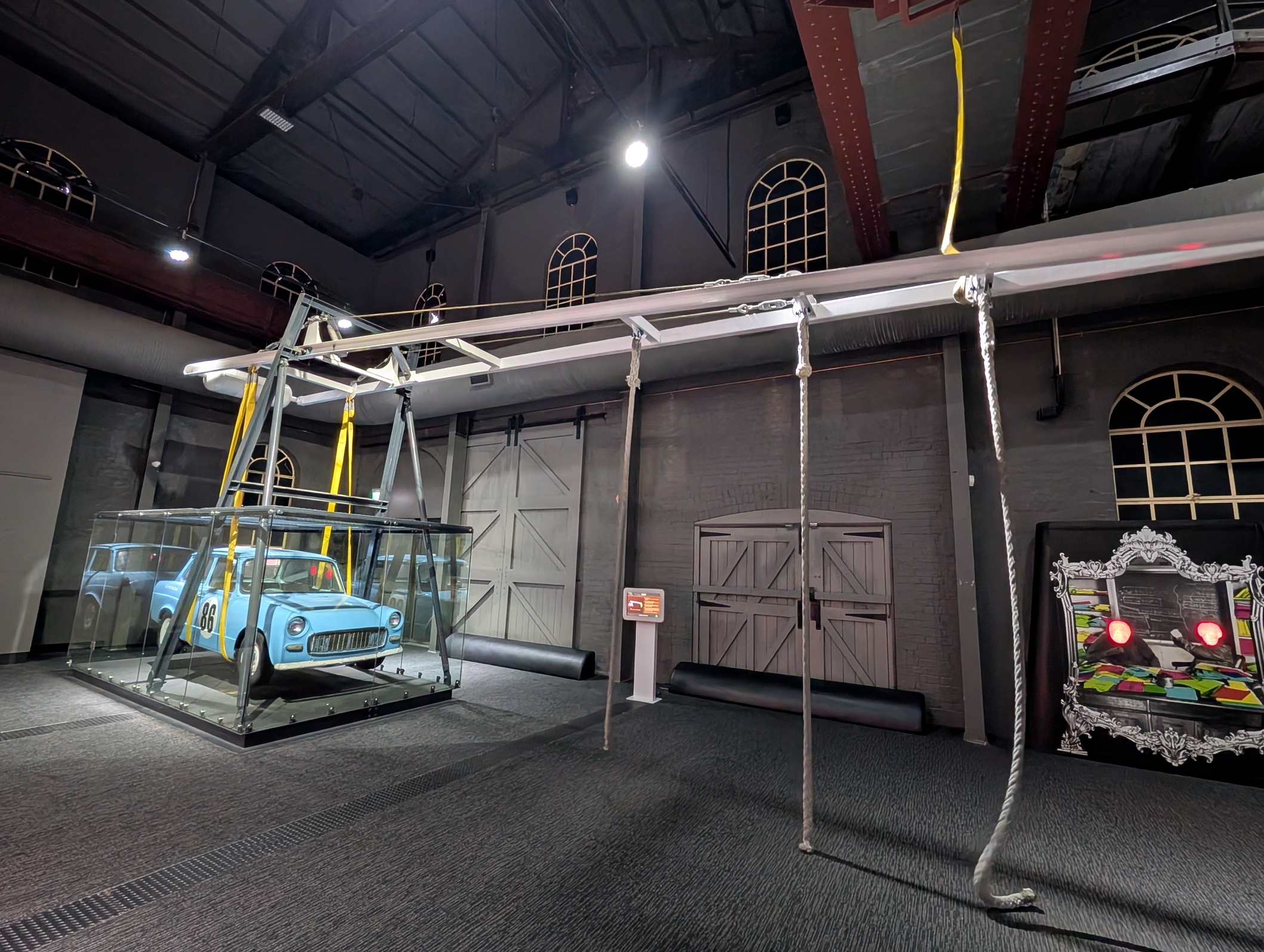
Lift-a-car interactive exhibit in Supernova exhibition

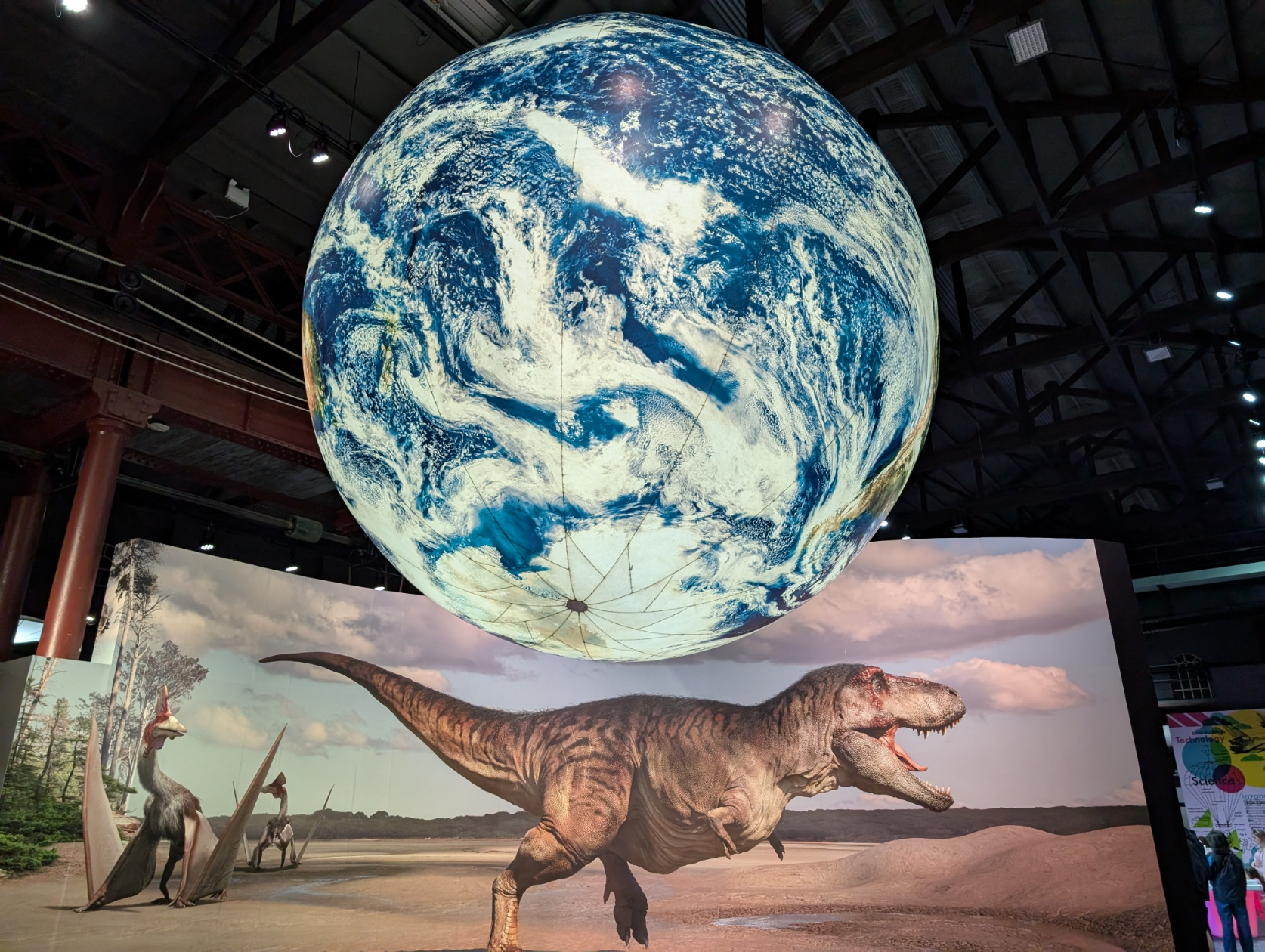
Earth Ball exhibit in Supernova exhibition

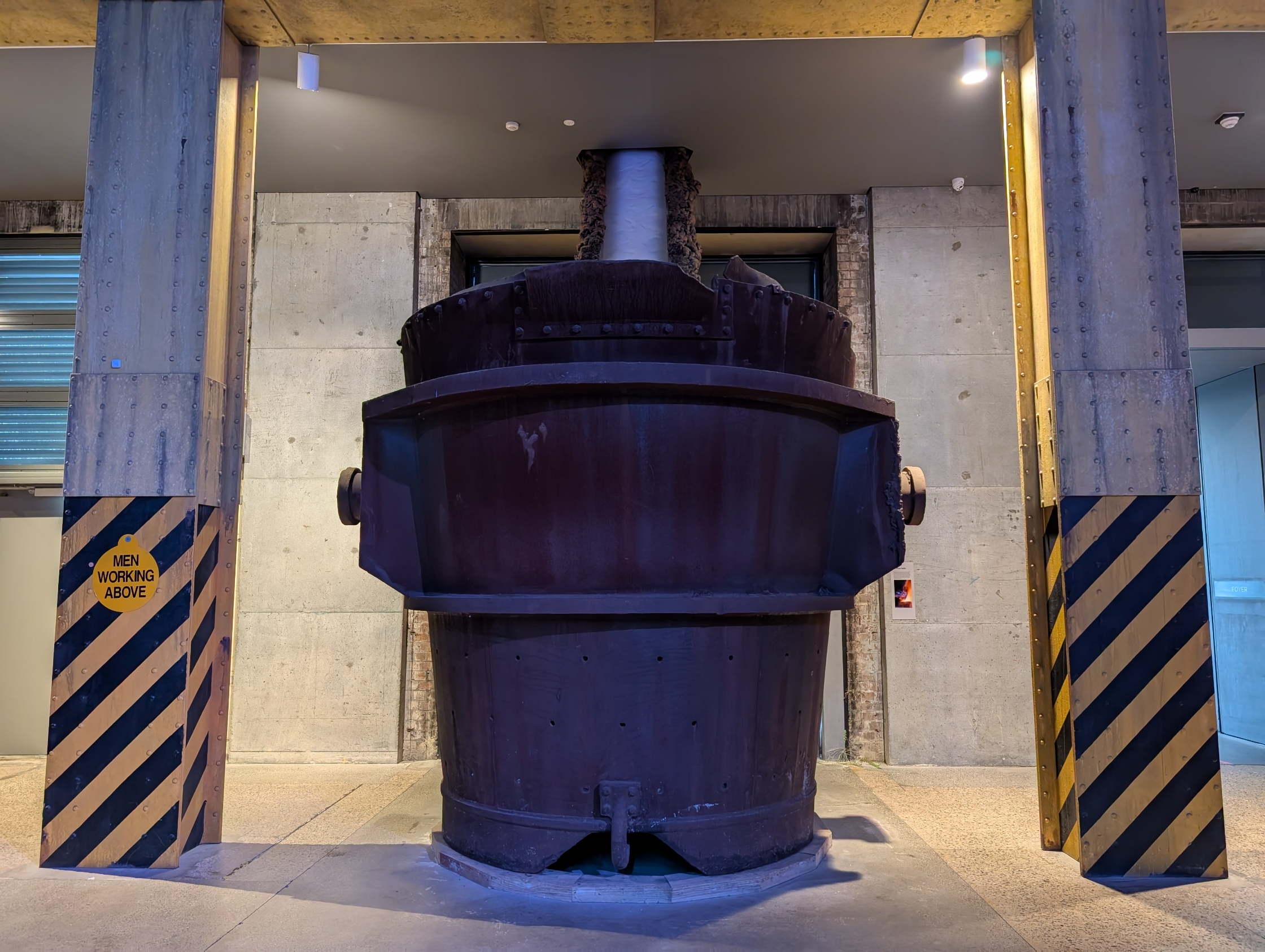
60 tonne ladle; part of the BHP steelmaking simulation

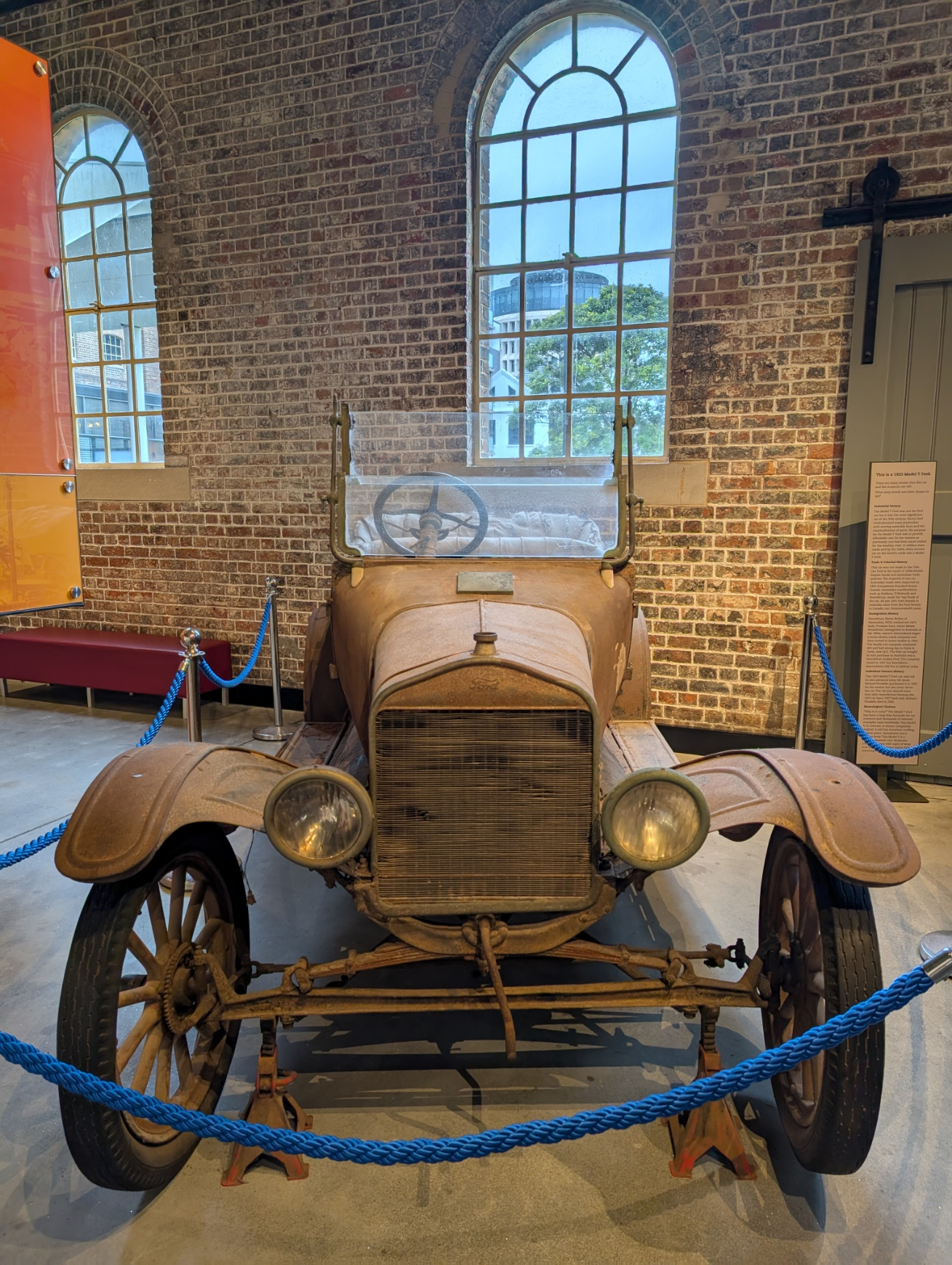
1923 Model T Ford

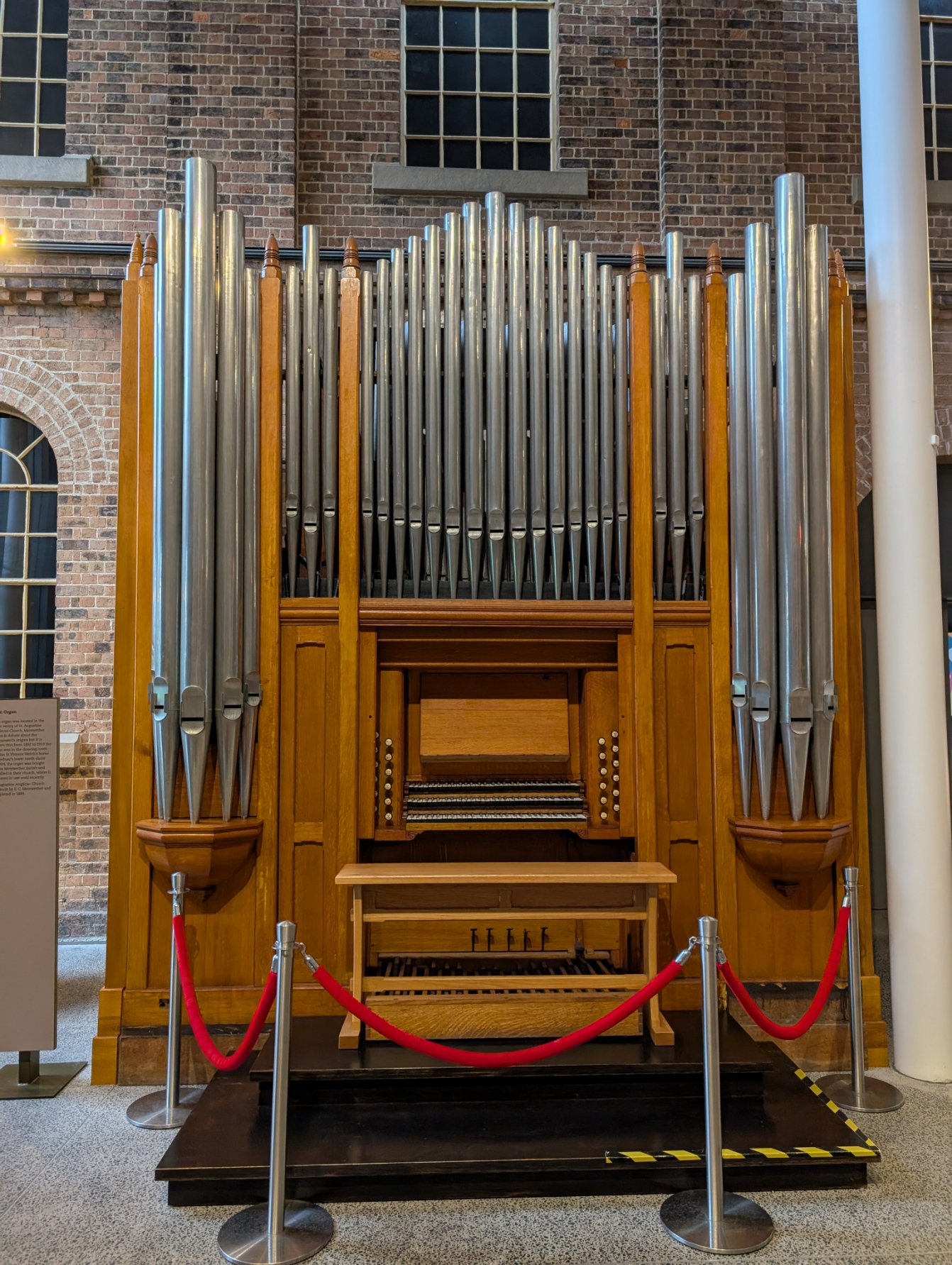
Pipe organ on display in the Link Gallery

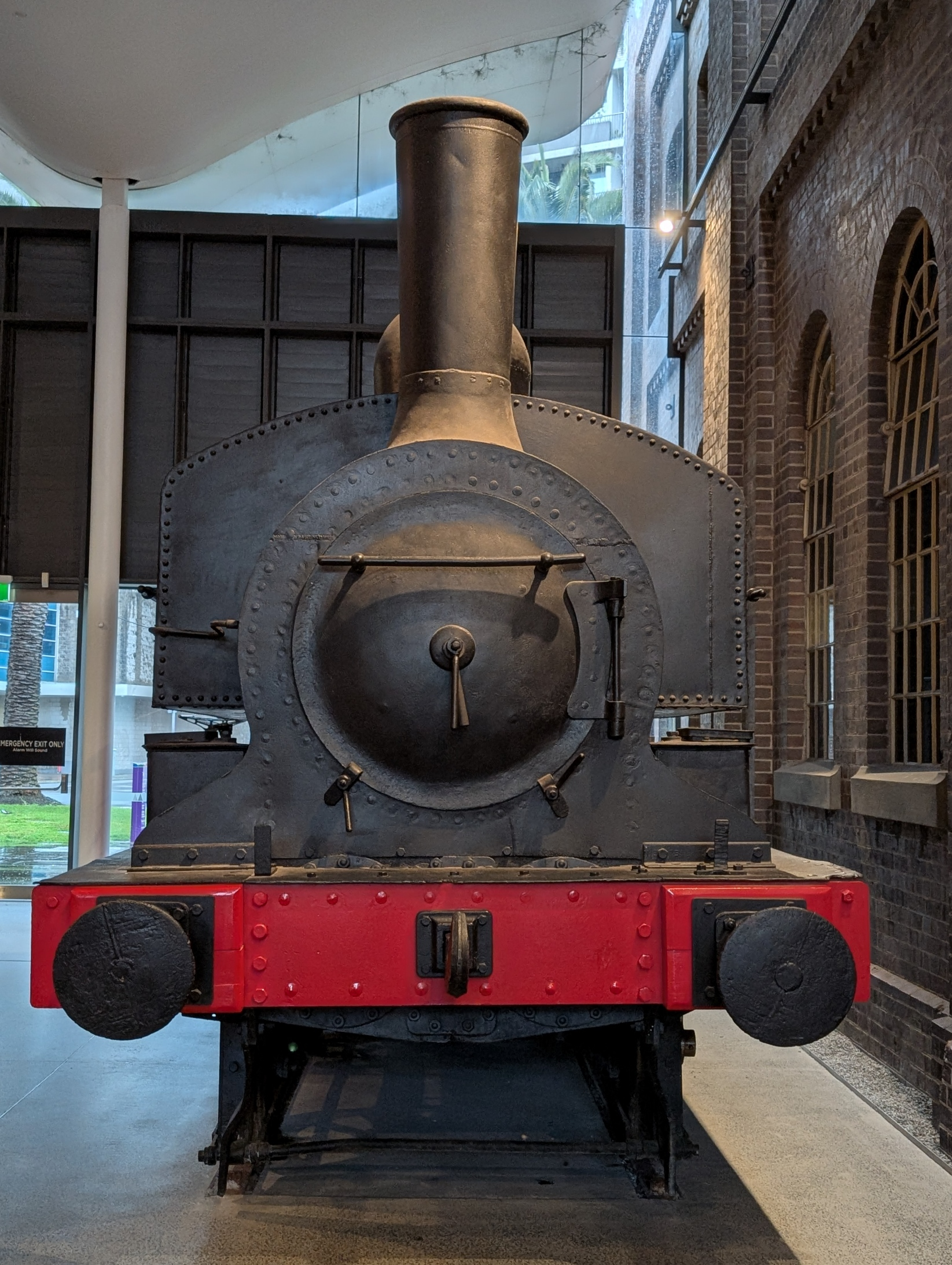
Steam Locomotive on display in the Link Gallery.

=== Special exhibitions ===
Newcastle Museum regularly hosts temporary and travelling exhibitions. Notable examples include:

- Model Newcastle (current from 27th September 2025) – An exhibition of models and miniatures that celebrate Newcastle’s history, creativity and community.
- Dinosaurs: Surviving Extinction (September 2024 – March 2025) – An exhibition outlining the evolution of dinosaurs from the Cretaceous period to modern-day birds.

== Programs and features ==
In addition to its exhibitions, Newcastle Museum offers a range of other experiences. Living Labels QR codes provide extended exhibit content via mobile devices. School holiday programs include science workshops and family-friendly activities. The museum also hosts a variety of other activities throughout the year including shows, talks, workshops and author appearances. Activities span a wide range of topics including arts, culture, science, engineering, the environment and music. Science Shows are also offered for school visits. The museum’s collection spans industrial heritage, local history, and hands-on science exhibits.

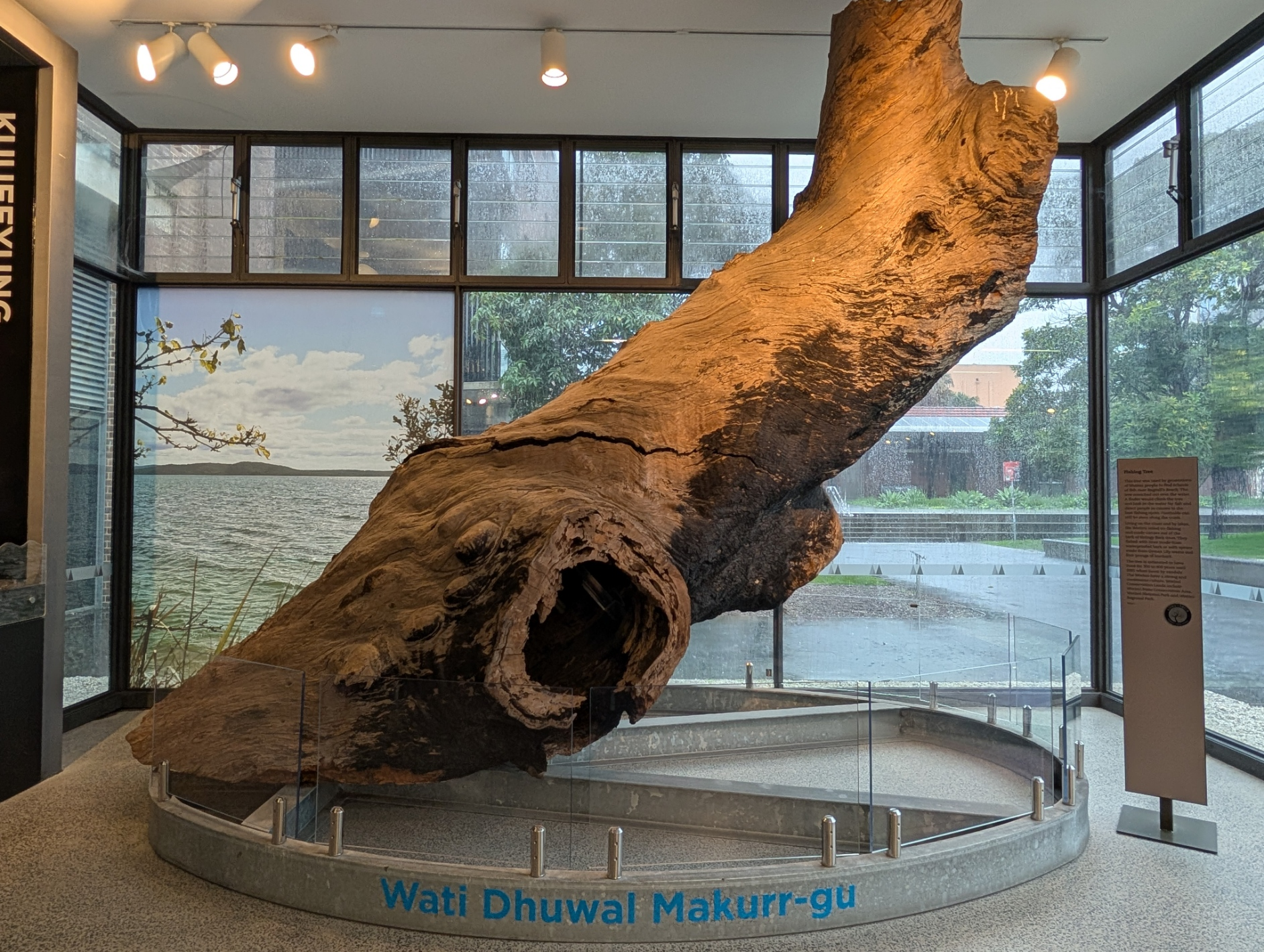
Fishing tree in the foyer of Newcastle museum: used by generations of Worimi people to find schools of fish near Bagnall's beach.

== Awards ==
- Australian Museums and Galleries Award 2021 – National MAGNA 1X4
- Australian Museums and Galleries Award 2021 – MAGNA Temporary or Travelling Exhibition Level 1: Budget less than $20 000 1X4
- Museums Australasia Multimedia and Publication Design Awards 2021 – Winner Program Website Level A 1X4
- Museums Australasia Multimedia and Publication Design Awards 2020 – Winner Poster Level A Exploding Heads
- Museums Australasia Multimedia and Publication Design Awards 2020 – Highly Commended Identity Level A Exploding Heads
- Museums Australasia Multimedia and Publication Design Awards 2015 – Shortlisted Exhibition Catalogue (Small) Earthquake then & Now
- Museums Australasia Multimedia and Publication Design Awards 2013 – Winner Multimedia Level B Toys Exhibition Animation
- Museums Australasia Multimedia and Publication Design Awards 2013 – Highly Commended Invitation Level B Carnival of Wonder: 1st Birthday
- Hunter Tourism Awards 2013 - Finalist, Cultural Heritage & Tourism.
- AusTralian Museums and Galleries Award 2012 – Winner Level 1 (Under $20 000) Sustainability Newcastle Museum Green Team
- Australian Museums and Galleries Award 2012 – Highly Commended Level 4 (More than $500 000) Newcastle Museum Permanent Redevelopment
- Hunter Tourism Awards 2012 – Winner in New Tourism Development
- UDIA Awards 2012 – Winner of Best NSW Regional & ACT Project
- UDIA Awards 2012 – Commendation Award in Urban Renewal
- Landcom Lower Hunter Urban Design Awards 2012 – Graph Building Heritage Award
- Landcom Lower Hunter Urban Design Awards 2012 – Scooters & Mobility & Australasia *Independent Living Aids Universal Access Award
- NSW Tourism Awards 2012 - Silver Medal for New Tourism Product
- Finalist, Hunter Tourism Awards 2012 - Heritage & Culture
- Master Builders Association of NSW 2011 - Winner of Adaptive Re-use of an historic building
- Melbourne Design Award 2011 - Best Photographic campaign for our Newcastle Museum themed children.

== History ==
Former logo

The Newcastle Museum was founded in 1988, and was opened by Queen Elizabeth II. It was originally located in the old Castlemaine Brewery building on Hunter Street until 2008. In 2011 it reopened in its present location, 1.7 km (1.1 mi) away in the former headquarters of the Great Northern Railway which includes the heritage-listed Honeysuckle Point Railway Workshops.

=== Stolen bones ===
In 2003, bones from a psittacosaurus sinensis, which were 110 million years old, were stolen from the museum. The bones had been on loan from China. Police asked the public for information and attempted to recover the bones with a $5000 reward offered for their return.

=== Failed knife attack ===
On 26 June 2024, a 19-year-old man attempted a knife attack on Newcastle MP Tim Crakanthorp, carrying knives and tactical gear. He was later arrested inside the Newcastle Museum and injured zero people.

== Location ==
- Opposite the building: NUspace, University of Newcastle
- Opposite the building: Civic Hub
- Opposite the light rail station: Civic station
