= Honeysuckle, Newcastle =

Suburb in New South Wales, Australia

Honeysuckle is a near completed 50 hectare residential and commercial urban renewal redevelopment of former industrial land along Newcastle Harbour in New South Wales, Australia.

== History ==
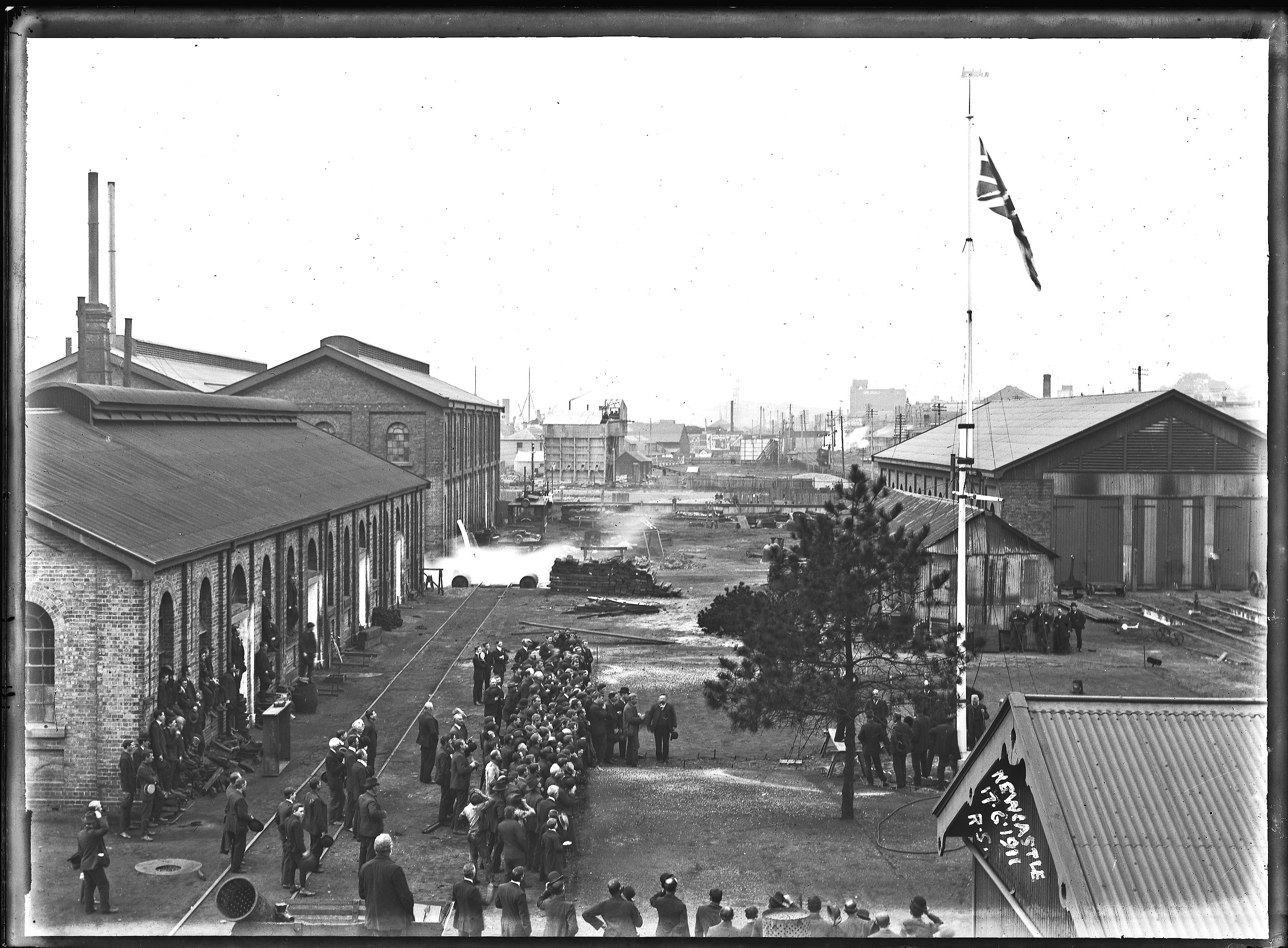
Honeysuckle work sheds in 1911

The precinct gained its name from the honeysuckle plant, Banksia integrifolia. Before the arrival of British settlers, it was an important place for the Awabakal and Worimi people, the traditional owners of the land.

Honeysuckle Point was largely unsettled during the early European settlement of Newcastle, and industrial activity was not seen in the area until the 1850s. In 1857, train maintenance facilities were established there with the advent of railway, with Newcastle being the centre of the separate northern NSW network until 1889. With the industrialization of Newcastle, for most of the 20th century, it was dominated by the Honeysuckle railway workshops, wool stores, cargo sheds and warehouses.

In 1992, the Honeysuckle Development Corporation was established by the NSW government in order to manage the urban development of the area. In 2003, it was merged with the Government's Regional Land Development Corporation to form the Hunter Development Corporation (HDC). It is currently part of the Hunter and Central Coast Development Corporation (HCCDC) since its merger with the Central Coast Development Corporation in 2016, in the framework of the Hunter Regional Plan 2036.

== Development ==
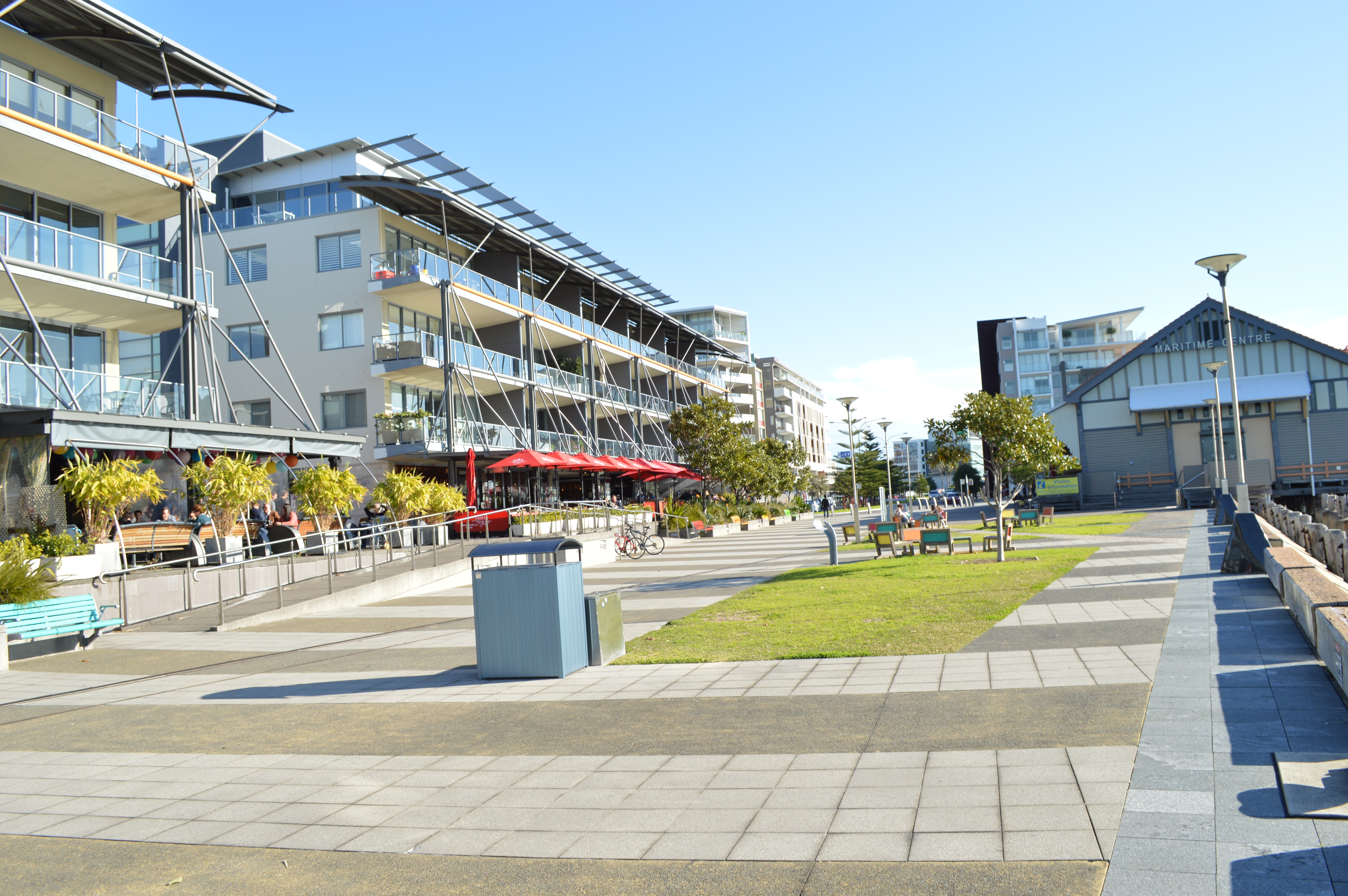
Lee Wharf, Honeysuckle

Since the 1990s, more than 50 hectares of former industrial land has been developed with private investment of $1 billion, generating an estimated $3 billion in economic activity. The overall Honeysuckle development has focused on the connection of the waterfront with Newcastle's CBD. "Honeysuckle HQ", a priority project for the HCCDC, encisages the creation of diverse mix of residential, commercial and retail outcomes; along with two hectares of harbourside land for public space including a waterfront promenade, two new parks and the naturalisation of Cottage Creek.

A number of heritage-listed buildings along Newcastle Harbour has been preserved with the project, including the former railway work sheds which now house The Forum, the Newcastle Regional Museum and space for community activities

== Criticism ==
The Honeysuckle development utilised a top-down, modernist, rational model based on similar urban renewal projects worldwide, such as New York's Battery Park City, London’s Canary Wharf, and Melbourne’s Docklands. The commonality between these developments is that they focused on physical planning around city centres where new buildings, markets, and hotels attempt to 'revitalise' the city. Studies suggest this planning approach can focus on the technical expertise at the expense of public participation in the decision making process.
